= Bobby Goldsboro discography =

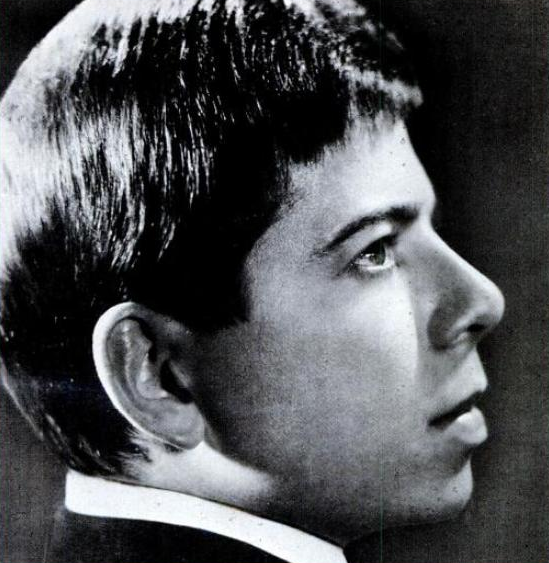
- Studio albums: 26
- Compilation albums: 31
- Singles: 61
- Related albums: 4

This is the discography for American pop and country musician Bobby Goldsboro.

== Studio albums ==
Year	Album	Chart Positions				Label
Year	Album	US Country	US	CAN	AUS	Label
1964	The Bobby Goldsboro Album	—	—	—	—	United Artists
1964	I Can't Stop Loving You	—	—	—	—	United Artists
1965	Little Things	—	—	—	—	United Artists
1965	Broomstick Cowboy	—	—	—	—	United Artists
1966	It's Too Late	—	—	—	—	United Artists
1966	Blue Autumn	—	—	—	—	United Artists
1967	Solid Goldsboro	—	165	—	—	United Artists
1967	The Romantic, Wacky, Soulful, Rockin', Country, Bobby Goldsboro	—	—	—	—	United Artists
1967	Our Way of Life (w/ Del Reeves)	28	—	—	—	United Artists
1968	Honey	1	5	41	—	United Artists
1968	Word Pictures	—	116	—	—	United Artists
1969	Today	34	60	—	—	United Artists
1970	Muddy Mississippi Line	28	139	—	—	United Artists
1970	Bobby Goldsboro's Greatest Hits	34	103	82	—	United Artists
1970	We Gotta Start Lovin/Watching Scotty Grow	20	120	–	–	United Artists
1971	Come Back Home	—	142	—	—	United Artists
1972	California Wine	—	—	—	—	United Artists
1973	Brand New Kind of Love	—	207	—	—	United Artists
1973	Summer (The First Time)	10	150	—	25	United Artists
1974	10th Anniversary Album	—	174	—	—	United Artists
1974	Hello Summertime	—	—	—	—	United Artists
1975	Through the Eyes of a Man	—	—	—	—	United Artists
1976	A Butterfly for Bucky	37	—	—	—	United Artists
1977	Goldsboro	—	—	—	—	Epic
1981	Bobby Goldsboro	54	—	—	—	Curb
1982	The Round-Up Saloon	—	—	—	—	Curb
1986	Happy Holidays	—	—	—	—	Spectra
1987	Bobby Goldsboro; Best of Bobby Goldsboro(Re-recording)	—	—	—	—	Spectra
2015	Country (Live recording in 2011)	—	—	—	—	Sony Music

== Compilation albums ==
- This is Bobby Goldsboro (1969) Sunset
- Pledge of Love (1970) Sunset
- Autumn of My Life (1971) Sunset
- I Believe in Music (1976) Sunset (Canada)
- Greatest hits of Bobby Goldsboro (1978) Sunset (UK)
- Voice of Honey Sunset (Germany)
- Bobby Goldsboro Gold (1977) K-tel (Canada/Australia) - #59 AUS
- Love Songs (1980) Suffolk
- Best of Bobby Goldsboro (1981) Liberty
- The Very Best of Bobby Goldsboro (1989) C5 (UK)
- Doral Presents Bobby Goldsboro
- United Artists Music publishing Group Presents Songs of Bobby Goldsboro (1974) United Artists
- All-Time Greatest Hits (1990) Curb
- Honey (1990) BMG
- Summer the first time (1994)U.K. Curb
- Greatest Hits (1995) EMI Special Market
- 22 Greatest Hits (1995) Remember RMB 75084
- Honey/Summer (1998) BGO
- Hello Summertime (1999) EMI
- Greatest Hits Collection (1999) Platinum Entertainment
- It's Too Late/Today (2002) BGO
- Absolutely the Best (2003) Fuel 2000
- Best of Bobby Goldsboro, Vol.1 (2004) (2008) Curb
- Best of Bobby Goldsboro, Vol, 2 (2004) (2008) Curb
- Honey (2005) CBUJ Entertainment
- Brand New Kind of Love (2005) with DVD BCI Music
- Honey/We Gotta Start Lovin' (2006) Collectables
- Very Best of Bobby Goldsboro (2007) EMI
- Greatest Hits (2010) Membran
- With pen in hand (2019) Hump Head 2CD set
- Very best of Bobby Goldsboro (2020) Not Now Music 2CD set

== Related albums ==
- Gator Original Motion Picture Soundtrack album included "For a Little While", composed and performed by Bobby Goldsboro (1976) UA
- Children of the World included "Kids are People, Too" by Bobby Goldsboro (1980) Cleveland International
- The In Crowd included rare recordings, including "Why Must I Be" by Bobby Goldsboro, Design Records
- Fred Carter, Jr. plays Bobby Goldsboro (1964) was produced by Bobby Goldsboro, United Artists

== Singles ==
Year	Single (A-side, B-side) Both sides from same album except where indicated	Chart Positions									Album
Year	Single (A-side, B-side) Both sides from same album except where indicated	US Country	US	US Cashbox	US AC	CAN Country	CAN CHUM RPM	CAN AC	UK	IRE	Album
1962	"You Better Go Home" b/w "Lonely Traveler"	–	–	–	–	–	–	–	–	–	Non-album tracks
1962	"Molly" b/w "Honey Baby"	–	70	60	17	–	–	–	–	–	Non-album tracks
1963	"The Runaround" b/w"The Letter"	–	–	–	–	–	–	–	–	–	Non-album tracks
1963	"That's What Love Will Do" b/w "Light the Candles (Throw the Rice)"	–	–	–	–	–	–	–	–	–	Non-album tracks
1963	"See the Funny Little Clown" ^{1} b/w "Hello Loser"	–	9	10	3	–	30	–	–	–	The Bobby Goldsboro Album
1964	"Whenever He Holds You" b/w "If She Was Mine" (from Little Things)	–	39	41	13	–	28	–	–	–	The Bobby Goldsboro Album
1964	"Me Japanese Boy I Love You" b/w "Everyone But Me" (from I Can't Stop Loving You)	–	74	83	14	–	39	–	–	–	Little Things
1964	"I Don't Know You Anymore" b/w "Little Drops of Water"	–	105	136	–	–	–	–	–	–	Little Things
1964	"Little Things" ^{1} b/w "I Can't Go On Pretending" (from I Can't Stop Loving You)	–	13	12	–	–	4	4	–	–	Little Things
1965	"Voodoo Woman" b/w "It Breaks My Heart"	–	27	27	–	–	6	–	–	–	Broomstick Cowboy
1965	"If You Wait for Love" /	–	75	97	–	–	–	–	–	–	Broomstick Cowboy
1965	"If You've Got a Heart"	–	60	58	–	–	–	–	–	–	Broomstick Cowboy
1965	"Broomstick Cowboy" b/w "Ain't Got Time for Happy"	–	53	52	–	–	20	–	–	–	Broomstick Cowboy
1966	"It's Too Late" ^{1} b/w "I'm Goin' Home" (from Broomstick Cowboy)	–	23	28	–	–	5	–	–	–	It's Too Late
1966	"I Know You Better Than That" b/w "When Your Love Has Gone" (from It's Too Late)	–	56	77	–	–	–	23	–	–	Blue Autumn
1966	"Take Your Love" b/w "Longer Than Forever"	–	114	123	–	–	–	–	–	–	Blue Autumn
1966	"It Hurts Me" b/w "Pity the Fool" (from Little Things)	–	70	100	–	–	–	86	–	–	Blue Autumn
1966	"Blue Autumn" b/w "I Just Don't Love You Anymore" (from It's Too Late)	–	35	37	–	–	20	–	–	–	Blue Autumn
1967	"Goodbye to All You Women" /	–	102	103	–	–	–	–	–	–	Pledge of Love
1967	"Love Is"	–	–	122	–	–	–	–	–	–	Pledge of Love
1967	"Trusty Little Herbert" b/w "Three in the Morning" (from Autumn of My Life)	–	–	–	–	–	–	–	–	–	This Is Bobby Goldsboro
1967	"Jo Jo's Place" /	–	111	–	–	–	–	–	–	–	Non-album track
1967	"Pledge of Love"	–	118	109	–	–	–	–	–	–	Blue Autumn
1968	"I Just Wasted the Rest" b/w "Our Way of Life"; Both sides: Del Reeves & Bobby Goldsboro	56	–	–	–	–	–	–	–	–	Our Way of Life
1968	"Honey" ^{1} b/w "Danny" (from Word Pictures)	1	1	1	1	1	1	–	2	1	Honey
1968	"Autumn of My Life" b/w "She Chased Me" (from Blue Autumn)	15	19	14	2	2	11	–	–	–	Word Pictures
1968	"The Straight Life" b/w "Tomorrow Is Forgotten" (from Today)	37	36	29	6	7	19	–	–	–	Word Pictures
1968	"Look Around You (It's Christmas Time)" b/w "A Christmas Wish" (Non-album track)	–	–	–	–	–	–	–	–	–	Word Pictures
1969	"Glad She's a Woman" b/w "Letter to Emily" (from Word Pictures)	49	61	45	7	–	44	–	–	–	Today
1969	"I'm a Drifter" b/w "Hoboes and Kings"	22	46	44	14	–	36	9	–	–	Today
1969	"Muddy Mississippi Line" b/w "Richer Man Than I" (from Today)	15	53	46	10	1	37	16	–	–	Muddy Mississippi Line
1969	"Take a Little Good Will Home" b/w "She Thinks I Still Care"; Both sides: Bobby Goldsboro & Del Reeves	31	–	–	–	31	–	–	–	–	Our Way of Life
1970	"Mornin' Mornin'" b/w "Requiem" (from We Gotta Start Lovin')	56	78	78	23	–	64	18	–	–	Muddy Mississippi Line
1970	"Can You Feel It" b/w "Time Good, Time Bad" (from Muddy Mississippi Line)	71	75	98	8	–	–	–	–	–	Bobby Goldsboro's Greatest Hits
1970	"It's Gonna Change" b/w "Down on the Bayou"	–	108	–	38	–	–	–	–	–	We Gotta Start Lovin'
1970	"My God and I" b/w "World Beyond"	–	–	116	–	–	–	–	–	–	We Gotta Start Lovin'
1970	"Watching Scotty Grow" ^{1} b/w "Water Color Days"	7	11	8	1	7	5; 93	1	–	–	We Gotta Start Lovin'
1971	"And I Love You So" b/w "The Gentle of a Man"	48	83	91	8	–	93	7	–	–	Come Back Home
1971	"Come Back Home" b/w "I'll Remember You"	–	69	74	15	–	89	17	–	–	Come Back Home
1971	"Danny Is a Mirror to Me" /	–	107	119	34	–	–	–	–	–	Come Back Home
1971	"A Poem for My Little Lady"	–	–	130	27	–	–	–	–	–	Come Back Home
1972	"California Wine" b/w "To Be With You"	–	108	113	36	–	–	–	–	–	California Wine
1972	"With Pen in Hand" b/w "Southern Fried Singin' Sunday Morning" (from California Wine)	–	94	87	28	–	–	–	–	–	Bobby Goldsboro's Greatest Hits
1973	"Brand New Kind of Love" b/w "Country Feelin's" (from California Wine)	–	116	104	37	–	–	40	–	–	Brand New Kind of Love
1973	"Summer (The First Time)" b/w "Childhood-1949" (from Brand New Kind of Love)	100	21	17	18	–	29	15	9	16	Summer (The First Time)
1973	"Marlena" b/w "Sing Me a Smile"	52	–	101	–	76	–	70	–	–	Summer (The First Time)
1974	"I Believe the South Is Gonna Rise Again" (w/ The TSU Chorus) b/w "She" (from Summer (The First Time))	62	–	–	–	–	–	–	–	–	Through the Eyes of a Man
1974	"Quicksand" b/w "And Then There Was Gina"	–	–	–	–	–	–	–	–	–	Through the Eyes of a Man
1974	"Hello Summertime" /	79	–	112	8	–	–	46	14	18	Hello Summertime
1975	"And Then There Was Gina"	–	–	–	15	–	–	15	–	–	Through the Eyes of a Man
1975	"I Wrote a Song (Sing Along)" b/w "You Pull Me Down" (from Through the Eyes of a Man)	–	–	–	16	–	–	17	–	–	A Butterfly for Bucky
1976	"A Butterfly for Bucky" b/w "Another Night Alone"	22	101	102	7	7	–	12	–	–	A Butterfly for Bucky
1976	"Reunion" b/w "She Taught Me How to Live Again"	–	–	–	–	–	–	–	–	–	A Butterfly for Bucky
1977	"Me and the Elephants" b/w "I Love Music"	82	104	–	6	–	–	10	–	–	Goldsboro
1977	"The Cowboy and the Lady" b/w "Me and Millie"	85	–	–	–	–	–	–	–	–	Goldsboro
1979	"He'll Have to Go" b/w "Too Hot to Handle" (Non-album track)	–	–	–	–	–	–	–	–	–	Goldsboro
1979	"Black Fool's Gold" b/w "Life Gets Hard on Easy Street"	–	–	–	–	–	–	–	–	–	Goldsboro
1980	"Goodbye Marie" b/w "Love Has Made a Woman Out of You"	17	–	–	19	–	–	–	–	–	Bobby Goldsboro
1981	"Alice Doesn't Love Here Anymore" b/w "Green Eyed Woman, Nashville, Blues"	20	–	–	34	41	–	–	–	–	Bobby Goldsboro
1981	"Love Ain't Never Hurt Nobody" b/w "Wings of an Eagle"	19	–	–	–	33	–	–	–	–	Bobby Goldsboro
1981	"The Round-Up Saloon" b/w "Green Eyed Woman, Nashville, Blues" (from Bobby Goldsboro)	31	–	–	–	38	–	–	–	–	The Round-Up Saloon
1982	"Lucy and the Stranger" b/w "Out Run the Sun"	49	–	–	–	–	–	–	–	–	The Round-Up Saloon

Key: ^{1} Indicates titles that were awarded gold disc status.

== Video releases ==
- Best of Bobby Goldsboro(1987) On Video & DVD
- Country Legends (2005) CD+DVD
