= 11th Annual Grammy Awards =

1969 US music awards ceremony

- Date: March 12, 1969
- Location: Chicago, Los Angeles, Nashville & New York

Television/radio coverage
- Network: NBC

The 11th Annual Grammy Awards were held on March 12, 1969. They recognized accomplishments of musicians for the year 1968.

== Presenters ==
- Dan Rowan & Dick Martin - Introduced The Temptations
- Flip Wilson - Introduced Jeannie C. Riley
- The King Family - Best New Artist & Best Contemporary Male Vocal Performance and introduced Jose Feliciano
- Lou Rawls & Bobbie Gentry - Introduced Glen Campbell
- Burt Bacharach - Introduced Dionne Warwick
- Mama Cass Elliott - Introduced The Beatles
- Nancy Sinatra - Introduced Mason Williams
- Davy Jones - Introduced Bobby Goldsboro
- Don Rickles & Tiny Tim - Introduced Simon & Garfunkel
- Tommy Smothers - Introduced the cast of Hair
- Henry Mancini - Record of the Year

== Performers ==
- The Temptations - "Cloud Nine"
- Jeannie C. Riley - "Harper Valley PTA"
- Jose Feliciano - "Light My Fire"
- Glen Campbell - "Wichita Lineman"
- Dionne Warwick - "Do You Know the Way to San Jose"
- The Beatles - "Hey Jude"
- Mason Williams - "Classical Gas"
- Bobby Goldsboro - "Honey"
- Simon & Garfunkel - "Mrs. Robinson"
- O.C. Smith - "Little Green Apples"
- The Cast of Hair - "Age of Aquarius/Let the Sunshine In"

== Award winners ==
Record of the Year

- "Mrs. Robinson" — Simon & Garfunkel
  - Paul Simon & Roy Halee, producers
- “Wichita Lineman” — Glen Campbell
  - Al De Lory, producer
- “Honey” — Bobby Goldsboro
  - Bobby Goldsboro & Bob Montgomery, producers
- “Hey Jude” — The Beatles
  - George Martin, producer
- “Harper Valley PTA” — Jeannie C. Riley
  - Shelby S. Singleton Jr., producer

Album of the Year

- “By the Time I Get to Phoenix” — Glen Campbell
  - Al De Lory, producer
- “Magical Mystery Tour” — The Beatles
  - George Martin, producer
- “Feliciano!” — José Feliciano
  - Rick Jarrard, producer
- “Bookends” — Simon And Garfunkel
  - Roy Halee & Simon And Garfunkel (Art Garfunkel & Paul Simon), producers
- “A Tramp Shining” — Richard Harris
  - Jimmy L. Webb, producer

Song of the Year

- "Little Green Apples" — Roger Miller / O.C. Smith
  - Bobby Russell, songwriter
- “Mrs. Robinson” — Simon And Garfunkel
  - Paul Simon, songwriter
- “Honey” — Bobby Goldsboro
  - Bobby Russell, songwriter
- “Hey Jude” — The Beatles
  - John Lennon & Paul McCartney, songwriters
- “Harper Valley PTA” — Jeannie C. Riley
  - Tom T. Hall, songwriter

Best New Artist

- José Feliciano
- Cream
- O.C. Smith
- Jeannie C. Riley
- Gary Puckett And The Union Gap

=== Classical ===
- Best Classical Performance - Orchestra
  - Pierre Boulez (conductor) & the New Philharmonia Orchestra for Boulez Conducts Debussy (La Mer; Prelude A L'Apres-Midi D'Un Faune; Jeux)
- Best Vocal Soloist Performance
  - Carlo Felice Cillario (conductor), Montserrat Caballé & the RCA Italiana Opera Orchestra & Chorus for Rossini: Rarities
- Best Opera Recording
  - Richard Mohr (producer), Erich Leinsdorf (conductor), Ezio Flagello, Sherrill Milnes, Leontyne Price, Judith Raskin, George Shirley, Tatiana Troyanos & the New Philharmonia Orchestra for Mozart: Cosi Fan Tutte
- Best Choral Performance (other than opera)
  - Vittorio Negri (conductor), George Bragg, Gregg Smith, (choir directors), E. Power Biggs, the Edward Tarr Ensemble, the Gregg Smith Singers & the Texas Boys Choir for The Glory of Gabrieli
- Best Performance - Instrumental Soloist or Soloists (with or without orchestra)
  - Vladimir Horowitz for Horowitz on Television (Chopin, Scriabin, Scarlatti, Horowitz)
- Best Chamber Music Performance
  - Vittorio Negri (conductor), E. Power Biggs & the Edward Tarr Ensemble for Glory of Gabrieli Vol. II - Canzonas for Brass, Winds, Strings and Organ

=== Comedy ===
- Best Comedy Performance
  - Bill Cosby for To Russell, My Brother, Whom I Slept With

=== Composing and arranging ===
- Best Instrumental Theme
  - Mason Williams (composer) for "Classical Gas"
- Best Original Score Written for a Motion Picture or a Television Special
  - Dave Grusin & Paul Simon (composers) for The Graduate performed by Simon & Garfunkel
- Best Instrumental Arrangement
  - Mike Post (arranger) for "Classical Gas" performed by Mason Williams
- Best Arrangement Accompanying Vocalist(s)
  - Jimmy L. Webb (arranger) for "MacArthur Park" performed by Richard Harris

=== Country ===
- Best Country Vocal Performance, Female
  - Jeannie C. Riley for "Harper Valley PTA"
- Best Country Vocal Performance, Male
  - Johnny Cash for "Folsom Prison Blues"
- Best Country Performance, Duo or Group - Vocal or Instrumental
  - Flatt & Scruggs for "Foggy Mountain Breakdown"
- Best Country Song
  - Bobby Russell (songwriter) for "Little Green Apples" performed by Roger Miller / O.C. Smith

=== Folk ===
- Best Folk Performance
  - Judy Collins for "Both Sides Now"

=== Gospel ===
- Best Gospel Performance
  - The Happy Goodman Family for The HAPPY GOSPEL of the Happy Goodmans album
- Best Soul Gospel Performance
  - Dottie Rambo for "The Soul of Me" from the album It's The Soul Of Me (Dottie Rambo Sings Spirituals)
- Best Sacred Performance
  - Jake Hess for "Beautiful Isle of Somewhere" from the album Beautiful Isle of Somewhere

=== Jazz ===
- Best Instrumental Jazz Performance - Small Group or Soloist with Small Group
  - Bill Evans for Bill Evans at the Montreux Jazz Festival performed by the Bill Evans Trio
- Best Instrumental Jazz Performance - Large Group or Soloist with Large Group
  - Duke Ellington for "And His Mother Called Him Bill"

=== Musical show ===
- Best Score From an Original Cast Show Album
  - Galt MacDermot, Gerome Ragni, James Rado (composers), Andy Wiswell (producer) the original cast (Ronnie Dyson, Gerome Ragni, Steve Curry, Lamont Washington, Diane Keaton, Melba Moore & James Rado) for Hair

=== Packaging and notes ===
- Best Album Cover
  - John Berg, Richard Mantell (art directors), Horn Grinner Studios (photographer) for Underground performed by Thelonious Monk
- Best Album Notes
  - Johnny Cash (notes writer) for Johnny Cash at Folsom Prison performed by Johnny Cash

=== Pop ===
- Best Contemporary-Pop Vocal Performance, Female
  - Dionne Warwick for "Do You Know the Way to San Jose?"
- Best Contemporary-Pop Vocal Performance, Male
  - Jose Feliciano for "Light My Fire"
- Best Contemporary-Pop Performance - Vocal Duo or Group
  - Simon & Garfunkel for "Mrs. Robinson"
- Best Contemporary Pop Performance, Chorus
  - Alan Copeland (choir director) for "Mission Impossible/Norwegian Wood Medley" performed by the Alan Copeland Singers
- Best Pop Instrumental Performance
  - Mason Williams for "Classical Gas"

=== Production and engineering ===
- Best Engineered Recording, Non-Classical
  - Hugh Davies & Joe Polito (engineers) for "Wichita Lineman" performed by Glen Campbell
- Best Engineered Recording, Classical
  - Gordon Parry (engineer), Georg Solti (conductor) & the London Symphony Orchestra for Mahler: Symphony No. 9 in D

=== R&B ===
- Best R&B Performance, Female
  - Aretha Franklin for "Chain of Fools"
- Best R&B Vocal Performance, Male
  - Otis Redding for "(Sittin' On) The Dock of the Bay" (posthumously)
- Best Rhythm & Blues Performance by a Duo or Group, Vocal or Instrumental
  - The Temptations for "Cloud Nine"
- Best Rhythm & Blues Song
  - Otis Redding & Steve Cropper (songwriters) for "(Sittin' On) The Dock of the Bay" performed by Otis Redding

=== Spoken ===
- Best Spoken Word Recording
  - Rod McKuen for Lonesome Cities
