= Bobby (When People Were Shorter and Lived Near the Water album) =

Studio album by When People Were Shorter and Lived Near the Water
- Released: 1989
- Recorded: Noise New York (New York City, NY)
- Genre: Psychedelic pop
- Length: 54:29
- Label: Shimmy Disc
- Producer: Kramer

When People Were Shorter and Lived Near the Water chronology
| Bobby (1989) | Porgy (1991) |

Professional ratings
Review scores
| Source | Rating |
|---|---|
| AllMusic | 3/5 stars |

Bobby is the debut studio album by When People Were Shorter and Lived Near the Water. It was released in 1989 by Shimmy Disc. It was re-issued on CD with six additional songs.

== Track listing ==
All tracks are written by Bobby Goldsboro, except where noted.

Side one
| No. | Title | Writer(s) | Length |
|---|---|---|---|
| 1. | "Muddy Mississippi Line" | | 3:41 |
| 2. | "Broomstick Cowboy" | | 2:35 |
| 3. | "Watching Scotty Grow" | Mac Davis | 3:10 |
| 4. | "The Straight Life" | Sonny Curtis | 1:52 |
| 5. | "If You've Got a Heart" | | 2:34 |
| 6. | "See the Funny Little Clown" | | 3:31 |
| 7. | "Can You Feel It?" | | 3:32 |

Side two
| No. | Title | Writer(s) | Length |
|---|---|---|---|
| 1. | "Honey" | Bobby Russell | 2:21 |
| 2. | "Little Things" | | 1:39 |
| 3. | "Autumn of My Life" | | 3:18 |
| 4. | "Voodoo Woman" | | 1:53 |
| 5. | "With Pen Hand" | | 4:40 |
| 6. | "It's Too Late" | | 2:18 |
| 7. | "Me, Japanese Boy" | Burt Bacharach, Hal David | 2:14 |
| 8. | "I'm a Drifter" | | 3:12 |

CD issue bonus tracks
| No. | Title | Writer(s) | Length |
|---|---|---|---|
| 16. | "This Guy's in Love with You" | Burt Bacharach, Hal David | 2:19 |
| 17. | "Dominique" | Jeanine Deckers | 3:10 |
| 18. | "A Girl Named Sandoz" | Eric Burdon, Vic Briggs, John Weider, Barry Jenkins, Danny McCulloch | 3:35 |
| 19. | "Timothy" | Rupert Holmes | 2:57 |
| 20. | "Glad She's a Woman" | | 2:35 |
| 21. | "Watercolor Days" | | 1:54 |

== Personnel ==
Adapted from Bobby liner notes.

When People Were Shorter and Lived Near the Water

- Kim Rancourt – vocals
- Paul Defilipps – vocals, trombone
- David Raymer – guitars, piano, vocals
- Robert Meetsma – guitar, lap steel guitar, cornet, vocals
- Dave Rick – bass, vocals
- David Licht – drums

Additional musicians

- Nick Collins – trombone
- Frank London – trumpet
- Robert Poss – guitar
- Jeff Schoen – organ
- Steve Shelley – percussion
- Kramer – bass, slide guitar
- Ron Spitzer – guitar
- Chris Xefos – tuba, accordion

Production and additional personnel

- Tom Cinoman – photography
- Kramer – production, bass guitar, slide guitar
- Sue Fisher – engineering

== Release history ==
| Region | Date | Label | Format | Catalog |
|---|---|---|---|---|
| United States | 1989 | Shimmy Disc | CS, LP | shimmy 024 |
| Europe | 1989 | Shimmy Disc | CD, LP | SDE 8913 |
