= Little Green Apples =

1968 song

Single by Roger Miller

from the album A Tender Look at Love
- B-side: "Our Little Love"
- Released: February 1968
- Recorded: 1967
- Genre: Country
- Length: 2:36
- Label: Smash
- Songwriter: Bobby Russell
- Producer: Jerry Kennedy

Roger Miller singles chronology
"Old Toy Trains" (1967)	"Little Green Apples" (1968)	"Tolivar" (1968)

"Little Green Apples"

Single by O. C. Smith

from the album Hickory Holler Revisited
- B-side: "Long Black Limousine" (non-UK); "Gas, Food, Lodging" (UK)
- Released: September 1968
- Recorded: 1968 at Columbia Recording Studios, Hollywood
- Genre: R&B, soul
- Length: 3:58
- Label: Columbia
- Songwriter: Bobby Russell
- Producer: Jerry Fuller

O. C. Smith singles chronology
"Main Street Mission" (1968)	"Little Green Apples" (1968)	"Isn't It Lonely Together?" (1968)

"Little Green Apples" is a song written by Bobby Russell that became a hit for three different artists, with their three separate releases, in 1968. Originally written for and released by American recording artist Roger Miller, "Little Green Apples" was also released as a single by American recording artists Patti Page and O. C. Smith that same year. Smith's version became a #2 hit on both the Billboard Hot 100 and Billboard Hot Rhythm & Blues Singles charts, while Miller's version became a Top 40 hit on the Hot 100 as well as the UK Singles Chart (and a #6 hit on the Billboard Country chart). Page's version became her last Hot 100 entry. The song earned Russell a Grammy Award for Song of the Year and for Best Country Song. In 2013, "Little Green Apples" was covered by English recording artist Robbie Williams featuring American recording artist Kelly Clarkson, which became a top 40 hit in Mexico. A 2025 recording by Jamaican reggae singer George Nooks reached #7 in Jamaica.

== Overview ==
According to Buzz Cason, who partnered Bobby Russell in the Nashville-based Rising Sons music publishing firm, Russell wrote both the songs "Honey" (a #1 hit for Bobby Goldsboro in 1968) and "Little Green Apples" as "an experiment in composing", anticipating a potential market for true-to-life story songs...with more 'meat' in the lyrics [than was] standard" for current hits. Russell wrote "Little Green Apples" for Roger Miller to record and Miller made the first recording of the song on January 24, 1968, in a session produced by Jerry Kennedy at Columbia Recording Studio Nashville. Released as the lead single from the album A Tender Look at Love, "Little Green Apples" afforded Miller his final Top Ten C&W hit at #6 and also his final Top 40 crossover reaching #39 on the Hot 100 in Billboard. In the UK, Miller's "Little Green Apples" reached #19 in the spring of 1968 – when it also reached #46 in Australia – and in the spring of 1969 the track returned to the UK chart reaching #39.

Patti Page recorded "Little Green Apples" for her C&W-oriented album Gentle on My Mind whose title cut shared the Easy Listening Top Ten with Roger Miller's "Little Green Apples". Page's version of the latter was released as a single in June 1968, reaching #12 Easy Listening and affording Page the final Hot 100 appearance of her career at #96.

O. C. Smith had recorded "Little Green Apples" at Columbia Studios LA for Hickory Holler Revisited, the parent album of his Top 40 hit "Son of Hickory Holler's Tramp". The track "Main Street Mission" was originally issued as the follow-up single, but as Buzz Cason recalls "a disc jockey in Detroit played the album cut [by O. C. Smith] of 'Little Green Apples' one morning". That single spin triggered "such a reaction and rash of phone requests [as to] prompt [the deejay] to call Steve Popovich, head of promotion for Columbia in New York [City]", and "Little Green Apples" replaced "Main Street Mission" as Smith's then current single. Smith's version was a #2 hit on the Hot 100, behind "Hey Jude" by the Beatles, and likewise peaked at #2 on the R&B chart in Billboard and was certified Gold for domestic sales of one million units. The song won its composer Bobby Russell the 1969 Grammy Award for Song of the Year and the Grammy Award for Best Country Song.

== Chart positions ==
=== Weekly charts ===
Roger Miller version

Chart (1968–69)	Peak position
Australia (Kent Music Report)	46
UK Singles (Official Charts)	19
US Billboard Hot 100	39
US Adult Contemporary (Billboard)	5
US Hot Country Songs (Billboard)	6

Patti Page version

Chart (1968)	Peak position
US Billboard Hot 100	96
US Adult Contemporary (Billboard)	12

O. C. Smith version

Chart (1968)	Peak position
Australia (Kent Music Report)	35
US Billboard Hot 100	2
US Adult Contemporary (Billboard)	4
US Hot R&B/Hip-Hop Songs (Billboard)	2

Robbie Williams featuring Kelly Clarkson version

Chart (2013–14)	Peak position
Mexico Inglés Airplay (Billboard)	25

George Nooks version

Chart (2025)	Peak position
Jamaica Airplay (JAMMS)	7

=== Year-end charts ===
O.C. Smith version

Chart (1968)	Rank
US Billboard Hot 100	12

== Other notable versions ==
The song has been covered by the following artists and groups:

- Bobby Goldsboro on his 1968 album Honey
- Burl Ives on his 1968 album The Times They Are A-Changin'
- Johnny Mathis on his 1968 album Those Were the Days
- Ray Price on his 1968 album She Wears My Ring
- Frank Sinatra on his 1968 album Cycles
- Stanley Turrentine on his 1968 album Always Something There
- Dionne Warwick on her 1968 album Promises, Promises
- Tony Joe White on his 1968 album Black and White
- Glen Campbell and Bobbie Gentry on their 1968 album Bobbie Gentry & Glen Campbell
- Saxophonist Monk Higgins on his 1969 album Extra Soul Perception
- Saxophonist Sonny Stitt on his 1969 album Little Green Apples
- Tom Jones on his 1969 album This is Tom Jones
- The Temptations on their 1969 album Puzzle People
- Andy Williams on his 1969 album Happy Heart
- Bing Crosby on his 1969 album Hey Jude / Hey Bing! and also on his 1972 album Bing 'n' Basie.
- Dean Martin on his 1969 album I Take a Lot of Pride in What I Am
- The Four Tops on their 1969 album Four Tops Now!
- Tony Bennett on his 1970 album Tony Sings the Great Hits of Today!
- Ben E. King on his 1970 album Rough Edges
- Bloodstone on their 1972 self-titled album
- Vicki Lawrence on her 1973 album The Night the Lights Went Out in Georgia
- Monica Zetterlund in 1969 as Gröna små äpplen, with Swedish lyrics written by ABBA's manager Stig Anderson. Both the performance and the lyrics won Swedish Grammy awards.
- Nancy Wilson on her 2004 album R.S.V.P. (Rare Songs, Very Personal)
- Robbie Williams featuring Kelly Clarkson on his 2013 album Swings Both Ways.
