= Billboard Top Soft Rock Hits =

Compilation album series

Billboard Top Soft Rock Hits is a series of compilation albums released by Rhino Records in 1997, each featuring ten soft rock hit recordings from a specific year in the 1970s. Five albums in the series were released, one each for the years from 1970 to 1974. All 50 tracks reached the top ten of the Billboard Easy Listening chart and were top 40 hits on the Billboard Hot 100 pop singles chart.

In addition to the individual availability of each volume, the series was also issued in box set.

The series follows chronologically from the previous Rhino series of easy listening pop hits from the 1960s called Billboard Top Pop Hits.

== 1970 ==
Billboard Top Soft Rock Hits: 1970

Compilation album by Various artists
- Released: April 15, 1997
- Recorded: 1970
- Genre: Soft rock
- Length: 29:39
- Label: Rhino

Professional ratings
Review scores
Source	Rating
Allmusic	link

1. "It's Only Make Believe" — Glen Campbell (2:27)
2. "My Marie" — Engelbert Humperdinck (3:08)
3. "It Don't Matter to Me" — Bread (2:51)
4. "I'll Never Fall in Love Again" — Dionne Warwick (3:04)
5. "Without Love (There Is Nothing)" — Tom Jones (3:46)
6. "I Just Can't Help Believin'" — B.J. Thomas (2:58)
7. "One Day of Your Life" — Andy Williams (2:27)
8. "For the Love of Him" — Bobbi Martin (2:38)
9. "It's Impossible" — Perry Como (3:17)
10. "Airport Love Theme (Gwen and Vern)" — Vincent Bell (3:03)

== 1971 ==
Billboard Top Soft Rock Hits: 1971

Compilation album by Various artists
- Released: April 15, 1997
- Recorded: 1971
- Genre: Soft rock
- Label: Rhino

Professional ratings
Review scores
Source	Rating
Allmusic	link

1. "I Am...I Said" — Neil Diamond
2. "She's a Lady" — Tom Jones
3. "If" — Bread
4. "Me and You and a Dog Named Boo" — Lobo
5. "Dream Baby (How Long Must I Dream)" — Glen Campbell
6. "Put Your Hand in the Hand" — Ocean
7. "The Green Grass Starts to Grow" — Dionne Warwick
8. "Watching Scotty Grow" — Bobby Goldsboro
9. "When There's No You" — Engelbert Humperdinck
10. "Ain't No Sunshine" — Bill Withers (2:07)

== 1972 ==
Billboard Top Soft Rock Hits: 1972

Compilation album by Various artists
- Released: April 15, 1997
- Recorded: 1972
- Genre: Soft rock
- Label: Rhino

Professional ratings
Review scores
Source	Rating
Allmusic	link

1. "Morning Has Broken" — Cat Stevens
2. "The Guitar Man" — Bread
3. "Song Sung Blue" — Neil Diamond (replaced with "Clair" by Gilbert O'Sullivan on the 2000 re-issue.)
4. "Anticipation" — Carly Simon (3:20)
5. "Without You" — Nilsson (3:20)
6. "I'd Love You to Want Me" — Lobo
7. "Ben" — Michael Jackson
8. "City of New Orleans" — Arlo Guthrie (4:28)
9. "An Old Fashioned Love Song" — Three Dog Night
10. "Good Time Charlie's Got the Blues" — Danny O'Keefe

== 1973 ==
Billboard Top Soft Rock Hits: 1973

Compilation album by Various artists
- Released: April 15, 1997
- Recorded: 1973
- Genre: Soft rock
- Length: 37:23
- Label: Rhino

Professional ratings
Review scores
Source	Rating
Allmusic	link

1. "You're So Vain" — Carly Simon (4:20)
2. "The Most Beautiful Girl" — Charlie Rich (2:45)
3. "We May Never Pass This Way (Again)" — Seals & Crofts (4:16)
4. "My Maria" — B.W. Stevenson (2:32)
5. "Shambala" — Three Dog Night (3:26)
6. "Time in a Bottle" — Jim Croce (2:28)
7. "Don't Expect Me to Be Your Friend" — Lobo (3:33)
8. "And I Love You So" — Perry Como (3:20)
9. "Leave Me Alone (Ruby Red Dress)" — Helen Reddy (3:25)
10. "Dueling Banjos" — Eric Weissberg and Steve Mandell (2:18)

== 1974 ==
Billboard Top Soft Rock Hits: 1974

Compilation album by Various artists
- Released: April 15, 1997
- Recorded: 1974
- Genre: Soft rock
- Length: 34:05
- Label: Rhino

Professional ratings
Review scores
Source	Rating
Allmusic	link

1. "The Air That I Breathe" — The Hollies (4:12)
2. "Laughter in the Rain" — Neil Sedaka (2:51)
3. "Please Come to Boston" — Dave Loggins (4:09)
4. "Haven't Got Time for the Pain" — Carly Simon (3:39)
5. "Seasons in the Sun" — Terry Jacks (3:30)
6. "I'll Have to Say I Love You in a Song" — Jim Croce (2:33)
7. "Angie Baby" — Helen Reddy (3:27)
8. "My Eyes Adored You" — Frankie Valli (3:33)
9. "Tin Man" — America (3:28)
10. "A Very Special Love Song" — Charlie Rich (2:43)
