= Billboard Top Pop Hits =

Series of compilation albums

Billboard Top Pop Hits is a series of compilation albums released by Rhino Records in 1994 and 1995, each featuring ten recordings from the easy listening charts from a specific year in the 1960s. Ten albums in the series were released, one each for the years from 1960 to 1969.

The tracks compiled for the series represented the "lighter" side of popular music in the 1960s. All of the tracks were major hits on the Billboard Hot 100 chart during the year as well as its new Easy Listening chart, which debuted in 1961.

The series follows chronologically from the previous Rhino series of pop standards from the 1920s through the 1950s called Billboard Pop Memories. It continues on in a series of soft rock hits from 1970 through 1974 with Billboard Top Soft Rock Hits.

== 1960 ==
Billboard Top Pop Hits: 1960

Compilation album by Various artists
- Released: July 19, 1994
- Recorded: 1960
- Genre: Pop rock
- Length: 26:41
- Label: Rhino

Professional ratings
Review scores
Source	Rating
Allmusic	3/5 stars

Songs in this volume which topped the Billboard Hot 100 are "Teen Angel" by Mark Dinning, "Theme from 'A Summer Place'" by Percy Faith & His Orchestra (the number one song of 1960), "Everybody's Somebody's Fool" by Connie Francis, "I'm Sorry" by Brenda Lee, "Itsy Bitsy Teenie Weenie Yellow Polka Dot Bikini" by Brian Hyland and "Mr. Custer" by Larry Verne.

1. "Because They're Young" — Duane Eddy & the Rebels (2:01)
2. "I'm Sorry" — Brenda Lee (2:43)
3. "Teen Angel" — Mark Dinning (2:43)
4. "Itsy Bitsy Teenie Weenie Yellow Polka Dot Bikini" — Brian Hyland (2:26)
5. "A Thousand Stars" — Kathy Young with the Innocents (3:14)
6. "Mule Skinner Blues" — Fendermen (2:26)
7. "Everybody's Somebody's Fool" — Connie Francis (2:40)
8. "Mr. Custer" — Larry Verne (3:06)
9. "Night" — Jackie Wilson (2:53)
10. "Theme From 'A Summer Place'" — Percy Faith & His Orchestra (2:23)

== 1961 ==
Billboard Top Pop Hits: 1961

Compilation album by Various artists
- Released: July 19, 1994
- Recorded: 1961
- Genre: Pop rock
- Length: 25:15
- Label: Rhino

Professional ratings
Review scores
Source	Rating
Allmusic	3/5 stars

Two of the songs in the volume topped the Hot 100: "Wooden Heart (Muss I Denn)" by Joe Dowell and "Michael" by The Highwaymen.

1. "Dedicated to the One I Love" — The Shirelles (2:09)
2. "The Mountain's High" — Dick & Dee Dee (2:15)
3. "Apache" — Jorgen Ingmann & His Guitar (3:03)
4. "Wooden Heart (Muss I Denn)" — Joe Dowell (2:05)
5. "The Boil Weevil" — Brook Benton (2:41)
6. "Michael" — The Highwaymen (2:47)
7. "I've Told Ev'ry Little Star" — Linda Scott (2:21)
8. "Moody River" — Pat Boone (2:40)
9. "Run to Him" — Bobby Vee (2:10)
10. "Exodus" — Ferrante & Teicher (2:56)

== 1962 ==
Billboard Top Pop Hits: 1962

Compilation album by Various artists
- Released: July 19, 1994
- Recorded: 1962
- Genre: Pop rock
- Length: 26:02
- Label: Rhino

Professional ratings
Review scores
Source	Rating
Allmusic	3/5 stars

Five of the songs in this volume topped the Hot 100: "Hey! Baby" by Bruce Channel, "Don't Break the Heart That Loves You" by Connie Francis, "The Stripper" by David Rose & His Orchestra, "Roses Are Red (My Love)" by Bobby Vinton and "Sherry" by The Four Seasons.

1. "Let's Dance" — Chris Montez (2:27)
2. "Only Love Can Break a Heart" — Gene Pitney (2:49)
3. "Sherry" — The Four Seasons (2:34)
4. "Midnight in Moscow" — Kenny Ball & His Jazzmen (3:02)
5. "Hey! Baby" — Bruce Channel (2:27)
6. "Roses Are Red (My Love)" — Bobby Vinton (2:42)
7. "Don't Break the Heart That Loves You" — Connie Francis (3:04)
8. "Lovers Who Wander" — Dion (2:33)
9. "Norman" — Sue Thompson (2:21)
10. "The Stripper" — David Rose & His Orchestra (1:57)

== 1963 ==
Billboard Top Pop Hits: 1963

Compilation album by Various artists
- Released: July 19, 1994
- Recorded: 1963
- Genre: Pop rock
- Length: 27:04
- Label: Rhino

Professional ratings
Review scores
Source	Rating
Allmusic	3/5 stars

Six of the songs in this volume topped the Hot 100: "Walk Right In" by The Rooftop Singers, "Hey Paula" by Paul & Paula, "Sukiyaki" by Kyu Sakamoto, "Blue Velvet" by Bobby Vinton, "I'm Leaving It Up to You" by Dale & Grace and "Dominique" by The Singing Nun.

1. "Walk Right In" — The Rooftop Singers (2:37)
2. "Sukiyaki" — Kyu Sakamoto (3:07)
3. "Hey Paula" — Paul & Paula (2:32)
4. "Pipeline" — Chantays (2:23)
5. "Rhythm of the Rain" — The Cascades (2:34)
6. "Blue Velvet" — Bobby Vinton (2:52)
7. "Dominique" — The Singing Nun (2:59)
8. "I'm Leaving It Up to You" — Dale & Grace (2:12)
9. "Sally Go 'Round the Roses" — The Jaynetts (3:03)
10. "Wipe Out" — The Surfaris (2:38)

== 1964 ==
Billboard Top Pop Hits: 1964

Compilation album by Various artists
- Released: July 19, 1994
- Recorded: 1964
- Genre: Pop rock
- Length: 24:46
- Label: Rhino

Professional ratings
Review scores
Source	Rating
Allmusic	3/5 stars

Four songs in this volume topped the Hot 100 singles chart: "There! I've Said It Again" by Bobby Vinton; "Hello, Dolly!" by Louis Armstrong & the All Stars; "A World Without Love" by Peter & Gordon and "Come See About Me" by The Supremes.

1. "Fun, Fun, Fun" — The Beach Boys (2:20)
2. "A World Without Love" — Peter & Gordon (2:42)
3. "Come See About Me" — The Supremes (2:43)
4. "There! I've Said It Again" — Bobby Vinton (2:23)
5. "G.T.O." — Ronny & the Daytonas (2:32)
6. "Hello, Dolly!" — Louis Armstrong & the All Stars (2:26)
7. "Popsicles and Icicles" — The Murmaids (2:33)
8. "Surfin' Bird" — The Trashmen (2:24)
9. "Hey Little Cobra" — Rip Chords (2:04)
10. "You Don't Own Me" — Lesley Gore (2:31)

== 1965 ==
Billboard Top Pop Hits: 1965

Compilation album by Various artists
- Released: 1995
- Recorded: 1965
- Genre: Pop rock
- Length: 25:28
- Label: Rhino

Professional ratings
Review scores
Source	Rating
Allmusic	3/5 stars

Four songs in this volume topped the Hot 100: "My Girl" by The Temptations, "Stop! In the Name of Love" by The Supremes, "I'm Telling You Now" by Freddie and the Dreamers and "Game of Love" by Wayne Fontana & the Mindbenders.

1. "The Game of Love" — Wayne Fontana & the Mindbenders (2:11)
2. "The Birds and the Bees" — Jewel Akens (2:14)
3. "You Were on My Mind" — We Five (2:41)
4. "California Girls" — The Beach Boys (2:41)
5. "My Girl" — The Temptations (2:58)
6. "Love Potion No. 9" — The Searchers (2:07)
7. "The Boy from New York City" — The Ad Libs (3:03)
8. "I'm Telling You Now" — Freddie and the Dreamers (2:11)
9. "Just a Little" — The Beau Brummels (2:24)
10. "Stop! In the Name of Love" — The Supremes (2:51)

== 1966 ==
Billboard Top Pop Hits: 1966

Compilation album by Various artists
- Released: 1995
- Recorded: 1966
- Genre: Pop rock
- Length: 27:39
- Label: Rhino

Professional ratings
Review scores
Source	Rating
Allmusic	3/5 stars

Five of the songs in this volume were number-one hits on the Hot 100 chart: "The Ballad of the Green Berets" by Ssgt. Barry Sadler, "Sunshine Superman" by Donovan, "Cherish" by The Association, "Last Train to Clarksville" by The Monkees and "Winchester Cathedral" by The New Vaudeville Band. In addition, "Ballad of the Green Berets" was the #1 song of the year. It also peaked at number two on the Hot Country Singles chart.

1. "She's Just My Style" — Gary Lewis & the Playboys
2. "Red Rubber Ball" — The Cyrkle
3. "No Matter What Shape (Your Stomach's In)" — The T-Bones
4. "The Ballad of the Green Berets" — Ssgt. Barry Sadler
5. "Sloop John B" — The Beach Boys
6. "Sunshine Superman" — Donovan
7. "Daydream" — The Lovin' Spoonful
8. "Winchester Cathedral" — The New Vaudeville Band
9. "Cherish" — The Association
10. "Last Train to Clarksville" — The Monkees

== 1967 ==
Billboard Top Pop Hits: 1967

Compilation album by Various artists
- Released: 1995
- Recorded: 1967
- Genre: Pop rock
- Length: 30:59
- Label: Rhino

Professional ratings
Review scores
Source	Rating
Allmusic	3/5 stars

Two songs in this volume — "Ode to Billie Joe" by Bobbie Gentry and "To Sir, with Love" by Lulu — topped the Billboard Hot 100. "Ode to Billie Joe" was also a hit on the Hot Country Singles chart during 1967. "To Sir with Love" was the #1 song of the year.

1. "A Whiter Shade of Pale" — Procol Harum (4:02)
2. "San Francisco (Be Sure to Wear Flowers in Your Hair)" — Scott McKenzie (3:02)
3. "A Little Bit Me, A Little Bit You" — The Monkees (2:49)
4. "To Sir, with Love" — Lulu (2:47)
5. "Sweet Soul Music" — Arthur Conley (2:23)
6. "(We Ain't Got) Nothin' Yet" — Blues Magoos (2:20)
7. "Never My Love" — The Association (3:06)
8. "Sock It to Me, Baby!" — Mitch Ryder & the Detroit Wheels (3:03)
9. "Ode to Billie Joe" — Bobbie Gentry (4:17)
10. "Dedicated to the One I Love" — The Mamas & The Papas (2:58)

== 1968 ==
Billboard Top Pop Hits: 1968

Compilation album by Various artists
- Released: 1995
- Recorded: 1968
- Genre: Pop rock
- Length: 32:02
- Label: Rhino

Professional ratings
Review scores
Source	Rating
Allmusic	3/5 stars

Three songs in this volume — "Love is Blue" by Paul Mauriat, "Honey" by Bobby Goldsboro and "Harper Valley PTA" by Jeannie C. Riley — topped the Billboard Hot 100. In addition, "Honey" and "Harper Valley PTA" both reached number one on the Hot Country Singles chart.

1. "Classical Gas" — Mason Williams
2. "A Beautiful Morning" — The Rascals
3. "Honey" — Bobby Goldsboro
4. "Love Is Blue" — Paul Mauriat
5. "Young Girl" — Gary Puckett
6. "Spooky" — Classics IV
7. "Harper Valley PTA" — Jeannie C. Riley
8. "Abraham, Martin and John" — Dion
9. "Slip Away" — Clarence Carter
10. "Hush" — Deep Purple

== 1969 ==
Billboard Top Pop Hits: 1969

Compilation album by Various artists
- Released: 1995
- Recorded: 1969
- Genre: Pop rock
- Length: 30:31
- Label: Rhino

Professional ratings
Review scores
Source	Rating
Allmusic	3/5 stars

Three songs in this volume — "Love Theme from Romeo and Juliet" by Henry Mancini, "In the Year 2525 (Exordium & Terminus)" by Zager & Evans and "Wedding Bell Blues" by The 5th Dimension — topped the Billboard Hot 100. In addition, "Wichita Lineman" by Glen Campbell reached number one on the Hot Country Singles chart.

1. "Spinning Wheel" — Blood Sweat & Tears (4:06)
2. "Hawaii Five-O" — The Ventures
3. "Wedding Bell Blues" — The 5th Dimension
4. "In the Year 2525 (Exordium & Terminus)" — Zager & Evans
5. "Wichita Lineman" — Glen Campbell
6. "Jean" — Oliver
7. "The Worst That Could Happen" — Brooklyn Bridge
8. "Love Theme From 'Romeo and Juliet'" — Henry Mancini
9. "Sweet Cherry Wine" — Tommy James & the Shondells
10. "Soulful Strut" — Young-Holt Unlimited (3:01)
