= Porgy =

Porgy may refer to:

- Porgy (novel), a 1925 novel by DuBose Heyward
- Porgy (play), a 1927 play by Dorothy Heyward and DuBose Heyward, based upon his 1925 novel
- Porgy (fish), a common name for fishes in the family Sparidae
- Porgy Key, a small island in the Florida Keys
- Porgy (album)
- Porgy, a game developed for the 2024 Video game compilation UFO 50

== See also ==
- Porgy and Bess (disambiguation)
- Georgy Porgy (disambiguation)
