= Billboard Pop Memories =

Compilation album by Various artists
- Released: February 22, 1994
- Recorded: 1920s–1950s
- Genre: Pop
- Label: Rhino

Billboard Pop Memories is a series of compilation albums released by Rhino Records in 1994, each featuring ten hit recordings spanning a five- or ten-year period from the 1920s through the 1950s.

The tracks from the 1940s and 1950s compilations were major hits on the various Billboard magazine best-sellers, jockeys and jukebox charts.

As the rock era moved into full swing, chronologically the series continues with "lighter" hits from the 1960s in the Billboard Top Pop Hits series of albums. These were followed up by sets of adult contemporary and easy listening music from 1970 through 1974 with the Billboard Top Soft Rock Hits series.

== The 1920s ==
Professional ratings
Review scores
Source	Rating
Allmusic	link

1. "Valencia" - Paul Whiteman & His Orchestra
2. "My Blue Heaven" - Gene Austin
3. "Sonny Boy" - Al Jolson
4. "Charmaine!" - Guy Lombardo & His Royal Canadians
5. "The Prisoner's Song" - Vernon Dalhart
6. "Whispering" - Paul Whiteman & His Ambassador Orchestra
7. "April Showers" - Al Jolson
8. "Swingin' Down the Lane" - Isham Jones Orchestra
9. "Ramona" - Gene Austin
10. "Dardanella" - Selvin's Novelty Orchestra

== The 1930s ==
Professional ratings
Review scores
Source	Rating
Allmusic	link

1. "Begin the Beguine" - Artie Shaw and His Orchestra
2. "Deep Purple" - Larry Clinton and His Orchestra
3. "Sing, Sing, Sing (With a Swing)" - Benny Goodman and His Orchestra
4. "Pennies from Heaven" - Bing Crosby
5. "The Stein Song (University of Maine)" - Rudy Vallée and His Connecticut Yankees
6. "Boo-Hoo" - Guy Lombardo and His Royal Canadians
7. "Night and Day" - Leo Reisman and His Orchestra
8. "Mood Indigo" - Duke Ellington and His Cotton Club Orchestra
9. "Over the Rainbow" - Judy Garland
10. "Moonlight Serenade" - Glenn Miller and His Orchestra

== 1940–1944 ==
Professional ratings
Review scores
Source	Rating
Allmusic	link

1. "I've Heard That Song Before" (From Youth on Parade) – Helen Forrest, Harry James & His Orchestra
2. "Frenesi" - Artie Shaw & His Orchestra
3. "Paper Doll" - The Mills Brothers
4. "Swinging on a Star" (From Going My Way) - Bing Crosby, John Scott Trotter and The Williams Brothers Quartet
5. "I'll Never Smile Again" - Tommy Dorsey & His Orchestra
6. "Amapola" - Jimmy Dorsey & His Orchestra with Bob Eberly
7. "You'll Never Know" (From Hello, Frisco, Hello) - Dick Haymes & The Song Spinners
8. "Don't Fence Me In" - Bing Crosby & The Andrews Sisters
9. "In the Mood" - Glenn Miller and His Orchestra
10. "Stardust" - Artie Shaw & His Orchestra

== 1945–1949 ==
Professional ratings
Review scores
Source	Rating
Allmusic	link

1. "Riders in the Sky (A Cowboy Legend)" - Vaughn Monroe & His Orchestra
2. "Mañana (Is Soon Enough for Me)" - Peggy Lee
3. "Heartaches" - Ted Weems & His Orchestra
4. "The Old Lamp-Lighter" - Sammy Kaye
5. "My Dreams Are Getting Better All the Time" (From In Society) – Doris Day, Les Brown & His Orchestra
6. "The Gypsy" - The Ink Spots
7. "Buttons and Bows" (from The Paleface) - Dinah Shore and Her Happy Valley Boys
8. "Rumors Are Flying" - Frankie Carle & His Orchestra
9. "Cruising Down the River" - Russ Morgan & His Orchestra
10. "Sentimental Journey" - Les Brown & His Orchestra

== 1950–1954 ==
Professional ratings
Review scores
Source	Rating
Allmusic	link

1. "Rags To Riches" - Tony Bennett
2. "The Tennessee Waltz" - Patti Page
3. "The Song from Moulin Rouge (Where Is Your Heart)" (From Moulin Rouge) – Felicia Sanders, Percy Faith & His Orchestra
4. "How High the Moon" (from Two for the Show) - Les Paul and Mary Ford
5. "You Belong to Me" - Jo Stafford
6. "Cry" - Johnnie Ray and The Four Lads
7. "Wheel of Fortune" - Kay Starr
8. "Oh! My Pa-Pa (Oh Mein Papa)" - Eddie Fisher
9. "Come On-A My House" - Rosemary Clooney
10. "Goodnight Irene" - Gordon Jenkins and The Weavers

== 1955–1959 ==
Professional ratings
Review scores
Source	Rating
Allmusic	link

1. "Memories Are Made of This" — Dean Martin
2. "The Wayward Wind" — Gogi Grant
3. "Unchained Melody" (from Unchained) — Les Baxter
4. "Love Letters in the Sand" — Pat Boone
5. "It's All in the Game" — Tommy Edwards
6. "Love Is a Many-Splendored Thing" (From Love Is a Many-Splendored Thing) — The Four Aces
7. "Cherry Pink and Apple Blossom White (Cerezo Rosa)" (from Underwater!) — Perez "Prez" Pardo & His Orchestra
8. "Sleep Walk" — Santo & Johnny
9. "Sincerely" — The McGuire Sisters
10. "Moonglow and Theme from Picnic" — Morris Stoloff and the Columbia Pictures Orchestra
