= List of Billboard Easy Listening number ones of 1971 =

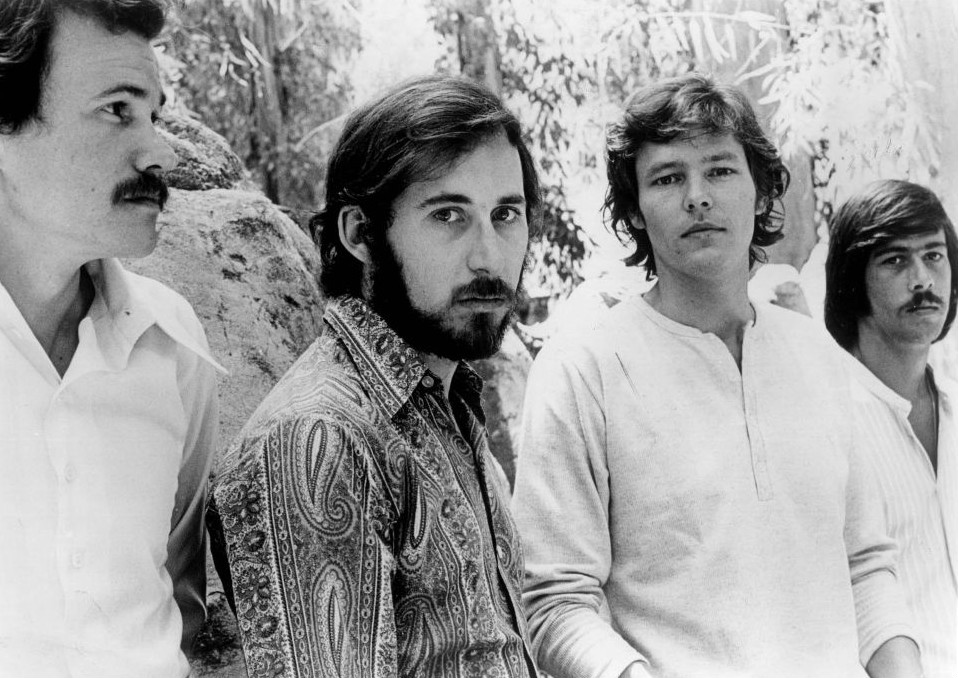
Bread had two number ones in 1971.

In 1971, Billboard magazine published a chart ranking the top-performing songs in the United States in the easy listening market. The chart, which in 1971 was entitled Easy Listening, has undergone various name changes and has been published under the title Adult Contemporary since 1996. In 1971, 19 songs topped the chart based on playlists submitted by easy listening radio stations and sales reports submitted by stores.

In the issue of Billboard dated January 2, "One Less Bell to Answer" by the 5th Dimension moved into the number one position, replacing "It's Impossible" by Perry Como. The song held the top spot for a single week before Bobby Goldsboro's "Watching Scotty Grow" took its place at number one. Goldsboro's song topped the chart for six consecutive weeks, the year's longest unbroken run at number one. The Carpenters spent the most total weeks at number one in 1971, occupying the top spot for a total of nine weeks with "For All We Know", "Rainy Days and Mondays" and "Superstar". The brother-sister duo was the only act to achieve three number ones during the year; the 5th Dimension and Bread were the only other acts to take more than one single to the top of the chart in 1971.

Two of 1971's Easy Listening number ones also topped Billboard's pop singles chart, the Hot 100; both songs were written, solely or in part, by Carole King. King spent five weeks atop the Easy Listening chart in June and July with "It's Too Late", for which she wrote the music but not the lyrics. It was immediately followed into the top spot by James Taylor's recording of "You've Got a Friend", written entirely by King, which spent a single week at number one. The two songs each spent the same number of weeks at number one on the Hot 100. Taylor's song was replaced atop the Easy Listening chart by Olivia Newton-John's cover version of Bob Dylan's "If Not for You", the first major U.S. success for the British-Australian singer who would be a regular during the 1970s in the upper reaches of Billboard's easy listening, country, and pop charts. The final Easy Listening number one of 1971 was "All I Ever Need Is You" by Sonny & Cher.

== Chart history ==
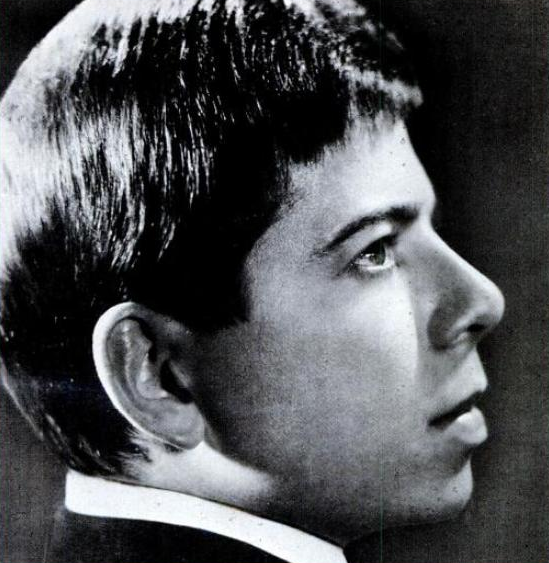
Bobby Goldsboro spent six consecutive weeks at number one with "Watching Scotty Grow", the longest unbroken run of the year.

Carole King spent five weeks in the top spot with "It's Too Late".

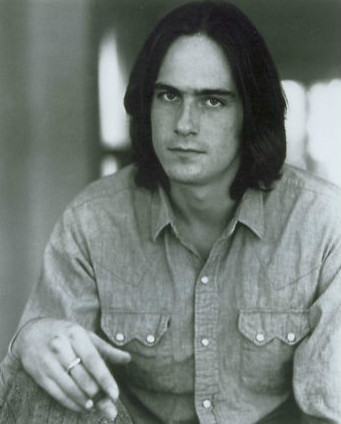
James Taylor replaced King at number one with his cover version of her song "You've Got a Friend".

Chart history
Issue date	Title	Artist(s)	Ref.
January 2	"One Less Bell to Answer"	The 5th Dimension	
January 9	"Watching Scotty Grow"	Bobby Goldsboro	
January 16	"Watching Scotty Grow"	Bobby Goldsboro	
January 23	"Watching Scotty Grow"	Bobby Goldsboro	
January 30	"Watching Scotty Grow"	Bobby Goldsboro	
February 6	"Watching Scotty Grow"	Bobby Goldsboro	
February 13	"Watching Scotty Grow"	Bobby Goldsboro	
February 20	"If You Could Read My Mind"	Gordon Lightfoot	
February 27	"For All We Know"	The Carpenters	
March 6	"For All We Know"	The Carpenters	
March 13	"For All We Know"	The Carpenters	
March 20	"(Where Do I Begin?) Love Story"	Andy Williams	
March 27	"(Where Do I Begin?) Love Story"	Andy Williams	
April 3	"When There's No You"	Engelbert Humperdinck	
April 10	"(Where Do I Begin?) Love Story"	Andy Williams	
April 17	"(Where Do I Begin?) Love Story"	Andy Williams	
April 24	"If"	Bread	
May 1	"If"	Bread	
May 8	"If"	Bread	
May 15	"Me and You and a Dog Named Boo"	Lobo	
May 22	"Me and You and a Dog Named Boo"	Lobo	
May 29	"Rainy Days and Mondays"	The Carpenters	
June 5	"Rainy Days and Mondays"	The Carpenters	
June 12	"Rainy Days and Mondays"	The Carpenters	
June 19	"Rainy Days and Mondays"	The Carpenters	
June 26	"It's Too Late"	Carole King	
July 3	"It's Too Late"	Carole King	
July 10	"It's Too Late"	Carole King	
July 17	"It's Too Late"	Carole King	
July 24	"It's Too Late"	Carole King	
July 31	"You've Got a Friend"	James Taylor	
August 7	"If Not for You"	Olivia Newton-John	
August 14	"If Not for You"	Olivia Newton-John	
August 21	"If Not for You"	Olivia Newton-John	
August 28	"Beginnings"	Chicago	
September 4	"The Night They Drove Old Dixie Down"	Joan Baez	
September 11	"The Night They Drove Old Dixie Down"	Joan Baez	
September 18	"The Night They Drove Old Dixie Down"	Joan Baez	
September 25	"The Night They Drove Old Dixie Down"	Joan Baez	
October 2	"The Night They Drove Old Dixie Down"	Joan Baez	
October 9	"Superstar"	The Carpenters	
October 16	"Superstar"	The Carpenters	
October 23	"Never My Love"	The 5th Dimension	
October 30	"Peace Train"	Cat Stevens	
November 6	"Peace Train"	Cat Stevens	
November 13	"Peace Train"	Cat Stevens	
November 20	"Baby I'm-a Want You"	Bread	
November 27	"All I Ever Need Is You"	Sonny & Cher	
December 4	"All I Ever Need Is You"	Sonny & Cher	
December 11	"All I Ever Need Is You"	Sonny & Cher	
December 18	"All I Ever Need Is You"	Sonny & Cher	
December 25	"All I Ever Need Is You"	Sonny & Cher	
