= San Francisco Is a Lonely Town =

Song by Ben Peters

Single by Ben Peters
- B-side: "You're The Happy Song I Sing"
- Written: 1969
- Released: 1969
- Genre: Country
- Length: 2:40
- Label: Liberty
- Songwriter: Ben Peters

"San Francisco Is a Lonely Town" is a song written in 1969 by the Nashville songwriter Ben Peters. Two versions of the song charted in 1969 – one by Ben Peters himself (#46 country, Peters' only charting hit), and the single by Joe Simon, which reached #79 on the US pop charts, #29 on the R&B charts.

== Review ==
The novelist and songwriter Alice Randall reviewed Linda Martell's album Color Me Country in 2010, and wrote:

The second cut, the Ben Peters–penned "San Francisco Is a Lonely Town," is a variation on the Harlan Howard masterpiece "Streets of Baltimore." Here a young couple sets off on a Greyhound for San Francisco, only to discover the distractions of the big city dilute love. Peters, who wrote a signature song for country legend Charley Pride ("Kiss an Angel Good Morning"), captures the spunk and sorrow of the adventure—but more interestingly, Martell's performance captures a bit of San Francisco few have seen—the kids who arrived not in beat-up Volkswagens but on the bus; the kids who weren't white, who were brown; the kids who came not from Eastern cities, but from Southern towns. Linda Martell portrays just such a girl-woman convincingly.

== Other versions ==
Other versions of the song released in 1969 and after, were by:

- Roberta Sherwood (single)
- Mel Carter (single)
- Eddy Arnold on his album The Warmth of Eddy,
- Fred Hughes on his album Baby Boy,
- Charlie Rich on his album The Fabulous Charlie Rich, The Charlie Rich version was remixed by the French group Nouvelle Vague on the 2007 remix album Late Night Tales: Nouvelle Vague.
- O. C. Smith on his album O.C. Smith at Home.
- Linda Martell, the African-American country artist, recorded the song on her 1970 album Color Me Country.
- Vikki Carr put the tune on her 1971 album The Ways to Love a Man.
- Glen Campbell recorded it on his 1976 album Bloodline,
- Jimmy "Orion" Ellis on his 1979 album Sunrise.
- Nick Nixon, whose version reached #86 on the country charts in 1979.
