= La La Peace Song (O. C. Smith album) =

Studio album by O. C. Smith
- Released: 1974
- Genre: Soul
- Label: Columbia KC 33247
- Producer: Gamble & Huff; Jerry Fuller; Johnny Bristol

O. C. Smith chronology
Help Me Make it Through the Night (1971)	La La Peace Song (1974)	Together (1977)

La La Peace Song is a 1974 album by American singer O. C. Smith. It was produced by Johnny Bristol, Gamble & Huff, Thom Bell, Jerry Fuller and Snuff Garrett. Linda Creed was one of the composers on the album.

== Track listing ==
Track listing
No	Title	Composer	Time
A1	"La La Peace Song"		3:27
A2	"Don't Misunderstand"		3:05
A3	"When Morning Comes"		3:01
A4	"Friend, Lover, Woman, Wife"		3:08
A5	"My Cherie Amour"		3:08
B1	"Wish You Were Here With Me Baby"		3:23
B2	"I Think I'll Tell Her"		3:41
B3	"Daddy's Little Man"		4:05
B4	"Baby, I Need Your Loving"		2:55
B5	"The Son Of Hickory Holler's Tramp"		3:50
