= E. Power Biggs =

British-born American concert organist and recording artist

- From Biggs's CD, Bach: The Four Great Toccatas and Fugues.
- Born: March 29, 1906; Westcliff-on-Sea, England, UK
- Died: March 10, 1977 (aged 70); Cambridge, Massachusetts, U.S.
- Occupations: Organist, harpsichordist
- Spouses: Colette Josephine Lionne, pianist (1933–1944) (divorced); Margaret Allen ("Peggy") (1945–1977) (his death)

Edward George Power Biggs (March 29, 1906 – March 10, 1977) was a British-born American concert organist and recording artist.

== Biography ==
Biggs was born in Westcliff-on-Sea, Essex, England; a year later, the family moved to the Isle of Wight. Biggs was trained in London at the Royal Academy of Music, where he studied with G. D. Cunningham. Biggs immigrated to the United States in 1930. In 1932, he was appointed to a post at Christ Church in Cambridge, Massachusetts, where he resided for the rest of his life. His position as an organist, however, did not last long; believing that his concert work conflicted with his job, the rector dismissed him from the position. As one of the boy choristers (Charles Fisk) noted: “I went to choir practice, Mr. Bigs [sic] wasn’t there".

Biggs did much to bring the classical pipe organ back to prominence, and was in the forefront of the mid-20th-century resurgence of interest in the organ music of pre-Romantic composers. On his first concert tour of Europe, in 1954, Biggs performed and recorded works of Johann Sebastian Bach, Sweelinck, Dieterich Buxtehude, and Pachelbel on historic organs associated with those composers. Thereafter, he believed that such music should ideally be performed on instruments representative of that period and that organ music of that epoch should be played by using (as closely as possible) the styles and registrations of that era. Thus, he gave significant impetus to the American revival of organ building in the style of European Baroque instruments, seen especially in the increasing popularity of tracker organs—analogous to Europe's Orgelbewegung.

Among other instruments, Biggs championed G. Donald Harrison's Baroque-style unenclosed, unencased instrument with 24 stops and electric action (produced by Aeolian-Skinner in 1937 and installed in Harvard's Busch-Reisinger Museum, Cambridge, Massachusetts) and the three-manual Flentrop tracker organ subsequently installed there in 1958. Many of his CBS radio broadcasts and Columbia recordings were made in the museum. Another remarkable instrument used by Biggs was a pedal harpsichord by John Challis; Biggs made recordings of the music of J. S. Bach, Vivaldi, and even went as far afield as Scott Joplin and Tchaikovsky on this instrument.

Biggs' critics of the time included rival concert organist Virgil Fox, who was known for a more flamboyant and colorful style of performance. Fox decried Biggs' insistence on historical accuracy, claiming that it was "relegating the organ to a museum piece". Artistic rivalries aside, many observers agree that Biggs "should be given great credit for his innovative ideas as far as the musical material he recorded, and for making the organs he recorded even more famous." Despite different approaches, both artists enjoyed hugely successful careers and Biggs rose to the top of his profession. In addition to concerts and recording, Biggs taught at the Longy School of Music in Cambridge, Massachusetts, at various times in his career and edited a large body of organ music.

Biggs was elected a fellow of the American Academy of Arts and Sciences in 1950. He was one of the artists honored to celebrate the New York Philharmonic's 125th birthday celebrations in December 1967.

Between 1942 and 1958, he also hosted a weekly radio program of organ music (carried throughout the United States on the CBS Radio Network) that introduced audiences to the pipe organ and its literature.

== Death ==
Biggs died March 10, 1977, in Deaconess Hospital in Boston, following an operation for bleeding ulcers. He was survived by his wife, Margaret Allen Biggs. A memorial service was held in The Memorial Church, Harvard University.

== Awards and recognition ==
- Grammy Award for Best Choral Performance (other than opera)
  - Vittorio Negri (conductor), George Bragg, Gregg Smith, (choir directors), E. Power Biggs, the Edward Tarr Ensemble, the Gregg Smith Singers & the Texas Boys Choir for The Glory of Gabrieli (Music For Multiple Choirs, Brass And Organ)
- Grammy Award for Best Chamber Music Performance
  - Vittorio Negri (conductor), E. Power Biggs & the Edward Tarr Ensemble, for The Glory of Gabrieli Vol. II (Canzonas for Brass, Winds, Strings and Organ)

== Selected discography ==
For his contribution to the recording industry, Biggs has a star on California's Hollywood Walk of Fame at 6522 Hollywood Boulevard. He mainly recorded solo organ music, but there are recordings of Biggs collaborating with singers and instrumentalists, for example in the music of Giovanni Gabrieli.

Biggs recorded extensively for the Columbia Masterworks Records and RCA Victor labels for more than three decades. He was represented by Mercury Music in the 1950s.

External audio
- You may listen to E. Power Biggs with Adrian Boult and the London Philharmonic Orchestra performing George Frederick Handel's Organ Concerto in B-flat Op. 7 No. 4 in 1959
- You may listen to E. Power Biggs performing on "Bach Organ Favorites, Vol. 3" in 1968; Here on archive.org
- You may hear E. Power Biggs on the album "Mozart: The Music for Solo Organ-Played on the Mozart Organ at Haarlem" in 1966; Here on archive.org

- Works for Organ: Essential Classics (1961)
- Bach: Organ Favorites recorded on the Flentrop Organ in the Busch-Reisinger Museum of Harvard University, MS 6261 (1961)
- The Golden Age of the Organ, Columbia Masterworks ML-5754 (1962) (A tribute to German organ builder Arp Schnitger), organs in Germany and the Netherlands (1963)
- Heroic Music for Organ, Brass and Percussion, Columbia Masterworks M2S 697
- Bach Organ Favorites, Vol. 2, Columbia Masterworks MS 6748 (1965)
- Mozart: The Music for Solo Organ—Played on the "Mozart" organ at Haarlem, Columbia Masterworks MS 6856 (1966)
- Bach Organ Favorites, Vol. 3, Columbia Masterworks MS 7108 (1968)
- E. Power Biggs' Greatest Hits, Columbia Masterworks MS 7269 (1969)
- Bach Organ Favorites, Vol. 4, Columbia Masterworks MS 7424 (1970)
- Plays Bach in the Thomaskirche, Columbia Masterworks M30648 (1971)
- Bach Organ Favorites, Vol. 5, Columbia Masterworks M 31424 (1972)
- Bach Organ Favorites, Vol. 6, Columbia Masterworks M 32791 (1974)
- Bach: Four Great Toccatas & Fugues (Cathedral of Freiburg), Columbia Masterworks M 32933 (1974)
- Bach Eight Little Preludes and Concerto in D after Vivaldi, Columbia Masterworks M 33975 (1975)
- Stars and Stripes Forever: Two Centuries of Heroic Music in America, Columbia Masterworks 81507 (1976)
- Variations on Popular Songs, Columbia Masterworks AMS 6337
- A Festival of French Organ Music, Columbia Masterworks MS 6307
- Buxtehude at Lüneburg, Columbia Masterworks MS 6944
- The Organ in America, Columbia Masterworks MS 6161
- Historic Organs of England, Columbia Masterworks M 30445
- Historic Organs of France, Columbia Masterworks MS 7438
- Historic Organs of Italy, Columbia Masterworks MS 7379
- Historic Organs of Spain, Columbia Masterworks MS 7109
- Historic Organs of Switzerland, Columbia Masterworks MS 6855
- The Four Antiphonal Organs of the Cathedral of Freiburg, Columbia Masterworks M 33514 (music of Handel, Purcell, Mozart, Buxtehude, et al.)

External audio
- You may listen to E. Power Biggs performing Johann Sebastian Bach's Prelude and Fugue in E flat major ("St. Anne"), BWV 552 in 1959; Here on Archive.org
- You may listen to E. Power Biggs performing on "Bach Organ Favorites, Vol. 3" in 1968; Here on archive.org

- Bach on the Pedal Harpsichord, Columbia Masterworks MS 6804
- Bach: The Six Trio Sonatas (Pedal Harpsichord), Columbia Masterworks M2S 764
- Holiday for Harpsichord, Columbia Masterworks ML 6728
- A Mozart Organ Tour, Columbia Masterworks K3L 231
- Bach: The Little Organ Book, Columbia Masterworks KSL 227
- The Art of the Organ, Columbia Masterworks KSL 219, recorded on twenty different European organs.
- Heroic Music for Organ, Brass, and Percussion, Columbia Masterworks MS 6354
- Mozart: Festival Sonatas for Organ and Orchestra, Columbia Masterworks MS 6857
- Haydn: The Three Organ Concertos, Columbia Masterworks MS 6682
- The Magnificent Mr. Handel, Columbia Masterworks M 30058
- The Organ in Sight and Sound, Columbia Masterworks KS 7263 (A technical discussion of the organ and its history)
- The Organ Concertos of Handel, Nos. 1–6, Columbia Masterworks K2S 602 (with Sir Adrian Boult)
- The Organ Concertos of Handel, Nos. 7–12, Columbia Masterworks K2S 604 (with Sir Adrian Boult)
- The Organ Concertos of Handel, Nos. 13–16, Columbia Masterworks K2S 611 (with Sir Adrian Boult)
- The Organ, Columbia Masterworks DL 5288
- Bach at Zwolle, Columbia Masterworks KS-6005
- Hindemith: Three Sonatas For Organ, Columbia Masterworks MS 6234
- Famous Organs of Holland and North Germany, Columbia Masterworks M31961
- Music of Jubilee, Columbia Masterworks ML 6015 (Bach Sinfonias, with Zoltan Rozsnyai)
- Soler: Six Concerti for Two Organs, Columbia Masterworks ML 5608 (with Daniel Pinkham)
- Plays Scott Joplin on the Pedal Harpsichord, Columbia Masterworks M32495
- Heroic Music for Organ, Brass & Percussion, Columbia Masterworks MS 6354 (with the New England Brass Ensemble)
- Music for Organ and Brass: Canzonas of Gabrieli and Frescobaldi, Columbia Masterworks MS 6117
- Music for Organ, Brass and Percussion: Music of Gigout, Dupré, Campra, Widor, Strauss, Purcell, Clarke, and Karg-Elert, Columbia Masterworks M31193 (with the Columbia Brass and Percussion Ensemble, Maurice Peress, conductor)
- Mendelssohn in St. Paul's Cathedral, Columbia Masterworks MS 6087

External audio
- You may listen to E. Power Biggs performing music by Johann Sebastian Bach on his album: "The Biggs Bach Book"; Here on archive.org
- You may listen to E. Power Biggs with Eugene Ormandy conducting the Philadelphia Orchestra in Camille Saint-Saens Symphony No. 3 in C minor, Op. 78 ("Organ Symphony") in 1963; Here on archive.org

- The Glory of Gabrieli Columbia Masterworks MS-7071
- What Child Is This? Traditional Christmas Music, Columbia Masterworks MS 7164
- Bach: Toccata in D Minor, Bach's Toccata in D Minor recorded on 14 of Europe's finest organs, Columbia Masterworks ML 5032
- Rheinberger: Two Concertos For Organ and Orchestra, Columbia Masterworks M32297
