= Trinity Valley School =

Location
- 7500 Dutch Branch Road; Fort Worth, Texas; United States; 32.653829°N 97.426704°W

Information
- Type: Private
- Motto: Per Aspera Ad Astra ("Through adversity to the stars")
- Established: 1959
- Head of school: Ben Courchesne
- Faculty: 104 (Full-time)
- Grades: PK-12
- Enrollment: 1,005 (2025-2026)
- Campus: 75 acres
- Colors: Columbia blue, Royal Blue, White
- Mascot: Trojan
- Website: tvs.org

Trinity Valley School (TVS) is a co-ed independent school located in Fort Worth, Texas. Trinity Valley School is a member of the Southwest Preparatory Conference and is accredited by the Independent Schools Association of the Southwest (ISAS). The school serves pre-kindergarten through twelfth grade.

== History ==
Trinity Valley School was founded in 1959 by George Bragg and Stephen Seleny. They were inspired to start a liberal arts school while on a tour of Europe with the Texas Boys Choir. Seleny became the school's first headmaster, a position he held until 1994. Initially, it was an all-boys school. Girls were first admitted in 1971.

== Demographics ==
As of 2026, Trinity Valley School has a student population of 3,482 that is 0.1% Pacific Islander, 0.5% Native American, 3.8% black, 4.8% unknown, 5.4% multiracial, 6.4% Hispanic, 7.8% Asian, and 71.3% white.

== Notable alumni ==
- Greg Kwedar, film director and screenwriter
- Tom Williams, football coach
- Andrew Disney, film director and real estate developer
