= O.C. Smith at Home =

O. C. Smith at Home

Studio album by O. C. Smith
- Released: 1969
- Genre: Soul
- Length: 36:23
- Label: Columbia Records
- Producer: Jerry Fuller

O. C. Smith chronology
Hickory Holler Revisited (1968)	O. C. Smith at Home (1969)	For Once in My Life (1969)

O.C. Smith at Home is the third studio LP album by O. C. Smith, originally released in 1969.

== Track listing ==
Side one
No.	Title	Writer(s)	Length
1.	"Daddy's Little Man"	Mac Davis	3:59
2.	"Friend, Lover, Woman, Wife"	Davis	3:08
3.	"Color Him Father"	Richard Spencer	3:20
4.	"Clean Up Your Own Back Yard"	Billy Strange; Davis	3:45
5.	"If I Leave You Now"	O. C. Smith; Red Steagall	3:15

Side two
No.	Title	Writer(s)	Length
1.	"My Cherie Amour"	Henry Cosby; Stevie Wonder; Sylvia Moy	3:11
2.	"The Learning Tree"	Gordon Parks	2:58
3.	"Didn't We"	Jimmy Webb	2:48
4.	"Sweet Changes"	Bobby Weinstein; Michael Leonard	3:22
5.	"San Francisco Is a Lonely Town"	Ben Peters	3:05
6.	"Can't Take My Eyes Off You"	Bob Crewe; Bob Gaudio	3:32

== Charts ==
Chart (1969)	Peak position
US Billboard 200	58
US Top R&B/Hip-Hop Albums (Billboard)	7
