= When People Were Shorter and Lived Near the Water =

American alternative rock band

- Origin: New York, New York, United States
- Genres: Rock, experimental, psychedelic rock
- Years active: 1986–1996
- Labels: Shimmy Disc, Staple Gun, Trace Elements
- Past members: Kim Rancourt; Joe Defilipps; David Raymer; Bob Meetsma; Mitch Strassberg; Ron Spitzer; Dave Rick; David Licht; Chris Xefos

When People Were Shorter and Lived Near the Water was an American experimental psychedelic rock band from New York City active from 1986 to 1996. Their three albums and several EPs consist of experimental cover versions of songs from various genres of popular music.

Trouser Press critics Scott Schinder and David Greenberger wrote that their renditions, which contain both precise and loose arrangements, were "not exactly affectionate tributes, but not complete jokes either," giving the group the double identity of an art rock and party band. Though commercially unsuccessful, they were a critically respected staple of the experimental scene associated with their label Shimmy Disc and shared the stage, as well as several members, with the groups King Missile, Bongwater and Shockabilly.

== History ==
Basing their repertoire around deconstructive cover versions of other artists' songs, the group was formed in 1986 by vocalists Kim Rancourt and Joe Defilipps (the latter of whom also played trombone), guitarists David Raymer and Bob Meetsma, bassist Mitch Strassberg and drummer Ron Spitzer (of Band of Susans). Released on the Trace Elements imprint, their 1987 debut EP included a Ray Davies cover and a recitation of the Gettysburg Address.

Their second EP, Uncle Ben (1988), featured the addition of bassist Dave Rick (of Phantom Tollbooth, King Missile, Bongwater, and Yo La Tengo) and drummer David Licht (of the Klezmatics, Bongwater, Shockabilly, and Eugene Chadbourne's band). The record was also their first release with Shimmy Disc, a like-minded experimental rock label run by Bongwater leader Mark Kramer, who himself frequently played on the group's recordings. The Bobby LP followed in 1989, composed entirely of Bobby Goldsboro covers. Keyboardist and multi-instrumentalist Chris Xefos (also of King Missile) played extensively on the record as a guest and joined as a full-time member thereafter.

In 1991, the band released Porgy, an album of material from Ira and George Gershwin's Porgy and Bess. Their third and final LP, Bill Kennedy's Showtime (1994), comprised songs by semi-obscure 1960s and 1970s Detroit rock and soul bands, as Rancourt had grown up in the area during that time. Talk of an album of material popularized by Louis Armstrong arose as plans for the band's fourth LP, but the record never materialized, and the band became inactive.

Rancourt and Rick next co-founded Shapir-O'Rama, which played original music. They recorded several albums, including two with Jad Fair. Rancourt later formed JFK with Andrew W.K. and Don Fleming. DeFilipps played in After That It's All Gravy, while Xefos, Rick, and Licht remained active with numerous other groups.

== Members ==
- Kim Rancourt – vocals, flute, casio horn (1986–1996)
- Joe Defilipps – vocals, trombone (1986–1996)
- David Raymer – guitar, keyboard, vocals (1986–1996)
- Bob Meetsma – guitar, lap steel guitar, cornet, banjo, saxophone, vocals (1986–1996)
- Mitch Strassberg – bass (1986–1988)
- Ron Spitzer – drums (1986–1988)
- Dave Rick – bass, guitar, vocals (1988–1996)
- David Licht – drums (1988–1996)
- Chris Xefos – keyboards, tuba, accordion, vocals, etc. (1989–1996)

== Discography ==
Albums

- Bobby (1989)
- Porgy (1991)
- Bill Kennedy's Showtime (1993)

Singles

- When People Were Shorter and Lived Near the Water (1987)
- Uncle Ben (1988)
- Tiny E.P. (1990)

Compilation appearances

- Rutles Highway Revisited (1990) – "Let's Be Natural"
- Donovan: Island of Circles (1992) – "The Natural High is the Best High in the World (Riki Tiki Tavi)"
- Surprise Your Pig: A Tribute to R.E.M. (1993) – "I Believe"
