= Hickory Holler Revisited =

Studio album by O. C. Smith
- Released: 1968
- Label: Columbia
- Producer: Jerry Fuller

O. C. Smith chronology
For Once in My Life (1968)	Hickory Holler Revisited (1968)	At Home (1969)

Hickory Holler Revisited is a 1968 album for singer O.C. Smith. It contained his hit song "The Son of Hickory Holler's Tramp".

== Background ==
With O.C. Smith's song "The Son of Hickory Holler's Tramp" now a top 40 hit, Columbia Records ran a full-page ad in the 25 May 1968 issue of Record World alerting the reader that the album had been released.

The album contained three hit singles, "The Son of Hickory Holler's Tramp", "Main Street Mission", and "Little Green Apples".

== Reception ==
The album was one of the Record World Picks of the Week for the week of 15 June 1968.

Del Shields gave a review of the album in his "Taking Care of Business column" in Record World for the week of 13 July. He said that after listening to the album, there was evidence that O.C. Smith was on his way up and his vocal appeal was displayed in the album. His two picks were, The Son of Hickory Holler's Tramp" and "Honey (I Miss You)".

The record was a "Recording of Special Merit" in the October 1968 issue of Hi-Fi Stereo-Review.

== Charts ==
The record debuted at no. 32 in the Record World LPs Coming Up chart for the week of 22 June. It was at no. 6 in the LPs Coming Up chart for the week of 6 July before it made its debut at no. 96 in the 100 Top LPs chart the following week. At week 18, the album peaked at no. 25 in the Record World 100 Top LP'S chart for the week of 9 November.

== Track listing ==
=== Side 1 ===
1. "The Son of Hickory Holler's Tramp"
2. "Sitting on the Dock of the Bay"
3. "Main Street Mission"
4. "By The Time I Get to Phoenix"
5. "Long Black Limousine"
6. "The House Next Door"

=== Side 2 ===
1. "Little Green Apples"
2. "Take Time to Know Her"
3. "Honey (I Miss You)"
4. "The Best Man"
5. "Seven Days"
