= Summer (The First Time) =

Single by Bobby Goldsboro

from the album Summer (The First Time)
- B-side: "Childhood—1949"
- Released: June 29, 1973
- Recorded: April 11, 1973
- Studio: The Sound Shop, Nashville, Tennessee
- Genre: Pop
- Length: 4:37
- Label: United Artists Records
- Songwriter: Bobby Goldsboro
- Producers: Bob Montgomery and Bobby Goldsboro

Bobby Goldsboro singles chronology
"With Pen in Hand" (1972)	"Summer (The First Time)" (1973)	"Hello Summertime" (1974)

"Summer (The First Time)" is a song by American singer Bobby Goldsboro, recorded for his album of the same name and released as a single in June 1973. It was written by Bobby Goldsboro and produced by Goldsboro and Bob Montgomery.

== Background ==
According to Bobby Goldsboro, the song was loosely based on something that happened to him with someone older, but not as romantic as that depicted in the song. The song was recorded largely as Goldsboro had envisioned apart from the piano riff that started the song and repeated throughout the song as well as the ending descending scale, which were written by his pianist conductor Timmy Tappan. The song was preceded by the sounds of ocean waves and seagulls, taken from a sound effect library. The label had wanted to remove these sounds to shorten the song, but Goldsboro insisted that they be kept.

The song is about someone reminiscing about being a 17-year-old boy in his first romantic experience with a 31-year-old woman during the summer. Using a repeating piano riff, 12-string guitar, and an orchestral string arrangement (engineered by Ernie Winfrey), the song was suggestive enough to spark some controversy at the time. The sound of seagulls combined with the string arrangement at the start of the record, which last 57 seconds until the vocals come in, creates the impression of being on a beach in mid-summer. Whilst Goldsboro was writing the music, he and his band made a television appearance on The Tonight Show. During this appearance Goldsboro played part of the song on guitar when musician Tappan first played the piano riff that dominated part of the song.

It has been suggested that the musical theme of the song may have provided inspiration for Jean-Claude Borelly's 1975 hit "Dolannes Melodie".

== Chart history ==
The song was Goldsboro's second UK hit recorded on United Artists Records UP35558 and peaked at number nine in the UK Singles Chart, spending 10 weeks in the UK chart. It reached number seven in Australia, and became a Top 40 Pop and Adult Contemporary hit in both the U.S. and Canada.

=== Weekly charts ===
Chart (1973–74)	Peak position
Australia (Kent Music Report)	7
Canada Adult Contemporary (RPM)	15
Canada Top Singles (RPM)	29
Ireland (IRMA)	16
New Zealand (Listener)	11
Netherlands (Dutch Top 40)	16
UK Singles Chart	9
U.S. Billboard Hot 100	21
US Adult Contemporary (Billboard)	18
US Hot Country Songs (Billboard)	100
US Cash Box Top 100	17

=== Year-end charts ===
Chart (1973)	Rank
Australia	79
Canada	162

== Cover versions ==
Although the German song "Und Es War Sommer" (1976) by Peter Maffay covers the same subject as Goldsboro's song and parts of the song are a literal translation, it can not be considered as a cover, as the melody is different.

Millie Jackson recorded a cover of "Summer (The First Time)" as the closing track of her 1974 album, Caught Up. It was sung from the female perspective with only a few adjustments made to the lyrics.
