= The Straight Life =

Single by Bobby Goldsboro

from the album Word Pictures
- B-side: "Tomorrow Is Forgotten"
- Released: October 1968
- Recorded: RCA Studio B (Nashville, Tennessee)
- Genre: Pop
- Length: 2:40
- Label: United Artists
- Songwriter: Sonny Curtis
- Producers: Bob Montgomery; Bobby Goldsboro

Bobby Goldsboro singles chronology
"Autumn of My Life" (1968)	"The Straight Life" (1968)	"Glad She's a Woman" (1969)

"The Straight Life" is a 1968 song written and originally recorded by Sonny Curtis. It was a top 40 hit for Bobby Goldsboro later that year.

Curtis' version is a track from his album, The Sonny Curtis Style. It reached number 45 on the U.S. country singles chart. Goldsboro's is from his album, Word Pictures. It reached number 36 on the U.S. Billboard Hot 100 and number six on the Easy Listening chart. It also became a hit in Canada (#19).

== Chart history (Bobby Goldsboro version) ==
Chart (1968–1969)	Peak position
Australia (Go-Set)	30
Canada RPM Top Singles	32
Canada RPM Top Singles	19
Canada RPM Country	7
US Billboard Hot 100	36
US Billboard Easy Listening	6
US Billboard Country Singles	37
US Cash Box Top 100	29

== Cover versions ==
- "The Straight Life" was recorded by Glen Campbell on his 1968 LP, Wichita Lineman.
- Bing Crosby recorded the song for his 1969 album, Hey Jude/Hey Bing!.
- Alternative comedian Neil Hamburger recorded a cover version of the song for his 2019 album Still Dwelling.
