= Bill Kennedy's Showtime =

Studio album by When People Were Shorter and Lived Near the Water
- Released: 1993
- Recorded: Noise New Jersey (Jersey City, NJ)
- Genre: Experimental rock
- Length: 46:55
- Label: Shimmy Disc
- Producer: Kramer

When People Were Shorter and Lived Near the Water chronology
Porgy (1991)	Bill Kennedy's Showtime (1993)

Bill Kennedy's Showtime is the third studio album by When People Were Shorter and Lived Near the Water, released in 1993 by Shimmy Disc.

== Track listing ==
No.	Title	Length
1.	"Catfish"	3:34
2.	"Just Like an Aborigine"	3:26
3.	"East Side Story"	2:19
4.	"I Who Have Nothing"	3:39
5.	"Shoe Salesman"	2:33
6.	"Old Time Shimmy"	1:46
7.	"Creepin'"	2:31
8.	"Sock It to Me Baby!"	1:33
9.	"Story of My Life"	2:22
10.	"Whatcha See Is Whatcha Get"	2:43
11.	"End of the Light" (Part 1)	2:26
12.	"End of the Light" (Part 2)	3:18
13.	"I Don't Need Love"	2:19
14.	"Up All Night"	2:52
15.	"Open Up Your Door"	3:31
16.	"Feelin' Lost"	1:37
17.	"What a Way to Die"	1:50
18.	"Rock & Roll Music"	2:36

== Personnel ==
Adapted from Bill Kennedy's Showtime liner notes.

When People Were Shorter and Lived Near the Water

- Paul Defilipps – trombone, violin vocals
- David Licht – drums
- Robert Meetsma – cornet, guitar, vocals
- Kim Rancourt – vocals, keyboards
- David Raymer – guitar, vocals
- Dave Rick – bass guitar, guitar
- Chris Xefos – keyboards, vocals

Additional musicians

- Ned Hayden – guitar
- Richard Hell – vocals
- Alicia Svigals – violin

Production and additional personnel

- Greg Calbi – mastering
- Tom Cinoman – photography
- Kramer – production, mixing, bass guitar
- Cal Schenkel – design
- Steve Watson – engineering

== Release history ==
Region	Date	Label	Format	Catalog
United States	1993	Shimmy Disc	CD, LP	shimmy 064
