= Muddy Mississippi Line =

Single by Bobby Goldsboro

from the album Muddy Mississippi Line
- B-side: "Richer Man Than I"
- Released: July 18, 1969
- Recorded: June 24, 1969
- Studio: Monument (Nashville, Tennessee)
- Genre: Country, pop
- Label: United Artists
- Songwriter: Bobby Goldsboro
- Producers: Bob Montgomery; Bobby Goldsboro

Bobby Goldsboro singles chronology
"I'm a Drifter" (1969)	"Muddy Mississippi Line" (1969)	"Take a Little Good Will Home" (1969)

"Muddy Mississippi Line" is a single by American country pop artist Bobby Goldsboro. Recorded on June 24, 1969 and released on July 18, 1969, it was the first single from his album Muddy Mississippi Line released in January 1970.

The song peaked at number 15 on the Billboard Hot Country Singles chart. It also reached number 1 on the RPM Country Tracks chart in Canada.

== Chart performance ==
Chart (1969)	Peak position
U.S. Billboard Hot Country Singles	15
U.S. Billboard Hot 100	53
U.S. Billboard Easy Listening	10
Canadian RPM Country Tracks	1
Canadian RPM Top Singles	37
Canadian RPM Adult Contemporary	16
