= O. C. Smith =

American singer (1932–2001)

Background information
- Born: Ocie Lee Smith; June 21, 1932; Mansfield, Louisiana, U.S.
- Died: November 23, 2001 (aged 69) Los Angeles, California, U.S.
- Genres: R&B, jazz, soul
- Occupation: Singer
- Instrument: Vocals
- Years active: 1955–2001
- Labels: Cadence Records, MGM Records, Columbia Records, Rendezvous, Triune, Wave, Bluewater

Ocie Lee Smith (June 21, 1932 – November 23, 2001), known professionally as O. C. Smith, was an American singer. His recording of "Little Green Apples" went to number 2 on the Billboard Hot 100 in 1968 and sold over one million records.

== Biography ==
Born in Mansfield, Louisiana, United States, Smith moved with his parents to Little Rock, Arkansas, and then moved with his mother to Los Angeles, California, after his parents' divorce.

After completing a psychology degree at Southern University, Smith joined the Air Force, and served throughout the U.S., Europe and Asia. While in the Air Force, Smith began entering talent contests and toured with Horace Heidt. After his discharge in July 1955, Smith went into jazz music to pay the bills.

Smith gained his first break as a singer with Sy Oliver and made an appearance on Arthur Godfrey's Talent Scouts. His success on that show led to a 1955 recording contract with Cadence Records where his 1956 debut release "Slow Walk"/"Forbidden Fruit" and three further Cadence singles were not hits.

Smith was also in demand elsewhere as vocalist and under-billed on Art Mooney's January 1956 MGM cover version of the Little Richard hit "Tutti Frutti". The release was not a hit, but convinced MGM Records to sign Smith to a solo contract, resulting in three more releases, but still no hits.

In 1961, Smith was recruited by Count Basie to be his vocalist, a position he held until 1965. He also continued to record with different labels, but a hit remained elusive. By 1968, Smith's then label, Columbia Records, was ready to release him from his recording contract, when he entered the charts for the first time with "The Son of Hickory Holler's Tramp", which reached number 2 in the UK Singles Chart and also broke the Top 40 in the United States. In 1976, Kenny Rogers revived the hit as a country song, similar to the first versions of the song by Johnny Darrell.

Smith changed the first part of his name to O.C. and recorded the Bobby Russell-written song "Little Green Apples," which went to number 2 on the Hot 100 on 26 October 1968 and won Russell the 1969 Grammy Award for Song of the Year. It received a gold record from the R.I.A.A. for sales of one million records.

He continued to record, reaching the R&B, Adult Contemporary and pop charts in his home country with the likes of "Daddy's Little Man", "Friend, Lover, Woman, Wife", "Me and You" and "Love to Burn". He also returned to the UK Singles Chart in 1977 with "Together", reaching a Top 30 position.

After CBS, Smith united with Charles Wallert, who wrote and produced the title track as well as the album for "Dreams Come True" that returned Smith to the national charts. The Whatcha Gonna Do album, resulted in three nationally charted singles for a total of 40 weeks. This album contained "Brenda", "You're My First, My Last My Everything" and "Spark of Love". Additional hits "The Best Out of Me" and "After All is Said and Done" established Smith as a Beach Music star. Nominated for six awards at the third Beach Music Awards, Smith captured five.

Smith became pastor and founder of The City Of Angels Church in Los Angeles, California, where he ministered for 16 years. One of his last recordings, "Save the Last Dance for Me" reached the number one position on the Rhythm n' Beach Top 40 chart.

== Death ==
On November 23, 2001, Smith died of a heart attack in Los Angeles.

He was survived by his wife Robbie Gholson Smith, his four children with former wife Lorraine Smith: Sherryn Smith, Ocie Lee Smith III, Kelly T. Smith and Robert Francis Smith, sons Jesse Hayes IV and Frank Hayes, daughter Bonnie Dykes, and 10 grandchildren including Monique Smith, Sergio Glenn Smith and Melany Frances Smith.

Shortly after his death, Governor Jim Hodges proclaimed June 21, 2002, "O.C. Smith Day" in the state of South Carolina. Smith was posthumously elected to the Carolina Beach Music Hall of Fame in November 2002.

His book, Little Green Apples: God Really Did Make Them, that he co-wrote with James Shaw, was published posthumously in 2003.

== Discography ==
=== Singles ===
Year	Single	Peak chart positions					
Year	Single	US	US R&B	US AC	UK	CAN Country	AUS
1967	"That's Life"	127	-	-	-	-	-
1968	"The Son of Hickory Holler's Tramp"	40	32	-	2	4	3
1968	"Main Street Mission"	105	-	-	-	-	-
1968	"Little Green Apples"	2	2	4	-	-	35
1968	"Isn't It Lonely Together"	63	40	-	-	-	62
1969	"Honey (I Miss You)"	44	44	19	-	-	-
1969	"Friend, Lover, Woman, Wife"	47	25	17	-	-	25
1969	"Daddy's Little Man"	34	9	6	-	-	-
1969	"Me and You"	103	38	-	-	-	-
1970	"Moody"	114	-	38	-	-	-
1970	"Primrose Lane"	86	-	4	-	-	53
1970	"Baby, I Need Your Loving"	52	30	21	-	-	82
1971	"Help Me Make It Through the Night"	91	38	-	-	-	-
1972	"Don't Misunderstand"	102	-	-	-	-	-
1974	"La La Peace Song"	62	-	36	-	-	-
1976	"Together"	-	62	14	25	-	-
1978	"Love to Burn"	-	34	29	-	-	-
1982	"Love Changes"	-	68	-	-	-	-
1986	"What'cha Gonna Do"	-	53	-	-	-	-
1986	"You're the First, the Last, My Everything"	-	52	-	-	-	-
1987	"Brenda"	-	58	-	-	-	-

=== Albums ===
- 1966 The Dynamic O.C. Smith
- 1968 Hickory Holler Revisited
- 1969 O.C. Smith at Home
- 1969 For Once in My Life
- 1970 Greatest Hits
- 1971 Help Me Make It through the Night
- 1974 La La Peace Song
- 1977 Together
- 1979 Love Is Forever
- 1980 Dreams Come True
- 1982 Love Changes
- 1993 After All Is Said and Done
- 2000 I Give My Heart to You
- 2000 Beach Music Classics and Love Songs

== Filmography ==
- 2009 O.C. Smith: How Sweet It Is
