= Porgy (album) =

Studio album by When People Were Shorter and Lived Near the Water
- Released: 1991
- Studio: Noise New York (New York City)
- Genre: Experimental rock
- Length: 52:43
- Label: Shimmy Disc
- Producer: Kramer

When People Were Shorter and Lived Near the Water chronology
Bobby (1989)	Porgy (1991)	Bill Kennedy's Showtime (1993)

Porgy is the second studio album by the American band When People Were Shorter and Lived Near the Water, released in 1991 by Shimmy Disc. It contains covers of songs from Porgy and Bess.

== Critical reception ==
Trouser Press called the album "a well-informed piece of work, not simply a cheap parody." The New York Times wrote that the band "specializes in satire ... When People Were Shorter isn't smug; this group's love of bad taste seemed honest and heartfelt."

== Track listing ==
All lyrics are written by Ira Gershwin and DuBose Heyward; all music is composed by George Gershwin.

No.	Title	Length
1.	"Intro/Summertime"	4:18
2.	"Roll Dem Bones"	1:21
3.	"A Woman Is a Sometime Thing"	3:09
4.	"Happy Dust"	1:47
5.	"Gone, Gone, Gone"	2:05
6.	"My Man's Gone Now"	2:18
7.	"It Takes a Long Pull to Get There"	3:01
8.	"I Got Plenty o' Nuttin'"	1:34
9.	"I Hates Yo' Guts"	1:00
10.	"Buzzard Song"	2:32
11.	"Bess, You Is My Woman Now"	2:46
12.	"Oh, I Can't Sit Down"	1:13
13.	"Plenty (Reprise)"	0:39
14.	"I Ain't Got No Shame"	0:55
15.	"It Ain't Necessarily So"	2:05
16.	"The Rape"	2:14
17.	"Serena's Prayer"	3:49
18.	"Strawberry Woman"	0:34
19.	"Honey Man"	1:08
20.	"Crab Man"	0:35
21.	"I Loves You, Porgy"	2:15
22.	"Somebody Knockin' on de Door"	1:12
23.	"Red Headed Woman"	1:35
24.	"Summertime (Reprise)"	1:41
25.	"There's a Boat Dat's Leaving Soon for New York"	3:34
26.	"Oh, Lawd, I'm on My Way!"	3:23

== Personnel ==
Adapted from Bobby liner notes.

When People Were Shorter and Lived Near the Water

- David Licht – drums
- Robert Meetsma – guitar, banjo, fiddle, cornet, saxophone, tambourine, percussion, vocals
- Kim Rancourt – vocals, flute
- David Raymer – guitar, vocals
- Dave Rick – bass guitar

Additional musicians

- Paul Defilipps – vocals, trombone
- Frank London – trumpet
- Tom Varner – French horn

Production and additional personnel

- Kramer – production
- Paco Simon – cover art
- Chris Xefos – engineering

== Release history ==
Region	Date	Label	Format	Catalog
United States	1991	Shimmy Disc	CD, CS, LP	shimmy 044
