= I'm a Drifter =

1969 song performed by Bobby Goldsboro

Single by Bobby Goldsboro

from the album Today
- B-side: "Hoboes and Kings"
- Released: 1969
- Recorded: April 24, 1968 or February 14, 1969
- Studio: RCA Studio B (Nashville, Tennessee)
- Genre: Pop
- Length: 3:23
- Label: United Artists Records
- Songwriter: Bobby Goldsboro
- Producers: Bob Montgomery & Bobby Goldsboro

Bobby Goldsboro singles chronology
"Glad She's a Woman" (1969)	"I'm a Drifter" (1969)	"Muddy Mississippi Line" (1969)

"I'm a Drifter" is a song written and sung by Bobby Goldsboro, which he released in 1969. The song spent 10 weeks on the Billboard Hot 100 chart, peaking at No. 46, while reaching No. 14 on Billboard's Easy Listening chart, No. 22 of Billboard's Hot Country Singles chart, No. 44 on the Cash Box Top 100, No. 36 on Canada's RPM 100, and No. 9 on RPM's Adult Contemporary chart.

== Chart performance ==
Chart (1969)	Peak position
US Billboard Hot 100	46
US Billboard Easy Listening	14
US Billboard Hot Country Singles	22
US Cash Box Top 100	44
Canada - RPM 100	36
Canada - RPM Adult Contemporary	9
