= Autumn of My Life =

Single by Bobby Goldsboro

from the album Word Pictures
- B-side: "She Chased Me"
- Released: 1968
- Recorded: April 24, 1968
- Studio: RCA Studio B, Nashville, Tennessee
- Genre: Traditional pop
- Length: 3:36
- Label: United Artists
- Songwriter: Bobby Goldsboro
- Producers: Bob Montgomery; Bobby Goldsboro

Bobby Goldsboro singles chronology
| "Honey" (1968) | "Autumn of My Life" (1968) | "The Straight Life" (1968) |

"Autumn of My Life" is a song written and sung by Bobby Goldsboro, which was released in 1968. The song spent nine weeks on the Billboard Hot 100 chart, peaking at No. 19, while reaching No. 2 on Billboard's Easy Listening chart, No. 12 on Record World's "100 Top Pops", No. 1 on Record World's "Top Non-Rock" chart, No. 11 on Canada's RPM 100, No. 2 on RPM's Country Chart, and No. 18 on Australia's Go-Set National Top 40.

== Charts ==
| Chart (1968) | Peak position |
|---|---|
| Australia - Go-Set | 18 |
| Canada - RPM 100 | 11 |
| Canada - RPM Country Chart | 2 |
| UK - Record Retailer | 58 |
| US Billboard Hot 100 | 19 |
| US Billboard Easy Listening | 2 |
| US Billboard Hot Country Singles | 15 |
| US Cash Box Top 100 | 14 |
| US Record World 100 Top Pops | 12 |
| US Record World Top Non-Rock | 1 |
| US Record World Top C&W Singles | 9 |
