= When There's No You =

Single by Engelbert Humperdinck

from the album Sweetheart
- B-side: "Stranger Step Into My World (Romantico Blues)"
- Released: 1971
- Genre: Easy Listening; Pop
- Length: 2:57
- Label: Parrot Records
- Songwriter(s): Les Reed, Jackie Rae
- Producer(s): Gordon Mills

Engelbert Humperdinck singles chronology
"Sweetheart" (1970)	"When There's No You" (1971)	"Another Time, Another Place" (1971)

"When There's No You" is a song written by Les Reed and Jackie Rae and performed by Engelbert Humperdinck. The melody was adapted from the music of Ruggero Leoncavallo's opera Pagliacci. The single was Humperdinck's second of four number ones on the Easy Listening chart in the US, reaching number one in April 1971. On the Billboard Hot 100, "When There's No You" peaked at number forty-five.

== See also ==
- List of number-one adult contemporary singles of 1971 (U.S.)
