= Honey (Bobby Goldsboro album) =

Studio album by Bobby Goldsboro
- Released: 1968
- Studios: RCA Studio B, Nashville
- Genre: Country pop
- Label: United Artists
- Producers: Bob Montgomery, Jack Gold

Bobby Goldsboro chronology
Our Way of Life (1967)	Honey (1968)	Word Pictures (1968)

Honey is a studio album by American pop and country singer songwriter Bobby Goldsboro issued in March 1968 on the United Artists label.

== Chart performance ==
The album reached No. 1 on the US Billboard Country Albums chart and Record World Top Country Lp's, No. 5 on the US Billboard Pop charts and Cashbox Top 100 Albums chart, and No. 41 in the Canadian charts. It was also certified Gold by the RIAA.

The title track, "Honey", was his biggest hit in 1968, a tearjerker about the death of a man's young wife. The song, written by Bobby Russell, was recorded in one take. It became the largest-selling record in the world for 1968 and topped the Hot 100 for five weeks. A French-language version "Chérie" became a local hit in Canada.

== Track listing ==
=== Side one ===
1. "Honey" (Bobby Russell) – 3:58
2. "Run to Me" (Bobby Goldsboro) – 2:25
3. "With Pen in Hand” (Bobby Goldsboro) – 3:27
4. "Pardon Me Miss" (Bobby Goldsboro) – 2:40
5. "Why Don't You Believe Me" (Lew Douglas, King Laney, Ray Rodde) – 2:15

=== Side two ===
1. "Pledge of Love" (Bobby Goldsboro) – 2:21
2. "Little Green Apples" (Bobby Russell) – 2:25
3. "Love Arrestor" (Bobby Goldsboro) – 2:43
4. "By the Time I Get to Phoenix" (Jimmy Webb) – 2:44
5. "Beautiful People" (Kenny O'Dell) – 2:20
6. "A Woman" (Larry Butler, John Hurley) – 2:11

== Production ==
- All tracks produced by Bob Montgomery except Side B Track 1 by Jack Gold
- Side B, Track 1 arranged by Bill Justis
- Tracks A1, A3, A5, B2, B4, B5 & B6 arranged by Don Tweedy
- Tracks A2, A4 & B3 arranged by Ray Stevens

== Charts ==
Chart (1968)	Peak position
US Billboard Top LP's	5
US Billboard Hot Country Albums	1
US Record World Top Country LP's	1
US Record World 100 Top LP's	15
US Cashbox Top 100 Albums	5
Canada RPM Top Albums	41

== Certifications ==
Region	Certification	Certified units/sales
United States (RIAA)	Gold	500,000^{^}
^{^} Shipments figures based on certification alone.
