= With Pen in Hand =

1968 song written by Bobby Goldsboro

Single by Johnny Darrell

from the album With Pen in Hand
- B-side: "Poetry of Love"
- Released: 1968
- Recorded: 1968
- Genre: Country
- Length: 3:18
- Label: United Artists
- Songwriter: Bobby Goldsboro
- Producer: Bob Montgomery

Johnny Darrell singles chronology
"The Son of Hickory Holler's Tramp" (1967)	"With Pen in Hand" (1968)	"I Ain't Buying" (1968)

"With Pen in Hand" is a song written by Bobby Goldsboro and first released on his March 1968 album, Honey. The song's lyrics address the subjects of divorce and losing custody of one's child, and are sung from the perspective of the parent who expects to be losing custody of their child, as they make a final plea to their spouse to reconcile before the divorce is finalized. "With Pen in Hand" has been a hit for multiple artists in the late 1960s and 1970s.

== Johnny Darrell version ==
The first single release of "With Pen in Hand" was by Johnny Darrell on April 13, 1968. Darrell's version reached No. 3 on Billboard's Hot Country Singles chart, No. 2 on Record World's "Top C&W Singles", No. 4 on the Cash Box Country Top 50, No. 126 on Billboard's Bubbling Under the Hot 100 chart, and No. 12 on Cash Box's "Looking Ahead" chart of singles with potential of entering the Cash Box Top 100. He also released it on his August 1968 album also called With Pen in Hand.

== Billy Vera version ==
In June 1968, Billy Vera released a version of the song, which was his first solo single. Vera's version spent 6 weeks on the Billboard Hot 100, reaching No. 43, while reaching No. 25 on Billboard's Easy Listening chart, No. 25 on the Cash Box Top 100, No. 29 on Record World's "100 Top Pops", No. 21 on Record World's "Top Non-Rock" chart, No. 12 on Canada's RPM 100, and No. 20 on Record World's "Juke Box Top 25".

== Vikki Carr version ==
"With Pen in Hand"

Single by Vikki Carr

from the album For Once in My Life
- B-side: "Can't Take My Eyes Off You"
- Released: 1968 (UK); 1969 (US)
- Recorded: 1968
- Genre: Pop
- Length: 3:38 (UK); 3:55 (US)
- Label: Liberty
- Songwriter: Bobby Goldsboro
- Producers: Dave Pell & Ron Bledsoe

Vikki Carr, who has said: "I had to fight for 'With Pen in Hand'", had a 15 November 1968 UK single release with a cover of the song. Carr, herself in London at the time recording a TV show, promoted the single on British television and radio, facilitating its charting at No. 39 on the UK Singles Chart.

Also in November 1968, Carr played the Manhattan nightclub Persian Room, with her engagement being recorded as the live album For Once in My Life, from which her performance of "With Pen In Hand" was issued as a single in February 1969. It spent 13 weeks on the Billboard Hot 100, peaking at No. 35, becoming Carr's third and final Top 40 hit on that chart. It also reached No. 6 on Billboard's Easy Listening chart, and was ranked No. 5 on Billboard's year-end ranking of 1969's "Top Easy Listening Singles".

In Canada, Carr's live version reached No. 38 on the RPM 100, and No. 4 on RPM's Adult Contemporary chart.

The B-side of both the UK and US single versions of "With Pen in Hand" featured Carr's version of "Can't Take My Eyes Off You", from the album It Must Be Him.

In 1970, Carr was nominated for a Grammy Award for Best Female Pop Vocal Performance for her live rendition of "With Pen in Hand".

=== Chart performance ===
Chart (1969)	Peak position
Canada RPM 100	38
Canada RPM Adult Contemporary	4
UK Singles Chart	39
US Billboard Hot 100	35
US Billboard Easy Listening	6
US Cash Box Top 100	42
US Record World 100 Top Pops	34
US Record World Top Non-Rock	7

== Bobby Goldsboro version ==
Goldsboro first recorded the song February 26, 1968 and released the song on his March 1968 album, Honey, but he didn't release it as a single until August 1, 1972. Goldsboro's version spent 5 weeks on the 1972 Billboard Hot 100, reaching No. 94, while reaching No. 28 on Billboard's Easy Listening chart, No. 87 on the Cash Box Top 100, and No. 92 on Record World's "The Singles Chart".

== Other versions ==
In 1968, Jerry Vale released a version of the song as a single and on the album This Guy's in Love With You. Vale's version reached No. 30 on Billboard's Easy Listening chart and No. 23 on Record World's "Top Non-Rock" chart.

Roger Miller released the song on the album A Tender Look At Love in 1968.

Conway Twitty released the song on the album Next in Line in 1968.

Aretha Franklin released the song on the album Let Me in Your Life in 1974.

In 1977, Dorothy Moore released a version of the song as a single and on her eponymous album. Moore's version reached No. 12 on Billboard's Hot Soul Singles chart, No. 101 on Billboard's Bubbling Under the Hot 100 chart, No. 92 on Record World's "The Singles Chart", and No. 11 on Record World's "The R&B Singles Chart", No. 103 on Cash Box's "Looking Ahead" chart, and No. 15 on "Cash Box Top 100 R&B".
