= Hello, Summertime =

Single by Bobby Goldsboro

from the album Hello, Summertime
- B-side: "And Then There Was Gina"
- Released: 1974
- Recorded: 1974
- Genre: Adult contemporary
- Length: 2:23
- Label: United Artists
- Songwriter(s): Bill Backer, Billy Davis, Roger Cook, Roger Greenaway
- Producer(s): Bob Montgomery and Bobby Goldsboro

Bobby Goldsboro singles chronology
"Summer (The First Time)" (1973)	"Hello, Summertime" (1974)

"Hello, Summertime" is a song written by Bill Backer, Billy Davis, Roger Cook and Roger Greenaway. Recorded by American singer Bobby Goldsboro, his 1974 release peaked at No. 8 on the Billboard Adult Contemporary chart, and hit No. 14 in the United Kingdom in September 1974.
