= Georgy Porgy =

Georgy Porgy (/ˈpɔːrdʒi/) may refer to:

- "Georgie Porgie", the traditional nursery rhyme
- "Georgy Porgy" (song) by Toto featuring Cheryl Lynn
- Georgie Porgie (producer), George Andros, a music producer and recording artist
- "Georgy Porgy" (short story), a short story by Roald Dahl, collected in Kiss Kiss
