= Molly (Bobby Goldsboro song) =

Single by Bobby Goldsboro
- B-side: "Honey Baby"
- Released: 1962
- Genre: Traditional pop
- Length: 2:49
- Label: Laurie Records
- Songwriter: Steve Karliski
- Producer: Jack Gold

Bobby Goldsboro singles chronology
"You Better Go Home" (1962)	"Molly" (1962)	"The Runaround" (1963)

"Molly" is a song released in 1962 by Bobby Goldsboro.

"Molly" was Bobby Goldsboro's first hit single. The song spent 7 weeks on the Billboard Hot 100 chart, peaking at No. 70, while reaching No. 17 on Billboard's Middle-Road Singles chart, and No. 60 on the Cash Box Top 100.

== Background ==
The record producer Jack Gold gave the song written by Steve Karliski to Goldsboro to record. Although Goldsboro was dubious at the choice of song, he recorded the song. The song's lyrics tell the story of a man returning home to his wife and young child, after having lost his sight fighting in a war.

== Chart performance ==
Chart (1963)	Peak position
US Billboard Hot 100	70
US Adult Contemporary (Billboard)	17
US Cash Box Top 100	60
