= George Bragg =

American conductor (1926–2007)

George Washington Bragg (January 24, 1926 – May 31, 2007) was an American conductor and founder of the Texas Boys Choir. He won two Grammy Awards for Best Choral Performance in 1967 and 1969. Bragg led the choir for over 3000 performances, 18 tours, and numerous appearances on radio and television. He became a lifetime member of the Recording Academy.

== Early life ==
George Bragg was born on January 24, 1926, in Meridian, Mississippi, to George W. Bragg, Sr. and Elizabeth Hairston Bragg. In 1934 he moved to Birmingham, Alabama, where he joined the Apollo Boys' Choir.

== Career ==
On 7 February 1946, Bragg, then a freshman at North Texas State College, founded the Denton Civic Boys Choir. The choir moved to Fort Worth, Texas in 1957 and was renamed the Texas Boys Choir. That same year, the choir appeared on the "Pat Boone Show."

In 1959, Bragg, Stephen Seleny, and James Walker founded the Texas Boys Choir School, which three years later was renamed the Trinity Valley School. Under Bragg's direction, the choir grew in prominence. In 1961, the choir made its Town Hall debut in New York City. On the morning of 22 November 1963, the choir sang at Hotel Texas in Fort Worth for John F. Kennedy and Jacqueline Kennedy, several hours before JFK's assassination. In the 1960s, the choir appeared on the "Perry Como Show" and "The Ed Sullivan Show."

After conducting the choir on a recording of his "Persephone," the famous composer Igor Stravinsky called the choir "the greatest boy choir in the world." Bragg received his first Grammy Award in 1967 from the National Academy of Recording Arts and Sciences for Best Choral Performance on "Charles Ives: Music for Chorus." The following year, he received his second Grammy Award for "The Glory of Gabrieli," which was recorded in St. Mark's Basilica in Venice, Italy. During Bragg's tenure, the choir gave over 3,000 performances, including 13 domestic and five European concert tours. They also performed on radio and television as well as with opera companies and symphony orchestras. Under his direction, the choir recorded 26 albums. Mr. Bragg left the choir in 1975 to share his expertise with other boy choirs throughout the United States.

In 1994, Bragg was diagnosed with Parkinson's disease. He suffered a stroke in 1996 and died a decade later on May 31, 2007.

== Memberships and affiliations ==
- Phi Mu Alpha Sinfonia

1. Alpha Alpha, 1969 (National Honorary Chapter)
2. Gamma Theta, 1946 (University of North Texas College of Music Chapter)

- National Academy of Recording Arts and Sciences (Lifetime Member)
