= It's Too Late (Bobby Goldsboro song) =

Single by Bobby Goldsboro

from the album It's Too Late
- B-side: "I'm Goin' Home"
- Released: January 7, 1966
- Recorded: October 15, 1965
- Studio: Columbia (Nashville, Tennessee)
- Genre: Pop
- Length: 2:15
- Label: United Artists Records
- Songwriter: Bobby Goldsboro
- Producer: Jack Gold

Bobby Goldsboro singles chronology
"Broomstick Cowboy" (1965)	"It's Too Late" (1966)	"I Know You Better Than That" (1966)

"It's Too Late" was a record for Bobby Goldsboro. It was released in 1965 and became a hit the following year in both the United States and Canadian charts.

== Background ==
It was written and sung by Bobby Goldsboro, which he recorded on October 15, 1965, and released on January 7, 1966. Ray Stevens contributes the harmony vocals in the chorus. The song spent 8 weeks on the Billboard Hot 100 chart, peaking at No. 23, while reaching No. 5 on Canada's RPM 100.

It has since achieved a level of popularity on the Northern Soul scene.

== Chart performance ==
Chart (1966)	Peak position
Canada - RPM 100	5
US Billboard Hot 100	23
Canada - CHUM Hit Parade	15

== Cover versions ==
- A version was recorded by The Mariachi Brass feat. Chet Baker that was released in 1966.
- Venezuelan rock band Los Darts covered the song which was released as " Ahora es tarde" in 1967.
- Johnny Rivers covered the song on his album Whisky A Go-Go Revisited (1967).
- Shaun Cassidy covered "It's Too Late" on his 1977 debut LP, Shaun Cassidy.
