= Johnny Darrell =

American country singer-songwriter (1940–1997)

Background information
- Born: July 23, 1940; Hopewell, Alabama, U.S.
- Died: October 7, 1997 (aged 57) Kennesaw, Georgia, U.S.
- Genre: Country
- Occupation: Singer-songwriter
- Instruments: Guitar, vocals
- Years active: 1960s–1997
- Label: United Artists; Capricorn

Johnny Darrell (July 23, 1940 – October 7, 1997) was an American country music artist.

Darrell was born in Hopewell, Alabama, but grew up in Marietta, Georgia. After a stint in the army, he moved to Nashville and began managing a Holiday Inn near Music Row, when he was discovered by Kelso Herston, a producer working for United Artists, on the recommendation of Bobby Bare. In his recording career, Darrell established a trend of introducing "lyrically adventurous" songs that later became major hits for other artists.

His debut single, the first recording of the Curly Putman-penned "Green, Green Grass of Home" (later made famous by Porter Wagoner and Tom Jones), was issued in 1965, followed by "As Long as the Wind Blows" in 1966, which made the country top 30 and saw Darrell being named "Most Promising Male Artist" by Cashbox. He was the first to record the Mel Tillis song "Ruby, Don't Take Your Love to Town", which became a top-10 hit for him in 1967 and later a hit for Kenny Rogers. This was followed by his performance of Dallas Frazier's "The Son of Hickory Holler's Tramp" in 1968, and the crossover hit "With Pen in Hand", which later became a hit for Vikki Carr. In the 1970s, Darrell was associated with the outlaw country movement. Darrell was married to his wife Jody. He suffered from diabetes, a disease that impaired his health and ability to perform. Darrell died from the disease at age 57 in Kennesaw, Georgia.

== Discography ==
=== Albums ===
Year	Album	Chart Positions		Label
Year	Album	US Country	US 200	Label
1966	As Long as the Winds Blow	—	—	United Artists
1967	Ruby, Don't Take Your Love to Town	37	—	United Artists
1968	The Son of Hickory Holler's Tramp	37	—	United Artists
1968	With Pen in Hand	23	—	United Artists
1969	Why You Been Gone So Long	33	172	United Artists
1970	California Stop Over	—	—	United Artists
1970	The Best of Johnny Darrell	—	—	United Artists
1975	Water Glass Full of Whiskey	—	—	Capricorn
2000	Singin' It Lonesome: The Very Best...1965–1970	—	—	Raven
2002	The Complete Gusto/Starday/King Recordings	—	—	King

=== Singles ===
Year	Single	Chart Positions			Album
Year	Single	US Country	US Pop	CAN Country	Album
1965	"Green Green Grass of Home"	—	—	—	As Long as the Winds Blow
1965	"As Long as the Wind Blows"	30	—	—	As Long as the Winds Blow
1966	"Johnny Lose It All"	44	—	—	As Long as the Winds Blow
1966	"She's Mighty Gone"	72	—	—	Ruby, Don't Take Your Love to Town
1967	"Ruby, Don't Take Your Love to Town"	9	—	—	Ruby, Don't Take Your Love to Town
1967	"My Elusive Dreams"	73	—	—	The Son of Hickory Holler's Tramp
1967	"Come See What's Left of Your Man"	37	—	—	Ruby, Don't Take Your Love to Town
1967	"The Son of Hickory Holler's Tramp"	22	—	—	The Son of Hickory Holler's Tramp
1968	"With Pen in Hand"	3	126	—	With Pen in Hand
1968	"I Ain't Buying"	27	—	—	Why You Been Gone So Long!
1968	"Woman Without Love"	20	—	—	Why You Been Gone So Long!
1969	"The Coming of the Roads" (with Anita Carter)	50	—	—	single only
1969	"Why You Been Gone So Long!"	17	—	—	Why You Been Gone So Long!
1969	"River Bottom"	23	—	12	Why You Been Gone So Long!
1969	"Trouble Maker"	—	—	—	single only
1970	"Mama Come'n Get Your Baby Boy"	68	—	—	California Stop Over
1970	"Brother River"	75	—	—	California Stop Over
1970	"They'll Never Take Her Love from Me"	74	—	—	singles only
1971	"Look Out Cleveland"	—	—	—	singles only
1971	"Don't It Seem to Rain a Lot"	—	—	—	singles only
1973	"Crazy Daddy!"	—	—	—	singles only
1973	"Dakota the Dancing Bear"	66	—	—	singles only
1974	"Orange Blossom Special"	63	—	—	Water Glass Full of Whiskey
1975	"Glendale Arizona"	—	—	—	Water Glass Full of Whiskey
1975	"Rose Colored Gin"	—	—	—	Water Glass Full of Whiskey
