= Watching Scotty Grow =

Single by Bobby Goldsboro

from the album We Gotta Start Lovin' (retitled Watching Scotty Grow)
- B-side: "Water Color Days"
- Released: October 22, 1970
- Recorded: April 10, 1970
- Studio: Woodland (Nashville, Tennessee)
- Genre: Pop, country
- Length: 2:34
- Label: United Artists 50727
- Songwriter: Mac Davis
- Producers: Bob Montgomery; Bobby Goldsboro

Bobby Goldsboro singles chronology
"It's Gonna Change" (1970)	"Watching Scotty Grow" (1970)	"And I Love You So" (1971)

"Watching Scotty Grow" is a song written by country music singer-songwriter Mac Davis and recorded by Bobby Goldsboro in 1970 on his album, We Gotta Start Lovin. Davis recorded his version on his 1971 album, I Believe in Music.

This song deals with a father witnessing the activities of his son growing up, while the father does his usual laid back adult activities. The phrase, "that's my boy" is used in all 3 verses. One of the verses, "Mickey Mouse says it's thirteen o'clock," refers to the Mickey Mouse watches which were popular at the time. (In the 24-hour clock, 1300 is 1:00 p.m., but the song's reference is to the boy's inability to tell time due to his young age.)

== History ==
Goldsboro had many pop music hit singles in the mid to late 1960s, including his chart-topping song, "Honey", in 1968. By the early 1970s, he had begun to achieve success on the country chart as well. According to Goldsboro, he met music producer Jerry Fuller one day in Los Angeles, and Fuller encouraged him to meet one of his associates in the music business, Mac Davis. When the two met, one of Davis' songs that stood out to Goldsboro was "Watching Scotty Grow". Goldsboro decided to record the song, but an executive with United Artists Records questioned the potential of releasing it as a single, stating that "I just don't think anyone will buy a record about a father and a son." Goldsboro wanted to substitute the name of his own son, Danny, but Davis did not agree.

== Reception ==
After the release of Goldsboro's album We Gotta Start Lovin' in late 1970, "Watching Scotty Grow" began to receive attention from radio stations in the United States. Goldsboro stated: "They put it out and within two weeks, it was being played like a single." The record label quickly issued a 45rpm, and the song began ascending American record charts during the Christmas shopping season. It reached the top of the Billboard Easy Listening chart on January 9, 1971, where it remained for six weeks. It also peaked at #11 on the Billboard Hot 100 in February of that year and climbed to the top ten on the Billboard country music chart as well. The track was Goldsboro's tenth top 40 hit on the U.S. pop chart and his 13th in the top 40 of the Canadian RPM Magazine Top Singles charts.

The b-side, "Water Color Days", reached #93 on the Canadian charts.

== Charts ==
Chart (1970–71)	Peak position
Australian "Go-Set" National Top 60	51
Canadian RPM Top Singles	5
Canadian RPM Adult Contemporary Tracks	1
Canadian RPM Country Tracks	7
U.S. Billboard Hot 100	11
U.S. Billboard Easy Listening	1
U.S. Billboard Hot Country Singles	7
U.S. Cash Box Top 100	8

== See also ==
- List of number-one adult contemporary singles of 1971 (U.S.)
