= Texas Boys Choir =

US choir

- Choir
- Origin: Denton, Texas
- Founded: 1946
- Artistic Director: Dr. Todd Prickett
- Awards: 2 Grammy Awards (1966, 1968), 3 George Washington Honor Medals, Bronze Award from the International Film and Television Festival of New York, Gold & Championship Medals in 2004 World Choir Games
- Website: https://www.artsacademics.org/choirs/texas-boys-choir

The Texas Boys Choir is a mixed-voice choir located in Fort Worth, Texas. Since its founding in 1946 by George Bragg, the Texas Boys Choir has grown from a mere twenty-six voices to a choral program consisting of close to eighty members.

== Awards and honors ==
The Texas Boys Choir has received many awards and honors since its founding. The TBC has won 2 Grammy Awards, in 1966 and again in 1968. In 1966 the TBC won with Ives: Music for Chorus in the category of "Best Classical Choral Performance (Other than Opera)". In 1968, the TBC won again with The Glory of Gabrieli in the category of "Best Choral Performance (Other than Opera)". The TBC has also been awarded three George Washington Honor Awards from the Freedoms Foundation and a Bronze Award from the International Film and Television Festival of New York. In 2004, the TBC participated in the World Choir Games in Bremen, Germany receiving a gold medal and Championship medal in the category of Mixed Boys' Choir under the artistic direction of Dr. Jerome M. Bierschenk. More recently, the TBC was invited to participate in the third annual Iguazu en Concierto: International Youth Orchestra and Choir Festival 2012 as the only representative of the United States, as well as, North America. This invitation culminated in a 12-day international tour to Argentina. The TBC performed in Buenos Aires, Mercedes, Mar de Plata, and Iguazu Falls, Argentina. In both Buenos Aires and Mercedes, the TBC performed with the internationally acclaimed Argentinian quartet Opus Cuatro. In 2013, the TBC was invited to perform at the biennial National American Choral Directors Association Convention in Dallas, Texas.

== History ==
George Bragg founded the choir as the Denton Civic Boys Choir School in 1946 with 37 boys. The tuition for students including room, board, instruction, voice and piano lessons was $1,200 per year. The choir changed its name to the Texas Boys Choir in 1957 to better represent its broad draw of membership from around Texas. In September 1957 the choir moved to Fort Worth, where the majority of its members were from. By 1958 the choir had traveled more than 50,000 miles through 25 states and Mexico. On the morning of Nov. 22, 1963, the choir sang at the Hotel Texas in Fort Worth for President and Mrs. John F. Kennedy, several hours before his assassination.
