= The Son of Hickory Holler's Tramp =

1968 American Top 40 song

Single by O. C. Smith

from the album Hickory Holler Revisited
- B-side: "The Best Man"
- Released: January 9, 1968
- Genre: Soul
- Length: 3:50
- Label: Columbia
- Songwriter: Dallas Frazier
- Producer: Jerry Fuller

"The Son of Hickory Holler's Tramp" is a song written by Dallas Frazier and first recorded by country musician Johnny Darrell in 1968.

The song tells the story of a woman with 14 children who is abandoned by her worthless alcoholic husband and turns to prostitution to support her large family.

== Recordings ==
It was a hit for O. C. Smith, who recorded it at FAME Studios in Muscle Shoals in 1968. His single spent 15 weeks in the UK singles chart between June and August 1968, including three weeks at No 2. In the US, the single spent 14 weeks on the Billboard Hot 100, peaking at number 40, while peaking at number 32 during its 9 weeks on the Billboard Hot R&B chart. On the New Zealand Listener charts, it reached number 16.

Previous releases were by Sanford Clark and by Johnny Darrell, who made it in the Billboard Country Charts to number. 37. Merle Haggard released a version of this song on his 1968 album Sing Me Back Home. In 1977, the song became much better known in the US because it was included on Kenny Rogers' second solo album Kenny Rogers, which topped the U.S. Billboard magazine's Hot Country Songs chart, and a version by country singer Johnny Russell made it to number 32 on the chart the same year.
