= Honey (Bobby Goldsboro song) =

1968 single by Bobby Goldsboro

Single by Bobby Goldsboro

from the album Honey
- B-side: "Danny"
- Released: February 17, 1968
- Recorded: January 30, 1968
- Studio: RCA Studio B, Nashville
- Genre: Country pop
- Length: 3:55
- Label: United Artists
- Songwriter: Bobby Russell
- Producer: Bob Montgomery

Bobby Goldsboro singles chronology
"Pledge of Love" (1967)	"Honey" (1968)	"Autumn of My Life" (1968)

"Honey", also known as "Honey (I Miss You)", is a song written by Bobby Russell. He originally produced it with former Kingston Trio member Bob Shane, who was the first to release the song. It was then given to American singer Bobby Goldsboro, who recorded it for his 1968 album of the same name, originally titled Pledge of Love. Goldsboro's version was a hit, reaching No. 1 in several countries.

In the song, the narrator mourns his absent wife, and the song begins with him looking at a tree in their garden, remembering how "it was just a twig" on the day she planted it. Only in the third verse is it finally revealed that "one day...the angels came," and that his wife had died. The chorus was used in Evangeline by Stephen Sanchez.

== Composition and recordings ==
"Honey" was written by Bobby Russell, who took inspiration from a tree in his front yard when he noticed how big it had become since he had planted it. From this came the first line of the song, "See the tree, how big it's grown ...". His song was first recorded by Bob Shane of The Kingston Trio, produced by Russell himself.

Before Shane's recording was released, Goldsboro was recommended the song by Larry Henley of the Newbeats. However, Goldsboro thought the recording by Shane was over-produced and the lyrics overpowered by the production. Goldsboro at that time was in need of songs to record, he and his producer Bob Montgomery invited Russell over to play a few of his songs, which included "Honey". After listening to Russell's simpler rendition accompanied by just a guitar, Goldsboro became interested and asked if he could cover the song. Russell was initially reluctant as Shane's version was due to be released, but eventually agreed that Goldsboro could record it as long as his single did not compete with Shane's record. They agreed to delay the release of Goldsboro's recording by four weeks.

The song was recorded on January 30, 1968, with an arrangement by Don Tweedy. Goldsboro later attributed the success of the song to Tweedy's arrangement, and believed that Shane could have the same success with Tweedy's arrangement. According to Goldsboro, the recording session for the song went so well, the first take was completely satisfactory; it was decided to record another take just to see if it could be improved upon and it came out just as well, so the first take was released as the single.

== Release ==
Goldsboro's recording of "Honey" was released as a single in the U.S. in February 1968. While Shane's recording reached only 104 on the Bubbling Under chart, Goldsboro's version became successful very quickly, and reached the top of the chart in April. It spent five weeks at No. 1 on the Billboard Hot 100 singles chart (the 200th song to reach No. 1 on that chart), from April 7 to May 11, and three weeks atop Billboard's Hot Country Singles chart. It was preceded on the Billboard Hot 100 by "(Sittin' on) the Dock of the Bay" by Otis Redding and was followed by Archie Bell & the Drells' "Tighten Up". It was Goldsboro's only No. 1 hit on the Pop Singles and Country Singles charts and it was his first song to top the Adult Contemporary chart. Billboard ranked the record as the No. 3 song for 1968.

"Honey" reached No. 2 on the UK Singles Chart on its initial release in 1968, and a re-release of the single in the United Kingdom in 1975 also reached No. 2. In Australia, it spent four weeks at No. 1 on the ARIA Charts, replacing the Beatles' "Lady Madonna", and was the No. 6 song of 1968.

== Reception ==
"Honey" was immediately and immensely popular. It sold a million copies in its first three weeks, the fastest-selling record in the history of United Artists. It was certified gold on April 4, 1968, the same day that Martin Luther King Jr. was assassinated, an event that may have helped the sales of the single. It was the best-selling record worldwide for 1968, even more popular than "Hey Jude". It was a crossover hit, topping both the pop and country singles charts, one of only three songs to do so in the 1960s.

The recording was nominated for two Grammy Awards in 1968: Record of the Year and Best Contemporary-Pop Vocal Performance, Male. It was awarded Song of the Year in 1968 by the Country Music Association.

Despite its popularity, the song was often dismissed or disparaged from the beginning. It has been called "innocuous pop", "classy schlock", more "dreadful" than Pavarotti, and, hyperbolically, the "Worst Song of All Time" on 21 April 2006 by music critic Todd Leopold of CNN whose ambivalent antipathy left him "transfixed" by "one of the biggest songs of the year."

== Other versions ==
In 1968, Oscar Santana, an Ibersound recording artist had success with his version, making it to no. 1 on Latin American Single Hit Parade charts.

Margaret Lewis released an answer version titled "Honey (I Miss You Too)", which reached No. 74 on the country chart in 1968. A jazz instrumental version was recorded by The Distant Galaxy as a medley with the "Elvira Madigan theme", and it reached No. 39 on the AC chart the same year. In 1969, O. C. Smith's version of the song reached No. 44 on the pop chart, while Orion recorded a version that reached No. 89 on the country chart in 1979.

== Charts ==
=== Weekly charts ===
Bobby Goldsboro

Chart (1968)	Peak position
Australian Go-Set National Top 40	1
Austria (Ö3 Austria Top 40)	9
Belgium (Ultratop 50 Wallonia)	18
Belgium (Ultratop 50 Flanders)	5
Canada Country Singles (RPM)	1
Canada Top Singles (RPM)	1
Italy (Musica e Dischi)	20
Ireland (IRMA)	1
Netherlands (Single Top 100)	5
New Zealand (Listener)	1
Norway (VG-lista)	4
UK Singles (Official Charts)	2
US Hot Country Songs (Billboard)	1
US Billboard Hot 100	1
US Adult Contemporary (Billboard)	1
West Germany (GfK)	8

=== Year-end charts ===
Chart (1968)	Rank
Australia	6
Canada	2
UK	26
US Billboard Hot 100	3

Chart (1975)	Rank
UK	36

Peter Lotis

Chart (1968)	Peak position
South Africa (Springbok)	9

Distant Galaxy (medley)

Chart (1969)	Peak position
US Adult Contemporary (Billboard)	39

O.C. Smith

Chart (1969)	Peak position
Canada Top Singles (RPM)	62
Canada Adult Contemporary (RPM)	40
US Billboard Hot 100	44
US Adult Contemporary (Billboard)	19
US R&B (Billboard)	44
US Cash Box Top 100	64

== See also ==
- List of Billboard Hot 100 number-one singles of 1968
