= Bobby Goldsboro =

American singer-songwriter, guitarist, painter, and television producer (born 1941)

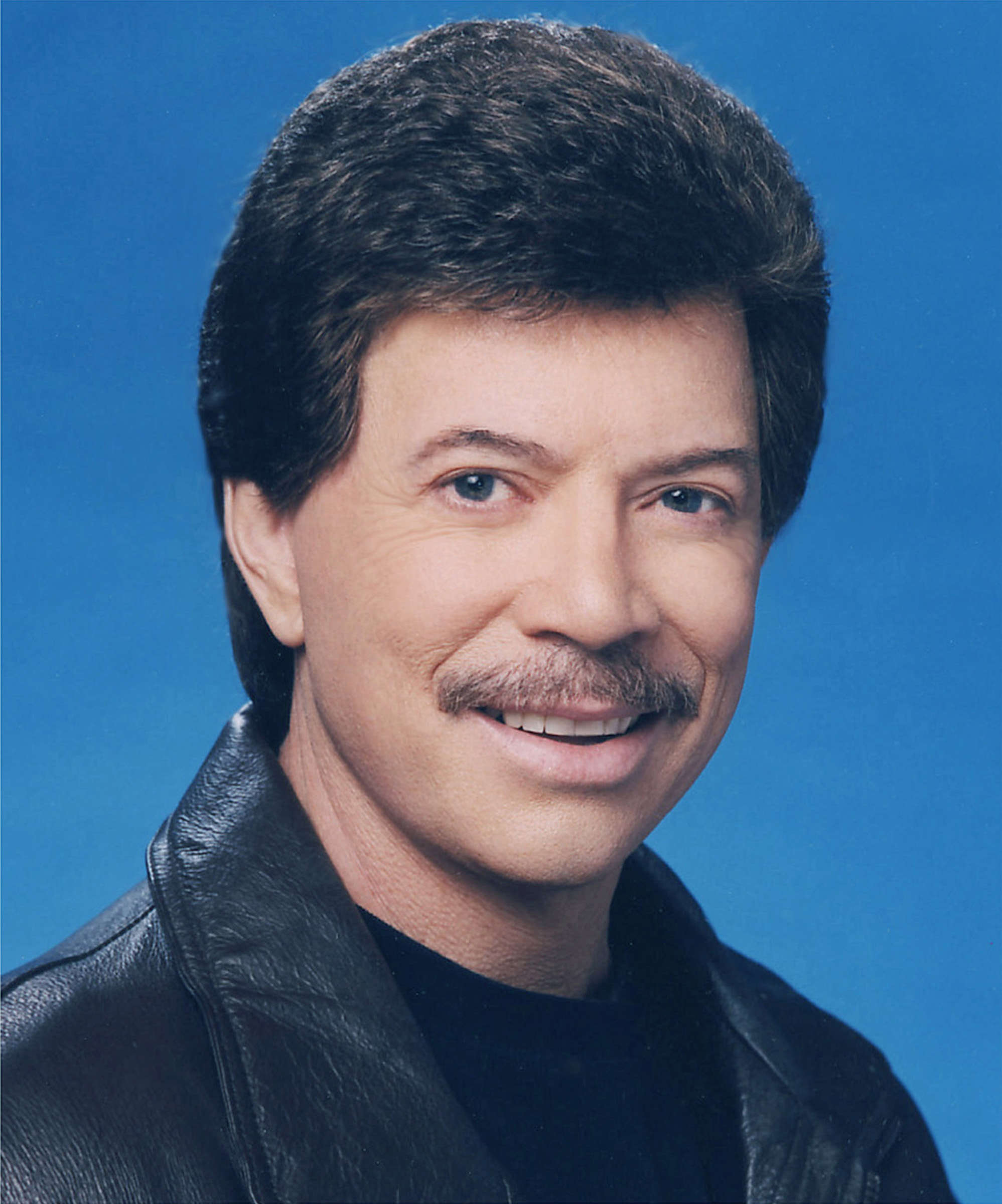

Background information
- Born: Robert Charles Goldsboro; January 18, 1941 (age 85); Marianna, Florida, United States
- Genres: Country, adult contemporary, pop
- Occupations: Singer-songwriter; guitarist; painter; television producer
- Instruments: Vocals, guitar
- Years active: 1962–present
- Labels: United Artists, Curb
- Website: bobbygoldsboro.com

Robert Charles Goldsboro (born January 18, 1941) is an American pop and country singer and songwriter. He had a string of pop and country hits in the 1960s and 1970s, including his signature No. 1 hit "Honey", which sold over 1 million copies in the United States, and the UK top-10 single "Summer (The First Time)".

Goldsboro starred in his own television show, The Bobby Goldsboro Show, from 1973 to 1976. He also created several animated specials and children's books, as well as the PBS children's series The Swamp Critters of Lost Lagoon.

== Early life ==
Goldsboro was born in Marianna, Florida. During his first year of life, his family moved 35 miles (56 km) north from Marianna to Dothan, Alabama. He learned to play the ukulele when he was around 12 years old before learning to play the guitar. He was interested in becoming a professional baseball player before turning his interest to music.

Goldsboro attended Dothan High School. After graduating in 1959, he enrolled at Auburn University, majoring in business administration. Goldsboro left college after his second year to pursue a musical career, playing guitar in the backup band for Roy Orbison.

== Music career ==
=== The Webbs ===
In high school Goldsboro joined Spider and The Webbs which featured Amos "Mugsby" on bass, Dave Robinson on drums, "Flying Fingers" John Rainey on lead guitar, and "Rockin'" Steve Murphree on rhythm guitar. Goldsboro performed semi-professionally as part of The Webbs while at college. At the end of his second year in college, the band's manager, Buddy Buie, arranged for the Webbs to play for Roy Orbison, who was without a backing band in a show he had organized. This arrangement worked well, and The Webbs then became the permanent backing band for Orbison, performing with him for two-and-a-half years until 1964, touring with Orbison in the US and Europe.

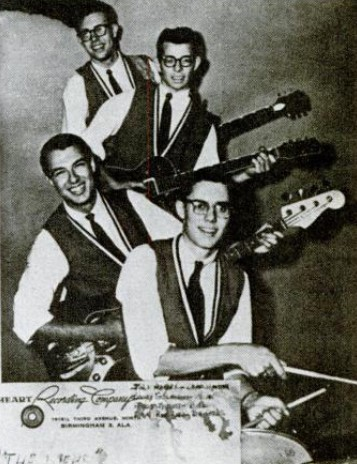
The Webs in 1959

When they were not touring with Orbison, The Webbs played local gigs, recorded songs written by Goldsboro, and achieved some local success. They came to the attention of independent producer Jack Gold, who was interested in working with Goldsboro. He gave Goldsboro a song titled "Molly" for him to record, and the song managed to chart on Billboard Hot 100 in early 1963.

=== Solo success ===
Goldsboro continued performing with The Webbs and Orbison until his solo career kicked off with the top 10 hit "See the Funny Little Clown". The single, written by Goldsboro, reached No. 9 on the U.S. national charts in early 1964. It sold over 1 million copies and was awarded a gold disc. In the next few years, he achieved a few Top 40 hits, including "Little Things", "Voodoo Woman", and "It's Too Late". However, his attempt at more serious songs was derailed when "Broomstick Cowboy", a protest song, was banned from ABC's American Bandstand. Although Goldsboro was not a prolific performer of soul music, "Too Many People" and "It's Too Late" were huge hits on the Northern soul scene in Great Britain and were played extensively.

In 1968, Goldsboro released the biggest hit of his career, "Honey", a tearjerker about the death of a man's wife. The song, written by Bobby Russell, was recorded in one take. It became the largest-selling record in the world for 1968 and topped the Hot 100 for five weeks, reached number two in the UK Singles Chart in 1968 and 1975, and was a number one single in Australia. It also became his first country hit.

One of Goldsboro's compositions, "With Pen in Hand", was recorded by several artists, including a Grammy-nominated pop version by Vikki Carr that reached the Hot 100's top 40 in 1969; Johnny Darrell had taken the song to No. 3 on the U.S. country chart a year earlier. In 1970, Della Reese included a cover on her album Black Is Beautiful. Goldsboro's "The Cowboy and the Lady" became a top 10 country hit as "The Cowgirl and the Dandy" for Brenda Lee in 1980; Dolly Parton covered it in 1977, and John Denver had a hit with the song in 1981.

Goldsboro also wrote "When Your Love Has Gone."

Goldsboro reached No. 11 on Billboard's national charts with the Mac Davis-penned song "Watching Scotty Grow". "Summer (The First Time)", a 1973 reminiscence about a 17-year-old boy's first sexual experience (with a 31-year-old woman), was a Top 25 hit in the U.S. and reached number 9 in the UK. Using a repeating piano riff, 12-string guitar, and an orchestral string arrangement, the song was suggestive enough to spark some controversy. The follow-up "Hello Summertime" was written by Roger Cook and Roger Greenaway and hit No. 14 in the UK in September 1974.

In his career, Goldsboro had 11 Top 40 hits on the Billboard Hot 100 and 12 on the country chart.

== Television ==
The success of "Honey" led to numerous television appearances for Goldsboro, and he became a regular on The Mike Douglas Show, co-hosting the show a few times. Goldsboro was approached to host his own syndicated half-hour television series The Bobby Goldsboro Show. The show, which ran from 1973 to 1976, was one of the more successful syndicated shows at that time.

In the 1990s, he composed the music for the sitcom Evening Shade. In 1995, he created the children's television series The Swamp Critters of Lost Lagoon. Goldsboro voiced all the characters, wrote all the scripts, and played all the musical instruments in the show.

He also created several animated specials and children's books with Peeler-Rose Productions: Snuffy: The Elf Who Saved Christmas, Easter Egg Mornin', Stinger: King of the Bee's, Boy Who Became a Frog, A Cat Named Bob, and Lumpkin the Pumpkin.

== Personal life ==
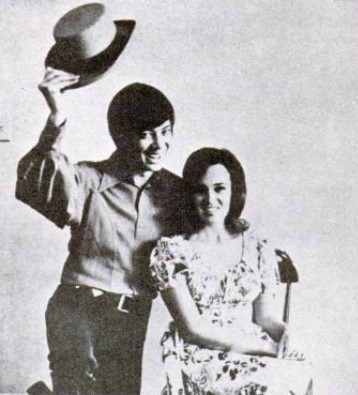
Goldsboro with his first wife Mary Alice Watson in 1974

Goldsboro was married to Mary Alice Watson, whom he met while he was in college; they had three children. They divorced in 1982 after a bitter court case in which Goldsboro's daughter made accusations against him that he rejected as false. He married Dianne J. Roberts in 1985. Goldsboro is an oil painter.

== Discography ==
- Honey (1968)

=== Books ===
- Reynolds, Robert (2018). The Music of Bobby Goldsboro. Lightning Source UK. ISBN 978-0-359-23571-1.

== Bibliography ==
- Allmusic
- Wood, Gerry (1998). "Bobby Goldsboro". In The Encyclopedia of Country Music. Paul Kingsbury, Editor. New York: Oxford University Press. p. 205.
