= Cake discography =

- Studio albums: 6
- Extended plays: 6
- Live albums: 1
- Compilation albums: 1
- Singles: 19
- Demo albums: 1

The following is the complete discography of American band Cake.

== Albums ==
=== Studio albums ===
List of studio albums, with selected chart positions and certifications
Title	Album details	Peak chart positions										Certifications
Title	Album details	US	AUS	CAN	FRA	GER	NLD	NOR	NZL	SWI	UK	Certifications
Motorcade of Generosity	Released: February 7, 1994; Re-issued: June 9, 2008; Label: Capricorn (942035) / Upbeat (2); Format: CD, CS, DI, LP	—	—	—	—	—	—	—	—	—	—	
Fashion Nugget	Released: September 17, 1996; Label: Capricorn (532867); Format: CD, CS, DI, LP	36	9	64	20	49	71	28	41	—	53	RIAA: 2× Platinum; ARIA: Gold; MC: Gold
Prolonging the Magic	Released: October 6, 1998; Label: Capricorn (538092); Format: CD, CS, DI, LP	33	28	64	15	84	—	—	—	—	—	RIAA: Platinum
Comfort Eagle	Released: July 24, 2001; Label: Columbia Records (5015402); Format: CD, CS, DI, LP	13	27	7	41	—	—	—	—	31	—	RIAA: Platinum; MC: Gold
Pressure Chief	Released: October 5, 2004; Label: Columbia Records (5174502); Format: CD, DI, LP	17	99	25	79	95	—	—	—	44	—	
Showroom of Compassion	Released: January 11, 2011; Label: Upbeat (99332); Format: CD, DI, LP, 7" vinyl box set	1	—	15	—	—	—	—	—	—	—	
"—" denotes a recording that did not chart or was not released in that territory.

=== Compilation albums ===
List of compilation albums
Title	Album details	Peak chart positions
Title	Album details	US Indie
B-Sides and Rarities	Released: October 2, 2007; Label: Upbeat (9958); Format: CD	38

=== Live albums ===
List of live albums
Title	Album details
Live from the Crystal Palace	Released: April 19, 2014; Label: Upbeat; Format: LP

=== Demo albums ===
List of demo albums
Title	Album details
Is This Love?	Released: 1991; Format: CS

== Extended plays ==
List of extended plays
Title	EP details
Extra Value	Released: 2004; Label: Columbia (CSK 54799); Format: CD
Wheels	Released: 2005; Label: Sony; Format: DI

== Singles ==
List of singles, with selected chart positions, showing year released as single and album name
Title	Year	Peak chart positions										Certifications	Album
Title	Year	US	US Alt	AUS	CAN	FRA	GER	NLD	NZL	SCO	UK	Certifications	Album
"Rock 'n' Roll Lifestyle"	1993	—	31	—	—	—	—	—	—	—	—		Motorcade of Generosity
"Jolene"	1995	—	—	—	—	—	—	—	—	—	—		Motorcade of Generosity
"Ruby Sees All"	1995	—	—	—	—	—	—	—	—	—	—		Motorcade of Generosity
"The Distance"	1996	— (Note: "The Distance" did not enter the Billboard Hot 100, but peaked at number 35 on the Hot 100 Airplay chart.)	4	21	—	—	—	73	—	20	22	RIAA: 2× Platinum	Fashion Nugget
"I Will Survive"	1997	—	28	27	—	37	95	—	27	22	29	RIAA: Gold	Fashion Nugget
"Frank Sinatra"	1997	—	— (Note: "Frank Sinatra" did not enter the Billboard Alternative Songs chart, but peaked at number 49 on the Radio and Records Alternative chart.)	—	—	—	—	—	—	—	—		Fashion Nugget
"Friend Is a Four Letter Word"	1998	—	—	—	—	—	—	—	—	—	—		Fashion Nugget
"Never There"	1998	78	1	75	42	—	—	—	—	—	66	RIAA: Gold	Prolonging the Magic
"Sheep Go to Heaven"	1999	—	16	—	—	—	—	—	—	—	—		Prolonging the Magic
"Let Me Go"	1999	—	28	—	—	—	—	—	—	—	—		Prolonging the Magic
"You Turn the Screws"	1999	—	— (Note: "You Turn The Screws" did not enter the Billboard Alternative Songs chart, but peaked at number 41 on the Radio and Records Alternative chart.)	—	—	—	—	—	—	—	—		Prolonging the Magic
"Short Skirt/Long Jacket"	2001	— (Note: "Short Skirt/Long Jacket" did not enter the Billboard Hot 100 but peaked at number 19 on the Bubbling Under Hot 100 Singles chart, which acts as an extension to the Hot 100.)	7	44	43	—	—	87	—	74	63	RIAA: Platinum	Comfort Eagle
"Arco Arena"	2001	—	—	—	—	—	—	—	—	—	—		Comfort Eagle
"Love You Madly"	2001	—	— (Note: "Love You Madly" did not enter the Billboard Alternative Songs chart, but peaked at number 40 on the Radio and Records Alternative chart.)	—	—	—	—	—	—	—	—		Comfort Eagle
"No Phone"	2004	—	13	—	—	—	—	—	—	—	—		Pressure Chief
"Carbon Monoxide"	2004	—	—	—	—	—	—	—	—	—	—		Pressure Chief
"Sick of You"	2010	— (Note: "Sick of You" did not enter the Billboard Hot 100 but peaked at number 8 on the Bubbling Under Hot 100 Singles chart, which acts as an extension to the Hot 100.)	4	—	72	—	—	—	—	—	—		Showroom of Compassion
"Long Time"	2011	—	15	—	—	—	—	—	—	—	—		Showroom of Compassion
"Mustache Man (Wasted)"	2011	—	22	—	—	—	—	—	—	—	—		Showroom of Compassion
"Sheep Go to Heaven" (live)	2013	—	—	—	—	—	—	—	—	—	—		Live from the Crystal Palace
"Sinking Ship"	2018	—	—	—	—	—	—	—	—	—	—		Non-album singles
"Age of Aquarius"	2019	—	—	—	—	—	—	—	—	—	—		Non-album singles
"—" denotes a recording that did not chart or was not released in that territory.

== Other charting songs ==
Title	Year	Peak chart positions	Album
Title	Year	CAN Rock	Album
"War Pigs"	2007	18	B-Sides and Rarities

== Covers ==
Song	Written by	Recorded by	Album	Year
"Sad Songs & Waltzes"	Willie Nelson	Willie Nelson	Fashion Nugget	1996
"I Will Survive"	Freddie Perren, Dino Fekaris	Gloria Gaynor	Fashion Nugget	1996
"Perhaps, Perhaps, Perhaps"	Osvaldo Farrés, Joe Davis	Osvaldo Farrés	Fashion Nugget	1996
"Half as Much"	Curley Williams	Hank Williams	"Never There" B-side	1998
"Mahna Mahna"	Piero Umiliani	The Muppets	For the Kids	2002
"The Guitar Man"	David Gates	Bread	Pressure Chief	2004
"Strangers in the Night"	Bert Kaempfert, Charles Singleton, Eddie Snyder	Frank Sinatra	Stubbs the Zombie: The Soundtrack	2005
"War Pigs"	Tony Iommi, Ozzy Osbourne, Geezer Butler, Bill Ward	Black Sabbath	B-Sides and Rarities	2007
"Never, Never Gonna Give You Up"	Barry White	Barry White	B-Sides and Rarities	2007
"Ruby, Don't Take Your Love to Town"	Mel Tillis	Kenny Rogers	B-Sides and Rarities	2007
"Excuse Me (I Think I've Got a Heartache)"	Buck Owens, Harlan Howard	Buck Owens	B-Sides and Rarities	2007
"What's Now Is Now"	Bob Gaudio, Jake Holmes	Frank Sinatra	Showroom of Compassion	2011
"Reincarnation"	Roger Miller	Roger Miller	King of the Road: A Tribute to Roger Miller	2018
