= Live from the Crystal Palace =

Live album by Cake
- Released: April 19, 2014
- Recorded: October 12–13, 2005
- Genre: Alternative rock
- Length: 39:00
- Label: Upbeat
- Producer: Cake

Cake chronology
Showroom of Compassion (2011)	Live from the Crystal Palace (2014)

Live from the Crystal Palace is the first, and to date only, live album from the Sacramento, California-based band Cake. The album was recorded over a two-night performance at Buck Owens' Crystal Palace in 2005. The album was originally expected to be released in 2006, but a release did not materialize until its release as part of the 8-LP box set released for Record Store Day on April 19, 2014.

== History ==
In a 2001 interview, John McCrea discussed his admiration for the Crystal Palace venue: "I like to play live, but I don't like touring for extended periods of time. We'd prefer to do what Buck Owens does: he has this place called the Crystal Palace in Bakersfield, and everybody comes to visit him, and he plays every Friday and Saturday night. That's our goal, but for now we have to travel."

Live from the Crystal Palace was announced on Cake's website several months before the band's B-Sides and Rarities (2007) album was announced. One track from Crystal Palace, "Mexico", was made available as a free download to members of Cake's mailing list in August 2006. Then, on November 2, 2006, the band announced that Crystal Palace would be delayed until 2007 "due to Cake's strict quality control enforcement."

B-Sides and Rarities was released on October 2, 2007, and Crystal Palace was mentioned very little until a late 2008 interview with Vince DiFiore, who stated that the album was mixed and ready to be released. The band, however, realized that releasing a live album would be like a "bookend to a music career" and had, at the time, no immediate plans to release it. DiFiore concluded, "Maybe some day we will release that, but a live album, especially for us, is not the same as the real live performance."

A 7-inch single containing "Sheep Go to Heaven" and "Jesus Wrote A Blank Check", both recorded at the Crystal Palace, was released for Record Store Day 2013. Following this release, an 8-LP box set was announced to be released on Black Friday 2013, which would have included the live album. But a month before, the box set was pushed back to Record Store Day 2014. Due to the high demand, a limited number of the box set, as well as individual copies of the LP were made available for purchase on the band's official store.

== Track list ==
All tracks are written by John McCrea, except where noted.

Side one
No.	Title	Writer(s)	Length
1.	"Sheep Go to Heaven"		5:33
2.	"Mexico"		3:12
3.	"Love You Madly"		3:55
4.	"Stickshifts & Safetybelts"		2:11
5.	"I Will Survive"	Freddie Perren, Dino Fekaris	5:25

Side two
No.	Title	Writer(s)	Length
1.	"Is This Love?"	John McCrea, Greg Brown	5:05
2.	"Excuse Me, I Think I've Got A Heartache"	Buck Owens, Harlan Howard	2:17
3.	"Daria"		4:02
4.	"Wheels"	John McCrea, Carlos Forster	4:16
5.	"Never There"		2:52
