= B-Sides and Rarities (Cake album) =

Compilation album by Cake
- Released: October 2, 2007
- Genre: Alternative rock, college rock, alternative country
- Length: 35:01 (Standard), 40:21 (Limited Edition)
- Label: Upbeat Records

Cake chronology
Pressure Chief (2004)	B-Sides and Rarities (2007)	Showroom of Compassion (2011)

Professional ratings
Review scores
Source	Rating
AllMusic	2/5 stars
IGN	(8.9/10)
PopMatters	6/10 stars
Prefix Magazine	5/10 stars

B-Sides and Rarities (originally referred to as just Rarities on the band's website) is a rarities compilation album by Cake, an alternative rock band from Sacramento, California. It features several cover songs from the 2004 bonus disc Extra Value and the 2005 Wheels EP, including Black Sabbath's "War Pigs" and Barry White's "Never, Never Gonna Give You Up."

Originally, Columbia Records requested the band to release a greatest hits compilation, but the band promptly refused. During the legal fall-out, Cake formed its own record label, Upbeat Records, and released B-Sides and Rarities

A limited-edition version of the album features a bonus track, a live version of "War Pigs" featuring Steven Drozd of The Flaming Lips. It also features a scratch and sniff cover with "five different CD cover/scent variations (including red/fresh cut roses, brown/leather, green/fresh cut grass, purple/grape, and yellow/banana)."

== Track listing ==
B-Sides and Rarities track listing
No.	Title	Length
1.	"War Pigs" (Black Sabbath cover)	3:54
2.	"Ruby, Don't Take Your Love to Town" (Johnny Darrell cover)	2:55
3.	"Mahna, Mahna" (Piero Umiliani cover, made popular by the Muppets)	2:54
4.	"Excuse Me (I Think I've Got a Heartache)" (Buck Owens cover)	2:21
5.	"Conroy"	3:01
6.	"Strangers in the Night" (Frank Sinatra cover, recorded for Stubbs the Zombie in Rebel Without a Pulse)	2:51
7.	"Subtract One Love (Multiply the Heartaches)" (George Jones cover)	2:47
8.	"Never, Never Gonna Give You Up" (Barry White cover)	3:50
9.	"Thrills" (The Chakachas cover; original title being "Stories")	2:58
10.	"Short Skirt/Long Jacket (Live at Triple M)"	3:16
11.	"It's Coming Down (Live at Pure FM)"	4:12

Limited Edition
No.	Title	Length
12.	"War Pigs (Live)" (featuring Steven Drozd)	5:20

iTunes bonus track
No.	Title	Length
13.	"Is This Love? (Live)"	4:30

== Personnel ==
Cake

- Vince DiFiore – trumpet, keyboard, harmony vocals
- John McCrea – acoustic guitar, lead vocals
- Xan McCurdy – electric guitar, background vocals
- Gabe Nelson – bass guitar, keyboard, background vocals

Guest musicians

- Paulo Baldi – drums on tracks 4, 10, 11
- Greg Brown – guitar, organ on tracks 7, 8, 9
- Victor Damiani – bass on tracks 7, 8, 9
- Pete McNeal – drums on tracks 1, 2, 3
- Tyler Pope – keyboards, guitar on track 5
- Todd Roper – drums on tracks 7, 8, 9

Technical personnel

- produced, arranged, & mixed by Cake
- additional mixing by Patrick Olguin
- mastered by Patrick Olguin at Velvet Tone South, Sacramento, CA
- design by Aesthetic Apparatus
- CAKE management by Tommy Manzi (for the Umbrella Group) and Lori Turncrantz (for Silent Tribunal LLC)

== Appearances in other media ==
- Cake's cover of "Mahna Mahna" appears on the charity CD For the Kids whose proceeds benefit the "VH1 SAVE THE MUSIC" organization.
- "Never, Never Gonna Give You Up" features in the movie An American Werewolf in Paris.
- Cake's cover of "Strangers in the Night" appears on the PC video game soundtrack Stubbs the Zombie in "Rebel Without a Pulse"
- "Conroy" appears in an episode of CSI: Crime Scene Investigation entitled "The Lost Girls".
