= Gabe Nelson =

American musical artist (born 1967)

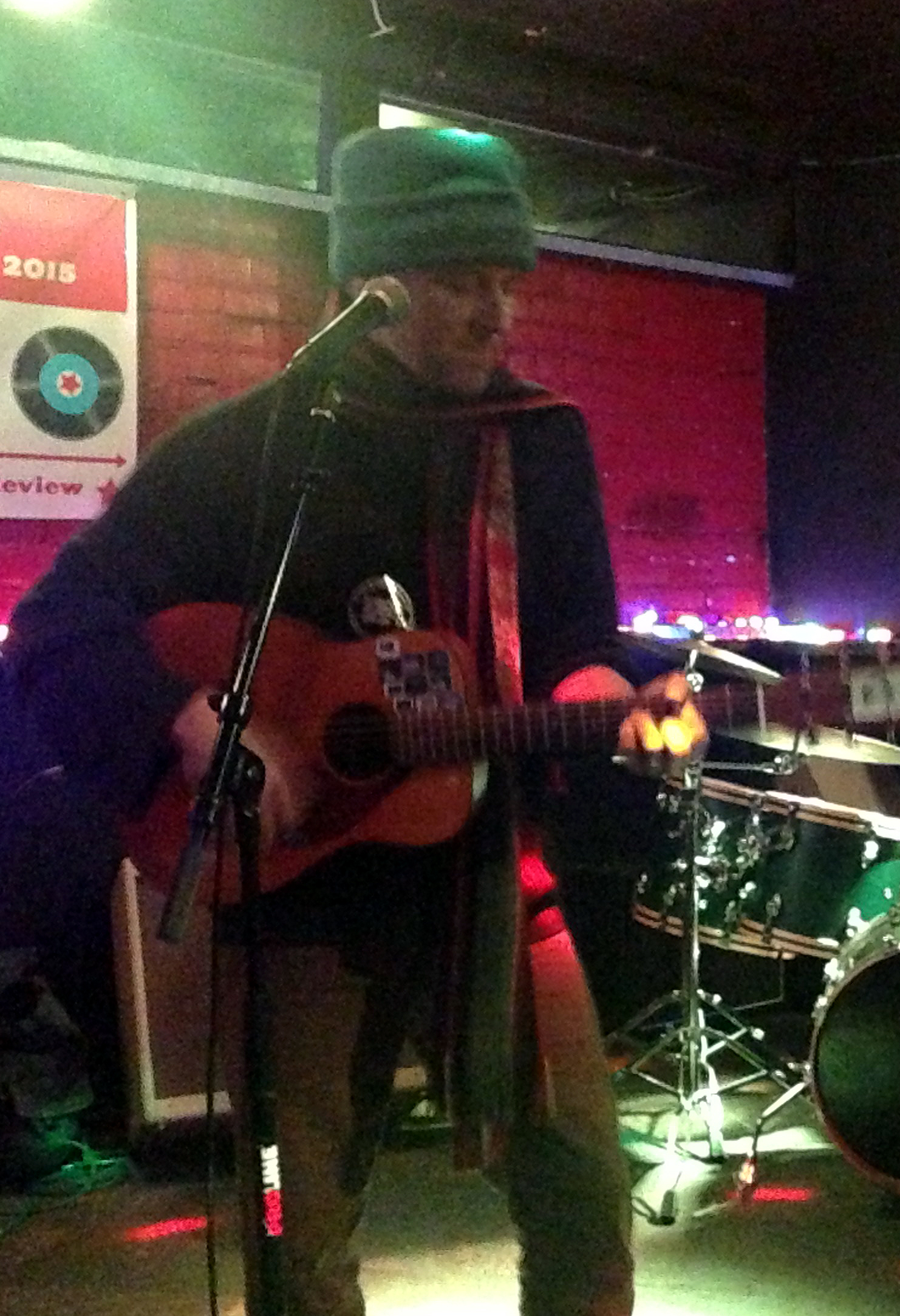
- Nelson performing in 2015

Background information
- Born: Christopher Gabriel Nelson; 2 March 1967 (age 59)
- Origin: Sacramento, California
- Genres: Alternative rock
- Instruments: Bass, guitar
- Years active: 1991–present
- Member of: Bellygunner
- Formerly of: Cake; The Mother Hips

Christopher Gabriel Nelson is an American rock musician from Sacramento, California, best known as the former bassist of the alternative rock band CAKE. Nelson replaced the original bassist, Shon Meckfessel, soon after the band was formed but left the band himself before the release of their first album, Motorcade of Generosity, which lists Victor Damiani as bassist. After the release of CAKE's second album, Fashion Nugget, Damiani left and Nelson re-joined. After playing bass and helping co-write songs on CAKE's subsequent studio albums, Nelson left the band again in late 2015.

Nelson is lead vocalist and songwriter for the group Bellygunner along with his wife Peggy Lanza and musicians Thomas Monson, Steve Randall and Shawn Hale. In addition to performing with artists such as Greg Loiacono and the band The Mother Hips, Nelson offers private music lessons to students in the Sacramento area.

== Selected discography ==
- Prolonging the Magic, 1998
- Comfort Eagle, 2001
- Pressure Chief, 2004
- Showroom of Compassion, 2011
