= A Piece of Cake (EP) =

EP by Cake
- Released: 1996
- Genre: Alternative
- Length: 20:43
- Label: Capricorn
- Producer: Cake

Cake chronology
Tour Nuggets (1995)	A Piece of Cake (1996)	Fashion Nugget (1996)

A Piece of Cake is an EP released by the alternative rock band Cake in 1996. The EP/Sampler was released as a teaser to the then-upcoming album Fashion Nugget. For an unknown reason, "The Distance" is listed and pressed twice into the CD; once at the beginning, and once at the end.

== Track listing ==
1. "The Distance" – 3:00
2. "Friend Is a Four Letter Word" – 3:17
3. "Daria" 3:44
4. "Open Book" – 3:44
5. "Frank Sinatra" – 3:58
6. "The Distance" – 3:00
