= Laurent Mercier =

French artist, producer and director

- Born: Laurent Didier Mercier; 30 March 1967 (age 58); France
- Occupations: Artist; Director; Producer; Publisher; Teacher
- Website: www.callicore-insubordinate.com www.studiomercier.com

Laurent Didier Mercier (born 30 March 1967) is a French artist, producer and director. He spent several years as an independent multimedia artist, organizing collective exhibitions, and analyzing the condition and status of artists in society. He worked with the publishing firm, Association for the Development of Multimedia Literature. He heads a production studio and 3D school in Paris.

== Early life ==
Laurent Mercier was born in France in 1967. He spent part of his childhood on the roads with his parents who worked in the music industry. Later he studied at the Ecole nationale supérieure des Beaux-arts in Paris. His teachers were Pierre Buraglio, Christian Boltansky, Annette Messager, Abraham Hadad, and Michel Salsman.

== Career ==
His artistic approach is characterized by the wild displaying of his artwork. He exhibited regularly at the Galerie Donguy, rue de la Roquette in Paris. This gallery represented the Fluxus movement (John Cage, La Monte Young, Yoko Ono, Joseph Beuys) and Body art. After Michel Journiac's passing, he continued the collective "Image pour vivre" and organized several exhibitions at Galerie Donguy. Mercier and Jacques Donguy developed many events on the subject of the artist's condition and status in society. They became the subject of protests on radio, university and in UNESCO congress. He joined Jeans François Bory and Donguy in publishing 'Association for the Development of Multimedia Literature', an international magazine for Europe, US, Brazil and Japan that releases poetry anthologies and documents, reissues rare discs and vocal music. Mercier performed with Donguy at the Centre National Georges Pompidou in Paris. At the same time he taught Visual Arts at the Jail Maison Central de Poissy.

Mercier created "Studio Mercier" to train computer graphics artists working in international production studios. He created his own production studio Callicore as a resistance act against "the cultural dictatorship of media".

They won a Webby Award with John Lee Hooker Jr. for the animated music video "Blues ain't nothin' but a Pimp" and enlarged Callicore's skills with music publishing.

Artists co-produced by Mercier include Iggy Pop, Johnny Winter, John Lee Hooker Jr, Arrested Development, Carbon Silicon, The Buzzcocks, The Meteors, The Washington Dead Cats, Marky Ramone, We Are the Fury, CAKE, Brian Setzer, Lee Rocker and Popa Chubby.
