= Never There (Cake song) =

1998 single by Cake

Single by Cake

from the album Prolonging the Magic
- B-side: "I Will Survive"
- Released: September 27, 1998
- Studio: Pus Cavern, Paradise (Sacramento, California); Hyde St., Coast Recorders (San Francisco, California)
- Genre: Alternative rock
- Length: 2:44
- Label: Capricorn
- Songwriter: John McCrea
- Producer: John McCrea

Cake singles chronology
"I Will Survive" (1997)	"Never There" (1998)	"Sheep Go to Heaven" (1999)

Music video
- "Never There" on YouTube

"Never There" is the first single released from American alternative rock band Cake's third studio album, Prolonging the Magic (1998). The song was commercially successful, topping the US Billboard Modern Rock Tracks chart and appearing on the music charts of four other countries. In Australia, the song was ranked at number 30 on the Triple J Hottest 100 countdown for 1998.

== Content ==
According to Cake vocalist John McCrea, the lyrics of "Never There" are sung from the viewpoint of a boy who is frustrated that his girlfriend never answers his phone calls. The boyfriend believes he will not make it through life without her, but in reality, he needs to focus on his own concerns instead. McCrea has described "Never There" as "a country song in disguise".

== Chart performance ==
The song spent three weeks at number one on the US Billboard Modern Rock Tracks chart, surpassing "The Distance" (which peaked at number four) as the band's highest-charting single. "Never There" was the band's first song to chart on the Billboard Hot 100 at number 78. In Iceland, the song was a top-10 hit, peaking at number nine in November 1998. The song also charted in Australia, Canada, and the United Kingdom, reaching numbers 75, 42, and 66, respectively.

== Music video ==
The music video for "Never There", directed by McCrea, features Cake performing in a western-style bar, while a story arc covers a trucker calling his girlfriend on a pay phone and she never answers as she is too busy partying with male body builders in speedos. It was filmed in Sacramento, California.

== Track listings ==
US and European CD single

1. "Never There" (LP version) – 2:44
2. "Cool Blue Reason" (LP version) – 3:27

UK 7-inch single

A. "Never There" – 2:44
B. "I Will Survive" – 5:11

UK CD1

1. "Never There" (LP version)
2. "Cool Blue Reason" (LP version)
3. "Is This Love?" (live)
4. "Never There" (video)

UK CD2

1. "Never There" (LP version) – 2:44
2. "The Distance" (LP version) – 3:01
3. "You Part the Waters" (live) – 2:50
4. "The Distance" (video) – 3:04

Australian CD single

1. "Never There" (LP version) – 2:44
2. "Cool Blue Reason" (LP version) – 3:27
3. "Half as Much" – 2:54

== Credits and personnel ==
Credits are lifted from the European CD single and Prolonging the Magic liner notes.

Studios

- Recorded at Pus Cavern, Paradise Studios (Sacramento, California), Hyde St. Studios, and Coast Recorders (San Francisco, California)
- Mastered at Precision Mastering (Los Angeles)

Cake

- John McCrea – writing, vocals, acoustic guitar, production
- Vincent Di Fiore – trumpet, background vocals
- Todd Roper – drums, background vocals
- Gabriel Nelson – bass guitar
- Rusty Miller – electric guitar

Other personnel

- Tyler Pope – electric guitar
- Kirt Shearer – mixing
- Craig Long – mixing
- Don C. Tyler – mastering

== Charts ==
=== Weekly charts ===
Chart (1998–1999)	Peak position
Australia (ARIA)	75
Canada Top Singles (RPM)	42
Canada Rock/Alternative (RPM)	10
Iceland (Íslenski Listinn Topp 40)	9
UK Singles (Official Charts)	66
US Billboard Hot 100	78
US Adult Pop Airplay (Billboard)	29
US Alternative Airplay (Billboard)	1
US Mainstream Rock (Billboard)	40

=== Year-end charts ===
Chart (1998)	Position
US Modern Rock Tracks (Billboard)	48

Chart (1999)	Position
US Adult Top 40 (Billboard)	64
US Modern Rock Tracks (Billboard)	7

== Certifications ==
Region	Certification	Certified units/sales
United States (RIAA)	Gold	500,000^{‡}
^{‡} Sales+streaming figures based on certification alone.

== Release history ==
Region	Date	Format(s)	Label(s)	Ref.
Australia	September 27, 1998	CD	Capricorn	
United States	October 20, 1998	Contemporary hit radio	Capricorn	
United Kingdom	April 19, 1999	7-inch vinyl; CD	Capricorn; Mercury	
