= Callicore (studio) =

French animation studio

- Industry: CGI animation
- Founded: 2000
- Founder: Laurent Mercier
- Headquarters: Paris, France
- Key people: Laurent Mercier (producer, director, CG artist), Anaelle Mercier (production assistant)
- Website: callicore.com

Callicore is a Paris-based studio which specializes in CGI animated music videos. Created by Laurent Mercier in 2000, the studio has produced videos for artists such as John Lee Hooker, Jr., The Buzzcocks, Cake, Marky Ramone, Carbon/Silicon and Arrested Development. The studio was named a 2009 Webby Award honoree for its work on Hooker's video Blues Ain't Nothin' But a Pimp.

Xavier Semen joined Callicore as a producer and lead animator in 2006. While the studio works primarily in animation, it also engages in music publishing. Semen left the studio in 2014. He has been replaced by Marius Legrand, a CG artist who is now lead animator and a producer at Callicore Studio.

Anaelle Mercier joined Callicore as a producer and production assistant in 2015.

Cedric Bernard joined Callicore as lead animator, after that Marius Legrand left the studio in 2019.

== History and style ==
Born in 1967, Laurent Mercier attended the École nationale supérieure des Beaux-Arts, and spent several years as an independent multimedia artist, organizing collective exhibitions, and analyzing the condition and status of artists in society. He also worked with the publishing firm, Association for the Development of Multimedia Literature.

Irritated by what he perceived as the "stranglehold" of major media companies on the music industry and other creative industries, Mercier launched Callicore as a "resistance act" against the "cultural dictatorship of the media" by these large-scale companies. Callicore controls all aspects of its projects, from pre-production to post-production, and retains a relatively independent and free nature.

One of the first collaborations between Mercier and Xavier Semens, who joined Callicore in 2006, was the animated video for Phantom Rider, a song from the 2007 album, Hymn for the Hellbound, by the British psychobilly group The Meteors. That same year, Callicore produced an animated video for Sound of a Gun, by the British punk band The Buzzcocks (the initial video was considered too violent for broadcast television, and a second, less violent version was released).

Callicore created the animated video for Blues Ain't Nothin' But a Pimp, a song from John Lee Hooker, Jr.'s Grammy Award-winning album, All Odds Against Me. The video portrays Hooker as a comic book character, "Bluesman", who plays in clubs at night and cleans up the streets during the day. The video was a Webby Award honoree in the Special FX/Motion Graphics category in 2009. An image from the video was featured on the album's cover.

In 2008, Callicore produced its first video for Carbon/Silicon, a band founded by Mick Jones, the former guitarist for The Clash, and bass player Tony James. In 2010, the studio produced the video for hip-hop group Arrested Development's Bloody, as well as for When We Were Angels by Marky Ramone's Blitzkrieg, a project of former Ramones drummer, Marky Ramone.

In 2011, Callicore created the video for Cake's Long Time, a track from the band's comeback album, Showroom of Compassion. In an interview with Cake singer John McCrea, Mercier said the gloomy mood of the video, which follows the plight of a man and his monkey imprisoned in a dystopian world, was inspired directly by Cake's music, which reminds him of "melancholy things." McCrea was impressed by the video's general movement and choreography, which he suggested are often lacking in music videos, and appreciated how Mercier perceived the non-humorous side of Cake's music.

Callicore produced and directed videos for artists such as Brian Setzer, Lee Rocker, Eagle-Eye Cherry and Dr. Feelgood, from 2011 to 2013. The studio has continued its collaboration with John Lee Hooker, Jr., with several videos featuring the "Bluesman" character created for Blues Ain't Nothin' But a Pimp.

== Music videography ==
Year	Title	Artist
2007	Sound of a Gun	The Buzzcocks
2007	Phantom Rider	The Meteors
2008	I'm a Dead Cat	Washington Dead Cats
2008	The News	Carbon/Silicon
2008	Mick Jones and Tony James on G-Rock Radio	Carbon/Silicon
2008	Blues Ain't Nothin' But a Pimp	John Lee Hooker, Jr.
2009	Stressed Out	John Lee Hooker, Jr.
2009	People Want a Change	John Lee Hooker, Jr.
2009	Vixen	Pete & Charlie
2009	What's Up Doc?	Carbon/Silicon
2010	Venus	We Are the Fury
2010	Extramarital Affair	John Lee Hooker, Jr.
2010	It's a Shame	John Lee Hooker, Jr.
2010	Bloody	Arrested Development
2010	When We Were Angels	Marky Ramone's Blitzkrieg
2010	Never Stop the Hate Train	The Meteors
2011	Long Time	Cake
2011	Go-Go Godzilla	Brian Setzer
2012	Dear John	John Lee Hooker, Jr.
2012	He Wants It	Clinic Rodeo
2012	Rockabilly Boogie	Lee Rocker
2013	Go Simmer Down	Eagle-Eye Cherry
2013	Who Do You Love?	Dr. Feelgood
2014	Wild Child	Lee Rocker
2014	Gooooooo!	Blues Power Band
2015	The Story of Reverend John Lee Hooker Jr	John Lee Hooker Jr
2015	Lottery	Marky Ramone
2016	I Want My Beer	Marky Ramone
2016	La Vie en Rose	Iggy Pop
2016	The Catfish	Popa Chubby
2017	That's Alright Mama/Blue Moon	Lee Rocker
2017	Don't Blame Me	Marky Ramone
2018	Illustrated Man	Johnny Winter
2018	Chaos Is My Life	The Exploited
2018	P*rn* Sl*t	The Exploited
2019	Cold Hearted Mama	Paul Nelson

== Video Game ==
Year	Title	Artist
2019	Marky Ramone The Game	Marky Ramone
