= Showroom of Compassion =

Studio album by Cake
- Released: January 11, 2011
- Recorded: 2009–2010
- Studios: Upbeat Studio, Sacramento, California
- Genres: Experimental rock, alternative rock, classical, avant-garde
- Length: 40:24
- Label: Upbeat
- Producer: Cake

Cake chronology
B-Sides and Rarities (2007)	Showroom of Compassion (2011)	Live from the Crystal Palace (2014)

Singles from Showroom of Compassion
- 1. "Sick of You" Released: September 2010; 2. "Long Time" Released: March 1, 2011

Showroom of Compassion is the sixth studio album from the band Cake, released on January 11, 2011. Produced by the band, it was the band's first studio album to be independently released. The musical style of Showroom of Compassion is grounded in the band's unique style of alternative rock, combining droll, often esoteric lyrics rife with word play and syncopation, catchy distorted guitar riffs, complex bass patterns, Moog and prominent use of trumpet. Cake's former lead guitarist, Greg Brown, makes a guest appearance on the song "Bound Away", his first appearance on a Cake album since 1996's Fashion Nugget.

The album was the band's first since the release of Pressure Chief in 2004, the longest gap to date between two consecutive Cake studio albums. It debuted at number one on the Billboard 200 for one week, becoming the band's first album to do so. The album's first single, "Sick of You", reached No. 13 on the Billboard Rock Songs chart.

A few of the songs on the album charted in the United States, including "Sick of You" (which reached No. 8 on the Bubbling Under chart and No. 4 on the Alternative Songs chart); "Long Time", which peaked at No. 15 on the Alternative Songs chart; and "Mustache Man (Wasted)", which reached No. 22 on the Alternative Songs chart.

== Background ==
Near the beginning of recording, John McCrea and other members of the band stated that their new album would sound very different from their previous material. In an interview with the Sacramento News, McCrea revealed that the music on the album would range from "aggressive rock songs" to "weird pseudoclassical compositions". This album marked the first time that the band employed piano, which McCrea had previously eschewed because he felt it sounded "too classy". This was also the first time McCrea used reverb for any vocal tracks; he had previously avoided the effect because he thought too many bands used it as a "cheap" way to sound "grandiose".

== Recording and release ==
During the first recording sessions, Cake released a statement saying the band would convert the electrical components in their studio so it would work solely on solar power. Panels were installed by Borrego Solar and all of Showroom of Compassion was recorded using the new system. Subsequently, the album was recorded solely on solar energy in Cake's refitted studio, rechristened "Upbeat Studio".

The band also offered a limited autographed version of the album for pre-sale.

The album was released in Australia in May 2011 through Inertia Music.

Cake worked with Callicore Studio in 2011 and released an animated music video for the song "Long Time".

== Packaging ==
The design for Showroom of Compassion marks a slight stylistic departure from previous Cake releases. The cover features a shaded, framed image instead of the band's usual flat-color printed imagery. The design for the album is credited to Aesthetic Apparatus. In keeping with the band's environmental activism, the album insert notes that the material used to make the album was "100% recycled paper stock and vegetable dyes". The physical release of Showroom of Compassion was packaged with a temporary tattoo of a bee, which the band asked fans to apply to themselves, take pictures of, and post online.

== Critical reception ==
Professional ratings
Aggregate scores
Source	Rating
Metacritic	72/100
Review scores
Source	Rating
AllMusic	3.5/5 stars
The A.V. Club	B+
Beats Per Minute	80%
Consequence of Sound	2.5/5 stars
Entertainment Weekly	B+
Los Angeles Times	3/4 stars
Paste	7.7/10
PopMatters	7/10
Rock Sound	6/10
Rolling Stone	3/5 stars

According to the review aggregator Metacritic, Showroom of Compassion received "generally favorable reviews" based on a weighted average score of 72 out of 100 from 17 critic scores. Many critics complimented the band for sticking to their unique style. Mark Deming from AllMusic writes, "Willful eccentricity is something that demands a certain degree of commitment [...] So Cake are to be commended for sticking to their oddball guns for close to 20 years." Brett Singer from The A.V. Club maintained that "[The album] isn't a huge departure from what Cake boss John McCrea and company have done before.... But as with your favorite dessert, there's nothing wrong with another helping."

== Commercial performance ==
Showroom of Compassion was a commercial success. Domestically, the album debuted at number one on the Billboard 200, the Top Alternative Albums, Independent Albums, and the Rock Albums charts. On the Billboard 200, the album moved 44,000 copies, making it the lowest-selling number-one album since Billboard began using Nielsen SoundScan to track unit sales, until Amos Lee's Mission Bell set the record two weeks later. Despite it being the band's first top ten album, the album sold considerably fewer copies than previous albums that had debuted at lower positions. In its second week it fell to No. 25, selling another 15,000 after a decline of 67%. As of 2017, it is the fifth largest fall from No. 1; at the time it was the largest drop since 2006's Light Grenades by Incubus. In Canada, the album debuted at No. 15.

== Track listing ==
Standard edition
No.	Title	Writer(s)	Length
1.	"Federal Funding"	McCrea, McCurdy, Nelson	3:50
2.	"Long Time"	McCrea, DiFiore	4:36
3.	"Got to Move"	McCrea	3:40
4.	"What's Now Is Now" (Frank Sinatra cover)	Bob Gaudio, Jake Holmes	3:37
5.	"Mustache Man (Wasted)"	McCrea, McCurdy, Nelson	4:04
6.	"Teenage Pregnancy"	McCrea	2:41
7.	"Sick of You"	McCrea, McCurdy	3:18
8.	"Easy to Crash"	McCrea	4:08
9.	"Bound Away"	McCrea, Nelson	3:25
10.	"The Winter"	McCrea, DiFiore	4:06
11.	"Italian Guy"	McCrea	3:11
Total length:			40:24

iTunes bonus tracks
No.	Title	Writer(s)	Length
12.	"Huge Misunderstanding"	DiFiore, McCurdy, Tom Ze	2:38
13.	"The Federal Funding March" (pre-order bonus track)		3:36
14.	"Sick of You" (music video)		3:25

== Personnel ==
- John McCrea – lead vocals, acoustic guitar, piano, Nord keyboards
- Vincent DiFiore – trumpet, euphonium, various keyboards
- Xan McCurdy – electric guitar, acoustic guitar, synthesizer
- Gabriel Nelson – bass guitar, electric guitar, Rheem organ, other things
- Paulo Baldi – drums

=== Additional musicians ===
- Tom Monson – drums
- Aaron Redfield – drums
- Pete McNeal – drums
- Greg Brown – electric guitar on "Bound Away"
- Charlie Wallace – pedal steel on "Bound Away"

== Charts ==
=== Weekly charts ===
Chart (2011)	Peak position
Canadian Albums (Billboard)	15
US Billboard 200	1
US Top Alternative Albums (Billboard)	1
US Independent Albums (Billboard)	1
US Top Rock Albums (Billboard)	1

=== Year-end charts ===
Chart (2011)	Position
US Top Rock Albums (Billboard)	59
