= Tour Nuggets =

EP by Cake
- Released: 1995
- Genre: Alternative
- Length: 12:03
- Label: Capricorn Records
- Producer: Cake

Cake chronology
| 'Three Song Sampler' (1995) | Tour Nuggets (1995) | A Piece of Cake (1996) |

Tour Nuggets is the name of a cassette-only release by alternative rock band Cake. It was released exclusively in Canada.

== Track listing ==
1. "The Distance" - 3:00
2. "Race Car Ya-Yas" - 1:21
3. "It's Coming Down" - 3:44
4. "Nugget" - 3:58
