= The High Speed Scene (album) =

Studio album by The High Speed Scene
- Released: March 22, 2005
- Recorded: 2002–2004 at Grandmaster Recorders LTD., Hollywood, CA
- Genre: Power pop
- Length: 30:50
- Label: Star Trak; Interscope
- Producer: Dana Deathray; The High Speed Scene; Clint Roth; Chad Hugo (exec.); Pharrell Williams (exec.); Rob Walker (exec.)

The High Speed Scene chronology
The High Speed Scene (2004)	The High Speed Scene (2005)

Professional ratings
Review scores
Source	Rating
Allmusic	3/5 stars
Punknews.org	0.5/5 stars
PopMatters	(7/10)

The High Speed Scene is the self-titled third release and debut studio album by power pop band The High Speed Scene. It was released on March 22, 2005 by Star Trak and Interscope Records. "The Iroc-Z Song" was featured in the video game MVP Baseball 2005. "Allaboutit" was featured in the video game MLB 2006. The band has no other significant releases since.

== Track listing ==
1. For the Kids (2:12)
2. Assingear (2:27)
3. The Iroc-Z Song (3:21)
4. Hottie (3:14)
5. Fuck and Spend (1:28)
6. In the Know (3:13)
7. Hello Hello (2:40)
8. Crazy Star (2:56)
9. Last Chance (3:36)
10. Revolutionary Fervor (2:13)
11. Allaboutit (2:56)
12. All Swans (2:34)

== Personnel ==
- Max Hart - lead vocals, guitar, art direction, drawings, producer
- Domen Vajevec - bass
- Adam Aaronson - drums
- Dana Gumbiner - vocals, producer (as Dana Deathray)
- Loic Villepontoux - MC
- Chad Hugo - executive producer
- Rob Walker - executive producer
- Pharrell Williams - executive producer
- Alex Lake - art direction, photography
- Clint Roth - engineer, producer
- Joe Barresi - engineer
- Andrew Alekel - assistant engineer
- George Marino - mastering
- Clif Norrell - mixing
- Joe Peluso - assistant engineer, mixing assistant
- Ariel Chobaz - assistant
- Seth Friedman - A&R
- Martin Kierszenbaum - A&R
- Jerry Ray Johnson - drum technician
- Ami Spishock - product manager
