= Sinking Ship (song) =

Single by Cake
- Released: October 25, 2018
- Genre: Rock
- Length: 4:23
- Label: Universal Music Group
- Songwriter: John McCrea

Cake singles chronology
| "Sick of You" (2010) | "Sinking Ship" (2018) |

"Sinking Ship" is a song by the American rock band Cake and was released on October 25, 2018.

== Background ==
According to John McCrea, the song is a project he had worked on since he was 16, but put away for a long time. He wrote new music for the song as "the theme seems really relevant".

The song is the band's first new original song in seven years.

== Release ==
Cake announced on July 31, 2018 that big news would be announced to their fan mail subscribers in early August. The song was then exclusively released on Cake's SoundCloud on August 3, 2018. It was later deleted from Cake's SoundCloud channel in late September. On October 25, 2018, Cake then announced that "Sinking Ship" was out for download on all digital platforms on their Facebook. All of the proceeds from the song are donated to the organization Doctors without Borders.

== Music video ==
A stop motion music video featuring claymation figures was released on October 25, 2018. The music video was directed by Owen Streeter from Head Cleaner Films.
