= The High Speed Scene (EP) =

EP by The High Speed Scene
- Released: November 16, 2004
- Genre: Power pop
- Length: 9:05
- Label: Interscope

The High Speed Scene chronology
Fuck n' Spend (2003)	The High Speed Scene (2004)	The High Speed Scene (2005)

The High Speed Scene is the self-titled second EP by Power pop band The High Speed Scene. It was released on November 16, 2004 by Interscope Records.

== Track listing ==
1. The I Roc Z Song (3:22)
2. For the Kids (2:12)
3. Switch it (demo) (3:31)
