= Deathray =

American band

Deathray (band)
- Origin: Sacramento, California, United States
- Genres: Alternative rock, pop punk, pop rock, ska punk, new wave
- Years active: 1998–2007
- Members: Dana Gumbiner; Greg Brown; Victor Damiani; Todd Roper

Deathray was a band from Sacramento, California, formed by former Cake members Greg Brown and Victor Damiani, and Dana Gumbiner, a musician formerly of the Sacramento indie band Little Guilt Shrine. It was active between 1998 and 2007.

After leaving Cake, Brown and bassist Victor Damiani met up with Gumbiner, who was playing solo shows under a variety of names, most notably The Micronauts. The three recruited multi-talented rock and jazz drummer James Neil and keyboardist Max Hart to form Deathray. After selling over 3,000 copies of their EP, Deathray was signed to Capricorn Records.

Their self-titled debut album was produced by Eric Valentine and released in 2000. While the album received critical praise, the band's future became murky during the collapse of Capricorn and a hastily organized nationwide tour. After a long battle, Deathray was dropped from Capricorn, but regained control of the masters from their album, which they have since released on their own label, Doppler Records.

The band continued to play Northern California shows and recorded a subsequent EP, White Sleeves in their own studio, Brighton Sound, which was released in 2002 on Doppler Records. The single "Let's be Friends" also appears on the subsequent album Believe Me.

Shortly thereafter, Hart left the band to move to Los Angeles and form his own band, The High Speed Scene, with their initial EP release also on Doppler Records, and subsequent full release on its major-label debut on the Neptunes' imprint, Star-Trak Records.

Neil also left Deathray after the release of their first album, but went on to join numerous bands, including: Milwaukee (as keyboardist with Johnny Gutenberger of Two Sheds, and Chris Robyn of Far), Red Planet, An Angle, Jay Shaner's Cowboy Killers, and he is currently the drummer for the California-country band The Golden Cadillacs. Following the recording of Cake's album Comfort Eagle, drummer Todd Roper left Cake to rejoin the former members now in Deathray.

Brown (releasing his solo EP in June 2023) and Gumbiner (continuing his solo electronica project Night Night, and currently owner/producer/engineer at Station To Station Media + Production, and a contributing writer at TapeOp Magazine) remain the principal songwriters of Deathray, with Damiani also penning several tunes for the band.

A Deathray song titled "I Wanna Lose Control" appears on the soundtrack to the 2006 animated film Open Season, along with a cover of Paul Westerberg's "Wild as I Wanna Be". These are the first two Deathray songs published by a major record label since the band's former LPs.

As of July 1, 2007, the band has split up, according to an entry on their official website.

== Discography ==
=== Studio albums ===
- Deathray (2000)

The band's self-titled album was released in 2000 with producer Eric Valentine (Third Eye Blind, Smash Mouth, Citizen King) and released on Doppler Records, a small indie label run by the band's designer, Keara Fallon, and Deathray bassist, Victor Damiani, which they started when Capricorn Records collapsed. The genre is usually thought of as pop or post-punk. It has received generous college and radio airplay, making the charts in college radio. Drummer Michael Urbano guest appeared on the recording of the album. The Warhol-esque design was by label partner and band supporter, Keara Fallon.

- Believe Me (2005)

Deathray self-released their second album in 2005. Eric Valentine returned as producer. Todd Roper appeared on drums. Again, despite garnering critical acclaim, there was little interest from major labels.

=== Extended Plays (EPs) ===
- White Sleeves (2002)

== Lineup ==
- Dana Gumbiner – vocals, keyboard, guitar
- Greg Brown – guitar, vocals
- Victor Damiani – bass
- Todd Roper – drums, vocals
  - formerly James Neil
  - formerly Max Hart

== See also ==
- Cake
