= Short Skirt/Long Jacket =

2000 single by American rock band Cake

Single by Cake

from the album Comfort Eagle
- Released: 2001
- Recorded: 2000
- Genre: Alternative rock, funk rock
- Length: 3:24
- Label: Columbia
- Songwriter: John McCrea
- Producer: Cake

Cake singles chronology
"Sheep Go to Heaven" (2001)	"Short Skirt/Long Jacket" (2001)	"Sick of You" (2010)

"Short Skirt/Long Jacket" is the first single by American alternative rock band Cake from their 2001 album Comfort Eagle. It peaked at number 7 on Billboard's Modern Rock Tracks chart. It is one of the band's most recognizable songs with its funky grooves, opening trumpet lick, and use of the vibraslap.

== Lyrics and background ==
The lyrics describe the singer's ideal woman as one who wears a "short skirt and a long jacket." She is portrayed as someone who is successful in business and taken seriously; for example, she "uses a machete to cut through red tape."

John McCrea said the song was "about prosperity and depression" and the strange behavior of the human mating ritual.

During the verses of the song, the band plays a variation of the chord structure from The Velvet Underground's "Sweet Jane".

== Music video ==
The associated music vox pop video is composed entirely of people listening to the song on headphones and their reactions. Responses include enthusiasm, critique, and apathy; some dance, while one Ralph Walbridge, poet, gives the headphones back partway through, stating "uh... I've heard it all a million times, all the way back to all of the old records - which were much better - when they first came out, back in the 1940s." Other comments include Dr. Bruce L. Thiessen's (aka Dr. B.L.T.) "as a psychologist, I'd have to say it has therapeutic value because it releases something deep inside". The video was nominated for Breakthrough Video at the 2002 MTV Video Music Awards, but the White Stripes ultimately secured the award.

MuchMusic released an official "Canadian" version of the video that uses footage of people in Toronto, Vancouver, and Montreal. The video humorously censors some foreign words spoken by non-English speakers due to the words' strange pronunciations. The video also featured an appearance from Ed the Sock.

There were various versions of this music video. Additional versions were filmed after the record company suggested the first video would not hold up well to repeated viewing. The videos filmed for an estimated cost of less than $20,000. The Mexican version was directed by Alejandro "Chicle" and edited by Alejandro Davalos Cantu.

== In other media ==
The TV series Chuck used an instrumental version of the song as its opening theme song from 2007 to 2012.

== Track listing ==
Initial pressing
No.	Title	Length
1.	"Short Skirt/Long Jacket"	3:24
2.	"Arco Arena" (vocal version)	2:10
3.	"Short Skirt/Long Jacket" (video)	3:45

Alternate pressing
No.	Title	Length
1.	"Short Skirt/Long Jacket" (LP version)	3:24
2.	"Short Skirt/Long Jacket" (radio mix)	3:23

== Personnel ==
- John McCrea – vocals, keyboards, percussion, programming
- Vincent DiFiore – trumpet, keyboards, percussion, backing vocals
- Xan McCurdy – guitar, backing vocals
- Gabriel Nelson – bass, backing vocals
- Todd Roper – drums, percussion, backing vocals

== Charts ==
Chart (2001)	Peak position
Australia (ARIA)	44
Netherlands (Single Top 100)	87
Scotland Singles (OCC)	74
UK Singles (OCC)	63
US Bubbling Under Hot 100 (Billboard)	19
US Adult Pop Airplay (Billboard)	31
US Alternative Airplay (Billboard)	7

== Certifications ==
Region	Certification	Certified units/sales
New Zealand (RMNZ)	Gold	15,000^{‡}
United States (RIAA)	Platinum	1,000,000^{‡}
^{‡} Sales+streaming figures based on certification alone.

== Covers ==
- Hugh Sheridan covered this song on his 2009 debut album, Speak Love.
