= Pressure Chief =

Studio album by Cake
- Released: October 5, 2004
- Genres: Alternative rock; post-punk; new wave; indie rock; experimental rock
- Length: 36:16
- Label: Columbia
- Producer: Cake

Cake chronology
Comfort Eagle (2001)	Pressure Chief (2004)	B-Sides and Rarities (2007)

Singles from Pressure Chief
- 1. "No Phone" Released: August 24, 2004; 2. "Carbon Monoxide" Released: 2004

Pressure Chief is the fifth studio album by American band Cake, released on October 5, 2004 (pushed back from its original August release date). It was produced by the band and recorded in a converted house in Sacramento. Lead single "No Phone" peaked at No. 13 on the U.S. Billboard Modern Rock Tracks chart. Second single "Carbon Monoxide" garnered some airplay but failed to crack the Modern Rock Tracks top 40. The album was the band's second and final with Columbia Records.

== Release ==
The songs "She'll Hang the Baskets" and "Tougher Than It Is" were both originally written for Cake's 1998 album Prolonging the Magic. A bonus disc, Extra Value, was included in limited pre-orders of Pressure Chief.

On its opening week, Pressure Chief sold about 46,000 copies, debuting and peaking at number 17 on the Billboard 200. However, it fell to No. 55 the following week. By the next month, the album had only sold 91,478 copies.

== Critical reception ==
Professional ratings
Aggregate scores
Source	Rating
Metacritic	52/100
Review scores
Source	Rating
AllMusic	3.5/5 stars
Blender	2/5 stars
Cokemachineglow	56%
DIY	2/5 stars
Mojo	1/5 stars
Paste	3/5 stars
Playlouder	3.5/5 stars
Rolling Stone	2/5 stars
Stylus	7/10
Tiny Mix Tapes	3.5/5 stars

According to the review aggregator Metacritic, Pressure Chief received "mixed or average reviews" based on a weighted average score of 52 out of 100 from 8 critic scores.

In a review for AllMusic, Johnny Loftus wrote: "Pressure Chief marks Cake's tenth year with a set of sardonic, engaging alternative pop that shows the Sacramento band's economical sound unwilted after all these years." He also added that the song "No Phone" declaims "the encroachment of technology". Matt Weir of Tiny Mix Tapes gave a three-and-a-half stars out of five, calling the release the "weakest effort" by the band.

== Track listing ==
No.	Title	Writer(s)	Length
1.	"Wheels"	John McCrea, Carlos Forster	3:18
2.	"No Phone"	McCrea, Xan McCurdy	3:52
3.	"Take It All Away"	McCrea, Forster, Garth Klippert	3:58
4.	"Dime"	McCrea	3:37
5.	"Carbon Monoxide"	McCrea	3:10
6.	"The Guitar Man"	David Gates	3:54
7.	"Waiting"	McCrea, Vince DiFiore	3:56
8.	"She'll Hang the Baskets"	McCrea	2:43
9.	"End of the Movie"	McCrea	1:50
10.	"Palm of Your Hand"	McCrea	2:57
11.	"Tougher Than It Is"	McCrea, Gabriel Nelson	3:00

Japan bonus tracks
No.	Title	Length
12.	"Carbon Monoxide" (Karaoke Version)	3:10
13.	"No Phone" (Karaoke Version)	3:10
14.	"Wheels" (Karaoke Version)	3:17
15.	"Take It All Away" (Karaoke Version)	3:57

== Personnel ==
Cake

- John McCrea – acoustic guitar, keyboard, percussion, lead vocals, cover design
- Vince DiFiore – trumpet, melodica, keyboard, percussion, background vocals
- Xan McCurdy – electric and acoustic guitar, bass, drums, keyboard, background vocals
- Gabe Nelson – bass, keyboard, drums, electric and acoustic guitar, background vocals

Additional musicians

- Tyler Pope – additional keyboard, percussion and guitar (on "No Phone", "Dime", "The Guitar Man", and "Palm Of Your Hand")
- Chuck Prophet – electric guitar (on "She'll Hang The Baskets")
- Paulo Baldi – drums (on "No Phone", and "Carbon Monoxide")
- Matt McCord – drums (on "The Guitar Man")
- Todd Roper – drums on (on "She'll Hang The Baskets", and "Tougher Than It Is")
- Greg Vincent – pedal steel guitar (on "She'll Hang The Baskets", and "Palm Of Your Hand")

Additional personnel

- Cake – Arranger, Producer, Engineer, Mixing
- Craig Long – Engineer, Mixing
- Mark Needham – Engineer, Mixing
- Patrick Olguin – Engineer, Mixing
- Kirt Shearer – Engineer, Mixing
- Don C. Tyler – Mastering

== Charts ==
Chart performance for Pressure Chief
Chart (2004)	Peak position
French Albums (SNEP)	79
German Albums (Offizielle Top 100)	95
Swiss Albums (Schweizer Hitparade)	44
US Billboard 200	17
US Top Album Sales (Billboard)	17

Singles – Billboard (United States)

Year	Single	Chart	Position
2004	"No Phone"	Modern Rock Tracks	13

== Television performances ==
- "No Phone" on The Tonight Show with Jay Leno on Monday, October 4, 2004
- "Wheels" on Jimmy Kimmel Live!
- "No Phone" on The Late Late Show (with guest host Tom Arnold) on Tuesday, October 5, 2004

== Appearances in other media ==
- The song "Wheels" is featured in the soundtrack of the film I Love You, Man.
