= Fuck n' Spend =

Extended play by The High Speed Scene

Fuck N' Spend

EP by The High Speed Scene
- Released: November 3, 2003
- Recorded: 2003
- Genre: Power pop
- Length: 3:13
- Label: Arista

The High Speed Scene chronology
Fuck N' Spend (2003)	The High Speed Scene (2004)

Fuck N' Spend is the debut release and first EP by power pop band The High Speed Scene. It was released on Arista Records on November 3, 2003.

== Track listing ==
1. Fuck N' Spend (1:38)
2. Fuck N' Spend (1:35)
