= Frank French =

- Born: Sacramento, California
- Genres: Alternative rock, classic rock, punk rock
- Occupations: Musician, drummer, teacher
- Instruments: Vocals, drums, guitar, bass, piano, percussion, keyboards
- Years active: 1976–present
- Labels: RCA, Capitol, DGC, Dischord

Frank French is an American rock drummer from Sacramento, California. He is a former member of the bands True West, Thin White Rope, Permanent Wave, the Mumbles, Roughousers, the inversions, and Cake. He was the original drummer for Cake, departing from the band after the release of their debut album, Motorcade of Generosity. He has played in several bands since then, and continues to live in Sacramento.
