= Sick of You (Cake song) =

Single by Cake

from the album Showroom of Compassion
- Released: September 22, 2010
- Genre: Alternative rock
- Length: 3:18
- Label: Upbeat Records
- Songwriters: John McCrea, Xan McCurdy

Cake singles chronology
| "Carbon Monoxide" (2004) | "Sick of You" (2010) | "Long Time" (2011) |

"Sick of You" is the name of the lead-off single from the alternative rock band Cake's sixth studio album, Showroom of Compassion. The song is Cake's fourth Top 10 hit on the Alternative Songs chart, hitting number 4. The song also has hit number 13 on the US Rock Songs chart and peaked at #1 on the Mediabase's Canadian Alternative Rock chart.

== Music and lyrics ==
Lyrically, the song is about items that the band members of Cake hate. John McCrea said of the song, "It's about how when you hate things, the circle of hate starts rather broadly. You hate the President or a big movie star, someone you'll probably never meet. Gradually though, the circle tightens and the objects of hate get closer and closer to the hater. Now it's your uncle or your mother, now it's your close friend, and finally it's you. Bummer."

== Track listing ==
1. "Sick of You" – 3:18
2. "Italian Guy" – 3:11

== Chart positions ==
=== Weekly charts ===
| Chart (2011) | Peak position |
|---|---|
| Canada (Canadian Hot 100) | 72 |
| Canada Rock (Billboard) | 4 |
| US Alternative Airplay (Billboard) | 4 |
| US Bubbling Under Hot 100 (Billboard) | 8 |
| US Hot Rock & Alternative Songs (Billboard) | 14 |

=== Year-end charts ===
| Chart (2011) | Position |
|---|---|
| US Alternative Songs (Billboard) | 29 |
