= Safetyville USA =

Traffic playground and miniature city in Sacramento, California, US

Coordinates: 38.552412°N 121.335218°W

Safetyville, USA
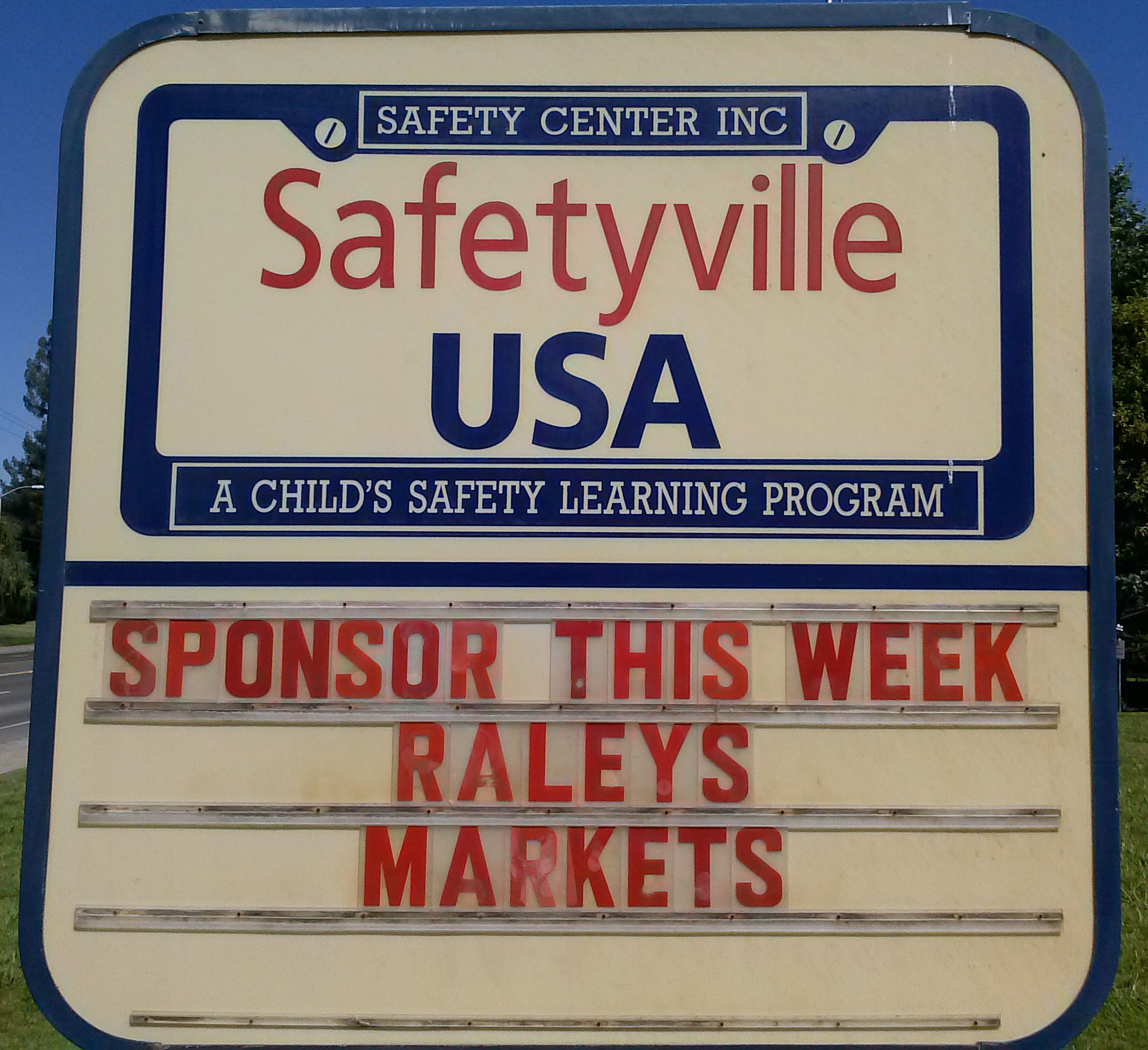
- Signage on street in front of Safetyville, USA on Bradshaw Road in Sacramento, California.
- Founded: 1984
- Founder: Safety Center Incorporated
- Type: 501(c)3
- Purpose: Child health and safety education
- Location: Sacramento, CA, USA
- Origins: Safetyville USA Children’s Safety & Health Education Programs
- Website: www.safetycenter.org

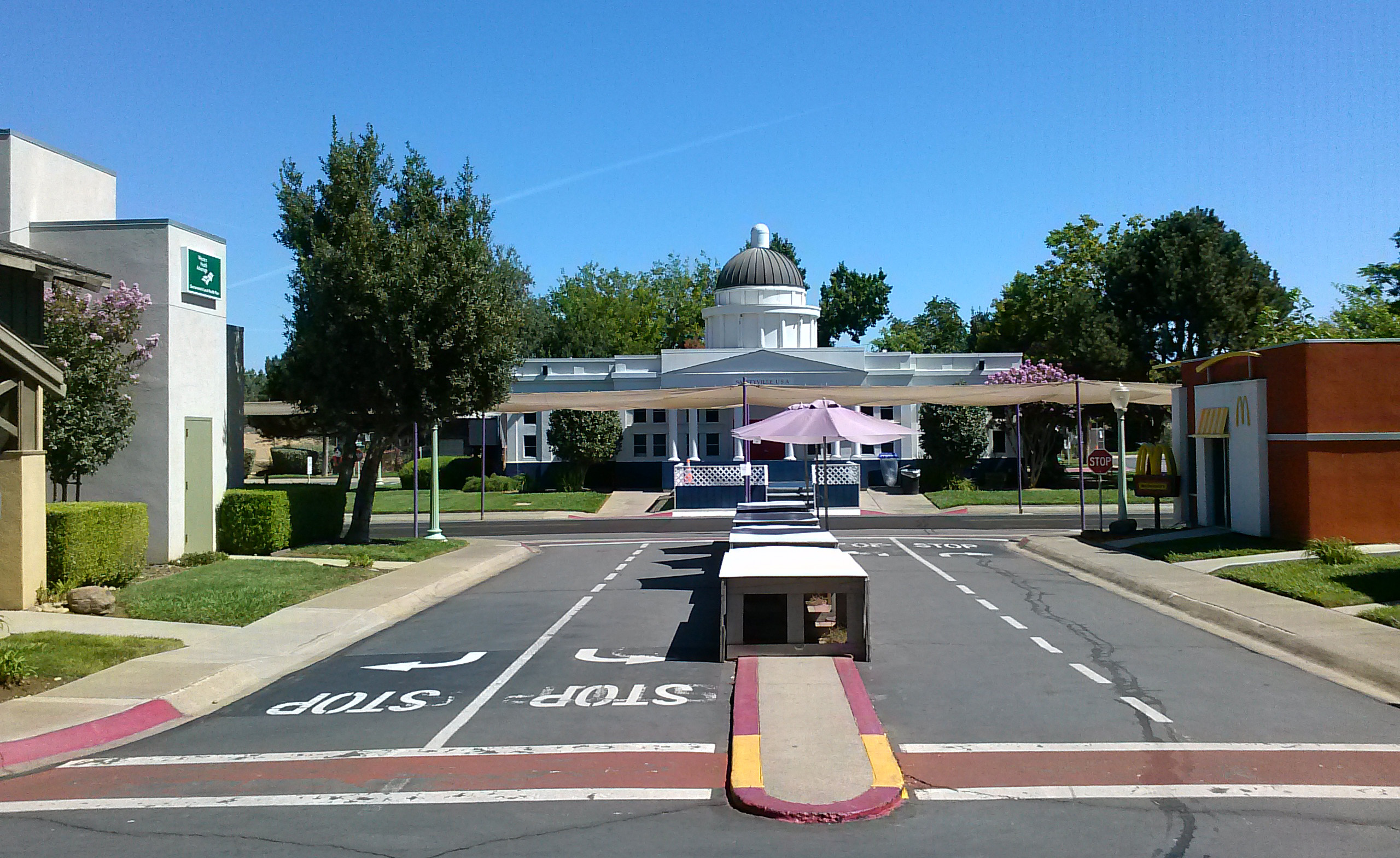
Safetyville USA Children's Safety & Health Education Programs image of the miniature Capital Building at entrance of Safetyville on Bradshaw Road in Sacramento, California in August 2013

Safetyville, USA is a traffic park and miniature city that spans a little over 3 acres of land in Sacramento, California. It is a program designed to provide safety education to young children in an interactive manner. The miniature town features scaled-down replicas of the California State Capitol building, municipal building, business buildings, and various streets in Sacramento, California.

== Founding ==
Safetyville, USA is part of the non-profit Safety Center, Inc.'s Children's Safety Program, which provides life-saving safety skills and awareness education. The one-third scale town features real sidewalks, crosswalks, streetlights, a police, fire and sheriff station, and businesses commonly found in any city, including McDonald's and Taco Bell. In June 1998, Dick Cable, a professional broadcaster for KXTV, became the Honorary Mayor of Safetyville. Cable was the first Sacramento broadcaster to win an Emmy award.

== Goals ==
The goal of the Safetyville program is to reduce injury and potential deaths of children from preventable accidents. The program aims to provide a hands-on, interactive experience rather than overwhelming children with information through traditional classroom education methods. Trained volunteer tour guides lead children, ranging from preschool age to third grade, through the miniature city. The children are taught health and fitness, and a variety of safety skills including fire safety, bicycle safety, pedestrian safety, electrical safety, stranger danger, and railroad safety. In 2009, Safetyville, USA celebrated its 25th anniversary, and over 200,000 Northern California children had already benefited from this educational experience provided by the child safety program. Approximately 10,000 children visit Safetyville, USA each year.

== Hands on experience ==
The hands-on experience at Safetyville includes pushing buttons and learning to look both ways before crossing the street using the working street lights and crosswalk lights. Before watching a video at the "fire station," the tour guide engages the children by asking questions, and there is a "quiz" after the video. There are many opportunities for questions and answers, as well as opportunities for child volunteers to help throughout the tour. Additionally, the children are taught how to make a real 911 call, and they practice dialing the correct number and how to communicate with a 911 operator. They are also taught the "stop, drop, and roll" technique during the fire safety portion of the session, and they have the chance to practice the technique on the spot.

== Events ==
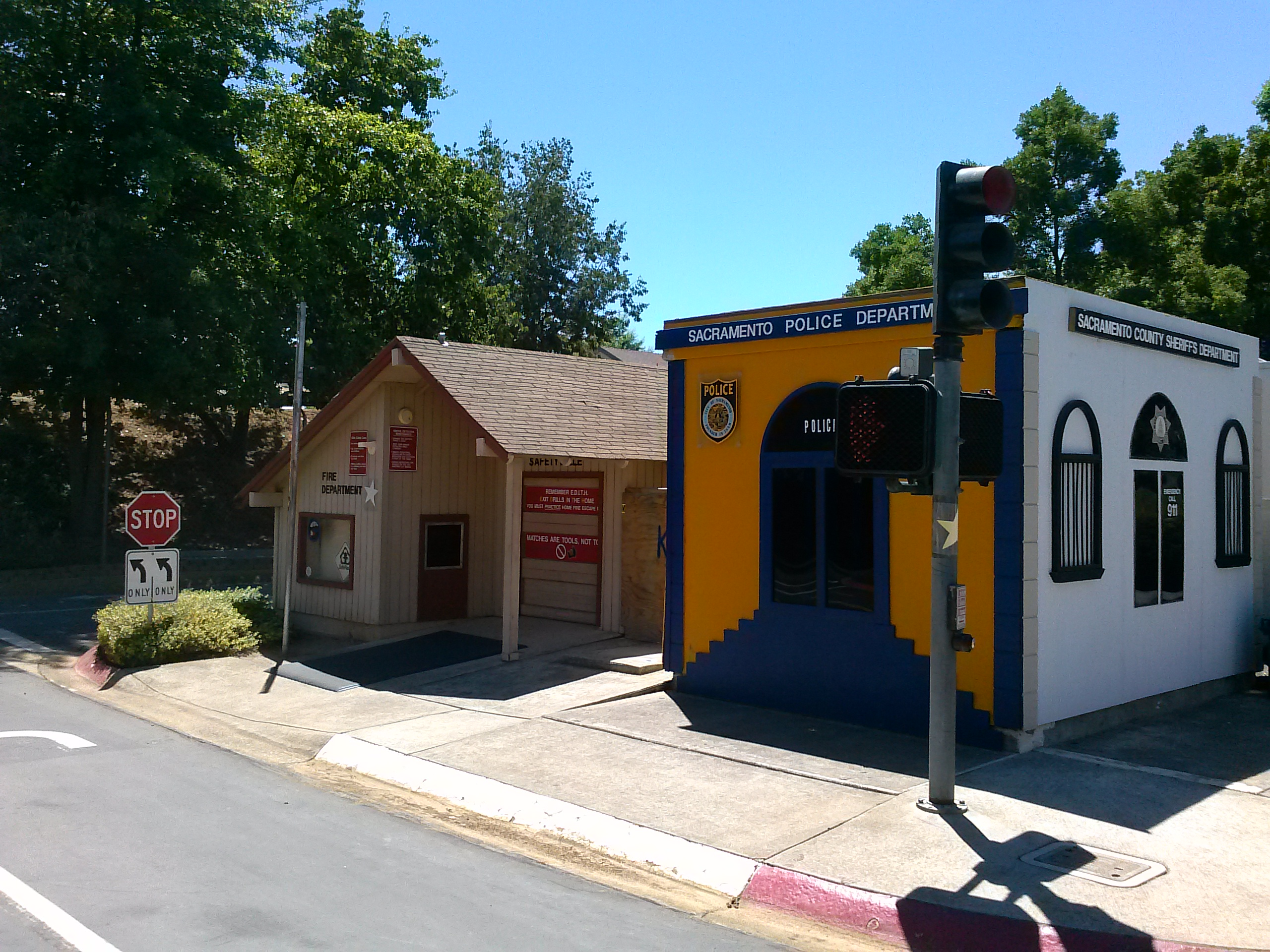
Miniature Sacramento Police Department

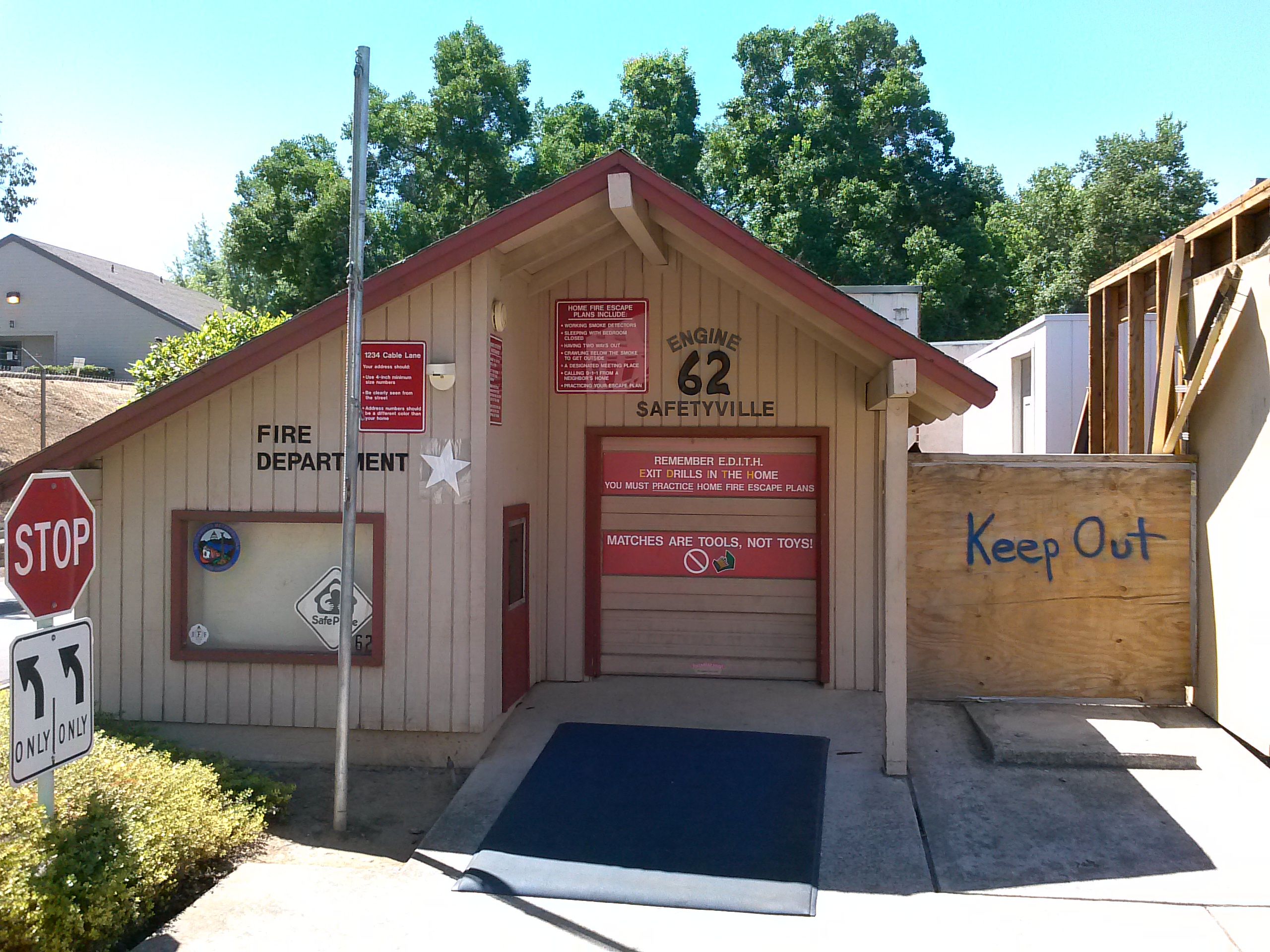
Miniature Sacramento Fire Department

Safetyville, USA sponsors many events throughout the year, including "Halloween Haunt," "Safetyville Family Health and Safety Expo," "Taste of the Little City," and in October 2012 hosted the annual "Fire Fighter Chili Cook-off." Safetyville also has a child 'Mayor of Safetyville' who presides at the "Halloween Haunt" and "Safetyville Family Health and Safety Expo."

=== Halloween haunt ===
"Halloween Haunt" is an event hosted to promote a safer Halloween experience. It features face-painting, magic shows, and mazes. The event is suitable for younger children, but all ages are welcome. Children can "Trick or Treat" in a secure environment and participate in costume contests, games, and raffles. Safetyville celebrated its 21st "Halloween Haunt" in October 2012.

=== Family Health and Safety Expo ===
"Safetyville Family Health and Safety Expo" is an annual event that provides information about health and child care. It provides information to families about local crisis centers and child immunizations, and teaches families how and where to seek help if needed. Kids receive gifts throughout the expo, which have included items such as coupons to pick up free child ID kits, first aid supplies, pencils, dental hygiene tools, and pedometers.

=== Taste of the little city ===
Safetyville celebrated its 12th annual "Taste of the Little City" event in May 2013. The popular event raises funds for Safetyville's activities and features top restaurateurs and vintners from the Sacramento region, nearby Napa Valley, and the California Gold Country, as well as media celebrities.

== Birthday celebration ==
In June 2009, Safetyville celebrated 25 years of educating youngsters about the importance of safety. The celebration was held in combination with the "Family Health and Safety Expo". Birthday cake and ice cream were served, and Safetyville unveiled their new mascot, a dog clothed in a blue cap and red vest. Scheduled to attend the days events were News10's Darla Givens and Dave Thomson, Trevor Wyatt (Magician), Kovar's Satori Academy (Martial Arts), and dancers from Granite Bay Dance Connection, along with Jennifer Wood of 96.1 FM.

== Sponsorships ==
Safetyville, USA allows corporations and small businesses to get involved with the program through sponsorship of the miniature buildings. Some of the State and regional organizations represented in Safetyville include the California Highway Patrol, California Department of Motor Vehicles, Sacramento Metro Fire District, Sacramento City Fire Department, Sacramento Police and Sheriff Departments, Arnold Law Firm, and others.

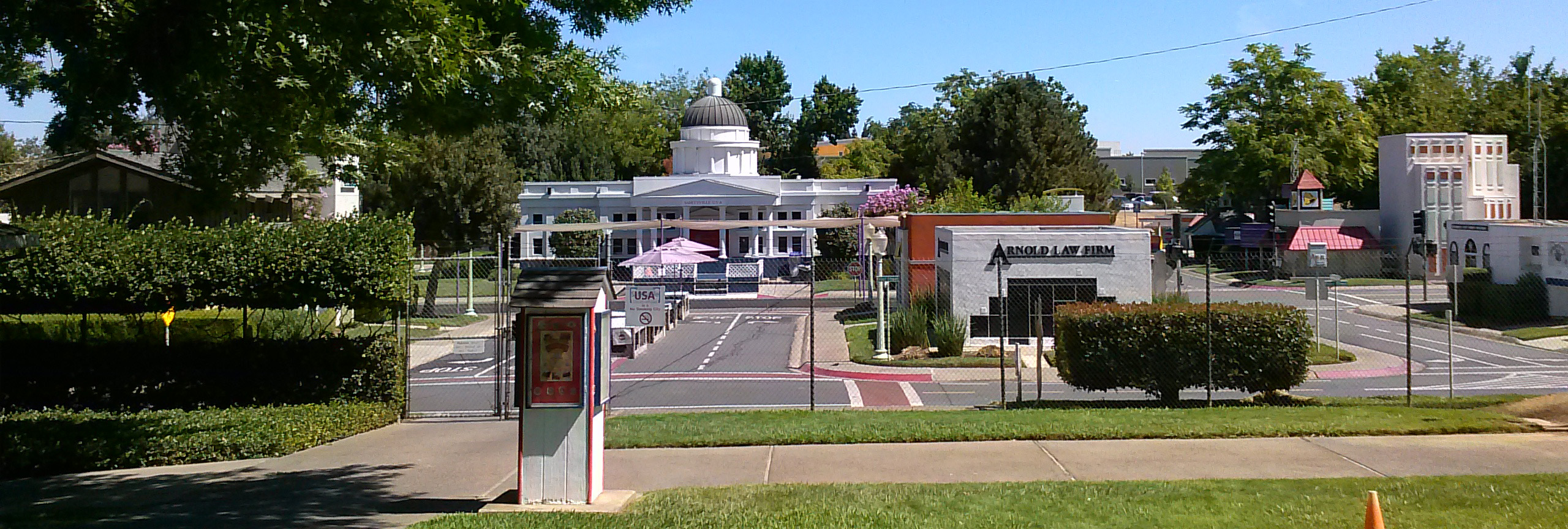
Cityscape of Safetyville, USA in Sacramento, California
