= Sheep Go to Heaven =

Single by Cake

from the album Prolonging the Magic
- Released: 1999
- Recorded: 1998
- Genre: Alternative rock
- Length: 4:44
- Label: Capricorn Records
- Songwriter: John McCrea
- Producer: Cake

Cake singles chronology
"Never There" (1998)	"Sheep Go to Heaven" (1999)	"Short Skirt/Long Jacket" (2001)

"Sheep Go to Heaven" is a single by American alternative rock band Cake from their 1998 album Prolonging the Magic. The song's title references the parable of The Sheep and the Goats from Chapter 25 of the Gospel of Matthew. The lyrics state "so astutely" that the good go to everlasting life, while the evil will go away with Satan and his avatars. The lyrics invoke the belief in justice and Armageddon, as well as "Hotel California": a "smell of Karma was heavy in the air."

== Critical reception ==
In a mixed, standalone review of the song, Billboard wrote that while it’s "a catchy novelty track," it ends “like a campfire ditty….”

== Track listing ==
No.	Title	Length
1.	"Sheep Go to Heaven (Edit)"	3:47
2.	"Never There (Live)"	3:23
3.	"Is This Love? (Live)"	4:30
4.	"Sheep Go to Heaven"	4:44

== Personnel ==
- John McCrea – vocals, rhythm and acoustic guitar, piano
- Vincent DiFiore – trumpet, percussion, backing vocals
- Gabriel Nelson – bass, backing vocals
- Todd Roper – drums, percussion, backing vocals
- Chuck Prophet – guitar

== Music video ==
The music video for "Sheep Go to Heaven" is animated in a style reminiscent of South Park, and features members of Cake dressed as a Kiss cover band, playing in a sports bar. A disgruntled employee of a greeting-card company enters the sports bar with a machete, and massacres the crowd, sending the band to Heaven. Later, the employee is convicted, executed, and sent to Hell. The video was directed by Mark Kornweibel.

== Chart positions ==
The song debuted on the Modern Rock Tracks (or Alternative rock) charts on February 20, 1999, peaking at the 16th slot, staying up for 14 weeks, and being the second highest ranking song of the album and the band’s fifth highest-ranking single ever.

Chart (1999)	Peak position
US Modern Rock Tracks	16
