= Prolonging the Magic =

Studio album by Cake
- Released: October 6, 1998
- Genre: Alternative rock, experimental rock, alternative country
- Length: 48:13
- Label: Capricorn
- Producer: John McCrea

Cake chronology
Fashion Nugget (1996)	Prolonging the Magic (1998)	Comfort Eagle (2001)

Singles from Prolonging the Magic
- 1. "Never There" Released: September 27, 1998; 2. "Let Me Go" Released: June 16, 1999; 3. "You Turn The Screws" Released: 1999; 4. "Sheep Go to Heaven" Released: 2000

Prolonging the Magic is the third studio album by American alternative rock band Cake. It was released on October 6, 1998, on Capricorn Records. The sole successful single was "Never There". The album was recorded after the departure of guitarist Greg Brown and features a rotating lineup of musicians to replace him. One of them, Xan McCurdy, became his full-time replacement. On its opening week, Prolonging the Magic sold about 44,000 copies, debuting at No. 33 on the Billboard 200 chart. On 28 September 1999 the album was certified platinum by the RIAA for shipments of one million copies.

The album was given a parental advisory sticker not because of profanity but for Satanic-themed lyrics. Some copies do not feature a sticker, with the only difference being that the song "Satan Is My Motor" has been retitled "Motor".

When asked in 1999 if the song "You Turn the Screws" was directed at recently-departed band members Greg Brown and Victor Damiani, the band responded "Not really. It is a song about power dynamics."

The song "Hem of Your Garment" was featured in the 2000 film Me, Myself & Irene.

== Critical reception ==
Professional ratings
Review scores
Source	Rating
AllMusic	2.5/5 stars
Christgau's Consumer Guide	(neither)
Entertainment Weekly	C+
The New Rolling Stone Album Guide	2.5/5 stars
Pitchfork	6.8/10
Rolling Stone	3.5/5 stars
Spin	6/10

AllMusic wrote, "Supposedly their attempt to make a smugness- and irony-free album, Cake's third release does hold back the barbs a bit more than usual. And the strain shows. In these guys' hands, love songs without smirks and pop tunes straight up come out forced."

== Track listing ==
All tracks are written by John McCrea, except where noted.

No.	Title	Writer(s)	Length
1.	"Satan Is My Motor"	McCrea, Gabriel Nelson, Tyler Pope	3:12
2.	"Mexico"		3:26
3.	"Never There"		2:44
4.	"Guitar"		3:40
5.	"You Turn the Screws"		4:13
6.	"Walk on By"		3:48
7.	"Sheep Go to Heaven"		4:44
8.	"When You Sleep"		3:58
9.	"Hem of Your Garment"		3:43
10.	"Alpha Beta Parking Lot"	Vince DiFiore, McCrea	3:30
11.	"Let Me Go"	Jim Campilongo, McCrea	3:29
12.	"Cool Blue Reason"		3:27
13.	"Where Would I Be?"	McCrea, Nelson, Joe Snook	3:52

Japan bonus tracks
No.	Title	Length
14.	"Satan Is My Motor" (Karaoke Version)	3:14
15.	"Never There" (Karaoke Version)	2:46
16.	"Sheep Go to Heaven" (Karaoke Version)	4:49
17.	"When You Sleep" (Karaoke Version)	3:59

== Personnel ==
Cake

- Vince DiFiore - trumpet, keyboards, percussion, background vocals and arranging
- John McCrea – vocals, acoustic & electric guitar, piano, organ, Moog, producing, arranging and design
- Gabe Nelson - bass, mandolin, electric guitar, piano and arranging
- Todd Roper - drums, percussion, background vocals and arranging

Additional musicians

- Xan McCurdy – electric guitar on track 9
- Rusty Miller – electric guitar on track 3
- Tyler Pope – arranging and electric guitar on tracks 1, 2, 3, 4, 5, 8, 9 and 10
- Chuck Prophet - arranging and electric guitar on tracks 4, 7 and 12
- Jim Campilongo - arranging and electric guitar on tracks 4, 6 and 11
- Ben Morss - arranging and piano on track 5
- David Palmer - keyboards on track 9
- Greg Vincent - pedal steel guitar on tracks 2, 6 and 9
- Mark Needham - additional percussion, engineering, and mixing
- Richard Lyman - musical saw on track 4

Additional personnel

- Joe Johnston - engineering
- Jay Bowman - engineering
- Gabriel Shepard - engineering
- Justin Phelps - engineering
- Scott Reams - engineering
- Rafael Serrano - engineering
- Kirt Shearer - engineering and mixing
- Craig Long - engineering and mixing
- Greg Brown - arranging
- Keara Fallon - design
- Don C. Tyler - mastering

== Charts ==
Album - Billboard (United States)

Year	Chart	Position
1998	The Billboard 200	33

Singles - Billboard (United States)

Year	Single	Chart	Position
1998	"Never There"	Adult Top 40	29
1998	"Never There"	Modern Rock Tracks	1
1998	"Never There"	The Billboard Hot 100	78
1999	"Let Me Go"	Modern Rock Tracks	28
1999	"Never There"	Mainstream Rock Tracks	40
1999	"Sheep Go to Heaven"	Modern Rock Tracks	16

== Certifications ==
Region	Certification	Certified units/sales
United States (RIAA)	Platinum	1,000,000^{^}
^{^} Shipments figures based on certification alone.
