= Comfort Eagle =

Studio album by Cake
- Released: July 24, 2001
- Recorded: Paradise Studios in Sacramento, California, with additional recording at Hyde Street Studios in San Francisco, California
- Genre: Rock; pop; funk
- Length: 36:55
- Label: Columbia
- Producer: Cake

Cake chronology
Prolonging the Magic (1998)	Comfort Eagle (2001)	Pressure Chief (2004)

Singles from Comfort Eagle
- 1. "Short Skirt/Long Jacket" Released: August 14, 2001; 2. "Love You Madly" Released: 2001

Comfort Eagle is the fourth studio album by American alternative rock band Cake. It was released on July 24, 2001, on Columbia Records, their first with the company.

== Release ==
In its opening week, Comfort Eagle sold about 72,000 copies, debuting at number 13 on the Billboard 200. By 2002, the album had sold 408,000 copies. On February 2, 2003, it was certified gold by the RIAA for shipments of half a million copies.

The album's lead single was "Short Skirt/Long Jacket." The band asked fans to vote for the album's second single via their website, with the album's title track "Comfort Eagle" being the eventual winner, but its release as a single was canceled after the September 11 attacks. The band wrote: "Due to unforeseen changes in national media, CAKE must now change its upcoming single from 'Comfort Eagle' to 'Love You Madly' We apologize to those of you who voted for the latter, but due to its airplane, corporate, and Middle Eastern references, 'Comfort Eagle' has been deemed inappropriate for today's emotional climate."

== Critical reception ==
Professional ratings
Aggregate scores
Source	Rating
Metacritic	70/100
Review scores
Source	Rating
AllMusic	3/5 stars
Alternative Press	4/5 stars
Blender	3/5 stars
Drowned in Sound	6/10
Entertainment Weekly	B−
PopMatters	7/10
Q	3/5 stars
Rolling Stone	3/5 stars
Uncut	4/5 stars

According to the review aggregator Metacritic, Comfort Eagle received "generally favorable reviews" based on a weighted average score of 70 out of 100 from 12 critic scores.

== Track listing ==
All tracks are written by John McCrea, unless otherwise noted.

No.	Title	Writer(s)	Length
1.	"Opera Singer"	McCrea, Mark Kornweibel	4:06
2.	"Meanwhile, Rick James..."		3:57
3.	"Shadow Stabbing"	McCrea, George Kane	3:07
4.	"Short Skirt/Long Jacket"		3:24
5.	"Commissioning a Symphony in C"		2:59
6.	"Arco Arena"		1:31
7.	"Comfort Eagle"		3:40
8.	"Long Line of Cars"		3:24
9.	"Love You Madly"		3:58
10.	"Pretty Pink Ribbon"		3:08
11.	"World of Two"		3:41
Total length:			36:55

== Personnel ==
Cake

- John McCrea – lead vocals, acoustic & electric guitars, keyboards, bass, drum programming, percussion
- Vince DiFiore – trumpet, keyboards, backing vocals
- Xan McCurdy – electric guitar, percussion, backing vocals
- Gabriel Nelson – bass guitar, keyboards, backing vocals
- Todd Roper – drums, percussion, Moog synthesizer, backing vocals

Guest musician

- Tyler Pope – keyboards, electric guitar ("Opera Singer", "Short Skirt/Long Jacket", "Arco Arena")

Production

- Cake – production, arrangements, mixing
- Kirt Shearer – mixing
- David Cole – mixing
- Craig Long – mixing
- Gabriel Shepard – mixing
- Don C. Taylor – mastering

== Charts ==
Album

Year	Chart	Position
2001	Billboard 200	13
2001	Top Internet Albums	2

Year-end

Year-end chart performance for Comfort Eagle
Chart (2001)	Position
Canadian Albums (Nielsen SoundScan)	151

Single

Year	Single	Chart	Position
2001	"Short Skirt/Long Jacket"	Modern Rock Tracks	7

== Certifications ==
Region	Certification	Certified units/sales
Canada (Music Canada)	Gold	50,000^{^}
United States (RIAA)	Platinum	1,000,000^{‡}
^{^} Shipments figures based on certification alone.^{‡} Sales+streaming figures based on certification alone.

== In other media ==
- An instrumental version of "Short Skirt/Long Jacket" was used as the opening theme to Chuck.
