= John Lee Hooker Jr. =

American blues singer and minister (born 1952)

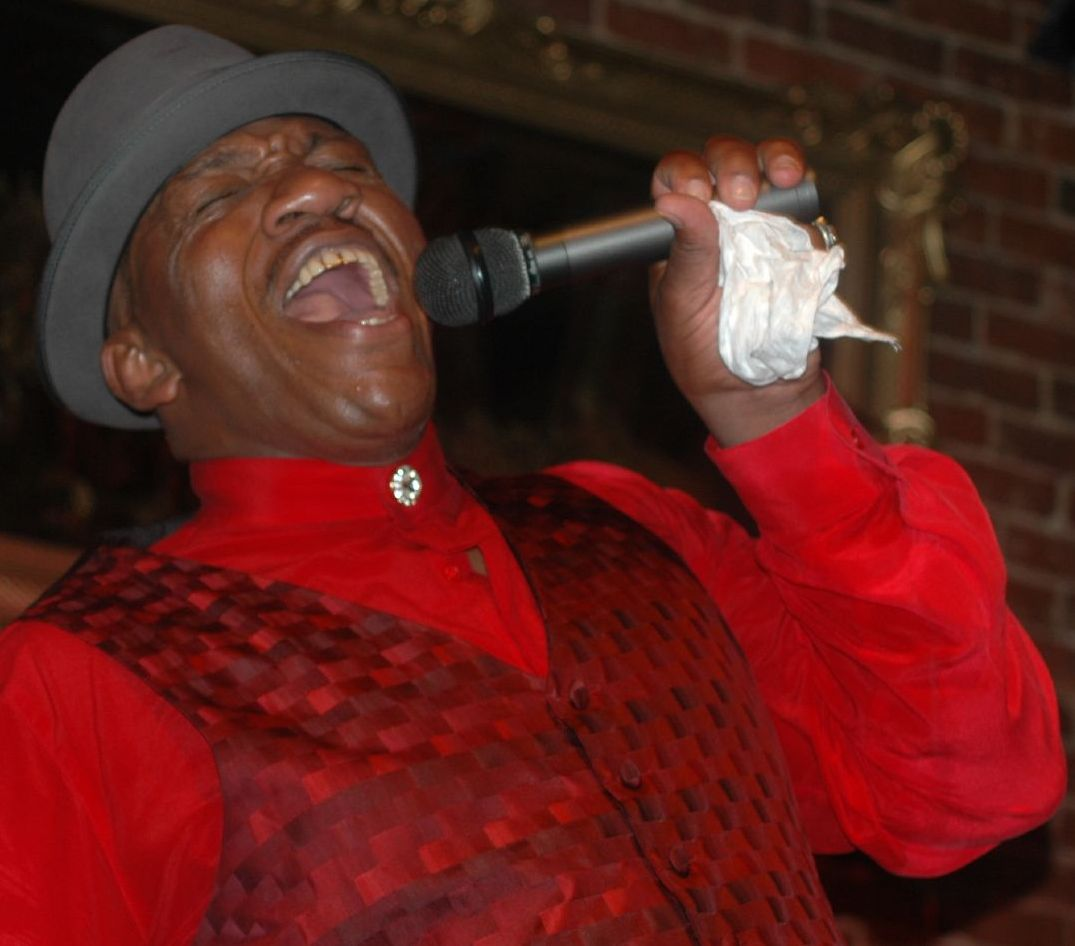
- Hooker in Auburn, Maine, 2006

Background information
- Born: January 15, 1952 (age 74); Detroit, Michigan, U.S.
- Genres: Blues; gospel
- Occupations: Singer; minister
- Years active: 2004–present
- Labels: Kent Music; Telarc; Steppin' Stone; CC Entertainment; Sound and More; Hermes
- Father: John Lee Hooker
- Website: johnleehookerjr.com

John Lee Hooker Jr. (born January 15, 1952) is an American blues singer and Christian minister. The son of influential blues singer John Lee Hooker (1917–2001), his musical style takes a modern departure from the music of his father, featuring contemporary arrangements.

== Biography ==
John Lee Hooker Jr. was born on January 15, 1952, in Detroit, Michigan, to Maude Ellas (née Mathis) and John Lee Hooker. He had five siblings and two step siblings; his younger brother is the musician Robert Hooker.

Hooker was performing live on local radio stations by the time he was eight years old and toured with his father as a teenager. He struggled with drugs and alcohol for several years before reviving his career with his debut solo album, Blues with a Vengeance, in 2004. The album was nominated for a Grammy Award. A follow-up album, Cold as Ice, was released in 2006.

Hooker's third album, All Odds Against Me, was released on August 19, 2008. Marking a clear departure from his father's style of music, the album was nominated for a Grammy Award that year in the category Best Traditional Blues CD. An animated video for the song, "Blues Ain't Nothin' But a Pimp", produced by the Paris-based studio Callicore, featured Hooker as a street-hardened character known as "Bluesman". The video was a 2009 Webby Award honoree for special effects.

Hooker's 2008 touring band included George Lacson (bass), Jeff Horan (guitar), Mike Rogers (drums), and Gig Anderson (keyboards).

Now an ordained minister, he is now reaching out to those in prisons (including at the prison he was an inmate during his drug-abuse years) and is currently raising funds through his Kickstarter webpage in order to finish his recording and eventual release of his first contemporary soul gospel album using similar blues and funk elements from his blues releases and concerts. On his Kickstarter page, Hooker also gives a brief video biography of himself leading up to his conversion to Christianity.

Before becoming a minister, he was featured in an episode of The 700 Club, where he detailed his drug addictions and imprisonment leading up to sobriety and his conversion to Christianity.

== Discography ==
=== Studio albums ===
- Blues With a Vengeance (Kent Music, 2004)
- Cold as Ice (Telarc, 2006)
- All Odds Against Me (Steppin' Stone / CC Entertainment, 2008)
- All Hooked Up (Steppin' Stone / CC Entertainment, 2012)
- That's What the Blues Is All About (Sound and More Studios / Hermes Management, 2012) – with Daddy's Cash
- Testify (Steppin' Stone / CC Entertainment, 2020)

=== Live albums ===
- Live In Istanbul, Turkey (Steppin' Stone / CC Entertainment, 2010)
