= Motorcade of Generosity =

Studio album by Cake
- Released: February 7, 1994
- Recorded: 1993
- Studio: Pus Cavern, Sacramento, CA
- Genre: Alternative rock; alternative country; experimental rock; lo-fi
- Length: 43:12
- Label: Capricorn
- Producer: Cake

Cake chronology
Motorcade of Generosity (1994)	Fashion Nugget (1996)

Singles from Motorcade of Generosity
- 1. "Rock 'n' Roll Lifestyle" Released: 1993; 2. "Jolene" Released: 1995; 3. "Ruby Sees All" Released: 1995

Motorcade of Generosity is the debut studio album by American alternative rock band Cake. It was recorded at the Pus Cavern studio in Sacramento, California, and released through Capricorn Records on February 7, 1994.

According to Pitchfork reviewer Madison Bloom, Motorcade of Geneoristy is a lo-fi album with "warm and close" songs that pull from different musical styles, such as honky-tonk and ranchera, and compared its style to "trailing notes down a stairwell into some subterranean tavern, where a cantina band plays over clinking pints." Music critic Daryl Cater deemed it an example of funky, guitar-oriented "quirk-rock" reminiscent of Phish's "genre-hopping jams".

== Release ==
On January 14, 2009, a limited edition orange vinyl re-issue of the album was made available for purchase on the band's official website. It sold out in two days.

The single "Rock 'n' Roll Lifestyle" was first played by KWOD (now known as KUDL). Only 500 copies were issued. The song was used for an Ikea advertisement in Sweden. The music video for this song was filmed at Safetyville USA in Sacramento.

== Reception ==
Professional ratings
Review scores
Source	Rating
AllMusic	2/5 stars
Chicago Tribune	2/4 stars
Robert Christgau	(1-star Honorable Mention)
MusicOMH	3.5/5 stars
NME	7/10
Rolling Stone	3.5/5 stars

The album has received a mixed-to-favorable response from critics. AllMusic critic Darryl Cater stated that "Cake's minimalist jams occasionally get repetitive", though he concluded that "there are enough standouts here to easily qualify Motorcade as a keeper." Music reviewer Robert Christgau described the album as "unambiguity from the near side of cool."

== Legacy ==
In 2005, the song "I Bombed Korea" was translated into Hebrew and performed by Zeev Tene under the title "Beirut" (Hebrew: ביירות), with "Korea" replaced by "Sidon" and "Beirut" in the lyrics. This version was included on the soundtrack of the film Waltz with Bashir (2008).

== Track listing ==
All tracks are written by John McCrea, except as indicated.

No.	Title	Writer(s)	Length
1.	"Comanche"		2:09
2.	"Ruby Sees All"	McCrea; Jim Campilongo	3:00
3.	"Up So Close"		3:13
4.	"Pentagram"		2:19
5.	"Jolene"	McCrea; Greg Brown	5:19
6.	"Haze of Love"		3:08
7.	"You Part the Waters"		2:50
8.	"Is This Love?"	McCrea; Brown	3:19
9.	"Jesus Wrote a Blank Check"		3:10
10.	"Rock 'n' Roll Lifestyle"		4:14
11.	"I Bombed Korea"		2:19
12.	"Mr. Mastodon Farm"	McCrea; Brown	5:27
13.	"Ain't No Good"		2:40

== Personnel ==
Cake

- John McCrea – vocals, guitar
- Greg Brown – guitar, organ
- Vince DiFiore – trumpet
- Victor Damiani – bass
- Todd Roper – drums

Guest musicians

- Frank French – drums on tracks 5, 8, 10, 11
- Gabriel Nelson – bass on tracks 5, 8, 10, 11
- Hag – extra backing vocals

Production

- Cake – production
- Joe Johnston – engineering
- Mark Pollock – special assistance

== Chart ==
"Rock 'n' Roll Lifestyle"
Year	Chart	Position
1995	Modern Rock Tracks (US)	31
