= Fashion Nugget =

Studio album by Cake
- Released: September 17, 1996
- Recorded: 1995–1996
- Genres: Alternative rock; funk rock; alternative country; Latin rock
- Length: 48:36
- Label: Capricorn
- Producer: Cake

Cake chronology
Motorcade of Generosity (1994)	Fashion Nugget (1996)	Prolonging the Magic (1998)

Singles from Fashion Nugget
- 1. "The Distance" Released: August 5, 1996; 2. "I Will Survive" Released: 1997; 3. "Frank Sinatra" Released: 1997; 4. "Perhaps, Perhaps, Perhaps" Released: 1997; 5. "Friend Is a Four Letter Word" Released: March 3, 1998

Professional ratings
Review scores
Source	Rating
AllMusic	3.5/5 stars
Chicago Tribune	2.5/4 stars
Christgau's Consumer Guide	(2-star Honorable Mention)
In Music We Trust	A
The New Rolling Stone Album Guide	3.5/5 stars
NME	6/10
Pitchfork	7.8/10
Sputnikmusic	4.5/5
The Sydney Morning Herald	4/5 stars
The Virgin Encyclopedia of Nineties Music	2/5 stars

Fashion Nugget is the second studio album by alternative rock band Cake. It was released in 1996, and contains 14 songs. "The Distance" and "I Will Survive" became the most successful singles on the record, with the former peaking at number 22 in the UK and at number 4 on the US Alternative Airplay Chart. The album was recorded at Paradise Studios in Sacramento, California.

On December 9, 1996, the album was certified gold by the RIAA, and the next year, the album was certified platinum for shipments of one million copies.

In 2026, Fashion Nugget was ranked No. 45 on Consequence's list of the top 60 albums of 1996.

== Style ==
The album contains elements of alternative rock, rock, funk, hip-hop, rockabilly, jazz, country, pop rock, folk rock, and Latin music.

== Track listing ==
All tracks are written by John McCrea, except where noted.

Fashion Nugget track listing
No.	Title	Writer(s)	Length
1.	"Frank Sinatra"		4:01
2.	"The Distance"	Greg Brown	3:00
3.	"Friend Is a Four Letter Word"		3:22
4.	"Open Book"	Brown, McCrea	3:44
5.	"Daria"		3:44
6.	"Race Car Ya-Yas"	Cake	1:21
7.	"I Will Survive"	Freddie Perren, Dino Fekaris	5:10
8.	"Stickshifts and Safetybelts"		2:09
9.	"Perhaps, Perhaps, Perhaps"	Osvaldo Farrés, Joe Davis	2:24
10.	"It's Coming Down"		3:44
11.	"Nugget"	Cake	3:58
12.	"She'll Come Back to Me"		2:24
13.	"Italian Leather Sofa"		5:52
14.	"Sad Songs and Waltzes"	Willie Nelson	3:15

== Personnel ==
Cake

- John McCrea – vocals, acoustic guitar, organ
- Greg Brown – electric guitar, organ
- Vince DiFiore – trumpet, percussion
- Victor Damiani – bass guitar
- Todd Roper – drums, percussion

Guest musician

- Greg Vincent – pedal steel guitar on "She'll Come Back to Me"

Additional personnel

- Cake – production
- Craig Long – engineering
- Kirt Shearer – engineering
- Joe Johnston – engineering
- Scott Reams – assistant engineer
- Larry Hulst – band photo
- John McCrea – design
- Mark Kornweibel – design
- Audrey Marie – design

== Appearances in other media ==
- The Daria episode "The Road Worrier" featured the song "Frank Sinatra". The song "Daria" was used as closing credits for "The New Kid" and "Friend Is a Four-Letter Word" was the closing credit theme of episode 13 of season 4 : "Dye! Dye! My Darling".
- The song "Frank Sinatra" was also featured at the close of The Sopranos episode "The Legend of Tennessee Moltisanti".
- Cake's cover of "I Will Survive" was featured in the 1998 French film Those Who Love Me Can Take the Train, the 2004 Japanese movie Survive Style 5+, the 2002 film Secretary, the 2003 German movie "Herr Lehmann" and the 2003 Canadian comedy, Mambo Italiano.
- "Open Book" was featured on the soundtrack to the 2001 film Sidewalks of New York.
- "Stickshifts and Safetybelts" is featured in the film Waking Up in Reno.
- "Stickshifts and Safetybelts" was featured on the Las Vegas callback episode of Season 6 of So You Think You Can Dance.
- For two years, "The Distance" was used in the TV advert for the Powers Irish Grand National, a horse race which takes place in County Meath, Ireland every Easter Monday.
- "The Distance" was used in Episode 13 of Season 11 of The Simpsons, called "Saddlesore Galactica".
- Excerpts of "Stickshifts and Safetybelts" are often used as bumpers on The Splendid Table, which is produced by American Public Media and airs on public radio stations nationwide.
- The cover of "I Will Survive" and other songs from Fashion Nugget are used in the German film Herr Lehmann.
- An instrumental and uptempo version of the song "Italian Leather Sofa" plays over the opening credits of Mission Hill.
- "Perhaps, Perhaps, Perhaps" is featured on the soundtrack of the movies Dream for an Insomniac and Welcome to Woop Woop.
- The cover of "I Will Survive" was used in the Italian movie L'uomo in più (One man up).
- "Perhaps, Perhaps, Perhaps" was used in Snapple commercials
- "The Distance" was used in Amazon Echo commercials in 2015.
- PBS Kids used "The Distance" in a commercial for Maya & Miguel
- The cover of "I Will Survive" appears in The Click, a pilot for the MTV show Undergrads.
- A cover of "Friend is a Four Letter Word" was sung by the cast of Dear White People (season 4, episode 7).
- "Frank Sinatra" was used in episode 2 of Pepsi, Where's My Jet?
- "The Distance" was used in the episode "SHNGRLA" of Twisted Metal.

== Charts ==
=== Weekly charts ===
Weekly chart performance for Fashion Nugget
Chart (1996–1997)	Peak position
Australian Albums (ARIA)	9
Belgian Albums (Ultratop Wallonia)	40
Dutch Albums (Album Top 100)	71
French Albums (SNEP)	20
German Albums (Offizielle Top 100)	49
New Zealand Albums (RMNZ)	41
Norwegian Albums (VG-lista)	28
Scottish Albums (Official Charts)	79
UK Albums (Official Charts)	53
US Billboard 200	36
US Top Catalog Albums (Billboard)	48
US Heatseekers Albums (Billboard)	1

=== Year-end charts ===
Year-end chart performance for Fashion Nugget
Chart (1997)	Position
Australian Albums (ARIA)	69
US Billboard 200	80

== Certifications ==
Certifications for Fashion Nugget
Region	Certification	Certified units/sales
Australia (ARIA)	Gold	35,000^{^}
Canada (Music Canada)	Gold	50,000^{^}
United States (RIAA)	2× Platinum	2,000,000^{‡}
^{^} Shipments figures based on certification alone.^{‡} Sales+streaming figures based on certification alone.
