= Vince DiFiore =

American musician (born 1965)

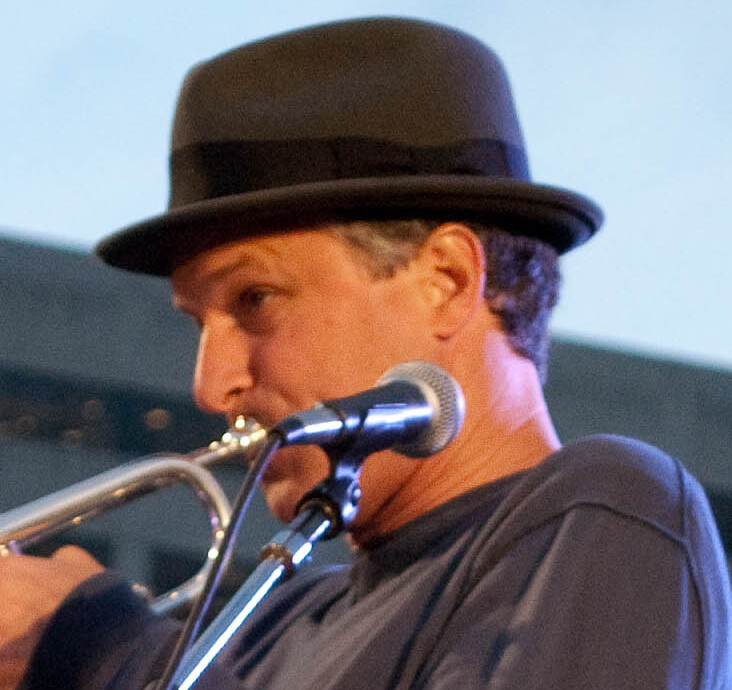
- DiFiore performing with Cake in 2009

Background information
- Born: Vincent Robert DiFiore Jr. 1965 (age 60–61); Torrance, California, U.S.
- Occupation: Musician
- Instruments: Trumpet; keyboards; vocals
- Member of: Cake

Vincent Robert DiFiore Jr. (born 1965 in Torrance, California) is an American musician. He has been a member of the band Cake since 1991, in which he plays trumpet and keyboards and sings backing vocals.

== Education ==
DiFiore earned a Bachelor of Arts in psychology from University of California, Los Angeles and a Master of Arts in psychology from California State University, Sacramento.

== Career ==
DiFiore is a founding member of Cake, along with John McCrea and Greg Brown, Shon Meckfessel, and Frank French. The band released their first album, Motorcade of Generosity, in 1994, and have since released five more.

Since 2019, DiFiore has been a member of the That, with whom he plays trumpet and keyboards, as well as singing accompanying vocals.
