= The Distance (Cake song) =

1996 single by Cake

Single by Cake

from the album Fashion Nugget
- Released: August 5, 1996
- Genre: Alternative rock; pop rock; rap rock
- Length: 3:00
- Label: Capricorn
- Songwriter: Greg Brown
- Producer: Cake

Cake singles chronology
"Ruby Sees All" (1995)	"The Distance" (1996)	"I Will Survive" (1997)

Music video
- "The Distance" on YouTube

"The Distance" is a song by American alternative rock band Cake. Released in August 1996, "The Distance" was the first single from the band's second album, Fashion Nugget, and is considered one of their most popular songs. It was written by the band's guitarist at the time, Greg Brown.

== Background ==
"It is a song about success and failure, and failure of success, really," said singer John McCrea in 2019. "It's a sad song, because there is no success. You can explode into the world with great magnificence, and still feel like the guy underneath the Mickey Mouse head, with the fan batteries that have stopped working properly, and it's dark under there, and everybody wants your autograph."

Brown wanted the guitar riff to be played throughout the entire song, but singer McCrea felt it should be saved for the chorus.

== Composition ==
The song is based around Cake's standard guitar, bass, and drums setup, with flourishes of solo trumpet, and McCrea's characteristically deadpan, driving vocals. The song does not employ McCrea's rhythm guitar, but does feature overlaid synthesized and other non-traditional sounds.

== Music video ==
The video for "The Distance" features footage of the members of the band performing the song in a busy office lobby, mixed with footage of a businessman who inexplicably starts to run off into the sunset; first he runs from his office building (the same one the band is performing in) to the suburbs, then into the country and a forest, and finally into the sea. While the man is running, various people in humorous animal costumes cheer him on. It takes place in downtown San Francisco and other Northern California locations and first aired in September 1996.

== Track listing ==
1. "The Distance" – 3:00
2. "Multiply the Heartaches" – 2:49
3. "Jolene" (live) – 8:25
4. "It's Coming Down" – 3:44

== Personnel ==
- Greg Brown – words, guitar, backing vocals
- Victor Damiani – bass, backing vocals
- Vincent DiFiore – trumpet, melodica, backing vocals
- John McCrea – lead vocals, organ
- Todd Roper – drums, percussion, and backing vocals

== Charts ==
=== Weekly charts ===
Chart (1996)	Peak position
Australia (ARIA)	21
Belgium (Ultratip Bubbling Under Flanders)	15
Canada Rock/Alternative (RPM)	5
Netherlands (Single Top 100)	73
Scottish Singles Sales (Official Charts)	20
UK Singles (Official Charts)	22
US Radio Songs (Billboard)	35
US Alternative Airplay (Billboard)	4
US Mainstream Rock (Billboard)	38

=== Year-end charts ===
Chart (1996)	Position
US Modern Rock Tracks (Billboard)	77

== Certifications ==
Region	Certification	Certified units/sales
New Zealand (RMNZ)	Platinum	30,000^{‡}
United States (RIAA)	2× Platinum	2,000,000^{‡}
^{‡} Sales+streaming figures based on certification alone.

== In popular culture ==
- The song's opening lyric, "Reluctantly crouched at the starting line", is prominently featured in the remix "The Starting Line" by Neil Cicierega on his album Mouth Moods.
- The song is also heard in the season 1 Daria episode, "The Invitation".
- The song is heard in the opening of episode 10 "SHNGRLA" in season 1 of Twisted Metal.
- The song is used in the Blue Stars Drum and Bugle Corps 2025 Production "Spectator Sport".
