= Greg Brown (rock musician) =

American guitarist (1970–2026)

Gregory Paul Brown (January 3, 1970 – February 5, 2026) was an American guitarist and founding member of the band Cake. He may be best known for writing one of Cake's biggest hits, their 1996 single "The Distance".

== Life and career ==
Brown was born in Sacramento, California, on January 3, 1970. He played on the Cake albums Motorcade of Generosity and Fashion Nugget before leaving the band in 1998 prior to the recording of Prolonging the Magic. That album's liner notes indicate that some of his guitar arrangements were used. During his years as Cake's guitar player, Brown primarily used a 1965 Guild Starfire III run through a Pro Co RAT distortion pedal into a Silvertone amp. Brown wrote or co-wrote several songs on Cake's first two albums, including their most popular single "The Distance".

After Cake, he joined Deathray, a band where he provided backing vocals and lead guitar. He also wrote four songs and co-penned two more for their 2000 debut album, which was released on Capricorn Records and then re-released on Doppler Records. He also joined the side project of Weezer singer-songwriter Rivers Cuomo, Homie. In 2003, he played piano and guitar and co-produced Puckett's Versus the Country Boy, an EP by Matt Sharp, formerly of Weezer and The Rentals. Deathray recorded their second album (Believe Me) in late 2004 and early 2005, on which Brown performed guitar, backing vocals, and other instruments. Believe Me was released via download later in 2005, and a few copies were available in CD format despite the band not being signed to any label. He also co-produced the debut album from Golden Shoulders with Deathray bandmate Victor Damiani, and played guitar on Friendship is Deep, the second album from Golden Shoulders released on label, Doppler Records. Brown played guitar on "Bound Away" from Cake's 2011 album, Showroom of Compassion, which was his first appearance on a Cake album since 1996's Fashion Nugget.

After his days in Cake and Deathray, he crafted a solo EP, published on June 6, 2023.

Brown died on February 5, 2026, at the age of 56, following an unspecified brief illness.
