= Upbeat Records =

- Founded: 2007
- Founder: Cake
- Genre: Alternative
- Country of origin: U.S.
- Location: Sacramento, California

Upbeat Records is an independent record label that releases the work of Cake.

== History ==
Originally, Columbia Records requested that Cake release a greatest hits compilation, but the band promptly refused. During the legal fall-out, Cake formed its own record label and released B-Sides and Rarities.
