= Cake (band) =

American rock band

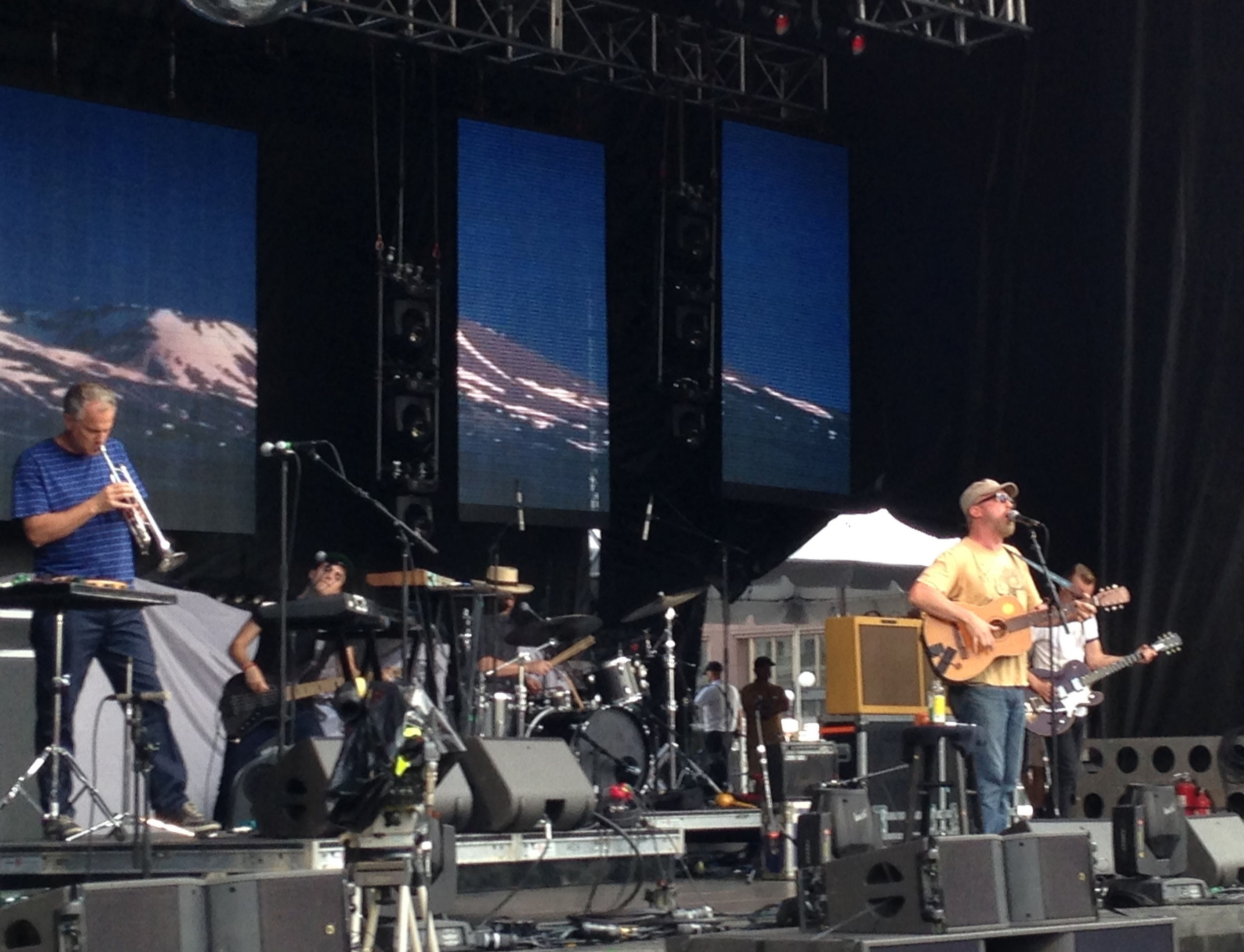
- Cake playing at the Incuya Music Festival in Cleveland, Ohio, on August 26, 2018

Background information
- Origin: Sacramento, California, U.S.
- Genres: Alternative rock; country; indie rock; funk rock
- Works: Cake discography
- Years active: 1991–present
- Labels: Capricorn; Columbia; Upbeat
- Members: John McCrea; Vince DiFiore; Xan McCurdy; Todd Roper; Daniel McCallum
- Past members: See members section
- Website: cakemusic.com

Cake (stylized as CAKE) is an American rock band from Sacramento, California, consisting of singer John McCrea, trumpeter/keyboardist Vince DiFiore, guitarist Xan McCurdy, bassist Daniel McCallum, and drummer Todd Roper. The band has been through many lineup changes but in all of them McCrea and DiFiore have been consistently in the band since the start. The band has also been noted for McCrea's droll sarcastic lyrics and deadpan vocals, and their wide-ranging musical influences, including norteño, country music, mariachi, disco, rock, funk, folk music, and hip-hop.

Cake was formed in August of 1991 by McCrea, DiFiore, Greg Brown (guitar), Frank French (drums), and Shon Meckfessel (bass) who soon left and was replaced by Gabe Nelson. Following the self-release of its debut album, Motorcade of Generosity, the band was signed to Capricorn Records in 1995 and released its first single, "Rock 'n' Roll Lifestyle", which hit number 35 on the Modern Rock Tracks music chart and was featured on MTV's 120 Minutes; French and Nelson then left the band, and were replaced by Todd Roper and Victor Damiani. Cake's second album, 1996's Fashion Nugget, went platinum on the strength of its lead single, "The Distance". Following a tour of Europe and the United States, both Brown and Damiani announced they were leaving Cake, which led to speculation about the band's future; McCrea eventually recruited Xan McCurdy to take over on guitar, and persuaded Nelson to return.

Prolonging the Magic, the band's third album, was released in 1998 and went platinum, having shipped over one million units featuring the single "Never There" which hit number 1 on the Modern Rock Tracks chart; this was followed three years later by Comfort Eagle, the band's first album on Columbia Records, featuring the single "Short Skirt/Long Jacket" which hit number 7 on the Modern Rock Tracks chart. Following a series of tours, including several versions of the Unlimited Sunshine Tour, the band released Pressure Chief in 2004, its second and last album on Columbia. After creating its own label, Upbeat Records, the band released Showroom of Compassion in 2011, which became its first album to debut at the top of the Billboard charts, selling 44,000 copies in the first week after release. Their studio output has been minimal since 2011, although they have continued to tour and have occasionally hinted at an upcoming album.

== History ==
=== Formation and Motorcade of Generosity (1991–1996) ===
Cake was formed in 1991 when John McCrea, a Sacramento, California native who had moved to Los Angeles with a band only to see it "quickly crumble around him", returned to Sacramento. He began looking for a new band to play with, having "grown tired of Sacramento's coffeehouse circuit", and quickly attracted trumpet player Vince DiFiore, guitarist Greg Brown, bassist Shon Meckfessel, and drummer Frank French. All were active in the music scene at the time; DiFiore notes that "[McCrea] came back and stole us from other bands". The band soon came up with the name "Cake"; rather than referring to the food, the name is meant to be "like when something insidiously becomes a part of your life...[we] mean it more as something that cakes onto your shoe and is just sort of there until you get rid of it". They have also stated that they "liked the phonetic punch of the word." Meckfessel soon left to attend college and was replaced by Gabe Nelson. After touring and becoming part of the club scene in San Francisco, the band independently recorded and released Motorcade of Generosity in 1994, selling copies from their van as a method of paying touring expenses.

Motorcade was named one of the best indie releases of 1994 by Pulse!, and after a concert at the Great American Music Hall, Bonnie Simmons agreed to manage the band, leading to them signing a deal with Capricorn Records, who re-released the album in 1995. The first single, "Rock 'n' Roll Lifestyle", hit number 35 on the Modern Rock Tracks music chart and was featured on MTV's 120 Minutes. Critical reactions to the album were largely positive; Stephen Thompson in the Wisconsin State Journal described it as possessing "great lyrics, creative instrumentation and production that's about as simple as production gets", Thomas Conner praised it for being "soulful and smooth, witty and gritty, this record makes the ghosts of Bob Wills, Buddy Holly and Lou Reed smile" in the Tulsa World, and Matt Weitz in the Dallas Observer noted its "gimlet eye and sardonic humor". The album was eventually nominated for a Bammy Award in the category of "Outstanding Debut Album".

Nevertheless, some critics were less appreciative; John Wirt, in The Advocate, praised the album's sense of humor and "delicious" irreverence but noted that "[the] musicianship in Motorcade of Generosity suggests the Cake guys are mediocre players". Mindy LaBernz, in The Austin Chronicle, described the album as "cover-free, and, since we're on the subject, genre-free. A quartet made five by a trumpet player, Cake carry themselves with the snittiness of technically proficient, lyrically aware music lovers, who are almost anachronistically untrendy and brazenly proud of it". The signing to Capricorn and re-release of Motorcade led to both French and Nelson leaving the band, citing their dislike of "the prospect of extensive national touring"; they were replaced by Todd Roper and Victor Damiani, respectively.

=== Fashion Nugget (1996–1998) ===
Fashion Nugget, Cake's second album, was released on 17 September 1996. Like Motorcade, it was produced by the band and released on Capricorn Records. Cake considered the album more professionally produced than Motorcade, despite references to its "raw" sound, and the reception was again generally positive; critics noted the broadening of Cake's sound, with Joshua Green noting in the Westword that "Nugget spans a broader range of topics than did Motorcade, with similarly appealing results", and Matt Weitz in the Dallas Observer saying that "The gimlet eye and sardonic humor of 1994's Motorcade of Generosity is intact, but Fashion Nugget is aptly named; it updates Motorcade with beatboxy soul and hip-hop rhythms". The album's first single, "The Distance", written by Greg Brown, became the band's biggest hit to date and is considered their "ubiquitous" song; it hit number 5 on the RPM Alternative 30, and entered the Modern Rock Tracks top 5.

On the strength of "The Distance", Fashion Nugget was certified gold on December 9, 1996 and platinum on April 10, 1997. The second single from Fashion Nugget, a cover of the Freddie Perren and Dino Fekaris song "I Will Survive", hit number 38 on the US Modern Rock Tracks chart. Although the band described it as a serious take on the original, one they'd been playing live for years, original performer Gloria Gaynor considers it her least favorite version of the song due to its use of profanity. Following Fashion Nugget's release, the band toured the United States, playing in cities including Tulsa, Chicago, Salt Lake City, Los Angeles, San Antonio, and Dallas. They later toured overseas, visiting the United Kingdom as a support act for Counting Crows, playing their own shows alongside the tour at venues including Dingwalls in London. The band also toured Japan; a later tour of the US, starting in Minneapolis in June 1997, was cancelled due to illness when McCrea was diagnosed with "fatigue and extreme exhaustion". After McCrea recovered, the band continued touring, playing at the Big Stink festival in Estacada, Oregon, and the Jayhawk Music Festival in Lawrence, Kansas.

1997 also saw lineup changes; bassist Victor Damiani and guitarist Greg Brown both left, prompting speculation about the band's survival; McCrea noted that "Musically, there was a really great symbiosis and I really felt that it (their departures, especially Brown's) was the most stupid thing in the world", and said that he had considered dissolving the band. Damiani and McCrea have not been on good terms ever since his departure. Brown and Damiani formed the "new-wave influenced" Deathray; their places within Cake were taken by Xan McCurdy and Gabe Nelson, whom McCrea persuaded to rejoin the band.

=== Prolonging the Magic (1998–2001) ===
With Brown and Damiani's departure, McCrea felt "free to experiment" with the next album, 1998's Prolonging the Magic; he wrote and produced every song. As a result of this experimentation, the album was noted as "loaded with spiced-up instrumentation, including a few new ingredients like the pedal steel guitar and musical saw thrown in for extra flavour". McCrea stated that he deliberately "approached writing this record without the guitar as the central assumption of all life in the universe". Music Week described it as an "inspired collection of leftfield rock", while Thor Christensen of The Dallas Morning News said that it "brims with the same dry humor the Sacramento band displayed in past hits such as 'The Distance' and 'Rock and Roll Lifestyle': The leadoff track, 'Satan Is My Motor', puts a devilish new spin on the rock 'n' roll car-song tradition, while 'When You Sleep' revolves around the question of what your fingers do while the rest of the body snoozes". Other reviewers were less complimentary, with Mike Pattenden in The Times writing that "Prolonging the Magic suggests that [Cake] may well be destined to go down as one-hit wonders ... While a handful stand out – the country waltz 'Mexico', 'You Turn the Screws' and 'Hem of Your Garment' – 'Prolonging the Magic' shows McRea and company to be little more than an above average bar-room act. Cake are surviving on songwriting crumbs". The album peaked at number 33 on the Billboard 200, was listed in The Columbian as the second best album of 1998, and eventually went platinum after shipping over 1 million units.

The album's first single, "Never There", hit number 1 on Billboard's Modern Rock Tracks chart, and was followed by "Let Me Go" in 1999, which hit number 30. Following Prolonging the Magic's release, the band toured the United States, playing in cities including San Diego and Los Angeles. A tour of Europe was temporarily postponed in March after McCrea broke a bone in his hand while moving furniture, which also led to the delay of the European release of Prolonging the Magic. Both the album release and the tour happened in mid-April, with Cake playing at the London Astoria. Later show locations in North America included Chicago, St. Louis, Missouri, and Toronto. A third single, "Sheep Go to Heaven", was released in 2001.

=== Comfort Eagle (2001–2004) ===
For their fourth album, Comfort Eagle, the band signed a deal with Columbia Records. Comfort Eagle was both produced and arranged by the band, and was recorded at Paradise Studios in Sacramento and Hyde Street Studios in San Francisco. Following the recording, drummer Todd Roper left the band, citing the demands extended touring would put on his time, and the commitments his two children represented. He was replaced by Pete McNeal. The album's release was preceded by the release of its first single, "Short Skirt/Long Jacket", described as a parable about "the relationship between prosperity and the population boom ... There's nothing more procreational than economic prosperity". An accompanying video was directed by McCrea, and recorded using the DV system; it featured vox populi recordings of members of the public listening to the song and giving their opinion. "Short Skirt/Long Jacket" hit number 2 on the Bear Rock Top 10 in Canada and number 7 on the Billboard Modern Rock Tracks; the video became one of the 30 most requested tracks on MTV; Billboard writers later listed the video as the 5th best of 2001.

Comfort Eagle itself was released on July 24, 2001, to good reviews; Michael D. Clark of The Houston Chronicle described it as "Cake at its best", while a reviewer for The Atlanta Journal-Constitution stated that the album's songs were "among the best of the band's career", praising McCrea for widening his vocal repertoire. James Montgomery, writing for UWIRE, noted a stylistic change, saying that "While the core sound of the band – honky tonk guitars, mariachi horns and salsa rhythms – remain intact, they have been stripped down to the core, replaced instead with ill Casio beats, rubbery funk and Stax-style horn bleats". The album sold ~72,000" copies in its first week, the highest sales in the band's history, and eventually went gold. With the exception of a slot at the Atlanta On The Bricks Festival, playing for 90,000 people, the band chose to start the tour with small rather than large shows, such as in the Sacramento area, where they played for around 100 people. They launched their first full tour for the album in September, playing in the United States, Canada, and across Europe.

A second single, "Love You Madly", was released in 2002, with an accompanying video again produced by McCrea. The video featured DiFiore and McNeal competing in a cooking competition, judged by Rick James, Phyllis Diller, and Jeff Smith, and was noted by Billboard as "continuing the fresh, witty, and downright fun style seen in the "Short Skirt" video". Cake had planned a second tour of Europe, followed by a series of shows around the United States, but in view of the September 11 attacks chose not to travel overseas. Instead, the band streamed a performance internationally from the Yahoo! headquarters in California, playing emailed requests. The United States tour went ahead as planned, with Cake playing concerts in Birmingham, Alabama, St. Petersburg, Florida, Salt Lake City, and Las Vegas. This was followed by the Unlimited Sunshine Tour, a traveling festival headlined and planned by the band and featuring Modest Mouse, De La Soul, and the Flaming Lips. A second Unlimited Sunshine Tour was undertaken in 2003, featuring Cake, Cheap Trick, and the Hackensaw Boys.

=== Pressure Chief / B-Sides and Rarities (2004–2011) ===
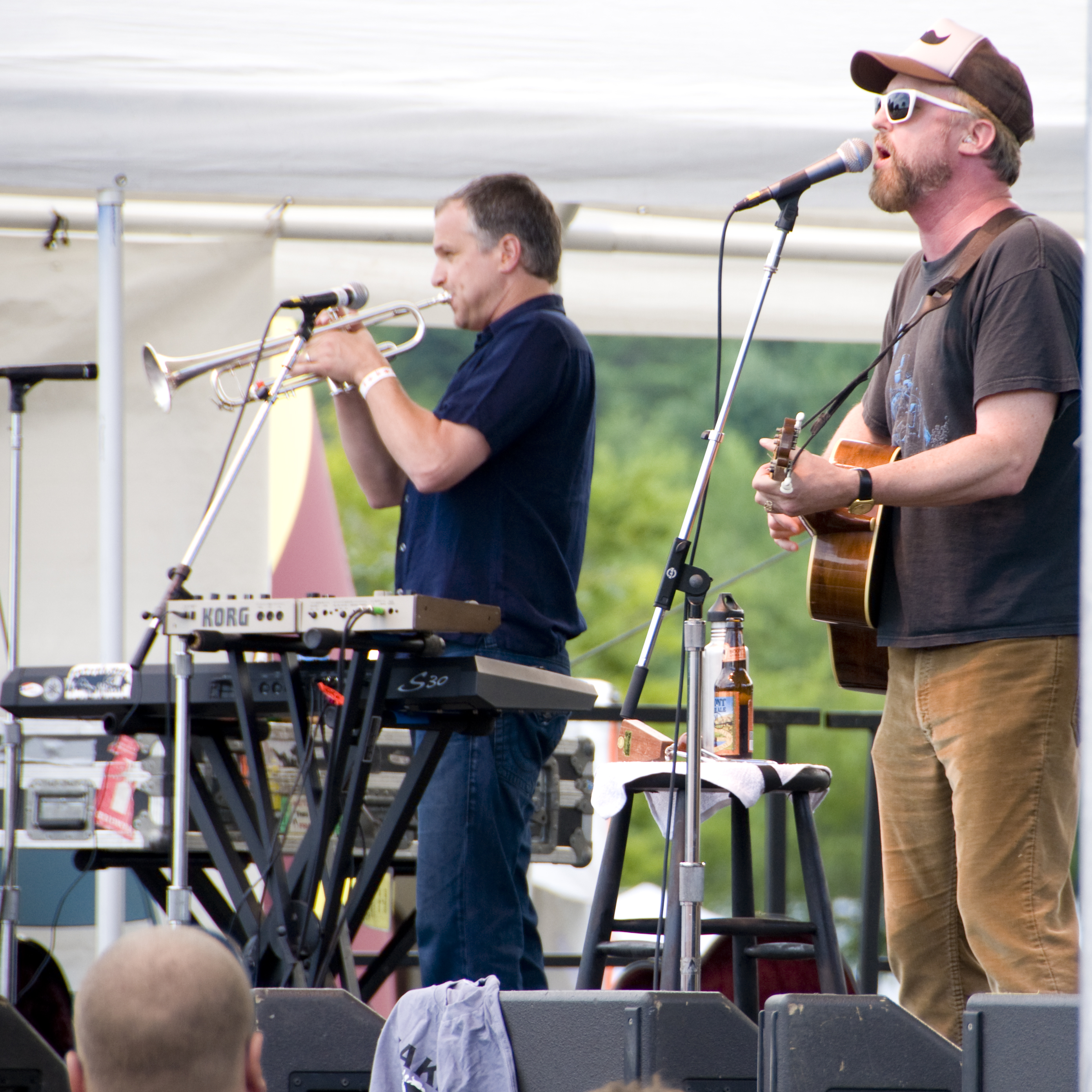
Cake performing in 2010

Cake's fifth album, Pressure Chief, was recorded in June 2004 in a converted house in Sacramento; the album was again released on Columbia Records. Before its official release date on October 5, the band played at the Austin City Limits Music Festival and KBCO's World Class Rockfest. The album was also preceded by its first single, "No Phone", which hit number 13 on Billboard's Modern Rock Tracks chart; the song covered the ubiquitous and privacy-invading use of cell phones, and was described by Jeremy Mahadevan of the New Straits Times as "a traditionally minimalist Cake anthem, with a killer melody and, unique to this album, fairly extensive use of synths". A second single, "Wheels", was also released but failed to chart. Pressure Chief itself hit number 17 on the Billboard top 200, spending seven weeks in the charts, and received mixed reviews from critics. Although it was acknowledged as a continuation of their old work, albeit with an increased use of synthesisers, Sam Spies of the Richmond Times-Dispatch noted that "the experiments in style that made Cake fun to listen to have all but disappeared from 'Pressure Chief' ... What's left is mostly uninspired, so-called alternative rock", and Graeme Hammond of the Sunday Herald Sun wrote that "the melodies are listless, the album bereft of anything with the verve of Short Skirt/Long Jacket or Comfort Eagle".

Other critics were more generous; Doug Elfman of the Las Vegas Review-Journal called it "another great and bizarre, twangy album of alternative-singer-songwriting stories about cars and horrible relationships", while a reviewer in the New Straits Times noted its "smart, subtly dissident, and always catchy pop". Following Pressure Chief's release, the band toured North America, playing in cities including Albany, New York, and Montreal. A second tour, in 2005, saw the band headline the 20-city Virgin College Mega Tour, playing alongside Gomez; while the tour was in California, the band announced that it had been dropped from Columbia Records. This was followed by a tour of Europe, as well as concerts in Australia and Jakarta, along with a 2006 repeat of the Unlimited Sunshine Tour, featuring Cake, Tegan and Sara, and Gogol Bordello.

On August 10, 2004, Cake performed at Buck Owens Crystal Palace in Bakersfield California to celebrate Buck Owens' 75th birthday, along with The Mavericks. Cake had previously covered and performed several Buck Owens songs.

Cake later formed its own label, Upbeat Records, which allowed the band to release the compilation album B-Sides and Rarities on August 14, 2007. This was followed by a series of concerts, including at the IndigO2 in London, and a performance in Anchorage, Alaska. Reviews of B-Sides and Rarities were generally good; Devin Grant of The Post and Courier wrote that "For an album full of odds and ends, this Cake release is every bit as good, and every bit as fun, as the band's previous studio releases", while Catherine P. Lewis of The Washington Post noted that, although several live tracks reduced the album's strength, "there are still enough charming nuggets to make this album less disposable than the typical rarities compilation".

=== Showroom of Compassion (2010–2011) ===
After six years without a studio album, Cake recorded Showroom of Compassion in 2010 and released it on 11 January 2011. Rather than having it professionally recorded, the band built their own solar-powered studio in Sacramento over five years and chose to produce the album themselves there. The album was preceded by its first single, "Sick of You", which was released in September 2010, hitting number 4 on the Billboard Alternative Songs chart. The album debuted at number 1 on the Billboard 200 Albums chart, selling 44,000 copies in its first week of release. It marked the first time a Cake album had hit the number 1 spot, and at the time was the lowest sales numbers for album at the top of the Billboard 200.

The album received mostly positive reviews. Scott Bergen of The Record described it as "one of their best albums", while Jim Farber of the Daily News wrote that "Fifteen years after they batted out their first left-field hit with 'The Distance,' the band's sound and words still have bite". George Lang of The Oklahoman, however, wrote that it was "frustratingly lacking in many more songs worthy of the band's late-'90s boom period". To promote the album, Cake performed on Late Night with Jimmy Fallon and The Tonight Show with Jay Leno before releasing Showroom of Compassion's second single, "Long Time". This was followed by a spring tour of both Europe and North America, concluding with a show in Toronto on May 21. The song "Long Time" was also played in season 1 episode 12 of Showtime's series Shameless.

On 26 February 2011, Cake performed a live set for "Guitar Center Sessions" on DirecTV. The episode included an interview with program host Nic Harcourt. In September 2011, Cake released a 24-page, hand-made visual book for their song, "Bound Away".

=== Later history (2011–present) ===
The band released a vinyl box set consisting of their six studio albums, their rarities album, and the previously unreleased Live from the Crystal Palace for Record Store Day 2014. A new studio album was announced for an early 2014 release, although in September 2014, McCrea admitted they hadn't yet begun to record a new album. In fall 2015, bassist Gabe Nelson and drummer Paulo Baldi left the band. In summer 2016, Todd Roper rejoined the group as drummer. Daniel McCallum and Casey Lipka have both played as bassist during live performances since 2016.

On August 3, 2018, Cake released "Sinking Ship", supposedly the lead single from an upcoming seventh studio album. On August 31, 2018, "King of the Road: A Tribute to Roger Miller" was released with Cake providing their version of Roger Miller's "Reincarnation" Cake also hinted at an upcoming seventh studio album in their bio for the Kaaboo Music Festival website, saying the album was due for release in late 2018. On October 25, 2018, the band released the music video for 'Sinking Ship", also announcing that money raised by single sales would go towards Doctors Without Borders. On 19 January 2021, they released a demo for a new song titled "Hold You (Responsible)" on Instagram and Twitter. On October 18, 2024, the compilation album "Songs For Sex" by Noise For Now included the full version of "Hold You (Responsible)".

During a live performance for Texas Public Radio on 22 October 2024, Cake performed a new song titled "Billionaire in Space", set to be included off a new album "to be released [in 2025]." In an interview with Guitar World in October 2025, guitarist Xan McCurdy said "I'm very confident that we will have a release by next year. Maybe early 2026."

== Musical style and legacy ==
The band logo used on album covers

Cake incorporates a wide range of genres into its music, including country music, mariachi, new wave, college rock, jazz, funk, Iranian folk music, Brazilian music, and hip-hop. McCrea himself cites Hank Williams, Tom Zé, the Golden Gate Quartet, and Sly and the Family Stone as particular influences. The band is most often noted for four things: the prominence of DiFiore's trumpet lines; McCrea's ironic, sarcastic lyrics; his "droll, deadpan ... monotone" vocals; and the use of the vibraslap. DiFiore's trumpet work originated with McCrea's desire for a second melodic instrument to go with a song he had written; "A lead guitar playing those lines would have been really hokey. I like it when it's a contrapuntal thing, where the guitar is doing one melody, the vocal is doing another melody, and the trumpet plays this third melody. If the music can be transparent enough, you can hear all three at the same time".

In 2025, Jeff Mezydlo of Yardbarker included the band in his list of "20 underrated bands from the 1990s who are worth rediscovering".

== Band members ==
Current members

- John McCrea – lead vocals, guitar, piano, organ, vibraslap (1991–present)
- Vince DiFiore – trumpet, keyboards, melodica, percussion, backing vocals (1991–present)
- Todd Roper – drums, percussion, backing vocals (1994–2001, 2016–present)
- Xan McCurdy – guitar, backing vocals (1997–present) (session musician 1997–1998)
- Daniel McCallum – bass guitar, backing vocals (2016–present)

Former members

- Greg Brown – guitar, organ, backing vocals (1991–1997; died 2026)
- Frank French – drums (1991–1994)
- Shon Meckfessel – bass guitar, backing vocals (1991)
- Rusty Miller – guitar (1998)
- Gabe Nelson – bass guitar, backing vocals (1992–1994, 1997–2015)
- Victor Damiani – bass guitar, backing vocals (1994–1997)
- Pete McNeal – drums, backing vocals (2001–2004)
- Paulo Baldi – drums, percussion, backing vocals (2004–2015)
- Casey Lipka – bass guitar, backing vocals (2016–2018)

== Discography ==
Studio albums

- Motorcade of Generosity (1994)
- Fashion Nugget (1996)
- Prolonging the Magic (1998)
- Comfort Eagle (2001)
- Pressure Chief (2004)
- Showroom of Compassion (2011)

== Awards and nominations ==
Cake have been nominated for five awards: four California Music Awards and one MTV Video Music Award.

Year	Nominee / work	Award	Result
2001	Comfort Eagle	California Music Awards Outstanding Album	Nominated
2001	"Short Skirt/Long Jacket"	California Music Awards Outstanding Single	Nominated
2001	Comfort Eagle	California Music Awards Outstanding Modern Rock/Alternative Album	Nominated
2001	Cake	California Music Awards Outstanding Group	Nominated
2002	"Short Skirt/Long Jacket"	MTV VMA Breakthrough Video	Nominated
