= John McCrea (musician) =

American musician (born 1964)

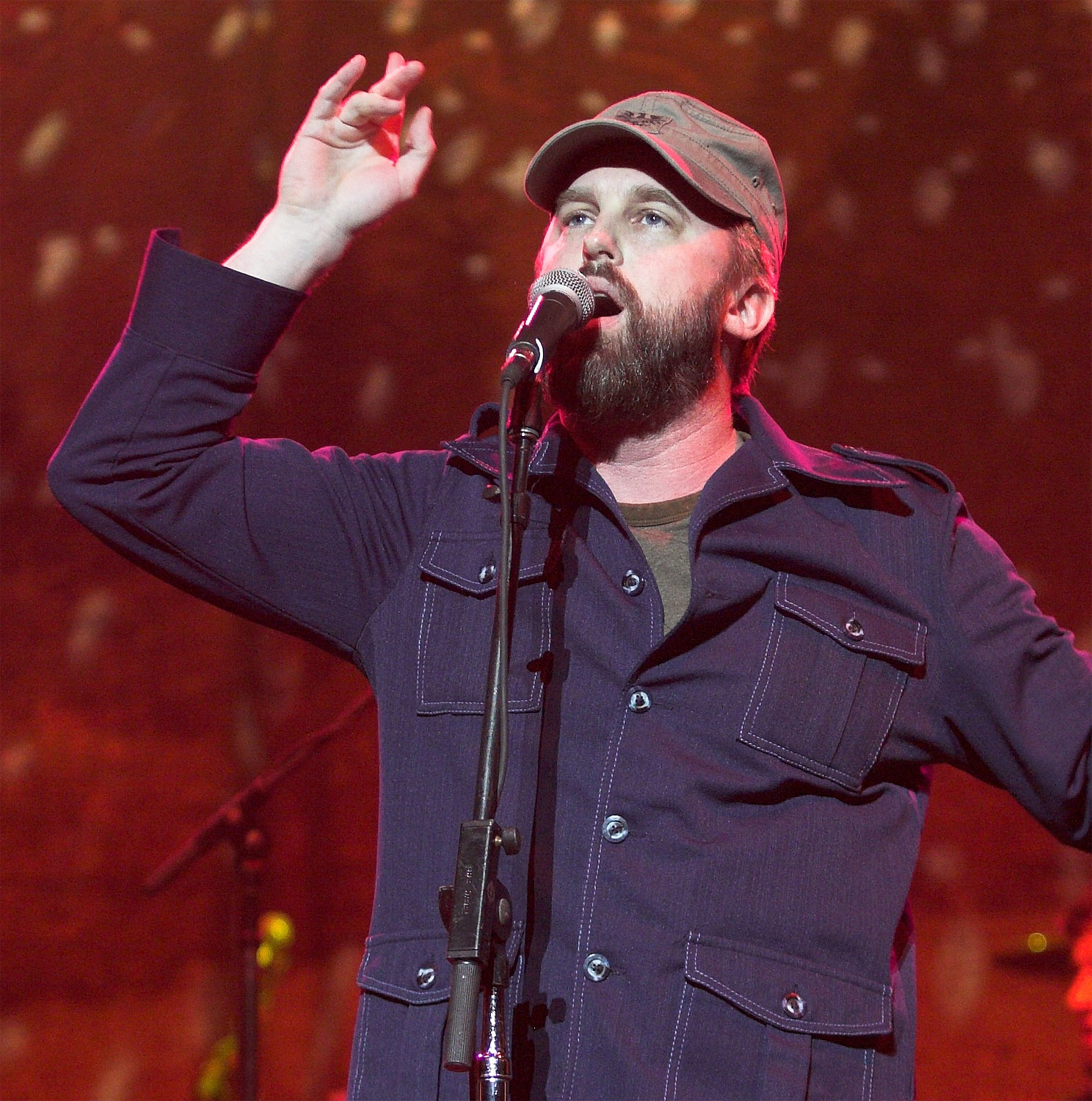
- McCrea performing in 2006

Background information
- Born: John Martin McCrea; June 25, 1964 (age 62)
- Genre: Alternative rock
- Occupations: Vocalist, musician
- Instruments: Vocals, guitar, piano, vibraslap
- Years active: 1982–present
- Member of: Cake

John Martin McCrea (born June 25, 1964) is an American singer and musician. He is a founding member of the band Cake. He is the vocalist and primary lyricist for the band, in addition to playing acoustic guitar, vibraslap, and piano. He also programs drums and does mixing work while he and the rest of the band have produced all of their albums.

== Personal life ==
McCrea is a vocal activist for various causes, notably global warming, reforestation and world poverty. He frequently uses the band's website and concerts as a platform to increase awareness about these and other issues. He was a member of the board of directors of HeadCount, a non-profit organization that uses music to promote voter registration and participation. He is also a founder of the Content Creators Coalition, a group of musicians and creatives that advocates for the rights of artists.

McCrea either is (or has been) married and has children.
