= Livin' Our Love Together =

Single by Billie Jo Spears

from the album I Will Survive
- B-side: "You"
- Released: July 1979
- Recorded: February 1979
- Studio: Jack Clement Recording (Nashville, Tennessee)
- Genre: Country disco
- Label: United Artists
- Songwriter(s): Ben Peters
- Producer(s): Larry Butler

Billie Jo Spears singles chronology
"I Will Survive" (1979)	"Livin' Our Love Together" (1979)	"Rainy Days and Stormy Nights" (1979)

"Livin' Our Love Together" is a song written by Ben Peters that was originally recorded by American country artist, Billie Jo Spears. It was released as a single by United Artists Records in 1979 and reached the top 40 of the North American country charts. It was included on Spears's 1979 studio album I Will Survive. The track was given favorable reviews following its release.

== Background, recording, release and reception ==
Billie Jo Spears was at the height of her career during the seventies with singles like "Blanket on the Ground", "What I've Got in Mind", "Misty Blue" and "If You Want Me". These singles reached the top ten, along with a series of top 20 and top 40 recordings that followed through the early 1980s. Among these songs was 1979's "Livin' Our Love Together". The song was composed by Ben Peters and produced by Larry Butler. The session was held in February 1979 at the Jack Clement Recording Studio in Nashville, Tennessee.

"Livin' Our Love Together" was first included as an album track on Spears's studio LP I Will Survive. The disc was released in May 1979. It was then spawned as the album's second single in July 1979 via United Artists Records. It was backed on the B-side by the track "You". It was issued as a seven-inch vinyl disc. "Livin' Our Love Together" entered the American Billboard Hot Country Songs chart in August 1979. It spent a total of 12 weeks there, peaking at the number 23 position. It also reached number 38 on the Canadian RPM Country Tracks chart. When reviewing I Will Survive, Cash Box called the song one of the album's "best cuts".

== Track listing ==
7" vinyl single

- "Livin' Our Love Together" – 2:45
- "You" – 3:03

== Charts ==
Weekly chart performance for "Livin' Our Love Together"
Chart (1979)	Peak position
Canada Country Tracks (RPM)	38
US Hot Country Songs (Billboard)	23
