= Country Girl (1970 Billie Jo Spears album) =

Studio album by Billie Jo Spears
- Released: August 1970
- Recorded: February – June 1970
- Studio: Jack Clement Recording (Nashville, Tennessee)
- Genre: Country
- Label: Capitol
- Producer: George Richey

Billie Jo Spears chronology
With Love, Billie Jo Spears (1970)	Country Girl (1970)	Just Singin' (1971)

Singles from Country Girl
- 1. "Marty Gray" Released: June 1970; 2. "I Stayed Long Enough" Released: October 1970

Country Girl is a studio album by American country artist, Billie Jo Spears. It was released on Capitol Records in August 1970 and contained ten tracks. It was the fifth studio album of Spears's career and featured original material along with cover tunes. Among its new recordings was the top 20 country single, "Marty Gray". The album received positive reviews from critics following its release.

== Background ==
Billie Jo Spears rose to commercial with a 1969 song about sexual harassment called "Mr. Walker, It's All Over". The top ten single was proceeded by a series of charting singles and other recordings at Capitol Records through the seventies. "Mr. Walker, It's All Over" (and her previous work) had been produced by Kelso Herston. However, Spears began working with George Richey in 1970. Richey attempted to bring Spears in a pop direction. Country Girl was Spears's second album that was produced by Richey.

== Recording and content ==
The project was cut in sessions between February and June 1970 at the Jack Clement Recording Studio, located in Nashville, Tennessee. Country Girl consisted of ten tracks. Of its new material was the song "Marty Gray", which told the story of a teenage girl who has unexpected pregnancy. Another new recording was Spears's self-penned "Part of You". Several of the tracks were covers of popular recordings of the era. Among them was Conway Twitty's "Hello Darlin'" and Elvis Presley's "The Wonder of You". Spears also covered Tammy Wynette's "I Stayed Long Enough", which first appeared on her 1969 album Stand by Your Man.

== Release, critical reception and singles ==
Country Girl was released in August 1970 by Capitol Records. It was the fifth studio album of Spears's career. It was distributed as a vinyl LP, containing five songs on both sides of the disc. The album received positive reception from critics and writers. Billboard magazine called the tracks "Which Way You Goin' Billy" and "Yours Love" to be "excellent". The magazine concluded by saying, "This album will experience ample country music sales". Alan Cackett of Country Music People called the production "simple and uncluttered". Cackett further commented, "The title neatly summed up Billie Jo and the selection showed her wide choice of material." AllMusic later rated the album four out of five stars.

Two singles were featured on the album. Its most successful was "Marty Gray", released in June 1970. "Marty Gray" reached the top 20 of the American Billboard Hot Country Songs chart, peaking at number 17. Spears's version of "I Stayed Long Enough" was released as a single in October 1970, peaking at number 30 on the Hot Country Songs chart later that year.

== Track listing ==
Side one
No.	Title	Writer(s)	Length
1.	"Marty Gray"	Walter Woodward	2:43
2.	"Hello Darlin'"	Conway Twitty	2:33
3.	"Part of You"	Billie Jo Spears	2:02
4.	"The Wonder of You"	Baker Knight	2:04
5.	"Yours Love"	Harlan Howard	2:04

Side two
No.	Title	Writer(s)	Length
1.	"Big Stick of Dynamite"	Lola Jean Dillon	2:18
2.	"Heart Over Mind"	Mel Tillis	2:30
3.	"Come on Home"	George Richey; Jack Rhodes	2:21
4.	"Which Way You Goin' Billy?"	Terry Jacks	3:09
5.	"I Stayed Long Enough"	Tammy Wynette	2:13

== Release history ==
Region	Date	Format	Label	Ref.
North America	August 1970	Vinyl	Capitol Records	
