= I Will Survive =

1978 single by Gloria Gaynor

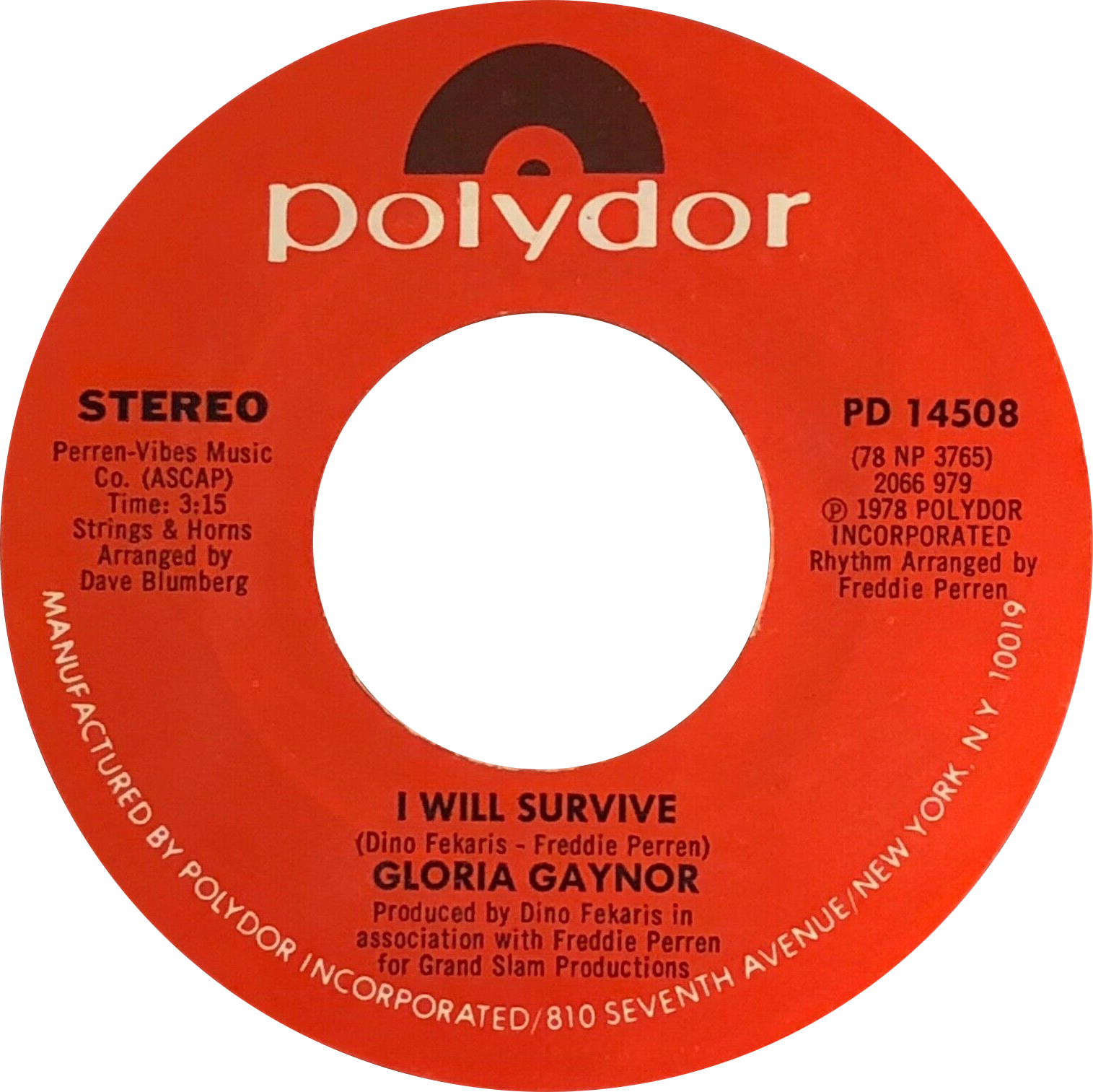
- US 7-inch vinyl single

Single by Gloria Gaynor

from the album Love Tracks
- A-side: "Substitute"
- Released: October 23, 1978
- Recorded: 1978
- Studio: Mom & Pop's Company Store, Los Angeles, California
- Genre: Disco; soul
- Length: 4:56 (album version); 3:15 (single version); 8:01 (12" version)
- Label: Polydor
- Songwriters: Freddie Perren; Dino Fekaris
- Producers: Freddie Perren; Dino Fekaris

Gloria Gaynor singles chronology
| "Let's Make a Deal" (1976) | "I Will Survive" (1978) | "Anybody Wanna Party?" (1979) |

Music video
- "I Will Survive" on YouTube

"I Will Survive" is a song recorded by American singer Gloria Gaynor, released in October 1978 by Polydor Records as the second single from her sixth album, Love Tracks (1978). It was written by Freddie Perren and Dino Fekaris. The song's lyrics describe the narrator's discovery of personal strength following an initially devastating breakup. The song is frequently regarded as a feminist anthem (even though Gaynor rejects the feminist label) and as an anthem of gay empowerment, as well as a disco staple.

"I Will Survive" received heavy airplay in 1979. The single spent three non-consecutive weeks at number one on the US Billboard Hot 100, and also peaked atop the UK Singles Chart and Irish Singles Chart. It was later certified Platinum by the Recording Industry Association of America (RIAA). It won Best Disco Recording at the 22nd Annual Grammy Awards, and also received nominations for Record of the Year, Song of the Year and Best Female Pop Vocal Performance. It is one of the best-selling singles in history to date, having sold over 15 million copies worldwide.

In 2016, the Library of Congress deemed Gaynor's original recording to be "culturally, historically, or aesthetically significant" and selected it for preservation in the National Recording Registry. In 2023 and 2025, Billboard magazine included "I Will Survive" in their lists of the best pop and dance songs of all time.

== Composition and recording ==
According to Dino Fekaris, the principal writer of the song, "I Will Survive" has its genesis in his experience getting fired by Motown Records in the mid-1970s after seven years working there as a staff writer. Jobless, he turned on the TV in his room, and a theme song he had written for the film Generation (performed by Rare Earth) happened to be playing. He took it as a good omen, and jumped up and down on the bed saying, "I'm going to make it. I'm going to be a songwriter. I will survive!". Fekaris teamed up with his collaborator Freddie Perren, another former member of the Motown production team, to write the song; however, the song remained unrecorded for two years as no suitable singer was available.

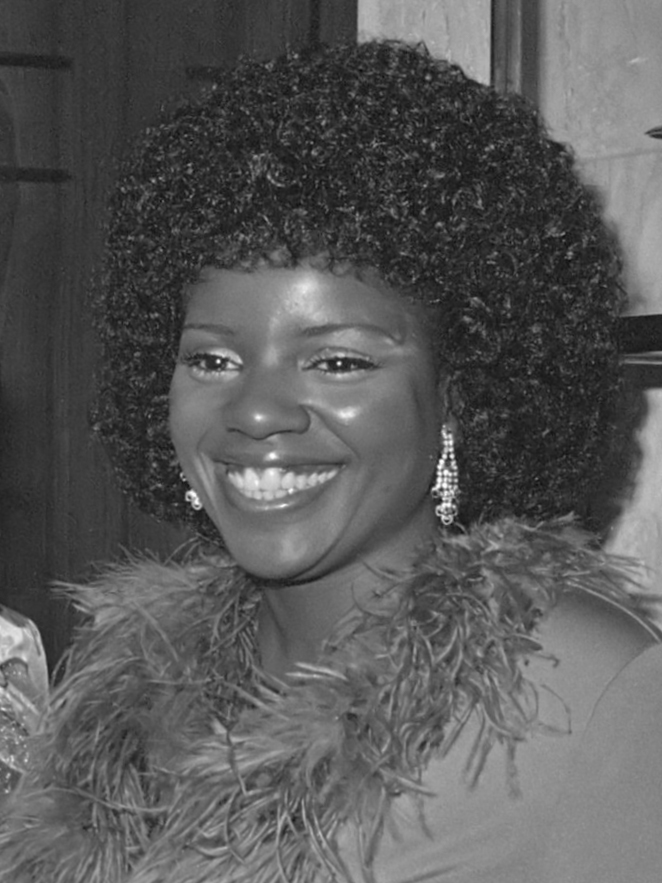
Gloria Gaynor performed "I Will Survive", which became one of her signature songs.

In 1978, Perren was asked by Polydor to produce "Substitute" for Gloria Gaynor, which he agreed on the understanding that he could also produce the B-side. When Gaynor was asked what kind of songs she liked, she said she liked "songs that are meaningful, have good lyrics, and touch people's hearts". The producers then handed her the song lyrics of "I Will Survive" scribbled on a piece of brown paper. Gaynor recognized the song as a hit immediately.

According to Robert "Boogie" Bowles, who played guitar on the song, in the three-hour recording session, the session musicians spent most of their time recording the A side, "Substitute". As a result, they only had 35 minutes to record the B-side "I Will Survive". They also did not even know the song title or the melody of the song, but they were fairly relaxed recording it in the belief that the B-side would likely not be played. Based only on the chord changes and a few notes, they improvised freely much of the backing track, and Bowles filled in the bare bone of the tune with jazzy blues licks. Due to the difference in the intro from the main body of the tune which made a smooth transition difficult, it was recorded in two parts and then spliced together. Gaynor then recorded the vocals wearing a back brace, having just had a surgery due to a fall at a concert. The injury and a recent bereavement made Gaynor identify with the sentiment of "I Will Survive"; she said: "That's why I was able to sing the song with so much conviction".

== Releases ==
Although Gaynor was convinced that "I Will Survive" would be a hit and tried to persuade the label to release it as the A side, the label refused to entertain the idea and it was released as the B-side to "Substitute". Gaynor's husband took the song to the Studio 54 DJ Richie Kaczor, who loved it. Gaynor gave Kaczor a stack of the records to give to his friends. Other DJs in discos and radio stations soon followed and played that side of the record instead. The popularity of "I Will Survive" led to the label releasing the song as an A side. To support the single, a video shot at Xenon Discotheque in New York was released. It featured a roller skater – Sheila Reid-Pender from a local group called The Village Wizards – skate dancing on the dance floor.

The original A-side "Substitute" appeared on the US Billboard Hot Soul Singles chart for four weeks starting October 14, 1978, peaking at No. 78. It also appeared on the Billboard Bubbling Under the Hot 100 chart for four weeks in October–November 1978, peaking at No. 107. "I Will Survive" on the other hand performed significantly better; it entered the Billboard Hot 100 in December that year and reached No. 1 on the chart in March 1979. The song received the Grammy Award for Best Disco Recording in 1980, the only year the award was given. In 2012, the song was inducted into the Grammy Hall of Fame.

== Remixes ==
Following the success of fellow 1970s disco stars Sister Sledge with remixed singles in the UK in 1993, "I Will Survive" was also remixed and released that summer. This remix reached number five on the UK Singles Chart and number three on the UK Dance Singles Chart. It also peaked at number six in Ireland and number nine in Portugal. In 1999, a remix of the song charted in France, peaking at number 23. And in 2000, another remix reached number six in Spain. In November 2013, Gaynor released a gospel album entitled We Will Survive, which includes a new, updated remix of "I Will Survive" by DJ Shpank in both extended and radio edit formats. In 2018, a remix again charted in France, peaking at number 12.

== Music video ==
A promotional video was filmed in 1979 at a New York discothèque called Xenon. It features Gaynor singing, interspersed with roller skating dance sequences performed by Sheila Reid-Pender of Harlem, a member of the skating group The Village Wizards. Although three videos were filmed that day, the "I Will Survive" video was the only one to survive. Gaynor was not present during the taping of the roller skating segment of the video.

Gaynor and Pender met for the first time on July 7, 2014, in New York at the 92nd St. YMCA after Gaynor's lecture and promotional signing of her book We Will Survive. In the book, Gaynor wrote, "I wanted everybody—including myself—to believe that we could survive."

In 2022, the video was remastered in HD and officially uploaded to Gaynor's YouTube channel, obtaining over 4.5 million views in two months.

== Impact and legacy ==
In 2000, VH1 ranked "I Will Survive" number one in their list of "100 Greatest Dance Songs". Rolling Stone ranked it number 489 in their "List of Rolling Stone's 500 Greatest Songs of All Time" in 2004, number 492 in 2010, and number 251 in 2021. In 2008, Billboard magazine ranked it number 97 in their list of "The Billboard Hot 100 All-Time Top Songs". In 2012, "I Will Survive" was ranked number two in Rolling Stone poll of "The Best Disco Songs of All Time". In November 2016, The Daily Telegraph ranked it number 48 in their "The 100 Greatest Songs of All Time" list. In 2017, Paste Magazine ranked the song number seven in their "The 60 Best Dancefloor Classics" list. In 2018, Pitchfork featured it in their list of "50 Songs That Define the Last 50 Years of LGBTQ+ Pride". They added

"I Will Survive" probably would've become a gay anthem even without the spectre of AIDS. It has an undeniable flair for the dramatic: After moving through that filigreed piano intro, you can imagine a lone spotlight shining on Gloria Gaynor as she drags the man dumb enough to break her heart and crawl back for more. It was released as disco's wave was beginning to break, topping the Billboard charts a few months before the infamous Disco Demolition Night at Comiskey Park. Had the story ended there, it'd represent the last, best gasp of a culture beaten into temporary irrelevance by thinly-veiled racism and homophobia.

In 2023 and 2025, Billboard ranked it numbers 35 and 21 in their lists of "500 Best Pop Songs of All Time" and "100 Best Dance Songs of All Time". In 1998, the France men's national football team made "I Will Survive" their unofficial anthem, particularly focusing on the instrumental sub-theme to sing "la la la la la". France then won that year's FIFA World Cup for the first time as hosts, and the song enjoyed immense popular enthusiasm amongst younger generations in the country, twenty years after its original release. The chant was originally inspired by a remix of the song by Hermes House Band, but Gaynor later released a version with the "la la la la la" chant included.

=== Accolades ===
| Year | Publisher | Country | Accolade | Rank |
|---|---|---|---|---|
| 2000 | VH1 | United States | "100 Greatest Dance Songs" | 1 |
| 2004 | Rolling Stone | United States | "Rolling Stone's 500 Greatest Songs of All Time" | 492 |
| 2005 | Bruce Pollock | United States | "The 7,500 Most Important Songs of 1944–2000" | Unranked |
| 2008 | Billboard | United States | "The Billboard Hot 100 All-Time Top Songs" | 97 |
| 2009 | The Guardian | United Kingdom | "1000 Songs Everyone Must Hear" | Unranked |
| 2012 | Rolling Stone | United States | "The Best Disco Songs of All Time" | 2 |
| 2013 | Max | Australia | "1000 Greatest Songs of All Time" | 120 |
| 2015 | Billboard | United States | "25 Best Catchy Songs of All Time" | 16 |
| 2016 | Billboard | United States | "The 35 Best Disco Songs Ever" | 14 |
| 2016 | The Daily Telegraph | United Kingdom | "The 100 Greatest Songs of All Time" | 48 |
| 2017 | Paste Magazine | United States | "The 60 Best Dancefloor Classics" | 7 |
| 2018 | Pitchfork | United States | "50 Songs that Define the Last 50 Years of LGBTQ+ Pride" | Unranked |
| 2020 | The Guardian | United Kingdom | "The 100 Greatest UK No 1s" | 84 |
| 2021 | Rolling Stone | United States | "Rolling Stone's 500 Greatest Songs of All Time" (2021 Update) | 251 |
| 2022 | Billboard | United States | "Top 50 Dance Remixes of Classic Hits" | 40 |
| 2022 | Rolling Stone | United States | "200 Greatest Dance Songs of All Time" | 43 |
| 2022 | Time Out | United Kingdom | "The 50 Best Gay Songs to Celebrate Pride All Year Long" | 1 |
| 2023 | Billboard | United States | "Best Pop Songs of All Time" | 35 |
| 2023 | Official UK Chart | United Kingdom | "The Best-Selling Singles of All Time" | 132 |
| 2023 | Rolling Stone | United States | "The 50 Most Inspirational LGBTQ Songs of All Time" | 10 |
| 2024 | Forbes | United States | "The 30 Greatest Disco Songs of All Time" | 20 |
| 2025 | Billboard | United States | "100 Best Dance Songs of All Time" | 21 |
| 2025 | Billboard | United States | "Top 100 Breakup Songs of All Time" | 2 |
| 2025 | Billboard | United States | "The 100 Greatest LGBTQ+ Anthems of All Time" | 11 |

== Personnel ==
- Vocals: Gloria Gaynor
- Drums: James Gadson
- Percussion: Paulinho Da Costa
- Bass guitar: Scott Edwards
- Keyboards: Freddie Perren
- Guitars: Bob "Boogie" Bowles, Melvin "Wah Wah Watson" Ragin
- Strings and horns: arranged and conducted by Dave Blumberg

== Official versions ==
Recorded by Gloria Gaynor

- "I Will Survive" (1978 single version) – 3.15
- "I Will Survive" (1978 album version) – 4.56
- "I Will Survive" (1978 12" Mix) – 8.02
- "Yo Viviré" (I Will Survive Spanish 12" Mix) – 7.55
- "I Will Survive" (Tom Moulton Mix) – 10.33
- "I Will Survive" (2009 re-recording) – 5.35
- "I Will Survive" (2009 re-recording Spanish version) - 5.37

== Charts ==
=== Weekly charts ===
| Chart (1978–1979) | Peak position |
|---|---|
| Australia (Kent Music Report) | 5 |
| Austria (Ö3 Austria Top 40) | 17 |
| Belgium (Ultratop 50 Flanders) | 7 |
| Canada Top Singles (RPM) | 3 |
| Canada Adult Contemporary (RPM) | 1 |
| Canada Dance/Urban (RPM) | 2 |
| Canada Top 15 12-inch (RPM) | 5 |
| Ecuador (Radio Vision) | 2 |
| Finland (Suomen virallinen lista) | 3 |
| Ireland (IRMA) | 1 |
| Italy (Musica e dischi) | 9 |
| Netherlands (Dutch Top 40) | 4 |
| Netherlands (Single Top 100) | 5 |
| New Zealand (Recorded Music NZ) | 10 |
| Norway (VG-lista) | 4 |
| South Africa (Springbok Radio) | 2 |
| Sweden (Sverigetopplistan) | 3 |
| Switzerland (Schweizer Hitparade) | 7 |
| UK Singles (Official Charts) | 1 |
| US Billboard Hot 100 | 1 |
| US Adult Contemporary (Billboard) | 9 |
| US Dance Club Songs (Billboard) | 1 |
| US Hot R&B/Hip-Hop Songs (Billboard) | 4 |
| US Cash Box Top 100 | 1 |
| West Germany (GfK) | 7 |

Remix
| Chart (1988) | Peak position |
|---|---|
| Belgium (Ultratop 50 Flanders) | 32 |
| Netherlands (Dutch Top 40) | 14 |
| Netherlands (Single Top 100) | 15 |

Phil Kelsey remix
| Chart (1993) | Peak position |
|---|---|
| Europe (European Hot 100 Singles) | 19 |
| Ireland (IRMA) | 6 |
| Portugal (AFP) | 9 |
| UK Singles (Official Charts) | 5 |
| UK Airplay (Music Week) | 23 |
| UK Dance (Music Week) | 3 |
| UK Club Chart (Music Week) | 33 |

"I Will Survive '98"
| Chart (1999) | Peak position |
|---|---|
| Europe (European Hot 100 Singles) | 96 |
| France (SNEP) | 23 |

| Chart (2000) | Peak position |
|---|---|
| France (SNEP) Remixes 2002 | 71 |
| Spain (Promusicae) UK Remix 94 | 6 |

| Chart (2018) | Peak position |
|---|---|
| France (SNEP) | 12 |

| Chart (2024) | Peak position |
|---|---|
| Kazakhstan Airplay (TopHit) Alex Grand and Glazunov Remix | 94 |

=== Year-end charts ===
| Chart (1979) | Position |
|---|---|
| Australia (Kent Music Report) | 25 |
| Belgium (Ultratop 50 Flanders) | 68 |
| Canada Top Singles (RPM) | 20 |
| Netherlands (Dutch Top 40) | 47 |
| Netherlands (Single Top 100) | 65 |
| South Africa (Springbok Radio) | 16 |
| UK Singles (OCC) | 6 |
| US Billboard Hot 100 | 6 |
| US Dance Club Songs (Billboard) | 5 |
| US Cash Box Top 100 | 10 |
| West Germany (GfK) | 47 |

=== All-time charts ===
| Chart (1958–2018) | Position |
|---|---|
| US Billboard Hot 100 | 124 |

| Chart | Position |
|---|---|
| UK Singles (OCC) | 132 |

== Certifications and sales ==
| Region | Certification | Certified units/sales |
|---|---|---|
| Canada (Music Canada) | Platinum | 150,000^{^} |
| Denmark (IFPI Danmark) Remix | Gold | 45,000^{‡} |
| Germany (BVMI) | Gold | 250,000^{‡} |
| Italy (FIMI) Sales since 2009 | Platinum | 100,000^{‡} |
| New Zealand (RMNZ) | 2× Platinum | 60,000^{‡} |
| Spain (Promusicae) | Platinum | 60,000^{‡} |
| United Kingdom (BPI) | Platinum | 1,082,038 |
| United States (RIAA) Physical | Platinum | 2,000,000^{^} |
| United States (RIAA) Digital | Gold | 500,000^{*} |
Summaries
| Worldwide | — | 15,000,000 |
^{*} Sales figures based on certification alone.^{^} Shipments figures based on certification alone.^{‡} Sales+streaming figures based on certification alone.

== Billie Jo Spears version ==
"I Will Survive"

Single by Billie Jo Spears

from the album I Will Survive
- B-side: "Rainy Days and Stormy Nights"
- Released: March 1979
- Recorded: February 1979
- Studio: Jack Clement Recording Studio
- Genre: Country-disco
- Length: 3:16
- Label: United Artists Records
- Songwriters: Freddie Perren; Dino Fekaris
- Producer: Larry Butler

Billie Jo Spears singles chronology
| "Yesterday" (1979) | "I Will Survive" (1979) | "Livin' Our Love Together" (1979) |

=== Background and recording ===
"I Will Survive" was notably covered by American country artist, Billie Jo Spears in 1979. Spears had become known for several popular country singles that exemplified strong women. This included a song about sexual harassment ("Mr. Walker, It's All Over") and a tune about a woman walking away from a bad relationship ("Standing Tall"). Among these recordings was her cover of "I Will Survive". The track was produced in February 1979 by Larry Butler at the Jack Clement Recording Studio (located in Nashville, Tennessee).

=== Release, chart performance and reception ===
Spears's cover of "I Will Survive" was released in March 1979 by United Artists Records. It was backed on the B-side by the song, "Rainy Days and Stormy Nights". The disc was released as a seven-inch vinyl record. The single entered the American Billboard Hot Country Songs chart in April 1979. It spent a total of eleven weeks on the chart, climbing to the number 21 position in June 1979. In Canada, the song was more commercially-successful, peaking at number nine on their RPM Country Tracks chart. It also became her fourth single to chart in the United Kingdom, reaching number 47. It was released on Spears's 1979 album of the same name. In 1980, the tune was nominated by the Grammy Awards for Best Female Country Vocal Performance. It was Spears's only nomination from the Grammy's.

Spears's cover followed a similar disco style to that of Gaynor's original. Rolling Stone placed on its 2018 list titled, "Country Disco: 15 Great, Wild and WTF Songs". Writer Stephen L. Betts stated, "With the familiar piano opening by Hargus "Pig" Robbins and backing vocals from The Jordanaires, the Grammy-nominated country-meets-western-meets-Studio 54 concoction remains deliciously odd and totally irresistible." While a success in the multiple markets, Spears later reflected, "It is still a country record. I could never go pop with my mouthful of firecrackers." Spears also commented that she found the song difficult to sing live. "That is a very difficult song to sing. There are so many words in it and they come so fast," she stated.

=== Track listing ===
7" vinyl single

1. "I Will Survive" – 3:16
2. "Rainy Days and Stormy Nights" – 2:35

=== Charts ===
| Chart (1979) | Peak position |
|---|---|
| Canada Country Tracks (RPM) | 9 |
| UK Singles (Official Charts) | 47 |
| US Hot Country Songs (Billboard) | 21 |

== Hermes House Band version ==
Dutch group Hermes House Band covered the song in 1994, retitled "I Will Survive (La La La)", topping both the Dutch Top 40 and Single Top 100 chart. It is also used as a goal tune during home games for Feyenoord, Galatasaray, Celta de Vigo and Amur Khabarovsk.

=== Charts ===
==== Weekly charts ====
| Chart (1994–1999) | Peak position |
|---|---|
| Belgium (Ultratop 50 Flanders) | 13 |
| Belgium (Ultratop 50 Wallonia) | 3 |
| Europe (European Hot 100 Singles) | 13 |
| France (SNEP) | 3 |
| Germany (GfK) | 17 |
| Netherlands (Dutch Top 40) | 1 |
| Netherlands (Single Top 100) | 1 |

==== Year-end charts ====
| Chart (1995) | Position |
|---|---|
| Belgium (Ultratop 50 Flanders) | 64 |
| Belgium (Ultratop 50 Wallonia) | 78 |
| Netherlands (Dutch Top 40) | 49 |
| Netherlands (Single Top 100) | 38 |

| Chart (1997) | Position |
|---|---|
| France (SNEP) | 20 |

| Chart (1998) | Position |
|---|---|
| France (SNEP) | 14 |

| Chart (1999) | Position |
|---|---|
| Germany (Media Control) | 76 |

==== Decade-end charts ====
| Chart (1990–1999) | Rank |
|---|---|
| Netherlands (Dutch Top 40) | 55 |

=== Certifications ===
| Region | Certification | Certified units/sales |
|---|---|---|
| Belgium (BRMA) | Gold | 25,000^{*} |
| France (SNEP) | Platinum | 500,000^{*} |
| Netherlands (NVPI) | Platinum | 75,000^{^} |
^{*} Sales figures based on certification alone.^{^} Shipments figures based on certification alone.

== Chantay Savage version ==
"I Will Survive"

Single by Chantay Savage

from the album I Will Survive (Doin' It My Way)
- Released: January 23, 1996
- Genre: R&B
- Length: 6:12
- Label: RCA
- Songwriters: Freddie Perren; Dino Fekaris

Chantay Savage singles chronology
| "Give It to Ya" (1994) | "I Will Survive" (1996) | "Baby: Drive Me Crazy" (1996) |

Music video
- "I Will Survive" on YouTube

American singer Chantay Savage covered "I Will Survive" in 1996 as a ballad. It was released on January 23, 1996, by RCA Records as the first single from her second album, I Will Survive (Doin' It My Way) (1996). This version peaked at number 24 on the US Billboard Hot 100, and was certified gold by the Recording Industry Association of America (RIAA). It also peaked at number 12 on the UK Singles Chart and number 52 on the Eurochart Hot 100.

=== Critical reception ===
Michael Hill from Cash Box commented:

What a track! What a vocal performance performance! If not for the title, it's hard to tell that this song is a remake of the still-popular Gloria Gaynor track. Steve "Silky" Hurley outdid himself on this track and it's difficult to decide which of the four mixes to play. Chantay delivers a smooth, easy and controlled vocal performance which should make her version a big hit. Expect huge radio play and quite possibly some "tin" for this little lady.

Alan Jones from Music Week described Savage's version as a "sublime R&B-flavoured rendition". Gerald Martinez from New Sunday Times wrote,

Chantay has a fabulous voice, with a great range and rich, chocolatey tone, in the Anita Baker mould. She performs the old hit, "I Will Survive", at a slower sexier pace than the original, making it a very different statement than the rousing anthemic style of the original. This is a more personal, more vulnerable version. Nice track indeed.

=== Track listing ===
12-inch single

Side A

1. "I Will Survive" (Puff Daddy "Bad Boy Mix")
2. "I Will Survive" (Silk's Old Skool Extended Mix with Clean Rap)
3. "I Will Survive" (Original LP version – edit)

Side B

1. "I Will Survive" (Silk's Classic House Mix)
2. "I Will Survive" (Rhythm Radio version)

=== Charts ===
==== Weekly charts ====
| Chart (1996) | Peak position |
|---|---|
| Europe (Eurochart Hot 100) | 52 |
| Europe (European Dance Radio) | 20 |
| Netherlands (Dutch Top 40 Tipparade) | 15 |
| Netherlands (Dutch Single Tip) | 7 |
| Scottish Singles Sales (Official Charts) | 39 |
| UK Singles (Official Charts) | 12 |
| UK Hip Hop/R&B (Official Charts) | 2 |
| US Billboard Hot 100 | 24 |
| US Dance Club Songs (Billboard) | 35 |
| US Dance Singles Sales (Billboard) | 10 |
| US Hot R&B/Hip-Hop Songs (Billboard) | 5 |
| US Cash Box Top 100 | 23 |

==== Year-end charts ====
| Chart (1996) | Position |
|---|---|
| US Hot R&B Singles (Billboard) | 24 |

== Diana Ross version ==
"I Will Survive"

Single by Diana Ross

from the album Take Me Higher
- B-side: "Voice of the Heart"
- Released: February 5, 1996
- Genre: House
- Length: 4:48
- Label: Motown
- Songwriters: Freddie Perren; Dino Fekaris
- Producer: Narada Michael Walden

Diana Ross singles chronology
| "Take Me Higher" (1995) | "I Will Survive" (1996) | "Not Over You Yet" (1999) |

Music video
- "I Will Survive" on YouTube

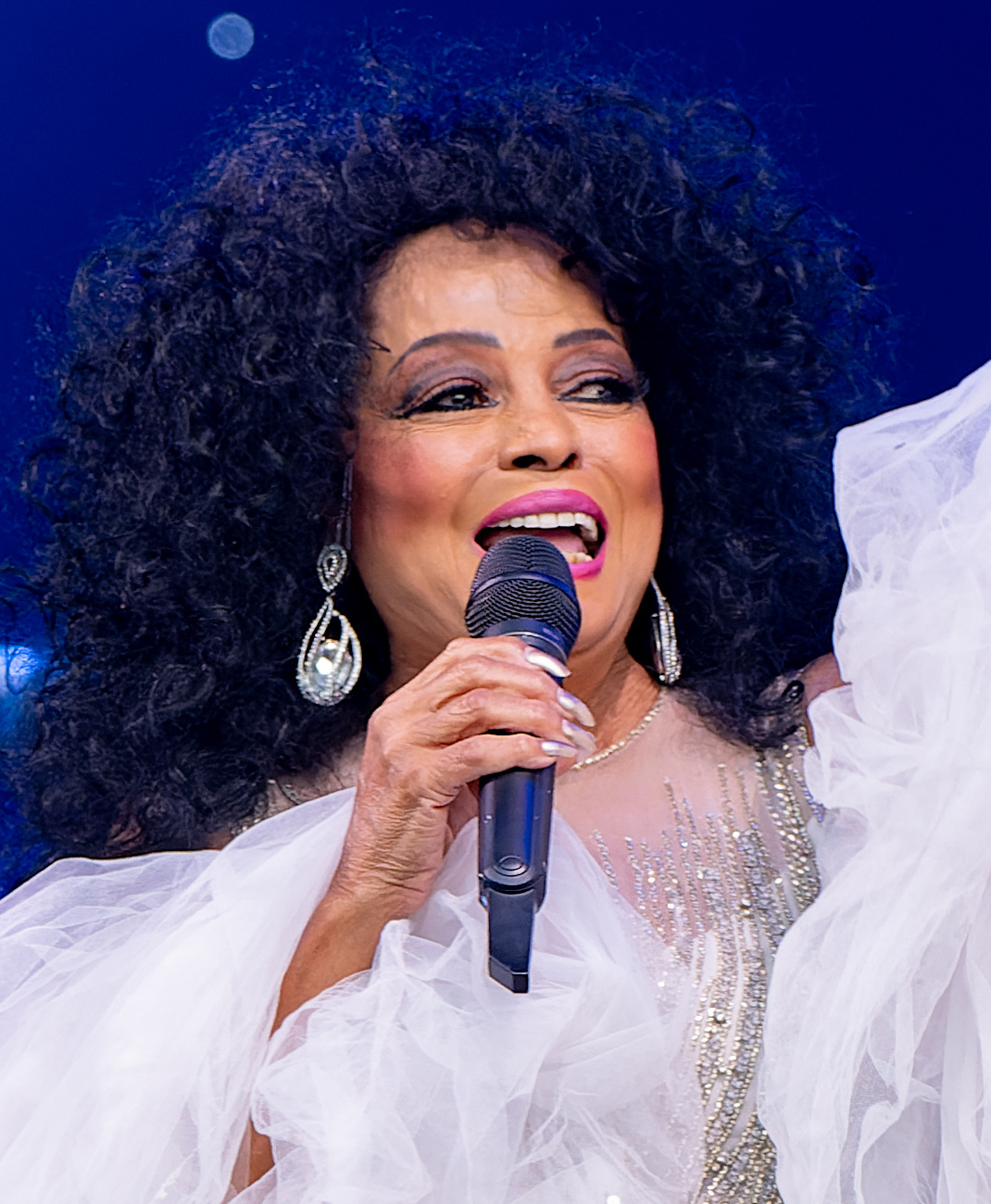
Diana Ross, 2022

American singer Diana Ross released a cover of "I Will Survive" in 1996. It was released on February 5, by Motown, as the fourth and final single from her twenty-first album, Take Me Higher (1995). The song is produced by Narada Michael Walden and peaked at number 14 in the United Kingdom. It also reached number three in Iceland, number nine in Israel and number 16 in Scotland. In the United States, it peaked at number 37 on the Billboard Hot Dance Club Play chart.

=== Critical reception ===
Larry Flick from Billboard magazine wrote, "The kicker is a delicious cover of Gloria Gaynor's 'I Will Survive', produced by Narada Michael Walden. Interestingly, that is the number that stands out in the legendary artist's current (and oh-so-festive) 2 1/2-hour show." Gil L. Robertson IV from Cash Box named it a "standout track" of the Take Me Higher album. In a 2010 retrospective review, the Daily Vault's Mark Millan constated that it is "dealt with superbly, as the team managed to breathe new life into an old relic from the distant, dark days when disco ruled."

The Stud Brothers of Melody Maker deemed it "a cheesy, breathy romp through Gloria Gaynor's feminist anthem". Alan Jones from Music Week stated that "the combination of two old favourites is bound to win favour with many people, and new dance mixes by Roger Sanchez will ease the track's path to success now it is a single." James Hamilton from the Record Mirror Dance Update noted the "galloping good Hi-NRG 0-134bpm Motiv 8 Club Vocal and Hell Razor Dub" in his weekly dance column. In a 2015 review, Pop Rescue concluded that this cover "definitely belts it out – vocally and musically".

=== Track listing ===
UK CD single

1. "I Will Survive" - 4:48
2. "I Will Survive" (Roger Sanchez Atmospheric Mix) - 4:31
3. "I Will Survive" (Motiv 8 Radio Mix) - 3:58
4. "Voice of the Heart" - 4:55

European CD maxi single

1. "I Will Survive" (Album Version) - 4:46
2. "I Will Survive" (Roger Sanchez Radio Edit) - 4:02
3. "I Will Survive" (Motiv 8 Radio Edit) - 3:56
4. "I Will Survive" (Sure Is Pure Vocal) - 8:58

=== Charts ===
==== Weekly charts ====
| Chart (1996) | Peak position |
|---|---|
| Europe (Eurochart Hot 100) | 57 |
| Iceland (Íslenski Listinn Topp 40) | 3 |
| Israel (Israeli Singles Chart) | 9 |
| Scottish Singles Sales (Official Charts) | 16 |
| UK Singles (Official Charts) | 14 |
| UK Club Chart (Music Week) | 12 |
| UK Pop Tip Club Chart (Music Week) | 2 |
| US Dance Club Songs (Billboard) | 37 |

==== Year-end charts ====
| Chart (1996) | Position |
|---|---|
| UK Pop Tip Club Chart (Music Week) | 30 |

== Cake version ==
"I Will Survive"

Single by Cake

from the album Fashion Nugget
- B-side: "Rock 'n' Roll Lifestyle"
- Released: 1997
- Length: 5:10; 4:14 (radio edit)
- Label: Capricorn
- Songwriters: Freddie Perren; Dino Fekaris
- Producer: Cake

Cake singles chronology
| "The Distance" (1996) | "I Will Survive" (1997) | "Never There" (1998) |

Music video
- "I Will Survive" on YouTube

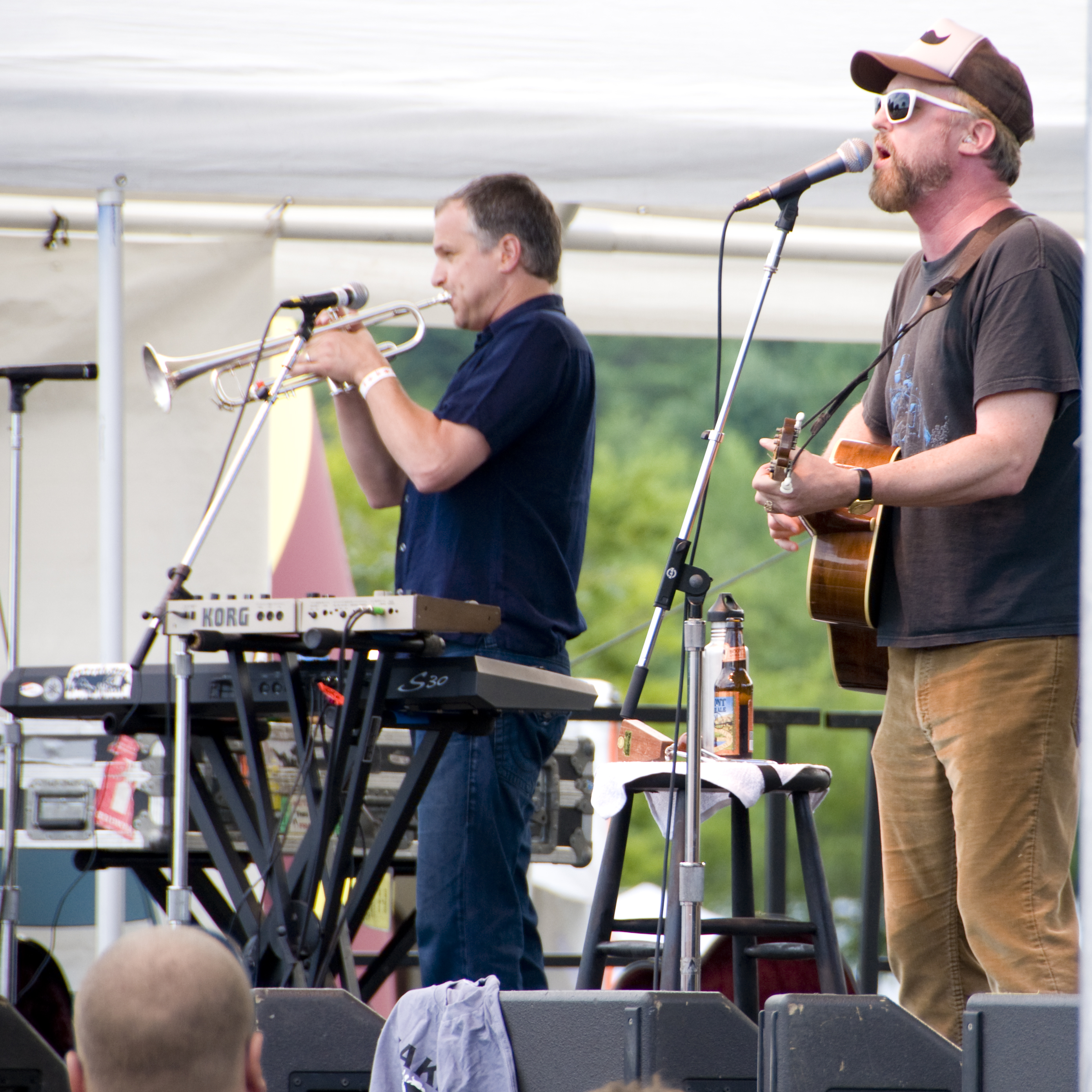
The band Cake, 2010: Vince DiFiore (left) on trumpet, singer John McCrea on guitar

American rock band Cake covered "I Will Survive" for their second album, Fashion Nugget (1996). In addition to many subtle changes, lead singer John McCrea altered the lyrics. In an interview, Gaynor stated she did not like Cake's version of the song because it used "profanity" (McCrea changed the phrase "I should've changed that stupid lock" to "...my fucking lock").

The music video of Cake's version features McCrea as a city parking enforcement officer driving around in a Cushman three-wheeled scooter as he leaves tickets on various cars. Their version peaked at number 28 on the US Billboard Modern Rock Tracks chart in March 1997.

=== Critical reception ===
Daina Darzin from Cash Box felt that the band is "at its bizarre best" on "the thoroughly and charmingly mangled version" of the Gloria Gaynor disco classic. A reviewer from Music Week rated the song three out of five, describing it as "a straight-up cover". The magazine's Alan Jones wrote:

'I Will Survive' is one of those songs l've always hated, but hot on the heels of Chantay Savage's sublime R&B-flavoured rendition which won favour last year, there's another highly enjoyable version from rising stars Cake. Lifted from their album, Fashion Nugget, it's powered by a funky bassline which dodges in and out of the vocals of John McCrea, whose tongue-in-cheek rendition is enhanced by his habit of letting his vocals trail a little behind the rest of the track.

=== Track listing ===
CD single

1. "I Will Survive" (radio edit) – 4:14
2. "Rock 'n' Roll Lifestyle" – 4:12

=== Charts ===
| Chart (1997) | Peak position |
|---|---|
| Australia (ARIA) | 27 |
| Europe (European Hot 100 Singles) | 77 |
| France (SNEP) | 37 |
| Germany (GfK) | 95 |
| New Zealand (Recorded Music NZ) | 27 |
| Scottish Singles Sales (Official Charts) | 22 |
| UK Singles (Official Charts) | 29 |
| US Alternative Airplay (Billboard) | 28 |

=== Certifications ===
| Region | Certification | Certified units/sales |
|---|---|---|
| United States (RIAA) | Gold | 500,000^{‡} |
^{‡} Sales+streaming figures based on certification alone.

== Other cover versions and samples ==
- Greek singer Filippos Nikolaou included a version in Greek in his 1979 album, Όμορφες στιγμές (Beautiful moments).
- A parody of the song titled "I Will Not Survive" was released by the Indonesian comedic musical group Project Pop in August 2005 as part of their album Pop Circus.
- The Voice UK contestant Leah McFall performed the song on the first live show in the style of Chantay Savage. A studio recording of the performance was released and reached number three on UK iTunes. The song debuted at number sixteen on the UK Singles Chart on June 9, 2013, and in the following week it reached number eight.
- Madonna covered the song live during The Celebration Tour, which prompted a response from Gaynor who congratulated Madonna on the launch of her tour, wished her well after her mid-2023 health scare and commented tongue-in-cheek that she had "excellent taste in music". On March 7, 2024, Madonna was joined on stage in Los Angeles by Kylie Minogue, with the two performing the song as a duet.
- The song's instrumental break has been sampled and interpolated in Erasure's "Love to Hate You" (1991), Robbie Williams' "Supreme" (2000), The Pussycat Dolls' "Hush Hush; Hush Hush" (2009) and K-pop girl group Ive's "After Like" (2022).

== In popular culture ==
In 2000, The song featured prominently in the Ally McBeal episode of the same name. Gaynor makes uncredited appearances in a fictionalized version of herself throughout the episode, performing her song both as a hallucination – seen only by Ally McBeal – and as her real self, seen by all attending her performance at a club frequented in the show.

== See also ==
- List of Cash Box Top 100 number-one singles of 1979
