= Blanket on the Ground (album) =

Studio album by Billie Jo Spears
- Released: February 1975
- Recorded: August–November 1974
- Studio: America Studios
- Genre: Country
- Label: United Artists
- Producer: Larry Butler

Billie Jo Spears chronology
Just Singin' (1971)	Blanket on the Ground (1975)	Billie Jo (1975)

Singles from Blanket on the Ground
- 1. "See the Funny Little Clown" Released: September 1974; 2. "Blanket on the Ground" Released: January 1975

Blanket on the Ground is a studio album by American country artist, Billie Jo Spears. It was released in February 1975 via United Artists Records and contained ten tracks. It was the seventh studio album of Spears's music career and her first with the United Artists label. The disc featured mostly ballads, many of which were cover tunes. The album was anchored by its title track, which topped the American country chart and became a pop commercial success in several countries. The disc itself reached the top five of the American country albums chart as well. AllMusic later gave the disc four out of five stars.

== Background and recording ==
Billie Jo Spears had been previously known for 1969 single, "Mr. Walker, It's All Over". The song reached the top five of the country charts and was followed by several more releases on Capitol Records. In 1972, Spears underwent vocal chord surgery and her voice was nearly destroyed. However, she recovered from the surgery and signed with United Artists Records. She then began recording her first United Artists album in 1974 under the direction of producer Larry Butler. Sessions for the album were held between August and 1974 at America Studios, located in Nashville, Tennessee. After finishing the project, Spears did not think Butler would include "Blanket on the Ground" on the track listing. However, Butler surprised Spears by including it and releasing it as a single.

== Content ==
Blanket on the Ground consisted of ten tracks. Along with the title track, other new recordings included "Come on Home", "Then Give Him Back to Me", "All I Want Is You" and "Before Your Time". Remaining tracks were covers of popular American country and pop songs of the era. Among them was Charlie Rich's top ten country single, "Since I Fell for You" and Lynn Anderson's top 20 single, "I've Never Loved Anyone More". Also included is Bobby Goldsboro's top ten pop song, "See the Funny Little Clown". The lesser-known pop song, "Permanently Lonely" (originally recorded by Timi Yuro) is also featured.

== Release, reception and singles ==
Professional ratings
Review scores
Source	Rating
Allmusic	4/5 stars

Blanket on the Ground was released in February 1975 on United Artists Records. It was Spears's seventh studio album and her first with the label. It was distributed as both a vinyl LP and as a cassette. Track listings were identical, with five songs appearing on either side of the discs. The album debuted on the American Billboard Top Country Albums chart in March 1975, peaking at the number four position in May 1975. It was Spears's third album to place on the country albums chart and her first to reach the top ten.

It was later reviewed favorably by Greg Adams of AllMusic, who gave the disc four out of five stars. Adams found that the album's "best cuts" are on "side two". He highlighted tracks like "See the Funny Little Clown" and "Come on Home". He concluded by commenting, "The remaining songs, mostly ballads, are never less than acceptable, but Spears' voice is always a joy to hear and her performances are consistently fine."

Two singles were included on the album. The first was Spears's interpretation of "See the Funny Little Clown" (released by United Artists as a single in September 1974). The song only peaked at number 80 on the Billboard Hot Country Songs chart. The title track was the second single included (first issued by United Artists in January 1975). It became Spears's first (and only) number one song on the Billboard country chart, while also reaching number 78 on the Billboard Hot 100. It also became a pop commercial success in Australia, Ireland and the United Kingdom.

== Track listing ==
Side one
No.	Title	Writer(s)	Length
1.	"Blanket on the Ground"	R. Bowling	2:32
2.	"I Can Only Judge Your Future by His Past"	E. Bruce	2:56
3.	"Then Give Him Back to Me"	R. Bowling; L. Butler	2:43
4.	"Permanently Lonely"	W. Nelson	2:56
5.	"Since I Fell for You"	B. Johnson	3:00

Side two
No.	Title	Writer(s)	Length
1.	"See the Funny Little Clown"	B. Goldsboro	3:10
2.	"Come on Home"	R. Mainegra	2:25
3.	"All I Want Is You"	L. Butler	2:39
4.	"Before Your Time"	J. Chesnut	2:49
5.	"I've Never Loved Anyone More"	L. Hargrove; M. Nesmith	3:30

== Personnel ==
All credits are adapted from the liner notes of Blanket on the Ground.

Musical personnel

- Tommy Allsup – Bass guitar
- Larry Butler – Piano
- Ed Bruce – Rhythm guitar
- Jimmy Capps – Rhythm Guitar
- Jim Colvard – Lead guitar
- Pete Drake – Steel guitar
- Buddy Harman – Drums
- Kenny Malone – Drums
- Bob Moore – Bass
- George Richey – Piano
- Hargus “Pig” Robbins – Piano
- Billie Jo Spears – Lead vocals
- Henry Strzelecki – Bass
- Billy Sanford – Lead guitar

Technical personnel

- Larry Butler – Producer
- Al Clayton – Album photography
- Bill Justis – String arrangement
- The Jordanaires – Background vocals
- Harold Lee – Engineering
- Lloyd Ziff – Art direction

== Chart performance ==
Chart (1975)	Peak position
US Top Country Albums (Billboard)	4

== Certifications ==
Region	Certification	Certified units/sales
United Kingdom (BPI)	Silver	60,000^{^}
^{^} Shipments figures based on certification alone.

== Release history ==
Region	Date	Format	Label	Ref.
Australia	February 1975	Vinyl	United Artists Records	
Europe	February 1975	Vinyl; cassette	United Artists Records	
Germany	February 1975	Vinyl	United Artists Records	
Japan	February 1975	Vinyl	Liberty Records	
North America	February 1975	Vinyl; cassette	United Artists Records	
United Kingdom	February 1975	Cassette	Liberty Records	
