= Miss Sincerity =

Studio album by Billie Jo Spears
- Released: November 1969
- Recorded: June 1969
- Studio: Columbia (Nashville, Tennessee)
- Genre: Country
- Label: Capitol
- Producer: Kelso Herston

Billie Jo Spears chronology
Mr. Walker, It's All Over! (1969)	Miss Sincerity (1969)	With Love, Billie Jo Spears (1970)

Singles from Miss Sincerity
- 1. "Stepchild" Released: August 1969

Miss Sincerity is a studio album by American country artist, Billie Jo Spears. It was released in November 1969 via Capitol Records and contained ten tracks. The disc featured several covers of popular songs of the era, along with several songs about social issues. Among the latter was the track "Stepchild", which was the only single included. Miss Sincerity was Spears's second to make the American country albums chart and was reviewed favorably by critics.

== Background, recording and content ==
In 1969, Billie Jo Spears reached commercial success for the first time with the top five single, "Mr. Walker, It's All Over". Its success inspired Spears and her label to record a series of songs that discussed social issues, including the tracks "Pittsburgh General" and "Stepchild". Both songs were included on Spears's third studio album called Miss Sincerity. The album was produced by Kelso Herston at the Columbia Studios located in Nashville, Tennessee. The sessions were held in June 1969.

Miss Sincerity consisted of ten tracks. Several covers of popular country and pop songs were featured on the album. Among the country songs covered were George Jones's "I'll Share My World with You", Tammy Wynette's "Singing My Song" and Merle Haggard's "Today I Started Loving You Again". Spears also covered Joe South's pop single, "Games People Play". New tracks on the album included "Thing of Pleasure", "Pittsburgh General" and "Stepchild". Similar in theme to that of "Mr. Walker, It's All Over", "Pittsburgh General" raised awareness to the working conditions of hospital nurses. "Stepchild" described the story of a boy who murders his stepfather.

== Release, chart performance, reception and singles ==
Miss Sincerity was released in November 1969 on Capitol Records. It was distributed as a vinyl LP with five songs on either side of the disc. The disc did not enter America's Billboard Top Country Albums until January 1970. It spent a total of three weeks charting, reaching the number 41 position the same month. It was Spears's second album to make the Billboard country chart.

Miss Sincerity received positive reception from critics followings its release. Alan Cackett of Country Music People called it "one of her finest album collections", finding that Spears "brings a touch of her own personality" to each cover tune. Record World magazine gave the disc four out of five stars. Critics highlighted the tracks "Stepchild", "Games People Play" and "I'll Share My World with You". The only single included on the album was "Stepchild". Capitol originally released the track in August 1969. It only reached number 43 on the Billboard Hot Country Songs chart in 1969.

== Track listing ==
Side one
No.	Title	Writer(s)	Length
1.	"Stepchild"	Dallas Frazier	2:44
2.	"I'll Share My World with You"	Ben Wilson	2:28
3.	"Before Your Time"	Jerry Chesnut	2:35
4.	"Today I Started Loving You Again"	Merle Haggard	2:50
5.	"Games People Play"	Joe South	3:05

Side two
No.	Title	Writer(s)	Length
1.	"Softly and Tenderly"	Buddy Lackey; Jack Rhodes	2:46
2.	"Singing My Song"	Billy Sherrill; Glenn Sutton; Tammy Wynette	2:14
3.	"A Thing of Pleasure"	Eddie Rabbitt	2:14
4.	"You'll Never Love Me Now"	Haggard	2:33
5.	"Pittsburgh General"	Gene Crysler	1:53

== Chart performance ==
Chart (1970)	Peak position
US Top Country Albums (Billboard)	41

== Release history ==
Region	Date	Format	Label	Ref.
North America	November 1969	Vinyl	Capitol Records	
