= Silver Wings and Golden Rings =

Single by Billie Jo Spears

from the album Billie Jo
- B-side: "Then Give Him Back to Me"
- Released: September 1975
- Recorded: July 1975
- Studio: Jack Clement Recording (Nashville, Tennessee)
- Genre: Country; Countrypolitan
- Length: 3:25
- Label: United Artists
- Songwriter(s): Molly Ann Leikin; Gloria Sklerov
- Producer(s): Larry Butler

Billie Jo Spears singles chronology
| "Stay Away from the Apple Tree" (1975) | "Silver Wings and Golden Rings" (1975) | "What I've Got in Mind" (1976) |

"Silver Wings and Golden Rings" is a song recorded by American country artist, Billie Jo Spears. It was composed by Molly Ann Leikin and Gloria Sklerov. It was released as a single and reached the top 20 of the North American country charts in 1975. The song was included on Spears's 1975 studio album titled Billie Jo.

== Background and content ==
Billie Jo Spears first had success in the sixties, but returned in 1975 with the crossover single "Blanket on the Ground". The song topped the country charts and in its wake were several top ten and top 20 country releases during the seventies decade. Her third single following "Blanket on the Ground" was "Silver Wings and Golden Rings". It was written by Mary Ann Leikin and Gloria Sklerov. The track was recorded in July 1975 at the Jack Clement Recording Studio, located in Nashville, Tennessee. The session was produced by Larry Butler.

== Release, chart performance and reception ==
"Silver Wings and Golden Rings" was released as a single by United Artists Records in September 1975. It was backed on the B-side by the song, "Then Give Him Back to Me". The disc was distributed as a seven-inch vinyl single. It debuted on the American Billboard Hot Country Songs chart in November 1975. It spent a total of 15 weeks on the country chart, peaking at the number 20 position in January 1976. It was Spears's fifth single in her career to reach the Billboard country top 20. On Canada's RPM Country chart, the single reached number 12. It was Spears's second single to reach the Australian pop chart, peaking at number 99 in 1975. It was one of two singles featured on her second studio album with the United Artists label titled Billie Jo. The album was released in October 1975.

== Track listing ==
7" vinyl single

- "Silver Wings and Golden Rings" – 3:25
- "Then Give Him Back to Me" – 2:40

== Charts ==
Weekly chart performance for "Silver Wings and Golden Rings"
| Chart (1975) | Peak position |
|---|---|
| Australia (Kent Music Report) | 99 |
| Canada Country Tracks (RPM) | 12 |
| US Hot Country Songs (Billboard) | 20 |
