= Rainy Days and Stormy Nights =

Single by Billie Jo Spears

from the album I Will Survive
- B-side: "Everyday I Have to Cry"
- Released: October 1979
- Recorded: February 1979
- Studio: Jack Clement Recording (Nashville, Tennessee)
- Genre: Country
- Label: United Artists
- Songwriter(s): Charlie Craig
- Producer(s): Larry Butler

Billie Jo Spears singles chronology
| "Livin' Our Love Together" (1979) | "Rainy Days and Stormy Nights" (1979) | "Standing Tall" (1980) |

"Rainy Days and Stormy Nights" is a song written by Charlie Craig that was originally recorded by American country artist Billie Jo Spears. The track was one of three singles spawned from her 1979 studio album titled I Will Survive. The song reached the top 30 of the American country chart and the top 20 of the Canadian country chart.

== Background and recording ==
Billie Jo Spears had her most commercially successful period during the latter half of the seventies decade. Among her popular recordings was the chart-topping "Blanket on the Ground" and the top ten singles "What I've Got in Mind", "Misty Blue" and "If You Want Me". She also had a series of top 20 singles and some that reached lower charting positions. Among her top 40 singles of this era was 1979's "Rainy Days and Stormy Nights". The song was composed by Charlie Craig and was recorded in February 1979 at the Jack Clement Recording Studio, located in Nashville, Tennessee. It was produced by Larry Butler.

== Release, chart performance and critical reception ==
"Rainy Days and Stormy Nights" was first included as an album track on Spears's studio album, I Will Survive. The album was first issued in May 1979. It was then spawned as a single by United Artists Records. Spending three weeks on the chart, it climbed to the number 24 position by January 1978 Artists Records as a single in October 1979. It was backed on the B-side by the track "Everyday I Have to Cry". It was issued by the label as a seven-inch vinyl disc.

The single entered America's Billboard Hot Country Songs chart in November 1979 and spent 14 weeks there. It eventually peaked in the top 30, rising to number 21 by January 1980. It reached the top 20 of the Canadian RPM Country Tracks chart, peaking at number 18. "Rainy Days and Stormy Nights" received positive reception from critics. Billboard magazine named it among its "Top Single Picks" in October 1979, calling its production "catchy and uptempo", while calling Spears's vocals "soft" and "huskier than usual". In reviewing her I Will Survive album, Greg Adams of AllMusic praised it as being of the disc's track highlights.

== Track listing ==
7" vinyl single

- "Rainy Days and Stormy Nights" – 2:35
- "Everyday I Have to Cry" – 2:40

== Charts ==
Weekly chart performance for "Rainy Days and Stormy Nights"
| Chart (1978–1979) | Peak position |
|---|---|
| Canada Country Tracks (RPM) | 18 |
| US Hot Country Songs (Billboard) | 21 |
