= Mr. Walker, It's All Over! =

Studio album by Billie Jo Spears
- Released: May 1969
- Recorded: January 1969
- Studio: Columbia (Nashville, Tennessee)
- Genre: Country; country pop
- Label: Capitol
- Producer: Kelso Herston

Billie Jo Spears chronology
The Voice of Billie Jo Spears (1968)	Mr. Walker, It's All Over! (1969)	Miss Sincerity (1969)

Singles from Mr. Walker It's All Over!
- 1. "Mr. Walker, It's All Over" Released: March 1969

Mr. Walker, It's All Over! is a studio album by American country artist, Billie Jo Spears. It was released in May 1969 on Capitol Records. It was the second studio album of Spears's career and her second with Capitol. The disc contained 11 tracks that mixed both original material with cover tunes. The title track was the only single featured on the disc. The song reached the top ten of the North American country charts, while also climbing to minor chart positions on the pop charts. The album itself reached charting positions on the American country survey. AllMusic gave the disc four of five stars in its review of the album.

== Background and recording ==
Billie Jo Spears had been attempting to have commercial success in the country genre. After a failed run of singles on United Artists Records, she moved to Capitol Records with the assistance of producer, Kelso Herston. It was at Capitol that Spears broke through with the top ten single, "Mr. Walker, It's All Over". The song would serve as the name for Spears's second studio album on the Capitol label. The project was recorded at the Columbia Studios, located in Nashville, Tennessee. Sessions were produced by Kelso Herston in January 1969.

== Content ==
Mr. Walker, It's All Over! was a collection of 11 tracks. Compositions featured writing credits from Dallas Frazier, Ed Bruce, Merle Haggard and Spears's friend, Jack Rhodes. According to the liner notes, the album was a concept project that focused on songs about working women and women overcoming obstacles with male partners. The title track was among these songs, which described how a New York City secretary faces sexual harassment and discrimination in the work place. A similar song about secretaries was the track, "The Price I Pay to Stay". In the song, "Tips and Tables", a woman is characterized as a "deserted young mother". Spears also covers Tammy Wynette's number one country single, "Stand by Your Man", and Johnny Nash's top 40 pop single, "Hold Me Tight".

== Release, chart performance, reception and singles ==
Professional ratings
Review scores
Source	Rating
Allmusic	4/5 stars

Mr. Walker, It's All Over! was released by Capitol Records in May 1969. It was the second studio album released in Spears's career and her second with the Capitol label. It was distributed as a vinyl LP, featuring six songs on "Side A" and five songs on "Side B". The disc debuted on America's Billboard Top Country LP's chart in May 1969. It spent a total of six weeks there, reaching the number 26 position by June 1969. It was Spears's first studio album to enter the chart and its highest-charting album until 1975.

Mr. Walker, It's All Over! received a positive response from AllMusic's Greg Adams, who rated it four out of five stars. Adams found that the title track not the only quality track on the disc: "The rest of the album is by no means filler. It's a quite strong set of material, hewing to the gutsier side of late-'60s country-pop, with Spears proving herself as one of the tougher, harder-edged, commercial country singers of the era." The only single included was the title track and was originally issued by Capitol in March 1969. The song climbed to number four on the Billboard Hot Country Songs chart, number 80 on the Billboard Hot 100, number ten on Canada's RPM Country chart and number 85 on the RPM Top Singles chart.

== Track listing ==
Side one
No.	Title	Writer(s)	Length
1.	"Mr. Walker, It's All Over"	Gene Crysler	2:59
2.	"Keep Me from Cryin' Today"	Merle Haggard	2:42
3.	"Look Out Your Window"	Bob Milsap; Jack Rhodes	2:39
4.	"Tips and Tables"	Henry Ebner; Rhodes	2:54
5.	"Stand by Your Man"	Billy Sherrill; Tammy Wynette	2:30
6.	"Hold Me Tight"	Johnny Nash	2:10

Side two
No.	Title	Writer(s)	Length
1.	"That Man"	Jerry Foster; Bill Rice	2:33
2.	"My Arms Stay Open Late"	Dan Lomax; Curly Putman	2:10
3.	"Thanks for Hangin' Round, World"	Buddy Lacky; Rhodes	2:20
4.	"You Couldn't Even Light His Candle"	Dallas Frazier	2:25
5.	"The Price I Pay to Stay"	Ed Bruce	2:10

== Chart performance ==
Chart (1969)	Peak position
US Top Country Albums (Billboard)	26

== Release history ==
Region	Date	Format	Label	Ref.
North America	May 1969	Vinyl	Capitol Records	
