= Unmistakably =

Studio album by Billie Jo Spears
- Released: 1991
- Studio: Reflections Studio
- Genre: Country
- Labels: Broadland; Etude
- Producer: Gary Buck

Billie Jo Spears chronology
| Billie Jo Spears (1986) | Unmistakably (1991) | Outlaw Woman (1996) |

Singles from Unmistakably
- 1. "One Smokey Rose" Released: 1991

Unmistakably is a studio album by American country artist Billie Jo Spears. It was released in 1991 via Broadland International Records and Etude Records. It was the twenty second studio album of Spears's career and contained ten tracks of original material. Among its songs was the single "One Smokey Rose". The album was met with a positive review from RPM magazine after its release.

== Background, recording and content ==
Billie Jo Spears had a series of popular country singles during the 1970s including "Blanket on the Ground" and "What I've Got in Mind". After leaving her long-time record label, she focused her attention towards the British market where she had some of her greatest commercial success. She released two studio albums during the eighties through British labels including We Just Came Apart at the Dreams (1984). In the early 1990s, Spears was approached by producer Gary Buck who was starting his own record label called Broadland International. In 1991, he announced that Spears would be the first performer to record and release a studio album through the label.

Unmistakably was recorded in 1991 at the Reflections Studio located in Nashville, Tennessee. All sessions were produced by Gary Buck. The disc was a collection of ten songs. The album featured several tracks penned by Canadian musicians and songwriters. Tim Taylor penned tracks "One Smokey Rose" and "Mutual Acquaintance". Saskatoon songwriters Brian and Aaron Sklar wrote "It Won't Be Long".

== Release, reception and singles ==
Prior to the album's release, Broadland issued the single "One Smokey Rose". The song and album were promoted with an appearance on the television program Nashville Now where it "won hands down through applause meters", according to RPM. Unmistakably was then released in 1991 on Broadland International Records and Etude Records. It was distributed as a compact disc. It was the twenty second studio album of Spears's career. RPM magazine gave it a positive review in 1991: "Producer Buck has added that ingredient of professionalism on the board that brings out the best in this seasoned country artist". In a separate review, Cashbox magazine commented, "Her name alone speaks for itself, but long-time-no-hear-from Billie Jo Spears bounces back on the scene with a taste of what's credited her as being one of country music's most authentic female vocalists."

== Track listing ==
The track listing is adapted from the liner notes of Unmistakably. Song lengths are not included in the liner notes.

1. "Every Time I Close My Eyes" – (Jerry Reid)
2. "One Smokey Rose" – (Tim Taylor)
3. "Mutual Acquaintance" – (Tim Taylor)
4. "I Got on This Train to Ride" – (Judy Fields)
5. "If Wishes Were Wings" – (Hunter, Whiting, Miller)
6. "We Need to Walk" – (Mel Tillis)
7. "Keep Me from Dreamin'" – (Jerry Reid)
8. "The Star" – (Lee Bach, Mercey Brothers)
9. "We're Over" – (Jerry Reid)
10. "It Won't Be Long" – (Brian Sklar, Arron Sklar)

== Personnel ==
All credits are adapted from the liner notes of Unmistakably.

Musical and technical personnel

- Lea Jane Berinati – Background vocals
- Gary Buck – Producer
- Greg Galbrieth – Lead guitar
- Sonny Garrish – Dobro, steel guitar
- Rob Hajacos – Fiddle
- Leo Jackson – Acoustic guitar
- Ronny Light – Keyboards
- Rodger Morris – Keyboards
- Judy Rodman – Background vocals
- Milton Sledge – Drums
- Billie Jo Spears – Lead vocals
- Glenn Worf – Bass

== Release history ==
| Region | Date | Format | Label | Ref. |
|---|---|---|---|---|
| North America | 1991 | Compact disc | Broadland International Records; Etude Records | |
