= Just Singin' =

Studio album by Billie Jo Spears
- Released: February 1971
- Recorded: November 1970
- Studio: Jack Clement Recording (Nashville, Tennessee)
- Genre: Country
- Label: Capitol
- Producer: George Richey

Billie Jo Spears chronology
| Country Girl (1970) | Just Singin' (1971) | Blanket on the Ground (1975) |

Just Singin is a studio album by American country artist, Billie Jo Spears. It was released in February 1971 via Capitol Records and contained ten tracks. The album featured mostly cover recordings of popular country songs from the time period. Just Singin' was met with mixed reviews from critics following its release. It was her final album with the Capitol label.

== Background and recording ==
Billie Jo Spears broke through to country music success with 1969's "Mr. Walker, It's All Over". The song reached the top ten of the country charts and a series of recordings followed in its wake on Capitol Records. Several studio albums followed between 1969 and 1971 on the Capitol label including 1971's Just Singin'. The album was recorded in November 1970 at the Jack Clement Recording Studio, located in Nashville, Tennessee. The recording sessions were produced by George Richey, who had produced Spears's previous two albums.

== Content ==
Just Singin consisted of ten tracks. Most of the disc's recordings were covers of popular country songs from the era. Included were covers of three number one Billboard country songs: Leon Payne's "I Love You Because", Sammi Smith's "Help Me Make It Through the Night", Ray Price's chart-topping "For the Good Times". Several other charting Billboard country singles were also covered by Spears: Faron Young's "Goin' Steady", Tammy Wynette's "Apartment No. 9", Anne Murray's "Snowbird" and Ferlin Husky's "Heavenly Sunshine". Three new tracks were also included: "When You Hurt Me More Than I Love You", "I Just Can't Get Enough of You" and "Trying to See".

== Release and critical reception ==
Professional ratings
Review scores
| Source | Rating |
|---|---|
| Allmusic | 3/5 stars |

Just Singin was released by Capitol Records in February 1971. It was the sixth studio album of Spears's career. It was distributed as a vinyl LP, with five recordings on either side of the disc. No singles were issued from the album and it would prove unsuccessful. Spears would be dropped from Capitol Records the following year. Just Singin received mixed reviews from critics. Billboard commented that "the tunes are strong" and highlighted several covers featured on the disc. Alan Cackett of Country Music People found the album was "handled with poise and professionalism". Meanwhile, Richie Unterberger of AllMusic gave the album three out of five stars. "Billie Jo Spears' 1972 album Just Singin perhaps relies too heavily on covers of big country hits to make the kind of individual impact this richly talented vocalist deserved."

== Track listing ==
Side one
| No. | Title | Writer(s) | Original artist | Length |
|---|---|---|---|---|
| 1. | "Snowbird" | Gene MacLellan | Anne Murray | 2:11 |
| 2. | "Apartment No. 9" | Bobby Austin; Johnny Paycheck | Bobby Austin | 2:41 |
| 3. | "For the Good Times" | Kris Kristofferson | Ray Price | 3:45 |
| 4. | "When You Hurt Me More (Than I Love You)" | Jerry Foster | Billie Jo Spears | 2:27 |
| 5. | "Heavenly Sunshine" | George Richey; Glenn Sutton | Ferlin Husky | 2:30 |

Side two
| No. | Title | Writer(s) | Original artist | Length |
|---|---|---|---|---|
| 1. | "Trying to See" | Bobby Braddock | Billie Jo Spears | 2:10 |
| 2. | "Help Me Make It Through the Night" | Kris Kristofferson | Sammi Smith | 2:46 |
| 3. | "I Can't Get Enough of You" | Jimmy Peppers | Billie Jo Spears | 2:27 |
| 4. | "I Love You Because" | Leon Payne | Leon Payne | 2:52 |
| 5. | "Goin' Steady" | Faron Young | Faron Young | 2:15 |

== Release history ==
| Region | Date | Format | Label | Ref. |
|---|---|---|---|---|
| North America | February 1971 | Vinyl | Capitol Records | |
