= Marty Gray =

Single by Billie Jo Spears

from the album Country Girl
- B-side: "True Love"
- Released: June 1970
- Recorded: April 1970
- Studio: Jack Clement Recording (Nashville, Tennessee)
- Genre: Country
- Length: 2:43
- Label: Capitol
- Songwriter(s): Walter Woodward
- Producer(s): George Richey

Billie Jo Spears singles chronology
"Midnight Train" (1970)	"Marty Gray" (1970)	"I Stayed Long Enough" (1970)

"Marty Gray" is a song written by Walter Woodward that was recorded by American country artist, Billie Jo Spears. Released as a single in 1970, the song reached the top 20 of the American country chart. The song's theme centered around teen pregnancy and was among several recordings Spears recorded about social challenges. The track appeared on Spears's studio album, Country Girl.

== Background, content and recording ==
In 1969, Billie Jo Spears had her first commercial success with the song, "Mr. Walker, It's All Over". The song was about sexual harassment in the work place and would inspire a series of follow-up recordings that addressed social issues. Among them was the song "Marty Gray", which described a girl named Marty Gray who had an unexpected teenage pregnancy with a boy named Jimmy Barker. The song was composed by Walter Woodward and was recorded by Billie Jo Spears in April 1970. The session was produced by George Richey at the Jack Clement Recording Studio in Nashville, Tennessee.

== Release and chart performance ==
"Marty Gray" was released as a single by Capitol Records in June 1969. It was backed on the B-side by a cover of Cole Porter's "True Love". It was distributed as a seven-inch vinyl record. The track entered the American Billboard Hot Country Songs chart in July 1970. Spending 14 weeks there, it peaked at number 17 in September 1970. It became the second song of Spears's to enter the Billboard top 20. On Canada's RPM Country Tracks survey, the song reached the number 27 position. It was her third charting single in Canada. "Marty Gray" was included on Spears's 1970 studio album titled Country Girl.

== Track listing ==
7" vinyl single

- "Marty Gray" – 2:43
- "True Love" – 2:28

== Charts ==
=== Weekly charts ===
Weekly chart performance for "Marty Gray"
Chart (1970)	Peak position
Canada Country Tracks (RPM)	27
US Hot Country Songs (Billboard)	17
