= Billie Jo =

Studio album by Billie Jo Spears
- Released: October 1975
- Recorded: July 1975
- Studio: Jack Clement Recording Studio
- Genre: Country
- Label: United Artists
- Producer: Larry Butler

Billie Jo Spears chronology
Blanket on the Ground (1975)	Billie Jo (1975)	What I've Got in Mind (1976)

Singles from Billie Jo
- 1. "Stay Away from the Apple Tree" Released: May 1975; 2. "Silver Wings and Golden Rings" Released: September 1975

Billie Jo is a studio album by American country artist, Billie Jo Spears. It was released in October 1975 via United Artists Records and contained ten tracks. A mixture of new recordings and cover tunes were featured on the disc. Among them were the singles, "Stay Away from the Apple Tree" and "Silver Wings and Golden Rings". Both singles reached the top 20 of the North American country charts in 1975. The album itself reached the top 50 of the American country albums chart. It was the eighth studio album of Spears's career and her second with the United Artists label.

== Background and recording ==
In 1975, Billie Jo Spears had a comeback with the number one country single "Blanket on the Ground". The song set forth a series of singles and albums that were issued by United Artists Records during the seventies decade. Billie Jo was the first studio album that immediately followed "Blanket on the Ground" and its subsequent album. The project was recorded at the Jack Clement Recording Studio in Nashville, Tennessee. It was produced by Larry Butler in July 1975.

== Content ==
Billie Jo consisted of ten tracks. It mixed both original recordings with covers of previously recorded material. Several of the new tracks featured writing credits from producer Larry Butler. This included "Stay Away from the Apple Tree" and Spears's cover of "(Hey Won't You Play) Another Somebody Done Somebody Wrong Song". Other new songs included "We Love Each Other", "Enough for You" and "But I Do". Also included is the song "Every Time Two Fools Collide", which was first cut by Spears for this project. In 1978, it would be recorded as a duet by Kenny Rogers and Dottie West. Their version would top the Billboard country chart. Other covers included the American pop single "Hurt" and Tanya Tucker's number one Billboard country single "Lizzie and the Rainman".

== Release, reception, chart performance and singles ==
Professional ratings
Review scores
Source	Rating
Allmusic	4/5 stars

Billie Jo was released by United Artists Records in October 1975. It was Spears's second studio album with United Artists and her eighth studio album overall. The label originally distributed it as a vinyl LP, with five songs on each side of the disc. The album was met with mixed reviews. James Chrispell of AllMusic gave Billie Jo four out of five stars and called it "another fine effort". Alan Cackett of Country Music People magazine called it "a disappointment". Cackett further commented, "As a country album, indeed, it rates pretty average. Billie Jo sounds very disenchanted with life if the content of these songs is anything to go by." Billie Jo entered the American Billboard Top Country Albums chart in November 1975. After seven weeks, it only reached number 45 on the chart.

Two singles were included on the disc. The first single released was "Stay Away from the Apple Tree", which United Artists first issued in May 1975. It reached number 20 on the Billboard Hot Country Songs chart by the time its corresponding album was issued in October 1975. On the Canadian RPM Country Tracks survey, it reached the number 17 position. "Silver Wings and Golden Rings" was then spawned from the album as a single in September 1975. It also reached the number 20 position on the Billboard country chart, peaking at the position in January 1976. On the RPM Country Tracks chart, it climber to number 12.

== Track listing ==
Side one
No.	Title	Writer(s)	Length
1.	"Stay Away from the Apple Tree"	L. Butler; R. Bowling	2:46
2.	"Lizzie and the Rainman"	L. Henley; K. O'Dell	3:30
3.	"Hurt"	J. Crane; A. Jacobs	3:14
4.	"We Still Love in Mind"	R. Bowling; M. Jackson; G. Richey	3:03
5.	"Enough for You"	K. Kristofferson	2:45

Side two
No.	Title	Writer(s)	Length
1.	"Silver Wings and Golden Rings"	M. A. Leikin; G. Sklerov	3:25
2.	"We Love Each Other"	B. Killen	2:48
3.	"But I Do"	D. Parkinson; T. Seals	3:01
4.	"(Hey Won't You Play) Another Somebody Done Somebody Wrong Song"	L. Butler; C. Moman	3:24
5.	"Every Time Two Fools Collide"	J. Dryer; J. Tweel	2:52

== Personnel ==
All credits are adapted from the liner notes of Billie Jo.

Musical personnel

- Bob Moore, Henry Strzelecki – bass guitar
- Hargus "Pig" Robbins, George Richey, Bobby Wood – piano
- Karl Himmel, Jerry Carrigan, Kenny Malone – drums
- Billy Sanford, Grady Martin, Reggie Young – lead guitar
- Kelso Herston, Pete Wade, Billy Sanford, Reggie Young – rhythm guitar
- Tommy Allsup – bass
- Pete Drake – steel guitar
- Charles "Chuck" Cochran – Moog synthesizer
- The Jordanaires – backing vocals

Technical personnel

- Produced by Larry Butler
- Recorded at Jack Clement Recording Studio, Nashville, Tennessee
- Strings Arranged by Bill Justis
- Sound Engineers – Garth Fundis (Tracks 2–10) & Billy Sherrill (Track 1)
- Album photograph – Walden S. Fabry
- Album design – Bob Cato

== Chart performance ==
Chart (1975)	Peak position
US Top Country Albums (Billboard)	45

== Release history ==
Region	Date	Format	Label	Ref.
Netherlands	October 1975	United Artists Records	Vinyl	
Germany	October 1975	United Artists Records	Vinyl	
Japan	October 1975	Liberty Records	Vinyl	
North America	October 1975	United Artists Records	Vinyl	
Saudi Arabia	October 1975	IMD	Cassette	
United Kingdom	October 1975	United Artists Records	Vinyl	
