= I Stayed Long Enough =

1969 song by Tammy Wynette

Song by Tammy Wynette

from the album Stand by Your Man
- Released: January 1969
- Studio: Columbia Studio B (Nashville, Tennessee)
- Genre: Nashville Sound
- Length: 2:01
- Label: Epic
- Songwriter(s): Tammy Wynette
- Producer(s): Billy Sherrill

"I Stayed Long Enough" is a song written and originally recorded by American country artist, Tammy Wynette. It first appeared as an album track on Wynette's 1969 album, Stand by Your Man. It was then recorded and released as a single by American country artist, Billie Jo Spears. Her version reached the top 40 of the American country chart in 1970.

== Tammy Wynette version ==
Tammy Wynette had becoming one of the country genre's most successful artists by the sixties. She had several singles top the country chart and reach the top ten. Among these songs was her signature 1969 recording of "Stand by Your Man". "I Stayed Long Enough" was recorded around the same time as her signature tune. The track was recorded some time between March and August 1968 at the Columbia Studio B in Nashville, Tennessee. It was produced by Billy Sherrill. Additionally, the song was composed by Tammy Wynette. The song was later included on Wynette's studio album, Stand by Your Man. The disc was released in January 1969.

== Billie Jo Spears version ==
"I Stayed Long Enough"

Single by Billie Jo Spears

from the album Country Girl
- B-side: "Come on Home"
- Released: October 1970
- Recorded: June 1970
- Studio: Jack Clement Recording (Nashville, Tennessee)
- Genre: Country
- Length: 2:12
- Label: Capitol
- Songwriter(s): Tammy Wynette
- Producer(s): George Richey

Billie Jo Spears singles chronology
"Marty Gray" (1970)	"I Stayed Long Enough" (1970)	"It Could 'A Been Me" (1971)

=== Background, recording, and release ===
Billie Jo Spears had recently obtained commercial success with her first top ten country hit, "Mr. Walker, It's All Over". She followed the song with a series of charting singles, all of which were issued on the Capitol Records label. Among her charting singles was "I Stayed Long Enough". The song was recorded at the Jack Clement Recording Studio, located in Nashville, Tennessee. It was produced by George Richey in June 1970.

"I Stayed Long Enough" was released as a single by Capitol Records in October 1970. It was backed on the B-side by the song, "Come on Home". The disc was issued as a seven-inch vinyl single. The song entered America's Billboard Hot Country Songs in November 1970. It spent a total of nine weeks there, reaching the number 30 position in December 1970. It became Spears's fourth top 40 single on the country survey. The song was later included on Spears's 1970 studio album, Country Girl.

=== Track listing ===
7" vinyl single

- "I Stayed Long Enough" – 2:12
- "Come on Home" – 2:23

=== Charts ===
Weekly chart performance for "I Stayed Long Enough"
Chart (1970)	Peak position
US Hot Country Songs (Billboard)	30
