= It Could 'A Been Me =

Single by Billie Jo Spears
- B-side: "Break Away"
- Released: February 1971
- Recorded: January 1971
- Studio: Jack Clement Recording Studio
- Genre: Country
- Length: 2:55
- Label: Capitol
- Songwriter(s): Jerry Chesnut; Walter Woodward
- Producer(s): George Richey

Billie Jo Spears singles chronology
"I Stayed Long Enough" (1970)	"It Could 'A Been Me" (1971)	"Souvenirs and California Memories" (1971)

"It Could 'A Been Me" is a song recorded by American country artist, Billie Jo Spears. It was composed by Jerry Chesnut and Walter Woodward. Released as a single, the track reached the top 30 of the American country chart in 1971. It was among several top 40 singles Spears had in the late sixties and early seventies decades.

== Background, recording and release ==
Billie Jo Spears had her first chart success with 1969's "Mr. Walker, It's All Over". The song reached the top ten of the country charts and was followed by several more charting singles. Among these charting songs was "It Could 'A Been Me". The song was co-written by Jerry Chesnut and Walter Woodward. Spears recorded the track at the Jack Clement Studio in Nashville, Tennessee. The session was held in January 1971 and was produced by George Richey.

"It Could 'A Been Me" was released as a single by Capitol Records in February 1971. It was backed on the B-side by the track, "Break Away". It was distributed as a seven-inch vinyl single. The track entered America's Billboard Hot Country Songs chart in March 1971. It spent a total of 12 weeks and reached the number 23 position by May 1971. It became her fifth single to place in the Hot Country Songs top 40.

== Track listing ==
7" vinyl single

- "It Could 'A Been Me" – 2:55
- "Break Away" – 2:22

== Charts ==
Weekly chart performance for "It Could 'A Been Me"
Chart (1971)	Peak position
US Hot Country Songs (Billboard)	23
