= I Will Survive (Billie Jo Spears album) =

Studio album by Billie Jo Spears
- Released: May 1979
- Recorded: February 1979
- Studio: Jack Clement Recording, Nashville, Tennessee
- Genre: Country; Disco; pop
- Label: United Artists
- Producer: Larry Butler

Billie Jo Spears chronology
Love Ain’t Gonna Wait For Us (1978)	I Will Survive (1979)	The Billie Jo Spears Singles Album (1979)

Singles from I Will Survive
- 1. "I Will Survive" Released: March 1979; 2. "Livin' Our Love Together" Released: July 1979; 3. "Rainy Days and Stormy Nights" Released: October 1979

I Will Survive is a studio album by American country artist Billie Jo Spears. It was released in May 1979 via United Artists Records and contained ten tracks. It was the fifteenth studio album of her career. The album project was contained new recordings, along with several cover tunes. Among these covers was Gloria Gaynor's "I Will Survive". Spears's version was released as the album's lead single, reaching the top 50 of the UK pop chart, the top 30 of the American country chart and the top ten of the Canadian country chart. It was followed by two more singles that year. The album was given positive reviews by critics.

== Background ==
Billie Jo Spears found her greatest commercial success recording for United Artists Records in the 1970s. She topped the charts with 1975's "Blanket on the Ground" and the top ten with 1976's "What I've Got in Mind" (among others). A series of further singles reached the top 20 through the early eighties. Among her singles was a cover of Gloria Gaynor's Disco song "I Will Survive". The single would inspire the name and production of Spears's next United Artists album. The single and album was produced by Larry Butler. Sessions were held in February 1979 at the Jack Clement Recording Studio in Nashville, Tennessee.

== Recording and content ==
According to Larry Butler, the project was stemmed from the musical style of the title track. The songs chosen to complete the album were mostly uptempo tracks. Butler explained his disappointment in her last few recordings and decided this time not to "hold anything back". The album was a collection of ten songs in total. Along with the title track, Spears also covered Arthur Alexander's R&B single "Everyday I Have to Cry" and Hot's "Angel in Your Arms". Remaining songs on the album project were new recordings, such as "It Should Have Been Easy", "You", "Livin' Our Love Together", "Happily Ever After" (co-written by Larry Butler) and "Rainy Days and Stormy Nights".

== Release and critical reception ==
I Will Survive was released by United Artists Records in May 1979. It was the fifteenth studio album of Spears's career. The label distributed it as both a vinyl LP and a cassette. It was positively praised by Cash Box magazine shortly after its released. Reviewers called it "the best record every cut" by Spears. They also noted its country, disco and pop influences. Additionally, the magazine wrote, "She still sings country, but producer Larry Butler has added just enough pop and disco flavor to the arrangements to make the LP appetizing to country and pop listeners." In later years, Greg Adams of AllMusic gave the album four out five stars. "I Will Survive didn't quite make the country album Top 40 but is a typically fine effort from one of the most distinctive and consistently enjoyable country singers of the 1970s," he explained.

== Singles ==
A total of three singles were spawned from I Will Survive. The lead single was the title track, which was first issued by United Artists in March 1979. It later reached number 21 on the American Billboard Hot Country Songs chart. On the Canadian RPM Country Tracks chart, it reached the top ten, rising to the number nine position. On the UK Singles Chart, it reached number 47. "Livin' Our Love Together" was spawned as the album's second single in July 1979. It reached number 23 on the Billboard country chart and number 38 on the RPM country chart. The third and final single was "Rainy Days and Stormy Nights", which United Artists released in October 1979. It also reached the number 21 position on the Billboard country chart, while climbing to number 18 on the RPM country chart.

== Track listing ==
Side one
No.	Title	Writer(s)	Length
1.	"I Will Survive"	D. Fekaris; F. Perren	3:16
2.	"Angel in Your Arms"	T. Brasfield; C. Ivey; T. Woodford	3:25
3.	"Everyday I Have to Cry"	A. Alexander	2:40
4.	"It Should Have Been Easy"	B. McDill	2:49
5.	"I'm Good at What I Do"	J. McCracken	2:40

Side two
No.	Title	Writer(s)	Length
1.	"Livin' Our Love Together"	B. Peters	2:45
2.	"I Think I'll Go Home"	J. Allen	3:16
3.	"You"	D. Allen; R. V. Hoy	3:15
4.	"Happily Ever After"	R. Bowling; L. Butler; S. Richey	2:54
5.	"Rainy Days and Stormy Nights"	C. Craig	2:35

== Personnel ==
All credits are adapted from the liner notes of I Will Survive.

Musical personnel

- Pete Wade, Ray Edenton, Steven Curtis Chapman, Jimmy Capps, Billy Sanford, Chip Young – guitar
- Jim Vest – steel guitar
- Tommy Allsup, Bob Moore – bass guitar
- Hargus "Pig" Robbins – keyboards
- Stanley Chase, Jerry Carrigan – percussion
- Sheldon Kurland, Byron Bach, George Binkley, Marvin Chantry, Roy Christensen, Carl Gorodetzky, Lennie Haight, Wilfred Lehmann, Steven Smith, Gary Vanosdale – strings
- Bill Justis – string arrangements
- The Jordanaires – backing vocals

Technical personnel

- Larry Butler – Producer
- Billy Sherrill – Engineer
- Glenn Meadows – Mastering
- Vegas Burks – Album Art Direction
- Hoot Gibson – Photography
- Tex Lank – Album Design

== Release history ==
Region	Date	Format	Label	Ref.
Australia	May 1979	Vinyl LP	United Artists Records	
Japan	May 1979	Vinyl LP	United Artists Records	
Netherlands	May 1979	Vinyl LP	United Artists Records	
Portugal	May 1979	Vinyl LP	United Artists Records	
North America	May 1979	Vinyl LP; cassette	United Artists Records	
United Kingdom	May 1979	Vinyl LP	United Artists Records	
