= Inspiration (Tammy Wynette album) =

Studio album by Tammy Wynette
- Released: March 1969
- Recorded: October 1968
- Studio: Columbia Studio B (Nashville, Tennessee)
- Genre: Country; inspirational
- Label: Epic
- Producer: Billy Sherrill

Tammy Wynette chronology
Stand by Your Man (1969)	Inspiration (1969)	The Ways to Love a Man (1970)

Inspiration is a studio album by American country artist Tammy Wynette. It was released in March 1969 via Epic Records and contained 11 tracks. It was Wynette's first collection of inspirational music and her sixth studio album issued in her career. All of the album's songs were covers of gospel and other inspirational songs. It was received positively by several reviewers and charted on the American Country LP's chart following its original release.

== Background, recording and content ==
Tammy Wynette was among country music's most popular artists during the 1960s and 1970s. Between 1968 and 1969 alone, she had five singles reach the top of the American country songs chart. Among these songs was 1969's "Stand by Your Man", which became her most commercially successful single. Epic Records released six studio albums by Wynette between 1969 and 1970. Following the Stand by Your Man LP, the label released Wynette's first album of religious music titled Inspiration. The album was recorded in October 1968 at the Columbia Studio B in Nashville, Tennessee. Billy Sherrill served as the producer for the album's recording sessions.

According to critic Thom Jurek, the album's traditional, religious material was modernized with a country pop production style. Jurek noted an emphasis on instruments such as the pedal steel guitar, fiddle and "honky tonk upright pianos". Inspiration consisted of 11 tracks, all of which were covers of hymns or other inspirational numbers. The album opens with a cover of Rodgers and Hammerstein's "You'll Never Walk Alone". Among its other covers are "Battle Hymn of the Republic", "How Great Thou Art" and "I Believe".

== Release and reception ==
Professional ratings
Review scores
Source	Rating
Allmusic	3/5 stars

Inspiration was originally released by Epic Records in March 1969. It was the sixth studio album of Wynette's career. The label initially issued it as a vinyl LP, containing five selections on "side A" and six selections on "side B". In 1998, the album was reissued by Ranwood Records and Sony Music. The labels offered the album as both a cassette and a compact disc. A bonus track was also featured, which was Wynette's version of the hymn, "Precious Memories". It was reissued again in 2019 by Epic and Sony Legacy in a digital form. The album reached the American Billboard Top Country Albums chart following its original release, peaking at number 19 in May 1969. On the Billboard 200, it reached number 189 during the same time period.

The album received positive reception by writers and critics. In April 1969, Billboard magazine called it a "beautiful" and "inspiring" album. The publication also highlighted Wynette's singing, calling her vocal performance to have a "touch and go teardrop voice". Biographer Jimmy McDonough called it "a riveting collection of gospel numbers". He also noted that Wynette herself considered it among her most favorite album projects in her career. AllMusic's Thom Jurek gave the album three out of five stars. He found some selections to "pale in comparison" to the album's opener, "You'll Never Walk Alone". He also found other selections to be so "awe-inspiring" that they would make "a Buddhist reconsider". Jurek concluded by saying, "This album may not appeal to everyone, but for those willing to consider it on its own terms, it's a gem."

== Track listings ==
=== Vinyl version ===
Side one
No.	Title	Writer(s)	Length
1.	"You'll Never Walk Alone"	Richard Rodgers; Oscar Hammerstein II	2:42
2.	"Count Your Blessings Instead of Sheep"	Irving Berlin	2:35
3.	"Just a Closer Walk with Thee"	Traditional	3:15
4.	"I Believe"	Ervin Drake; Irvin Graham; Jimmy Shirl; Al Stillman	2:12
5.	"Battle Hymn of the Republic"	Julia Ward Howe; William Steffe	2:49

Side two
No.	Title	Writer(s)	Length
1.	"How Great Thou Art"	Stuart K. Hine	3:35
2.	"He's Got the Whole World in His Hands"	Traditional	2:35
3.	"It Is No Secret (What God Can Do)"	Stuart Hamblen	2:27
4.	"Crying in the Chapel"	Artie Glenn	2:23
5.	"He"	Richard Mullan; Jack Richards	3:05
6.	"May the Good Lord Bless and Keep You"	Meredith Willson	2:58

=== CD version ===
Inspiration (compact disc)
No.	Title	Writer(s)	Length
1.	"You'll Never Walk Alone"	Rodgers; Hammerstein	NA
2.	"Count Your Blessings Instead of Sheep"	Berlin	NA
3.	"Just a Closer Walk with Thee"	Traditional	NA
4.	"I Believe"	Drake; Graham; Shirl; Stillman	NA
5.	"Battle Hymn of the Republic"	Howe; Steffe	NA
6.	"How Great Thou Art"	Stuart K. Hine	NA
7.	"He's Got the Whole World in His Hands"	Traditional	NA
8.	"It Is No Secret (What God Can Do)"	Hamblen	NA
9.	"Crying in the Chapel"	Glenn	NA
10.	"He"	Mullan; Richards	NA
11.	"May the Good Lord Bless and Keep You"	Willson	NA

Bonus track
No.	Title	Writer(s)	Length
1.	"Precious Memories"	J.B.F. Wright	NA

=== Digital version ===
Inspiration (music download and streaming)
No.	Title	Writer(s)	Length
1.	"You'll Never Walk Alone"	Rodgers; Hammerstein	2:46
2.	"Count Your Blessings Instead of Sheep"	Berlin	2:39
3.	"Just a Closer Walk with Thee"	Traditional	3:18
4.	"I Believe"	Drake; Graham; Shirl; Stillman	2:16
5.	"Battle Hymn of the Republic"	Howe; Steffe	2:54
6.	"How Great Thou Art"	Stuart K. Hine	3:38
7.	"He's Got the Whole World in His Hands"	Traditional	2:39
8.	"It Is No Secret (What God Can Do)"	Hamblen	2:31
9.	"Crying in the Chapel"	Glenn	2:26
10.	"He"	Mullan; Richards	3:09
11.	"May the Good Lord Bless and Keep You"	Willson	3:00

== Personnel ==
All credits are adapted from the original liner notes of Inspiration.

Technical personnel

- Bill Grimes – Photography
- New World Photography – Photography
- Don Richardson, Sr. – Liner notes
- Billy Sherrill – Producer

== Chart performance ==
Chart (1969)	Peak position
US Billboard 200	189
US Top Country Albums (Billboard)	19

== Release history ==
Region	Date	Format	Label	Ref.
Australia	March 1969	Vinyl	CBS Records International; Sony Music	
North America	March 1969	Vinyl	Epic Records	
North America	1998	Cassette; compact disc	Ranwood Records; Sony Music	
North America	2019	Music download; streaming	Epic Records; Sony Legacy	
