= Stand by Your Man (Tammy Wynette album) =

Studio album by Tammy Wynette
- Released: January 1969
- Recorded: March – August 1968
- Studio: Columbia Studio B (Nashville, Tennessee)
- Genre: Country; Nashville Sound
- Label: Epic
- Producer: Billy Sherrill

Tammy Wynette chronology
D-I-V-O-R-C-E (1968)	Stand by Your Man (1969)	Inspiration (1969)

Singles from Stand by Your Man
- 1. "Stand by Your Man" Released: September 1968

Stand by Your Man is a studio album by American country artist Tammy Wynette. It was released in January 1969 via Epic Records and contained 11 tracks. It was the fifth studio album of Wynette's career and was named for its title track. The title track became Wynette's signature song and most successful single of her career.

The album itself consisted of mostly original recordings, which was considered unusual for albums released in the 1960s. However, several cover tunes were also part of the disc. Stand by Your Man has been re-released several times and in several formats. A re-released compact disc version featured two bonus tracks. In its original release, the album reached charting positions in the United States and the United Kingdom. It later received a positive response from two major publications.

== Background ==
Tammy Wynette's career as a country music artist was at its peak by 1969. She had four singles reach the top of the North American country charts between 1967 and 1969: "My Elusive Dreams", "I Don't Wanna Play House", "Take Me to Your World" and "D-I-V-O-R-C-E". In 1968, Wynette and producer Billy Sherrill were recording several selections for what would become her fifth studio record. While giving the studio session musicians a 20-minute break, Sherrill and Wynette composed the song "Stand by Your Man". The song's later success would ultimately name the album it was released on in 1969.

== Recording and content ==
The recording sessions for Stand by Your Man took place between March and August 1968. All sessions were held at Columbia Studio B in Nashville, Tennessee. Billy Sherrill served as producer on all of the sessions. Immediately following its composition, the title track was recorded the same day. Wynette did not like the finished product of the song and feared it would interfere with record sales. At the time, she had been known for songs that had story lines about children. However, she would later succumb to Sherrill who insisted the song be issued as a single.

Ten additional tracks comprised the album itself. Among them was Wynette's self-composed "I Stayed Long Enough". Country artist Billie Jo Spears would release a version of the song in 1970 and it reached the top 40 of the American country chart. Another track, "Forever Yours", would be released as a single by Dottie West in 1970. Her version reached the top 30 of the American country chart. One cover song is also included on the album: "It's My Way". The song was originally written and recorded by Webb Pierce, whose version appeared on the American country chart in 1957. Wynette's cover was first released on her 1968 album, Take Me to Your World / I Don't Wanna Play House. Additional album tracks were new recordings such as "It Keeps Slipping My Mind", "I've Learned", "Joey" and "Don't Make Me Go to School". A 1998 re-released version of the album included two bonus tracks: "There's Quite a Difference" and "I'm Only a Woman".

== Critical reception ==
Professional ratings
Review scores
Source	Rating
Allmusic	5/5 stars

The album received critical acclaim in the years that followed its original release. Greg Adams of AllMusic gave the re-released CD version a five-star rating. Adams found the album unlike that of other 1960s albums because it featured mostly original material. However, he also noted that the album often is forgotten about when compared to its title track: "Although the result is a consistent album by '60s standards, the commercial importance of Stand by Your Man is more significantly tied to the strength of the title track than to its overall quality." In 2020, Rolling Stone named it among the "50 Country Albums Every Rock Fan Should Own". The magazine ranked the album at number 23 on its list. "Wynette's 1969 LP, Stand by Your Man, is a veritable lesson on how to emote without being exact: with every somber break, breathy vowel or choked yodel, she created a lexicon of ways to speak with the mere sound of syllables, let alone words," wrote Marissa Moss.

== Release, chart performance and singles ==
Stand by Your Man was preceded by its title track, which was issued as a single by Epic Records in September 1968. Three months later, the song reached number one on the American Billboard Hot Country Songs chart. On the Billboard Hot 100, it became her highest-climbing single reaching number 19 on the chart. It also topped the charts in the United Kingdom and The Netherlands. It ultimately became Wynette's highest-selling single and signature song. The album was originally released in January 1969 by Epic Records. The label originally issued it both as a vinyl LP and a cassette, containing five songs on "side A" and six songs on "side B". The album has since been reissued and re-released several times. A compact disc version appeared in 1998 by Epic Records in conjunction with Legacy Recordings. It was also reissued digitally through platforms such as Apple Music. In April 1969, Stand by Your Man peaked at number two on the Billboard Country LP's chart and reached number 43 on the Billboard 200 around the same time. It was Wynette's highest-peaking album on the Billboard 200 in her career. In the United Kingdom, the disc reached number 13 on their all-genre albums chart in 1975.

== Track listings ==
Side one
No.	Title	Writer(s)	Reissue length	Length
1.	"Stand by Your Man"	Billy Sherrill; Tammy Wynette	2:41	2:38
2.	"It's My Way"	Webb Pierce; Wayne Walker	2:19	2:18
3.	"Forever Yours"	Jimmy Peppers	2:23	2:21
4.	"I Stayed Long Enough"	Wynette	2:01	1:58
5.	"It Keeps Slipping My Mind"	Harry Mills	2:37	2:39

Side two
No.	Title	Writer(s)	Reissue length	Length
1.	"My Arms Stay Open Late"	Dan Lomax; Curly Putman	2:10	2:08
2.	"I've Learned"	Jot Nelson; Nat Russell	2:45	2:46
3.	"Cry, Cry Again"	Liz Anderson; Dick Land	2:42	2:45
4.	"Joey"	Don Chapel	2:27	2:26
5.	"If I Were a Little Girl"	Mills	2:39	2:42
6.	"Don't Make Me Go to School"	Gene Crysler	3:00	3:04

1999 CD reissue bonus tracks
No.	Title	Writer(s)	Length
12.	"I'm Only a Woman"	Ben Peters	2:54
13.	"There's Quite a Difference"	NA	2:24

== Personnel ==
All credits are adapted from the original liner notes of Stand by Your Man and the re-issued version of the album in 1998.

Technical personnel

- Customatrix – Engineering (1969 version)
- Barry Feldman – Producer (1999 version)
- Howard Fritzson – Art direction (1999 version)
- Grine/New World – Photography (1969 version)
- John Jackson – Product manager (1999 version)
- Randall Martin – Design (1999 version)
- Thomas Molesky – Reissue design (1999 version)
- Dave Nives – Reissue inspiration (1999 version)
- Joseph M. Palmaccio – Mixing (1999 version)
- Al Quaglieri – Reissue producer (1999 version)
- Nick Shaffran – Series consultant (1999 version)
- Billy Sherrill – Producer (1969 version)

== Chart performance ==
Chart (1969 – 1975)	Peak position
UK Albums (OCC)	13
US Billboard 200	43
US Top Country Albums (Billboard)	2

== Certifications ==
Certifications for Stand by Your Man
Region	Certification	Certified units/sales
United Kingdom (BPI)	Silver	60,000^{^}
^{^} Shipments figures based on certification alone.

== Release history ==
Region	Date	Format	Label	Ref.
Australia	January 1969	Vinyl	Epic Records	
Japan	January 1969	Vinyl	CBS Records International; Sony Music	
North America	January 1969	Vinyl; cassette	Epic Records	
North America	October 19, 1999	Compact disc	Epic Records; Legacy Recordings	
North America	2010s	Music download; streaming	Sony Music	
