= Whenever He Holds You =

Single by Bobby Goldsboro

from the album The Bobby Goldsboro Album
- B-side: "If She Was Mine"
- Released: 1964
- Genre: Traditional pop
- Length: 2:14
- Label: United Artists Records
- Songwriter: Bobby Goldsboro
- Producer: Jack Gold

Bobby Goldsboro singles chronology
"See the Funny Little Clown" (1963)	"Whenever He Holds You" (1964)	"Me Japanese Boy I Love You" (1964)

"Whenever He Holds You" is a song written and sung by Bobby Goldsboro, which he released in 1964. The song spent eight weeks on the Billboard Hot 100 chart, peaking at No. 39, while reaching No. 13 on Billboard's Pop-Standard Singles chart, No. 41 on the Cash Box Top 100, and No. 28 on Canada's CHUM Hit Parade.

== Chart performance ==
Chart (1964)	Peak position
US Billboard Hot 100	39
US Billboard Pop-Standard Singles	13
US Cash Box Top 100	41
Canada - CHUM Hit Parade	28
