= The Voice of Billie Jo Spears =

Studio album by Billie Jo Spears
- Released: November 1968
- Recorded: May – August 1968
- Studio: Columbia (Nashville, Tennessee)
- Genre: Country
- Label: Capitol
- Producer: Kelso Herston

Billie Jo Spears chronology
The Voice of Billie Jo Spears (1968)	Mr. Walker, It's All Over! (1969)

Singles from The Voice of Billie Jo Spears
- 1. "Harper Valley PTA" Released: August 1968; 2. "He's Got More Love on His Little Finger" Released: November 1968

The Voice of Billie Jo Spears is a studio album by American country artist Billie Jo Spears. It was released in November 1968 via Capitol Records and contained 11 tracks. The disc mixed both new recordings with original material and featured her first charting single: "He's Got More Love on His Little Finger". It was the debut studio album of Spears's career and received positive reviews from critics.

== Background, recording and content ==
Billie Jo Spears first signed a recording contract with United Artists Records in 1964. However, she had limited success with her first several recordings. Her label producer (Kelso Herston) moved to Capitol Records and was able to bring Spears to the label with him in 1968. The first recordings Herston made with Spears would be The Voice of Billie Jo Spears. The project was recorded in sessions held between May and August 1968 at the Columbia Studios.

The album consisted of 11 tracks. Many of the album's tracks were cover tunes. This included Bobbie Gentry's "Ode to Billie Joe" and two of Tammy Wynette's singles: "I Don't Wanna Play House" and "Take Me to Your World". New tracks are also featured such as "Home Loving Man", "Till Something Better Comes Along", "Talk Talk" and "He's Got More Love on His Little Finger". Three of these songs were composed (or co-composed) by Jack Rhodes, whom helped jump start Spears's early career.

== Release, critical reception and singles ==
The Voice of Billie Jo Spears was released by Capitol Records in November 1968. It was distributed as a vinyl LP, featuring six songs on "side A" and five songs on "side B". It was the debut studio album of Spears's recording career. The album was received positively by critics and music publications. Billboard magazine called it a "powerful LP", highlighting the track "Get Behind Me Satan and Push". Alan Cackett of Country Music People magazine found that the disc "showed off her emotional styling on a selection of well known songs". AllMusic later rated the album 4.5 out of 5 possible stars.

The first single from the album was the song "Harper Valley PTA", issued in August 1968. A competing version by Jeannie C. Riley released at the same time became the commercially successful version. The second single issued was "He's Got More Love on His Little Finger" in November 1968. It was Spears's first single to make the American Billboard Hot Country Songs chart. Spending ten weeks on the chart, it climbed to the number 48 position in January 1969.

== Track listing ==
Side one
No.	Title	Writer(s)	Length
1.	"Home-Loving Man"	Jack Rhodes	2:17
2.	"Take Me to Your World"	Billy Sherrill; Glenn Sutton	2:58
3.	"Harper Valley PTA"	Tom T. Hall	3:12
4.	"Till Something Better Comes Along"	Jerry Chestnut	2:56
5.	"Talk Talk"	Rhodes	2:37
6.	"Mollie Brown"	Rhodes; Billie Jo Spears	2:05

Side two
No.	Title	Writer(s)	Length
1.	"A Woman of the World"	Jerry Foster; Merv Shiner	2:07
2.	"I Don't Wanna Play House"	Sherrill; Sutton	2:45
3.	"He's Got More Love in His Little Finger"	Carl Friend; Lance Roberts; Mac Vickery	2:50
4.	"Get Behind Me Satan and Push"	Ann Kiker; Doris Hamilton	2:16
5.	"Ode to Billie Joe"	Bobbie Gentry	4:30

== Release history ==
Region	Date	Format	Label	Ref.
North America	November 1968	Vinyl LP	Capitol Records	
United Kingdom	March 1970	Vinyl LP	Capitol Records	
Australia	June 1971	Vinyl LP	World Record Club	
