= Stay Away from the Apple Tree =

Single by Billie Jo Spears

from the album Billie Jo
- B-side: "Before Your Time"
- Released: May 1975
- Recorded: April 1975
- Studio: Jack Clement Recording (Nashville, Tennessee)
- Genre: Country; Countrypolitan
- Length: 2:46
- Label: United Artists
- Songwriters: Roger Bowling; Larry Butler
- Producer: Larry Butler

Billie Jo Spears singles chronology
"Blanket on the Ground" (1975)	"Stay Away from the Apple Tree" (1975)	"Silver Wings and Golden Rings" (1975)

"Stay Away from the Apple Tree" is a song recorded by American country artist Billie Jo Spears. It was written by Roger Bowling and Larry Butler. Released as a single, the track reached the top 20 of the North American country charts in 1975. It was also released on Spears's 1975 album titled Billie Jo.

== Background and recording ==
After years of personal and professional setbacks, Billie Jo Spears returned in 1975 with the single "Blanket on the Ground". The song topped the country charts and set forth a string of top ten and top 20 singles during the seventies decade. Her immediate follow-up single to "Blanket on the Ground" was 1975's "Stay Away from the Apple Tree". The track was composed by Roger Bowling and Larry Butler. Butler would also serve as the song's producer when it was recorded in April 1975. The session was held at the Jack Clement Recording Studio, located in Nashville, Tennessee.

== Release and chart performance ==
"Stay Away from the Apple Tree" was released by United Artists Records in May 1975. It was backed on the B-side by the song, "Before Your Time". It was distributed as a seven-inch vinyl single. The song entered America's Billboard Hot Country Songs chart in July 1975. It reached a peak of 20 on the chart in October 1975. It was one of 12 singles that reached either the top ten or top 20 of the Billboard country chart in the wake of "Blanket on the Ground". On Canada's RPM Country Tracks survey, the single reached number 17. "Stay Away from the Apple Tree" was included on Spears's second studio album on United Artists, titled Billie Jo.

== Track listing ==
7" vinyl single

- "Stay Away from the Apple Tree" – 2:46
- "Before Your Time" – 2:47

== Charts ==
Weekly chart performance for "Stay Away from the Apple Tree"
Chart (1975)	Peak position
Canada Country Tracks (RPM)	17
US Hot Country Songs (Billboard)	20
