= Billie Jo Spears =

American country music singer (1938–2011)

- Spears c. 1970s
- Born: Billie Jean Moore; January 14, 1938; Beaumont, Texas, U.S.
- Died: December 14, 2011 (aged 73)
- Occupations: Singer; record producer
- Years active: 1953–2011
- Spouses: 5, including: Terry Bethel (divorced); Doug Walton (divorced); Mike Edlin (divorced)
- Children: 3
- Musical career
- Genres: Country; country disco; honky tonk
- Instrument: Vocals
- Labels: Abbott; Capitol; United Artists/Liberty; Ritz; Premier; Dot/MCA; Broadland; Carlton; K-tel

Billie Jo Spears (born Billie Jean Moore; January 14, 1938 – December 14, 2011) was an American country music singer. She was known for a series of singles whose characters often represented women in assertive positions. Among these recordings was a song about sexual harassment ("Mr. Walker, It's All Over"), and a song about rekindling sexual desire ("Blanket on the Ground").

Spears was raised in a working-class Texas family. She made her first recording at age 13 on the Abbott label. Singer–songwriter Jack Rhodes discovered her early music and helped her secure a professional partnership with producer Kelso Herston. Under Herston's production, she had her first top-ten song with 1969's "Mr. Walker, It's All Over" (issued on Capitol Records). Several follow-up releases were not as successful, and after recovering from a vocal setback she returned to United Artists. Her second release was 1975's "Blanket on the Ground", which topped the American country chart and became a commercial pop success in several countries.

Spears followed with several more American top ten and top 20 country songs like "What I've Got in Mind", "Misty Blue", "If You Want Me", "'57 Chevrolet" and a cover of "I Will Survive". Spears continued to have success overseas, particularly in the United Kingdom where she had several more top 40 songs. In 1981, Spears left United Artists (now Liberty) and recorded several albums with British labels during the 1980s and 1990s. She also continued to tour throughout, most notably in the United Kingdom. Meanwhile, Spears married and divorced five times between the 1960s and 1990s. In 2011, Spears died of cancer aged 73.

== Early life ==
Billie Jean Moore was born in Beaumont, Texas and was one of six children. Her father was a truck driver, while her mother worked as a shipyard welder and waitress. Moore was usually called "BJ" during her childhood and the nickname stuck throughout her adult life. She was routinely exposed to country music throughout her childhood. Her mother spent some of her free time performing as a guitarist in a western swing band called the Light Crust Doughboys.

Moore's sister Betty first had aspirations of becoming a country artist and even signed a recording contract, but she chose a domestic life over a professional career. Moore began singing professionally at age 13. She was discovered by songwriter Jack Rhodes, who helped her land an appearance on the Louisiana Hayride television program. This brought Moore to the attention of the Abbott label. In 1953, the company released her first single while she was still a teenager titled "Too Old for Toys, Too Young for Boys". The track was issued under the name "Billie Jo Moore". According to the Encyclopedia of Music in the 20th Century, the record brought in an estimated $4,200. However, a separate statement from The Independent claimed that the record only brought Moore $2000.

Moore graduated from Beaumont's French High School in 1955. Upon graduating, she worked a series of jobs outside the music industry. This included working as a carhop for four years at Neva's, a restaurant near her hometown. She also held a position as a clerical worker for the Beaumont Bag and Burlap Company. Meanwhile, Jack Rhodes persuaded Moore to pursue a career as a country music artist. In 1964, she moved to Nashville, Tennessee. During this period, she changed her professional name to "Billie Jo Spears".

== Career ==
=== 1964–1973: Initial success ===
Spears tried to find a recording contract after moving to Nashville. She first made several demonstration records with producer Pete Drake. In 1964, she secured a recording deal with United Artists Records. She cut several singles that were issued by United Artists but failed to become successful. Her producer at the time was Kelso Herston, who would move to Capitol Records. Believing in her musical abilities, he helped her switch to Capitol in 1968. Spears's first single for the label was the song "Harper Valley PTA". Released at the same time was a competing version by Jeannie C. Riley which became the commercially successful version. Spears's next single, "He's Got More Love on His Little Finger", became her first to make the American Billboard country chart. It was followed later in the year by her debut studio album titled The Voice of Billie Jo Spears.

Spears' next single release was 1969's "Mr. Walker, It's All Over". Its musical style and lyrical themes were said to resemble that of "Harper Valley PTA". The song told the story of a New York City secretary who confronts her boss after facing sexual harassment in the work place. The song became Spears's commercial breakout, reaching the top five of the Billboard Hot Country Songs chart, the top 80 of the Billboard Hot 100 and the top ten of the Canadian RPM Country Tracks survey. Capitol then issued Spears's second studio album of the same name, which reached the Billboard Top Country Albums top 30. The disc featured several new recordings that followed similar storylines to her top ten single and included a cover of Tammy Wynette's "Stand by Your Man".

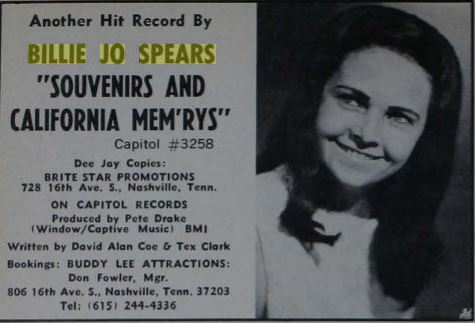
Billie Jo Spears in a magazine advertisement for her 1972 single, "Souvenirs and California Memories".

Capitol released several follow-up singles by Spears that discussed social issues. Among them was 1969's "Stepchild", which told the story of a boy who murders his abusive stepfather. It only reached number 43 on the Billboard country chart. Another follow-up single was 1970's "Marty Gray", a song that told the story of a teenage girl who becomes unexpectedly pregnant following a sexual encounter with a high school football player. It reached number 17 on the Billboard country chart. Her third Capitol studio album, Miss Sincerity, was her second to make the Country Albums chart.

With her new success, Spears toured in the United Kingdom for the first time as part of the "Capitol Country Caravan". She would later find her greatest success overseas. Critics and writers also took notice of Spears's music for the first time. Alan Cackett of Country Music People called her "a fine singer" with "emotional styling". In reviewing her second album, AllMusic's Richie Unterberger praised Spears's assertive vocal style and song choices: "It's a quite strong set of material, hewing to the gutsier side of late-'60s country-pop, with Spears proving herself as one of the tougher, harder-edged, commercial country singers of the era."

In 1970, Spears began working alongside Capitol producer George Richey. He attempted to move her music in an orchestrated pop direction. Studio albums like With Love, Billie Jo Spears (1970) and Country Girl (1971) featured remakes of Johnny Bond's "Your Old Love Letters" and Cole Porter's "True Love". Through 1971, the singles "I Stayed Long Enough" and "It Could 'A Been Me" made the Billboard country top 40. When her next releases failed to prove successful, Capitol Records dropped Spears from their roster. Following her departure, Spears was forced to have vocal chord surgery which set her career back as well. After recovering, she returned on the independent Brite Star and Cutlass labels. However, the label made poor business choices. "Everyone involved with them should be behind bars, and some of them are," she later commented.

=== 1974–1981: Comeback, international success and peak years ===
In 1974, Spears returned to United Artists Records. She was signed by producer Larry Butler, who was growing his country roster at the label. Her first United Artists release was a remake of Bobby Goldsboro's "See the Funny Little Clown". It failed to become successful and Spears began looking for her next hit. Butler brought Spears to the attention of a new song penned by Roger Bowling called "Blanket on the Ground". It had been previously rejected by several producers who thought the song's sexual themes were too controversial. "It sounded like a cheating song, and the public don't think girls should sing cheating songs!" she commented. "Blanket on the Ground" reached number one on the Billboard country chart, number 78 on the Hot 100 and number two on the RPM country chart. It also became an international crossover success, reaching number six in the United Kingdom number 11 in Ireland among other countries.

Spears's first United Artists album of the same name reached the top five of the Billboard country chart in 1975. It became a best-selling album in the United Kingdom, receiving a "Silver" certification from the British Phonographic Industry. The comeback brought Spears the Top New Female Vocalist accolade from the Academy of Country Music Awards during this time. "It sure is good to be back. I'm a different person now when I'm recording, because I'm also able to present a much better show on my personal appearances," she commented. To conclude 1975, Spears had two top 20 North American country singles with "Stay Away from the Apple Tree" and "Silver Wings and Golden Rings".

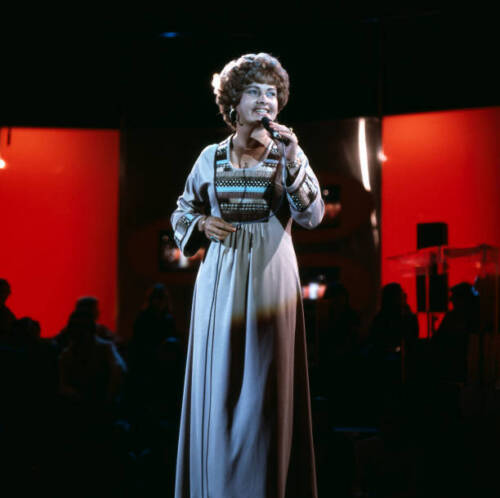
Billie Jo Spears performing on a music show in 1976.

Spears's collaboration with producer Larry Butler continued through the seventies. Butler crafted an up-tempo, country pop sound that was considered both marketable and dance-able. Many of her most popular singles reflected themes of sexual desire or rekindling loves fading fires. Her next single was 1976's "What I've Got in Mind", which also hinted at sexual themes. The single reached the top five of the North American country charts and the top five of the UK pop chart. Her studio LP of the same name also reached the Top Country Albums top five and certified silver from the BPI. The album also spawned a cover of the ballad, "Misty Blue", which reached the American country top five. "Sing Me an Old Fashioned Song" was released to European countries, peaking within United Kingdom top 40 and the top ten in Ireland. Her British success later led to multiple appearances at the Wembley Arena, where she became a favorite with crowds for many years. During this period, she also collaborated with Del Reeves on the album By Request. The disc featured duet recordings by the pair and was released on United Artists in 1976.

Spears had a string of top ten and top 20 country singles during the later half of the seventies. The 1977 releases, "Never Did Like Whiskey" and "I'm Not Easy", both made the top 20 of the American country charts. They were included on her 1977 top 40 country LP, I'm Not Easy. I'm Not Easy also featured a cover of Elvis Presley's "Heartbreak Hotel", which was intended to be a single. According to the Independent, Spears cancelled the single following the death of Presley because she did not want to "exploit" his passing. Instead, the up-tempo "If You Want Me" reached the Hot Country Songs top ten in 1977. Through 1978, four of Spears's singles reached the top 20 consecutively: "Too Much Is Not Enough", "Lonely Hearts Club", "I've Got to Go" and "'57 Chevrolet".

In 1979, United Artists released Spears's cover of Gloria Gaynor's disco hit "I Will Survive". It was a popular recording in the United Kingdom, where it charted on their pop survey. It also reached number 21 on the American country chart and number nine on the Canadian country chart. "I Will Survive" served as the name for her 1979 LP, which spawned two additional charting singles. Greg Adams of AllMusic gave the disc a four-star rating and called it "a typically fine effort". In 1980, a song about walking away from a failed relationship ("Standing Tall") returned Spears to the top 20 of the American country chart and the top ten of the Canadian country chart. Her 1981 cover of Tammy Wynette's "Your Good Girl's Gonna Go Bad" was her final top 20 country single. Spears then departed from United Artists (now Liberty) records.

=== 1982–2011: Focus in the United Kingdom and final career years ===
In 1982, Spears signed with the United Kingdom-based label Ritz Records. The label received airplay on BBC Radio 2 and Spears was promised to receive airtime there. Her first label single was 1982's "Apologizing Roses". It was included on the Ritz studio album, BJ – Billie Jo Spears Today (1983). Along with new material, the disc also featured covers of "Seven Lonely Days" and John Anderson's "Swingin'". Spears also collaborated on a duet with Carey Duncan called "I Can Hear Kentucky Calling Me". In 1984, the Premier label (also based in the United Kingdom) released her next studio album titled We Just Came Apart at the Dreams. It featured new recordings, along with covers of Rosanne Cash's "Ain't No Money" and Don Gibson's "Sweet Dreams". Its title track was issued as a single in 1983. Spears's final chart appearance in the United States was "Midnight Blue", which reached the Billboard country songs top 40 in 1984. A 1986 joint venture between MCA/Dot resulted in an eponymous studio project.

In 1991, Broadland International released Spears's next studio project titled Unmistakably. The disc contained ten songs, most of which were new recordings. Its only single was the track "One Smokey Rose", which originally reached the top ten on the Canadian country chart for Anita Perras. Spears also recorded several cuts at Broadland for an intended duets project, which never came to be. "The album never got finished and I don't know what happened to the money. It's pathetic and I'm very disappointed." she told journalist Spencer Leigh. In 1996, Spears returned with the studio album Outlaw Woman. The disc was co-produced by Spears and was released in the United Kingdom by Carlton Records. Spears also recorded many of her most-popular songs for several low budget albums. Among them was a 1998 studio project distributed by K-tel.

In the final years of her career, Spears continued to perform on a regular basis. Because of her notable following in the United Kingdom, Spears did most of her concert engagements there. She would complete over 400 concerts and engagements in the United Kingdom during her lifetime. Spears hoped to record a live album at the Pavilion Theatre in Scotland, but never got around to doing so. Shortly before she died, Spears performed regularly with Irish country artist, Philomena Begley. This included a tour in both 2010 and 2011.

== Artistry ==
Spears's musical style was rooted in the country genre. Specifically, her early Capitol recordings embedded aspects of traditional country. Writers Mary A. Bufwack and Robert K. Oermann found that her sixties-era recordings had a "diminutive honky-tonker" style while Richie Unterberger of AllMusic found the same selections to have "harder edge" compared to other female artists. Many writers found that Spears's United Artists/Liberty recordings shifted towards country pop and country disco. Author Kurt Wolff disagreed in his book Country Music: The Rough Guide: "Though Billie Jo Spears had her biggest hits during the 1970s, she was far more earthy and grounded than most singers passing for 'country' during the decade."

Bufwack and Oermann found that her late seventies music was "some of the most distinctive pop-country fusion discs of the day." Stephen L. Betts of Rolling Stone found that Spears also had elements of country disco, highlighting 1979's "I Will Survive" in the article Country Disco: 15 Great, Wild and WTF Songs. "With the familiar piano opening by Hargus "Pig" Robbins and backing vocals from the Jordanaires, the Grammy-nominated country-meets-western-meets-Studio 54 concoction remains deliciously odd and totally irresistible," he concluded.

Writers and critics also highlighted the blues-influenced style of Spears's vocal delivery. AllMusic's Steve Huey called her "a perfect torch balladeer" with a "sultry, bluesy voice". In an AllMusic review of a compilation album, Stephen Cook called Spears's vocals "smoky and sensual". Music writers also noticed Spears's characteristic twang in her vocal performances. Bufwack and Oermann commented that she had a "Texas accent as thick as salsa and twice as tangy." Kurt Wolff commented, "Her voice was strong and confident sort of a combination of Loretta Lynn twang and the swampy soul of Bobbie Gentry." Stephen L. Betts described her as a "twangy Texan".

== Legacy ==
Writers and journalists have remembered Spears for songs that showed women in strong and assertive positions. Following her death, Bill Friskics-Warren of The New York Times wrote, "Ms. Spears rose to prominence in the late 1960s with a string of up-tempo, socially conscious songs portraying plucky survivors." Mary A. Bufwack and Robert K. Oermann explained in their 2003 book that Spears's choice of material set her apart: "Billie Jo was unusual for a country female of the period in that she recorded hardly any 'victim' material. Almost all of the star's hit ballads are of women leaving, surviving or otherwise asserting themselves."

Spears's music has been recorded by other artists and has been considered influential to other artists. Tammy Wynette was influenced by Spears's sixties-era United Artists recordings. According to producer Kelso Herston, Wynette studied her singing style by listening to Spears's records in his Nashville office. "I still think that she was influenced some by Billie Jo. She really did like her," he told biographer Jimmy McDonough. Lorrie Morgan knew many of Spear's recordings about assertive women and cut Spears's "Standing Tall" for her 1995 compilation Reflections: Greatest Hits. Morgan also performed many of Spears's popular songs in her concerts, including "Silver Wings and Golden Rings".

== Personal life and death ==
Spears was married a total of five times. Dates of Spears's marriages and divorces have not been published. However, several of her spouses names have appeared in books. The Insider's Country Music Handbook reported that Spears was briefly married and divorced from both Terry Bethel and Doug Walton. Both were country music musicians. The book Grassroots Music in the Upper Cumberland reported a brief marriage to Mike Edlin, another fellow musician. Finding Her Voice: This History of Women in Country Music explained that Spears married her third husband in 1975, who was fifteen years younger than she. His name was not given. Spears spoke of the age difference in the book, "I guess I just think young. If it was the other way around, no one would give it a second thought...You're only as young as you feel." From her various marriages, Spears had three children: Tim Pierce, Kevin Jones and Ronnie Jones.

In the early 1970s, it was discovered that Spears had nodules on her vocal cords. She underwent two surgeries and had to spend six months in silence so her voice could recover. "I was singing too high and straining on the high notes. It took six months of total silence to recover. I lowered all my keys and I don't scream anymore," she said. In 1980, Spears was injured in a car accident in Nashville, Tennessee. Billboard reported that she suffered a concussion, a fractured arm and multiple cuts. She was hospitalized for one day and had to cancel several concert engagements. However, she made a full recovery. In 1993, she underwent triple bypass heart surgery and made a full recovery.

A heavy smoker, Spears suffered from lung cancer in her final years. In her autobiography, singer and friend Philomena Begley spoke of how Spears became increasingly weaker and frail shortly before her death. Begley also said that Spears continued to smoke despite her diagnosis. Spears chose to spend her final days in hospice care at her home in Vidor, Texas. On December 14, 2011, she died at her Vidor home at the age of 73.

== Discography ==
Studio albums

- The Voice of Billie Jo Spears (1968)
- Mr. Walker, It's All Over! (1969)
- Miss Sincerity (1969)
- With Love, Billie Jo Spears (1970)
- Country Girl (1970)
- Just Singin' (1971)
- Blanket on the Ground (1975)
- Billie Jo (1975)
- What I've Got in Mind (1976)
- By Request (1976) (with Del Reeves)
- I'm Not Easy (1976)
- If You Want Me (1977)
- Lonely Hearts Club (1978)
- Love Ain't Gonna Wait for Us
- I Will Survive (1979)
- Standing Tall (1980)
- Only the Hits (1981)
- Country Girl (1981)
- BJ – Billie Jo Spears Today (1983)
- We Just Came Apart at the Dreams (1984)
- Billie Jo Spears (1986)
- Unmistakably (1991)
- Outlaw Woman (1996)
- The Best of Billie Jo Spears: New Recordings of Her Greatest Hits...and More... (1998)

== Awards and nominations ==
Year	Nominee / work	Award	Result	Ref.
1969	Cashbox	Most Promising C&W Instrumentalist	Won	
1969	Record World	Most Promising Female Vocalist	Won	
1970	Billboard	Top Female Vocalist – Singles	Nominated	
1971	Record World	Top Female Vocalist	Nominated	
1975	Billboard	Top Female Vocalist – Singles and Albums	Nominated	
1976	Academy of Country Music Awards	Most Promising Female Vocalist	Won	
1976	Cash Box	Top Female Vocalist	Nominated	
1977	Record World	Top Female Vocalist	Nominated	
1979	Record World	Top Female Vocalist	Nominated	
1980	Grammy Awards	Best Female Country Vocal Performance – "I Will Survive"	Nominated	
1980	Record World	Top Female Vocalist	Nominated	
1981	Record World	Top Female Vocalist	Nominated	
2010	Vidor Walk of Fame	Inducted	Won	
