= See the Funny Little Clown =

Single by Bobby Goldsboro

from the album The Bobby Goldsboro Album
- B-side: "Hello Loser"
- Released: November 18, 1963
- Recorded: October 17, 1963
- Studio: Bell Sound (New York City)
- Genre: Traditional pop
- Length: 2:35
- Label: United Artists Records
- Songwriter: Bobby Goldsboro
- Producer: Jack Gold

Bobby Goldsboro singles chronology
"That's What Love Will Do" (1963)	"See the Funny Little Clown" (1963)	"Whenever He Holds You" (1964)

"See the Funny Little Clown" is a song written and sung by Bobby Goldsboro, which he recorded on October 17, 1963 and released on November 18, 1963. In 1964, the song spent 13 weeks on the Billboard Hot 100 chart, peaking at No. 9, while reaching No. 3 on Billboard's Middle-Road Singles chart, No. 10 on the Cash Box Top 100, and No. 30 on Canada's CHUM Hit Parade.

The song was ranked No. 90 on the Cash Box "Top 100 Chart Hits of 1964."

== Background ==
This song deals about himself, who is hopelessly in love with a woman, even when he tried to be funny with himself, in order to attract the woman's attention. It is in the last line, that the narrator states that it is he, who is that sad and funny little clown.

== Chart performance ==
Chart (1964)	Peak position
US Billboard Hot 100	9
US Billboard Middle-Road Singles	3
US Cash Box Top 100	10
Canada - CHUM Hit Parade	30

== Cover versions ==
- Billie Jo Spears released a cover of "See the Funny Little Clown" in 1974, with her version reaching No. 80 on Billboard's Hot Country chart.
