= Stand by Your Man =

1968 Tammy Wynette song

- Norwegian picture sleeve

Single by Tammy Wynette

from the album Stand by Your Man
- B-side: "I Stayed Long Enough"
- Released: September 20, 1968
- Recorded: August 26, 1968
- Studio: Columbia Studio B (Nashville, Tennessee)
- Genre: Country
- Length: 2:38
- Label: Epic 10398
- Songwriters: Billy Sherrill, Tammy Wynette
- Producer: Billy Sherrill

Tammy Wynette singles chronology
"D-I-V-O-R-C-E" (1968)	"Stand by Your Man" (1968)	"Singing My Song" (1969)

Licensed audio
- "Stand by Your Man" on YouTube

"Stand by Your Man" is a song recorded by the American country music artist Tammy Wynette, co-written by Wynette and Billy Sherrill. It was released on September 20, 1968, as the first single and title track from the album Stand by Your Man. It proved to be the most successful record of Wynette's career, and is one of the most familiar songs in country music. The song was placed at number one on CMT's list of the Top 100 Country Music Songs.

Released as a 7-inch 45 rpm single, it was reported added to some jukeboxes and receiving airplay on select American R&B and country radio stations by October 12, and it entered the Billboard charts on October 19. The song stayed number 1 on the U.S. country charts for three weeks. "Stand by Your Man" crossed over to the U.S. pop charts, peaking at number 19. Wynette became a global superstar when the song reached number 1 in the UK Singles Chart in 1975, and also reached number 1 in the Netherlands. An album of the same name—which was also quite successful—was released in 1968. The song earned Wynette the 1970 Grammy Award for Best Country Vocal Performance, Female—her second Grammy win in that category—and was inducted into the Grammy Hall of Fame in 1999.

The song received some criticism during the late 1960s-early 1970s women's liberation movement, as feminist groups interpreted the song as advocating staying with men who were unfaithful or otherwise mistreated their wives. For others, the song made Wynette a spokeswoman for working-class housewives experiencing marital disappointments and changing gender roles in the late 1960s. However, Wynette herself said she had not intended any social or political message, reportedly stating: "It's unbelievable to me that a song that took me 20 minutes to write, I've spent 20 or 30 years defending." The song gained more attention in 1992, when Hillary Clinton stated during an interview on 60 Minutes how "I'm not sitting here, some little woman standing by my man like Tammy Wynette", regarding Bill Clinton's affair with Gennifer Flowers. Wynette was angered by this remark and issued a statement shortly after.

Vocal accompaniment is provided by the Jordanaires, who provided background vocals on most of Wynette's hit recordings.

The song was selected by the Library of Congress as a 2010 addition to the National Recording Registry, which selects recordings annually that are "culturally, historically, or aesthetically significant". In 2021, it was ranked No. 473 on Rolling Stone's "Top 500 Songs of All Time".

== In popular culture ==
The song is heard during the closing credits of Alain Delon's 1969 film La Piscine.

The song opens Jack Nicholson's 1970 drama film Five Easy Pieces.

Answer songs included Conway Twitty's 1971 No. 1 hit "How Much More Can She Stand" and Ronnie Milsap's "(I'm A) Stand by My Woman Man", a 1976 number that also topped the country music charts.

The song is performed by an unenthusiastic Blues Brothers Band in their 1980 film, in the scene in Bob's Country Bunker when they are compelled, against their preferences, to play country music to satisfy rowdy patrons.

The song is playing on the radio of Vinny and Mona Lisa's hotel room in the 1992 film My Cousin Vinny.

The song is played during the closing scene of The Wonder Years 1993 episode "The Little Women". The episode, set in 1973, featured Kevin and his father Jack feeling down during the backdrop of the women's lib movement of the 1970s, with Kevin's girlfriend Winnie scoring higher at her SAT tests than him and his mother Norma getting a full-time job, so they took their partners out bowling and beat them mercilessly at the game, however, they still remained good sports despite losing, as shown during the drive home.

GoldenEye (1995) features a comedic rendition of the song, which is sung by Irina (Minnie Driver).

In the 2018 Korean TV series "Something in the Rain" the song is frequently played throughout the show.

In the 2021 Netflix series ‘’Country Comfort’’, the song features prominently at the end of episode three, "Sign, Sign, Everywhere a Sign".

The song is referenced in Ethel Cain's "Wrestling in Dirt Pits", through the line "Unlike Tammy, I can't stand my man".

In the 2022 film Mr. Harrigan's Phone, Craig's and Mr. Harrigan's phone ringtones are set to the song so that they know when the other is calling.

== Chart performance ==
=== Weekly charts ===
Chart (1968–1969)	Peak position
Australia (Go-Set)	9
Canada Country Singles (RPM)	1
Canada Top Singles (RPM)	15
US Adult Contemporary (Billboard)	11
US Billboard Hot 100	19
US Hot Country Songs (Billboard)	1
Chart (1975)	Peak position
Belgium (Ultratop 50 Flanders)	1
Belgium (Ultratop 50 Wallonia)	9
Ireland (IRMA)	1
Netherlands (Single Top 100)	1
New Zealand (Recorded Music NZ)	31
UK Singles (Official Charts)	1
West Germany (GfK)	36
Chart (1998)	Peak position
US Billboard Hot Country Singles & Tracks	56

=== Year-end charts ===
Chart (1975)	Position
Belgium (Ultratop 50 Flanders)	9
Netherlands (Single Top 100)	7
UK (British Market Research Bureau)	5

== Certifications ==
Region	Certification	Certified units/sales
New Zealand (RMNZ)	Gold	15,000^{‡}
United Kingdom (BPI)	Gold	500,000^{^}
^{^} Shipments figures based on certification alone.^{‡} Sales+streaming figures based on certification alone.

== Heike Makatsch version ==
"Stand by Your Man"

Single by Heike Makatsch
- Released: March 10, 1996
- Recorded: 1996
- Genre: Country, pop
- Length: 3:52
- Label: Metronome Records
- Songwriters: Billy Sherrill, Tammy Wynette
- Producer: Detlef Petersen

Heike Makatsch singles chronology
"Stand by Your Man" (1996)	"This Girl Was Made for Loving" (1997)

In 1996, Heike Makatsch recorded her version of the song, which was used as the soundtrack of the movie Jailbirds. The cover was a great success in the German-speaking countries. In terms of musical genre, the cover remained true to the original, but more pop.

=== Track listings ===
CD-maxi

1. Stand by Your Man - 2:53
2. Cat Calls - Detlef Petersen - 3:37
3. Stand by Your Man (Part II mit dem Gefangenenchor) - 3:37

=== Charts ===
Chart (1996)	Peak position
German Singles Chart	11
Austrian Singles Chart	30
Swiss Singles Chart	29

== Other cover versions ==
- In 1968, Patti Page covered the song and it was released by Columbia Records. It peaked at No. 20 on the Billboard Easy Listening chart and "bubbled" under their Hot 100 chart at No. 21 (121).
- In 1970, Candi Staton covered the song, peaking at No. 4 on the Billboard R&B chart and at No. 24 on the pop Hot 100. She also reached No. 21 on the Cash Box Top 100.
- In 1982, Motörhead and the Plasmatics collaborated to cover this song. Wendy O. Williams and Lemmy Kilmister sung a duet, making the song into a punk rock song.
- In 1993, Lyle Lovett covered the song for the soundtrack to the film The Crying Game. That same year, Lovett performed the song with Wynette on The Tonight Show with Jay Leno.
- In 1994, Lisa Brokop covered the song for the soundtrack to the film Harmony Cats. It was released as a single and peaked at number 88 on the RPM Country Tracks chart.
- Country band The Chicks recorded a version of the song for the country covers album Tribute to Tradition in 1998. Their rendition was later humorously released as the B-side of their 2000 single "Goodbye Earl".
- Country music star Carrie Underwood performed the song at the Grand Ole Opry in May 2008.
- In 2012, Willam Belli and Drake Jensen released a cover as the seventh single from Belli's debut studio album The Wreckoning.
- In 2023, on multiple occasions across her 2023–2024 tour, Lana Del Rey covered the song.
