= Blanket on the Ground =

1975 song

Single by Billie Jo Spears

from the album Blanket on the Ground
- B-side: "Come on Home"
- Released: January 1975
- Recorded: November 4, 1974
- Studio: American Studios, Nashville, Tennessee
- Genre: Country
- Length: 3:23
- Label: United Artists
- Songwriter: Roger Bowling
- Producer: Larry Butler

Billie Jo Spears singles chronology
"See the Funny Little Clown" (1974)	"Blanket on the Ground" (1975)	"Stay Away from the Apple Tree" (1975)

"Blanket on the Ground" is a song written by Roger Bowling and recorded by American country music singer Billie Jo Spears. It was released in February 1975 as the second single and title track from the album Blanket on the Ground. Irish born singer Philomena Begley covered the song as the lead single from her 1975 LP of the same name. Begley's single was released on August 4, 1975, in Ireland and August 6, 1975, in the United Kingdom reaching number 1 and number 4 in Ireland and the UK respectively.

== Content ==
The song is sung from the point of view of a middle-aged woman who coaxes her hesitant husband outdoors to make love in the moonlight.

== Chart performance ==
The song reached #1 on Billboard Magazine's Hot Country Singles chart, and #78 on the Hot 100 pop charts. In the United Kingdom, the song reached #6 on the pop charts.

=== Weekly charts ===
Chart (1975)	Peak position
Australia (Kent Music Report)	20
Austria (Ö3 Austria Top 40)	15
Belgium (Ultratop 50 Flanders)	21
Belgium (Ultratop 50 Wallonia)	50
Canadian RPM Country Tracks	2
Ireland (IRMA)	11
Netherlands (Dutch Top 40)	13
Netherlands (Single Top 100)	15
New Zealand (Recorded Music NZ)	11
South Africa	15
UK Singles (Official Charts)	6
US Billboard Hot 100	78
US Hot Country Songs (Billboard)	1
West Germany (GfK)	39

=== Year-end charts ===
Chart (1975)	Position
New Zealand (Recorded Music NZ)	35
UK Singles (OCC)	38
US Billboard Hot 100	433
US Hot Country Songs (Billboard)	30

== Certifications ==
Certifications and sales for "Blanket on the Ground"
Region	Certification	Certified units/sales
United Kingdom (BPI) Sales since 2004	Silver	200,000^{‡}
^{‡} Sales+streaming figures based on certification alone.

== Philomena Begley version ==
"Blanket On The Ground"

Single by Philomena Begley

from the album Blanket On The Ground
- Released: August 4, 1975
- Genre: Country
- Length: 3:51
- Label: Sony Music Ireland
- Songwriter: Roger Bowling
- Producer: Nigel Wright

"Blanket On The Ground" was covered by Country music artist Philomena Begley as the lead single from her 1975 LP of the same name. The single was released on August 4, 1975, in Ireland and August 6, 1975, in the United Kingdom. The LP was re-released on CD in 1988.

=== Background ===
Begley's cover took her to number five in the Irish chart. Spears also released the song in the United Kingdom and in Ireland at the same time as Begley, but Begley's version received the highest sales, as Spears' version only went to number 11. Begley occasionally performed the song with Spears and later recorded a tribute song to her after the American star's death in 2011. Begley's edition has been re-recorded a number of times since and is featured on her 'Greatest Hits' album.

=== Chart performance ===
Chart (1975)	Peak position
Ireland (IRMA)	1
UK Chart	4
