= Mr. Walker, It's All Over =

Single by Billie Jo Spears

from the album Mr. Walker, It's All Over!
- B-side: "Tips and Tables"
- Released: March 1969
- Recorded: January 1969
- Studio: Columbia (Nashville, Tennessee)
- Genre: Country-pop
- Length: 2:59
- Label: Capitol
- Songwriter(s): Gene Crysler
- Producer(s): Kelso Herston

Billie Jo Spears singles chronology
"The Harper Valley PTA" (1969)	"Mr. Walker, It's All Over" (1969)	"Stepchild" (1969)

"Mr. Walker, It's All Over" is a song written by Gene Crysler that was originally recorded by American country artist, Billie Jo Spears. It was released as a single via Capitol Records and reached the top ten of North American country charts in 1969. It also reached charting positions on the North American pop charts. The song described how a New York City secretary fought sexual harassment and discrimination in the work place. It became Spears's breakthrough commercial success and was followed by a corresponding album of the same name.

== Background and recording ==
The feminist movement of the 1960s would inspire a generation of songs. Several recordings by Loretta Lynn and Tammy Wynette that reflected a woman's point of view had become country music commercial successes. Some recordings specifically focused on telling the stories of women in the workforce. This would inspire the composing of "Mr. Walker, It's All Over". The song described how a New York City secretary stands up against sexual harassment and discrimination in the work place.

Billie Jo Spears would record the Gene Crysler-penned song first. After several failed recordings at United Artists Records, Spears moved to the Capitol label in 1966. She had yet to achieve a commercial breakthrough. Capitol first released Spears's version of "Harper Valley PTA", but it would first become a success for Jeannie C. Riley. She would record "Mr. Walker, It's All Over" as her next single in January 1969. It was produced by Kelso Herston at the Columbia Studios in Nashville, Tennessee.

== Critical reception and legacy ==
"Mr. Walker, It's All Over" received positive reviews while also being considered on its impact. Writers Mary A. Bufwack and Robert K. Oermann called it an "assertive song". They also spoke of its societal influence, commenting that Spears "lifted her voice for the new secretarial army". Bobby Moore of Wide Open Country commented, "'Mr. Walker, It's All Over' found crossover success in its time and deserves further consideration 50 years later as one of popular culture's boldest statements against sexual harassment in the workplace."

Richie Unterberger spoke of the song in reviewing Spears's album of the same name: "The title track of Billie Jo Spears's 1969 LP Mr. Walker, It's All Over was a big country hit, and it guaranteed a big audience in the small towns that form much of the backbone of the country listenership with its sassy put down of the New York lifestyle." Billboard named it among its "Top 100 Best Songs of 1969". Writers commented, "The song’s biting response to workplace harassment feels just as sharp 50 years later, and the lyrical detail is evocative enough in its Manhattan scene-setting that it feels like an entire Mad Men episode in its three-minute runtime."

== Release and chart performance ==
"Mr. Walker, It's All Over" was released as a single by Capitol Records in March 1969. It was backed on the B-side by the song, "Tips and Tables". It was distributed as a seven-inch vinyl single. The song entered America's Billboard Hot Country Songs chart in April 1969. It spent a total of 13 weeks, reaching the number four position in June 1969. It also spent four weeks on the Billboard Hot 100, climbing to number 80 in May 1969. It reached similar positions on Canada's RPM charts, reaching number ten on its Country Tracks chart and number 85 on its Top Pop Singles chart. The song was later released on Spear's second Capitol studio album, also titled Mr. Walker, It's All Over!.

== Track listing ==
7" vinyl single

- "Mr. Walker, It's All Over" – 2:59
- "Tips and Tables" – 2:54

== Charts ==
=== Weekly charts ===
Weekly chart performance for "Mr. Walker, It's All Over"
Chart (1969)	Peak position
Canada Country Tracks (RPM)	10
Canada Top Pop Singles (RPM)	85
US Billboard Hot 100	80
US Hot Country Songs (Billboard)	4
