= Billie Jo Spears discography =

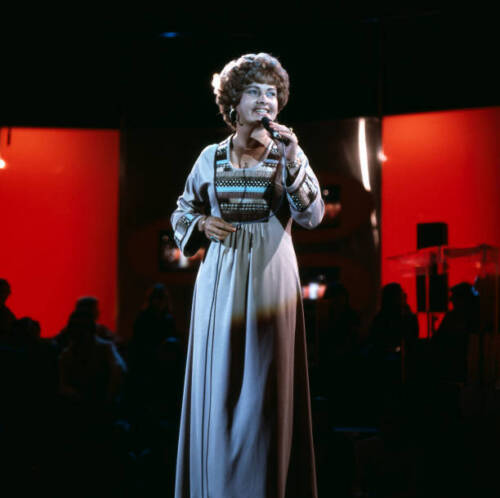
- Billie Jo Spears, 1976.
- Studio albums: 24
- Compilation albums: 14
- Singles: 53
- Video albums: 1
- Other charted songs: 1
- Other appearances: 1

The discography of American country artist Billie Jo Spears contains 24 studio albums, 14 compilation albums, one video album, 53 singles, one charting song and has appeared on one album. Spears' first singles were issued at United Artists Records before switching to Capitol Records. The 1969 single "Mr. Walker, It's All Over" reached the top ten on the American and Canadian country songs charts. An album of the same name followed that reached the top 30 on the American country albums chart. Her remaining years with Capitol Records failed to prove any further commercial success. The label issued four more studio albums by Spears through 1971, alongside four more top 40 singles.

Returning to United Artists Records, Spears' second label release was the number-one country song "Blanket on the Ground". The song became a top-20 single internationally, including reaching number six on the United Kingdom singles survey. It appeared as the title track of a studio album of the same, which reached the top five of the American country albums chart. Spears had several more top-ten and -twenty singles during the decade. In 1976, she reached the top five in the United Kingdom and the North American country charts with the singles "What I've Got in Mind" and "Misty Blue". Spears' 1976 album, What I've Got in Mind, was her first to reach positions on the United Kingdom albums chart. She also collaborated with Del Reeves on two 1976 singles and a studio album.

Spears had eight more singles reach the North American country charts' top 20 during the decade. This included "Stay Away from the Apple Tree" (1975), "Never Did Like Whiskey" (1976), "I'm Not Easy" (1977), "Lonely Hearts Club" (1977) and "'57 Chevrolet" (1978). The 1977 single "If You Want Me" reached number eight on the American country survey. These recordings also reached charts in Australia and the United Kingdom. The subsequent albums I'm Not Easy (1976), If You Want Me (1977) and Lonely Hearts Club (1978) reached chart positions on the American country albums survey. Her cover of "I Will Survive" (1979) reached the top ten of the Canadian country chart, as well as charting in the United States and the United Kingdom.

Spears had two more top-20 singles in the United States with "Standing Tall" (1980) and a cover of "Your Good Girl's Gonna Go Bad" (1981). Her 1980 album, Standing Tall, was her final to chart in the United States. Spears' final studio recording for the United Artists/Liberty labels was Only the Hits (1981). She continued recording studio albums during the 1980s and 1990s. This included a 1986 eponymous disc with the MCA and Dot labels, and also 1991's Unmistakably and 1996's Outlaw Woman.

== Albums ==
=== Studio albums ===
List of albums, with selected chart positions and certifications, showing other relevant details
Title	Album details	Peak chart positions		Certifications
Title	Album details	US Cou.	UK	Certifications
The Voice of Billie Jo Spears	Released: November 1968; Label: Capitol; Formats: LP	—	—	
Mr. Walker, It's All Over!	Released: May 1969; Label: Capitol; Formats: LP	26	—	
Miss Sincerity	Released: November 1969; Label: Capitol; Formats: LP	41	—	
With Love, Billie Jo Spears	Released: March 1970; Label: Capitol; Formats: LP	—	—	
Country Girl	Released: August 1970; Label: Capitol; Formats: LP	—	—	
Just Singin'	Released: February 1971; Label: Capitol; Formats: LP	—	—	
Blanket on the Ground	Released: February 1975; Label: United Artists; Formats: LP, cassette	4	—	BPI: Silver
Billie Jo	Released: October 1975; Label: United Artists; Formats: LP, cassette	45	—	
What I've Got in Mind	Released: June 1976; Label: United Artists; Formats: LP, cassette	7	46	BPI: Silver
By Request: Del and Billie Jo (with Del Reeves)	Released: August 1976; Label: United Artists; Formats: LP, cassette	46	—	
I'm Not Easy	Released: November 1976; Label: United Artists; Formats: LP	36	—	
If You Want Me	Released: June 1977; Label: United Artists; Formats: LP, cassette	39	—	
Lonely Hearts Club	Released: February 1978; Label: United Artists; Formats: LP, cassette	46	—	
Love Ain't Gonna Wait for Us	Released: October 1978; Label: United Artists; Formats: LP, cassette	—	—	
I Will Survive	Released: May 1979; Label: United Artists; Formats: LP, cassette	—	—	
Standing Tall	Released: February 1980; Label: United Artists; Formats: LP, cassette	70	—	
Only the Hits	Released: February 1981; Label: Liberty; Formats: LP, cassette	—	—	
Country Girl	Released: 1981; Label: Warwick; Formats: LP, cassette	—	17	BPI: Gold
BJ – Billie Jo Spears Today	Released: October 1983; Label: Ritz; Formats: LP	—	—	
We Just Came Apart at the Dreams	Released: 1984; Label: Premier; Formats: LP, cassette	—	—	
Billie Jo Spears	Released: 1986; Label: Dot/MCA; Formats: LP, cassette	—	—	
Unmistakably	Released: 1991; Label: Broadland/Etude; Formats: CD	—	—	
Outlaw Woman	Released: May 1996; Label: Carlton; Formats: CD	—	—	
The Best of Billie Jo Spears: New Recordings of Her Greatest Hits...and More...	Released: 1998; Label: K-tel; Formats: CD	—	—	
"—" denotes a recording that did not chart or was not released in that territory.

=== Compilation albums ===
List of albums, with selected chart positions and certifications, showing other relevant details
Title	Album details	Peak chart positions	Certifications
Title	Album details	UK	Certifications
Faded Love	Released: June 1975; Label: Capitol; Formats: LP	—	
The Best of Billie Jo Spears	Released: 1976; Label: Capitol; Formats: LP	—	
The Best of Billie Jo Spears	Released: April 1979; Label: Capitol; Formats: LP	—	
The Billie Jo Spears Singles Album	Released: November 1979; Label: United Artists; Formats: LP, cassette	7	BPI: Gold
Country Giants (with George Hamilton IV)	Released: 1981; Label: Reader's Digest; Formats: LP	—	
The Best of Billie Jo Spears	Released: 1985; Label: Capitol; Formats: Cassette	—	
Ode to Billie Joe	Released: 1985; Label: Capitol; Formats: LP	—	
What I've Got in Mind	Released: 1985; Label: Capitol; Formats: LP	—	
Singles	Released: 1988; Label: Liberty; Formats: CD	—	
Country Classics	Released: 1991; Label: EMI; Formats: CD	—	
50 Original Tracks	Released: 1993; Label: EMI; Formats: CD	—	
The Best of Billie Jo Spears	Released: 1994; Label: Razor & Tie; Formats: CD	—	
The Best of Billie Jo Spears	Released: June 20, 2005; Label: EMI; Formats: CD	—	
The Ultimate Collection	Released: July 2, 2007; Label: EMI; Formats: CD	—	
"—" denotes a recording that did not chart or was not released in that territory.

== Singles ==
=== As a solo artist ===
List of singles, with selected chart positions, showing other relevant details
Title	Year	Peak chart positions								Album
Title	Year	US	US Cou.	AUS	CAN	CAN Cou.	IRE	ND	UK	Album
"Too Old for Toys, Too Young for Boys" (Note: Credited under the name "Billie Jo Moore".)	1953	—	—	—	—	—	—	—	—	—N/a
"If That's What It Takes"	1966	—	—	—	—	—	—	—	—	—N/a
"Not Enough of You to Go Around"	1966	—	—	—	—	—	—	—	—	—N/a
"Easy to Be Evil"	1967	—	—	—	—	—	—	—	—	—N/a
"The Harper Valley PTA"	1968	—	—	—	—	—	—	—	—	The Voice of Billie Jo Spears
"He's Got More Love on His Little Finger"	1968	—	48	—	—	—	—	—	—	The Voice of Billie Jo Spears
"Mr. Walker, It's All Over"	1969	80	4	—	85	10	—	—	—	Mr. Walker It's All Over
"Stepchild"	1969	—	43	—	—	—	—	—	—	Miss Sincerity
"Daddy, I Love You"	1969	—	40	—	—	44	—	—	—	With Love, Billie Jo Spears
"Midnight Train"	1970	—	—	—	—	—	—	—	—	With Love, Billie Jo Spears
"Marty Gray"	1970	—	17	—	—	27	—	—	—	Country Girl
"I Stayed Long Enough"	1970	—	30	—	—	—	—	—	—	Country Girl
"It Could 'A Been Me"	1971	—	23	—	—	—	—	—	—	—N/a
"Souvenirs and California Memories"	1971	—	68	—	—	—	—	—	—	—N/a
"Sunshine"	1972	—	—	—	—	—	—	—	—	—N/a
"Ease the Want in Me"	1972	—	—	—	—	—	—	—	—	—N/a
"See the Funny Little Clown"	1974	—	80	—	—	—	—	—	—	Blanket on the Ground
"Blanket on the Ground"	1975	78	1	20	—	2	11	13	6	Blanket on the Ground
"Stay Away from the Apple Tree"	1975	—	20	—	—	17	—	—	—	Billie Jo
"Silver Wings and Golden Rings"	1975	—	20	99	—	12	—	—	—	Billie Jo
"What I've Got in Mind"	1976	—	5	—	—	3	5	6	4	What I've Got in Mind
"Misty Blue"	1976	—	5	—	—	4	—	—	—	What I've Got in Mind
"Sing Me an Old Fashioned Song"	1976	—	—	78	—	—	9	—	34	What I've Got in Mind
"Never Did Like Whiskey"	1976	—	18	—	—	28	—	—	—	I'm Not Easy
"I'm Not Easy"	1977	—	11	—	—	29	—	—	—	I'm Not Easy
"If You Want Me"	1977	—	8	—	—	17	—	—	52 (Note: Chart position is from the official UK "Breakers List".)	If You Want Me
"Too Much Is Not Enough"	1977	—	18	97	—	11	—	—	—	If You Want Me
"Lonely Hearts Club"	1977	—	18	—	—	9	—	—	—	Lonely Hearts Club
"I've Got to Go"	1978	—	17	—	—	26	—	—	—	Lonely Hearts Club
"'57 Chevrolet"	1978	—	16	—	—	12	—	—	—	Lonely Hearts Club
"Love Ain't Gonna Wait for Us"	1978	—	24	—	—	47	—	—	—	Love Ain't Gonna Wait for Us
"Yesterday"	1979	—	60	—	—	35	—	—	—	Love Ain't Gonna Wait for Us
"I Will Survive"	1979	—	21	—	—	9	—	—	47	I Will Survive
"Livin' Our Love Together"	1979	—	23	—	—	38	—	—	—	I Will Survive
"Rainy Days and Stormy Nights"	1979	—	21	—	—	18	—	—	—	I Will Survive
"Standing Tall"	1980	—	15	—	—	9	—	—	—	Standing Tall
"Natural Attraction"	1980	—	39	—	—	—	—	—	—	Standing Tall
"Your Good Girl's Gonna Go Bad"	1980	—	13	—	—	—	—	—	—	Only the Hits
"What the World Needs Now Is Love"	1981	—	58	—	—	—	—	—	—	Only the Hits
"Apologizing Roses"	1982	—	—	—	—	—	—	—	—	—N/a
"We Just Came Apart at the Dreams"	1983	—	—	—	—	—	—	—	—	We Just Came Apart at the Dreams
"Swingin'"	1983	—	—	—	—	—	—	—	—	BJ – Billie Jo Spears Today
"Midnight Blue"	1983	—	39	—	—	—	—	—	—	—N/a
"Every Time Two Fools Collide"	1983	—	—	—	—	—	—	—	—	BJ – Billie Jo Spears Today
"Why Don't We Go Dancing"	1984	—	—	—	—	—	—	—	—	BJ – Billie Jo Spears Today
"Wisdom of a Fool"	1988	—	—	—	—	—	—	—	—	—N/a
"Blue Orleans"	1989	—	—	—	—	—	—	—	—	—N/a
"One Smokey Rose"	1991	—	—	—	—	—	—	—	—	Unmistakably
"—" denotes a recording that did not chart or was not released in that territory.

=== As a collaborative and featured artist ===
List of singles, with selected chart positions, showing other relevant details
Title	Year	Peak chart positions	Album
Title	Year	US Country	Album
"If Your Leaving Don't Kill Me" (with Roger Ricker)	1972	—	—N/a
"On the Rebound" (with Del Reeves)	1976	29	By Request: Del and Billie Jo
"Teardrops Will Kiss the Morning Dew" (with Del Reeves)	1976	42	By Request: Del and Billie Jo
"I Can Hear Kentucky Calling Me" (with Carey Duncan)	1983	—	—N/a
"The Second Time Around" (Brian Clough with special guest Billie Jo Spears)	1988	—	—N/a
"—" denotes a recording that did not chart or was not released in that territory.

== Other charted songs ==
List of songs, with selected chart positions, showing other relevant details
Title	Year	Peak chart positions	Album	Notes
Title	Year	US Country	Album	Notes
"Midnight Love"	1983	51	—N/a	(Note: B-side to the single "Midnight Blue".)

== Video albums ==
List of video albums, showing all relevant details
Title	Album details
Blanket on the Ground	Released: March 13, 2008; Label: Forever Music/Musicpro; Formats: DVD

== Other appearances ==
List of non-single guest appearances, with other performing artists, showing year released and album name
Title	Year	Other artist(s)	Album	Ref.
"What I've Got in Mind"	1998	Tom Astor	...Und Ich Bin Dein Freund	
