= The Billie Jo Spears Singles Album =

Compilation album by Billie Jo Spears
- Released: November 1979
- Recorded: 1974 – 1977
- Genre: Country
- Label: United Artists

Billie Jo Spears chronology
I Will Survive (1979)	The Billie Jo Spears Singles Album (1979)	Standing Tall (1980)

The Billie Jo Spears Singles Album is a compilation album by American country artist Billie Jo Spears. It was released in November 1979 via United Artists Records. Two versions of the album were issued with different track listings. A North American version with ten tracks and an international version with 14 tracks were both distributed. The international version charted on the UK Albums Chart and later certified gold from the British Phonographic Industry.

== Background and content ==
Billie Jo Spears reached her career peak when she returned to United Artists Records in the 1970s. She had three top ten singles and one chart-topping single. Several more made the top 20 through the early eighties. Her first notable compilation album from the label was 1979's The Billie Jo Spears Singles Album. The disc featured popular singles by Spears originally recorded between 1974 and 1977.

Two versions of The Billie Jo Spears Singles Album were released for two different markets. The North American version consisted of ten tracks. The international version consisted of 14 tracks. The North American version contained Spears's most well-known singles in the United States and Canada. This included the number one song, "Blanket on the Ground", and her three top ten singles: "What I've Got in Mind", "Misty Blue" and "If You Want Me". The international version added several songs, including "Sing Me an Old Fashioned Song" (a popular recording in Ireland and the United Kingdom) and "Every Time I Sing a Love Song".

== Release, reception and chart performance ==
The Billie Jo Spears Singles Album was released in November 1979 on United Artists Records. It was distributed as both a vinyl LP and as a cassette. It received positive reception following its release from Cashbox magazine. Reviewers called the disc "a sure winner for any country fan" and concluded that it was a "super album from a super singer". AllMusic rated the album 4.5 out of 5 possible stars. The album spent 17 weeks on the UK Albums Chart, peaking at number seven position. It was Spears's only top ten album in the United Kingdom.

== Track listings ==
=== North American version ===
Side one
No.	Title	Writer(s)	Length
1.	"Blanket on the Ground"	R. Bowling	2:32
2.	"Misty Blue"	B. Montgomery	2:35
3.	"I Will Survive"	D. Fekaris; F. Perren	3:16
4.	"Stay Away from the Apple Tree"	L. Butler; R. Bowling	2:46
5.	"What I've Got in Mind"	K. O'Dell	2:42

Side two
No.	Title	Writer(s)	Length
1.	"(Hey Won't You Play) Another Somebody Done Somebody Wrong Song"	L. Butler; C. Moman	3:24
2.	"Love Ain't Gonna Wait for Us"	L. Butler; B. Peters	2:52
3.	"If You Want Me"	B. Peters	2:22
4.	"Never Did Like Whiskey"	K. O'Dell	2:08
5.	"Silver Wings and Golden Rings"	M. A. Leikin; G. Sklerov	3:25

=== International version ===
Side one
No.	Title	Writer(s)	Length
1.	"Blanket on the Ground"	R. Bowling	2:32
2.	"Silver Wings and Golden Rings"	M. A. Leikin; G. Sklerov	3:27
3.	"(Hey Won't You Play) Another Somebody Done Somebody Wrong Song"	L. Butler; C. Moman	3:18
4.	"What I've Got in Mind"	K. O'Dell	2:42
5.	"Sing Me an Old Fashioned Song"	L. Henley; J. Slate	3:36
6.	"Every Time Two Fools Collide"	J. Dryer; J. Tweel	2:53
7.	"If You Want Me"	B. Peters	2:23

Side two
No.	Title	Writer(s)	Length
1.	"Every Time I Sing a Love Song"	M. A. Leikin; G. Sklerov	3:19
2.	"Misty Blue"	B. Montgomery	2:35
3.	"Never Did Like Whiskey"	K. O'Dell	2:08
4.	"I've Got to Go"	R. Bowling; L. Butler	2:37
5.	"Lonely Hearts Club"	R. Bowling; L. Butler; G. Simmons	2:41
6.	"'57 Chevrolet"	R. Bowling	2:50
7.	"Love Ain't Gonna Wait for Us"	L. Butler; B. Peters	2:53

== Technical personnel ==
All credits are adapted from the liner notes of The Billie Jo Spears Singles Album.

- BilBo – Lacquer cut
- Paul Cemmick – Illustration
- Phil Jude – Photography
- Iain McClay – Compilied by
- John Pasche – Art direction
- Shoot That Tiger! – Design

== Chart performance ==
Chart (1979)	Peak position
UK Albums (OCC)	7

== Certifications ==
Region	Certification	Certified units/sales
United Kingdom (BPI)	Gold	100,000^{^}
^{^} Shipments figures based on certification alone.
