= Love Ain't Gonna Wait for Us (album) =

Lonely Hearts Club

Studio album by Billie Jo Spears
- Released: October 1978
- Recorded: August 1978
- Studio: Jack Clement Recording (Nashville, Tennessee)
- Genre: Country; country pop
- Label: United Artists
- Producer: Larry Butler

Billie Jo Spears chronology
Lonely Hearts Club (1978)	Lonely Hearts Club (1978)	I Will Survive (1979)

Singles from Love Ain't Gonna Wait for Us
- 1. "Love Ain't Gonna Wait for Us" Released: October 1978; 2. "Yesterday" Released: January 1979

Love Ain't Gonna Wait for Us is a studio album by American country artist Billie Jo Spears. It was released in October 1978 via United Artists Records and contained ten tracks. The disc featured mostly new recordings, along with several cover tunes. It featured a country pop production, overseen by Larry Butler. Two singles were spawned from the album: the title track and a cover of "Yesterday". It received a positive reception from Cashbox magazine.

== Background and recording ==
Billie Jo Spears reached her career zenith while recording for United Artists Records in the 1970s. She topped the country charts with "Blanket on the Ground" and reached the top ten with "What I've Got in Mind", "Misty Blue" and "If You Want Me". A series of other singles also reached the top 20 like "'57 Chevrolet" and "Lonely Hearts Club". A series of albums were also issued by her label, including 1978's Love Ain't Gonna Wait for Us. The project was recorded at the Jack Clement Recording Studio in Nashville, Tennessee. Sessions were produced by Larry Butler and were held in August 1978.

== Content ==
Love Ain't Gonna Wait for Us was a collection of ten tracks. Several original songs were featured on the project, including the title track and "Standing Tall". Both were co-written by Larry Butler and Ben Peters. A new version of "Standing Tall" would be released as a single by Spears in 1980 and reach the country's top 20. It also featured two new recordings by Jerry Foster and Bill Rice: "Let's Make It You and Me in Love Again", "For the First Time in My Life" and "Why Did You Have to Be So Good". The latter would later be recorded by Dave & Sugar in 1979. Another cover was The Beatles's "Yesterday". Another track, "Slow Movin' Outlaw", was first recorded by Waylon Jennings for his 1974 album This Time.

== Release, chart performance, singles and reception ==
Love Ain't Gonna Wait for Us was released by United Artists Records in October 1978. The label distributed the disc as both a vinyl LP and a cassette. Cashbox magazine gave the album a positive reception in their December 1979 issue. "Lush production only adds to Spears' sensitive vocals. Best songs are 'Slow Movin' Outlaw,' 'For the First Time In My Life' and 'Love Ain't Gonna Wait For Us', they concluded. Two singles were spawned from the album. The first was the title track, also issued in October 1978. It reached number 24 on the American Billboard Hot Country Songs chart and number 47 on the Canadian RPM Country Tracks chart. In January 1979, "Yesterday" was spawned as the project's second single. It reached number 60 on the Billboard country chart and number 35 on the RPM country chart.

== Track listing ==
Side one
No.	Title	Writer(s)	Length
1.	"Love Ain't Gonna Wait for Us"	L. Butler; B. Peters	2:52
2.	"The Miracle of Love"	B. Peters	3:19
3.	"(Let's Make It You and Me) In Love Again"	J. Foster; B. Rice	2:31
4.	"Standing Tall"	L. Butler; B. Peters	3:03
5.	"If This Is Just a Game"	D. A. Coe	3:45

Side two
No.	Title	Writer(s)	Length
1.	"Why Did You Have to Be So Good"	J. Foster; B. Rice	2:27
2.	"For the First Time in My Life"	J. Foster; B. Rice	3:31
3.	"Slow Movin' Outlaw"	D. Moeller	3:30
4.	"Say It Again"	D. Moeller	3:13
5.	"Yesterday"	J. Lennon; P. McCartney	2:03

== Personnel ==
All credits are adapted from the liner notes of Love Ain't Gonna Wait for Us.

Musical personnel

- Tommy Allsup – Bass guitar
- Byron Bach – Strings
- Brenton Banks – Strings
- George Binkley III – Strings
- Marvin Chantry – Strings
- Steve Chapman – Guitar
- Stanley Chase – Drums
- Roy Christensen – Strings
- Ray Edenton – Guitar
- Paul Franklin – Steel guitar
- Carl Gorodetzky – Strings
- Lonnie Haight – Strings
- The Jordanaires – Background vocals
- Sheldon Kurland – Strings
- Larry Lee McFadden – Background vocals
- Bob Moore – Bass
- Ron Oates – Keyboards
- Jerry Reid – Background vocals, guitar
- Hargus "Pig" Robbins – Keyboards
- Billy Sanford – Guitar
- Jerry Shook – Guitar
- Steven Smith – Strings
- Billie Jo Spears – Lead vocals
- Gary Vanosdale – Strings
- Pamela Vanosdale – Strings

Technical personnel

- Larry Butler – Producer
- Bill Burks – Design
- Tom Gibbons – Photography
- Bill Justis – String arrangement
- Billy Sherrill – Engineer
- Bob Sowell – Mastering

== Release history ==
Region	Date	Format	Label	Ref.
Australia	October 1978	Vinyl LP	United Artists Records	
Germany	October 1978	Vinyl LP	United Artists Records	
North America	October 1978	Vinyl LP; cassette	United Artists Records	
United Kingdom	October 1978	Vinyl LP	United Artists Records	
