= Wanda Jackson Country! =

Studio album by Wanda Jackson
- Released: February 1970
- Recorded: 1967 – 1969
- Studio: Columbia Studio
- Genres: Country; Honky Tonk
- Label: Capitol
- Producers: Kelso Herston; Ken Nelson; George Richey

Wanda Jackson chronology
| Wanda Jackson in Person (1969) | Wanda Jackson Country! (1970) | A Woman Lives for Love (1970) |

Singles from Wanda Jackson Country!
- 1. "By the Time You Get to Phoenix" Released: January 1968; 2. "Everything's Leaving" Released: June 1969; 3. "My Big Iron Skillet" Released: September 1969; 4. "Two Separate Bar Stools" Released: December 1969

Wanda Jackson Country! is a studio album by American recording artist Wanda Jackson. It was released in February 1970 via Capitol Records and contained ten tracks. It was Jackson's fifteenth studio album released in her recording career and her fifteen with the Capitol label. The album included four single releases that made chart positions on the American country music survey: "By the Time You Get to Phoenix", "Everything's Leaving", "My Big Iron Skillet" and "Two Separate Bar Stools".

== Background and recording ==
Wanda Jackson recorded a series of Rockabilly selections for Capitol Records in the 1950s, with songs like "Fujiyama Mama" and "Let's Have a Party". She made the transition back into Country music with two top ten songs in 1961. During the remainder of the decade, she became more identified with the Country market, having further hit singles with "The Box It Came In" and "Tears Will Be the Chaser for Your Wine". Wanda Jackson Country! was among the studio albums Jackson cut for the Country audience. It was recorded between 1967 and 1969 at the Columbia Studio in Nashville, Tennessee. The sessions were produced by Kelso Herston, Ken Nelson and George Richey. It was her first album to include production credits by George Richey. In her autobiography, Jackson writes her dis-taste for Richey's production work on these sessions: "He wasn't making any suggestions, paying me any attention, or giving me any feedback. That just made me mad."

== Content ==
Wanda Jackson Country! consisted of ten tracks. The album included a mixture of original and cover tunes. Among its original tunes was "The Pain of It All", "Everything's Leaving", "Two Separate Bar Stools" and "My Big Iron Skillet". The latter recording was co-written by a friend of Jackson's husband who pitched the song to her. Cover recordings for the album included "Your Good Girl's Gonna Go Bad" and "Just Between You and Me". Also featured on the project is an answer song to Glen Campbell's "By the Time I Get to Phoenix". Jackson's husband re-worked the lyrics, along with Melvin Nash, which became "By the Time You Get to Phoenix".

== Release and singles ==
Wanda Jackson Country! was originally released in February 1970 on Capitol Records. The album marked Jackson's fifteen studio release in her career and her fifteenth for the Capitol label. It was originally issued as a vinyl LP, containing five songs on both sides of the record. In later years, it was re-released via Capitol Records Nashville to digital and streaming markets, which included Apple Music. A total of four singles were included on the album, beginning with "By the Time You Get to Phoenix" in January 1968. Two months later, it reached number 48 on the Billboard Hot Country Singles chart.

In June 1969, "Everything's Leaving" was issued as the second single from the album. The single eventually climbed to number 48 on the same Billboard chart. "My Big Iron Skillet" was issued as the third single in September 1969. The song became the album's highest-charting hit, peaking at number 20 on the Billboard country chart by November 1969. "Two Separate Bar Stools" was spawned as the final single from the album in December 1969. By February 1970, the song had peaked at number 35 on the Billboard country chart.

== Track listings ==
Side one
| No. | Title | Writer(s) | Length |
|---|---|---|---|
| 1. | "My Big Iron Skillet" | Bryan Creswell; Wilda Creswell | 2:11 |
| 2. | "Everything's Leaving" | Red Lane | 2:24 |
| 3. | "Two Separate Bar Stools" | Bill Graham | 2:25 |
| 4. | "You Created Me" | Curtiss Wayne | 2:11 |
| 5. | "Your Good Girl's Gonna Go Bad" | Billy Sherrill; Glenn Sutton | 2:07 |

Side two
| No. | Title | Writer(s) | Length |
|---|---|---|---|
| 1. | "Try a Little Kindness" | Bobby Austin; Curt Sapaugh | 2:17 |
| 2. | "Just Between You and Me" | Jack Clement | 2:16 |
| 3. | "The Pain of It All" | Jerry Vanable | 2:37 |
| 4. | "By the Time You Get to Phoenix" | Wendell Goodman; Melvin Nash; Jimmy Webb | 2:12 |
| 5. | "The Hunter" | Lane | 2:26 |

== Release history ==
| Region | Date | Format | Label | Ref. |
|---|---|---|---|---|
| Canada; United States | February 1970 | Vinyl | Capitol Records | |
| Australia | 1974 | Vinyl | World Record Club | |
| Australia | 1974 | Vinyl | World Cassette Club | |
| United States | 2010s | Digital; Streaming | Capitol Records Nashville | |
