= Tammy Wynette Remembered =

Compilation album by Various artists
- Released: September 8, 1998
- Genre: Country
- Length: 40:33
- Label: Asylum
- Producer: Buddy Cannon, Melissa Etheridge, Garth Fundis, Emmylou Harris, Wynonna Judd, John Leventhal, Michael Pepin, George Richey, John Shanks, Jerry Taylor, Joe Thomas, Brian Wilson, Norro Wilson, Wally Wilson

Professional ratings
Review scores
Source	Rating
AllMusic	3/5 stars

Tammy Wynette Remembered is a tribute album to Tammy Wynette. It was released on September 8, 1998, by Asylum Records, just five months after Wynette's death on April 6. The album peaked at number 18 on the Billboard Top Country Albums chart and number 111 on the all-genre Billboard 200.

== Track listing ==
No.	Title	Writer(s)	Performer(s)	Length
1.	"Stand by Your Man"	Billy Sherrill, Tammy Wynette	Elton John	4:28
2.	"'Til I Get It Right"	Larry Henley, Red Lane	Trisha Yearwood	4:04
3.	"D-I-V-O-R-C-E"	Bobby Braddock, Curly Putman	Rosanne Cash	2:45
4.	"Apartment No. 9"	Bobby Austin, Johnny Paycheck	Melissa Etheridge	3:36
5.	"Woman to Woman"	Sherrill	Wynonna Judd	3:56
6.	"Take Me to Your World"	Sherrill, Glenn Sutton	George Jones	3:00
7.	"Your Good Girl's Gonna Go Bad"	Sherrill, Sutton	K. T. Oslin	2:21
8.	"You and Me"	George Richey, Sherrill	Lorrie Morgan	3:33
9.	"I Don't Wanna Play House"	Sherrill, Sutton	Sara Evans	2:50
10.	"Golden Ring"	Braddock, Rafe Van Hoy	Linda Ronstadt, Emmylou Harris and Kate and Anna McGarrigle	3:59
11.	"'Til I Can Make It on My Own"	Richey, Sherrill, Wynette	Faith Hill	3:30
12.	"In My Room"	Gary Usher, Brian Wilson	Brian Wilson and Tammy Wynette	2:31

== Chart performance ==
Chart (1998)	Peak position
U.S. Billboard Top Country Albums	18
U.S. Billboard 200	111
Canadian RPM Country Albums	1
