= If You Want Me (Billie Jo Spears album) =

Studio album by Billie Jo Spears
- Released: June 1977
- Recorded: January – February 1977
- Studio: Jack Clement Recording Studio
- Genre: Country
- Label: United Artists
- Producer: Larry Butler

Billie Jo Spears chronology
I'm Not Easy (1977)	If You Want Me (1977)	Lonely Hearts Club (1978)

Singles from If You Want Me
- 1. "If You Want Me" Released: April 1977; 2. "Too Much Is Not Enough" Released: July 1977

If You Want Me is a studio album by American country artist Billie Jo Spears. In the United Kingdom, the album was titled as Every Time I Sing a Love Song It was released on United Artists Records in June 1977 and contained ten tracks. Most of the album's material were new recordings, along with some cover tunes. It was the twelfth studio album of her career. Two singles were included on the disc: the title track and "Too Much Is Not Enough". Both reached the top ten and top 20 of the North American country charts in 1977. The album itself also charted on the American country albums survey. It received mixed reviews from critics.

== Background, recording and content ==
Billie Jo Spears had her biggest commercial success during the 1970s with several top ten singles, including the chart-topping "Blanket on the Ground". Other top ten and top 20 singles included "What I've Got in Mind", "Misty Blue" and "If You Want Me". The latter inspired and helped form Spears's next studio album. The disc was recorded in sessions held between January and February 1977 at the Jack Clement Recording Studio in Nashville, Tennessee. The sessions were produced by Larry Butler.

If You Want Me was a collection of ten tracks. Most of the album's material were new recordings, such as the title track, "Too Much Is Not Enough", "Every Time I Sing a Love Song", "The End of Me" and several others. Also included are cover tunes, such as Kenny Rogers's top ten country single "Sweet Music Man" and Kris Kristofferson's top 40 pop single "Lovin' Her Was Easier (than Anything I'll Ever Do Again)".

== Release and critical reception ==
If You Want Me was released by United Artists Records in June 1977. It was distributed as both a vinyl LP and a cassette. In the United Kingdom, the album was issued under the name Every Time I Sing a Love Song and some releases featured a different cover art.

The album was given mixed reviews music publications. Billboard named it among its "Top Album Picks" in July 1977. "Spears' emotional and sometimes intense vocal style coupled with Larry Butler's production backup that utilizes lots of guitars, strings, steel and drums brings an interpretation of lyrics by some notable songwriters such as Kris Kristofferson, Kenny O'Dell, Kenny Rogers and Geoff Morgan to heights of pleasurable listening," the magazine commented. Alan Cackett of Country Music People magazine gave it an unfavorable review in 1978: "Too many of the slow ballads, which dominate the album, sink into sameness, as Billie Jo and producer Larry Butler work too closely toward the pop crossover market," he commented."

== Chart performance and singles ==
If You Want Me entered America's Billboard Top Country Albums chart in July 1977. It spent only five weeks on the chart, peaking at number 39 later in the month. It was Spears's final album to reach the country albums top 40. Two singles were spawned from the disc. The first was the title track, which served as the lead single and was released by United Artists in April 1977. It became Spears's final single to reach the top ten of the Billboard Hot Country Songs chart, peaking at number eight. It also reached number 17 on Canada's RPM Country Tracks chart in 1977. "Too Much Is Not Enough" was spawned as the second single in July 1977. It reached number 18 on the Billboard country songs chart and number 11 on the RPM country chart.

== Track listing ==
Side one
No.	Title	Writer(s)	Length
1.	"If You Want Me"	B. Peters	2:22
2.	"Every Time I Sing a Love Song"	M. A. Leikin; G. Sklerov	3:23
3.	"Too Much Is Not Enough"	K. O'Dell	2:13
4.	"Lovin' Him Was Easier (Than Anything I'll Ever Do Again)"	K. Kristofferson	3:20
5.	"Look Whose Man You Are"	M. A. Leikin; G. Sklerov	3:39

Side two
No.	Title	Writer(s)	Length
1.	"Sweet Music Man"	K. Rogers	3:23
2.	"Don't Ever Let Go of Me"	R. Bowling; L. Butler	2:23
3.	"The End of Me"	J. Chesnut	3:36
4.	"One More Time"	R. Bowling; H. Carlson	3:04
5.	"She's Out There Dancin' Alone"	G. Morgan	2:52

== Personnel ==
All credits are adapted from the liner notes of If You Want Me.

Musical personnel

- Tommy Allsup – Bass guitar
- Byron Bach – Strings
- Brenton Banks – Strings
- George Binkley III – Strings
- Jimmy Capps – Guitar
- Jerry Carrigan – Drums
- Marvin Chantry – Strings
- Roy Christensen – Strings
- Jimmy Colvard – Guitar
- Steve Davis – Piano
- Pete Drake – Steel guitar
- Ray Edenton – Guitar
- Jack Eubanks – Guitar
- Carl Gorodetzky – Strings
- Buddy Harman – Drums
- Sheldon Kurland – Strings
- Bob Moore – Bass
- George Richey – Piano
- Hargus "Pig" Robbins – Piano
- Billy Sanford – Guitar
- Pam Sixfin – Strings
- Steven Smith – Strings
- Billie Jo Spears – Lead vocals
- Gary Vanosdale – Strings

Technical personnel

- Larry Butler – Producer
- Bill Burks – Design
- Bill Justis – String arrangement
- The Jordanaires – Background vocals
- Ria Lewerke – Art direction
- Carol Montgomery – Background vocals
- Gary Regester – Photography
- Billy Sherrill – Engineer
- Bob Sowell – Mastering

== Chart performance ==
Chart (1977)	Peak position
US Top Country Albums (Billboard)	39

== Release history ==
Region	Date	Format	Label	Ref.
Germany	June 1977	Vinyl LP; cassette	United Artists Records	
North America	June 1977	Vinyl LP	United Artists Records	
United Kingdom	June 1977	Vinyl LP; cassette	United Artists Records	
