= Lonely Hearts Club =

Lonely Hearts Club may refer to:

== Film and broadcasting ==
- Lonely Hearts Club (Chinese: 怨婦俱樂部; pinyin: Yuàn fù jùlèbù), section of the film In Between
- The Lonely Hearts Club, a weekly radio-comedy program with Tony Martin

== Music ==
- Lonely Hearts Club, a 2015 album by Marco Restrepo
- Lonely Hearts Club, a 1978 album from Billie Jo Spears discography, or the title track
- "Lonely Hearts Club", a 2020 song by Winona Oak
- "Lonely Hearts Club", song by Marina from Electra Heart

== Other ==
- Lonely Hearts Club, an earlier fashion label from the creators of Lonely

== See also ==
- Lonely Hearts (disambiguation)
- Sgt. Pepper's Lonely Hearts Club Band, a 1967 album by the English rock band the Beatles
