= Lonely Hearts Club (Billie Jo Spears album) =

Studio album by Billie Jo Spears
- Released: February 1978
- Recorded: August 1977
- Studio: Jack Clement Recording (Nashville, Tennessee)
- Genre: Country; pop
- Label: United Artists
- Producer: Larry Butler

Billie Jo Spears chronology
If You Want Me (1977)	Lonely Hearts Club (1978)	Love Ain't Gonna Wait for Us (1978)

Singles from If You Want Me
- 1. "Lonely Hearts Club" Released: December 1977; 2. "I've Got to Go" Released: March 1978; 3. "'57 Chevrolet" Released: July 1978

Lonely Hearts Club is a studio album by American country artist Billie Jo Spears. It was released in February 1978 via United Artists Records and contained 11 tracks. The album featured mostly new recordings, which included three singles: the title track, "I've Got to Go" "'57 Chevrolet". All three recordings reached the top 20 of the American country chart, while also reaching top positions in Canada. The album itself reached the American country albums chart. Lonely Hearts Club was met with positive reviews from critics.

== Background, recording and content ==
Billie Jo Spears reached the peak of her career while recording for United Artists Records in the 1970s. She topped the country charts with "Blanket on the Ground" (1975) and had three top ten singles with "What I've Got in Mind" (1976), "Misty Blue" (1976) and "If You Want Me" (1977). A string of top 20 singles followed through the decade, including "Lonely Hearts Club". The song would serve as the title for Spears's 1978 studio album. The project was recorded in August 1977 at the Jack Clement Recording Studio, located in Nashville, Tennessee. The sessions were produced by Larry Butler.

Lonely Hearts Club consisted of 11 tracks. Featured were five songs written by Larry Butler: the title track, "There's More to a Tear (Than Meets the Eye)", "That's the Way It Is", "The Lovin' Kind" and "I've Got to Go". Songwriter Roger Bowling co-wrote the latter recordings with Butler, along with solely writing the track "'57 Chevrolet". Spears herself contributed to the writing of "There's More to a Tear (Than Meets the Eye)". The album project was described as having both traditional country and pop sounds.

== Release and critical reception ==
Lonely Hearts Club was released by United Artists Records in February 1978. It was the thirteenth studio album of Spears's career. The label distributed it as a vinyl LP and a cassette. The album was met with positive reviews. Cashbox magazine praised the production of Larry Butler in their review: "Larry Butler manages to dress up country music with pop flavor without destroying the basic feel'." They also described Spears as a "versatile vocalist" who often recorded material with a "strong storyline". Alan Cackett of Country Music People magazine called it "her most commercial album so far". Cackett also noted that Spears's vocal delivery was stronger on the album: "For the first time since she left Capitol, Billie Jo is allowed to use the full scope of her voice on an album without the listener having to strain to hear it through layers of instrumental work."

== Chart performance and singles ==
Lonely Hearts Club entered America's Billboard Top Country Albums chart in April 1978. It reached its peak position of 46 on the chart and spent three weeks on Billboard in total. It was Spears's second to last album appearance on the Billboard country survey. A total of three singles were spawned from the Lonely Hearts Club. The title track was the first single issued for the intended project. United Artists first released it in December 1977. It reached number 18 on the Billboard Hot Country Songs chart in America and number nine on Canada's RPM Country chart. "I've Got to Go" was released as the second single in March 1978. The single reached number 17 on the Billboard country chart and number 26 on the RPM country chart. "'57 Chevrolet" was then issued as the final single in July 1978. It reached number 16 on the Billboard country songs chart and number 12 on the RPM country tracks chart.

== Track listing ==
Side one
No.	Title	Writer(s)	Length
1.	"Lonely Hearts Club"	R. Bowling; L. Butler; G. Simmons	2:41
2.	"There's More to a Tear (Than Meets the Eye)"	R. Bowling; L. Butler; B. J. Spears	2:48
3.	"That's the Way It Is"	R. Bowling; L. Butler	3:04
4.	"The Lovin' Kind"	R. Bowling; L. Butler	3:20
5.	"Last Night Ev'ry Night"	B. Morrison; B. Zerface; J. Zerface	2:35

Side two
No.	Title	Writer(s)	Length
1.	"I've Got to Go"	R. Bowling; L. Butler	2:37
2.	"'57 Chevrolet"	R. Bowling	2:48
3.	"Lover's Reunion"	J. McCollum; D. Rutherford	3:36
4.	"His Little Something on the Side"	D. Chamberlain; J. Vest	2:39
5.	"All the Love I Have to Give You"	E. Bruce	2:03
6.	"The Last Rose of Summer"	J. Chesnut	2:57

== Personnel ==
All credits are adapted from the liner notes of Lonely Hearts Club.

Musical personnel

- Tommy Allsup – Bass guitar
- Byron Bach – Strings
- Brenton Banks – Strings
- George Binkley III – Strings
- Jimmy Capps – Guitar
- Jerry Carrigan – Drums
- Fred Carter – Guitar
- Marvin Chantry – Strings
- Roy Christensen – Strings
- Charles Cochran – Piano
- Jimmy Colvard – Guitar
- Pete Drake – Steel guitar
- Carl Gorodetzky – Strings
- Buddy Harman – Drums
- The Jordanaires – Background vocals
- Carol Montgomery – Background vocals
- Sheldon Kurland – Strings
- Bob Moore – Bass
- Hargus "Pig" Robbins – Piano
- Billy Sanford – Guitar
- Jerry Shook – Guitar
- Steven Smith – Strings
- Billie Jo Spears – Lead vocals
- Donald Teal – Strings
- Gary Vanosdale – Strings
- Bobby Wood – Piano

Technical personnel

- Larry Butler – Producer
- Bill Burks – Design
- Bill Justis – String arrangement
- Ria Lewerke – Art direction
- Billy Sherrill – Engineer
- Bob Sowell – Mastering

== Chart performance ==
Chart (1978)	Peak position
US Top Country Albums (Billboard)	46

== Release history ==
Region	Date	Format	Label	Ref.
Germany	February 1978	Vinyl LP	United Artists Records	
New Zealand	February 1978	Vinyl LP	United Artists Records	
North America	February 1978	Vinyl LP	United Artists Records	
United Kingdom	February 1978	Vinyl LP; cassette	United Artists Records	
