= Country Girl (1981 Billie Jo Spears album) =

Studio album by Billie Jo Spears
- Released: 1981
- Recorded: 1981
- Studio: Sound Emporium (Nashville, Tennessee)
- Genre: Country
- Label: Warwick
- Producer: Al DeLory; Billie Jo Spears

Billie Jo Spears chronology
| Only the Hits (1981) | Country Girl (1981) | BJ – Billie Jo Spears Today (1982) |

Country Girl is a studio album by American country artist Billie Jo Spears. It was released in 1981 via Warwick Records and contained 22 songs. The majority of the album's material were new recordings, along with three previously released songs. Most of the tracks were covers of previously cut material. It was later certified gold in the United Kingdom, where it was primarily sold. It would reach the top 20 of the UK Albums Chart.

== Background and recording ==
During the seventies decade, Billie Jo Spears had a string of top ten and top 20 singles on the country charts. These recordings were released on United Artists Records. In 1981, Spears departed the label and began recording material for albums devoted to her fan base in the United Kingdom. Many of Spears's seventies singles were popular in the United Kingdom and Spears would devote much of her touring and recording towards the British market. Country Girl was the first album project Spears recorded following her departure from United Artists. In July 1981, it was reported by Billboard magazine that Spears had begun the recording process for the album in Nashville, Tennessee. The project was co-produced by Spears herself, along with Al DeLory. Sessions were held in 1981 at the Sound Emporium in Nashville.

== Content ==
Country Girl was a collection of 22 tracks. Three of its songs were previously recorded: "Blanket on the Ground", "What I've Got in Mind" and "'57 Chevrolet". All three recordings were originally singles, reaching major positions in the American country chart and the UK Singles Charts. The remaining 19 tracks were new studio recordings for Spears. A majority of these songs were covers of previously recorded songs, such as "It's a Heartache", "All I Have to Do Is Dream", "Blue Bayou", "Here You Come Again" and "For the Good Times". These songs were described by the liner notes as "some of the finest songs to come our way during the past two or three decades."

== Release and chart performance ==
Country Girl was released by Warwick Records in 1981. It was offered as both a vinyl LP and a cassette with identical track listings. In 2006, it was re-released as a compact disc through the Prism Entertainment label. It was also issued under a new title, Country Girl: 20 Favorite Songs. It was later offered digitally through retailers such as Apple Music. The disc was promoted through a "big TV merchandising campaign", according to Record World magazine. Country Girl was one of three albums in Spears's career to make the UK Albums Chart. Spending nine weeks on the chart, it peaked at the number 17 position in November 1981.

== Track listing ==
The track listing is adapted from the liner notes of Country Girl. Song lengths are not included in the liner notes.

Side one

1. "Blanket on the Ground" – (Roger Bowling)
2. "Here You Come Again" – (Barry Mann, Cynthia Weil)
3. "Crystal Chandeliers" – (Ted Harris)
4. "What I've Got in Mind" – (Kenny O'Dell)
5. "Fire and Rain" – (James Taylor)
6. "Blue Blue Day" – (Don Gibson)
7. "Just the Way You Are" – (Billy Joel)
8. "It's a Heartache" – (Ronnie Scott, Steve Wolfe)
9. "All I Have to Do Is Dream" – (Boudleaux Bryant)
10. "This Ole House" – (Stuart Hamblen)
11. "Tennessee Waltz" – (Pee Wee King, Redd Stewart)

Side two

1. "'57 Chevrolet" – (Roger Bowling)
2. "Cryin' Time" – (Buck Owens)
3. "I'm Gonna Be a Country Girl Again" – (Buffy Sainte-Marie)
4. "For the Good Times" – (Kris Kristofferson)
5. "I'll Never Love This Way Again" – (Richard Kerr, Will Jennings)
6. "Love of the Common People" – (John Hurley and Ronnie Wilkins)
7. "Silver Threads and Golden Needles" – (Dick Reynolds, Jack Rhodes)
8. "Blue Bayou" – (Joe Melson, Roy Orbison)
9. "Rocky Top" – (Felice and Boudleaux Bryant)
10. "'Til I Get It Right" – (Larry Henley, Red Lane)
11. "Queen of the Silver Dollar" – (Shel Silverstein)

== Personnel ==
All credits are adapted from the liner notes of Country Girl.

Musical personnel

- Terry Bethel – Steel guitar
- George Binkley – Strings
- Stan Chase – Drums
- Carl Gorodetzky – Strings
- Shelly Kurland – Strings
- Tony Magilore – Keyboards
- Connie McCollister – Strings
- Terry McMillan – Harmonica
- Dennis Molchan – Strings
- The Nashville Edition – Background vocals
- Jerry Reid – Lead guitar, rhythm guitar
- Leon Rhodes – Rhythm guitar, Tic Tac bass guitar
- Billie Jo Spears – Lead vocals
- Henry Strzelecki – Bass guitar
- Samuel Terranova – Strings
- Charles Vaughn Jr. – Rhythm guitar
- Tommy Williams – Fiddle

Technical personnel

- JA – Lacquer cut
- Tony Byworth – Liner notes
- Al De Lory – Producer
- Brian Rogers – String arrangements
- Billie Jo Spears – Producer
- Jim Williamson – Engineer

== Chart performance ==
| Chart (1981) | Peak position |
|---|---|
| UK Albums (OCC) | 17 |

== Certifications ==
| Region | Certification | Certified units/sales |
|---|---|---|
| United Kingdom (BPI) | Gold | 100,000^{^} |
^{^} Shipments figures based on certification alone.

== Release history ==
| Region | Date | Format | Label | Ref. |
|---|---|---|---|---|
| Saudi Arabia | 1981 | Cassette | IMD | |
| United Kingdom | 1981 | Vinyl LP; cassette | Warwick Records | |
| North America | January 10, 2006 | Compact disc | Prism Entertainment | |
| North America | 2010s | Music download; streaming | Tin Toy | |
