= What I've Got in Mind =

What I've Got in Mind may refer to:

- "What I've Got in Mind" (song), a 1976 single by Billie Jo Spears
- What I've Got in Mind (album), a 1976 album by Billie Jo Spears
