= Only the Hits =

Studio album by Billie Jo Spears
- Released: February 1981
- Recorded: July 1980
- Studio: Sound Emporium (Nashville, Tennessee)
- Genre: Country; pop
- Label: Liberty
- Producer: Larry Butler

Billie Jo Spears chronology
Standing Tall (1980)	Only the Hits (1981)	Country Girl (1981)

Singles from Only the Hits
- 1. "Your Good Girl's Gonna Go Bad" Released: November 1980; 2. "What the World Needs Now Is Love" Released: March 1981

Only the Hits is a studio album by American country artist Billie Jo Spears. It was released in February 1981 on Liberty Records and contained ten tracks. The project was a collection of cover tunes, which mixed both country and pop songs. Of its tracks were two singles: "Your Good Girl's Gonna Go Bad" and "What the World Needs Now Is Love". Spears's version of "Your Good Girl's Gonna Go Bad" reached the top 20 of the American country songs chart. Billboard magazine gave the album an unfavorable review following its release.

== Background and recording ==
Billie Jo Spears had a series of top ten and top 20 songs on the North American country charts. This included the chart-topping "Blanket on the Ground", along with "What I've Got in Mind" and "If You Want Me". Her singles would find popularity in the United Kingdom, where Spears often devoted more of her career towards. Her final top 20 single was "Your Good Girl's Gonna Go Bad", which was included on Only the Hits. The album would be Spears's final with her long-time record label. The project was recorded at Sound Emporium, located in Nashville, Tennessee. Sessions were held in July 1980 and were produced by Larry Butler.

== Content ==
Only the Hits consisted of ten cover songs. The album was named for the fact the original recordings had been hits for other music artists. Seven of the project's songs had originally had been top ten or number one singles on the Billboard country chart: Anne Murray's "Snowbird", Don Williams's "Lay Down Beside Me", Larry Gatlin's "Broken Lady", Tammy Wynette's "Your Good Girl's Gonna Go Bad", Patsy Cline's "I Fall to Pieces" and Lynn Anderson's "(I Never Promised You A) Rose Garden". Also featured were songs that had originally been top ten Billboard pop singles: the Eagles's "Desperado", Ray Stevens's "Everything Is Beautiful", Simon and Garfunkel's "Bridge Over Troubled Water" and Jackie DeShannon's "What the World Needs Now Is Love".

== Release, reception and singles ==
Only the Hits was released in February 1981 on Liberty Records. It would be Spears's final album with the label. It was distributed as a vinyl LP and a cassette. In Europe, it was titled as Special Songs and included two additional songs previously released on Spears's earlier studio albums. The album was given a negative review from Billboard magazine in 1981. "What a remarkable voice like Spears' is doing amid this garland of pop perennials is a mystery. It's like using a chainsaw to slice white bread," they remarked. Two singles were included on the album. The first was Spears's cover of "Your Good Girl's Gonna Go Bad", which was released as a single in November 1980. It spent 13 weeks on the American Billboard Hot Country Songs, reaching number 13 in March 1981. It was Spears's final top 20 single there. Spears's cover of "What the World Needs Now Is Love" was released as the second single in March 1981. The song reached number 58 on the Billboard country chart later that year.

== Track listings ==
=== Only the Hits ===
Side one
No.	Title	Writer(s)	Original artist	Length
1.	"What the World Needs Now Is Love"	Burt Bacharach; Hal David	Jackie DeShannon	3:00
2.	"Snowbird"	Gene MacLellan	Anne Murray	2:16
3.	"Lay Down Beside Me"	Don Williams	Don Williams	3:07
4.	"Broken Lady"	Larry Gatlin	Larry Gatlin	2:30
5.	"Everything Is Beautiful"	Ray Stevens	Ray Stevens	4:13

Side two
No.	Title	Writer(s)	Original artist	Length
1.	"Desperado"	Glenn Frey; Don Henley	Eagles	3:06
2.	"Your Good Girl's Gonna Go Bad"	Billy Sherrill; Glenn Sutton	Tammy Wynette	2:23
3.	"I Fall to Pieces"	Hank Cochran; Harlan Howard	Patsy Cline	3:34
4.	"(I Never Promised You A) Rose Garden"	Joe South	Lynn Anderson	2:52
5.	"Bridge Over Troubled Water"	Paul Simon	Simon and Garfunkel	3:41

=== Special Songs ===
Side one
No.	Title	Writer(s)	Original artist	Length
1.	"What the World Needs Now Is Love"	Burt Bacharach; Hal David	Jackie DeShannon	3:00
2.	"Snowbird"	Gene MacLellan	Anne Murray	2:16
3.	"Lay Down Beside Me"	Don Williams	Don Williams	3:07
4.	"Broken Lady"	Larry Gatlin	Larry Gatlin	2:30
5.	"Everything Is Beautiful"	Ray Stevens	Ray Stevens	4:13
6.	"Heartbreak Hotel"	Mae Boren Axton; Tommy Durden; Elvis Presley	Elvis Presley	3:12

Side two
No.	Title	Writer(s)	Original artist	Length
1.	"Desperado"	Glenn Frey; Don Henley	Eagles	3:06
2.	"Your Good Girl's Gonna Go Bad"	Billy Sherrill; Glenn Sutton	Tammy Wynette	2:23
3.	"I Fall to Pieces"	Hank Cochran; Harlan Howard	Patsy Cline	3:34
4.	"(I Never Promised You A) Rose Garden"	Joe South	Lynn Anderson	2:52
5.	"Bridge Over Troubled Water"	Paul Simon	Simon and Garfunkel	3:41
6.	"Lovin' Him Was Easier (Than Anything I'll Ever Do Again)"	Kris Kristofferson	Kris Kristofferson	3:20

== Personnel ==
All credits are adapted from the liner notes of Only the Hits.

Musical personnel

- Larry Butler – Background vocals, keyboards
- Buzz Cason – Background vocals
- Jimmy Capps – Guitar
- Jerry Carrigan – Drums
- Ray Edenton – Guitar
- Lloyd Green – Steel guitar
- Sherilyn Kramer – Background vocals
- Sheldon Kurland Strings – Strings
- Bob Moore – Bass
- Leon Rhodes – Guitar
- Hargus "Pig" Robbins – Piano
- Billy Sanford – Guitar
- Billie Jo Spears – Guitar
- Wendy Suits – Background vocals
- Dennis Wilson – Background vocals

Technical personnel

- Bill Berks – Art direction
- Larry Butler – Producer
- Bill Burks – Design
- Lamar Fike – Management
- Tom Gibson – Photography
- Bill Justis – String arrangement
- Harold Lee – Engineer
- Glenn Meadows – Mastering
- Billy Sherrill – Engineer

== Release history ==
Region	Date	Format	Label	Ref.
Netherlands	February 1981	Vinyl LP	Liberty Records	
North America	February 1981	Vinyl LP; cassette	Liberty Records	
United Kingdom	February 1981	Vinyl LP; cassette	Liberty Records	
