= Standing Tall (Billie Jo Spears album) =

Studio album by Billie Jo Spears
- Released: February 1980
- Recorded: July 1979
- Studio: Jack Clement Recording (Nashville, Tennessee)
- Genre: Country
- Label: United Artists
- Producer: Larry Butler

Billie Jo Spears chronology
The Billie Jo Spears Singles Album (1979)	Standing Tall (1980)	Only the Hits (1981)

Singles from Standing Tall
- 1. "Standing Tall" Released: February 1980; 2. "Natural Attraction" Released: June 1980

Standing Tall is a studio album by American country artist Billie Jo Spears. It was released in February 1980 via United Artists Records and contained ten tracks. The collection contained cover songs along with new material. Of its new recordings were two singles: the title track and "Natural Attraction". The title tune was a top 20 single on the American country chart and a top ten single on the Canadian country chart. The album reached the top 70 of the American country albums chart and received positive reviews from critics.

== Background and recording ==
Billie Jo Spears had a string of popular country singles and albums during the seventies decade. Among them was the chart-topping song "Blanket on the Ground" and the top ten recordings "What I've Got in Mind" and "If You Want Me". Many of Spears's recordings portrayed female survivors. This included the 1980 single "Standing Tall". The song's success inspired the title of Spears's 1980 album project. The disc was recorded in July 1979 at the Jack Clement Recording Studio, located in Nashville, Tennessee. The project was produced by Larry Butler.

== Content ==
Standing Tall consisted of ten tracks. Several of the project's songs were cover tunes. Among them was "Callin' Baton Rouge", which was first cut by The Oak Ridge Boys and would become a chart-topping single a decade later by Garth Brooks. Another song, "Free to Be Lonely Again", was recorded and made a top 20 country single by Debby Boone. Boone's version appeared on the charts around the same time as Spears's album was issued. Another song Spears covered for Standing Tall was Gene Watson's "You Could Know as Much About a Stranger". Watson's version was first a top ten country single in 1976. New tracks included the title song, "Natural Attraction", "It Can Wait", "Freedom Song", "Love Ain't The Question (Love Ain't The Answer)" and "Any Old Wind That Blows".

== Release, reception, chart performance and singles ==
Standing Tall was released in February 1980 by United Artists Records. The disc was offered as both a vinyl LP and a cassette. It received positive reviews following its release. Cashbox magazine called it "solid country with a lot of class". The magazine further praised the production and Spears's vocal delivery: "The production of Larry Butler and the voice of Billie Jo Spears is an unbeatable combination and this album shows them at their finest." Billboard magazine named it among its "Top Album Picks" and described it as "a tasty collection of songs". While Billboard mostly praised the project, they did give to negative criticism to the project's "overabundance of strings".

Standing Tall spent two weeks on the American Billboard Top Country Albums chart, peaking at number 70 in May 1980. It was Spears's lowest charting album on the publication and her final to chart. Two singles were spawned from Standing Tall. The first was its title track, which was issued in February 1980. It reached number 15 on the Billboard Hot Country Songs chart and climbed to number nine on the Canadian RPM Country Tracks chart. It was followed by the single "Natural Attraction" in June 1980. It only reached the Billboard Hot Country Songs chart, peaking at number 39.

== Track listing ==
Side one
No.	Title	Writer(s)	Length
1.	"Standing Tall"	Larry Butler; Ben Peters	3:06
2.	"Free to Be Lonely Again"	Diane Pfeifer	2:43
3.	"Love Ain't the Question (Love Ain't the Answer)"	Hazel Smith	3:35
4.	"Callin' Baton Rouge"	Dennis Linde	2:21
5.	"It Can Wait"	Peters	2:50

Side two
No.	Title	Writer(s)	Length
1.	"Natural Attraction"	Linde; Alan Rush	3:23
2.	"Let-Down-Your-Hair-Sweet-Lady-Man"	Bob Morrison; Bill Zerface; Jim Zerface	2:18
3.	"You Could Know as Much About a Stranger"	Nadine Bryant	3:14
4.	"Freedom Song"	Stephanie Boosahda; Gary Tedder	2:54
5.	"Any Old Wind That Blows"	Deena Kaye Rose	3:07

== Personnel ==
All credits are adapted from the liner notes of Standing Tall.

Musical personnel

- Tommy Allsup – Bass guitar
- Jimmy Capps – Guitar
- Stanley Chase – Drums
- Pete Drake – Steel guitar
- Ray Edenton – Guitar
- The Jordanaires – Background vocals
- Hargus "Pig" Robbins – Piano
- Billy Sanford – Guitar
- Billie Jo Spears – Lead vocals
- Sheldon Kurland Strings – Strings
- Wendy Suits – Background vocals

Technical personnel

- Bill Berks – Art direction
- Larry Butler – Producer
- Bill Burks – Design
- Bill Justis – String arrangement
- Glenn Meadows – Mastering
- Billy Sherrill – Engineer

== Chart performance ==
Chart (1980)	Peak position
US Top Country Albums (Billboard)	70

== Release history ==
Region	Date	Format	Label	Ref.
Germany	February 1980	Vinyl LP	EMI; Electrola; United Artists	
North America	February 1980	Vinyl LP; cassette	United Artists	
United Kingdom	February 1980	Vinyl LP	United Artists	
