= My Big Iron Skillet =

Single by Wanda Jackson

from the album Wanda Jackson Country!
- B-side: "The Hunter"
- Released: September 1969
- Recorded: March 29, 1969; Nashville, Tennessee, U.S
- Genre: Country
- Label: Capitol
- Songwriters: Bryan Creswell, Wilda Creswell
- Producer: Ken Nelson

Wanda Jackson singles chronology
| "Everything's Leaving" (1969) | "My Big Iron Skillet" (1969) | "Two Separate Bar Stools" (1969) |

"My Big Iron Skillet" is a song written by Bryan Creswell and Wilda Creswell. It was recorded and released as a single by American country, rock, and Christian artist, Wanda Jackson.

The song was recorded at the Columbia Recording Studio on March 29, 1969 in Nashville, Tennessee, United States. "My Big Iron Skillet" was officially released as a single in September 1969, peaking at number twenty on the Billboard Magazine Hot Country Singles chart. It was her first top-twenty single since 1967. The song was issued on Jackson's 1970 studio album, Wanda Jackson Country!.

Music journalist, Robert K. Oermann and anthropologist, Mary A. Bufwack called this song, "threatening" since Jackson threatens to kill the song's antagonist with a kitchen skillet.

== Chart performance ==
| Chart (1969) | Peak position |
|---|---|
| U.S. Billboard Hot Country Singles | 20 |
