= I'm Not Easy =

Single by Billie Jo Spears

from the album I'm Not Easy
- B-side: "Too Far Gone"
- Released: January 1977
- Recorded: July 1976
- Studio: Jack Clement Recording (Nashville, Tennessee)
- Genre: Country; Countrypolitan
- Length: 3:03
- Label: United Artists
- Songwriter(s): David Chamberlain; Jim Vest
- Producer(s): Larry Butler

Billie Jo Spears singles chronology
"Never Did Like Whiskey" (1976)	"I'm Not Easy" (1977)	"If You Want Me" (1977)

"I'm Not Easy" is a song first recorded by American country artist Billie Jo Spears. Written by David Chamberlain and Jim Vest, it was released as a single in 1977 and became top 20 charting country single in the United States. The song also served as the title track to Spears's 1976 studio album.

== Background and recording ==
In 1975, Billie Jo Spears topped the country charts after years of limited commercial success. Songs liker "Blanket on the Ground", "What I've Got in Mind" and "Misty Blue" reached the country charts top ten. They would be followed by several more top 20 singles during the seventies decade. Among these top 20 recordings was 1977's "I'm Not Easy". It was written by David Chamberlain and Jim Vest. "I'm Not Easy" was produced by Larry Butler in July 1976 at the Jack Clement Recording Studio in Nashville, Tennessee.

== Release, chart performance and reception ==
"I'm Not Easy" first served as the title track to Spears's 1976 studio album. It was then released as a single in January 1977 on United Artists Records. It was backed on the B-side by a cover of Tammy Wynette's "Too Far Gone". It was distributed as a seven-inch vinyl disc. It debuted on the American Billboard Hot Country Songs chart in January 1977. It reached the number 11 position in March 1977 after spending 13 weeks on the chart. On the Canadian RPM Country Tracks chart, the it climbed to the number 29 position.

In reviewing the I'm Not Easy LP, AllMusic's Greg Adams described the title track as "painfully forlorn".

== Track listing ==
7" vinyl single

- "I'm Not Easy" – 3:03
- "Too Far Gone" – 3:15

== Charts ==
Weekly chart performance for "I'm Not Easy"
Chart (1976)	Peak position
Canada Country Tracks (RPM)	29
US Hot Country Songs (Billboard)	11
