= Stepchild (disambiguation) =

A stepchild is the daughter or son of one's spouse but not of oneself

Stepchild may also refer to:

- Stepchild (film), a 1947 American drama film
- "Stepchild", a song written by Bob Dylan as "Am I Your Stepchild?" (1978), sung by Solomon Burke on his 2002 album Don't Give Up on Me and by Jerry Lee Lewis on Rock & Roll Time 2014
- "Stepchild", a single by Billie Jo Spears from her 1969 album Miss Sincerity, see Billie Jo Spears discography
