= Too Much Is Not Enough (Billie Jo Spears song) =

Single by Billie Jo Spears

from the album If You Want Me
- B-side: "The End of Me"
- Released: July 1977
- Recorded: February 1977
- Studio: Jack Clement Recording (Nashville, Tennessee)
- Genre: Country
- Length: 2:13
- Label: United Artists
- Songwriter(s): Kenny O'Dell
- Producer(s): Larry Butler

Billie Jo Spears singles chronology
"If You Want Me" (1977)	"Too Much Is Not Enough" (1977)	"Lonely Hearts Club" (1977)

"Too Much Is Not Enough" is a song written by Kenny O'Dell that was originally recorded by American country artist Billie Jo Spears. Released as a single by United Artists Records, the song reached the top 20 of the North American country charts in 1977. It was released on Spears's 1977 studio album titled If You Want Me.

== Background and recording ==
Billie Jo Spears reached her commercial zenith during the 1970s with songs like "Blanket on the Ground", "What I've Got in Mind" and "Misty Blue". A string of top 20 singles followed through the seventies decade, all of which were released on United Artists Records. Of these top 20 singles was 1977's "Too Much Is Not Enough", which was written by Kenny O'Dell. O'Dell had been a frequent writer of Spears's most successful singles. The track was cut in July 1977 at the Jack Clement Recording Studio in Nashville, Tennessee in sessions held by Larry Butler.

== Release, chart performance and reception ==
"Too Much Is Not Enough" was first included on Spears's album, If You Want Me, which was issued in June 1977. The song was then issued as a single in July 1977 via United Artists Records. On the B-side was a track titled "The End of Me". It was issued as a seven-inch vinyl disc. "Too Much Is Not Enough" debuted on the American Billboard Hot Country Songs chart in August 1977. Spending a total of 13 weeks on the chart, it reached the number 18 position in October 1977. On the Canadian RPM Country Tracks chart, the song reached the number 11 position around the same period. It was also one of fourth singles to chart on Australia's Kent Music Report chart, peaking at number 97.

== Track listing ==
7" vinyl single

- "Too Much Is Not Enough" – 2:13
- "The End of Me" – 3:36

== Charts ==
Weekly chart performance for "Too Much Is Not Enough"
Chart (1977)	Peak position
Australia (Kent Music Report)	97
Canada Country Tracks (RPM)	11
US Hot Country Songs (Billboard)	18
