= Natural Attraction =

Single by Billie Jo Spears

from the album Standing Tall
- B-side: "You Could Know as Much About a Stranger"
- Released: June 1980
- Recorded: July 1979
- Studio: Jack Clement Recording (Nashville, Tennessee)
- Genre: Country
- Label: United Artists
- Songwriter(s): Dennis Linde; Alan Rush
- Producer(s): Larry Butler

Billie Jo Spears singles chronology
| "Standing Tall" (1980) | "Natural Attraction" (1980) | "Your Good Girl's Gonna Go Bad" (1980) |

"Natural Attraction" is a song originally recorded by American country artist Billie Jo Spears. It was composed by Dennis Linde and Alan Rush. Released as a single via United Artists Records, it reached the top 40 of the American country chart in 1980. It was the second single spawned from Spears's 1980 album Standing Tall.

== Background, recording, and release ==
Billie Jo Spears had a series of commercially successful years during the seventies, including the number one single "Blanket on the Ground" (1975) and the top ten single "Misty Blue" (1976). She continued having top 20 singles through 1981. One of her final top 40 singles on the label was 1980's "Natural Attraction". The song was written by Dennis Linde and Alan Rush. It was recorded at the Jack Clement Recording Studio in Nashville, Tennessee. The session was produced by Larry Butler.

"Natural Attraction" was first included as an album track on Spears's 1980 studio album titled Standing Tall. It was then spawned as its second single in June 1980 by United Artists Records. It was backed on the B-side by the song "You Could Know as Much About a Stranger". It was distributed as a seven-inch vinyl disc. The song debuted on the American Billboard Hot Country Songs chart. It spent a total of nine weeks there, peaking at number 39 in August 1980.

== Track listing ==
7" vinyl single

- "Natural Attraction" – 3:23
- "You Could Know as Much About a Stranger" – 3:14

== Charts ==
Weekly chart performance for "Natural Attraction"
| Chart (1980) | Peak position |
|---|---|
| US Hot Country Songs (Billboard) | 39 |
