= Brenda Lee (1991 album) =

Studio album by Brenda Lee
- Released: April 1991
- Genres: Country; blues; R&B
- Label: Warner Bros.
- Producers: Steve Buckingham; Jim Ed Norman; Eric Prestige

Brenda Lee chronology
Feels So Right (1985)	Brenda Lee (1991)	A Brenda Lee Christmas: In the New Old Fashioned Way (1991)

Singles from Brenda Lee
- 1. "Your One and Only" Released: March 1991; 2. "A Little Unfair" Released: May 1991

Brenda Lee is the thirty-second studio album by American singer, Brenda Lee. It was released in April 1991 by Warner Bros. Records and was her first studio album in five years. Lee was approached by a Warner Bros. executive who helped her secure a contract with his label. The 10-track album featured both new material as well as cover tunes like "Some of These Days" by Sophie Tucker. The album received a mixed reception from critics and only made the top 70 on the US Top Country Albums chart.

== Background ==
Brenda Lee was one of pop music's best-selling artists in the 1960s, with a string of top-10 and number one singles. She made a successful transition into the country genre in the 1970s with top 40 singles that ran through 1984. Her longtime label, MCA Records, dropped her in the mid-1980s and conflicts with the label through the end of the decade kept her away from recording any new material. During this time she appeared in a music video for k.d. lang, which caught the attention of Warner Bros Records executive, Carl Scott. In her autobiography, Lee explained that Scott believed "a still vibrant vocalist was going to waste" and helped her secure a contract with his label to make a new studio album.

== Recording and content ==
At the time of her signing, there was interest from both Mark Knopfler and Lenny Waronker (Warner's president) in producing Lee's label debut. However, Lee explained in her book that Warner instead chose Nashville's Jim Ed Norman and Eric Prestidge to produce the project. Steve Buckingham is also credited for producing the track "Your One and Only". The eponymous project consisted of ten tracks. In an interview with the The Albany Herald in 1991, Lee spoke of the album's song selection process, "I looked for songs I could sing and believe and make them believable. If you can't make them believable, you're not gonna reach anybody."

Despite looking for material in various US cities, most of the material was penned by Nashville songwriters. Along with new recordings, were songs first cut by other music artists. Among them was Sophie Tucker's "Some of These Days", a song Lee regularly performed onstage at the time prior to recording it. She also cut Lefty Frizzell's "A Little Unfair" and Billie Jo Spears's "Standing Tall". "Against My Will" was heard by Lee while watching its songwriter (Debra Hogan) perform it on The Nashville Network. The network then sent Lee a recording of the track. Country music group, The Forester Sisters, can be heard on the track "Love Is Fair".

== Critical reception ==
Professional ratings
Review scores
Source	Rating
AllMusic	2/5 stars

Brenda Lee received a mixed critical response following its release. Billboard praised the project, calling it "powerful" and having "vigor". "Material is well matched to Lee's voice and showcases the works of several songwriting masters," the publication concluded. Bill Bell of The Spokesman-Review highlighted Lee's return to recording and said the album was "not bad". Greg Adams of AllMusic only gave the album two out of five stars and wrote that it had "sterile instrumental tracks" along with "forgettable pop ballads of the sort that is too often heard on commercial country radio." Publications also took notice of the album's single releases. Billboard praised the single "Your One and Only", finding it to have "enthusiastic vocals" and "full-bodied instrumentation". Cashbox also spoke highly of the track, finding it to be "one heck of a commanding performance". However, in a separate review for the single "A Little Unfair", Billboard found it to "lack the spunk of her previous single ['Your One and Only']".

== Promotion, release singles and chart performance ==
Lee explained in her autobiography that Carl Scott wanted her to have a "makeover" for the album's release. Lee agreed to Scott's suggestion, losing several pounds, dying her hair blonde and updating her makeup. The label also had Lee embark on a promotional tour in the US cities of Atlanta, Dallas, Minneapolis and New York City. Brenda Lee was officially released in April 1991 by Warner Bros. Records and was offered in either compact disc (CD) or cassette formats. It marked Lee's first album of new material in five years when it was released. Brenda Lee rose to the number 67 on the US Billboard Top Country Albums chart in 1991, becoming her first album to make the chart since 1982's The Winning Hand and her lowest-peaking album on the chart. Two singles were spawned, its earliest being "Your One and Only" (issued in March 1991 by Warner Bros.). It rose to the number 85 position on Canada's RPM chart, becoming her first song to make the RPM chart since 1984 and the final to do so in her career. The second single spawned from the album was "A Little Unfair" in May 1991. In her autobiography, Lee expressed frustration in the album's lack of success, believing her age at the time was a factor. "I was forty-five when I recorded that album, and I was realistic enough to know that the business belonged to younger people," she wrote.

== Track listing ==
Brenda Lee track listing
No.	Title	Writer(s)	Length
1.	"Once Love Makes a Fool of You"	Beth Nielsen Chapman	4:08
2.	"Love Is Fair"	Jesse Winchester	4:14
3.	"Against My Will"	Debra Hogan	3:25
4.	"Lonely Too Long"	Gary Harrison; Karen Staley	3:39
5.	"Some of These Days"	Shelton Brooks	2:42
6.	"You Better Do Better"	Bucky Jones; Michael Garvin; Tom Shapiro	2:42
7.	"When He Leaves You"	Kent Robbins; Mike Reid	4:09
8.	"A Little Unfair"	Chuck Howard; Hank Cochran	3:05
9.	"Standing Tall"	Ben Peters; Larry Butler	3:11
10.	"Your One and Only"	Even Stevens; Hilary Kanter	3:08

== Personnel ==
All credits are adapted from the liner notes of Brenda Lee.

Musical personnel

- Gary Armstrong – Horns (track 5)
- Eddie Bayers – Drums (track 10)
- Lisa Bevel – Backing vocals
- Dennis Burnside – Piano
- Larry Byrom – Guitar (track 10)
- Mark Casstevens – Guitar (track 10)
- Carol Chase – Backing vocals
- The Forester Sisters – Backing vocals (track 2)
- Paul Franklin – Steel guitar
- Sonny Garrish – Steel guitar
- Steve Gibson – Electric guitar, mandolin
- Dennis Good – Horns (track 5)
- Mark Hammond – Drums
- Jim Horn – Horns (track 5)
- Christopher Harris – Backing vocals
- Mark Heimermann – Backing vocals
- John Hug – Acoustic guitar
- David Hungate – Bass (track 10)
- Mitch Humphries – Piano
- Roy Huskey – Upright bass
- Gary Janney – Backing vocals
- Jana King – Backing vocals
- Brenda Lee – Lead vocals
- Paul Leim – Drums
- Dennis Locorriere – Backing vocals
- Randy McCormick – Piano
- Terry McMillan – Percussion
- Phil Naish – Synthesizer
- Louis Nunley – Backing vocals (track 10)
- Mark O'Connor – Fiddle
- Billy Puett – Horns (track 5)
- Quitman Dennis – Horns (track 5)
- Cindy Richardson – Backing vocals
- Hargus "Pig" Robbins – Piano
- Matt Rollings – Synthesizer
- Charles L. Rose – Horns (track 5)
- Lisa Silver – Backing vocals
- George Tidwell – Horns (track 5)
- John Wesley Ryles – Backing vocals (track 10)
- Bergen White – Backing vocals
- Dennis Wilson – Backing vocals
- Glenn Worf – Bass
- Curtis Young – Backing vocals (track 10)
- Reggie Young – Electric guitar

Technical personnel

- Steve Buckingham – Producer (track 10)
- Danny Kee – Production assistant
- Kristen Lantz – Production assistant
- Marshall Morgan – Mixing (track 10)
- Jim Ed Norman – Producer
- Eric Prestidge – Engineer, mastering, mixing, producer
- Denny Purcell – Mastering
- James "Val" Veluntini – Assistant engineer

== Chart performance ==
Chart (1991)	Peak position
US Top Country Albums (Billboard)	67

== Release history ==
Release history and formats for Brenda Lee
Region	Date	Format	Label	Ref.
Various	April 1991	Compact disc (CD); cassette	Warner Bros. Records	
Various	Circa 2020	Music download; streaming	Warner Records	
