= Lonely Hearts =

Lonely Hearts, Lonelyhearts or Lonely Heart may refer to:

== Journalism ==
- Lonely hearts columns, personal advertisements
- Lonely hearts killer, a person who commits murder by contacting a victim via newspaper classified ads

== People ==
- The "Lonely Hearts Killers", Raymond Fernandez and Martha Beck, an American serial killer couple who met their unsuspecting victims through lonely hearts ads

== Entertainment and media ==
=== Film ===
- Miss Lonelyhearts, the name of Judith Evelyn's character in Alfred Hitchcock's 1954 film Rear Window
- Lonelyhearts, a 1958 American drama film starring Montgomery Clift
- Lonely Hearts (1970 film), a 1970 Italian romantic drama film
- Lonely Heart (1981 film), a Japanese mystery film
- Lonely Hearts (1982 film), an Australian drama film
- Lonely Heart (1985 film), a Japanese romantic fantasy film directed by Nobuhiko Obayashi
- Lonely Hearts (1991 film), an American film starring Eric Roberts
- Lonely Hearts (2006 film), an American film starring John Travolta, based on "The Lonely Hearts Killers", Fernandez and Beck
- Lonely Hearts, a 2007 UK short film starring Martin Freeman

=== Literature ===
- Miss Lonelyhearts, a 1933 novel by Nathanael West

=== Music ===
- The Lonely Hearts, a band from Nashville, Tennessee
- The Lonelyhearts, a band from Colorado and Iowa
- Lonely Heart (album), a 2007 album by Massacre
- "Lonely Heart" (Tammy Wynette song), a 1984 song by Tammy Wynette
- "Lonely Heart", a 1987 song by Richard Marx, from the album Richard Marx
- "Lonely Heart", a song by Irving Berlin
- "Lonely Hearts" (JoJo song), 2020
- "Lonely Hearts" (Miliyah Kato song), 2013
- "Lonely Heart", a 2020 song by 5 Seconds of Summer, from the album Calm

=== Television ===
- "Lonely Heart" (Angel), the second episode of the television show Angel
- "Lonely Hearts", a season 4 episode of the television show Cold Case
- "Lonelyhearts" (Grimm), the fourth episode in the first season of Grimm

== See also ==
- Sgt. Pepper's Lonely Hearts Club Band, the eighth studio album by the English rock band The Beatles
- Dear Lonely Hearts, a 1962 album by Nat King Cole
- "Lonely Hearts Club", a song by Marina and the Diamonds from Electra Heart
- Lonely Hearts Club (disambiguation)
