= Lonely Hearts Club (Billie Jo Spears song) =

Single by Billie Jo Spears

from the album Lonely Hearts Club
- B-side: "His Little Something on the Side"
- Released: December 1977
- Recorded: August 1977
- Studio: Jack Clement Recording Studio
- Genre: Country; Countrypolitan
- Length: 2:40
- Label: United Artists
- Songwriter(s): Roger Bowling; Larry Butler; Gene Simmons
- Producer(s): Larry Butler

Billie Jo Spears singles chronology
"Too Much Is Not Enough" (1977)	"Lonely Hearts Club" (1977)	"I've Got to Go" (1978)

"Lonely Hearts Club" is a song originally recorded by American country artist Billie Jo Spears. It was composed by Gene Simmons, Roger Bowling and Larry Butler. It was released as a single via United Artists Records in 1977, reaching the top 20 of the American country chart and the top ten of the Canadian country chart. It served as the title track of Spears's 1978 studio album.

== Background, content and recording ==
Billie Jo Spears reached the peak of her career while recording for United Artists Records during the 1970s. She reached the top of the country charts with 1975's "Blanket on the Ground", and reached the top ten with "What I've Got in Mind" (1976), "Misty Blue" (1976) and "If You Want Me" (1977). A string of singles also reached the country top 20 during the decade, which included "Lonely Hearts Club". The song was written by Roger Bowling, Larry Butler and Gene Simmons. The song described a woman who receives a letter from a lover. It was produced by Larry Butler at the Jack Clement Recording Studio in Nashville, Tennessee. The session was held in August 1977.

== Release, chart performance and reception ==
"Lonely Hearts Club" was released as a single by United Artists in December 1977. It was backed on the B-side by the track, "His Little Something on the Side". It was issued as a seven-inch vinyl disc. It debuted on America's Billboard Hot Country Songs chart in January 1978. It spent a total of 11 weeks on the chart, climbing to the number 18 position. It reached the top ten on Canada's RPM Country Tracks chart, peaking at number nine around the same time. It eventually served as the title track for Spears's 1978 studio album, which was also released by United Artists. The single was reviewed positively by Cash Box magazine in January 1978, describing it production as having "good guitar and banjo licks [that] keep this song rolling."

== Track listing ==
7" vinyl single

- "Lonely Hearts Club" – 2:40
- "His Little Something on the Side" – 2:38

== Charts ==
Weekly chart performance for "Lonely Hearts Club"
Chart (1977–1978)	Peak position
Canada Country Tracks (RPM)	9
US Hot Country Songs (Billboard)	18
