= Daddy, I Love You =

Single by Billie Jo Spears

from the album With Love, Billie Jo Spears
- B-side: "Look Out Your Window"
- Released: November 1969
- Recorded: June 1969
- Studio: Columbia (Nashville, Tennessee)
- Genre: Country-pop
- Length: 2:39
- Label: Capitol
- Songwriter(s): Jerry Foster; Bill Rice
- Producer(s): Kelso Herston

Billie Jo Spears singles chronology
"Stepchild" (1969)	"Daddy, I Love You" (1969)	"Midnight Train" (1970)

"Daddy, I Love You" is a song recorded by American country artist, Billie Jo Spears. It was written by Jerry Foster and Bill Rice. Released as a single in 1969, it reached the top 40 of the American country chart, along with charting on the Canadian country chart. It was included on Spears's studio album titled With Love, Billie Jo Spears.

== Background, recording, release and chart performance ==
After years of failed recordings, Billie Jo Spears rose to commercial success with the top ten country song, "Mr. Walker, It's All Over" (1969). Spears would have a series of charting singles on Capitol Records over the next several years. Among them was the single, "Daddy I Love You". The song was composed by Jerry Foster and Bill Rice. It was recorded at the Columbia Studios in Nashville, Tennessee. It was produced by Kelso Herston in June 1969.

"Daddy, I Love You" was released as a single by Capitol Records in June 1969. It was backed on the B-side by the song, "Look Out Your Window". It was distributed as a seven-inch vinyl record. The track entered the American Billboard Hot Country Songs chart in December 1969. It spent ten weeks there, reaching number 40 by February 1970. It became the second top 40 single of Spears's career and her fourth to chart on Billboard. In Canada, the song became her second to chart on the RPM Country Tracks survey, peaking at number 44. "Daddy, I Love You" was released on the studio album, With Love, Billie Jo Spears.

== Track listing ==
7" vinyl single

- "Daddy, I Love You" – 2:39
- "Look Out Your Window" – 2:39

== Charts ==
=== Weekly charts ===
Weekly chart performance for "Daddy, I Love You"
Chart (1969–1970)	Peak position
Canada Country Tracks (RPM)	44
US Hot Country Songs (Billboard)	40
