= Love Ain't Gonna Wait for Us =

Single by Billie Jo Spears

from the album Love Ain't Gonna Wait for Us
- B-side: "Say It Again"
- Released: October 1978
- Recorded: August 1978
- Studio: Jack Clement Recording Studio
- Genre: Country; Countrypolitan
- Label: United Artists
- Songwriters: Larry Butler; Ben Peters
- Producer: Larry Butler

Billie Jo Spears singles chronology
"'57 Chevrolet" (1978)	"Love Ain't Gonna Wait for Us" (1978)	"Yesterday" (1979)

"Love Ain't Gonna Wait for Us" is a song originally recorded by American country artist Billie Jo Spears. Written by Larry Butler and Ben Peters, the song was released as a single by United Artists Records in October 1978. It reached the top 30 of the American country chart later in the year and served as the title track for Spears's 1978 studio LP. It was given a positive review from Record World magazine.

== Background, recording, release and reception ==
Billie Jo Spears reached her commercial peak at United Artists Records during the 1970s. Among her most successful recordings was the number one single "Blanket on the Ground", the top ten single "What I've Got in Mind" and a series of top 20 singles through the decade. Several of Spears's singles also peaked outside the top 20, but still managed top 30 or top 40 positions. This included 1978's "Love Ain't Gonna Wait for Us". The track was composed by Larry Butler and Ben Peters. It was recorded in August 1978 at the Jack Clement Studio, located in Nashville, Tennessee. Larry Butler also served as the single's producer.

"Love Ain't Gonna Wait for Us" was released by United Artists Records as a single in October 1978. It was backed on the B-side by the track "Say It Again". The label issued it as a seven-inch vinyl disc. The single entered America's Billboard Hot Country Songs chart in November 1978. Spending three weeks on the chart, it climbed to the number 24 position by January 1978. It also reached number 47 on the Canadian RPM Country Tracks chart. Record World magazine gave the track a positive response in 1978: "Spears sings a quick-moving love song with a disco-like beat. The lyrics and sound do not stray too far from country, though, with steel' guitars, background vocals and Spears' solid vocals." It was then released and served as the title for Spears's 1978 studio album.

== Track listing ==
7" vinyl single

- "Love Ain't Gonna Wait for Us" – 2:52
- "Say It Again" – 3:13

== Charts ==
Weekly chart performance for "Love Ain't Gonna Wait for Us"
Chart (1978–1979)	Peak position
Canada Country Tracks (RPM)	47
US Hot Country Songs (Billboard)	24
