= Standing Tall (song) =

1978 song by Tammy Wynette

Song by Tammy Wynette

from the album Womanhood
- Released: July 1978
- Recorded: April 1978
- Genre: Countrypolitan
- Length: 3:03
- Label: Epic
- Songwriters: Larry Butler; Ben Peters
- Producer: Billy Sherrill

"Standing Tall" is a song co-written by Larry Butler and Ben Peters. It was originally recorded by American country music artist Tammy Wynette on her 1978 album Womanhood. One of its most notable versions is a version recorded by Billie Jo Spears shortly afterward. It was first cut for Spears's 1978 album and was re-recorded and released as a single in 1980. Spears's second version reached the top 20 of the American country chart and the top ten of the Canadian country chart. "Standing Tall" would later be re-recorded by several artists, notably Lorrie Morgan, who released her version as a single in 1995.

== Tammy Wynette version ==
Tammy Wynette was considered one of country music's most successful artists during the sixties and seventies. She had a string of number one and top ten singles that continued into the early eighties decade. Among her late seventies studio albums was 1978's Womanhood. Of its ten songs was the Larry Butler and Ben Peters composition "Standing Tall". Wynette recorded the song in April 1978, which was three months prior to the recording by Billie Jo Spears. Wynette's version of "Standing Tall" was produced by Billy Sherrill. The song appeared as an album track on Womanhood when the disc was released in July 1978.

== Billie Jo Spears version ==
"Standing Tall"

Single by Billie Jo Spears

from the album Standing Tall
- B-side: "Freedom Song"
- Released: February 1980
- Recorded: August 1978 (Album version); July 1979 (Single version)
- Studio: Jack Clement Recording Studio
- Genre: Country
- Label: United Artists
- Songwriters: Larry Butler; Ben Peters
- Producer: Larry Butler

Billie Jo Spears singles chronology
| "Rainy Days and Stormy Nights" (1979) | "Standing Tall" (1980) | "Natural Attraction" (1980) |

=== Background, content recording ===
Billie Jo Spears was at the height of her career recording for United Artists Records in the seventies and early eighties. She topped the country charts with 1975's "Blanket on the Ground" and had three additional top ten singles. A series of songs reached the country top 20 during this period as well. Among her chart singles was 1980's "Standing Tall". The song was co-written by Ben Peters and Larry Butler. In a 1980 interview, Butler explained that he spent more time as a record producer than a songwriter. However, he found the time to pen "Standing Tall".

Spears had been known for recording songs that had themes about female survivors and women asserting themselves. "Standing Tall" described a woman who chooses to walk away from a failed relationship. She first recorded the track in August 1978 for her studio album that year titled Love Ain't Gonna Wait for Us. When it was decided the song would be released as a single, it was re-recorded one year later in July 1979. Specifically, it was cut at the Jack Clement Recording Studio in Nashville, Tennessee. The session was also produced by Larry Butler.

=== Release, chart performance and critical reception ===
The re-recorded version of "Standing Tall" was released in February 1980 by United Artists Records. It was backed on the B-side by the track "Freedom Song". It was distributed as a seven-inch vinyl disc. The single entered America's Billboard Hot Country Songs chart in February 1980. It spent a total of 13 weeks on the chart and the reached the top 20, peaking at number 15 in April 1980. It was among Spears's final top 20 singles in her career. On Canada's RPM Country Tracks chart, the song reached the top ten, climbing to number nine. It was Spears's final top ten single (and final charting single) in Canada.

It served as the title track for Spears's 1980 album of the same name. "Standing Tall" was given a positive review by Record World magazine, who named it the "Country Song of the Week" in February 1980. "Spears has picked a choice tune here and given it a light touch. The sound is easy and soothing to create a pleasant, understated mood," critics said.

=== Track listing ===
7" vinyl single

- "Standing Tall" – 3:06
- "Freedom Song" – 2:45

=== Charts ===
Weekly chart performance for "Standing Tall"
| Chart (1980) | Peak position |
|---|---|
| Canada Country Tracks (RPM) | 9 |
| US Hot Country Songs (Billboard) | 15 |

== Other versions ==
"Standing Tall" has been recorded by other artists in the country genre. In 1978, it was cut by Charlie Rich for his studio LP The Fool Strikes Again. Australian country performer Reg Lindsay cut "Standing Tall" and titled his 1979 album after the track. In 1991, it was recorded by Brenda Lee for her eponymous album released on Warner Bros. Records.

=== Lorrie Morgan version ===
"Standing Tall"

Single by Lorrie Morgan

from the album Reflections: Greatest Hits
- Released: September 1995
- Genre: Country
- Length: 3:03
- Label: BNA
- Songwriters: Larry Butler; Ben Peters
- Producer: James Stroud

Lorrie Morgan singles chronology
| "Back in Your Arms Again" (1995) | "Standing Tall" (1995) | "Sleigh Ride" (1995) |

"Standing Tall" was notably recorded by Lorrie Morgan for her 1995 compilation album Reflections: Greatest Hits. Morgan had been among country music's most commercially-successful recording artists during the 1990s. A string of her singles reached the country chart top ten, including three number one singles. Morgan had been a fan of classic country music and knew many of Spears's songs that displayed assertive female characters. This inspired Morgan to record "Standing Tall" as one of the new songs featured on the compilation. Morgan herself described the song as an "anthem for women" in an interview with the Chicago Tribune. The track was produced by James Stroud.

Lorrie Morgan's version of "Standing Tall" was released in September 1995 as a single via BNA Records. It was distributed as both a compact disc and a cassette in its single version. The song debuted at number 73 on the American Billboard Hot Country Songs chart in December 1995. At the time of its release, Billboard magazine received a series of phone calls from people who recognized the song but could not recall who first recorded it prior to Morgan. In total, it spent 17 weeks on the chart, peaking at number 32 in March 1996. It reached a similar position on the Canadian RPM Country Tracks chart, rising to number 38.

==== Track listing ====
CD single; Cassette single (repeats three times)

- "Standing Tall" – 3:01
- "Standing Tall" – 3:01
- "Standing Tall" – 3:01

==== Charts ====
Weekly chart performance for "Standing Tall"
| Chart (1995–1996) | Peak position |
|---|---|
| Canada Country Tracks (RPM) | 38 |
| US Hot Country Songs (Billboard) | 32 |
