= I'm Not Easy (album) =

Studio album by Billie Jo Spears
- Released: November 1976
- Recorded: July 1976
- Studio: Jack Clement Recording Studio
- Genre: Country
- Label: United Artists
- Producer: Larry Butler

Billie Jo Spears chronology
By Request: Del and Billie Jo (1976)	I'm Not Easy (1976)	If You Want Me (1977)

Singles from I'm Not Easy
- 1. "Never Did Like Whiskey" Released: October 1976; 2. "I'm Not Easy" Released: January 1977

I'm Not Easy is a studio album by American country artist Billie Jo Spears. It was released in November 1976 via United Artists Records and contained 11 tracks. The disc featured many ballads, along with some uptempo tracks. Of its tracks, two singles were spawned: "Never Did Like Whiskey" and the title track. Both reached top 20 positions on the American country charts between 1976 and 1977. The disc itself charted on the American country albums chart and received mainly positive reviews from music publications.

== Background, recording and content ==
Billie Jo Spears first had success with 1969's "Mr. Walker, It's All Over", but really broke through in 1975 with the chart-topping "Blanket on the Ground". The song set forth a series of top ten and top 20 singles that Spears had through 1980. The United Artists label would also issue a series of studio albums of Spears's material during the decade, including 1976's I'm Not Easy. The project was recorded in July 1976 at the Jack Clement Recording Studio in Nashville, Tennessee. Sessions were produced by Larry Butler.

I'm Not Easy consisted of 11 tracks. Several songs on the project were both ballads and cover tunes. This included Elvis Presley's "Heartbreak Hotel" and two Dottie West covers: "Here Comes My Baby Back Again" and "Every Word I Write". Also featured are covers of Barbara Mandrell's single "That's What Friends Are For" and a song that first appeared on an album by Tammy Wynette titled "Too Far Gone". Original songs on the project included the title track, "Never Did Like Whiskey", "No Other Man" and "Is I Love You That Easy to Say".

== Release and critical reception ==
Professional ratings
Review scores
Source	Rating
AllMusic	4/5 stars

I'm Not Easy was released by United Artists Records in October 1976. It was originally distributed as a vinyl LP with five songs on each side of the disc. It was the eleventh studio album of Spears's career. The album received mostly positive reviews from critics and music publications. Billboard commented that "Spears scores an impressive performance" with each track. They also praised the album's production: "Each selection is tackled in a fresh, powerful and heartfelt manner." Cashbox positively commented, "Billie Jo makes each her own distinctive, message, with production by Larry Butler."

AllMusic's Greg Adams concluded that "a lot of big names contributed to this album in one way or another, but in the end it is the performances of Spears that elevate I'm Not Easy above the fray." Alan Cackett of Country Music People magazine gave the project a less favorable review in 1978: "Containing as it did three hit singles, you would think that this would have been a great album, but it featured disappointingly poor versions of songs made famous by others."

== Chart performance and singles ==
I'm Not Easy debuted on America's Billboard Top Country Albums chart in December 1976. It spent a total of 13 weeks on the chart, climbing to the number 36 position in January 1977. It was among Spears's final top 40 chart entries on the Country Albums survey. Two singles were spawned from I'm Not Easy. The first was "Never Did Like Whiskey", which United Artists first issued in October 1976. It reached the top 20 of the American Billboard Hot Country Songs chart, peaking at number 18. On Canada's RPM Country Tracks chart, it reached number 28. The title track was then spawned as the second single in January 1977. It later reached number 11 on the Billboard country chart and number 29 on the RPM Country Tracks chart.

== Track listing ==
Side one
No.	Title	Writer(s)	Length
1.	"Never Did Like Whiskey"	K. O'Dell	2:08
2.	"Is I Love You That Easy to Say"	B. Taylor; S. Kesler	3:43
3.	"Too Far Gone"	B. Sherrill	3:15
4.	"Heartbreak Hotel"	M. Axton; T. Durden; E. Presley	3:12
5.	"Here Comes Those Lies Again"	L. Butler; M. David	3:20

Side two
No.	Title	Writer(s)	Length
1.	"I'm Not Easy"	D. Chamberlain; J. Vest	3:03
2.	"Seeing Is Believing"	G. Martin	2:38
3.	"Here Comes My Baby Back Again"	B. West; D. West	2:15
4.	"Every Word I Write"	R. Bowling; J. Crutchfield; G. Richey	2:55
5.	"That's What Friends Are For"	R. Parsons; E. Penney	2:39
6.	"No Other Man"	I. Mesler; R. Mainegra	2:33

== Personnel ==
All credits are adapted from the liner notes of I'm Not Easy.

Musical personnel

- Tommy Allsup – Bass guitar
- Byron Bach – Strings
- Brenton Banks – Strings
- George Binkley III – Strings
- Larry Butler – Keyboards
- Jimmy Capps – Guitar
- Jerry Carrigan – Drums
- Marvin Chantry – Strings
- Roy Christensen – Strings
- Jimmy Colvard – Guitar
- Pete Drake – Steel guitar
- Jack Eubanks – Guitar
- Carl Gorodetzky – Strings
- Sheldon Kurland – Strings
- Bob Moore – Bass
- George Richey – Keyboards
- Hargus "Pig" Robbins – Keyboards
- Billy Sanford – Guitar
- Pam Sixfin – Strings
- Steven Smith – Strings
- Billie Jo Spears – Lead vocals
- Gary Vanosdale – Strings
- Pete Wade – Guitar

Technical personnel

- Larry Butler – Producer
- Bill Burks – Design
- Bill Justis – String arrangement
- The Jordanaires – Background vocals
- Ria Lewerke – Art direction
- Carol Montgomery – Background vocals
- Gary Regester – Photography
- Billy Sherrill – Engineer
- Bob Sowell – Mastering

== Chart performance ==
Chart (1976–1977)	Peak position
US Top Country Albums (Billboard)	36

== Release history ==
Region	Date	Format	Label	Ref.
Germany	November 1976	Vinyl LP	United Artists Records	
Japan	November 1976	Vinyl LP	Liberty Records	
Netherlands	November 1976	Vinyl LP	United Artists Records	
North America	November 1976	Vinyl LP	United Artists Records	
