= Apartment No. 9 =

1966 song by Bobby Austin and Johnny Paycheck

"Apartment #9"

Single by Bobby Austin

from the album Apartment #9
- B-side: "Gone Home to Mama"
- Released: 1966
- Recorded: 1966
- Genre: Country
- Length: 2:27
- Label: Capitol
- Songwriter(s): Bobby Austin; Johnny Paycheck
- Producer(s): Fuzzy Owen

Bobby Austin singles chronology
"Heaven, Heartache, Go Away" (1963)	"Apartment #9" (1966)	"Cupid's Last Arrow" (1967)

"Apartment No. 9" (also referred to as "Apartment #9") is a song written by Bobby Austin and Johnny Paycheck. It was originally recorded by American country musician Bobby Austin in 1966 and became a top 40 hit on the Billboard country songs chart.

It was recorded soon after by American country artist Tammy Wynette who also had minor success on the country songs survey. Although not the original version, Wynette's cover of "Apartment No. 9" is considered one of her most significant and signature songs of her career.

"Apartment No. 9" would be the first song to win the "Song of the Year" accolade at the Academy of Country Music Awards in 1966.

== Bobby Austin version ==
The song was originally recorded by Bobby Austin in 1966 under the title "Apartment #9". The track was originally produced by Fuzzy Owen (one of the song's co-writers) under the Tally recording label. When promoted as a single, it was licensed to Capitol Records.

The song was issued as a single in 1966 and it became Austin's first to chart on the Billboard Hot Country Singles chart, reaching number 21 in 1966. "Apartment #9" would be one of several charting singles by Austin over the next several years. Future charting singles included "Cupid's Last Arrow" (1967) and "This Song Is Just for You" (1967). Austin's version of the song was issued on his debut studio album in 1967 also called Apartment No. 9.

=== Track listings ===
7" vinyl single

- "Apartment #9" – 2:27
- "Gone Home to Mama" – 2:36

=== Charts ===
Chart (1966)	Peak position
US Hot Country Singles (Billboard)	21

== Tammy Wynette version ==
"Apartment No. 9"

Single by Tammy Wynette

from the album Your Good Girl's Gonna Go Bad
- B-side: "I'm Not Mine to Give"
- Released: October 1966
- Recorded: 1966
- Studio: Columbia (Nashville, Tennessee)
- Genre: Country
- Length: 2:54
- Label: Epic
- Songwriter(s): Fern Foley; Fuzzy Owen; Johnny Paycheck
- Producer(s): Billy Sherrill

Tammy Wynette singles chronology
"Apartment No. 9" (1966)	"Your Good Girl's Gonna Go Bad" (1967)

"Apartment No. 9" was notably covered by Tammy Wynette, also in 1966. The song was the first of Wynette's to be professionally recorded. Upon arriving to Nashville, Tennessee in 1965, Wynette began pitching songs to various record labels. When meeting Epic Records producer Billy Sherrill, he agreed to produce Wynette if she could find quality songs to record. Wynette returned with Bobby Austin's version of "Apartment No. 9". "Apartment No. 9" was recorded by Sherrill in September 1966 at the Columbia Recording Studios in Nashville. Other tracks recorded during this time would later appear on Wynette's debut studio album.

Wynette's version of "Apartment No. 9" was issued as a single in October 1966. The song also became a minor hit on the Billboard Hot Country Singles chart, only reaching number 44. The song would later be released on Wynette's debut studio album, Your Good Girl's Gonna Go Bad (1967).

Although not a major hit, Tammy Wynette's version of "Apartment No. 9" is considered to be one of her most notable recordings. Taste of Country rated it among their list of the "Top 10 Tammy Wynette Songs". It was included among CMT's list of the "Ten Essential Tammy Wynette Songs." Stephen Cook of Allmusic called "Apartment No. 9" a "quality gem".

=== Track listings ===
7" vinyl single

- "Apartment No. 9" – 2:54
- "I'm Not Mine to Give" – 2:14

=== Charts ===
Chart (1966)	Peak position
US Hot Country Singles (Billboard)	44
