= '57 Chevrolet (song) =

Single by Billie Jo Spears

from the album Lonely Hearts Club
- B-side: "The Lovin' Kind"
- Released: July 1978
- Recorded: August 1977
- Studio: Jack Clement Recording (Nashville, Tennessee)
- Genre: Country; Countrypolitan
- Label: United Artists
- Songwriter(s): Roger Bowling
- Producer(s): Larry Butler

Billie Jo Spears singles chronology
"I've Got to Go" (1978)	"'57 Chevrolet" (1978)	"Love Ain't Gonna Wait for Us" (1978)

"'57 Chevrolet" is a song written by Roger Bowling that was originally recorded by American country artist Billie Jo Spears. It was released as a single by United Artists Records in 1978 and reached the top 20 of the American and Canadian country songs charts. It was also included on Spears's 1978 studio album titled Lonely Hearts Club. It was reviewed positively by critics following its release.

== Background, content and recording ==
Billie Jo Spears was at her career peak during the mid and late seventies at United Artists Records. She reached the top of the charts with 1975's "Blanket on the Ground" and the top ten with 1976's "What I've Got in Mind" and "Misty Blue". Through 1981, she had a series of top 20 singles on the country charts as well, including "'57 Chevrolet". Spears became known for recording songs that discussed themes about rekindling romance in marriages (a theme that was found on "Blanket on the Ground") and "'57 Chevrolet" was among these recordings.

"'57 Chevrolet"'s main character recalls when her relationship was new and the memories made with her partner in their 1957 Chevrolet automobile. The song was written by Roger Bowling, who also wrote Spears's "Blanket on the Ground". The track was recording at the Jack Clement Recording in Nashville, Tennessee in August 1978. The session was produced by Larry Butler.

== Release, reception and chart performance ==
"'57 Chevrolet" was first included as an album track on Spears's studio LP titled Lonely Hearts Club. The album was released in February 1978. It was spawned as the third and final single from the LP in July 1978 by United Artists Records. It was distributed as a seven-inch vinyl disc and was backed on the B-side by the song, "The Lovin' Kind". Cash Box magazine compared the song Spears's "Blanket on the Ground" in their review: "Producer Larry Butler and vocalist Billie Jo Spears fall back on the melody and lyrical content which made "Blanket On The Ground" a huge success a few years ago. Music Directors, Coin Operators and Distributors who had good activity on "Blanket" should especially act on this cut."

"'57 Chevrolet" debuted on America's Billboard Hot Country Songs chart in August 1978. It spent a total of 12 weeks on the chart, peaking at the number 16 position in October 1978. On the Canadian RPM Country Tracks chart, the song peaked at number 12 position.

== Track listing ==
7" vinyl single

- "'57 Chevrolet" – 2:48
- "The Lovin' Kind" – 3:35

== Charts ==
Weekly chart performance for "'57 Chevrolet"
Chart (1978)	Peak position
Canada Country Tracks (RPM)	12
US Hot Country Songs (Billboard)	16
