= I've Got to Go =

Single by Billie Jo Spears

from the album Lonely Hearts Club
- B-side: "There's More To A Tear (That Meets The Eye)"
- Released: March 1978
- Recorded: August 1977
- Studio: Jack Clement Recording Studio
- Genre: Country
- Label: United Artists
- Songwriter(s): Roger Bowling; Larry Butler
- Producer(s): Larry Butler

Billie Jo Spears singles chronology
"Lonely Hearts Club" (1977)	"I've Got to Go" (1978)	"'57 Chevrolet" (1978)

"I've Got to Go" is a song originally recorded by American country artist Billie Jo Spears. It was written by Roger Bowling and Larry Butler. Released as a single in 1978 by United Artists Records, the song reached the top 20 of the American country chart and the top 30 of the Canadian country chart. It was spawned from Spears's 1978 studio album titled Lonely Hearts Club.

== Background and recording ==
Billie Jo Spears reached her commercial peak during the mid and late 1970s at United Artists Records. She topped the country charts with 1975's "Blanket on the Ground" and had three more singles reach the top ten. She also had a string of singles reach the top 20 of the country charts. Among these singles was 1978's "I've Got to Go". The song was co-written by Roger Bowling and Larry Butler. Butler also served as the song's record producer. The track was recorded in August 1977 at the Jack Clement Recording Studio in Nashville, Tennessee.

== Release and chart performance ==
"I've Got to Go" was first released on Spears's studio album Lonely Hearts Club in February 1978. It was then issued as a single by United Artists Records in March 1978. It was issued as a seven-inch vinyl disc and was backed on the B-side by the track, "There's More to a Tear (Than Meets the Eye)". It debuted on the American Billboard Hot Country Songs chart in April 1978. Spending a total of 12 weeks, it climbed to number 17 position in June 1978. It also reached number 26 on the Canadian RPM Country Tracks chart around the same time.

== Track listing ==
7" vinyl single

- "I've Got to Go" – 2:37
- "There's More To A Tear (That Meets The Eye)" – 2:48

== Charts ==
Weekly chart performance for "I've Got to Go"
Chart (1978)	Peak position
Canada Country Tracks (RPM)	26
US Hot Country Songs (Billboard)	17
