= What I've Got in Mind (album) =

Studio album by Billie Jo Spears
- Released: June 1976
- Recorded: January 1976
- Studio: Jack Clement Recording Studio
- Genre: Country
- Label: United Artists
- Producer: Larry Butler

Billie Jo Spears chronology
Billie Jo (1975)	What I've Got in Mind (1976)	By Request: Del and Billie Jo (1976)

Singles from What I've Got in Mind
- 1. "What I've Got in Mind" Released: February 1976; 2. "Misty Blue" Released: May 1976; 3. "Sing Me an Old Fashioned Song" Released: October 1976

What I've Got in Mind is a studio album by American country artist Billie Jo Spears. It was released in June 1976 via United Artists Records and was the ninth studio album of her career. The disc contained a total of ten tracks, mixing both original recordings with cover tunes. Among its tracks were three singles: the title track, "Misty Blue" and "Sing Me an Old Fashioned Song". Both the title song and "Misty Blue" reached the top five of the North American country charts. "Sing Me an Old Fashioned Song" was released overseas where it made chart positions internationally. The album itself reached the top ten on the American country albums chart and the top 50 of the UK Albums chart. Country Music People gave the disc a positive review.

== Background and recording ==
Billie Jo Spears made a successful comeback in 1975 with the single "Blanket on the Ground". The song topped the country charts and was an international pop success. The song set forth a string of top ten and top 20 American country singles that embedded elements of country pop. Many of these songs also crossed over onto the British and Irish pop charts, including the 1976 single "What I've Got in Mind". The success of the track set forth an album of the same name. The album was recorded in January 1976 at the Jack Clement Recording Studio located in Nashville, Tennessee. The sessions were produced by Larry Butler and the strings were arranged by Bill Justis.

== Content ==
What I've Got in Mind was a collection of ten tracks. Its tracks mixed both uptempo material with ballads that ranged in variety. Of its uptempo tunes was "Sing Me an Old Fashioned Song" while in comparison was the ballad, "Misty Blue". The latter had previously become a pop and R&B success for Dorothy Moore The project also included covers of pop and country singles of the era: Aretha Franklin's "Do Right Woman, Do Right Man", Olivia Newton-John's "Let It Shine" and Roger Miller's "Husbands and Wives". New material on the project included two songs co-written by Larry Butler: "Let's Try to Wake It Up Again" and "Love Let Me Down". Other new songs included the title track and "Loving You Was All I Ever Needed".

== Release and critical reception ==
What I've Got in Mind was released in June 1976 by United Artists Records. It was the ninth studio album in Spears's career and the third with United Artists. The label originally issued it as a vinyl LP, with five songs on each side of the record. A similar track listing appeared as a cassette the same year. The album received a positive response from critics. Billboard magazine named it among its "Top Album Picks" in June 1976. Reviewers found the album to be "more sophisticated instrumentally than any of her previous efforts" while also demonstrating a "good balance" of uptempo songs and ballads. In 1978, Alan Cackett of Country Music People found the disc to have "brought her back strongly to both country music and credibility." He included on Spears's vocal performance: "inevitably Billie Jo sings her heart out all the way and there were more than enough goodies to make it another must for the lady’s many fans."

== Chart performance and singles ==
What I've Got in Mind debuted on America's Billboard Top Country Albums chart in late June 1976. It spent a total of 17 weeks on the chart and climbed to the number seven position in August 1976. It was one of two albums in her career to reach the top ten of the Billboard country albums survey. It entered the UK Albums Chart in November 1976. Spending two weeks there, it climbed to the number 46 position. It was one of three albums to reach the UK Albums survey. It became a best-selling album in the United Kingdom, with 60,000 units sold, helping it to receive a silver certification from the British Phonographic Industry.

Three singles were included on What I've Got in Mind. The title track was the first single issued from the project. It was first released by United Artists Records in February 1976, reaching the top five of Billboard Hot Country Songs and RPM Country Tracks charts (both in North America). It also reached the top ten of the UK Singles Chart and the Irish Singles Chart. "Misty Blue" was released in May 1976 as the second single from the intended album. It also reached the top five of the North American country charts. "Sing Me an Old Fashioned Song" was the final single from the disc and was released outside North America in October 1976. It reached the top 40 in the United Kingdom and the top ten in Ireland.

== Track listing ==
Side one (LP and cassette)
No.	Title	Writer(s)	Length
1.	"What I've Got in Mind"	K. O'Dell	2:42
2.	"Like a Sunflower"	M. A. Leikin; G. Sklerov	2:40
3.	"Misty Blue"	B. Montgomery	2:35
4.	"Let It Shine"	L. Hargrove	3:13
5.	"Let's Try to Wake It Up Again"	L. Butler; B. Peters	2:28

Side two (LP and cassette)
No.	Title	Writer(s)	Length
1.	"Do Right Woman, Do Right Man"	C. Moman; D. Penn	2:32
2.	"Loving You Was All I Ever Needed"	S. Kesler; B. Wood	2:52
3.	"Sing Me an Old Fashioned Song"	L. Henley; J. Slate	3:36
4.	"Love Let Me Down"	R. Bowling; L. Butler	3:33
5.	"Husbands and Wives"	R. Miller	3:14

== Personnel ==
All credits are adapted from the liner notes of What I've Got in Mind.

Musical personnel

- Tommy Allsup – Bass guitar
- Jimmy Capps – Guitar
- Pete Drake – Steel guitar
- Buddy Harman – Drums
- Kenny Malone – Drums
- Bob Moore – Bass
- Hargus "Pig" Robbins – Piano
- Billy Sanford – Guitar
- Jerry Shook – Guitar
- Billie Jo Spears – Lead vocals

Technical personnel

- Larry Butler – Producer
- Bill Justis – String arrangement
- The Jordanaires – Background vocals
- George Richey – Special thanks
- Billy Sherrill – Engineer

== Chart performance ==
Chart (1976)	Peak position
UK Albums (Official Charts)	46
US Top Country Albums (Billboard)	7

== Certifications ==
Region	Certification	Certified units/sales
United Kingdom (BPI)	Silver	60,000^{^}
^{^} Shipments figures based on certification alone.

== Release history ==
Region	Date	Format	Label	Ref.
Australia	June 1976	Vinyl LP	Festival Records; United Artists Records	
Germany	June 1976	Vinyl LP	United Artists Records	
Netherlands	June 1976	Vinyl LP	United Artists Records	
North America	June 1976	Vinyl LP	United Artists Records	
United Kingdom	June 1976	Vinyl; cassette	United Artists Records	
