= Your Good Girl's Gonna Go Bad =

Studio album by Tammy Wynette
- Released: May 1967
- Recorded: September 1966 – January 1967
- Studio: Columbia (Nashville, Tennessee)
- Genre: Country
- Label: Epic
- Producer: Billy Sherrill

Tammy Wynette chronology
Your Good Girl's Gonna Go Bad (1967)	My Elusive Dreams (1968)

Singles from Your Good Girl's Gonna Go Bad
- 1. "Apartment No. 9" Released: October 1966; 2. "Your Good Girl's Gonna Go Bad" Released: February 1967

Your Good Girl's Gonna Go Bad is the debut studio album by American country artist Tammy Wynette. It was released in May 1967 and contained ten tracks. The majority of the album was a collection of cover tunes Wynette recorded, including songs by George Jones, Loretta Lynn and Jeannie Seely. Several new songs were also part of the project. It was the debut studio album of Wynette's career and included two singles: "Apartment No. 9" and "Your Good Girl's Gonna Go Bad". The latter became Wynette's first chart success, climbing into the top five of the American country chart. The album itself reached the American country LP's chart in 1967. The album later received a positive review from AllMusic, which gave it a five-star rating.

== Background, recording and content ==
In 1965, Tammy Wynette moved to Nashville, Tennessee with her three children in hopes of finding a recording contract. Second husband, Don Chapel, had attempted to secure his wife a recording contract but was turned down by the Decca, Hickory, Kapp and Musicor labels. As a last resort, a friend helped her schedule a meeting with a new producer named Billy Sherrill. Impressed by her talents, he signed her to Epic Records in 1966. With Sherrill serving as her producer, the pair began recording what came to be her debut studio album, which would later be titled Your Good Girl's Gonna Go Bad. The sessions began in September 1966 and were recorded at the Columbia Studios located in Nashville. The remainder of the album's sessions were complete in January 1967.

The album contained a total of ten tracks. Six of the album's songs were previously released singles by other country artists that Wynette covered: David Houston's "Almost Persuaded", Loretta Lynn's "Don't Come Home A-Drinkin' (With Lovin' on Your Mind)", Jeannie Seely's "Don't Touch Me", George Jones's "Walk Through This World with Me", Jack Greene's "There Goes My Everything" and Bobby Austin's "Apartment No. 9". Wynette also covered Dolly Parton's at-the-time unreleased track "I Wound Easy", originally recorded by Parton in 1966 but released in 1970 on Parton's compilation album, "As Long As I Love". Wynette's track however bears a different title, adding "(But I Heal Fast)" to the end of the title. Remaining tracks were original cuts, such as "Send Me No Roses", "I'm Not Mine to Give" and the Sherrill-Glenn Sutton-penned title track.

== Release, reception and singles ==
Professional ratings
Review scores
Source	Rating
Allmusic	5/5 stars

Your Good Girl's Gonna Go Bad was originally released by Epic Records in May 1967. It marked the debut studio album of Wynette's recording career. Epic distributed the album as a vinyl LP, containing five songs on each side. In 1995, it was re-released as a compact disc via Legacy Recordings and digitally years later. In its initial release, the album reached number seven on the American Billboard Country LP's chart. It was the first charting album in Wynette's career. The album was later reviewed by Stephen Cook of AllMusic who gave it a five-star rating. Cook noted that the album was "one of her best" and concluded that it was "one of the classic debuts in country music".

The project contained two singles. Its first single was Wynette's cover of "Apartment No. 9", which was issued by Epic in October 1966. With the release, "Apartment No. 9" became Wynette's debut and first charting single in her career. On the American Billboard Hot Country Songs chart, it climbed to the number 44 position. The second single included on the album was the title track, which Epic issued in February 1967. It became the breakout single in Wynette's career, reaching number three on the Billboard country songs chart in June 1967.

== Track listings ==
=== Vinyl version ===
Side one
No.	Title	Writer(s)	Length
1.	"Apartment No. 9"	Fern Foley; Charles "Fuzzy" Owen; Johnny Paycheck	2:54
2.	"Don't Come Home A-Drinkin' (With Lovin' on Your Mind)"	Loretta Lynn; Peggy Sue Wells	2:02
3.	"Don't Touch Me"	Hank Cochran	2:41
4.	"There Goes My Everything"	Dallas Frazier	2:37
5.	"Send Me No Roses"	Hank Mills	2:53

Side two
No.	Title	Writer(s)	Length
1.	"Your Good Girl's Gonna Go Bad"	Billy Sherrill; Glenn Sutton	2:00
2.	"Walk Through This World with Me"	Kay Savage; Sandra Seamons	2:40
3.	"I'm Not Mine to Give"	Fred Lehner	2:14
4.	"I Wound Easy (But I Heal Fast)"	Bill Owens	2:21
5.	"Almost Persuaded"	Sherrill; Sutton	2:55

=== Compact disc and digital versions ===
Your Good Girl's Gonna Go Bad
No.	Title	Writer(s)	Length
1.	"Apartment No. 9"	Foley; Owen; Paycheck	2:56
2.	"Don't Come Home A-Drinkin' (With Lovin' on Your Mind)"	Lynn; Wells	2:04
3.	"Don't Touch Me"	Cochran	2:43
4.	"There Goes My Everything"	Frazier	2:38
5.	"Send Me No Roses"	Mills	2:56
6.	"Your Good Girl's Gonna Go Bad"	Sherrill; Sutton	2:01
7.	"Walk Through This World with Me"	Savage; Seamons	2:42
8.	"I'm Not Mine to Give"	Lehner	2:14
9.	"I Wound Easy (But I Heal Fast)"	Owens	2:23
10.	"Almost Persuaded"	Sherrill; Sutton	2:57

== Chart performance ==
Chart (1967)	Peak position
US Top Country Albums (Billboard)	7

== Release history ==
Region	Date	Format	Label	Ref.
North America	May 1967	Vinyl	Columbia Records	
North America	February 7, 1995	Compact disc	Epic Records; Legacy Recordings	
North America	December 30, 2002	Cassette; compact disc	Sony Music	
North America	2010s	Download; streaming	Sony BMG	
