= Never Did Like Whiskey =

Single by Billie Jo Spears

from the album I'm Not Easy
- B-side: "No Other Man"
- Released: October 1976
- Recorded: July 1976
- Studio: Jack Clement Recording (Nashville, Tennessee)
- Genre: Country; Countrypolitan
- Length: 2:08
- Label: United Artists
- Songwriter(s): Kenny O'Dell
- Producer(s): Larry Butler

Billie Jo Spears singles chronology
"Sing Me an Old Fashioned Song" (1976)	"Never Did Like Whiskey" (1976)	"I'm Not Easy" (1976)

"Never Did Like Whiskey" is a song written by Kenny O'Dell that was originally recorded by American country artist Billie Jo Spears. It was released as a single in 1976 and reached the top 20 of the American country chart and the top 30 of the Canadian country chart. The song was included on Spears's 1976 studio album titled I'm Not Easy.

== Background and recording ==
After signing with United Artists Records, Billie Jo Spears topped the country charts in 1975 with "Blanket on the Ground". During the seventies, she had a series of top ten and top 20 singles on the country charts. Among her successful singles of this period was "Never Did Like Whiskey". Composed by Kenny O'Dell, "Never Did Like Whiskey" was produced by Larry Butler in July 1976 at the Jack Clement Recording Studio in Nashville, Tennessee.

== Release, chart performance and reception ==
"Never Did Like Whiskey" was released as a single in October 1976 on United Artists Records. It was backed on the B-side by the song "No Other Man". It was distributed as a seven-inch vinyl disc. It debuted on the American Billboard Hot Country Songs chart in October 1976. Spending 12 weeks there, it peaked at the number 18 position by December 1976. On the Canadian RPM Country Tracks chart, the song reached the number 28 position. Later that year, "Never Did Like Whiskey" was featured on Spears's studio album I'm Not Easy.

In reviewing the I'm Not Easy LP, AllMusic's Greg Adams positively remarked that "Never Did Like Whiskey" was "one of Spears' best cuts, a modern and commercial update of honky tonk music that should have been a much bigger hit than it was." Kurt Wolff of Country Music: The Rough Guide called the song as "bold and carefree".

== Track listing ==
7" vinyl single

- "Never Did Like Whiskey" – 2:08
- "No Other Man" – 2:33

== Charts ==
Weekly chart performance for "Never Did Like Whiskey"
Chart (1976)	Peak position
Canada Country Tracks (RPM)	28
US Hot Country Songs (Billboard)	18
