= Two Separate Bar Stools =

Single by Wanda Jackson

from the album Wanda Jackson Country
- B-side: "Two Wrongs Don't Make A Right"
- Released: December 1969
- Recorded: March 29, 1969; Nashville, Tennessee, U.S
- Genre: Country
- Label: Capitol
- Songwriter(s): Bill Graham
- Producer(s): Kelso Herston

Wanda Jackson singles chronology
"My Big Iron Skillet" (1969)	"Two Separate Bar Stools" (1969)	"A Woman Lives for Love" (1970)

"Two Separate Bar Stools" is a song written by Bill Graham. It was recorded and released as a single by American country, rock, and Christian artist, Wanda Jackson.

The song was recorded at the Columbia Recording Studio on March 29, 1969 in Nashville, Tennessee, United States. "Two Separate Bar Stools" was officially released as a single in December 1969, peaking at number thirty five on the Billboard Magazine Hot Country Singles chart. The song was issued on Jackson's 1970 studio album, Wanda Jackson Country.

== Chart performance ==
Chart (1969)	Peak position
U.S. Billboard Hot Country Singles	35
Canadian RPM Country Tracks	41
