= Sing Me an Old Fashioned Song =

Single by Billie Jo Spears

from the album What I've Got in Mind
- B-side: "Let's Try to Wake It Up Again"
- Released: October 1976
- Recorded: February 1976
- Studio: Jack Clement Recording (Nashville, Tennessee)
- Genre: Country; country pop
- Length: 3:36
- Label: United Artists
- Songwriter(s): Larry Henley; Johnny Slate
- Producer(s): Larry Butler

Billie Jo Spears singles chronology
"Misty Blue" (1976)	"Sing Me an Old Fashioned Song" (1976)	"Never Did Like Whiskey" (1976)

"Sing Me an Old Fashioned Song" is a song originally recorded by American country artist, Billie Jo Spears. It was composed by Larry Henley and Johnny Slate. It was first issued as an album track on Spears's 1976 studio album What I've Got Mind. It was then spawned as the third single from the album that year. It was distributed outside of North America, where it reached charting positions in several countries.

== Background, recording and chart performance ==
Billie Jo Spears returned with the chart-topping "Blanket on the Ground" after a several-year hiatus. The song brought forward a series of successful top ten and top North American country singles during the 1970s decade. "Blanket on the Ground" also became a top ten pop success in the United Kingdom and other nations. Its success prompted a series of singles exclusively for the international market. Among them was "Sing Me an Old Fashioned Song". Penned by Larry Henley and Johnny Slate, the track was recorded at the Jack Clement Recording Studio in Nashville, Tennessee. The session was produced by Larry Butler.

"Sing Me an Old Fashioned Song" was first included as an album track on Spears's studio disc What I've Got in Mind. The album was released in June 1976. The song itself was released as a single by United Artists Records in October 1976 as a seven-inch vinyl disc. The single was issued outside of North America, specifically to the United Kingdom, Australia and New Zealand. On the B-side was the song "Let's Try to Wake It Up Again". It reached number 78 on Australia's Kent Music Report chart. The song spent a total of eight weeks on the UK Singles Chart, peaking at number 34 position in November 1976.

== Track listing ==
7" vinyl single

- "Sing Me an Old Fashioned Song" – 3:36
- "Let's Try to Wake It Up Again" – 2:28

== Charts ==
Weekly chart performance for "Sing Me an Old Fashioned Song"
Chart (1976)	Peak position
Australia (Kent Music Report)	78
Ireland (IRMA)	9
UK Singles (OCC)	34
