= If You Want Me (song) =

Single by Billie Jo Spears

from the album If You Want Me
- B-side: "Don't Ever Let Go of Me" (North America) "Here Comes Those Lies Again" (international)
- Released: April 1977
- Recorded: January 1977
- Studio: Jack Clement Recording (Nashville, Tennessee)
- Genre: Country; Countrypolitan
- Length: 2:22
- Label: United Artists
- Songwriter(s): Ben Peters
- Producer(s): Larry Butler

Billie Jo Spears singles chronology
"I'm Not Easy" (1977)	"If You Want Me" (1977)	"Too Much Is Not Enough" (1977)

"If You Want Me" is a song written by Ben Peters that was originally recorded by American country artist Billie Jo Spears. It was released as a single in 1977 and reached the top ten of the American country chart, among other positions. It was the lead single of Spears's 1977 album of the same name. It was the final top ten single of Spears's career.

== Background and recording ==
Although Billie Jo Spears had her first commercial success in 1969, she had sustained success at the United Artists label in the seventies with songs like "Blanket on the Ground", "What I've Got in Mind" and "Misty Blue". A series of top 20 singles would follow during the seventies decade at the label. Among them was the top ten single in 1977, "If You Want Me". It was composed by Ben Peters and recorded in January 1977 at the Jack Clement Recording Studio in Nashville, Tennessee.

== Release, chart performance and reception ==
"If You Want Me" was released as a single in October 1976 on United Artists Records. On the North American release, it was backed on the B-side by the song "Don't Ever Let Go of Me". On the international version, it was backed on the B-side by the song "Here Comes Those Lies Again". The latter was taken from Spears's 1977 studio album, I'm Not Easy. Both were distributed as seven-inch vinyl discs. It debuted on the American Billboard Hot Country Songs chart in May 1977. Spending a total of 13 weeks on the chart, it reached the number eight position in July 1977. It became her final top ten Billboard country single. On the Canadian RPM Country Tracks chart, the song reached the number 17 position. "If You Want Me" served as the title for Spears's studio album of the same name.

== Track listing ==
7" vinyl single (North America)

- "If You Want Me" – 2:22
- "Don't Ever Let Go of Me" – 2:33

7" vinyl single (International)

- "If You Want Me" – 2:22
- "Here Comes Those Lies Again" – 3:20

== Charts ==
Weekly chart performance for "If You Want Me"
Chart (1977)	Peak position
UK Breakers List (OCC)	52
Canada Country Tracks (RPM)	17
US Hot Country Songs (Billboard)	8
