= Bobby Austin (musician) =

American country music singer-songwriter (1933–2002)

- Born: Robert Allen Austin; May 4, 1933; Wenatchee, Washington, U.S.
- Died: January 6, 2002 (aged 68) Camas, Washington, U.S.
- Genre: Country
- Occupation: Musician
- Years active: 1955–2002
- Label: Capitol Records

Robert Allen Austin (May 4, 1933 – January 6, 2002) was an American country music singer-songwriter and musician.

Austin moved to Los Angeles in 1955, where he played bass in Wynn Stewart's band. He also worked as a session musician, for Buck Owens and Tommy Collins, among others, before being signed by Capitol Records as a solo artist in 1962. His "Apartment No. 9", written with Johnny Paycheck, was a hit for Tammy Wynette, in addition to reaching No. 21 on the U.S. country charts with his own version. He also co-wrote "Try a Little Kindness" which became a hit for Glen Campbell.

== Discography ==
- Apartment No. 9 (Capitol Records, 1967) U.S. Country No. 11
- Old Love Never Dies (Capitol, 1968)

=== Singles ===
Year	Single	US Country	Album
1966	"Apartment No. 9"	21	Apartment No. 9
1967	"Cupid's Last Arrow"	59	Apartment No. 9
1968	"This Song Is Just for You"	68	Old Love Never Dies
1970	"For Your Love"	65	Singles only
1972	"Knoxville Station"	39	Singles only
