= Your Good Girl's Gonna Go Bad (song) =

- European release picture sleeve

Single by Tammy Wynette

from the album Your Good Girl's Gonna Go Bad
- B-side: "Send Me No Roses"
- Released: February 1967
- Recorded: January 1967
- Studio: Columbia (Nashville, Tennessee)
- Genre: Country
- Length: 2:36
- Label: Epic
- Songwriter(s): Billy Sherrill; Glenn Sutton
- Producer(s): Billy Sherrill

Tammy Wynette singles chronology
"Apartment No. 9" (1966)	"Your Good Girl's Gonna Go Bad" (1967)	"My Elusive Dreams" (1967)

"Your Good Girl's Gonna Go Bad" is a song written by Billy Sherrill and Glenn Sutton, and recorded by American country music artist Tammy Wynette. It was released in February 1967 as the first single and title track from the album Your Good Girl's Gonna Go Bad.

== Background and reception ==
"Your Good Girl's Gonna Go Bad" was first recorded in January 1967 in the Columbia Recording Studio in Nashville, Tennessee. Seven additional tracks were recorded during this session, which would ultimately become part of Wynette's debut studio album. The session was produced by Billy Sherrill and the song was issued as Wynette's second single in February.

The song has been identified as one of Wynette's signature hit singles. Taste of Country named it one of their "Top 10 Tammy Wynette Songs" on their 2018 list, calling the song "strong feminine lyrics".

The song reached number 3 on the Billboard Hot Country Singles chart in 1967. It became Wynette's breakthrough hit as a recording artist and was released on her debut studio album of the same name.

A cover version by Billie Jo Spears, from her 1981 studio album Only the Hits, reached number 13 on the Billboard Hot Country Singles chart in 1981.

== Track listings ==
7" vinyl single

- "Your Good Girl's Gonna Go Bad"
- "Send Me No Roses"

== Charts ==
=== Weekly charts ===
==== Tammy Wynette ====
Chart (1967)	Peak position
US Hot Country Singles (Billboard)	3

==== Billie Jo Spears ====
Chart (1981)	Peak position
US Hot Country Singles (Billboard)	13
