= Roger Bowling (songwriter) =

American singer-songwriter

Roger Dale Bowling (December 3, 1944 – December 26, 1982) was an American songwriter who specialized in country music.

== Biography ==
Bowling was born in Helton, Leslie County, Kentucky.

As a recording artist, he placed seven singles on the Billboard country chart, all with songs he co-wrote. His highest-charting single as an artist was "Yellow Pages", which peaked at number 30 in 1981. He also performed the opening theme song "Heal It" (Byron Hill/Mike Reid), and the closing credits song "Friday Night Fool" (which he wrote) for the feature film The Exterminator (1980), on Embassy Pictures.

He committed suicide in Wiley, Georgia, at the age of 38, after being diagnosed with terminal cancer a year earlier.

== Work ==
His best-known songs include:

- "Blanket on the Ground" a number one hit for Billie Jo Spears in 1975
- "Lucille" (co-written with Hal Bynum), a number one hit for Kenny Rogers and named CMA Song Of The Year in 1977
- "Coward of the County" (co-written with Billy Edd Wheeler), a number one hit for Kenny Rogers in 1979
- "I'd Like To Sleep Til I Get Over You", a number five hit for Freddie Hart in 1975
- "Southern California" (co-written with George Richey and Billy Sherrill), a number five hit for George Jones and Tammy Wynette in 1977
- "'57 Chevrolet" in 1972
