= Misty Blue =

1967 single by Eddy Arnold

Single by Wilma Burgess

from the album Wilma Burgess Sings Misty Blue
- B-side: "Ain't Got No Man"
- Released: September 1966
- Recorded: March 24, 1966; Nashville, Tennessee, U.S.
- Genre: Country; Nashville Sound
- Length: 2:30
- Label: Decca
- Songwriter: Bob Montgomery
- Producer: Owen Bradley

Wilma Burgess singles chronology
"Don't Touch Me" (1966)	"Misty Blue" (1966)	"Fifteen Days" (1967)

"Misty Blue" is a song written by Bob Montgomery that has been recorded and made commercially successful by several music artists. Although Montgomery wrote the song for a different artist in mind, it was brought first to the attention of Wilma Burgess in 1966. It was recorded by Eddy Arnold the following year, both versions were top five country hits. A decade later, blues artist Dorothy Moore released the highest-charting version of the song and it reached the top ten in several different radio formats. Following Moore's revival of the track, numerous artists re-covered the tune, including country artist Billie Jo Spears. Spears's version would also go on to become a successful single release. Numerous other artists and musicians of different genres have recorded their own versions of "Misty Blue". The song is now considered both a country music and blues standard.

== Wilma Burgess original version ==
Bob Montgomery originally wrote the song for Brenda Lee, recalling, "I wrote 'Misty Blue' in about twenty minutes. It was a gift and it was perfect for Brenda Lee, but she turned it down. Her producer Owen Bradley loved the song and as he couldn’t push her to do it, he cut it country style with Wilma Burgess." Burgess recorded the song on March 24, 1966 at the Columbia Recording Studio in Nashville, Tennessee. "Misty Blue" was released in October 1966 and spent most of December 1966 and January–February 1967 in the top ten, peaking at number 4 on the Billboard Hot Country Singles chart. It ultimately became her highest-charting single. The song spawned the release of Burgess's second studio album Wilma Burgess Sings Misty Blue in 1967.

"Misty Blue" would ultimately become Burgess's signature song and would be re-recorded by her several times throughout her career. Paul Wadey of The Independent called Burgess's version of the song "soulful", noting that she was "an underrated song stylist who was at her best when handling romantic ballads."

=== Weekly charts ===
Chart (1966–67)	Peak position
US Hot Country Singles (Billboard)	4

=== Track listings ===
7" vinyl single

- "Misty Blue" – 2:30
- "Ain't Got No Man" – 2:29

== Eddy Arnold cover version ==
"Misty Blue"

Single by Eddy Arnold

from the album The Last Word in Lonesome
- B-side: "Calling Mary Names"
- Released: May 1967
- Recorded: April 20, 1966; Nashville, Tennessee, U.S.
- Genre: Country; Nashville Sound
- Length: 2:06
- Label: RCA Victor
- Songwriter: Bob Montgomery
- Producer: Chet Atkins

Eddy Arnold singles chronology
"Lonely Again" (1967)	"Misty Blue" (1967)	"Turn the World Around" (1967)

"Misty Blue" was made successful again by American country artist Eddy Arnold less than a year later. Arnold recorded his version of the track on April 20, 1966 with producer Chet Atkins. The song was released as a single in May 1967 and it became a major hit for Arnold. The song became even more successful than Wilma Burgess's original 1966 release. Arnold's "Misty Blue" peaked at number three on the Billboard Hot Country Singles chart, crossed over to number fifty-seven on the Hot 100 singles chart, and number thirteen on the adult contemporary chart. Arnold's 1967 release is the most successful cover version to be released by a male artist.

Arnold's version of "Misty Blue" appeared on his 1967 studio album with RCA Records entitled, The Last Word in Lonesome. Greg Adams of AllMusic called Arnold's version "pure MOR pop vocal material" and would later say, " Arnold's smooth crooning and Bill Walker's easy listening string arrangements are bound for the supper club."

=== Weekly charts ===
Chart (1967)	Peak position
Canada RPM Top Singles	41
US Hot 100 (Billboard)	57
US Adult Contemporary Tracks (Billboard)	13
US Hot Country Singles (Billboard)	3

=== Track listings ===
7" vinyl single

- "Misty Blue" – 2:06
- "Calling Mary Names" – 2:34

== Dorothy Moore cover version ==
"Misty Blue"
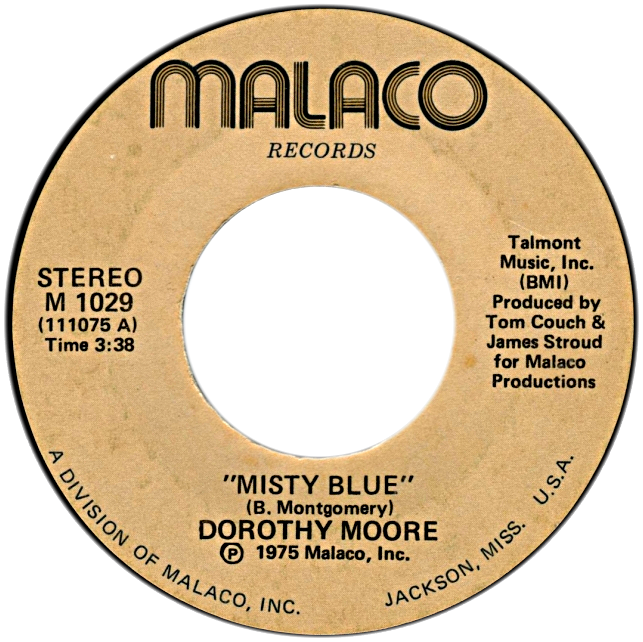

Single by Dorothy Moore

from the album Misty Blue
- A-side: "Here It Is"
- Released: November 1975
- Recorded: Malaco Studio 1973
- Genre: Deep soul; country
- Length: 3:38
- Label: Malaco
- Songwriter: Bob Montgomery
- Producers: James Stroud; Tom Couch

Dorothy Moore singles chronology
"Making Love (w/King Floyd)" (1975)	"Misty Blue" (1975)	"Funny How Time Slips Away" (1976)

Prior to Moore's blues version of "Misty Blue", fellow blues singer Joe Simon cut the song. Released in 1972, Simon's version of the song became a regional hit, hitting #1 on radio station CKLW (based in Windsor, Ontario, Canada, but with its primary market just across the border in Detroit.) Despite CKLW's reputation as a station that broke hit records, the track peaked at a lowly #91 on the US charts.

It was through the Joe Simon version that Malaco Records owner Tommy Couch was familiar with "Misty Blue" which Couch would record in 1973 with Dorothy Moore, a native of Jackson, MS who had recorded a number of tracks at the Malaco Studios in Jackson. Moore would recall receiving a morning call at her home from Couch inviting Moore to Couch's studio to hear a song he deemed perfect for her: (Dorothy Moore quote:)"I didn’t have a car at the time, so I took the bus to Malaco [where] I listened to the song [and] liked it...The rhythm section [was] there [so] we decided to record it. They had the lyrics typed out and [put] in front of me. And we did that record in one take. 'Misty Blue' was meant for me" - although Moore admits: "I recorded it just like I did any other. I didn’t say: 'This is a hit.' I never saw [great success] coming."

Evidently reluctant to release the track themselves, Malaco Records shopped Moore's "Misty Blue" to major labels without success, with the track remaining "in the can" until November 1975 when the cash-strapped Malaco Records used the last of its resources to press Moore's "Misty Blue" which they released themselves. When Moore was advised of her recording's belated release by Couch (Dorothy Moore quote:)"I [asked to] come in [to the studio] and add one thing to it. I had a copy of the recording [and had realized] the intro was too long - and [so] I put that 'mmmm-ooh-a-ooh' over the first few notes." Also Muscle Shoals Rhythm Section veteran Jimmy Johnson overdubbed his rhythm guitar work on to the 1973 track. Malaco Records did shop the updated track to Florida-based TK Records whose owner Henry Stone passed on releasing Moore's "Misty Blue" while agreeing for TK to act as national distributor for Malaco's own release of the track which Stone began promoting heavily via his own independent network.

After receiving its initial airplay in Chicago and Washington DC, Moore's single broke in the southern states in April 1976 and three months later it was nominated for a Grammy Award. In 1976 the single reached number 2 on the R&B chart and 3 on the Billboard Hot 100, as well as number 14 on the Adult Contemporary chart. Billboard ranked it as the No. 19 song for 1976.

"Misty Blue" was also a UK hit, reaching number 5 there on the chart dated for the week of 8 August 1976. Moore's single also achieved hit status in Australia (5), Canada (4), New Zealand (4), and South Africa (11).

=== Weekly charts ===
Chart (1975–1976)	Peak position
Australia (Kent Music Report)	5
Brazil	19
Canada RPM Top Singles	4
Canada RPM Adult Contemporary	7
New Zealand	4
South Africa	11
UK	5
US Billboard Hot 100	3
US Billboard Adult Contemporary	14
US Billboard R&B	2
US Cash Box Top 100	3

=== Year-end charts ===
Chart (1976)	Rank
Australia (Kent Music Report)	41
Canada	62
New Zealand	11
UK	40
US Billboard Hot 100	19
US Cash Box	18

=== Certifications ===
Certifications for "Misty Blue"
Region	Certification	Certified units/sales
Canada (Music Canada)	Gold	50,000^{^}
United Kingdom (BPI)	Silver	60,000^{^}
^{^} Shipments figures based on certification alone.

=== Other versions similar to Dorothy Moore's ===
In 2002, the English trip hop trio amillionsons released a song which heavily sampled the track titled "Mistiblue", which reached number 39 in the UK. Monica covered the song on her 1998 multi-platinum album The Boy Is Mine. Mary J. Blige performed it at one of the Share My World Tour shows, which was released into The Tour. Cyndi Lauper covered the song as part of her classic country album Detour in 2016 and also included it as part of the set list on the associated tour.

In 2011 Etta James recorded "Misty Blue" on her final album The Dreamer, a blues version of the song. It was one of the songs she almost always sang at her performances.

== Billie Jo Spears cover version ==
"Misty Blue"

Single by Billie Jo Spears

from the album What I've Got in Mind
- B-side: "Let's Try to Wake Up Again"
- Released: May 1976
- Recorded: January 1976; Nashville, Tennessee, U.S.
- Genre: Country
- Length: 2:36
- Label: United Artists
- Songwriter: Bob Montgomery
- Producer: Larry Butler

Billie Jo Spears singles chronology
"What I've Got in Mind" (1976)	"Misty Blue" (1976)	"Sing Me an Old Fashioned Song" (1976)

The revival of "Misty Blue" by Dorothy Moore renewed country artists' interests in the song. In January 1976, American country music artist Billie Jo Spears recorded the song alongside producer Larry Butler.

Spears had recently regained success with the help of Butler's modern production and had major hits with songs like "Blanket on the Ground" and "What I've Got in Mind". After internationally issuing a single, Spears released "Misty Blue" to the American market in May 1976 via United Artists Records. The song would peak within the top five of the Billboard Hot Country Singles chart that year, becoming Spears's fourth top-ten single. "Misty Blue" was then issued on Spears's 1976 studio album entitled What I've Got in Mind.

=== Weekly charts ===
Chart (1976)	Peak position
Canada Country Tracks (RPM)	4
US Hot Country Singles (Billboard)	5

=== Year-end charts ===
Chart (1976)	Position
US Hot Country Songs (Billboard)	41

=== Track listings ===
7" single

- "Misty Blue" – 2:36
- "Let's Try to Wake It Up Again" – 2:29
