= What I've Got in Mind (song) =

Single by Billie Jo Spears

from the album What I've Got in Mind
- B-side: "Every Time Two Fools Collide"
- Released: February 1976
- Recorded: January 1976
- Studio: Jack Clement Recording (Nashville, Tennessee)
- Genre: Country; Countrypolitan
- Length: 2:39
- Label: United Artists
- Songwriter: Kenny O'Dell
- Producer: Larry Butler

Billie Jo Spears singles chronology
"Silver Wings and Golden Rings" (1975)	"What I've Got in Mind" (1976)	"Misty Blue" (1976)

"What I've Got in Mind" is a song written by Kenny O'Dell that was originally recorded by American country artist, Billie Jo Spears. It was released as a single in 1976 and became a top single in the United States, the United Kingdom and Ireland. It was one of the top-ten singles Spears had during the decade. It was issued on Spears's studio album of the same name in 1976.

== Background, recording and reception ==
Billie Jo Spears achieved commercial success after a several-year hiatus with 1975's chart-topping, "Blanket on the Ground". The song set forth a string of top-ten and top 20 singles for Spears during the decade (all of which were released by United Artists Records). "What I've Got in Mind" was among these follow-up recordings. The song was one of several singles that had similar themes of sexual desire, which were first heard in "Blanket on the Ground". "What I've Got in Mind" was highlighted by author Kurt Wolff of Country Music: The Rough Guide, who described it as a "sexy come on song".

Written by Kenny O'Dell, the track was originally composed as a rhumba. The song was recorded in January 1976 at the Jack Clement Recording Studio, located in Nashville, Tennessee. The session was produced by Larry Butler.

== Release and chart performance ==
"What I've Got in Mind" was released as a single by United Artists Records in February 1976. It was backed on the B-side by the song, "Every Time Two Fools Collide". It was distributed as a seven-inch vinyl single. It debuted on the American Billboard Hot Country Songs chart in February 1976. It spent a total of 16 weeks charting, reaching the number five position in May 1976. "What I've Got in Mind" became Spears's third top-ten single on the Billboard country chart. It reached a similar top-ten position on the Canadian RPM Country Tracks chart, peaking at number three in 1976. It also spent 13 weeks on the UK Singles Chart, peaking at the number four position in 1976. It was later included on Spears's third United Artists studio album, also titled What I've Got in Mind.

== Track listing ==
7" vinyl single

- "What I've Got in Mind" – 2:39
- "Every Time Two Fools Collide" – 2:52

== Charts ==
Weekly chart performance for "What I've Got in Mind"
Chart (1976)	Peak position
Ireland (IRMA)	5
Canada Country Tracks (RPM)	3
Netherlands (Single Top 100)	6
UK Singles (Official Charts)	4
US Hot Country Songs (Billboard)	5
