= Charley Crockett albums discography =

Cataloging of published albums by Charley Crockett

Charley Crockett discography
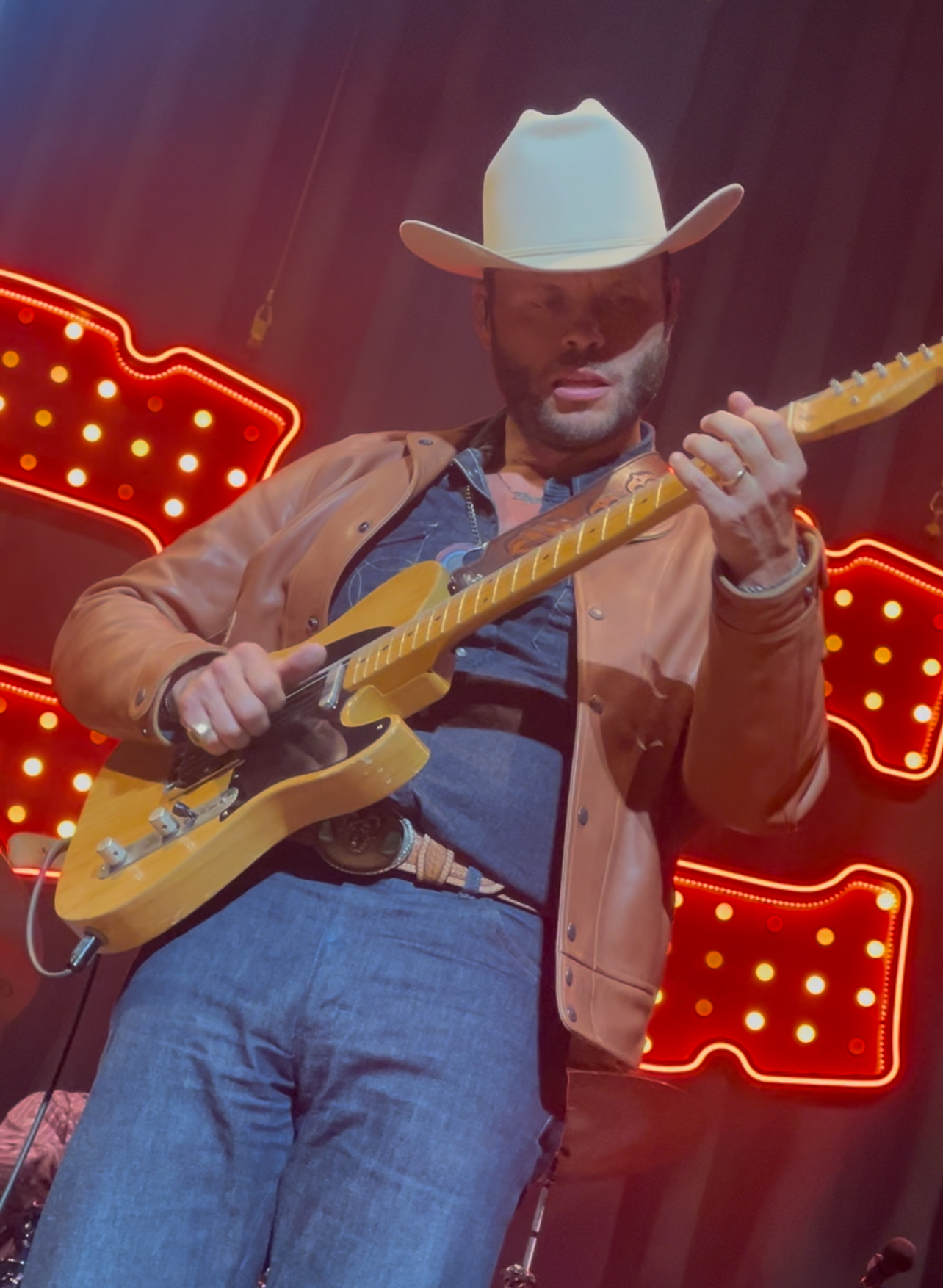
- Studio albums: 17
- EPs: 3
- Live albums: 1
- Singles: 43
- Music videos: 36
- Mixtapes: 2

The following is a complete albums discography of American country music artist Charley Crockett. For his singles, see Charley Crockett singles discography.

== Studio albums ==
=== 2010s ===
Title	Album details	Peak chart positions				Sales
Title	Album details	US	US Blues	US Country	US Heat.	Sales
A Stolen Jewel	Released: May 5, 2015; Label: Son of Davy; Format: CD, digital download	—	—	—	—	
In the Night	Released: June 6, 2016; Label: Son of Davy, Field Day; Format: LP, CD, digital download	—	—	—	—	
Lil' G.L.'s Honky Tonk Jubilee	Released: September 8, 2017; Label: Son of Davy, Field Day; Format: LP, CD, digital download	—	—	—	—	
Lonesome as a Shadow	Released: April 20, 2018; Label: Son of Davy; Format: LP, CD, digital download	—	—	—	14	
Lil' G.L.'s Blue Bonanza	Released: December 7, 2018; Label: Son of Davy, Thirty Tigers; Format: LP, CD, digital download	—	11	—	10	
The Valley	Released: September 20, 2019; Label: Son of Davy, Thirty Tigers; Format: LP, CD, digital download	—	—	—	19	US: 2,700
"—" denotes releases that did not chart

=== 2020s ===
Title	Album details	Peak chart positions				Sales
Title	Album details	US	US Country	US Blues	US Heat	Sales
Welcome to Hard Times	Released: July 31, 2020; Label: Son of Davy, Thirty Tigers; Format: LP, CD, digital download	—	—	—	—	
10 for Slim: Charley Crockett Sings James Hand	Released: February 26, 2021; Label: Son of Davy, Thirty Tigers; Format: LP, CD, digital download	—	—	—	—	
Music City USA	Released: September 17, 2021; Label: Son of Davy, Thirty Tigers; Format: LP, CD, digital download	—	—	—	10	
Lil' G.L. Presents: Jukebox Charley	Released: April 22, 2022; Label: Son of Davy, Thirty Tigers; Format: LP, CD, digital download	—	—	—	—	
The Man from Waco	Released: September 9, 2022; Label: Son of Davy, Thirty Tigers; Format: LP, CD, digital download	199	—	—	—	
$10 Cowboy	Released: April 26, 2024; Label: Son of Davy, Thirty Tigers; Format: LP, CD, digital download	168	—	30	1	
Visions of Dallas	Released: July 22, 2024; Label: Son of Davy, Thirty Tigers; Format: LP, CD, digital download	—	—	—	—	
Lonesome Drifter	Released: March 14, 2025; Label: Lone Star Rider, Island; Format: LP, CD, digital download	128	—	25	—	
Dollar a Day	Released: August 8, 2025; Label: Lone Star Rider, Island; Format: LP, CD, digital download	196	—	37	—	
Age of the Ram	Released: April 3, 2026; Label: Lone Star Rider, Island; Format: LP, CD, digital download	—	—	—	—	
Clovis	Released: April 28, 2026; Label: $10 Cowboy; Format: Digital download	—	—	—	—	
"—" denotes releases that did not chart

== Live albums ==
Title	Album details
Live from the Ryman	Released: September 29, 2023; Label: Son of Davy; Format: CD, LP, digital download, streaming

== Mixtapes ==
Title	Album details
Get Up Outta Texas	Released: March 6, 2014; Label: Son of Davy; Format: CD, Digital download
Field Recordings, Vol. 1	Released: April 3, 2020; Label: Son of Davy; Format: Digital download

== Extended plays ==
Title	EP details
Daytrotter Session	Released: June 29, 2016; Label: Daytrotter; Format: Digital download
OurVinyl Sessions	Released: February 27, 2020; Label: OurVinyl; Format: Digital download
The Man from Waco (Redux)	Released: May 26, 2023; Label: Song of Davy, Thirty Tigers; Format: Digital download

== Music videos ==
Title	Year	Director	Ref.
"Get Up Outta Texas"	2015	Paco Estrada	
"Trinity River"	2015	Daniel Driensky; Sarah M. Reyes	
"In the Night"	2016	Will von Bolton	
"Jamestown Ferry"	2018	Charley Crockett; Lyza Renee	
"I Wanna Cry"	2018	Charley Crockett; Lyza Renee	
"Lil' Girl's Name"	2018	Ray Lewis; Texas Joe	
"Ain't Gotta Worry Child"	2018	Charley Crockett; Mario Valdez	
"Good Time Charley's Got the Blues"	2018	Charley Crockett; Lyza Renee	
"River of Sorrow"	2019	Bobby Cochran	
"That's How I Got to Memphis"	2019	Bobby Cochran	
"Borrowed Time"	2019	Charley Crockett	
"The Valley"	2019	Ben Christensen; Dusty Sousley	
"The Valley" (short film)	2019	Ben Christensen; Dusty Sousley	
"Welcome to Hard Times"	2020	Charley Crockett; Bobby Cochran	
"Run Horse Run"	2020	Charley Crockett; Bobby Cochran	
"Don't Cry"	2020	Charley Crockett; Bobby Cochran	
"Fool Somebody Else"	2020	Charley Crockett; Bobby Cochran	
"Lily My Dear" (live video)	2020	Kevin J. Hamm	
"Wreck Me" (live video)	2020	Kevin J. Hamm	
"The Man That Time Forgot" (live video)	2020	Kevin J. Hamm	
"Lesson in Depression"	2021	Bobby Cochran	
"Midnight Run"	2021	Bobby Cochran	
"I Need Your Love"	2021	Bobby Cochran	
"Round This World"	2021	Bobby Cochran	
"I Won't Cry"	2021	Bobby Cochran	
"Music City USA"	2021	Bobby Cochran	
"I Feel for You"	2022	Spencer Peeples	
"Odessa"	2022	Spencer Peeples	
"I'm Just a Clown"	2022	Bobby Cochran	
"Killers of the Flower Moon"	2023	Paul Ribera	
"Solitary Road"	2024	Jared Cristopher	
"America"	2024	Jared Cristopher	
"Good at Losing"	2024	Jared Cristopher	
"Visions of Dallas"	2024	Fletcher Moore	
"Lonesome Drifter"	2025	Bobby Cochran	
"Game I Can't Win"	2025	Bobby Cochran	
"Night Rider"	2025	Bobby Cochran	
"Bad Company"	2025		
