= Charley Crockett singles discography =

Cataloging of published singles by Charley Crockett

Charley Crockett discography
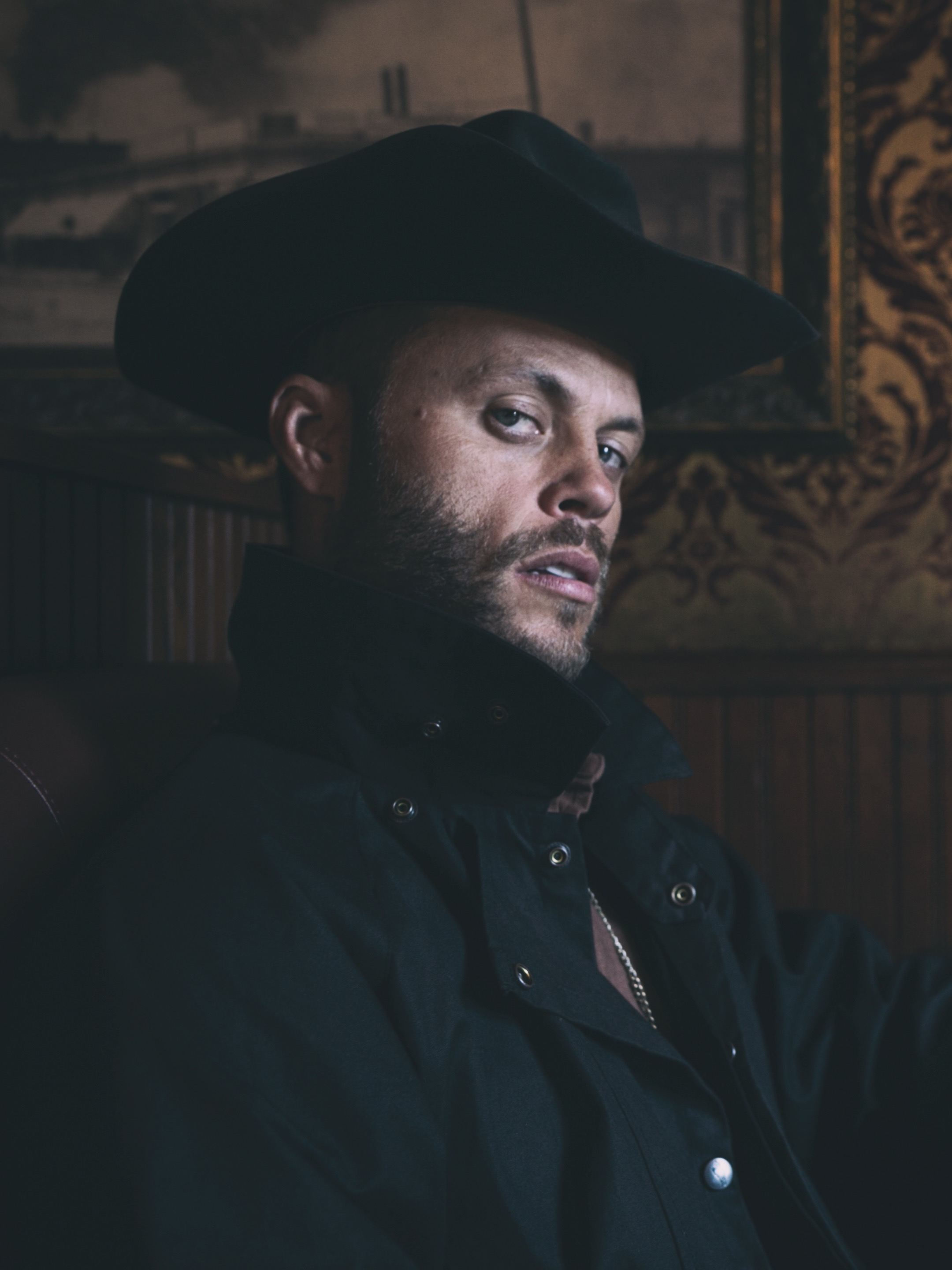
- Singles: 43
- Music videos: 36

The following is a detailed discography of all singles released by American country music singer Charley Crockett.

== As lead artist ==
List of singles, showing year released and album name
Title	Year	Peak chart positions	Album
Title	Year	US AAA	Album
"Get Up Outta Texas"	2015	—	Non-album single
"Trinity River"	2015	—	A Stolen Jewel
"In the Night"	2016	—	In the Night
"Jamestown Ferry"	2018	—	Lil' G.L.'s Honky Tonk Jubilee
"I Wanna Cry"	2018	—	Lonesome as a Shadow
"Lil' Girl's Name"	2018	—	Lonesome as a Shadow
"Ain't Gotta Worry Child"	2018	—	Lonesome as a Shadow
"Good Time Charley's Got the Blues"	2018	—	Lil' G.L.'s Blue Bonanza
"How Low Can You Go"	2019	—	Non-album single
"River of Sorrow"	2019	—	Non-album single
"That's How I Got to Memphis"	2019	—	Lil' G.L.'s Blue Bonanza
"Borrowed Time"	2019	—	The Valley
"The Valley"	2019	—	The Valley
"5 More Miles"	2019	—	The Valley
"9 Lb Hammer"	2019	—	The Valley
"Welcome to Hard Times"	2020	—	Welcome to Hard Times
"Run Horse Run"	2020	—	Welcome to Hard Times
"Don't Cry"	2020	—	Welcome to Hard Times
"Fool Somebody Else"	2020	—	Welcome to Hard Times
"I Can Help"	2021	—	The Next Waltz, Vol. 3
"Lesson in Depression"	2021	—	10 for Slim: Charley Crockett Sings James Hand
"Midnight Run"	2021	—	10 for Slim: Charley Crockett Sings James Hand
"I Need Your Love"	2021	—	Music City USA
"Round This World"	2021	—	Music City USA
"I Won't Cry"	2021	—	Music City USA
"Music City USA"	2021	—	Music City USA
"I Feel for You"	2022	—	Lil' G.L. Presents: Jukebox Charley
"I'm Just a Clown"	2022	—	The Man from Waco
"The Man from Waco"	2022	—	The Man from Waco
"Trinity River"	2022	18	The Man from Waco
"Killers of the Flower Moon"	2023	—	Non-album single
"Fire and Brimstone"	2023	—	Non-album single
"$10 Cowboy"	2024	26	$10 Cowboy
"Hard Luck & Circumstances"	2024	23	$10 Cowboy
"Solitary Road"	2024	23	$10 Cowboy
"Hey Mr. Nashville"	2024	—	Non-album single
"(Ghost) Riders In The Sky"	2024	—	Twisters: The Album
"Lonesome Drifter"	2025	17	Lonesome Drifter
"Game I Can't Win"	2025	—	Lonesome Drifter
"Crucified Son"	2025	38	Dollar a Day
"All Around Cowboy"	2025	—	Dollar a Day
"Bad Company"	2025	—	Can't Get Enough: A Tribute To Bad Company
"Kentucky Too Long"	2026	—*	Age of the Ram
"Fastest Gun Alive"	2026	—*	Age of the Ram
"The Hallelujah Trail"	2026	37	Clovis

== As featured artist ==
List of singles, showing year released and album name
Year	Title	Album
2019	"Hard Luck Kid" (Simon Flory with Dylan Bishop)	Non-album single
2025	"Easy Easy Baby" (Nathan Williams Sr.)	A Tribute to the King of Zydeco

== Music videos ==
Title	Year	Director	Ref.
"Get Up Outta Texas"	2015	Paco Estrada	
"Trinity River"	2015	Daniel Driensky; Sarah M. Reyes	
"In the Night"	2016	Will von Bolton	
"Jamestown Ferry"	2018	Charley Crockett; Lyza Renee	
"I Wanna Cry"	2018	Charley Crockett; Lyza Renee	
"Lil' Girl's Name"	2018	Ray Lewis; Texas Joe	
"Ain't Gotta Worry Child"	2018	Charley Crockett; Mario Valdez	
"Good Time Charley's Got the Blues"	2018	Charley Crockett; Lyza Renee	
"River of Sorrow"	2019	Bobby Cochran	
"That's How I Got to Memphis"	2019	Bobby Cochran	
"Borrowed Time"	2019	Charley Crockett	
"The Valley"	2019	Ben Christensen; Dusty Sousley	
"The Valley" (short film)	2019	Ben Christensen; Dusty Sousley	
"Welcome to Hard Times"	2020	Charley Crockett; Bobby Cochran	
"Run Horse Run"	2020	Charley Crockett; Bobby Cochran	
"Don't Cry"	2020	Charley Crockett; Bobby Cochran	
"Fool Somebody Else"	2020	Charley Crockett; Bobby Cochran	
"Lily My Dear" (live video)	2020	Kevin J. Hamm	
"Wreck Me" (live video)	2020	Kevin J. Hamm	
"The Man That Time Forgot" (live video)	2020	Kevin J. Hamm	
"Lesson in Depression"	2021	Bobby Cochran	
"Midnight Run"	2021	Bobby Cochran	
"I Need Your Love"	2021	Bobby Cochran	
"Round This World"	2021	Bobby Cochran	
"I Won't Cry"	2021	Bobby Cochran	
"Music City USA"	2021	Bobby Cochran	
"I Feel for You"	2022	Spencer Peeples	
"Odessa"	2022	Spencer Peeples	
"I'm Just a Clown"	2022	Bobby Cochran	
"Killers of the Flower Moon"	2023	Paul Ribera	
"America"	2024	Jared Cristopher	
"Good at Losing"	2024	Jared Cristopher	
"America"	2024	Fletcher Moore	
"Lonesome Drifter"	2025	Bobby Cochran	
"Game I Can't Win"	2025	Bobby Cochran	
"Night Rider"	2025	Bobby Cochran	
