= Broke (2025 film) =

- Release poster
- Directed by: Carlyle Eubank
- Written by: Carlyle Eubank
- Produced by: Peter Billingsley; Terry Dougas; David Frigerio; Jack Hearst; Paris Kassidokostas-Latsis; Wyatt Russell; John Stalberg Jr.; Victoria Vaughn; Vince Vaughn
- Starring: Wyatt Russell; Dennis Quaid; Auden Thornton; Mary McDonnell; Johnny Berchtold; Tom Skerritt
- Cinematography: Charlie Sarroff
- Edited by: Glenn Garland
- Music by: John Hancock
- Production companies: Hercules Film Fund; Rhea Films; Slow Burn; Wild West Picture Show Productions
- Distributed by: Sony Pictures Home Entertainment
- Release date: May 6, 2025 (VOD)
- Running time: 103 minutes
- Country: United States
- Language: English

Broke is a 2025 American western drama film written and directed by Carlyle Eubank. It stars Wyatt Russell, Dennis Quaid, Auden Thornton, Mary McDonnell, Johnny Berchtold, and Tom Skerritt, in his final film role.

== Plot ==
A cattle wrangler, True Brandywine, emerges from beneath snow in a desolate meadow. He calls unsuccessfully for his missing horse, Dude, and becomes aware his boot has become dislodged, dangerously exposing his foot to snow. In flashback, True rides a bucking bronco in a rodeo. After the ride, he purchases painkillers from a rodeo competitor turned drug dealer. In the present, True makes his way back to his truck, which he finds is stuck. His foot has symptoms of frostbite and his phone has no reception. He dreams of an earlier rodeo competition. Awake, he locates a cabin on a map and he ventures out of his truck and into a forest.

In flashback, True arrives home to the farm in Elko, Nevada where he lives with his father, George, mother, Kathy, and younger brother, Caleb. His father encourages him to enlist in the Marine Corps, himself a former Marine. In the present, True reaches the cabin and builds a fire. In flashback, True burns himself on his truck's engine and is bandaged by a passing nurse, Ali. He and Ali spend the rest of the evening together and True draws her portrait in a cafe.

In the present, True injects himself with penicillin. In flashback, George, True, and Caleb work together to load hay bales with a hay squeeze. True introduces Ali to his family, and after, in his truck, the two tell each other they love each other. In the present, True leaves the cabin, constructs snowshoes and uses his rifle scope to search for a way out of the forest. In flashback, True and Caleb practice shooting and compare notes regarding wilderness survival. True collapses at another rodeo and is taken to the hospital, where a doctor explains he has traumatic brain injury. Caleb tells True that he has enlisted in the Marines.

In the present, True constructs a snare using a tree. In flashback, True and Ali discuss True's retirement from rodeo and visit an art exhibition. True and George argue while mending a fence before True begins working at Boot Barn. While at lunch, Ali encourages True to attend art school. While they argue about True's future, True receives the news that his brother Caleb has died.

True returns home, where his family is mourning. His father gives him an audio tape, containing Stopping by Woods on a Snowy Evening. True loads his horse in his trailer and breaks up with Ali. True begins "breaking" horses on ranches and at a cattle ranch is hired by the owner Cliff. In the present, he loses a rabbit caught in his snare to a wolf. In flashback, True and Cliff discuss break-ups and the repair of the world. True requests permission to provide veterinary care to cattle that look sick in a distant pasture. True ropes cows from horseback in the remote pasture, during sunny weather conditions. While remounting his horse he passes out; his foot becomes entangled in his lasso and he is dragged by his horse. A snowflake falls on him, beginning a freak spring snowstorm.

Caught up to the present, True struggles to relight his fire, but gives up. Considering suicide, True places his rifle to his chin. After a gunshot, there is a hole in the roof of the cabin and sunlight on True's face. True exits his cabin into the sunshine. He hikes and locates his horse in a clearing outside of the woods. Reaching a road, he flags down a passing snowplow driver, who stops and helps him.

True, his foot revealed to be amputated, mails an art school application. Ali leaves her shift at the hospital and discovers the portrait True originally made of her waiting in her car. In her rearview mirror, True stands waiting for her and she exits the car.

== Cast ==
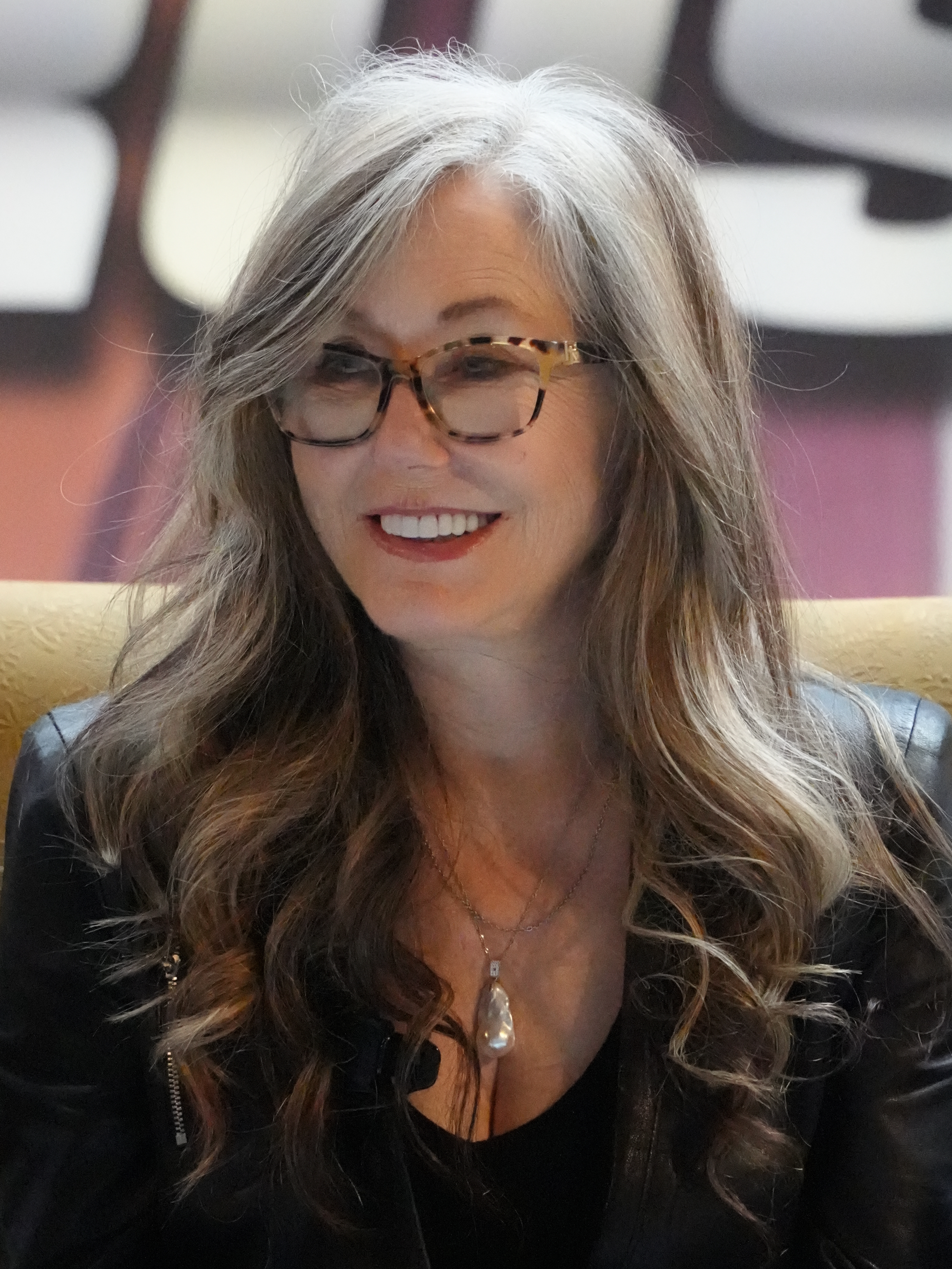
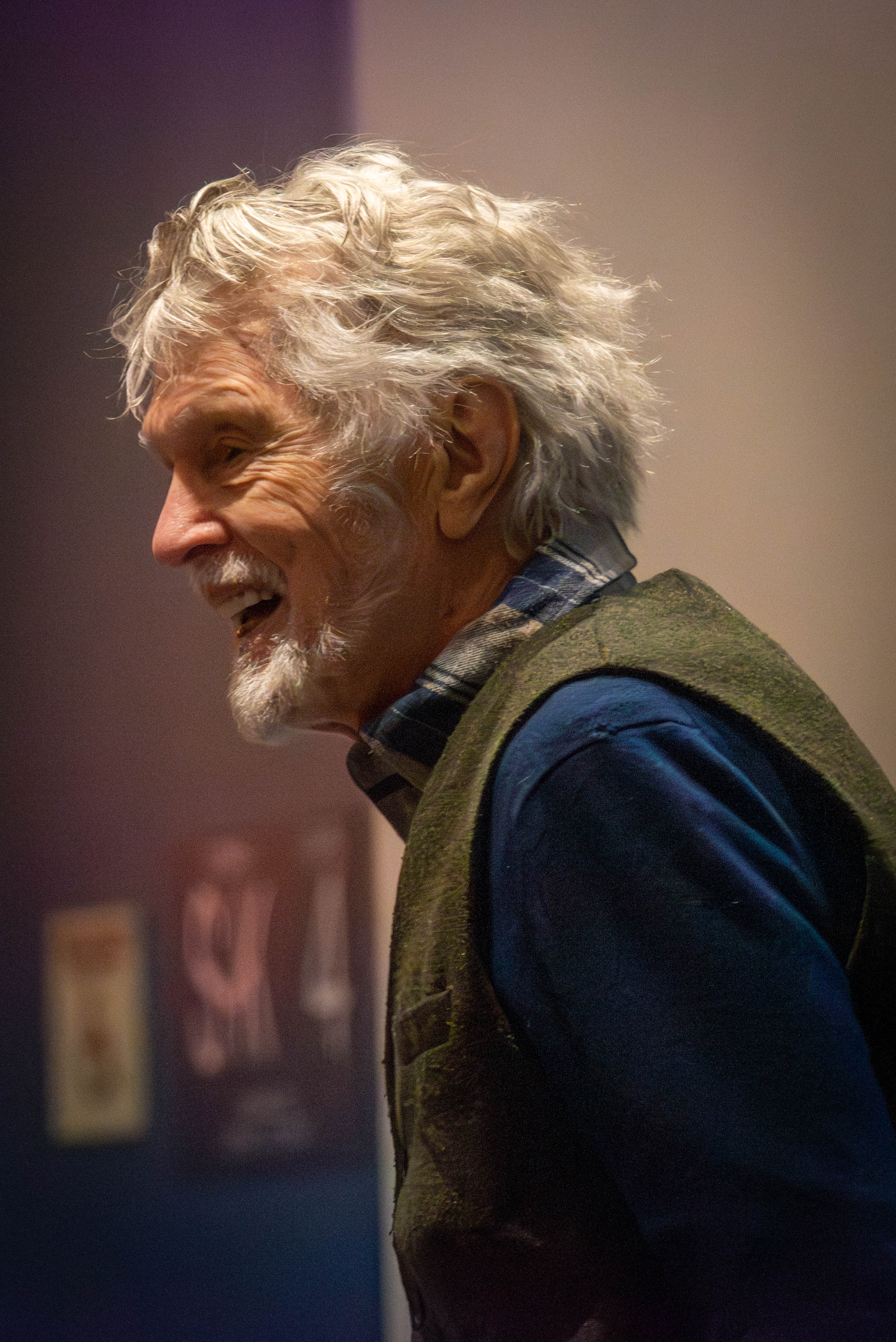
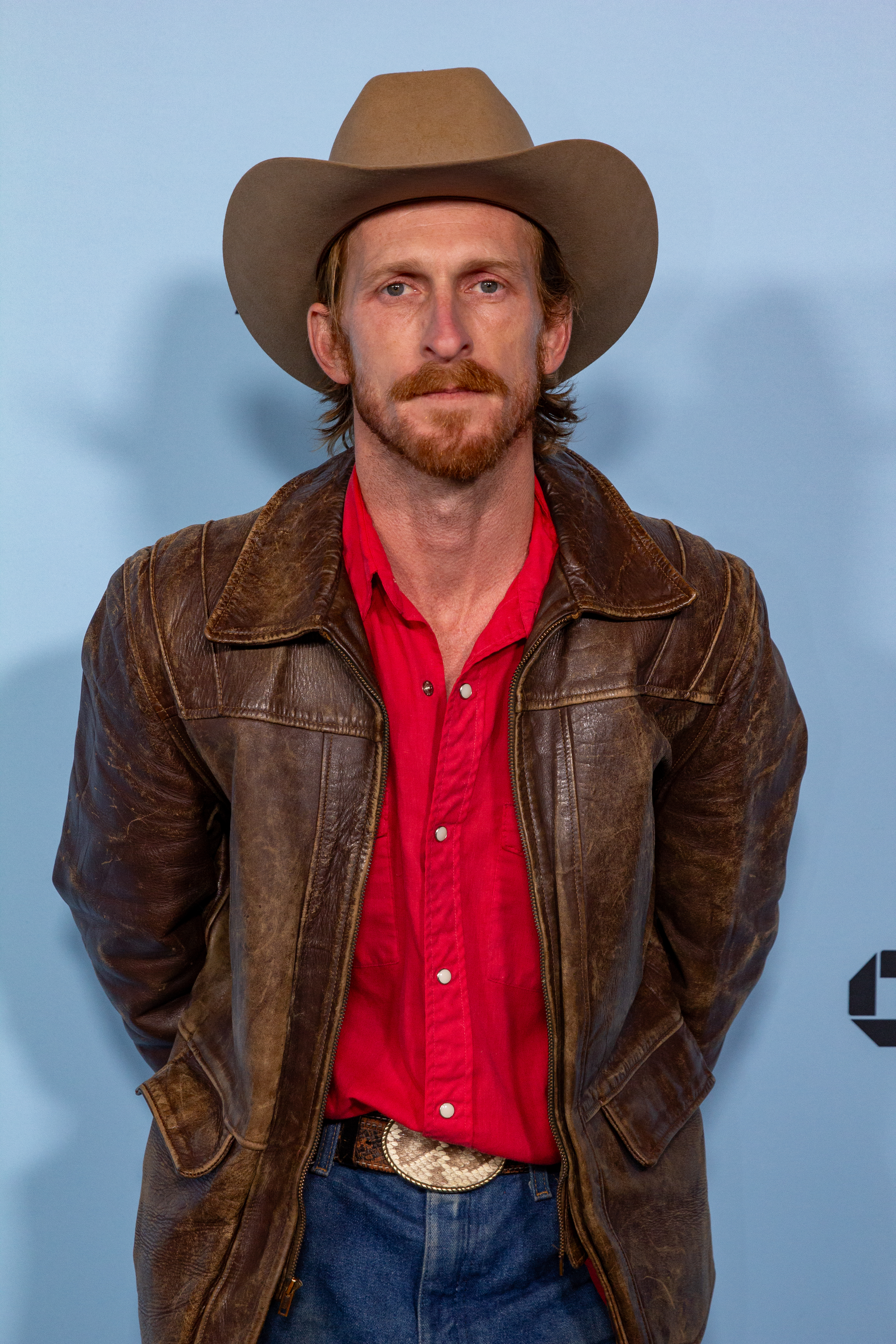
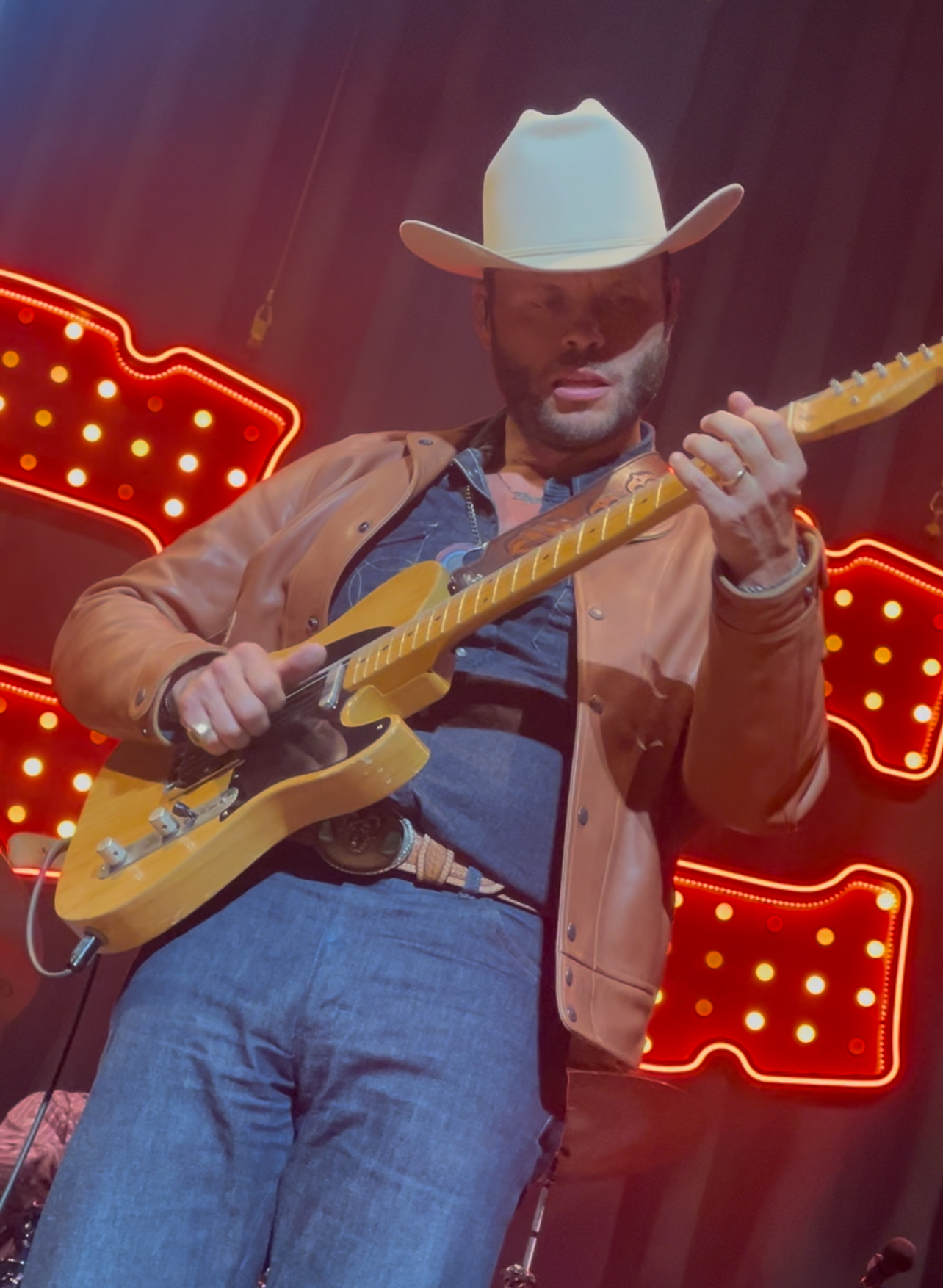
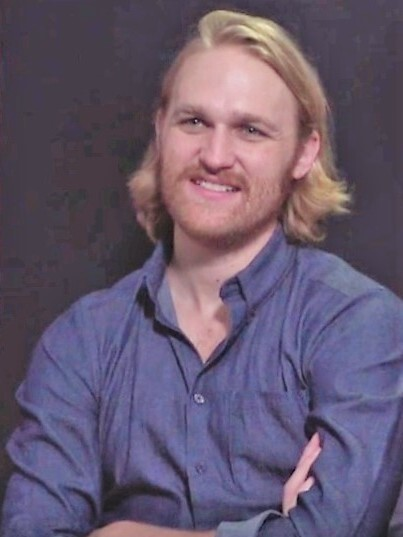
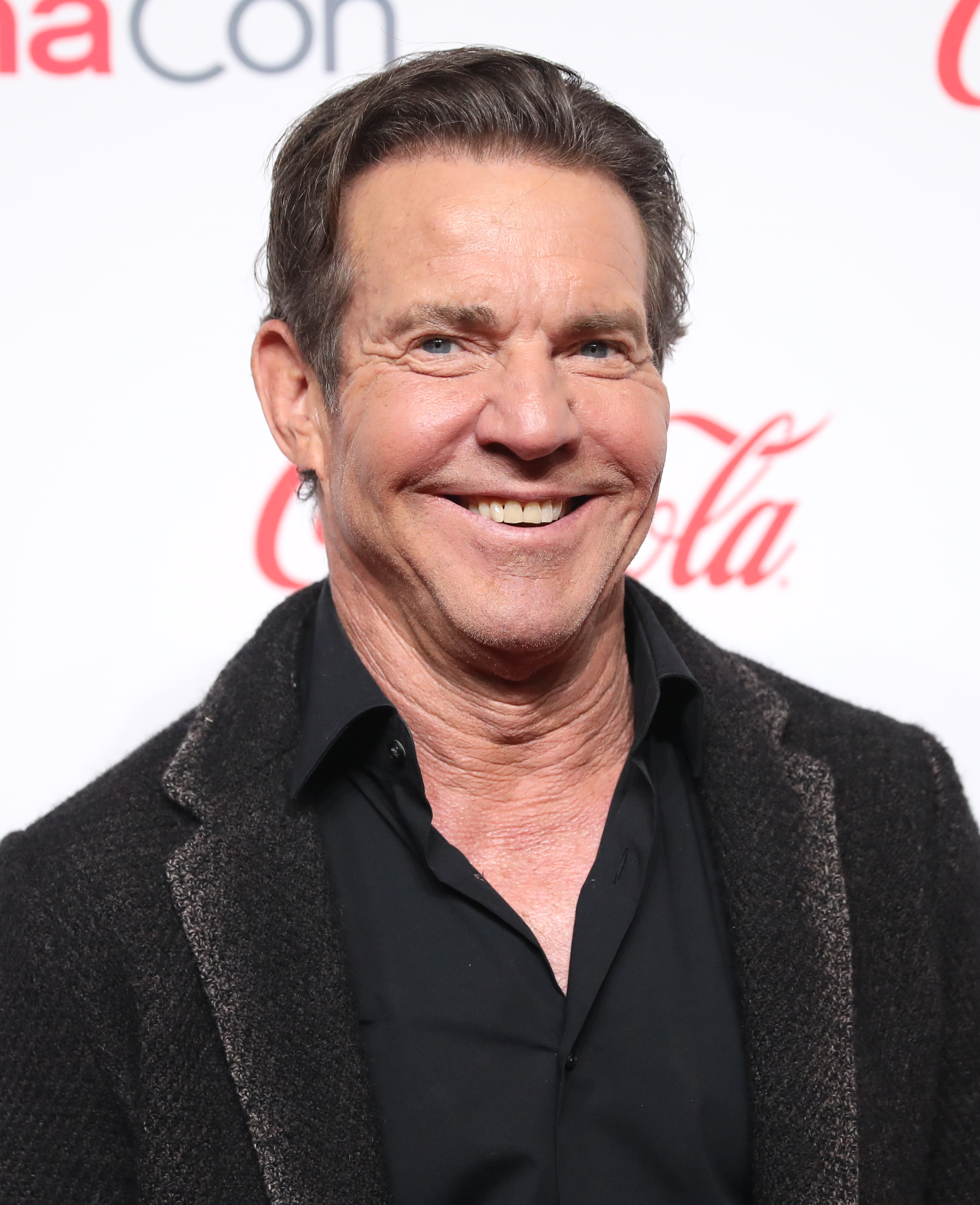
The film features Mary McDonnell, Tom Skerritt, Austin Amelio, Charley Crockett, Wyatt Russell and Dennis Quaid.
- Wyatt Russell as True Brandywine
- Auden Thornton as Ali
- Dennis Quaid as George Brandywine
- Mary McDonnell as Kathy Brandywine
- Johnny Berchtold as Caleb Brandywine
- Tom Skerritt as Cliff
- Austin Amelio as Nervous Cowboy
- Charley Crockett as Snowplow Driver

== Production ==
In April 2025, it was revealed that a western drama film written and directed by Carlyle Eubank was completed for Sony Pictures Home Entertainment, starring Wyatt Russell (who also produces), Dennis Quaid, Auden Thornton, Mary McDonnell, Johnny Berchtold, and Tom Skerritt.

Filming officially began in Montana in February 2021. The scenes set in the wintertime were shot first. In July, filming was done in the cities of Anaconda, Deer Lodge, Butte, Drummond & Three Forks. Filming officially wrapped on July 19, 2021.

In an interview, writer-director Carlyle Eubank cited the 1983 film Never Cry Wolf directed by Carroll Ballard as partially inspiring the film. While accepting the 2025 Western Heritage Award for outstanding motion picture at the National Cowboy & Western Heritage Museum, Eubank stated that the film was made as an origin story exploration of what it might look like if an artist such as Will James, Edward Borein, Frank Tenney Johnson, or Maynard Dixon were working today.

== Music ==
The film's score was composed by composer John Hancock. The song "Cowboy Candy" was written by Charley Crockett for the film. The following songs were featured in the film:

- Steve Earle – "Copperhead Road"
- Charley Crockett – "Cowboy Candy"
- Steve Earle – "Snake Oil"
- Charley Crockett – "Welcome to Hard Times"
- Charley Crockett – "Lonesome as a Shadow"
- Luke Bell – "Where Ya Been?"
- Emily Scott Robinson – "Better With Time"
- Paul Cauthen – "Still Drivin'"
- Charley Crockett – "I Won't Cry"
- Jimmy Dean – "Big Bad John"
- Charley Crockett – "Heads You Win"
- Charles Wesley Godwin – "Jesse"
- Brent Cobb – "Black Bottle"
- Emily Scott Robinson – "Old Gods"
- Hazel English – "I'm Fine"
- Merle Haggard – "My Favorite Memory"
- Brent Cobb – "Black Creek"
- Tyler Childers – "Lady May"

== Release ==
Broke was released on video on demand by Sony Pictures Home Entertainment on May 6, 2025. The film premiered on Netflix in the United States on August 21, 2025.

== Reception ==
=== Critical response ===
On the review aggregator website Rotten Tomatoes, 91% of 11 critics' reviews are positive.

=== Accolades ===
| Award | Category | Nominee(s) | Result | Ref. |
|---|---|---|---|---|
| Australian Cinematographers Society Awards | Victoria and Tasmania Gold Award for Cinematography in a Feature Film (Under $5m) | Charlie Sarroff | Won | |
| Western Heritage Awards | Outstanding Theatrical Motion Picture | Broke | Won | |

== See also ==
- List of American films of 2025
