= Live from the Ryman =

Live album by Charley Crockett
- Released: September 29, 2023
- Recorded: November 14, 2022
- Studio: Ryman Auditorium, Nashville
- Genre: Country
- Length: 1:15:13
- Label: Son of Davy; Thirty Tigers
- Producer: Charley Crockett; Ben Fowler

Charley Crockett chronology
The Man from Waco (2022)	Live from the Ryman (2023)	$10 Cowboy (2024)

Singles from Live from the Ryman
- 1. "Trinity River" Released: March 22, 2023; 2. "Jamestown Ferry" Released: August 18, 2023

Live from the Ryman is a live album and concert film by Charley Crockett, released on Son of Davy through Thirty Tigers on September 29, 2023.

== Background ==
Recorded on November 14, 2022 to a sold-out crowd at The Ryman Auditorium in Nashville, Tennessee, the album is the first ever live album in Crockett's catalog.

== Concert film ==
Live from the Ryman
- Release poster
- Produced by: Son of Davy; Thirty Tigers
- Starring: Charley Crockett; The Blue Drifters
- Music by: Charley Crockett; The Blue Drifters
- Distributed by: PBS; Son of Davy; Thirty Tigers
- Release date: September 29, 2023
- Running time: 75 minutes
- Country: United States
- Language: English

In addition to the album's release, an hour and 16 minute length concert film was released alongside it, going onto Crockett's official YouTube for a limited release before being put on PBS to stream and broadcast.

== Track listing ==
Live from the Ryman track listing
No.	Title	Writer(s)	Length
1.	"Cowboy Candy"	Charley Crockett	04:00
2.	"Time of the Cottonwood Trees"	Crockett	03:01
3.	"Just Like Honey"	Crockett; Kullen Fuchs	02:36
4.	"Black Sedan"	Crockett; Fuchs	03:11
5.	"The Man From Waco"	Crockett; Fuchs; Bruce Robison; Taylor Grace	03:38
6.	"Between My House and Town"	Sanger D. Shafer	02:21
7.	"Odessa"	Crockett; Nathan Fleming	02:52
8.	"The Valley"	Crockett	03:34
9.	"Jukebox Charley"	Johnny Paycheck; Aubrey Mayhew	02:33
10.	"Music City USA"	Crockett; Mark Neill	02:58
11.	"Midnight Run / Lesson in Depression"	James Hand; Deborah J. Perry	04:34
12.	"Don't Tell Me That"	Hand	03:01
13.	"Welcome to Hard Times"	Crockett	02:50
14.	"Name on a Billboard"	Crockett	02:57
15.	"Jamestown Ferry"	Mack Vickery; Bobby Borchers	03:29
16.	"I Feel for You"	Jerry Reed	03:10
17.	"Travelin' Blues"	H. Eddy Owens	03:05
18.	"Round This World"	Crockett	02:39
19.	"Trinity River"	Crockett	04:31
20.	"I'm Just a Clown"	Crockett	03:51
21.	"Goin' Back To Texas"	Crockett	03:15
22.	"Tecumseh Valley"	Townes Van Zandt	02:47
23.	"Paint It Blue"	Crockett	04:20
Total length:			01:15:13

== Personnel ==
Musicians

- Charley Crockett – lead vocals, electric guitar, acoustic guitar, banjo
- Alexis Sanchez – electric guitar
- Nathan Fleming - pedal steel
- Kullen Fox - accordion, keyboards, trumpet, backing vocals
- Mario Valdez - percussion
- Jacob Marchese - electric bass, upright bass

Technical

- Ben Fowler - production, mixing
- Charley Crockett - production
- Jake Burns - engineering
- Jim Wilson - mastering
- Jordan Pratt - digital editing
- Jeff Powell - lacquer cut

Visuals

- Micah Givens – artwork
- Eric Ahlgrim - photography
- Trenton Johnson – photography

== Charts ==
Chart performance for Live from the Ryman
Chart (2023)	Peak position
UK Americana Albums (OCC)	27
