= Age of the Ram =

2026 album by Charley Crockett

Studio album by Charley Crockett
- Released: April 3, 2026
- Recorded: October 20–31, 2025
- Studios: Sunset Sound Studio 3, Los Angeles, California
- Genre: Country
- Length: 45:20
- Labels: Lone Star Rider; Island
- Producers: Charley Crockett; Shooter Jennings

Charley Crockett chronology
Dollar a Day (2025)	Age of the Ram (2026)	Clovis (2026)

Singles from Age of the Ram
- 1. "Kentucky Too Long" Released: February 13, 2026; 2. "Fastest Gun Alive" Released: March 12, 2026

Age of the Ram is the sixteenth studio album by Charley Crockett, released on Lone Star Rider through Island Records on April 3, 2026. The album is the third and final part of Crockett's Sagebrush Trilogy of albums, which began with the release of Lonesome Drifter in March 2025 and continued with Dollar a Day that August.

== Background ==
The story surrounding the album follows the fictional character of Billy McClane, who comes from Marty Robbins' 1963 single "Old Red". Crockett initially started using the character in the title track to his 2024 album $10 Cowboy.

=== Recording ===
The album began recording on October 20, 2025, marking Shooter Jennings' final set of recordings in his residency at Sunset Sound in Los Angeles, California. The album wrapped up initial recordings on October 31. The album was later previewed on YouTube by Mario "Mayo" Valdez, The Blue Drifters' drummer, in a three-and-a-half-minute video on November 4.

The album's first single, "Kentucky Too Long", was released on February 13, 2026.

== Track listing ==
Age of the Ram track listing
No.	Title	Writer(s)	Length
1.	"Life & Times of Billy McLane (Theme I)"	Charley Crockett	0:57
2.	"Lonesome Dove"	Crockett	3:04
3.	"Rancho Deluxe (Main Theme)"	Jimmy Buffett	2:06
4.	"My Last Drink of Wine"	Crockett	3:20
5.	"Fastest Gun Alive"	Charley Crockett; Kyle Madrigal	3:08
6.	"Diamond Belle (Country Boy)"	Crockett	2:32
7.	"I Shot Jesse James"	Crockett; Taylor Grace; Shooter Jennings	2:49
8.	"Life & Times of Billy McLane (Theme II)"	Crockett	0:26
9.	"Crazy Women Ridge"	Crockett	3:30
10.	"Remembering Pat"	Crockett	0:46
11.	"Sweet Mother Texas"	Sanger D. Shafer; Eddy Raven	1:36
12.	"Kentucky Too Long"	Crockett	3:40
13.	"Border Winds"	Domenico Colarossi	0:33
14.	"Rancho Deluxe (End Theme)"	Buffett	2:08
15.	"Billy McLane"	Crockett	3:17
16.	"Life & Times of Billy McLane (Theme III)"	Crockett	0:42
17.	"Powder River"	Crockett	0:47
18.	"Low Down Freedom"	Billy Joe Shaver	3:04
19.	"Me & Shooter"	Crockett	3:13
20.	"Cover My Trail Tonight"	Crockett; Colarossi; Madrigal	3:42
Total length:			45:20

== Personnel ==
Credits adapted from Tidal.

- Charley Crockett – vocals, production (all tracks); guitar (tracks 5–8, 10, 11, 13, 15, 20)
- Shooter Jennings – production (all tracks), mixing (1–4, 9, 10, 12, 14, 16–19), organ (5), celesta (6, 8), guitar (7, 10, 15)
- David Spreng – engineering (all tracks), mixing (1–4, 9, 10, 12, 14, 16–19)
- Nate Haessly – engineering assistance
- Sam Patlove – mixing (all tracks)
- Pete Lyman – mastering
- Kullen Fox – Clavinet (1–4, 9, 12, 14, 16–20), Wurlitzer electric piano (5, 13, 15), piano (6–8), horn (7), background vocals (10), celesta (10, 15), harp (13), guitar (15), organ (20)
- Mario Valdez – percussion (1, 15), drums (2–10, 12–20)
- Jay Moeller – drums (2–4, 9, 12, 14, 16–20)
- Kyle Madrigal – bass (5–8, 13, 15, 20), background vocals (10), celesta (20)
- Alexis Sanchez – guitar (7, 10, 15, 20)
- Nathan Fleming – Dobro guitar (10, 13), pedal steel guitar (20)

== Charts ==
Chart performance for Age of the Ram
Chart (2026)	Peak position
Croatian International Albums (HDU)	21
UK Americana Albums (Official Charts)	18
UK Country Albums (Official Charts)	5
US Americana/Folk Albums (Billboard)	20
US Top Album Sales (Billboard)	19
US Top Country Albums (Billboard)	46
