= Grammy Award for Best Traditional Country Album =

Award presented by the Recording Academy

- Ain't in It for My Health by Zach Top is the most recent recipient.
- Awarded for: Quality vocal or instrumental traditional country recordings (albums only)
- Presented by: National Academy of Recording Arts and Sciences
- First award: 2026
- Currently held by: Zach Top – Ain't in It for My Health (2026)
- Website: grammy.com

The Grammy Award for Best Traditional Country Album is an award presented by the Recording Academy to honor quality traditional country music performances in any given year. The award was presented for the first time at the 68th Annual Grammy Awards in 2026, as a complement to the newly renamed Best Contemporary Country Album category, and sits in the Country & American Roots genre field.

The academy announced the new category in June 2025, stating that the award "recognizes excellence in albums of traditional country music, both vocal and instrumental. Traditional country includes country recordings that adhere to the more traditional sound structures of the country genre, including rhythm and singing style, lyrical content, as well as traditional country instrumentation such as acoustic guitar, steel guitar, fiddle, banjo, mandolin, piano, electric guitar, and live drums. It also includes sub-genres such as Western, Western Swing, and Outlaw country."

The award goes to the artist(s), producer(s), and mixers(s) of the album.

== Background ==
It was noted that a proposal for the category had been submitted several times previously before being passed, and that it was created to honor a wider range of artists who fall outside of the commercial mainstream country music scene based in Nashville, and highlighted a need to separate these artists from those making Americana, roots, and folk music, who were all competing in the over-subscribed American Roots categories. The Academy specifically highlighted artists such as Charley Crockett, Sierra Ferrell, Colter Wall, and Noeline Hofmann, the former two having previously been nominated in Americana categories, and the general growth in popularity of country and its subgenres as reasons why the category was approved. The Academy also noted that the separation of the Best Country Album category brings the genre into line with other genres, such as R&B, Pop, and Blues, which all have distinct categories honoring Traditional and Contemporary styles.

Regarding the establishment of this category, which was announced alongside Best Album Cover, Recording Academy CEO Harvey Mason Jr. stated: "The community of people that are making country music in all different subgenres came to us with a proposal and said we would like to have more variety in how our music is honored. They said, we think we need more space for our music to be celebrated and honored. It makes country parallel with what's happening in other genres, but it is also creating space for where this genre is going. The issues have been, traditionally, a lot of people that weren't sure whether [an album] was Americana or roots or folk or country were just jamming everything into one category. There are obviously nuances between the different genres. Those experts in those genres understand those nuances, and I'm quite certain now you're going to see the right people going into Americana versus folk versus traditional country. [The change] gives us an opportunity to put things in more specific categories."

== Reception ==
The introduction of the Grammy Award for Best Traditional Country Album category received mixed reception from music journalists and commentators. Some writers noted that the timing of the category's creation closely followed the release and commercial success of Beyoncé's 2024 album Cowboy Carter, which prominently incorporated country music traditions while challenging cultural assumptions surrounding the genre. Critics of the new category argued that separating "traditional" country risks reinforcing cultural and racial boundaries within the genre, potentially positioning artists who do not conform to historical genre norms as "outsiders."

Supporters of the category argue that establishing a formal distinction preserves traditional instrumentation, songwriting structures, and performance practices within country music history. Many praised that additional projects by country artists would be able to be recognized.

== Recipients ==
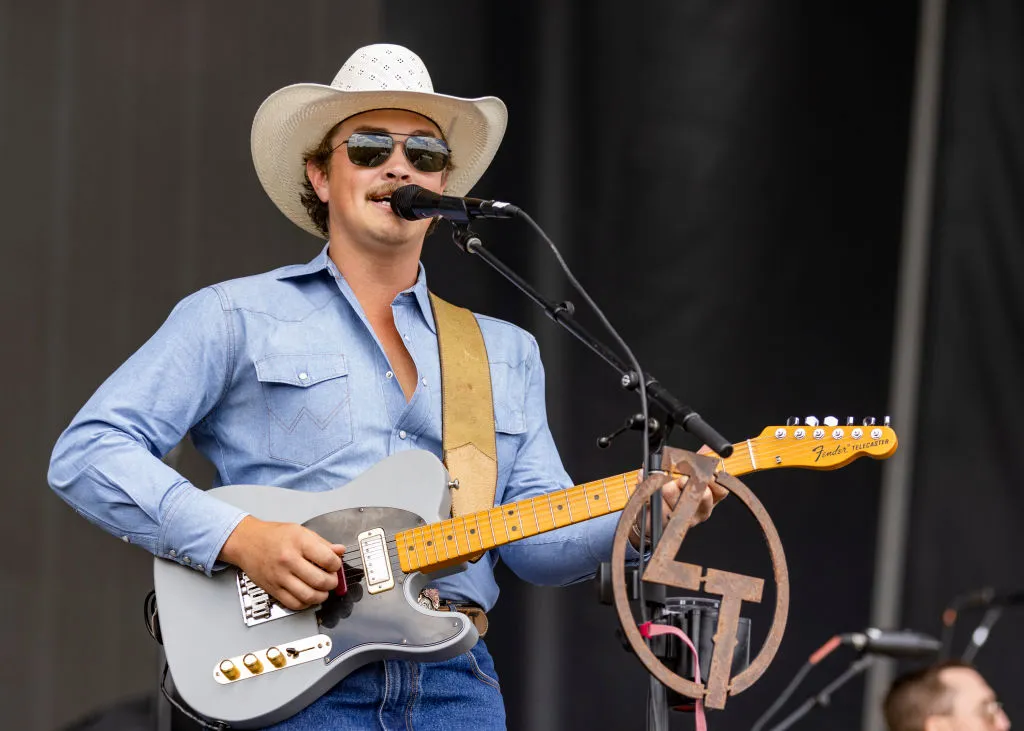
Inaugural winner Zach Top.

Year	Work	Artist
2026
2026	Ain't in It for My Health	Zach Top
2026	American Romance	Lukas Nelson
2026	Dollar a Day	Charley Crockett
2026	Hard Headed Woman	Margo Price
2026	Oh What a Beautiful World	Willie Nelson
2027	Banks of the Trinity	Cody Johnson
2027	Clovis	Charley Crockett
2027	50 Years from Home: Down at the Borderline	Vince Gill
2027	Once Upon a Second Time Around	Charlie Worsham
2027	Workin' Man: Willie Sings Merle	Willie Nelson

^{^[I]} Each year is linked to the article about the Grammy Awards held that year.

== Artists with multiple nominations ==
2 nominations

- Charley Crockett
- Willie Nelson
