= Blackjack County Chain =

Single by Willie Nelson
- B-side: "Some Other World"
- Released: May 1967
- Recorded: 1967
- Studio: RCA Studio B (Nashville, Tennessee)
- Genre: Country
- Length: 2:00
- Label: RCA Victor
- Songwriter(s): Red Lane
- Producer(s): Chet Atkins

Willie Nelson singles chronology
"The Party's Over" (1967)	"Blackjack County Chain" (1967)	"San Antonio" (1967)

"Blackjack County Chain" is a song written by Red Lane and originally recorded by Willie Nelson in 1967. The song was initially rejected by Charley Pride, who considered at the time the lyrics controversial. Nelson later re-recorded the song as a duet with Waylon Jennings in 1983 on their album Take It to the Limit.

Nelson's initial version saw success, however, it was eventually banned by radio stations.

Russell Crowe performed a version of the song on the Irish television show the Late Late Show on 9/9/22.

== Overview ==
"Blackjack County Chain" was written by country music artist Red Lane. The song depicts the killing of a Georgia sheriff by members of a chain gang, as recounted by one of them. Lane offered initially the song to Charley Pride. Anticipating a possible controversy he refrained from recording it.

Lane then offered the song to his friend Willie Nelson. Nelson had recently a hit single with "The Party's Over", that peaked at twenty-four in Billboard's Hot Country Singles. Nelson's version of "Blackjack County Chain" was released with a cover of Floyd Tillman's "Some Other World" on the flipside. The single debuted in May 1967. RCA Records published a full-page advertising promoting the single on Billboard. On its review, the publication praised the work of producer Chet Atkins, while it declared "(Nelson's) moving rendition [...] should be working its way up to the top".

The song met instant success, reaching number twenty-four on the country singles chart. At the time the song's popularity was growing, most of the radio stations banned it from airplay due to its content. Nelson re-recorded the song as a duet with Waylon Jennings for their 1983 collaboration Take it to the Limit.

== Chart performance ==
Chart (1967)	Peak position
Billboard Hot Country Singles	21

== Cover versions ==
=== Studio versions ===
Irish folk singer Christy Moore covered "Blackjack County Chain" on the album Smoke and Strong Whiskey released in 1991. Bluegrass music performer Del McCoury covered the song (as "Blackjack County Chains") on the 1996 Del McCoury Band album The Cold Hard Facts. Charley Crockett would cover the song, releasing his version in 2020 on the album Welcome to Hard Times.
