= Vincent Neil Emerson =

American singer-songwriter

- Born: April 30, 1992 (age 34); Van Zandt County, Texas, U.S.
- Origin: Fort Worth, Texas
- Genres: country, country rock, Western swing, singer-songwriter, folk, honky-tonk
- Occupations: Singer-songwriter, guitarist
- Instrument: Guitar
- Years active: 2019–present

Vincent Neil Emerson is an American country singer-songwriter and guitar player from Texas. He has released four albums: 2019's Fried Chicken and Evil Women, 2021's Vincent Neil Emerson, 2023's The Golden Crystal Kingdom, and 2026’s Blue Stars. The Golden Crystal Kingdom was produced by Shooter Jennings and released on La Honda Records/RCA Records, while Vincent Neil Emerson was produced by Rodney Crowell.

== Personal life ==
Emerson was born and grew up in Van Zandt County, Texas, where he was raised by his mother after his father's suicide and also lived next to other members of his extended family. On his mother's side he is also part of the Choctaw-Apache Tribe of Ebarb, whose history, and in particular the displacement of tribal members to build the Toledo Bend Reservoir, he described in his song "The Ballad of the Choctaw-Apache" on his album Vincent Neil Emerson. He has described himself as "indigenous." He told Rolling Stone that he dealt with mental health issues, including depression, when he was a teenager. He later moved to Fort Worth, Texas, where he spent time busking, sometimes while being homeless, but he also lived for a time in San Antonio.

== Music ==
Emerson, before releasing his debut album, served as an opening act for Turnpike Troubadours and American Aquarium. In 2019, Charley Crockett also covered his song "7 come 11", featured on Emerson's album Fried Chicken and Evil Women. Emerson would also later cover Crockett's song "Time of the Cottonwood Trees" on his album The Golden Crystal Kingdom.

The TV show Reservation Dogs, which is focused on the lives of Native American teenagers, featured multiple songs by Emerson. This relationship began with a cover of the Leon Russell song "Manhattan Island Serenade", but it also included his song "25 and Wastin' Time." Emerson also made a music video for his song "Little Wolf's Invincible Yellow Medicine Paint" that was filmed in Wyoming and featured the bareback horse rider, Sharmaine Weed. He has also had a song appear in the soundtrack for the TV show, Yellowstone.

Emerson has cited the Texas songwriters Townes Van Zandt, Steve Earle, and Guy Clark as major influences on his music, as well as Bob Dylan and Neil Young of Crosby, Stills, Nash & Young. He also cited Jonny Fritz as a major influence on Fried Chicken and Evil Women in particular. In 2021, he told Rolling Stone that his favorite song was "Rex's Blues" by Townes van Zandt; in that interview he also expressed his admiration for Justin Townes Earle. He has also described his album The Golden Crystal Kingdom as "less of a country album and more of a rock 'n' roll album."

Emerson is managed by Travis Blankenship, who is also a co-founder of his record label La Honda Records along with Connie Collingsworth. La Honda Records is named after a town where Ken Kesey once lived and hosted the Grateful Dead. Fried Chicken and Evil Women was the first album that La Honda released, and it has since gone on to release his other two albums. It has also released albums by Colter Wall, Riddy Arman, and The Local Honeys.

Emerson has more recently served as an opening act for Colter Wall and Charley Crockett, as well as touring with the musician John R. Miller.

=== Critical reception ===
The Golden Crystal Kingdom got a mixed review from No Depression.

== Discography ==
=== Albums ===
Albums
Title	Release date	Record label	Catalog number	Producer
Fried Chicken and Evil Women	2019	La Honda Records/Thirty Tigers	LHR001	
Vincent Neil Emerson	June 25, 2021	La Honda Records/Thirty Tigers	LHR007	Rodney Crowell
The Golden Crystal Kingdom	2023	La Honda Records/RCA Records	19658854281	Shooter Jennings
Blue Stars	2026	La Honda Records/RCA Records	LHR018	Patrick Lyons

=== Singles ===
Singles
Title	Year	Record label	Album
"Road Runner" (with Colter Wall)	2020	La Honda Records	Non-album single
"Manhattan Island Serenade"	2020	La Honda Records	Non-album single
"Cowgirl in the Sand (Luck Mansion Sessions)"	2022	La Honda Records	Non-album single
"Son of a Bitch"	2022	La Honda Records	Non-album single
"Clover on the Hillside"	2023	La Honda Records/RCA Records	The Golden Crystal Kingdom
"Time of the Rambler"	2023	La Honda Records/RCA Records	The Golden Crystal Kingdom
"Little Wolf's Invincible Yellow Medicine Paint"	2023	La Honda Records/RCA Records	The Golden Crystal Kingdom
