= Visions of Dallas =

2024 album by Charley Crockett

Studio album by Charley Crockett
- Released: July 22, 2024
- Studio: Arlyn Studios
- Genre: Country
- Length: 36:03
- Labels: Son of Davy; Thirty Tigers
- Producers: Charley Crockett; Billy Horton

Charley Crockett chronology
$10 Cowboy (2024)	Visions of Dallas (2024)	Lonesome Drifter (2025)

Visions of Dallas (stylized as $10 Cowboy Chapter II: Visions of Dallas) is the thirteenth studio album by Charley Crockett, released on Son of Davy through Thirty Tigers on July 22, 2024.

== Background ==
The album's content was initially intended to be featured on $10 Cowboy, serving as a double album. Crockett would reveal in an August 2025 interview that Thirty Tigers did not like the idea of a double album and ended up splitting it into two separate albums with $10 Cowboy and the latter album Visions of Dallas.

Following the release of his April album, $10 Cowboy, Crockett would follow it up with the release of a part two, to the album in the form of Visions of Dallas. The album leaned heavily into covering tracks, seeing 6 of the 12 tracks be covers, far removed from $10 Cowboy which only saw 1 cover track.

The album would serve as his final release with Thirty Tigers before signing with Island Records in early 2025. It would also mark the end of his Son of Davy imprint that he had used since 2014, as he would rebrand the label to Lone Star Rider with the signing to Island.

== Track listing ==
No.	Title	Writer(s)	Length
1.	"Visions of Dallas"	Charley Crockett; Taylor Grace	03:27
2.	"Avoiding Mirrors"	Crockett	02:49
3.	"Trouble and Misery"	Hoyt Axton	02:54
4.	"Killers of the Flower Moon"	Crockett; T Bone Burnett	03:13
5.	"Crystal Chandeliers and Burgundy"	J.W. Routh	02:30
6.	"How Low Can You Go"	Crockett; Kullen Fox	02:55
7.	"Lonesome Feeling"	Billy Henson	02:40
8.	"Charlene"	Crockett; Billy Horton	03:36
9.	"Loser's Lounge"	Bobby Pierce	02:57
10.	"20-20 Vision"	Crockett	03:41
11.	"Loretta"	Townes Van Zandt	02:50
12.	"Goodbye Holly"	Bob Dylan	02:31
Total length:			36:03

== Personnel ==
Musicians

- Charley Crockett – lead vocals, acoustic guitar
- Alexis Sanchez – electric guitar, acoustic guitar
- Nathan Fleming – steel guitar, dobro
- Jacob Marchese – bass
- Kullen Fox – clavinet, acoustic guitar, Hammond B3 organ, Wurlitzer organ, piano, backing vocals
- Andre Hayward – tuba
- Anthony Farrell – organ, backing vocals
- Billy Horton – bass, horn arrangements
- Bruce Robison – harmonica, backing vocals
- Dan Walton – piano
- Dave Biller – electric guitar
- Jason Moeller – drums
- John Mills – horn arrangements
- Jordan Cook – drums
- Kevin Smith – bass
- Leo Gauna – trombone
- Matthew Kirk – backing vocals
- Mike Sailors – flugelhorn
- Rich Brotherton – acoustic guitar, dobro
- Angela Miller – backing vocals
- Lauren Cervantes – backing vocals
- T. Jarrod Bonta – piano
- Willie Pipkin – electric guitar

Technical

- Charley Crockett – production
- Billy Horton – production
- Sam Patlove – mastering, mixing
- Mark Neill – mixing
- Trina Shoemaker – mixing

Visuals

- Micah Givens – artwork
- Bobby Cochran – photography

== Charts ==
Chart performance for Visions of Dallas
Chart (2024)	Peak position
UK Independent Albums (Official Charts)	16
