= Music City USA =

2021 album by Charley Crockett

Studio album by Charley Crockett
- Released: September 17, 2021
- Studios: Soil of the South Studios, Valdosta, Georgia
- Genre: Country
- Length: 49:50
- Labels: Son of Davy; Thirty Tigers
- Producer: Mark Neill

Charley Crockett chronology
10 for Slim: Charley Crockett Sings James Hand (2021)	Music City USA (2021)	Lil' G.L. Presents: Jukebox Charley (2022)

Singles from Music City USA
- 1. "I Need Your Love" Released: July 9, 2021; 2. "Round This World" Released: August 6, 2021; 3. "I Won't Cry" Released: August 27, 2021

Music City USA is the ninth studio album by American singer Charley Crockett, released on September 17, 2021, through Son of Davy and distributed by Thirty Tigers. It was produced by Mark Neill at Soil of the South Studios in Valdosta, Georgia.

The album's cover art pays tribute to Waylon Jennings' 1966 album, Leavin' Town.

== Documentary ==
The Road To Music City USA
- Release poster
- Directed by: Bobby Cochran
- Produced by: Son of Davy; Thirty Tigers
- Starring: Charley Crockett; The Blue Drifters
- Cinematography: Bobby Cochran; David Wilson
- Music by: Charley Crockett; The Blue Drifters
- Distributed by: Son of Davy; Thirty Tigers
- Release date: September 15, 2021
- Running time: 45 minutes
- Country: United States
- Language: English

A 45-minute length documentary entitled The Road To Music City USA was filmed around the recording of the album and released 2 days before the release of the album, following Crockett and producer Mark Neill between various sessions at Neill's studio in Valdosta, Georgia.

== Track listing ==
Music City USA track listing
No.	Title	Writer(s)	Length
1.	"Honest Fight"	Charley Crockett; Mark Neill	3:25
2.	"I Need Your Love"	Crockett; Neill	3:21
3.	"The World Just Broke My Heart"	Crockett; Neill	2:38
4.	"Are We Lonesome Yet"	Crockett; Neill; Taylor Grace	2:54
5.	"This Foolish Game"	Crockett; Neill	3:30
6.	"Round This World"	Crockett	3:06
7.	"Music City USA"	Crockett; Neill	3:02
8.	"Just So You Know"	Crockett; Neill	3:14
9.	"Lies and Regret"	Crockett; Neill	2:31
10.	"I Won't Cry"	Crockett	3:35
11.	"Smoky"	Crockett	3:08
12.	"Muddy Water"	Joseph T. Babcock	2:55
13.	"518"	Crockett; Neill	2:57
14.	"Only Game in Town"	Dallas Burrow; Crockett	4:01
15.	"Hanger On"	Crockett	2:36
16.	"Skip a Rope"	Jack Moran; Glenn Douglas Tubb	2:57
Total length:			49:50

== Personnel ==
Musicians

- Charley Crockett – lead vocals, acoustic guitar, banjo
- Alexis Sanchez – lead guitar, rhythm guitar
- Nathan Fleming – pedal steel
- Kullen Fox – Hammond B3 organ, piano, trumpet, vibraphone
- Billy Horton – bass
- Mario Valdez – congas, drums
- Ben Davis – saxophone
- Colin Colby – guitar, background vocals
- Erik Hokkanen – fiddle
- Roger Brainard – dobro
- Makinsey Rosser – background vocals
- Taylor Grace – background vocals

Technical

- Mark Neill – production
- Lee Dyess – engineering, mastering

Visuals

- Alice Maule – artwork
- Bobby Cochran – photography

== Charts ==
Chart performance for Music City USA
Chart (2021)	Peak position
US Heatseekers Albums	10
