= Clovis (album) =

Studio album by Charley Crockett
- Released: April 28, 2026
- Recorded: March 21–26, 2026
- Studio: Norman Petty Recording Studios (Clovis)
- Genre: Country
- Length: 54:39
- Labels: $10 Cowboy; Atlantic (re-release)
- Producers: Charley Crockett; Shooter Jennings

Charley Crockett chronology
Age of the Ram (2026)	Clovis (2026)

Clovis is the seventeenth studio album by Charley Crockett, released on $10 Cowboy through TuneCore on Spotify on April 28, 2026, and on all platforms on May 1, 2026. The album was pulled from circulation on May 5, 2026, and was re-released on July 3, 2026, through Atlantic Outpost.

== Background ==
The album serves as a return to form for Crockett, as a departure from major label Island Records, and back to his roots as an independent artist. Crockett, from 2014 to 2024, released albums on his imprint, Son of Davy, and starting in 2025, for his Sagebrush Trilogy, switched to the Lone Star Rider moniker.

== Recording ==
The album was recorded at Norman Petty Recording Studios in Clovis, New Mexico in 6 days during March 21–26, 2026.

The album served as the first recordings made at Norman Petty Recording Studios since LeAnn Rimes' 1994 album All That. Before then the last recordings in the studio were made in 1967 for The Fireballs' single Bottle of Wine.

On July 11, 2026, Shooter revealed that Crockett and his entire band, as well as Shooter himself, recorded the entire album while sick with COVID-19, which Shooter would later dub "Clovid". Post production began at Sunset Sound Studio 3 on Crockett's birthday on March 24, and lasted approximately two days.

=== Production ===
Shooter Jennings produced the album, his fourth album produced for Crockett, with Crockett co-producing once again. Crockett stated on May 1, 2026 that he spent about $300,000 making the album.

== Release ==
The album was released on Spotify on April 28, 2026, through TuneCore and later released on all other platforms on May 1, 2026.

== Island Records dispute ==
On May 7, 2026, the album was removed from streaming platforms. This removal was followed by an Instagram post by Crockett stating "Please Stand By". On June 4, 2026, he said he could not distribute the album personally due to legal issues.

Following Island's decision to pull the record, Charley had a street team show up to CMA Fest on June 5, 2026, and hand out CDs of the album for free to anybody passing by on Broadway Street. After passing them out at CMA Fest he would start handing them out for free at every show he has played since for fans in attendance.

== Rerelease ==
On June 29, 2026, Crockett announced that the album would finally be put back into circulation on July 3, 2026, in time for America's 250th Birthday on the Fourth of July weekend via Atlantic Outpost.

== Track listing ==
Clovis track listing
No.	Title	Writer(s)	Length
1.	"The Hallelujah Trail"	Charley Crockett; Shooter Jennings	4:48
2.	"Down by Law"	Crockett; Jennings	3:48
3.	"One Eyed Jack"	Crockett; Jennings; Kyle Madrigal	4:39
4.	"Image of a Woman"	Crockett	3:41
5.	"Eagle and the Crow"	Crockett; Jennings; Jay Moeller	3:32
6.	"Top Hand"	Crockett; Jennings; Taylor Grace	3:28
7.	"Country Music"	Crockett; Jennings	4:14
8.	"Last Night at the Alamo"	Crockett; Jennings; Grace; Moeller	3:06
9.	"Clovis"	Stephen Barber	4:16
10.	"Don't Take Your Guns to Town"	Johnny Cash	3:42
11.	"Albuquerque Lights"	Crockett; Jennings	3:28
12.	"I Ain't Riding Anymore"	Crockett; Jennings; Moeller	3:50
13.	"Honky Tonk Philosophy"	Crockett; Jennings; Grace; Moeller	3:43
14.	"Waylon Rides Again"	Crockett; Jennings	4:11
Total length:			54:39

== Personnel ==
Credits adapted from Spotify.

=== Musicians ===
- Charley Crockett – vocals, electric guitar, acoustic guitar
- Kullen Fox – organ, clavinet, wurlitzer, trumpet, piano, acoustic guitar, percussion, backing vocals
- Nathan Fleming – pedal steel, dobro
- Alexis Sanchez – electric guitar, acoustic guitar
- Mario Valdez – drums (2, 6, 10-11, 14), percussion, backing vocals
- Jay Moeller – drums (1, 3-5, 7-8, 12-13)
- Kyle Madrigal – bass, synth bass, synthesizer, acoustic guitar, percussion, backing vocals
- David Spreng – backing vocals
- Shooter Jennings – organ, celeste keyboard, synthesizer, electric guitar, acoustic guitar, backing vocals
- Jack Montesinos – electric guitar, acoustic guitar
- David Leroy Biller – electric guitar, acoustic guitar, sitar
- Marc Macisso – bass, harmonica, jaw harp
- Stephen Barber – string arranger
- Suzie Katayama – string orchestra

=== Technical and visuals ===
- Charley Crockett – production
- Shooter Jennings – production, mixing
- David Spreng – engineer, mixing, recording
- Nate Haessly – engineer
- Charlie Daniels – assistant engineer
- George Janho – assistant engineer
- Ron Skinner – assistant engineer
- Pete Lyman – mastering
- Jared L. Christopher – photography

== Charts ==
Chart performance for Clovis
Chart (2026)	Peak position
US Top Album Sales (Billboard)	37
