= $10 Cowboy =

2024 album by Charley Crockett

Studio album by Charley Crockett
- Released: April 26, 2024
- Studios: Arlyn, Austin, Texas
- Genre: Neotraditional country
- Length: 39:43
- Labels: Son of Davy; Thirty Tigers
- Producers: Charley Crockett; Billy Horton

Charley Crockett chronology
Live from the Ryman (2023)	$10 Cowboy (2024)	Visions of Dallas (2024)

Singles from $10 Cowboy
- 1. "$10 Cowboy" Released: January 22, 2024; 2. "Hard Luck & Circumstances" Released: March 8, 2024; 3. "Solitary Road" Released: April 5, 2024

$10 Cowboy is the twelfth album by American singer Charley Crockett, released on April 26, 2024, through Son of Davy and distributed by Thirty Tigers. It was produced by Crockett and Billy Horton. The album received positive reviews from critics, and was nominated for the Grammy Award for Best Americana Album, Crockett's first nomination.

== Background ==
In August 2025 Crockett revealed that the album was initially intended to be a double album, however Thirty Tigers did not like the idea and ended up splitting it into two albums with $10 Cowboy and Visions of Dallas.

== Critical reception ==
Professional ratings
Aggregate scores
Source	Rating
Metacritic	85/100
Review scores
Source	Rating
AllMusic	4.5/5 stars
Paste	7.8/10
Spin	B+

$10 Cowboy received a score of 85 out of 100 on review aggregator Metacritic based on five critics' reviews, which the website categorized as "universal acclaim". Rachel Rascoe of The Austin Chronicle called it "ruminative, less hooky, but still a recognizable play in the Austin-area singer's traditional and soul country mix" and felt that it "slots like an exploratory studio in-betweener among Crockett's comprehensive catalog". Spin's Stephen Deusner concluded that "rather than a throwback or a neo-neo-traditionalist, he just sounds like a guy singing his sad, sad songs to the huddled masses".

Stephen Thomas Erlewine of AllMusic wrote that while Crockett's "approach" may be similar to its predecessor The Man from Waco (2022), the album "feels considerably different thanks to the troubadour swapping country for soul as the album's connective tissue". Ben Salmon, reviewing the album for Paste, found that the album "sounds remarkably warm and alive and real; it feels like you can step on the bass lines, put the twinkling piano notes in your pocket or reach out and touch the pedal steel guitar parts". Glide Magazine's Jim Hynes stated that the musicians recording live to tape "feels like a live performance" and Crockett "remains squarely in the front row of today's best writers". John Amen of No Depression praised the album, writing, "Occurring as a cross between Hank Williams, a low-key carnival announcer, and the Coen brothers' Buster Scruggs, Crockett has perfected his craft: $10 Cowboy is a 2024 standout."

== Track listing ==
$10 Cowboy track listing
No.	Title	Writer(s)	Length
1.	"$10 Cowboy"	Charley Crockett; Billy Horton	3:35
2.	"America"	Crockett; Horton	3:23
3.	"Hard Luck & Circumstances"	Crockett	3:04
4.	"Good at Losing"	Crockett; Horton	3:44
5.	"Gettin' Tired Again"	Crockett	2:50
6.	"Spade"	Crockett	3:29
7.	"Diamond in the Rough"	Crockett; Kullen Fuchs; Horton	3:18
8.	"Ain't Done Losing Yet"	Crockett; Taylor Grace; Horton; Jay Moeller	3:18
9.	"Solitary Road"	Crockett; Horton	3:31
10.	"City of Roses"	Crockett; Fuchs; Andrew Trube	3:36
11.	"Lead the Way"	Crockett; Anthony Farrell	3:58
12.	"Midnight Cowboy"	Country Willie Edwards (William Neal Edwards III)	2:57
Total length:			39:43

== Personnel ==
Musicians

- Charley Crockett – lead vocals, acoustic guitar
- Chris Bishop – electric guitar
- Ames Asbell – viola
- Rick Brotherton – acoustic guitar, classical guitar
- Lauren Cervantes – background vocals
- Jeff Dazey – saxophone
- Nathan Fleming – steel guitar
- Seula Lee – violin
- Angela Miller – background vocals
- Sara Nelson – cello
- Tracy Seeger – violin

Technical

- Charley Crockett – production
- Billy Horton – production
- Lee Dyess – mastering
- Mark Neill – mixing
- Jacob Sciba – engineering
- David Boyle – assistance
- Noah Nunez – assistance

Visuals

- Micah Givens – artwork
- Jackie Lee Young – photography
- Ryan Vestil – photography

== Charts ==
Chart performance for $10 Cowboy
Chart (2024)	Peak position
Australian Physical Albums (ARIA)	78
Scottish Albums (Official Charts)	74
UK Country Albums (Official Charts)	3
UK Record Store (OCC)	13
US Billboard 200	168
US Top Country Albums (Billboard)	30

== Film ==
$10 Cowboy
- Release poster
- Directed by: Patrick Heaphy
- Produced by: Son of Davy; LCM247
- Starring: Charley Crockett; Taylor Day Grace; The Blue Drifters
- Music by: Charley Crockett; Shooter Jennings; Waylon Jennings; Jessi Colter
- Distributed by: LCM247
- Release date: October 24, 2025 (Austin Film Festival)
- Running time: 75 minutes
- Country: United States
- Language: English

$10 Cowboy is a 2025 documentary starring Charley Crockett following the release of his April 2024 album, $10 Cowboy.

The film follows Crockett, his wife and fellow singer Taylor Day Grace, as well as his band The Blue Drifters as they embark on the first leg of his $10 Cowboy Tour at the start of 2024. The film features numerous on-the-fly interviews of Crockett, backstage footage, as well as concert recordings that connect Charley with his past growing up poor in trailer parks into his start as an itinerant then with his present of being a big name and outlier in the country music industry.

The film initially started out as content meant for Crockett's social media, as well as supportive material for the $10 Cowboy's album rollout.

The film would premiere at the Austin Film Festival on October 24, 2025, then showing once at the Bullock IMAX Theatre, with a theatrical release planned but not yet officially announced, likely slated for a 2026 release date. In August 2025 Crockett explained in an interview with Ward Guenther that he had intended on releasing the film during the initial rollout and record cycle for his $10 Cowboy album, in mid-2024, but experienced issues with distribution.
