= Lil' G.L.'s Honky Tonk Jubilee =

2017 album by Charley Crockett

Studio album by Charley Crockett
- Released: May 5, 2017
- Genre: Country
- Length: 43:15
- Labels: Son of Davy; Thirty Tigers
- Producers: Charley Crockett; Billy Horton; Jay Moeller

Charley Crockett chronology
In the Night (2016)	Lil' G.L.'s Honky Tonk Jubilee (2017)	Lonesome as a Shadow (2018)

Alternative cover
- Reissue cover

Lil' G.L.'s Honky Tonk Jubilee is the third studio album by Charley Crockett, released on Son of Davy on September 8, 2017. The album served as the first installment in the Lil' G.L. series of albums released by Crockett.

== Background ==
Coming off the heels of In the Night which blended much of Charley's blues influence with his country influence, Charley dove headfirst into the genre on the record. The album featured 16 tracks, all being covers of country standards from the likes of Roy Acuff, Hank Williams, Ernest Tubb, Loretta Lynn, Webb Pierce, among others.

== Track listing ==
Lil' G.L.'s Honky Tonk Jubilee track listing
No.	Title	Writer(s)	Length
1.	"Night Train to Memphis"	Beasley Smith; Marvin Hughes; Owen Bradley	2:19
2.	"Jamestown Ferry"	Bobby Borchers; Mack Vickery	3:06
3.	"I Saw the Light"	Hank Williams	3:04
4.	"Honky Tonk Blues"	Williams	2:14
5.	"Just a Drink Away"	Billy Parker; Bobby Lewis	2:52
6.	"Ramblin Man"	Williams	3:04
7.	"You Must Be Drunk Again"	Brennen Leigh; John Scott Sherrill	2:24
8.	"I Ain't Never"	Mel Tillis; Webb Pierce	2:15
9.	"The Lost Highway"	Leon Payne	3:05
10.	"Am I That Easy to Forget"	Carl Belew; W.S. Stevenson; Shelby Singleton	2:36
11.	"Honky Tonk Man"	Loretta Lynn	2:13
12.	"You're Still on My Mind"	Luke McDaniel	2:32
13.	"I Just Don't Like This Kind of Living"	Williams	2:32
14.	"Brothers of a Bottle"	Payne	2:48
15.	"Honky Tonkin'"	Williams	2:56
16.	"I Cast a Lonesome Shadow"	Hank Thompson; Lynn Russwurm	3:06
Total length:			43:15

== Personnel ==
Musicians

- Charley Crockett – lead vocals, acoustic guitar
- Nathan Fleming - pedal steel
- Jay Moeller - drums, percussion
- Simon Flory - upright bass
- Dave Biller - lead guitar, rhythm guitar, pedal steel
- Brennen Leigh - backing vocals, mandolin
- T. Jarrod Bonta - piano
- Ian Stewart - fiddle

Technical

- Charley Crockett – production
- Billy Horton - co-producer
- Jay Moeller - co-producer
- Jim Wilson - mastering

Visuals

- Lyza Renee - photography
- Ben Christensen - photography
- Pigs Fly Studios – artwork
