= Lil' G.L. Presents: Jukebox Charley =

2022 album by Charley Crockett

Studio album by Charley Crockett
- Released: April 22, 2022
- Recorded: 2021–2022
- Studios: Fort Horton Studios, Wyldwood, Texas
- Genre: Country
- Labels: Son of Davy; Thirty Tigers
- Producer: Billy Horton

Charley Crockett chronology
Music City USA (2021)	Lil' G.L. Presents: Jukebox Charley (2022)	The Man from Waco (2022)

Singles from Lil' G.L. Presents: Jukebox Charley
- 1. "I Feel for You" Released: March 6, 2022

Lil' G.L. Presents: Jukebox Charley is the tenth studio album by American singer Charley Crockett, released on April 22, 2022, through Son of Davy and distributed by Thirty Tigers. The album is the final installment so far in Crockett's Lil. G.L. series of albums.

== Background ==
Produced alongside longtime producer, Billy Horton, at his Fort Horton Studios, Crockett once again tackled various obscure songs by many giants in the country music world, learned in his time on street corners across the globe. The album would feature a whole host of covers ranging from Jerry Reed, Tom T. Hall, Roger Miller, Willie Nelson, Johnny Paycheck, Porter Wagoner, George Jones, and many others.

== Track listing ==
Lil' G.L. Presents: Jukebox Charley track listing
No.	Title	Writer(s)	Length
1.	"Make Way For a Better Man"	Cy Coben	2:39
2.	"I Feel for You"	Jerry Reed	3:03
3.	"Lonely in Person"	Tom T. Hall	2:55
4.	"Diamond Joe"	Public Domain	2:40
5.	"Where Have All the Honest People Gone"	Dennis Linde	3:02
6.	"Home Motel"	Willie Nelson	2:31
7.	"Jukebox Charley"	Aubrey Mayhew; Johnny Paycheck	2:32
8.	"I Hope It Rains at My Funeral"	Hall	3:37
9.	"Heartbreak Affair"	Kay Adams	2:10
10.	"Battle with the Bottle"	Joe Avants Jr.; Johnny Koonse	2:49
11.	"Out of Control"	Darrell Edwards; George Jones; Herbie Treece	2:49
12.	"Six Foot Under"	Clint Lewis; James Hutchins	2:24
13.	"Same Old Situation"	Bill McDonald; Wayne Kemp	3:27
14.	"Between My House and Town"	Sanger D. Shafer	2:34

== Personnel ==
Musicians

- Charley Crockett – lead vocals, acoustic guitar
- Nathan Fleming – pedal steel
- Mario Valdez – drums
- Billy Horton – electric bass, upright bass, acoustic guitar, backing vocals
- Bobby Horton – acoustic guitar, harpsichord, organ, xylophone
- Jason Moeller – drums
- Colin Colby – acoustic guitar
- Mike Molnar – acoustic guitar
- Tjarko Jeen – electric guitar
- Dave Biller – electric guitar
- Ted Roddy – harmonica
- T Jarrod Bonta – piano
- Doug Strahan – resonator
- Doug James – saxophone
- John Schattenberg – violin, viola
- Sarah Lee Guthrie – backing vocals
- Jenn Miori Hodges – backing vocals, whistling

Technical

- Billy Horton – production
- Jim Wilson – mastering
- Jeff Powell – lacquer cut

Visuals

- Alice Maule – artwork
- Bobby Cochran – photography

== Charts ==
Chart performance for Lil' G.L. Presents: Jukebox Charley
Chart (2022)	Peak position
UK Americana Albums (Official Charts)	31
