= Charley Crockett =

American country musician (born 1984)

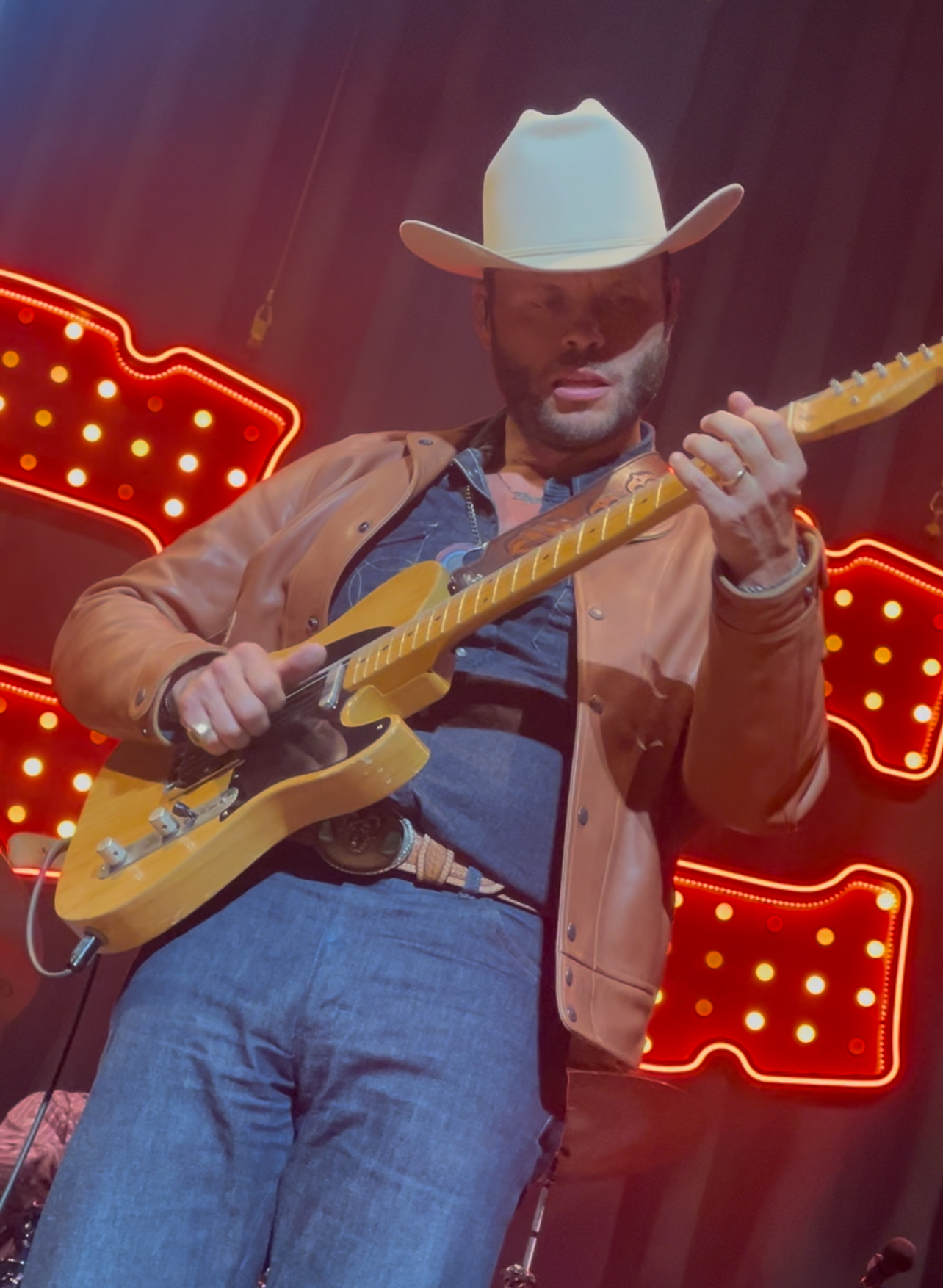
- Crockett performing at The Classic Center on April 23, 2025

Background information
- Also known as: Lil' G.L.; $10 Cowboy; The Hardest Working Man in Country Music
- Born: Matthew Charles Crockett; March 24, 1984 (age 42); San Benito, Texas, U.S.
- Genres: Neotraditional Country; blues; southern soul; Americana
- Occupations: Singer; songwriter; musician; producer; actor
- Instruments: Vocals; guitar; banjo; piano; sitar
- Works: Albums; singles
- Years active: 2001–present
- Labels: Son of Davy/Lone Star Rider/$10 Cowboy; Field Day Records; Thirty Tigers; Island; Atlantic Outpost
- Member of: the Blue Drifters
- Formerly of: Train Robbers
- Spouse: Taylor Grace (m. 2024)
- Website: charleycrockett.com

Matthew Charles "Charley" Crockett (born March 24, 1984) is an American traditional country music singer, songwriter, musician, record producer, and actor. He has released 23 projects, including 17 studio albums since 2014, and been given the label The Hardest Working Man in Country Music, having released more music than any other country musician in the 2020s so far. As of 2026, Crockett has released 222 songs within the current decade.

== Early life ==
Charley was born in San Benito, Texas, to Branton "Brant" Eddens Crockett and Jan Onda Applehans. Crockett's paternal grandfather was a chemical engineer and rancher, Charles Hayes "Charlie" Crockett Sr. (1925–2019), and his paternal great grandfather was Texas senator George Clark Purl Sr. (1892–1943). His mother is of Volga German descent. His third great-grandfather was Jacob Goodwin Crockett of New Hampshire. Crockett is also the nephew of Cotton Bowl Classic Hall of Famer and former Texas Longhorns defensive back Tom Campbell, through his father's second marriage.

Raised by a single mother with an older brother and sister, Crockett grew up in a trailer park in Los Fresnos, Texas. He has claimed to be a descendant of Davy Crockett, mixed-race, and Jewish. His mother relocated the family to Dallas, and Crockett spent the summer months with his uncle, who lived in the French Quarter of New Orleans.

== Career ==
=== 2001–2011: Start as an itinerant ===
Upon leaving high school at the age of 17, Crockett decided to travel with his guitar acquired by his mother from a pawn shop. Crockett noted, "I taught myself how to play and started to write songs immediately, without any chord knowledge or anything. I didn't know what key I was in for 12 years, but my ear was really good, and I could play in any key and any chord. I just didn't know what it was." His early musical influences came from hearing hip hop, and he became fascinated with the samples used. Crockett said, "I got into Curtis Mayfield through samples of his songs by other artists, and Nina Simone was through a sample. Even J. Cole, I was listening to a song of his ("Kenny Lofton"), and it was based on the sample from the Manhattans version of 'Hurt'".

Crockett played music on the streets in the French Quarter of New Orleans and in Deep Ellum, Dallas, as a teenager. Later, he traveled further afield by hitchhiking and riding freight trains, and by 2009, he was busking in New York City. As he improved his performance skills, Crockett organized a street band called the Trainrobbers, which caught the attention of a Manhattan-based representative for Sony Music, Nell Mulderry. She signed the 26-year-old Crockett to a two-year management contract, although he rejected a publishing deal. Eventually tired of life on the streets and the pending expiration of the contract, Crockett relocated to Northern California, where he combined working on farms and communes with performing for three more years. Crockett then existed on the streets in Paris, France, for a year, and briefly lived in Spain and Morocco.

=== 2015–2024: Independent releases ===
In 2015, Crockett returned to Texas and after settling in Dallas, self-released his debut album, A Stolen Jewel, in May. He recorded the album with friend Kyle Madrigal in the loft of a barn in Northern California on a farm the pair worked at, whilst the owner was away for the winter. It landed him the Dallas Observer Music Award for Best Blues Act. The lo-fi collection contained a cover of the Flying Burrito Brothers' "Juanita". Crockett also befriended Leon Bridges at this time, before Crockett released a blues-dominated album, In The Night, in 2016. In The Night contained a selection of Crockett-penned numbers, along with a cover of his hometown hero Freddy Fender's "Wasted Days and Wasted Nights", as well as Jerry Lee Lewis' 1968 hit, "What's Made Milwaukee Famous". Fort Worth Star-Telegram called In the Night "an impressive calling card, full of Crockett's plaintive soulfulness and swinging tempos". Crockett spent the next year touring to promote his work, playing over 125 shows in total. He toured with the Turnpike Troubadours, Lucero, Shinyribs, Samantha Fish, and Old 97's, among others.

After relocating to Austin, Texas, Crockett's next release was a collection of covers of country songs, Lil' G.L.'s Honky Tonk Jubilee (2017), which was issued on Thirty Tigers. Tracks included the Roy Acuff-penned "Night Train to Memphis", Tanya Tucker’s "The Jamestown Ferry", and Hank Williams' "Honky Tonkin'", all incorporating Crockett's clipped, hiccuped Texan drawl. Other tracks on the album were originally recorded by Ernest Tubb, Loretta Lynn, and Webb Pierce ("I Ain't Never").

In 2018, he released Lonesome as a Shadow, a collection of purely original songs. It was recorded at Sam C. Phillips Recording Studio in Memphis, Tennessee, and produced by Matt Ross-Spang. The opening track, "I Wanna Cry", was written for his sister, Brandi, who had died from a methamphetamine overdose. The album was dedicated to Henry "Ragtime Texas" Thomas. Following its April release date, Crockett toured again backed by his band the Blue Drifters. His dates included venues such as the House of Blues in Houston, Washington, DC's 9:30 Club, The Mint in Los Angeles, and The Fillmore in San Francisco. In addition, he performed at festivals such as the Wheatland Music Festival, Portland, Oregon's Pickathon, and Austin City Limits Music Festival.

In late 2018, Crockett issued Lil' G.L.'s Blue Bonanza. Crockett noted, "Lil G.L. is my side name, like Hank [Williams] had Luke the Drifter. I use it for all my side projects and cover projects." He explained the moniker was given to him by a local blues drummer, Jay Moeller, in reference to the obscure rhythm and blues singer G. L. Crockett. AllMusic stated "Lil G.L.'s Blue Bonanza is a companion of sorts to Charley Crockett's 2017 Lil G.L.'s Honky Tonk Jubilee". The album was primarily another compilation of cover versions, although Crockett's definition of the blues encompasses tracks including Jimmy Reed's "Bright Lights, Big City", Tom T. Hall's "That's How I Got to Memphis", and Danny O'Keefe's "Good Time Charlie's Got the Blues". In addition, Crockett covered work by Ernest Tubb, George Jones, and T-Bone Walker. Lil G.L.'s Blue Bonanza peaked at number 10 in the Billboard Blues Albums chart.

Crockett released The Valley on September 20, 2019. The album features the single "Borrowed Time", which was co-written with Evan Felker of Turnpike Troubadours.

Field Recordings, Vol. 1 was released on April 3, 2020, and is a mixtape of 30 low-fidelity covers and originals recorded in Mendocino County, California. Crockett and Kyle Madrigal recorded the collection over the previous year using a four-track recorder, an old CB radio microphone, and an old rotary telephone. Crockett said the songs came "from my street stuff and folk tunes, stuff I wrote that might not necessarily be best for these studio albums".

Crockett released his seventh album, Welcome to Hard Times, on July 31, 2020. It was produced by Mark Neill and includes songwriting contributions from The Black Keys' Dan Auerbach and singer/songwriter Pat McLaughlin. The album followed a life-threatening health scare in which he was diagnosed with a congenital heart condition that required heart surgery. It received glowing reviews, including from American Songwriter, who stated, "Crockett finds the sweet spot between country, soul, blues, and folk on deceptively modest songs, effortless in their easy-going groove", while Texas Monthly stated, "Crockett makes a beeline for the album's central theme: wily survival in a socially, politically, and economically rigged system."

On February 26, 2021, Crockett released his next album, titled 10 for Slim: Charley Crockett Sings James Hand, a tribute album to James "Slim" Hand. It was met with critical acclaim from Rolling Stone, The Boot, Austin American-Statesman, Forbes, and American Songwriter among others.

Crockett released his ninth album, Music City USA, on September 17, 2021 via Son of Davy/Thirty Tigers. The lead single, "I Need Your Love", was featured on Rolling Stone as well as Brooklyn Vegan, who called it "a sweet and sultry slice of southern soul" and The Boot, who named it "a dose of horn-filled soul". Later that month, he earned the 2021 Emerging Artist of the Year award at the Americana Music Honors and Awards in Nashville. Crockett closed out the year with his debut on Austin City Limits, which aired in October on PBS. He followed that up a few months later with an appearance on CBS This Morning's "Saturday Sessions", performing "I Need Your Love", "Music City USA", and "I Feel for You" from Music City USA.

In March 2022, he announced Jukebox Charley, a new album of cover songs and his third album release in just over a year. The fourth installment of his Lil' G.L. covers series, the album was released on April 22 and featured country tunes from Tom T. Hall, Willie Nelson, George Jones, and more.

In September 2022, Crockett released his 11th album, and his first concept album, with The Man from Waco, featuring 14 original songs. Crockett performed on Jimmy Kimmel Live! on December 9, 2022.

In February 2023, Crockett performed at NPR for a Tiny Desk Concert. It was followed by an appearance on Comedy Central's The Daily Show in April, where he was interviewed by the host Jordan Klepper, along with a live performance of "Name on a Billboard" from his 2022 album, The Man from Waco. Later that summer, he was on the cover of Texas Monthly, for a lengthy profile detailing the artist's background and rise to fame. In September, he released Live from the Ryman, an album and concert film of his sold-out headline debut at Nashville's Ryman Auditorium recorded on November 14, 2022. He was also the 2023 recipient of the Stephen Bruton Award at the Lone Star Film Festival, which celebrates exceptional artists whose careers are anchored not only in music, but also include artistic expression in film.

In early 2024, Crockett announced that his album $10 Cowboy would be released on April 26. He celebrated this with another appearance on Jimmy Kimmel Live!, where he performed the album's title track. In July 2024, Crockett released Visions of Dallas, an album of six cover songs and six originals, billed as chapter two to $10 Cowboy.

=== 2025: First major label deal, Island Records releases ===
In January 2025, Crockett signed with Island Records, and released his first album via the label, Lonesome Drifter, on March 14. The album included 12 tracks, co-produced with Shooter Jennings, including a new version of his cover of "The Jamestown Ferry" and a cover of George Strait's "Amarillo by Morning". In June 2025 Crockett would announce two additional records would be coming while on The Joe Rogan Experience; the first being a studio album Dollar a Day, which would drop August 8, 2025, and the second being a live album from his performance at the 2025 Houston Livestock Show and Rodeo on March 17, 2025, which featured over 50,000 in attendance for the performance, slated for a late 2025 or early 2026 release. He also announced the production of a movie he filmed in 2024 based around the $10 Cowboy album, with the film being of the same name, however, he left it up in the air as to whether it would be released or not.

On August 19, 2025, Crockett posted on Instagram about his frustrations with the double standards of the industry, calling out the hypocrisy of many who criticized Beyoncé's attempt to jump into the genre but remained silent during the past two decades about the pop music being injected into the genre through the bro country era with artists like Morgan Wallen. The post went viral and quickly garnered widespread media attention from outlets like Billboard and quickly received a shot on Twitter the same day from Gavin Adcock, who called him a "cosplay cowboy". On August 21, 2025, Crockett sent Adcock a copy of Dollar A Day as well as five dozen roses in an attempt to make amends, as they were both nearby in back-to-back nights. Adcock posted a response, sarcastically accepting the album and roses while falsely claiming that Crockett did not sell enough tickets and was forced to move down the street the night before. Crockett's show was actually rescheduled from a May date due to inclement weather, not a lack of ticket sales, as Crockett played to a sold-out concert crowd at a larger venue than the one originally planned. Crockett acknowledged the "cosplay cowboy" comment through a public social media post on February 8, 2026, wherein he also addressed his feelings on the current presidential administration as well as his feelings about immigration and classism in the United States.

On November 7, 2025 Crockett would be nominated for a Grammy once again. This time he would be nominated for the inaugural crowning of the Grammy Award for Best Traditional Country Album for his album Dollar a Day alongside Lukas Nelson, Willie Nelson, Zach Top, and Margo Price. A little over a week later Charley would take to social media, writing an open letter to The Recording Academy asking for his nomination to be given to the Turnpike Troubadours for their 2025 album The Price of Admission.

Age of the Ram, the third installment in his Sagebrush album trilogy, released on April 3, 2026.

=== 2026: Return to being an independent artist ===
Following a 3 run series of albums from 2025–2026 for Island Records, Crockett would surprise release Clovis on April 28, 2026, a little over 3 weeks after the conclusion of his Sagebrush Trilogy of albums with Age of the Ram. The record would mark his first independent release since 2024's Visions of Dallas and his first fully independent, with no major distribution deal since 2016's In the Night.

On May 7, the record was pulled from release due to a contract dispute between Crockett and his former label, Island Records. Crockett in protest would start handing out CDs of the album for free at CMA Fest on June 5, and do the same at all of his concerts shortly thereafter.

On June 29, Crockett announced the record would return on July 3, 2026 in time for America's 250th Birthday after signing a distribution deal with Atlantic Records through their Atlantic Outpost imprint.

On July 9, 2026, Crockett confirmed via a statement to Rolling Stone that he had removed opening act Twin Temple from his Age of the Ram Tour due to their Satanic imagery.

== Personal life ==
On New Year's Day 2020 Crockett began dating Taylor Grace, a fellow musician, after running into each other at The White Horse Saloon. They first met at Antone's in Austin, Texas at the end of 2018. They became engaged in January 2023 and they married in July 2024 at Willie Nelson's Luck Ranch in Spicewood, Texas.

=== Health issues ===
In January 2019, Crockett nearly died on his tour bus, which was formerly Willie Nelson's "The Redheaded Stranger", and had to undergo open-heart surgery. Pre-assessments for the surgery showed that Crockett had a congenital heart condition where his heart had two out of three aortic valve flaps fused together, which caused Wolff–Parkinson–White syndrome. Surgeons placed a new valve in his heart that was obtained from a cow.

=== Legal issues ===
In March 2016, Crockett was convicted in Virginia for a August 2014 charge for possession of cannabis. He was denied entry into Canada in February 2026 due to the conviction, forcing him to cancel his planned tour in the country.

=== Political views ===
On February 8, 2026, Crockett took to Instagram, to criticize U.S. President Donald Trump, referring to him as a "grifter", and called for the deportation of Trump allies Elon Musk and Peter Thiel, going on to state "I truly believe this isn't a left or right issue. There's something else happening here."

== Discography ==
- Get Up Outa Texas (2014)
- A Stolen Jewel (2015)
- In the Night (2016)
- Daytrotter Session (2016)
- Lil' G.L.'s Honky Tonk Jubilee (2017)
- Lonesome as a Shadow (2018)
- Lil' G.L.'s Blue Bonanza (2018)
- The Valley (2019)
- OurVinyl Sessions (2020)
- Field Recordings, Vol. 1 (2020)
- Welcome to Hard Times (2020)
- 10 for Slim: Charley Crockett Sings James Hand (2021)
- Music City USA (2021)
- Lil' G.L. Presents: Jukebox Charley (2022)
- The Man from Waco (2022)
- The Man from Waco (Redux) (2023)
- Live from the Ryman (2023)
- $10 Cowboy (2024)
- Visions of Dallas (2024)
- Lonesome Drifter (2025)
- Dollar a Day (2025)
- Age of the Ram (2026)
- Clovis (2026)

== Tours ==
=== Headlining ===
- The Honky Tonk Jubilee Tour (2017)
- Jukebox Charley Tour (2022)
- The Man from Waco Tour (2022–2023)
- The $10 Cowboy Tour (2024)
- The Lonesome Drifter Tour (2025)
- The Crooner and The Cowboy Tour (2025) (with Leon Bridges)
- Age of the Ram Tour (2026)

== Filmography ==
Film
Year	Title	Role	Notes
2021	The Road To Music City USA	Himself	Documentary surrounding the recording of his 2021 album Music City USA.
2023	Live from the Ryman	Himself	Concert film.
2025	Broke	Snowplow Driver	First feature film role, end scene
2025	Highway 99: A Double Album	Himself	Documentary surrounding the career of Merle Haggard.
2025	$10 Cowboy	Himself	Documentary surrounding the release of his 2024 album $10 Cowboy.
2026	A Cowboy in London	Himself	Documentary surrounding the UK leg of his $10 Cowboy Tour in May 2024.
2026	Texas Music Revolution	Himself	Documentary surrounding the 25th anniversary of the Texas Music Revolution festival in 2021.

Television
Year	Title	Role	Notes
2021–2025	Austin City Limits	Himself	Musical guest 2 episodes
2022–2024	CBS Mornings	Himself	Musical guest 2 episodes
2022	Jimmy Kimmel Live!	Himself	Musical guest
2023	The Daily Show	Himself	Musical guest
2025	The Tonight Show Starring Jimmy Fallon	Himself	Musical guest
2025	Ransom Canyon	Himself	First television role S1:E3

== Awards and nominations ==
Award	Year	Category	Album/Song	Result	Ref.
Americana Music Honors & Awards	2021	Emerging Artist of the Year	N/A	Won	
Americana Music Honors & Awards	2023	Artist of the Year	N/A	Nominated	
Americana Music Honors & Awards	2023	Album of the Year	The Man from Waco	Nominated	
Americana Music Honors & Awards	2023	Song of the Year	'I'm Just a Clown'	Nominated	
Austin Music Awards	2022	Musician of the Year	N/A	Won	
Austin Music Awards	2022	Best Country Artist	N/A	Won	
Austin Music Awards	2026	Best Country Artist	N/A	Won	
Grammy Awards	2025	Best Americana Album	Lonesome Drifter	Nominated	
Grammy Awards	2026	Best Regional Roots Music Album	A Tribute to the King of Zydeco	Won	
Grammy Awards	2026	Best Traditional Country Album	Dollar a Day	Nominated	
