= Lil' G.L.'s Blue Bonanza =

2018 album by Charley Crockett

Studio album by Charley Crockett
- Released: December 7, 2018
- Recorded: 2018
- Studio: Fort Horton (Wyldwood)
- Genres: Blues; country
- Length: 39:36
- Labels: Son of Davy; Thirty Tigers
- Producers: Charley Crockett; Billy Horton

Charley Crockett chronology
Lonesome as a Shadow (2018)	Lil' G.L.'s Blue Bonanza (2018)	The Valley (2019)

Lil' G.L.'s Blue Bonanza is the fifth studio album by Charley Crockett, released on Son of Davy on December 7, 2018. The album was the second installment in the Lil' G.L. series of Crockett's albums.

== Background ==
The album was the second in his Lil' G.L. series of albums, and followed the series' trend of covering some of Crockett's favorite country and blues songs. As the title implied, the album was a much more blues heavy sound, although retaining some of its country influence featuring covers of T-Bone Walker, Charles Brown, Jimmy Reed, George Jones, Tom T. Hall, among many others.

== Track listing ==
Lil' G.L.'s Blue Bonanza track listing
No.	Title	Writer(s)	Length
1.	"Here Am I"	Chuck Norris	2:44
2.	"That's How I Got to Memphis"	Tom T. Hall	3:01
3.	"It's a Man Down There"	G. L. Crockett; Jack Daniels	2:35
4.	"Travelin' Blues"	Willie "Scare Crow" Owens	2:50
5.	"Good Time Charley's Got the Blues"	Danny O'Keefe	3:12
6.	"Trouble Blues"	Charles Brown	3:02
7.	"The Race is On"	Don Rollins	2:08
8.	"Burn Another Honky Tonk Down"	George Jones	2:38
9.	"Lots of Luck"	Eddie Miller	2:46
10.	"Servant of Love"	Norman Walton	1:51
11.	"Bright Lights, Big City"	Jimmy Reed	2:36
12.	"A Dime at a Time"	Dottie Bruce; Jerry Chesnut	2:06
13.	"T-Bone Shuffle"	T-Bone Walker	1:59
14.	"Saturday Satan Sunday Saint"	Wayne P. Walker	2:45
15.	"Lead Me On"	Lavelle White; Deadric Malone	3:23
Total length:			39:36

== Personnel ==
Musicians

- Charley Crockett – lead vocals, acoustic guitar, electric guitar
- Kullen Fox - wurlitzer, accordion, trumpet, banjo, backing vocals
- Alexis Sanchez - electric guitar
- Mario Valdez - drums, percussion
- Nathan Fleming - pedal steel
- Colin Colby - upright bass
- Simon Flory - bass
- Dave Biller - lead guitar, rhythm guitar
- Brennen Leigh - mandolin

Technical

- Charley Crockett – production
- Billy Horton - production
- Jim Wilson - mastering

Visuals

- Cal Quinn - photography
- Field Day Records – artwork

== Charts ==
Chart performance for Lil' G.L.'s Blue Bonanza
Chart (2019)	Peak position
US Top Blues Albums	11
US Heatseekers Albums	10
