= 10 for Slim: Charley Crockett Sings James Hand =

2021 album by Charley Crockett

Studio album by Charley Crockett
- Released: February 26, 2021
- Recorded: August 2020
- Studio: Fort Horton (Wyldwood)
- Genre: Country
- Length: 33:34
- Labels: Son of Davy; Thirty Tigers
- Producer: Billy Horton

Charley Crockett chronology
| Welcome to Hard Times (2020) | 10 for Slim: Charley Crockett Sings James Hand (2021) | Music City USA (2021) |

Singles from 10 for Slim: Charley Crockett Sings James Hand
- 1. "Lesson in Depression" Released: February 19, 2021

10 for Slim: Charley Crockett Sings James Hand (stylized as Lil' G.L. Presents: 10 for Slim: Charley Crockett Sings James Hand) is the eighth studio album by American singer Charley Crockett, released on February 26, 2021, through Son of Davy and distributed by Thirty Tigers. The album would serve as the third installment in Crockett's Lil' G.L. series of albums.

== Background ==
On June 8, 2020, Charley's friend and mentor James Hand, known to most as Slim, passed away unexpectedly. Hand had played a large role in Charley's love of country music, with the two first meeting in 2013. In 2020, before the COVID-19 pandemic halted their touring, the two were paired up to tour together that year, and Crockett had made a promise that he would cut a record of Hand's songs before he died. The album's last track, "Slim's Lament", was the final song Hand wrote and recorded in his lifetime, having recorded it just a week prior to his passing and sending it to Charley that week.

== Track listing ==
10 for Slim: Charley Crockett Sings James Hand track listing
| No. | Title | Writer(s) | Length |
|---|---|---|---|
| 1. | "Intro" | Charley Crockett | 1:16 |
| 2. | "Midnight Run" | James Hand | 3:51 |
| 3. | "Just a Heart" | Hand | 3:39 |
| 4. | "In the Corner" | Hand | 3:11 |
| 5. | "Over There That's Frank" | Hand | 3:23 |
| 6. | "Don't Tell Me That" | Hand | 2:46 |
| 7. | "Lesson in Depression" | Hand; Deborah J Perry | 2:53 |
| 8. | "Mighty Lonesome Man" | Hand; Perry | 2:47 |
| 9. | "So Did I" | Hand | 3:37 |
| 10. | "Floor to Crawl" | Hand | 2:44 |
| 11. | "Slim's Lament" | Hand | 3:27 |
| Total length: | | | 33:34 |

== Personnel ==
Musicians

- Charley Crockett – lead vocals, acoustic guitar
- Kullen Fox – Hammond B3 organ, piano
- Nathan Fleming – pedal steel
- Billy Horton – electric bass, upright bass
- Bobby Horton – vibraphone
- Jason Moeller – drums
- Colin Colby – acoustic guitar
- Tjarko Jeen – electric guitar
- Dave Biller – electric guitar, acoustic guitar, pedal steel
- Jason Roberts – fiddle

Technical

- Billy Horton – production
- Mark Neill – mixing
- Lee Dyess – engineering, mastering

Visuals

- Alice Maule – design
- Ryan Vestil – photography
