= Welcome to Hard Times (Charley Crockett album) =

2020 album by Charley Crockett

Studio album by Charley Crockett
- Released: July 31, 2020
- Genre: Country
- Length: 41:13
- Labels: Son of Davy; Thirty Tigers
- Producer: Mark Neill

Charley Crockett chronology
Field Recordings, Vol. 1 (2020)	Welcome to Hard Times (2020)	10 for Slim: Charley Crockett Sings James Hand (2021)

Singles from Welcome to Hard Times
- 1. "Welcome to Hard Times" Released: May 27, 2020; 2. "Run Horse Run" Released: June 30, 2020; 3. "Don't Cry" Released: July 22, 2020

Welcome to Hard Times is the seventh studio album by American singer Charley Crockett, released on July 31, 2020, through Son of Davy and distributed by Thirty Tigers.

== Background ==
Releasing the title track on May 27, 2020, Crockett would reveal that a full 13-track album would come out on July 31 of that year.

The album marked the first time Crockett used his self-described Gulf & Western monicker for his music.

== Critical reception ==
Professional ratings
Aggregate scores
Source	Rating
Metacritic	84/100
Review scores
Source	Rating
AllMusic	4/5 stars
American Songwriter	4/5 stars
Mojo	4/5 stars
MusicOMH	5/5 stars
PopMatters	7/10
Spectrum Culture	82%
Spill Magazine	4.5/5 stars
Uncut	4/5 stars

== Track listing ==
Welcome to Hard Times track listing
No.	Title	Writer(s)	Length
1.	"Welcome to Hard Times"	Charley Crockett	03:05
2.	"Run Horse Run"	Crockett	02:41
3.	"Don't Cry"	Dan Auerbach; Crockett; Pat McLaughlin	03:20
4.	"Tennessee Special"	Crockett	03:10
5.	"Fool Somebody Else"	Crockett; Mark Neill	03:58
6.	"Lilly My Dear"	Collin Colby; Crockett; Vincent Neil Emerson; Tyler Heiser	02:38
7.	"Wreck Me"	Crockett; Taylor Grace	02:27
8.	"Heads You Win"	Crockett; Neill	03:13
9.	"Rainin' in My Heart"	Crockett; Mario Valdez	03:50
10.	"Paint It Blue"	Crockett	03:37
11.	"Blackjack County Chain"	Red Lane	02:38
12.	"The Man That Time Forgot"	Crockett; Neill	02:58
13.	"The Poplar Tree"	Dallas Burrow; Crockett	03:31
Total length:			41:13

== Personnel ==
Musicians

- Charley Crockett – lead vocals, acoustic guitar, banjo
- Alexis Sanchez – lead guitar, rhythm guitar
- Nathan Fleming – pedal steel
- Kullen Fox – Hammond B3 organ, piano, harpsichord, acoustic guitar
- Billy Horton – upright bass
- Mario Valdez – drums
- Colin Colby – acoustic guitar, electric guitar, harmony vocals, 6-string bass
- Mark Neill – classical guitar, banjo, harmony vocals, mellotron, percussion
- Makinsey Rosser – background vocals

Technical

- Mark Neill – production
- Lee Dyess – engineering, mastering
- Jeff Powell – mastering, lacquer cut

Visuals

- Alice Maule – artwork
- Ben Christensen – photography
- Kat Trujillo – creative director
