= The Man from Waco =

2022 album by Charley Crockett

Studio album by Charley Crockett
- Released: September 9, 2022
- Studios: The Bunker Studio, Lockhart, Texas
- Genre: Neotraditional country
- Length: 45:02
- Labels: Son of Davy; Thirty Tigers
- Producer: Bruce Robison

Charley Crockett chronology
Lil' G.L. Presents: Jukebox Charley (2022)	The Man from Waco (2022)	Live from the Ryman (2023)

Singles from The Man from Waco
- 1. "I'm Just a Clown" Released: July 13, 2022; 2. "The Man from Waco" Released: August 17, 2022

The Man from Waco is the eleventh studio album by Charley Crockett, released on Son of Davy through Thirty Tigers on September 9, 2022.

== Background ==
Starting out as a series of demo recordings with his typical live backing band, The Blue Drifters, the record was cut mostly as all one take tracks with only a few overdubs spread throughout the whole album. The album was Crockett's first with the Blue Drifters backing him completely, and he wrote or co-wrote the entirety of the album.

Co-writers on the album included his wife Taylor Grace, Bob Dylan, and band members in his keys player Kullen Fuchs and pedal steel guitar player Nathan Fleming.

== Track listing ==
The Man from Waco track listing
No.	Title	Writer(s)	Length
1.	"The Man from Waco Theme"	Charley Crockett; Kullen Fuchs	00:58
2.	"Cowboy Candy"	Crockett	03:19
3.	"Time of the Cottonwood Trees"	Crockett	02:53
4.	"Just Like Honey"	Crockett; Fuchs	02:55
5.	"I'm Just a Clown"	Crockett	04:13
6.	"Black Sedan"	Crockett; Fuchs	03:24
7.	"The Man from Waco"	Crockett; Fuchs; Taylor Grace; Bruce Robison	03:45
8.	"Trinity River"	Crockett	04:29
9.	"Tom Turkey"	Crockett; Bob Dylan	03:32
10.	"Odessa"	Crockett; Nathan Fleming	03:03
11.	"All the Way From Atlanta"	Crockett	03:25
12.	"Horse Thief Mesa"	Crockett	02:21
13.	"July Jackson"	Crockett; Grace	03:01
14.	"The Man from Waco Finale"	Crockett; Fuchs	00:32
15.	"Name on a Billboard"	Crockett	03:00
Total length:			45:02

== Personnel ==
Musicians

- Charley Crockett – lead vocals, guitar
- Alexis Sanchez – electric guitar
- Nathan Fleming – pedal steel
- Kullen Fox – accordion, banjo, guitar, keyboards, trumpet, backing vocals
- Mario Valdez – percussion
- Jacob Marchese – upright bass
- Andrew Corral – violin
- Anthony Farrell – accordion, banjo, guitar, keyboard, backing vocals
- Billy Horton – electric bass, upright bass
- Kelley Mickwee – backing vocals
- Leigh Mahoney – violin
- Rebecca Lester – viola
- Rylie Harrod – cello
- Thomas Van der Brook – saxophone (baritone)

Technical

- Bruce Robison – production
- Billy Horton – production
- Jim Wilson – mastering
- Stephen Barber – arrangement
- Steve Mazur – engineer

Visuals

- Keith Brogdon – artwork
- Bobby Cochran – photography

== Charts ==
Chart performance for The Man from Waco
Chart (2022)	Peak position
US Billboard 200	199

== The Man from Waco (Redux) ==
The Man from Waco (Redux)

EP by Charley Crockett
- Released: May 26, 2023
- Studio: Fort Horton Studios
- Genre: Country
- Length: 17:10
- Labels: Son of Davy; Thirty Tigers
- Producer: Billy Horton

Charley Crockett chronology
The Man from Waco (2022)	The Man from Waco (Redux) (2023)	Live from the Ryman (2023)

=== Track listing ===
The Man from Waco (Redux) track listing
No.	Title	Writer(s)	Length
1.	"The Man from Waco (Billy Horton Sessions)"	Crockett; Fuchs; Taylor Grace; Bruce Robison	03:28
2.	"I'm Just a Clown (Billy Horton Sessions)"	Crockett	03:57
3.	"July Jackson (Billy Horton Sessions)"	Crockett; Taylor Grace	02:44
4.	"Just Like Honey (Billy Horton Sessions)"	Crockett; Fuchs	02:52
5.	"Tom Turkey (Alternate Version)"	Crockett; Bob Dylan	03:55
Total length:			17:10
