= The Blue Drifters =

American country band

- Clockwise from top left: Charley Crockett, Alexis Sanchez, Nathan Fleming, Jacob Marchese, Mario Valdez, and Kullen Fox. All pictured performing at The Classic Center on April 23, 2025

Background information
- Origin: San Benito, Texas, U.S.
- Genres: Country
- Years active: 2014–present
- Members: Charley Crockett; Alexis Sanchez; Nathan Fleming; Kullen Fox; Mario Valdez; Jacob Marchese

The Blue Drifters, is an American country music band, best known as the backing and recording band of country music singer Charley Crockett. Crockett formed the band in 2014, initially consisting of himself and guitarist Alexis Sanchez, and expanding from there starting in 2016.

== History ==
The group initially formed in 2014 with Crockett pairing up with Alexis Sanchez on electric guitar, playing in local bars, eventually recording his debut mixtape that year Get Up Outta Texas.

Crockett would not use the band on his 2015 debut record, A Stolen Jewel, electing to head to California and recording with Kyle Madrigal instead. The group would return to form in 2016 on In the Night, featuring Sanchez on electric guitar with both Nathan Fleming and Kullen Fox joining the group.

Mario "Mayo" Valdez would join the band on percussion at the start of 2018 with the release of Crockett's fourth studio album, Lonesome as a Shadow.

Jacob Marchese would join the band on bass starting at the end of 2021 and make his debut on record on 2022's The Man from Waco.

== Band members ==
=== Current ===
- Charley Crockett — lead vocals, acoustic guitar, electric guitar, piano, sitar (2014–present)
- Alexis Sanchez — electric guitar (2014–present)
- Nathan Fleming — pedal steel, lap steel (2016–present)
- Kullen Fox — organ, piano, keyboard, accordion, harpsichord, glockenspiel, clavinet, wurlitzer, acoustic guitar, banjo, backing vocals, trumpet (2016–present)
- Mario "Mayo" Valdez — percussion (2018–present)
- Jacob Marchese — electric bass, upright bass (2021–present)
