= In the Night (Charley Crockett album) =

2016 album by Charley Crockett

Studio album by Charley Crockett
- Released: June 6, 2016
- Genre: Country
- Length: 37:00
- Labels: Son of Davy; Thirty Tigers
- Producers: Charley Crockett; Jay Moeller

Charley Crockett chronology
A Stolen Jewel (2015)	In the Night (2016)	Lil' G.L.'s Honky Tonk Jubilee (2017)

Alternative cover
- 2019 and 2021 reissue and digital cover

In the Night is the second studio album by Charley Crockett, released on Son of Davy through Field Day Records on June 6, 2016. The album would later be re-released twice with Crockett's signing to Thirty Tigers, once in 2019 and once in 2021.

== Background ==
Crockett would go on record saying that he intentionally added a wide mix of the New Orleans, Dallas, and Austin sound he had come to learn over the course of his career on In the Night, now having the resources to explore that sound fully.

== Track listing ==
In the Night track listing
No.	Title	Writer(s)	Length
1.	"In the Night"	Charley Crockett	3:57
2.	"Baby 1-2-3"	Crockett	2:10
3.	"I Am Not Afraid"	Crockett	2:45
4.	"Look What You Done"	Emery Blades	1:58
5.	"I'm Workin'"	Crockett	2:33
6.	"Silver Dagger"	Crockett	2:26
7.	"What's Made Milwaukee Famous"	Glenn Sutton	2:20
8.	"Cry for Me Baby"	Elmore James	2:51
9.	"Ain't Got No Time to Lose"	Crockett	2:33
10.	"Out of Bad Luck"	Magic Sam; Al Benson
11.	"Wasted Days and Wasted Nights"	Freddy Fender; Wayne Duncan	2:19
12.	"After Laughter"	Mary Frierson; Johnnie Frierson	3:52
13.	"Downtrodden Man"	Crockett	3:05
Total length:			37:00

== Personnel ==
Musicians

- Charley Crockett – lead vocals, acoustic guitar, electric guitar, piano
- Alexis Sanchez – lead guitar, rhythm guitar
- Nathan Fleming – pedal steel
- Kullen Fox – piano, accordion
- Billy Horton – electric bass, upright double bass
- Jason Moeller – drums, percussion
- Anthony Farrell – organ
- Jeff Dazey – baritone saxophone, tenor saxophone
- Matt Farrell – piano
- Charles Mills, Jr. – trumpet
- Jimmy Sweeteater – washboard, harmonica

Technical

- Charley Crockett – production
- Jay Moeller – co-producer
- Billy Horton – engineer
- Jim Wilson – mastering

Visuals

- Eusebio Martinez – artwork
- Lyza Renee – photography
