= Dollar a Day =

Studio album by Charley Crockett
- Released: August 8, 2025
- Studios: Sunset Sound Studio 3, Los Angeles
- Genre: Country
- Length: 46:47
- Labels: Lonestar Rider; Island
- Producers: Charley Crockett; Shooter Jennings

Charley Crockett chronology
Lonesome Drifter (2025)	Dollar a Day (2025)	Age of the Ram (2026)

Alternative cover
- Target exclusive album cover

Singles from Dollar a Day
- 1. "Crucified Son" Released: July 3, 2025; 2. "All Around Cowboy" Released: July 25, 2025

Dollar a Day is the fifteenth studio album by American singer Charley Crockett, released on August 8, 2025, through Lone Star Rider under Island Records. The album was Crockett's second release in his Sagebrush Trilogy of albums.

== Background ==
The second album produced by Crockett and Shooter Jennings, Dollar a Day saw the 2nd installment of Crockett's Sagebrush Trilogy, taking elements of 1970s country and funk, and fusing them to a sound that is distinctly Crockett's own.

== Track listing ==
Dollar a Day track listing
No.	Title	Writer(s)	Length
1.	"Dollar a Day"	Dick Glasser; Vincent LePar	1:56
2.	"Crucified Son"	Charley Crockett; Kyle Madrigal; Taylor Grace	3:29
3.	"Woman in a Bar"	Crockett	2:48
4.	"Ain't That Right"	Crockett	3:25
5.	"Lone Star"	Crockett	3:38
6.	"El Paso to Denver"	Crockett; Grace	2:43
7.	"Santa Fe Ring"	Crockett	2:59
8.	"Age of the Ram (Theme)"	Stephen Barber	2:40
9.	"I Stay Ready"	Anthony Farrell	3:19
10.	"All Around Cowboy"	J.W. Routh; Len Pollard	2:57
11.	"Tennessee Quick Cash"	Crockett; Shooter Jennings	4:12
12.	"Die With My Dreams On"	Rich Minus	2:44
13.	"Ballad of a Lonesome Drifter"	Crockett; Domenico Colarossi	2:59
14.	"Destroyed"	Dan Penn; Spooner Oldham	3:10
15.	"Alamosa"	Crockett; Jennings; Madrigal	3:48
Total length:			46:47

== Personnel ==
Credits adapted from the album's liner notes.

=== Musicians ===
- Charley Crockett – vocals, acoustic guitar, electric guitar, lead guitars
- Rich Brotherton – guitar, banjo, vocals
- Anthony Farrell – keyboards, bass, glockenspiel, guitar
- Nathan Fleming – pedal steel
- Kullen Fuchs – keyboards, trumpet, vocals
- Bob Glaub – bass
- Kyle Madrigal – bass, vocals
- Jay Moeller – drums, vocals
- Alexis Sanchez – guitar
- Mario Valdez – drums, vocals
- Shooter Jennings – piano
- Stephen Barber – arrangement, conductor
- Suzie Katayama – contracting
- Charlie Bisharat – violins
- Susan Chatman – violins
- Mario de León – violins
- Luanne Homzy – violins
- Michele Kikuchi-Richards – violins
- Josefina Vergara – violins
- Irina Voloshina – violins
- Zach Dellinger – violas
- Tom Lea – violas
- Ross Gasworth – cellos
- Cameron Stone – cellos
- George Doering – Bass IV, electric guitar, lap steel

=== Technical and visuals ===
- Shooter Jennings – production, mixing
- Charley Crockett – production
- David Spreng – recording, mixing
- Nate Haessly – engineering assistance
- Zachary Zajdel – engineering assistance
- Pete Lyman – mastering
- Micah Givens – artwork
- Bobby Cochran – photography

== Charts ==
Chart performance for Dollar a Day
Chart (2025)	Peak position
UK Americana Albums (Official Charts)	30
UK Country Albums (Official Charts)	11
US Billboard 200	196
US Top Country Albums (Billboard)	37
