= A Stolen Jewel =

2015 album by Charley Crockett

Studio album by Charley Crockett
- Released: May 5, 2015
- Recorded: 2014–2015
- Studios: Sack Ranch, Potter Valley, California
- Genres: Blues; country
- Label: Son of Davy
- Producers: Charley Crockett; Kyle Madrigal

Charley Crockett chronology
Get Up Outta Texas (2014)	A Stolen Jewel (2015)	In the Night (2016)

A Stolen Jewel is the debut studio album by Charley Crockett, released on Son of Davy on May 5, 2015.

== Background ==
After taking on a job at a marijuana farm in Mendocino County, California, and the advantage of their boss being away for the winter, Crockett would enlist friend and fellow hand and musician Kyle Madrigal to record the album in a loft in a barn on the property in the winter of 2014.

== Track listing ==
A Stolen Jewel track listing
No.	Title	Writer(s)	Length
1.	"Cold Hearted Woman"	Charley Crockett	2:54
2.	"March Wind's Gonna Blow My Blues All Away"	Public Domain	2:24
3.	"A Stolen Jewel"	Crockett	2:45
4.	"Drivin' Nails in My Coffin"	Jerry Irby	2:36
5.	"Trinity River"	Crockett	3:55
6.	"Whiteman's Interlude"	Crockett	1:03
7.	"What the Preacher Say"	Crockett	2:37
8.	"Juanita"	Chris Hillman; Gram Parsons	3:03
9.	"Walkin' the Floor Over You"	Ernest Tubb	3:55
10.	"I Ain't from Memphis"	Crockett	3:15
11.	"I'm Gonna Be a Wheel Someday"	Fats Domino; Dave Bartholomew; Roy Hayes	2:30
12.	"Cold Water"	Tom Waits; Kathleen Brennan	2:58
13.	"Bei Mir Bist Du Schoen"	Jacob Jacobs; Sammy Cahn; Saul Chaplin	2:47
Total length:			37:41

== Personnel ==
Musicians

- Charley Crockett – lead vocals, acoustic guitar, percussion
- Kyle Madrigal – upright bass, dobro, percussion
- Bobby Cochran – drums
- Clay Hawkins – dobro
- Andy Mattern – harmonica
- Sarah Larkin – harmony vocals
- Sarah Ryan – harmony vocals
- Paul Kemp – organ
- Dan Miller – saxophone
- Charles Mills, Jr. – trumpet

Technical

- Charley Crockett – production, arrangement
- Kyle Madrigal – production
- Clay Hawkins – post production

Visuals

- R.M. Hurley – artwork
