= Lonesome Drifter =

Studio album by Charley Crockett
- Released: March 14, 2025
- Studio: Sunset Sound Studio 3, Los Angeles
- Genre: Neotraditional country
- Length: 38:05
- Label: Lone Star Rider; Island
- Producer: Charley Crockett; Shooter Jennings

Charley Crockett chronology
Visions of Dallas (2024)	Lonesome Drifter (2025)	Dollar a Day (2025)

Singles from Lonesome Drifter
- 1. "Lonesome Drifter" Released: January 31, 2025; 2. "Game I Can't Win" Released: February 21, 2025

Lonesome Drifter is the fourteenth studio album by American country singer Charley Crockett. It was released on March 14, 2025, through Lone Star Rider under Island Records. The album marked Crockett's first release in his Sagebrush Trilogy of albums.

== Background ==
Produced by Crockett and Shooter Jennings, and recorded in ten days at the Sunset Sound Studios in Los Angeles, the album features twelve songs, including the title track, which was released as a single on January 31, 2025. Influenced by the work of Bill Withers, Lonesome Drifter is the debut album by Crockett on a major label. Crockett revealed in an interview with Billboard, that the album is the first in a trilogy, stating "I just got the second one done, and I’ve got the theme and sketch of the third one done."

== Reception ==
Professional ratings
Review scores
Source	Rating
Paste	7.5/10
Pitchfork	7.2/10

Los Angeles Times described the album as "a gorgeous set of soulful, lightly psychedelic country-blues tunes." Dallas Times commented that "Crockett hasn’t changed a bit on Lonesome Drifter, with its no-frills blend of old-school Texas country-blues, a style he's been honing since his days busking in Deep Ellum." Pitchfork rated the album 7.2 out of 10 and stated "Flush with doubt and humanity, Lonesome Drifter is a downbeat twist on the great Robert Earl Keen's liturgical formulation: The road goes on forever." No Depression remarked that Lonesome Drifter "spotlights Crockett's consistency, as he spins out another set of deftly crafted songs." Rolling Stone referred to it as a "slow-burning country-blues rocker that finds him telling the tale of a vagabond traveler, complete with a searing guitar solo." Paste assigned it a rating of 7.5 out of 10, stating "Lonesome Drifter continues Crockett's white hot run of records that sound great and are remarkably even-keeled."

== Track listing ==
All music is composed by Charley Crockett and Shooter Jennings.

No.	Title	Writer(s)	Length
1.	"Lonesome Drifter"	Charley Crockett	3:02
2.	"Game I Can't Win"	Crockett	3:21
3.	"Jamestown Ferry"	Bobby Borchers and Mack Vickery	3:26
4.	"Easy Money"	Crockett	3:02
5.	"Under Neon Lights"	Crockett	3:08
6.	"This Crazy Life"	Crockett	3:02
7.	"The Death of Bill Bailey"	Crockett	3:06
8.	"Never No More"	Alan Block, Don Hect and Rita Ross	3:34
9.	"Life of a Country Singer"	Crockett, Shooter Jennings, Kyle Madrigal, Richard Lenz and Brotherton Jr.	2:59
10.	"One Trick Pony"	Crockett, Francis Farrell-McDaniel	3:28
11.	"Night Rider"	Crockett	3:18
12.	"Amarillo by Morning"	Paul Fraser, Terry Stafford	2:39
Total length:			38:05

== Personnel ==
=== Musicians ===
- Charley Crockett – lead vocals
- Mario Valdez – drums
- Jacob Marchese – bass
- Dave Biller – electric guitar
- Alexis Sanchez – second electric guitar
- Rich Brotherton – acoustic guitar (all tracks), banjo (track 2)
- Kullen Fox – piano, Wurlitzer, orchestral bells, trumpet
- Kyle Madrigal – bass (tracks 6, 7), background vocals (11)
- Anthony Farrell – organ (all tracks), baritone (track 10)
- Stephen Barber – string arrangements (tracks 4, 6, 9, 12)
- Suzie Katayama – strings (tracks 4, 6, 9, 12)
- Charlie Bisharat – strings (tracks 4, 6, 9, 12)
- Mario De Leon – strings (tracks 4, 6, 9, 12)
- Joel G. Deuroin – strings (tracks 4, 6, 9, 12)
- Luke Maurer – strings (tracks 4, 6, 9, 12)
- Grace Oh – strings (tracks 4, 6, 9, 12)
- Joel Pargman – strings (tracks 4, 6, 9, 12)
- Michele Kikuchi-Richards – strings (tracks 4, 6, 9, 12)
- Charles Tyler – strings (tracks 4, 6, 9, 12)
- Josefina Vergara – strings (tracks 4, 6, 9, 12)
- Tamara Hatwan – strings (tracks 4, 6, 9, 12)
- John Zachary Dellinger – strings (tracks 4, 6, 9, 12)
- Jacob Braun – strings (tracks 4, 6, 9, 12)
- Jasper Randall – vocal arrangements (tracks 5, 7, 12)
- Keri Larson – vocals (tracks 5, 7, 12)
- Raya Yarbrough – vocals (tracks 5, 7, 12)
- Sara Mann – vocals (tracks 5, 7, 12)
- Windy Wagner – vocals (tracks 5, 7, 12)

=== Technical ===
- Charley Crockett – production
- Shooter Jennings – production
- Pete Lyman – mastering
- Trina Shoemaker – mixing
- David Spreng – recording
- Nate Haessly – engineering assistance

=== Visuals ===
- Micah Givens – artwork
- Bobby Cochran – photography

== Charts ==
Chart performance for Lonesome Drifter
Chart (2025)	Peak position
Croatian International Albums (HDU)	4
UK Americana Albums (OCC)	19
UK Country Albums (OCC)	8
US Billboard 200	128
US Top Country Albums (Billboard)	25
