= Lonesome as a Shadow =

2018 album by Charley Crockett

Studio album by Charley Crockett
- Released: April 20, 2018
- Recorded: 2018
- Studio: Sam C. Phillips (Memphis)
- Genres: Country; blues
- Length: 30:00
- Label: Son of Davy
- Producers: Charley Crockett; Matt Ross-Spang

Charley Crockett chronology
| Lil' G.L.'s Honky Tonk Jubilee (2017) | Lonesome as a Shadow (2018) | Lil' G.L.'s Blue Bonanza (2018) |

Lonesome as a Shadow is the fourth studio album by Charley Crockett, released on Son of Davy on April 20, 2018.

== Background ==
The album was recorded at Sam Phillips Recording Studio in Memphis, Tennessee and co-produced with Matt Ross-Spang, the album was Charley's first album of entirely original material.

== Track listing ==
All tracks are written by Charley Crockett, except for "Sad & Blue", which Crockett co-wrote with Kyle Madrigal.

Lonesome as a Shadow track listing
| No. | Title | Length |
|---|---|---|
| 1. | "I Wanna Cry" | 2:25 |
| 2. | "The Sky'd Become Teardrops" | 2:13 |
| 3. | "Ain't Gotta Worry Child" | 3:05 |
| 4. | "How Long Will I Last" | 2:28 |
| 5. | "If Not the Fool" | 2:48 |
| 6. | "Help Me Georgia" | 2:20 |
| 7. | "Lonesome as a Shadow" | 2:28 |
| 8. | "Sad & Blue" | 2:46 |
| 9. | "Lil' Girl's Name" | 2:01 |
| 10. | "Oh so Shaky" | 2:55 |
| 11. | "Goin' Back to Texas" | 2:24 |
| 12. | "Change Yo' Mind" | 2:19 |
| Total length: | | 30:00 |

== Personnel ==
Musicians

- Charley Crockett – lead vocals, acoustic guitar
- Kullen Fox – keyboards, organ, accordion
- Nathan Fleming – pedal steel
- Alexis Sanchez – electric guitar
- Mario Valdez – drums
- Charles Mills Jr. – trumpet
- Matt Ross-Spang – guitar, percussion
- Emsy Robinson Jr. – bass

Technical

- Charley Crockett – production
- Matt Ross-Spang – production, mixing
- Jonathan Pines – mastering
- Wesley Graham – engineering assistance
- Jeff Powell – lacquer cut

Visuals

- Lyza Renee – photography
- Field Day Records – artwork, design, layout
