= Taylor Grace =

American country musician (born 1993)

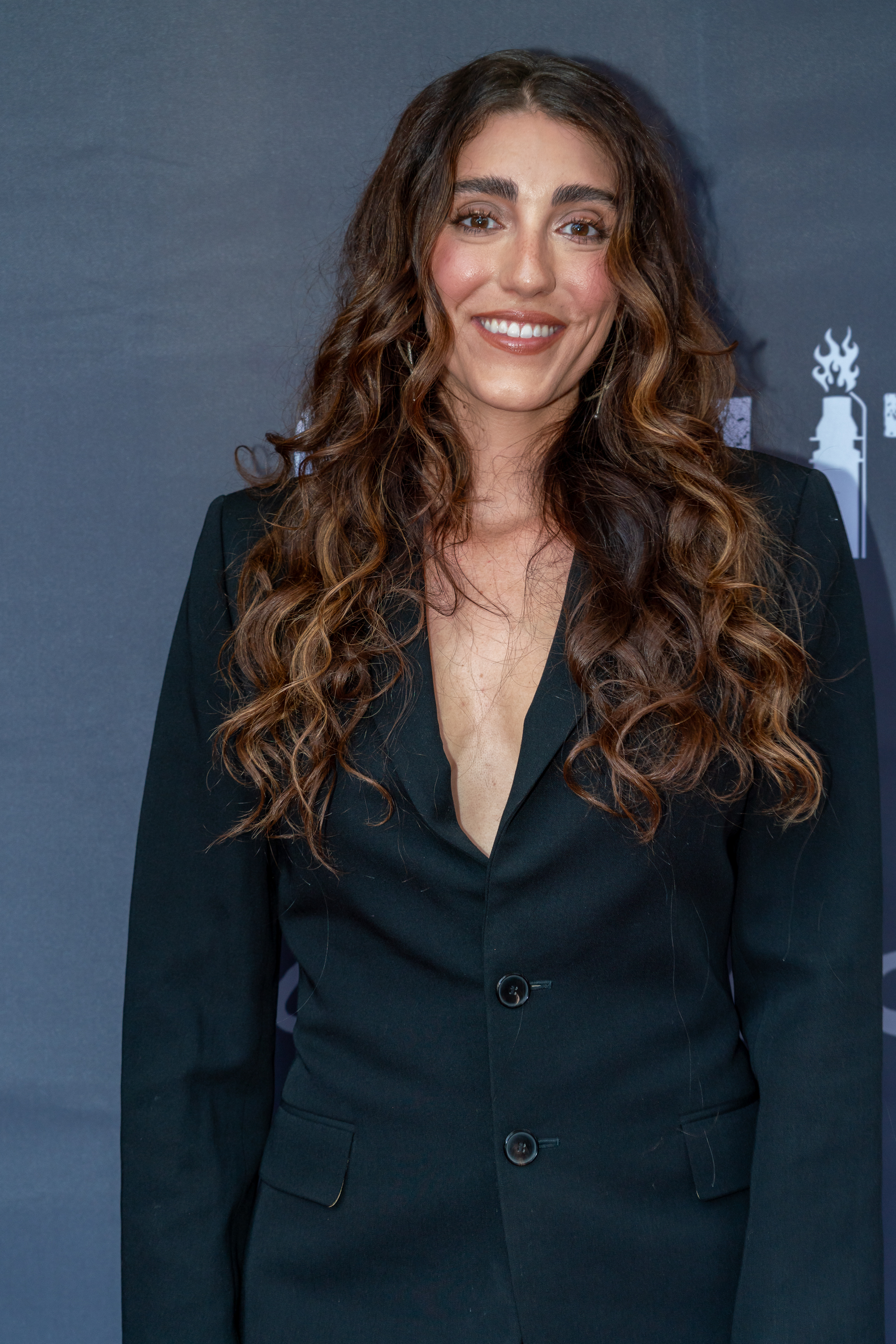
- Grace in 2026

Background information
- Born: Taylor Day Grace; December 26, 1993 (age 32); Houston, Texas, United States
- Origin: Memphis, Tennessee, United States
- Genres: Americana; country; blues
- Occupation: Musician
- Instruments: Vocals; guitar
- Years active: 2019–present
- Labels: Taylor Grace; TuneCore
- Spouse: Charley Crockett (m. 2024)
- Website: taylordaygrace.com

Taylor Day Crockett (née Grace; born December 26, 1993) is an American country and blues singer-songwriter.

== Career ==
=== Songwriting ===
Grace started writing songs at the age of 24 in 2019. She would go onto co-write numerous songs with her now husband Charley Crockett starting in 2020 starting on the album Welcome to Hard Times. Songs she wrote or co-wrote include Wreck Me (2020), Are We Lonesome Yet (2021), The Man from Waco (2022), and Visions of Dallas (2024), among others.

== Personal life ==
Grace began dating fellow musician, Charley Crockett on New Year's Day 2020, after a chance encounter at The White Horse Saloon. The couple had initially met at Antone's in Austin, Texas in 2018. She would become engaged to Crockett in January 2023 and they would marry in July 2024 at Willie Nelson's Luck Ranch in Spicewood, Texas.

== Discography ==
Taylor Grace discography
- Studio albums: 2
- Singles: 2

=== Studio albums ===
Title	Album details
Hello Stranger	Release date: February 14, 2024; Label: Taylor Grace, TuneCore; Formats: LP, digital download
Wild One: Taylor Grace Performs Thin Lizzy	Release date: February 14, 2026; Label: Taylor Grace, TuneCore; Formats: LP, digital download

=== Singles ===
List of singles, showing year released and album name
Year	Title	Album
2024	"Fine Street Woman"	Hello Stranger
2025	"We'll Meet in Memphis"	Non-album single
