= Thirty Tigers =

American entertainment company

- Parent company: Sony Music Entertainment
- Founded: 2002
- Founder: David Macias; Deb Markland
- Distributor: The Orchard
- Genre: Various
- Country of origin: United States
- Official website: thirtytigers.com

Thirty Tigers is an American music marketing, distribution and management company for independent artists, based in Nashville.

== History ==
The company was founded in 2002 by David Macias and Deb Markland and is distributed by The Orchard.

In 2014, Thirty Tigers entered into a strategic partnership with Sony Music Nashville to promote Chase Rice's single "Ready Set Roll" and album Ignite the Night. This was possibly the first time in country music that a major label paid only for radio promotion.

In 2016, Thirty Tigers partnered with Triple 8 Management and Sony Music to create the country-music label Triple Tigers. Triple Tigers signed Russell Dickerson and Scotty McCreery as its first acts.

In 2024, The Black Opry launched its label in conjunction with Thirty Tigers.

== Overview ==
Thirty Tigers is not a record label, but releases around 100 albums per year for artists who retain ownership and control of their music and career choices.

Thirty Tigers has significant influence in the Americana music community, but works with artists from a wide range of genres including folk, indie rock, R&B, hip hop, and country.
