= Johnny Paycheck discography =

- Paycheck's 1991 album The Last Outlaw.
- Studio albums: 30
- Live albums: 4
- Compilation albums: 27
- Singles: 64
- No. 1 Single: 1

The Johnny Paycheck discography consists of 30 studio albums, four live albums, 27 compilation albums, 64 singles by American country music singer Johnny Paycheck. Of his albums, one is certified Platinum and one is certified Gold from the Recording Industry Association of America, with his highest peaking album being Take This Job and Shove It, which peaked at number two on the Billboard Top Country Albums chart. That album's title track was also his highest single, topping the Billboard Hot Country Songs.

Of Paycheck's 30 studio albums, only half of them charted, with his last charting album coming in 1987, with Modern Times which peaked at 54.

== Studio albums ==
=== 1960s ===
Title	Album details	Peak positions	Notes
Title	Album details	US Country	Notes
At Carnegie Hall	Release date: April 1, 1966; Label: Little Darlin' Records (SLD-8001); Format: LP	22	Paycheck's debut album, but not a live recording as the title might suggest.
The Lovin' Machine	Release date: July 1966; Label: Little Darlin' Records (SLD-8003); Format: LP	—	
Gospeltime in My Fashion	Release date: May 1967; Label: Little Darlin' Records (SLD-8004); Format: LP	—	
Jukebox Charlie	Release date: July 1967; Label: Little Darlin' Records (SLD-8006); Format: LP	10	
Country Soul	Release date: May 1968; Label: Little Darlin' Records (SLD-8010); Format: LP	41	
Wherever You Are	Release date: November 1969; Label: Little Darlin' Records (SLD-8023); Format: LP	—	
"—" denotes releases that did not chart

=== 1970s ===
Title	Album details	Peak chart positions		Notes
Title	Album details	US Country	CAN Country	Notes
Again	Release date: 1970; Label: Certron Corporation (CS-7002); Format: LP	—	—	Paycheck's only release with Certron. Originally recorded for Little Darlin' but released through Certron after the former went out of business.
She's All I Got	Release date: December 1971; Label: Epic Records (E-31141); Format: LP, CD	5	—	Paycheck's first release with Epic Records, as well as his first collaboration with famed producer Billy Sherrill. Reissued on CD by Koch Records in 2000.
Someone to Give My Love To	Release date: May 1972; Label: Epic Records (KE-31449); Format: LP, CD, Digital	9	—	Reissued via digital services and a double feature compilation CD.
Somebody Loves Me	Release date: October 1972; Label: Epic Records (KE-31707); Format: LP, CD, Digital	16	—	Reissued via digital services and a double feature compilation CD.
Heartbreak, Tenn.	Release date: 1972; Label: Hilltop (JS-6124); Format: LP	—	—	Contains previously unreleased studio material that was recorded anywhere from 1964 to 1966.
Mr. Lovemaker	Release date: June 1973; Label: Epic Records (KE-32387); Format: LP	12	—	
Song and Dance Man	Release date: December 1973; Label: Epic Records (KE-32570); Format: LP	16	—	
Loving You Beats All I've Ever Seen	Release date: March 1975; Label: Epic Records (KE-33354); Format: LP	—	—	
11 Months and 29 Days	Release date: October 1976; Label: Epic Records (KE-33943); Format: LP, CD	40	—	Paycheck's first "outlaw" album. Reissued via a double feature compilation CD.
Slide Off of Your Satin Sheets	Release date: May 1977; Label: Epic Records (KE-34693); Format: LP, CD	22	—	Reissued via a double feature compilation CD.
Take This Job and Shove It^{[A]}	Release date: November 1977; Label: Epic Records (KE-35045); Format: LP, CD, Digital	2	—	Certified Platinum by the RIAA in the US for sales in excess of 1,000,000.
Armed and Crazy	Release date: November 1978; Label: Epic Records (KE-35444); Format: LP, CD, Digital	15	12	Reissued via digital services and a double feature compilation CD.
Bars - Booze - Blondes	Release date: June 1979; Label: Little Darlin' Records (SP-10979); Format: LP	—	—	Composed of unreleased Little Darlin' material that was issued after Paycheck became successful with Epic, in addition to some previously released songs.
Everybody's Got a Family... Meet Mine	Release date: December 1979; Label: Epic Records (JE-36200); Format: LP	42	17	First album to have musician credits.
"—" denotes releases that did not chart

=== 1980s ===
Title	Album details	Peak positions	Notes
Title	Album details	US Country	Notes
Mr. Hag Told My Story	Release date: March 1981; Label: Epic Records (JE-36761); Format: LP, CD	40	Reissued on CD by Koch in 1998.
Lovers and Losers	Release date: March 1982; Label: Epic Records (FE-37933); Format: LP	—	Paycheck's final studio album release on Epic Records.
I Don't Need To Know That Right Now	Release date: 1983; Label: Allegiance (AV-435)	—	Contains new tracks as well as re-recordings. Reissued as The Happy Hour on digital music services.
Modern Times	Release date: March 1987; Label: Mercury Records (#830404); Format: LP	54	Paycheck's only release for Mercury. One of Paycheck's rarest releases, having not been reissued in any modern format.
Outlaw at the Cross	Release date: November 1, 1988; Label: Damascus To the Cross Records (JP-1001); Format: LP, Digital	—	A new set of gospel tunes recorded by Paycheck. The royalties from the album were donated to a Los Angeles-based charity to help children with AIDS. Reissued as Gospel on Pretty World Records in 2010.
"—" denotes releases that did not chart

=== 1990s and 2000s ===
Title	Album details	Notes
The Last Outlaw	Release date: 1991; Label: Air Records; Format: Cassette, Digital	
The Difference in Me	Release date: October 1, 1993; Label: Playback Records; Format: CD, Digital	Features re-recordings of Paycheck's hits "Old Violin" and "Take This Job and Shove It" as well as eight new recordings.
Tribute to George Jones	Release date: May 16, 1996; Label: K-tel; Format: CD, Digital	Reissued both as Sings George Jones and The Race is On with different track orders.
I'm a Survivor	Release date: 1996; Label: Sterling Entertainment Group; Format: LP, CD, Digital	Recorded in the mid-1980s but not released until almost ten years later. Reissued as Survivor on Hitman Records in 2001 with inferior audio quality.
Studio 102 Essentials	Release date: May 20, 2008; Label: Suite 102; Format: Digital	Contains 30 previously unreleased studio recordings, mostly covers and a few re-recorded Paycheck songs. These sessions have been compiled into the compilations The Collection, I'll Take That Paycheck Now and Paycheck Time.

== Collaborative albums ==
Title	Album details	Peak positions	Notes
Title	Album details	US Country	Notes
Double Trouble (with George Jones)	Release date: June 1980; Label: Epic Records (JE-35783); Format: LP, CD, Digital	45	Reissued by Razor & Tie on CD in 1996, but the release has since gone out of print. Also available via digital services.

== Live albums ==
Title	Album details	Peak positions	Notes
Title	Album details	US Country	Notes
New York Town	Release date: 1980; Label: Epic Records (JE-36496); Format: LP	48	Recorded live at the Lone Star Cafe in New York City. Considered a landmark live album in the history of country music.
Live in Branson, MO, U.S.A.	Release date: 1993; Label: LaserLight Records (#12136); Format: CD	—	Recorded live on August 4, 1992 at the Roy Clark Celebrity Theatre in Branson, Missouri. Reissued in 2001 whilst omitting three tracks.
Live at Gilley's	Release date: May 18, 1999; Label: Atlantic Records (#92829-2); Format: CD	—	Recorded live on October 9, 1985 at Gilley's Club in Pasadena, Texas.
Live at the Palomino	Release date: November 1, 2011; Label: Vintage Masters Inc.; Format: CD, Digital	—	Recorded live circa 1977 at the legendary Palomino Club in Los Angeles, California as a radio special. Features appearances by R.C. Bannon, Harry Newman and Gene Price.
"—" denotes releases that did not chart

== Compilation albums ==
Title	Album details	Peak positions	Notes
Title	Album details	US Country	Notes
Johnny Paycheck's Greatest Hits	Release date: December 1968; Label: Little Darlin' Records (SLD-8012)	42	
Johnny Paycheck's Greatest Hits	Release date: July 1974; Label: Epic Records (KE-33091)	21	
At His Best	Release date: 1975; Label: Power Pak/Gusto	—	
Johnny Paycheck's Greatest Hits, Vol. 2	Release date: October 1978; Label: Epic Records (JE-35623)	23	Certified Gold by the RIAA for sales in excess of 500,000.
The Outlaw	Release date: January 1979; Label: Little Darlin' Records (LDA-0781)	—	Compilation of Paycheck's Little Darlin' material with an exclusive track, "I'm a Coward." Some songs have new strings and harmonica overdubs.
Jesus and the Outlaw	Release date: February 1979; Label: Little Darlin' Records (LDA-0792)	—	Compilation of Paycheck's Gospeltime material with one exclusive track, "Day is Almost Over." Features new arrangements with the Jordanaires overlaid over the original vocal tracks by Paycheck.
Honky Tonk & Slow Music	Release date: April 1979; Label: Little Darlin' Records (SP-10479)	—	
Touch My Heart	Release date: May 1979; Label: Little Darlin' Records (SP-10579)	—	
Encore	Release date: July 1981; Label: Epic Records (FE-37345)	—	
Biggest Hits	Release date: August 1982; Label: Epic Records (FE-38322)	—	Paycheck's final release as a member of Epic's roster.
The Real Mr. Heartache: The Little Darlin' Years	Release date: 1996; Label: Country Music Foundation	—	Reissued in 2000.
16 Biggest Hits	Release date: 1999; Label: Sony Music Entertainment	—	"Loving You Beats All I've Ever Seen" on the CD does not have the fiddle in it like on the 1975 LP. Also on "A Heart Don't Need Eyes" it is missing the tic tac bass effect.
Remembering	Release date: 2002; Label: Orpheus Records	—	
The Soul & the Edge: The Best of Johnny Paycheck	Release date: April 30, 2002; Label: Epic/Legacy Recordings	—	
The Collection	Release date: 2003; Label: Madacy	—	
The Little Darlin' Sound of Johnny Paycheck: The Beginning	Release date: May 11, 2004; Label: Koch Records	—	The first release of what was intended to be a comprehensive reissue program of all of Paycheck's Little Darlin' Material on Koch Records. Contains previously unreleased material.
The Little Darlin' Sound of Johnny Paycheck: On His Way	Release date: January 25, 2005; Label: Koch Records	—	The second release of Paycheck's Little Darlin' material on Koch. It is composed of hit songs Paycheck had while on the label.
The Little Darlin' Sound of Johnny Paycheck: The Gospel Truth - The Complete Gospel Sessions	Release date: April 26, 2005; Label: Koch Records	—	The final release in this series of Paycheck's Little Darlin' material by Koch. It is composed of the material for Paycheck's album Gospeltime in My Fashion as well as the later compilation Jesus and the Outlaw. Not available digitally.
11 Months and 29 Days/Slide Off of Your Satin Sheets	Release date: February 21, 2006; Label: Raven Records	—	Raven Records reissue of the two studio albums on one disc with five tracks from Mr. Hag Told My Story.
Shakin' the Blues	Release date: December 1, 2006; Label: Bear Family Records	—	Bear Family Records reissue of 29 tracks that Paycheck recorded under the name of Donny Young. Some tracks previously unreleased. Recorded 1958–1964
Take This Job and Shove It/Armed and Crazy	Release date: August 27, 2007; Label: Raven Records	—	Raven Records reissue of the two studio albums on one disc with five tracks from Mr. Hag Told My Story.
Nowhere to Run: The Little Darlin' Years 1966–1970	Release date: September 8, 2009; Label: Omni Recording Corporation	—	
Someone to Give My Love To/Somebody Loves Me	Release date: October 26, 2010; Label: Hux Records	—	Hux Records reissue of the two studio albums on one disc.
Double Trouble/A Taste of Yesterday's Wine	Release date: June 25, 2013; Label: Morello Records	—	Reissue of the collaborative album Double Trouble by George Jones and Johnny Paycheck as a double feature with the collaborative album A Taste of Yesterday's Wine by George Jones and Merle Haggard.
The Essential Johnny Paycheck	Release date: April 1, 2014; Label: Legacy Recordings	—	
I'll Take That Paycheck Now	Release date: August 3, 2015; Label: Countdown Media	—	
Paycheck Time	Release date: August 3, 2015; Label: Countdown Media	—	
"—" denotes releases that did not chart

== Singles ==
=== Singles as Donny Young ===
Year	Single
1958	"It's Been a Long, Long Time for Me"
1959	"The Old Man and the River"
1960	"Shakin' the Blues"
1961	"One Day a Week"
1961	"Go Ring the Bells"
1962	"I'd Come Back to Me" (with the Merry Melody Singers)
1964	"Don't Get Lonesome Without Me"

=== 1960s ===
Year	Single	Peak positions	Album
Year	Single	US Country	Album
1964	"I'd Rather Be Your Fool"	—	—N/a
1965	"For Those Who Think Young"	—	—N/a
1965	"A-11"	26	—N/a
1965	"Heartbreak Tennessee"	40	—N/a
1966	"I'm Barely Hangin' on to Me"	—	—N/a
1966	"The Lovin' Machine"	8	The Lovin' Machine
1966	"Ballad of the Green Berets"	—	At Carnegie Hall
1966	"Right Back Where We Parted"	—	—N/a
1966	"Motel Time Again"	13	Jukebox Charlie
1967	"Jukebox Charlie"	15	Jukebox Charlie
1967	"The Cave"	32	—N/a
1967	"Don't Monkey with Another Monkey's Monkey"	41	Greatest Hits
1968	"(It Won't Be Long) And I'll Be Hating You"	59	Greatest Hits
1968	"My Heart Keeps Running to You"	66	Greatest Hits
1968	"If I'm Gonna Sink"	73	Wherever You Are
1969	"My World of Memories"	—	Wherever You Are
1969	"Wherever You Are"	31	Wherever You Are
1969	"Wildfire"	—	Wherever You Are
"—" denotes releases that did not chart

=== 1970s ===
Year	Single	Peak chart positions		Album
Year	Single	US Country	CAN Country	Album
1971	"She's All I Got"^{[B]}	2	2	She's All I Got
1972	"Someone to Give My Love To"	4	7	Someone to Give My Love To
1972	"Love Is a Good Thing"	12	24	Someone to Give My Love To
1972	"Somebody Loves Me"	21	13	Somebody Loves Me
1973	"Something About You I Love"	10	20	Mr. Lovemaker
1973	"Mr. Lovemaker"	2	3	Mr. Lovemaker
1973	"Song and Dance Man"	8	9	Song and Dance Man
1974	"My Part of Forever"	19	37	Song and Dance Man
1974	"Keep on Lovin' Me"	23	33	Greatest Hits
1974	"For a Minute There"	12	2	Song and Dance Man
1975	"Loving You Beats All I've Ever Seen"	26	46	Loving You Beats All I've Ever Seen
1975	"I Don't Love Her Anymore"	38	45	Loving You Beats All I've Ever Seen
1975	"All-American Man"	23	—	—N/a
1976	"The Feminine Touch"	56	48	11 Months and 29 Days
1976	"Gone at Last" (with Charnissa)	49	—	11 Months and 29 Days
1976	"11 Months and 29 Days"	34	—	11 Months and 29 Days
1976	"I Can See Me Lovin' You Again"	44	—	11 Months and 29 Days
1977	"Slide Off of Your Satin Sheets"	7	7	Slide Off Your Satin Sheets
1977	"I'm the Only Hell (Mama Ever Raised)"	8	6	Slide Off Your Satin Sheets
1977	"Take This Job and Shove It"	1	1	Take This Job and Shove It
1978	"Georgia in a Jug"	17	6	Take This Job and Shove It
1978	"Friend, Lover, Wife"	7	8	Armed and Crazy
1979	"The Outlaw's Prayer"^{[C]}	27	29	Armed and Crazy
1979	"Down on the Corner at a Bar Called Kelly's"	94	—	—N/a
1979	"(Stay Away From) The Cocaine Train"	49	34	Everybody's Got a Family
1979	"Drinkin' and Drivin'"	17	23	Everybody's Got a Family
"—" denotes releases that did not chart

=== 1980s–1990s ===
Year	Single	Peak chart positions		Album
Year	Single	US Country	CAN Country	Album
1980	"Fifteen Beers"	40	43	Everybody's Got a Family... Meet Mine
1980	"In Memory of a Memory"	22	35	New York Town
1981	"I Can't Hold Myself in Line" (with Merle Haggard)	41	41	Mr. Hag Told My Story
1981	"Yesterday's News (Just Hit Home Today)"	57	—	Mr. Hag Told My Story
1981	"The Highlight of '81"	75	42	Lovers and Losers
1982	"No Way Out"	69	—	Lovers and Losers
1982	"D.O.A. (Drunk on Arrival)"	88	—	Lovers and Losers
1983	"I Don't Need to Know That Right Now"	—	—	I Don't Need to Know That Right Now
1984	"I Never Got Over You"	30	—	I'm a Survivor
1985	"You're Every Step I Take"	47	49	I'm a Survivor
1985	"Everything Is Changing"	63	—	I'm a Survivor
1986	"Sexy Southern Lady"	—	—	—N/a
1986	"Old Violin"	21	36	Modern Times
1986	"Don't Bury Me 'Til I'm Ready"	49	—	Modern Times
1987	"Come to Me"	56	—	Modern Times
1987	"I Grow Old Too Fast (And Smart Too Slow)"	72	—	Modern Times
1988	"Out of Beer"	81	—	—N/a
1988	"Josie"	—	—	—N/a
1989	"Scars"	90	—	Outlaw at the Cross
1994	"There Lies the Difference"	—	—	The Difference in Me
"—" denotes releases that did not chart

== Other singles ==
=== Singles with George Jones ===
Year	Single	Peak chart positions		Album
Year	Single	US Country	CAN Country	Album
1978	"Maybellene"	7	4	Double Trouble
1979	"You Can Have Her"	14	26	Double Trouble
1980	"When You're Ugly Like Us (You Just Naturally Got to Be Cool)"	31	29	Double Trouble
1980	"You Better Move On"	18	25	Double Trouble

=== Guest singles ===
Year	Single	Artist	Peak chart positions		Album
Year	Single	Artist	US Country	CAN Country	Album
1972	"Let's All Go Down to the River"	Jody Miller	13	18	There's a Party Goin' On

=== B-Sides ===
Year	B-Side	Peak chart positions		Original A-Side
Year	B-Side	US Country	CAN Country	Original A-Side
1972	"Billy Jack Washburn"	—	79	"Living the Life of a Dog"
1978	"Colorado Kool-Aid"	50	—	"Take This Job and Shove It"
1978	"Me and the I.R.S."	33	—	"Georgia in a Jug"
"—" denotes releases that did not chart

== Notes ==
- A Take This Job and Shove It also peaked at No. 72 on the Billboard 200 and No. 85 on the RPM Top Albums chart in Canada.
- B "She's All I Got" also peaked at No. 91 on the Billboard Hot 100.
- C "The Outlaw's Prayer" also peaked at No. 27 on New Zealand Singles Chart
