= Johnny Paycheck's Greatest Hits (1968 album) =

Compilation album by Johnny Paycheck
- Released: December 1968
- Genre: Country
- Length: 36:59
- Label: Little Darlin' Records
- Producer: Aubrey Mayhew

Johnny Paycheck chronology
Country Soul (1968)	Johnny Paycheck's Greatest Hits (1968)	Wherever You Are (1969)

Singles from Johnny Paycheck's Greatest Hits
- 1. "Don't Monkey with Another Monkey's Monkey" Released: December 23, 1967; 2. "(It Won't be Long) and I'll be Hating You" Released: April 27, 1968; 3. "My Heart Keeps Running to You" Released: August 17, 1968

Professional ratings
Review scores
Source	Rating
AllMusic	3/5 stars

Johnny Paycheck's Greatest Hits is the first compilation album by American country music artist Johnny Paycheck. The album was released in December 1968, via Little Darlin' Records. It was produced by Aubrey Mayhew.

Although the compilation was marketed as a "best of" collection, the track selection and sequencing are largely arbitrary. There's no chronological order, thematic arc, or consistency in mood.

== Track listing ==
Side 1
No.	Title	Writer(s)	Length
1.	"A-11"	Hank Cochran	2:21
2.	"Jukebox Charlie"	Aubrey Mayhew; Johnny Paycheck	2:25
3.	"The Lovin' Machine"	Larry Kingston	2:22
4.	"The Cave"	Kingston	3:34
5.	"Motel Time Again"	Bobby Bare	2:15
6.	"You'll Recover in Time"	Mayhew; Paycheck	4:01
7.	"If You Should Come Back Today"	"Country" Johnny Mathis	2:08

Side 2
No.	Title	Writer(s)	Length
1.	"Don't Monkey with Another Monkey's Monkey"	Dale Morris	2:18
2.	"Ballad of the Green Berets"	Robin Moore; Barry Sadler	3:31
3.	"(Won't Be Long) And I'll Be Hating You"	Mayhew; Paycheck	2:26
4.	"Touch My Heart"	Mayhew; Paycheck	2:46
5.	"My Heart Keeps Running to You"	Ray Buzzeo	2:47
6.	"Yesterday, Today, and Tomorrow"	J. Crawford; Mayhew; Paycheck	2:07
7.	"Fool's Hall of Fame"	Mayhew; Paycheck	2:47
Total length:			36:59

== Personnel ==
- Johnny Paycheck – vocals
- Buddy Spicher – fiddle
- Lloyd Green – pedal steel guitar

== Charts ==
Weekly chart performance for Johnny Paycheck's Greatest Hits
Chart (1968)	Peak position
US Top Country Albums (Billboard)	42
