= New York Town (album) =

Live album by Johnny Paycheck
- Released: September 1980
- Recorded: February 28, 1978
- Studio: Lone Star Cafe (New York, New York)
- Genre: Country
- Length: 31:21
- Label: Epic Records
- Producer: Billy Sherrill

Johnny Paycheck chronology
Double Trouble (1980)	New York Town (1980)	Mr. Hag Told My Story (1981)

Singles from New York Town
- 1. "In Memory of a Memory" Released: September 6, 1980

New York Town: Recorded Live at the Lone Star Cafe is the first live album by American country music artist Johnny Paycheck. The album was released in September 1980 via Epic Records. It was produced by Billy Sherrill. It was recorded at the Lone Star Cafe in New York City.

== Critical reception ==
Professional ratings
Review scores
Source	Rating
AllMusic	4.5/5 stars

Eugene Chadbourne of AllMusic called it "one of the best" live country records, commending the precision of the band and the organic flow of the setlist. Brown Burnett of The Clarion-Ledger lauded the album's restraint in production, noting it was "refreshingly tapered" compared to the overdub-heavy norm of country records. Bill Robertson of The StarPhoenix emphasized how the small club setting benefited the album's sound, highlighting the West Texas Music Company's professionalism and the minimal crowd interference.

Dan Smith of The Roanoke Times said that Paycheck's praise of New York in the title track signaled a new kind of unity in American music and audience reach. However, he also acknowledged that the rest of the album largely consisted of familiar material, and noted that Paycheck often seemed out of place in the city, even as he won over the crowd.

== Track listing ==
Side 1
No.	Title	Writer(s)	Length
1.	"New York Town"	James Talley	3:23
2.	"I'm Ragged but I'm Right"	Traditional	2:00
3.	"She Thinks I Still Care"	Steve Duffy; Dickey Lee	3:45
4.	"Drinkin' and Drivin'"	Gary Gentry	3:08
5.	"I'm the Only Hell (Mama Ever Raised)"	Bobby Borchers; Wayne Kemp	2:10

Side 2
No.	Title	Writer(s)	Length
1.	"In Memory of a Memory"	Johnny Paycheck	3:59
2.	"11 Months and 29 Days"	Paycheck; Billy Sherrill	4:36
3.	"(Stay Away From) the Cocaine Train"	Paycheck	3:05
4.	"Me and the I.R.S."	Don Scaife; Gladys Scaife; Ronny Scaife; Phil Thomas	3:01
5.	"Take This Job and Shove It"	David Allan Coe	3:13
Total length:			31:21

== Personnel ==
- Johnny Paycheck – vocals
- Barry Walsh – piano
- Michael McBride – bass
- Johnnie M. Barber – drums
- P. T. Gazell – harmonica
- Jim Murphy – pedal steel guitar, dobro, saxophone
- Barry Chance – guitar

== Charts ==
Weekly chart performance for New York Town
Chart (1980)	Peak position
US Top Country Albums (Billboard)	48
