= The Valley (Charley Crockett album) =

2019 album by Charley Crockett

Studio album by Charley Crockett
- Released: September 20, 2019
- Studios: Fort Horton (Wyland); Alnico (Austin)
- Genre: Country
- Length: 42:10
- Labels: Son of Davy; Thirty Tigers
- Producers: Charley Crockett; Billy Horton; Jason Moeller

Charley Crockett chronology
| Lil' G.L.'s Blue Bonanza (2018) | The Valley (2019) | Field Recordings, Vol. 1 (2020) |

Alternative cover
- Original 2019 release cover

Singles from The Valley
- 1. "Borrowed Time" Released: July 25, 2019; 2. "The Valley" Released: July 25, 2019

The Valley is the sixth studio album by American singer Charley Crockett, released on September 20, 2019, through Son of Davy and distributed by Thirty Tigers. It was co-produced by Crockett, Billy Horton, and Nate Moeller.

The album's cover art pays tribute to Johnny Paycheck and is based on Paycheck's 1967 album, Jukebox Charlie.

== Critical reception ==
Professional ratings
Review scores
| Source | Rating |
|---|---|
| AllMusic | 4/5 stars |

Stephen Thomas Erlewine of AllMusic wrote that Crockett spent the latter half of the 2010s cranking out albums like he were "attempting to outrun a demon". He would go onto note The Valley does indeed bear the marks of memoir, containing songs about his hardscrabble childhood and colorful journey.

== Track listing ==
The Valley track listing
| No. | Title | Writer(s) | Length |
|---|---|---|---|
| 1. | "Borrowed Time" | Charley Crockett; Evan Felker | 2:32 |
| 2. | "The Valley" | Crockett | 3:19 |
| 3. | "5 More Miles" | Crockett | 2:09 |
| 4. | "Big Gold Mine" | Crockett | 2:16 |
| 5. | "10,000 Acres" | Crockett | 4:05 |
| 6. | "The Way I'm Livin' (Santa Rosa)" | Alexis Sanchez; Crockett | 2:34 |
| 7. | "7 Come 11" | Vincent Neil Emerson | 2:52 |
| 8. | "If Not The Fool" | Crockett | 2:40 |
| 9. | "Excuse Me" | Buck Owens; Harlan Howard | 2:56 |
| 10. | "It's Nothing to Me" | Pat Patterson | 2:50 |
| 11. | "Maybelle" | Crockett | 2:11 |
| 12. | "9 Lb Hammer" | Public Domain | 2:31 |
| 13. | "River Of Sorrow" | Crockett; Kyle Madrigal | 2:30 |
| 14. | "Change Yo' Mind" | Crockett | 2:28 |
| 15. | "Motel Time Again" | Bobby Bare | 3:00 |
| Total length: | | | 42:10 |

== Personnel ==
Musicians

- Charley Crockett – lead vocals, acoustic guitar, banjo
- Alexis Sanchez – lead guitar, rhythm guitar
- Nathan Fleming – pedal steel
- Kullen Fox – piano, backing vocals
- Billy Horton – bass
- Jason Moeller – drums, percussion
- Brennen Leigh – backing vocals
- Noel McKay – backing vocals
- Jeff Dazey – baritone saxophone
- Kyle Nix – fiddle
- Greg Izor – harmonica
- Anthony Farrell – organ

Technical

- Charley Crockett – production
- Billy Horton – production
- Jason Moeller – production
- Jim Wilson – mastering
- Nico Leophonte – assistance

Visuals

- Keith Brogdon – artwork
- Lyza Renee – photography

== Charts ==
Chart performance for The Valley
| Chart (2019) | Peak position |
|---|---|
| US Heatseekers Albums | 16 |
