= Under the Influence (Alan Jackson album) =

Studio album by Alan Jackson
- Released: October 26, 1999
- Genre: Country
- Length: 43:04
- Label: Arista Nashville
- Producer: Keith Stegall

Alan Jackson chronology
Super Hits (1999)	Under the Influence (1999)	When Somebody Loves You (2000)

Singles from Under the Influence
- 1. "Pop a Top" Released: October 4, 1999; 2. "The Blues Man" Released: January 16, 2000; 3. "It Must Be Love" Released: April 24, 2000

Professional ratings
Review scores
Source	Rating
AllMusic	4.5/5 stars
Chicago Tribune	(positive)
Entertainment Weekly	B+
Mojo	(favorable)
No Depression	(favorable)
People	(favorable)
Robert Christgau	(dud)
Rolling Stone	3.5/5 stars

Under the Influence is the eighth studio album by American country music artist Alan Jackson. It was released on October 26, 1999, and features covers of other country artists' material. Three singles were released from Under the Influence; "Pop a Top", "The Blues Man", and "It Must Be Love", which respectively reached No. 6, No. 37, and No. 1 on the Hot Country Songs charts. "My Own Kind of Hat", "Margaritaville" and "She Just Started Liking Cheatin' Songs" also entered the lower regions of the charts from unsolicited airplay.

== Track by track ==
- "Pop a Top": recorded by Jim Ed Brown on his 1967 album Just Jim and was a number three Billboard country single in 1967.
- "Farewell Party": recorded by Gene Watson on his 1978 album Reflections and was a number five country single in 1979.
- "Kiss an Angel Good Mornin'": recorded by Charley Pride on his 1971 album Charley Pride Sings Heart Songs and was a number one country single in 1971.
- "Right in the Palm of Your Hand" was recorded by Mel McDaniel on his 1980 album I'm Countryfied and was a number ten country single in 1981.
- "The Blues Man": recorded by Hank Williams, Jr. on his 1980 album Habits Old and New.
- "Revenooer Man": recorded by George Jones as the B-side of the 1963 single "I Love You Because".
- "My Own Kind of Hat": recorded by Merle Haggard on the 1979 album Serving 190 Proof and became a number four country single in 1979.
- "She Just Started Liking Cheatin' Songs": recorded by John Anderson on the 1980 album John Anderson and was a number thirteen country single in 1980.
- "The Way I Am": recorded by Merle Haggard on the 1980 album The Way I Am and was a number two country single in 1980.
- "It Must Be Love": recorded by Don Williams on the 1978 album Expressions and was a number one country single in 1979.
- "Once You've Had the Best": recorded by Johnny Paycheck on the 1973 album Mr. Lovemaker, later re-recorded George Jones' 1974 album The Grand Tour and was a number three country single in 1973.
- "Margaritaville": recorded by Jimmy Buffett on the 1977 album Changes in Latitudes, Changes in Attitudes and reached number eight on the Billboard Hot 100 in 1977.

== Track listing ==
No.	Title	Writer(s)	Length
1.	"Pop a Top"	Nat Stuckey	3:04
2.	"Farewell Party"	Lawton Williams	4:07
3.	"Kiss an Angel Good Mornin'"	Ben Peters	2:04
4.	"Right in the Palm of Your Hand"	Bob McDill	3:38
5.	"The Blues Man"	Hank Williams Jr.	7:04
6.	"Revenooer Man"	Johnny Paycheck	2:32
7.	"My Own Kind of Hat"	Merle Haggard, Red Lane	3:22
8.	"She Just Started Liking Cheatin' Songs"	Kent Robbins	2:43
9.	"The Way I Am"	Sonny Throckmorton	3:05
10.	"It Must Be Love"	McDill	2:53
11.	"Once You've Had the Best"	Paycheck	4:10
12.	"Margaritaville" (featuring Jimmy Buffett)	Jimmy Buffett	4:15

== Chart performance ==
Under the Influence peaked at No. 9 on the U.S. Billboard 200, and peaked at No. 2 on the Top Country Albums. In December 1999, Under the Influence was certified platinum by the RIAA.

=== Weekly charts ===
Chart (1999)	Peak position
Canadian Albums (RPM)	36
Canadian Country Albums (RPM)	4
US Billboard 200	9
US Top Country Albums (Billboard)	2

=== Year-end charts ===
Chart (1999)	Position
US Top Country Albums (Billboard)	38
Chart (2000)	Position
US Billboard 200	79
US Top Country Albums (Billboard)	8
Chart (2001)	Position
US Top Country Albums (Billboard)	51

== Certifications ==
Certifications for Under the Influence
Region	Certification	Certified units/sales
United States (RIAA)	Platinum	1,000,000^{^}
^{^} Shipments figures based on certification alone.

== Personnel ==
- Alan Jackson – lead vocals
- Jimmy Buffett – vocals on "Margaritaville"
- John Wesley Ryles – backing vocals
- Brent Mason – electric guitar
- Brent Rowan – electric guitar
- Bruce Watkins – acoustic guitar
- John Willis – acoustic guitar
- Michael Rhodes – bass guitar
- Glenn Worf – bass guitar
- Hargus "Pig" Robbins – piano, keyboard
- Gary Prim – piano, keyboard
- Eddie Bayers – drums
- Owen Hale – drums
- Paul Franklin – steel guitar
- Scotty Sanders – steel guitar
- Stuart Duncan – fiddle, mandolin
- Larry Franklin – fiddle
