= Johnny Paycheck's Greatest Hits, Vol. 2 =

Compilation album by Johnny Paycheck
- Released: October 1978
- Genre: Country
- Length: 28:54
- Label: Epic Records
- Producer: Billy Sherrill

Johnny Paycheck chronology
Take This Job and Shove It (1977)	Johnny Paycheck's Greatest Hits, Vol. 2 (1978)	Armed and Crazy (1978)

Johnny Paycheck's Greatest Hits, Vol. 2 is the fourth compilation album by American country music artist Johnny Paycheck. The album was released in October 1978 via Epic Records. It was produced by Billy Sherrill.

The album peaked at number 23 on the Billboard Top Country Albums chart and benefited from Paycheck's commercial peak.

== Critical reception ==
Professional ratings
Review scores
Source	Rating
AllMusic	4.5/5 stars
Christgau's Record Guide	A−

Johnny Paycheck's Greatest Hits, Vol. 2 was well-received by critics. Robert Christgau gave the album an A−, noting that the format effectively stripped away filler and posturing, leaving behind only Paycheck's most hard-hitting and funny outlaw songs. Billy Altman of the New York City Daily News commented on the album's timeliness, noting that while Paycheck had long been prolific, it wasn't until that year that he "came into his own" as a true country star. Altman praised the album for containing "one or two great songs" amid "tons of filler" typical of country releases at the time, but emphasized that the great ones were career-defining tracks.

== Track listing ==
Side 1
No.	Title	Writer(s)	Length
1.	"Take This Job and Shove It"	David Allan Coe	2:35
2.	"11 Months and 29 Days"	Johnny Paycheck; Billy Sherrill	3:45
3.	"I'm the Only Hell (Mama Ever Raised)"	Bobby Borchers; Wayne Kemp	3:10
4.	"Slide Off of Your Satin Sheets"	Wayne Carson; Donn Tankersley	2:57
5.	"Gone at Last" (with Charnissa)	Paul Simon	3:05

Side 2
No.	Title	Writer(s)	Length
1.	"Colorado Kool-Aid"	Phil Thomas	3:35
2.	"Me and the I.R.S."	Don Scaife; Gladys Scaife; Ronny Scaife; Thomas	2:35
3.	"Georgia in a Jug"	Bobby Braddock	2:41
4.	"Loving You Beats All I've Ever Seen"	Paycheck	2:06
5.	"Rhythm Guitar"	Thomas Hill	2:25
Total length:			28:54

== Charts ==
Weekly chart performance for Johnny Paycheck's Greatest Hits, Vol. 2
Chart (1978)	Peak position
US Top Country Albums (Billboard)	23

== Certifications ==
Region	Certification	Certified units/sales
United States (RIAA)	Gold	500,000^{^}
^{^} Shipments figures based on certification alone.
