= Somebody Loves Me (disambiguation) =

"Somebody Loves Me" is a 1924 popular song, with music by George Gershwin, and lyrics by Ballard MacDonald and Buddy DeSylva.

Somebody Loves Me may also refer to:

- Somebody Loves Me (film), a 1952 American comedy-drama musical film
- Somebody Loves Me (Dinah Shore album), 1960
- Somebody Loves Me (Johnny Paycheck album), 1972
- "Somebody Loves Me" (PartyNextDoor and Drake song), 2025
