= Colorado Kool-Aid =

Colorado Kool-Aid may refer to:

- A slang term for Coors Beer
- Colorado Kool-Aid (song), a song by Johnny Paycheck
