= Heartbreak Tennessee =

Single by Johnny Paycheck
- B-side: "Help Me Hank I'm Fallin'"
- Released: 1965
- Recorded: October 1965
- Studio: Nashville, Tennessee
- Genre: Country
- Length: 2:44
- Label: Hilltop Records
- Songwriter: Jack Clement
- Producer: Aubrey Mayhew

Johnny Paycheck singles chronology
"A-11" (1965)	"Heartbreak Tennessee" (1965)	"I'm Barely Hangin' on to Me" (1966)

"Heartbreak Tennessee" is a song by American country music singer Johnny Paycheck. It was released in 1965 as a single. The song was written by Jack Clement and produced by Aubrey Mayhew.

== History ==
Looking to capitalize on the breakthrough success of his 1965 single "A-11," Paycheck released "Heartbreak Tennessee" later that year.

== Critical reception and commercial performance ==
The song peaked at number 40 on the Billboard Hot Country Songs chart, much lower than anticipated after the success of "A-11."

Despite the song's limited chart success, it still received praise for its songwriting and feature of steel guitar.

== Charts ==
Chart performance for "Heartbreak Tennessee"
Chart (1966)	Peak position
US Hot Country Songs (Billboard)	40
