= Johnny Paycheck's Greatest Hits (1974 album) =

Compilation album by Johnny Paycheck
- Released: July 1974
- Genre: Country
- Length: 29:21
- Label: Epic Records
- Producer: Billy Sherrill

Johnny Paycheck chronology
Song and Dance Man (1973)	Johnny Paycheck's Greatest Hits (1974)	Loving You Beats All I've Ever Seen (1975)

Singles from Johnny Paycheck's Greatest Hits
- 1. "Keep on Lovin' Me" Released: July 6, 1974

Professional ratings
Review scores
Source	Rating
Christgau's Record Guide	C+

Johnny Paycheck's Greatest Hits is the second compilation album by American country music artist Johnny Paycheck. The album was released in July 1974, via Epic Records. It was produced by Billy Sherrill.

The album features 11 of Paycheck's most well known songs, all of which except "Keep on Lovin' Me" and "Once You've Had the Best" peaking above 20. "She's All I Got" and "Mr. Lovemaker" were the highest charting songs, both at number two on the Billboard Hot Country Songs chart.

== Track listing ==
Side 1
No.	Title	Writer(s)	Length
1.	"She's All I Got"	Gary U.S. Bonds; Jerry Williams Jr.	2:53
2.	"Someone to Give My Love To"	Jerry Foster; Bill Rice	3:00
3.	"May Part of Forever"	Foster; Rice	2:58
4.	"Love is a Good Thing"	Foster; Rice	2:42
5.	"Song and Dance Man"	Foster; Rice	2:33

Side 2
No.	Title	Writer(s)	Length
1.	"Keep on Lovin' Me"	Will Jennings; Troy Seals	2:30
2.	"Once You've Had the Best"	Johnny Paycheck	2:42
3.	"Somebody Loves Me"	Foster; Rice	2:48
4.	"Mr. Lovemaker"	Paycheck	2:10
5.	"Something About You I Love"	Foster; Rice	2:35
6.	"Let's All Go Down to the River" (with Jody Miller)	Earl Montgomery; Sue Richards	2:30
Total length:			29:21

== Charts ==
Weekly chart performance for Johnny Paycheck's Greatest Hits
Chart (1974)	Peak position
US Top Country Albums (Billboard)	21
