= Lovers and Losers =

Studio album by Johnny Paycheck
- Released: March 1982
- Recorded: 1981
- Studios: Columbia Recording Studio (Nashville, Tennessee)
- Genre: Country
- Length: 27:26
- Label: Epic Records
- Producer: Billy Sherrill

Johnny Paycheck chronology
Encore (1981)	Lovers and Losers (1982)	Biggest Hits (1982)

Singles from Lovers and Losers
- 1. "The Highlight of '81" Released: January 23, 1981; 2. "No Way Out" Released: April 6, 1982; 3. "D.O.A. (Drunk on Arrival)" Released: August 14, 1982

Lovers and Losers is the twenty-second studio album by American country music artist Johnny Paycheck. The album was released in March 1982, via Epic Records, his last studio album with the record label. It was produced by Billy Sherrill.

== Critical reception ==
Professional ratings
Review scores
Source	Rating
Santa Barbara News and Review	4/5 stars

Lovers and Losers received mixed-to-positive reviews from critics. Bill Robertson of The StarPhoenix called it a return to "the fold of the drinkers and the forgiven," describing the songs as consistent, if not groundbreaking, and noting that "these tunes just maintain the standards." Jim McNulty of the Edmonton Journal agreed that the album worked well as a country release, but found some of the lyrics tired and formulaic, writing that Paycheck "has covered some of this ground once too often."

Christopher Evans of the Orlando Sentinel criticized the lyrics as "trite" and the humor as ineffective, suggesting Paycheck had run out of creative options. Patti Fanning of The Boston Globe viewed the album as a thoughtful recalibration: "a tamer, more sedate Paycheck looking back at the wilder times with a hard-won comprehension of the value of loyalty and love."

The Santa Barbara News and Review praised the record for returning to Paycheck's "old fashioned cryin' and dyin'" roots and awarded it four out of five stars, highlighting tracks like "D.O.A. (Drunk on Arrival)," "Loser of the Year," and "She Got the Gold Mine (I Got the Shaft)" as the album's strongest cuts.

== Track listing ==
Side 1
No.	Title	Writer(s)	Length
1.	"D.O.A. (Drunk on Arrival)"	Michael P. Heeney; Ed Hudson; Larry Lee	2:39
2.	"We've All Gone Crazy"	Joe Chambers; Larry Jenkins	3:08
3.	"Gonna Get Right (And Do Somethin' Wrong)"	Chambers; Jenkins	2:13
4.	"Award to an Angel"	Wayne Kemp; Mack Vickery	2:36
5.	"You're the Only Song I Sing Today"	Marvin Brantley; Buzz Rabin	3:17

Side 2
No.	Title	Writer(s)	Length
1.	"The Highlight of '81"	Michael Garvin; Ron Hellard	3:12
2.	"Sharon Rae"	Johnny Paycheck	2:31
3.	"Loser of the Year"	David Chamberlain; Jim Vest	2:42
4.	"No Way Out"	Paycheck	2:14
5.	"She Got the Gold Mine (I Got the Shaft)"	Tim DuBois	2:54
Total length:			27:26
