= Motel Time Again =

Single by Johnny Paycheck

from the album Jukebox Charlie
- B-side: "If You Should Come Back Today"
- Released: November 5, 1966
- Recorded: August 1966
- Genre: Country
- Length: 2:14
- Label: Little Darlin' Records
- Songwriter: Bobby Bare
- Producer: Aubrey Mayhew

Johnny Paycheck singles chronology
"Right Back Where We Parted" (1966)	"Motel Time Again" (1966)	"Jukebox Charlie" (1967)

"Motel Time Again" is a song by American country music singer Johnny Paycheck. It was released on November 5, 1966, as a single from his fourth studio album Jukebox Charlie. The song was written by Bobby Bare and produced by Aubrey Mayhew.

The song was a regular staple of Paycheck's live shows alongside "Apartment No. 9" and "A-11."

== Charts ==
Chart performance for "Motel Time Again"
Chart (1967)	Peak position
US Hot Country Songs (Billboard)	13
