= Again (Johnny Paycheck album) =

Studio album by Johnny Paycheck
- Released: 1970
- Recorded: April 1970
- Studio: Hilltop Recording Studio (Nashville, Tennessee)
- Genre: Country
- Length: 33:28
- Label: Certron
- Producer: Aubrey Mayhew

Johnny Paycheck chronology
| Wherever You Are (1969) | Again (1970) | She's All I Got (1971) |

Again is the seventh studio album by American country music artist Johnny Paycheck. The album was released in 1970, via Certron Corporation, Paycheck's only release under the record. It was produced by Aubrey Mayhew.

It is Paycheck's last album with Mayhew as his producer.

== Release and reception ==
Professional ratings
Review scores
| Source | Rating |
|---|---|
| AllMusic | 3.5/5 stars |

In an AllMusic review, Dan Cooper states: "Post-Little Darlin', but still Mayhew-produced, he keeps right on kicking. Included is "Living the Life of a Dog," a hilarious romp that probably had multiple meanings for Paycheck." The writers of Cashbox magazine stated that "Johnny Paycheck's sizable following of fans should find plenty to interest them in this new album release", noting that "The veteran Country singer is in fine form for such tracks as "Forever Ended Yesterday," "I Don't Know When That Will Be," "Honky Tonks And Slow Sad Music," "It's For Sure I Can't Go On," "Sunny Side of the Mountain," and "My Sweet Love Ain't Around." Billboard's writers claimed Paycheck "offers the usual outstanding performances" on the record. Record World stated Paycheck "has a good collection of tunes".

== Track listing ==
Side 1
| No. | Title | Writer(s) | Length |
|---|---|---|---|
| 1. | "Forever Ended Yesterday" | Aubrey Mayhew | 2:45 |
| 2. | "I Feel like Crying" | Werly Fairburn | 2:57 |
| 3. | "I Don't Know When That Will Be" | "Country" Johnny Mathis | 2:19 |
| 4. | "Julie" | Bob Morris | 3:46 |
| 5. | "My Sweet Love Ain't Around" | Hank Williams | 2:53 |
| 6. | "I've Got Wine on My Mind" | Bobby George; Carl Walden | 2:52 |

Side 2
| No. | Title | Writer(s) | Length |
|---|---|---|---|
| 1. | "Keeping Up With the Joneses" | Dale Morris; Johnny Paycheck | 2:58 |
| 2. | "Sunny Side of the Mountain" | Bobby Gregory; Harry McAuliffe | 2:07 |
| 3. | "Living the Life of a Dog" | Bill Eldridge; Gary Stewart | 2:38 |
| 4. | "Talk About Me" | Junior Keith | 2:49 |
| 5. | "Honky Tonks and Slow Sad Music" | D. Morris | 2:52 |
| 6. | "It's For Sure I Can't Go On" | Mayhew | 2:32 |
| Total length: | | | 33:28 |
