= Joe Chambers (musician) =

American musician and producer (1954–2022)

- Born: July 27, 1954; Columbus, Georgia
- Died: September 28, 2022 (aged 68); Nashville, Tennessee
- Occupations: Musician, Songwriter, Producer, Entrepreneur, Founder/CEO Musicians Hall of Fame and Museum
- Years active: 1968–2022
- Spouse: Linda Woods (m. 1980)

Joseph Frank Chambers (July 27, 1954 – September 28, 2022) was an American musician, songwriter, record producer, A&R executive, musical stores entrepreneur, and co-founder and CEO of the Musician's Hall of Fame and Museum (MHOFM) in Nashville, Tennessee.

In 1978 at Nashville, TN Joe met songwriter, producer, and Epic Records President Billy Sherrill. Sherrill became Chambers' mentor for songwriting, record producing, and artists and repertoire (A&R) at CBS Records. Sherrill passed on his knowledge and experience to Joe. Chambers wrote songs that were recorded by famous Country singers including several that were hit songs. Sherrill let Joe shadow him during many record producing projects. Through this mentoring, Chambers met and made friends with some of the great session musicians in Nashville. In 1985 Chambers opened a small chain of music stores in the Nashville area. Later Joe bought and sold vintage guitars for famous musicians. In November 2003, Joe and his wife Linda co-founded the future Musicians Hall of Fame and Museum. After two and half years of renovating, it opened to the public in June 2006.

== Early life ==
Chambers was born on July 27, 1954, in Columbus, Georgia. His father was Frank Chambers (October 30, 1910 – August 17, 2004) and his mother was Eugenia Brooks Chambers (December 8, 1920 – September 20, 2004).

=== 1969–1978 Musician ===
In the summer of 1969 Joe played guitar in the rock and roll band he founded (The Soul Proprietors) at age 14 in Columbus, Georgia. The band won the local Jaycees-Sponsored Battle of the Bands in his senior year in high school, and went on to win first place at the Nationals Battle of the Bands in September 1973. Chambers started writing songs at this time. The band continued to play around Georgia and nearby states.

The band occasionally visited the keyboard player's uncle who managed country singer Conway Twitty. Twitty was good friends with Dick Clark, and the band hoped Clark could be a path to a rock and roll career. Around 1976 Twitty offered to oversee the band recording a demo tape in Oklahoma City, Twitty's home at the time. Twitty then sent Clark the demo. Clark listened to the tape and chose one song as the best. That song was written by Chambers (music and lyrics) and this gave him confidence to continue writing. In 1978 the band recorded another demo in Atlanta. Chambers and two other band members took the demo to Music Row. They stopped at CBS Records and by chance encounter in the lobby, met Billy Sherrill who was president of Epic Records (a unit of CBS). Chambers did not realize at the time how influential Sherrill was, but Joe asked him to listen to the demo. Sherrill agreed on the spot and invited the three musicians to his office. Sherrill liked the demo and, in a week, the whole band was in Nashville recording with CBS. This meeting and connection with Sherrill changed Chambers' life. Billy Sherrill and Conway Twitty looked after Chambers and helped him. Chambers said "Billy ended up being my second dad".

=== 1978–1985 Songwriter and producer ===
Sherrill mentored Chambers and passed on his experience and expertise in the recording studio. Joe learned Billy's technique of producing and became friends with Nashville's A-Team studio session musicians. As Chambers watched Sherrill conduct recording sessions for Charlie Rich, Johnny Paycheck, George Jones, Elvis Costello, Ray Charles, Marty Robbins, Tammy Wynette and others, he became fascinated by the skills of the session musicians.

Twitty and Sherrill also listened to Chambers' songwriting and when his songs were good, they started to record some of them. Sherrill gave Joe a job at CBS and signed him as a staff songwriter. Joe's songs were recorded by many famous Country singers including George Jones, Johnny Paycheck, and B.J. Thomas. Chambers' well-known copyrights included “Somebody Lied” (Ricky Van Shelton's first number one record, 1987).

Chambers said in an interview "When my songs started to be recorded, CBS hired me and I got to start producing records. I used the same session musicians Billy Sherrill used [such as]; Pete Drake (pedal steel guitar), Kenny Buttrey (drums), 'Pig' Robbins (piano), Bob Moore (bass), Henry Strzelecki (bass), and Charlie McCoy (harmonica and guitar). Just all the great players." Chambers produced recordings that charted in the top 100 for various artists, on CBS Records, MCA Records, Mercury Records, or Capitol Records.

=== 1985–2004 Chambers Guitars ===
In 1985, Joe and his wife Linda Chambers opened a guitar store, Chambers Guitars. This soon expanded into a small chain of instrument stores, which opened doors to meet musicians in pop and rock n' roll genres. Eventually there were Tennessee locations in Smyrna, Murfreesboro, Franklin, Nashville, and Bowling Green, Kentucky. Joe entered the vintage guitar market and met and made friends with famous musicians.

== Musicians Hall of Fame and Museum ==
=== The Dream of the Musicians Hall of Fame and Museum ===
Chambers met the great session musicians, saw the music industry as a writer, a producer, a musician, and as an entrepreneur with guitar stores.^{[4]} Joe said "[I] knew about studio musicians because I was lucky enough to be able to hang with [them]. I had some guitar stores so we sold guitars to everyone and when I got into the vintage guitar market, I ended up selling [to] and knowing people who were selling guitars to the [Rolling] Stones and The Who and Crosby Stills and Nash and Young. Not because of anything I did incredible, [or] because I was a great musician, or wrote anything. It was just because I was dealing in guitars. [For] many of these people, it's just who you know. So I got invited to hang out with these people."

The idea for a museum to recognize the contributions of the musicians was first imagined by Chambers as a television show. Chambers imagined a television show that would interview session musicians aimed at musicians and people who weren't musicians but would be interested in stories about the musicians associated with the stars . Chet Atkins and other colleagues said they thought it was a good idea. However, Joe didn't have the "backing or the knowledge to pull it off" and the TV show didn not happen. This idea then morphed into a brick and mortar that he could tell the same stories in a museum.

The trigger for Joe to begin the project was related to the early days of the career of Jimi Hendrix. He had spent a significant amount of time (c. 1962 - mid 1965) in Nashville prior to being discovered by Chas Chandler and moving to England. Jimi and Billy Cox lived on the second floor of Joyce's House of Glamour on Jefferson St. during this period. Years later, the house was still intact, but was demolished during the construction of the Interstate across Jefferson Street. Chambers realized that it could have been a worldwide attraction, but either no one knew about it, or no one had the ability to save it. This made him think he should open up a museum to honor Nashville musicians. While the project progressed, Chambers realized that it should include all musicians in a museum that was located in Nashville; The Musicians Hall of Fame and Museum (MHOFM).

=== First museum ===
Main articles: Musicians Hall of Fame and Museum

In November 2003, Joe and his wife Linda co-founded the future Musicians Hall of Fame and Museum. They purchased a 30,000 square foot building at 301 6th Ave. S., Nashville, Tennessee across from the Country Music Hall of Fame in Nashville, TN and began renovating. After two and half years of renovating, they opened the MHOFM to the public in June 2006. Exhibits consisted of instruments owned and played by well-known artists as well as behind-the-scenes session musicians. The 30,000-square-foot facility was unique in the world, and its annual awards galas were star-studded affairs. The museum was voted venue of the year by the Meeting Professionals International in 2008.

But in 2009–10, the city of Nashville took the building (under the rules of eminent domain) to construct the Music City Center. They stored the artifacts, which were then damaged in the 2010 Nashville flood.

=== Current museum ===
In 2013, the museum found a new home in the spacious old exhibit hall of Municipal Auditorium, which more than doubled its size. On August 29, 2013, the MHOFM reopened on the first floor of the historic Nashville Municipal Auditorium just off the James Robertson Parkway exit at 401 Gay Street, Nashville, TN 37219. The 200,000 square foot building houses the historic 10,000-seat Municipal Auditorium. The 68,000 sq. ft. exhibit floor, which was also Nashville's first convention center, now houses the museum and its artifacts.

==== Museum acquisitions ====
The first artifact the museum acquired was the piano that was in Billy Sherrill's office in the CBS Records building (when he bought a new baby grand). The piano had been in Sherrill's office when Chambers first met him in 1978. An untold number of musicians, singers, and songwriters sat at this piano. Some of the classic songs that were written or co-written by Sherrill at this piano include "Stand by Your Man", "The Most Beautiful Girl", "Almost Persuaded", "Too Far Gone" (written by Sherrill for Elvis Costello album Almost Blue), and George Jones' song "The Door".

Joe's favorite acquisitions include the entire stage from the Jolly Roger club in Nashville, the vocal booth and "a lot of the interior" from the American Sound Studio in Memphis, and a 40-foot-long semi-trailer converted into a mobile recording studio by musician and producer Brian Ahern.

===== Jolly Roger Club =====
The Jolly Roger Club in Printers Alley was a place where Jimi Hendrix played frequently before he became famous. The location was slated for construction of condominiums [in *** year] and Joe called the owner repeatably for a year and a half asking to salvage it prior to demolition. He called one more time, by chance the day the demolition was in progress and the owner said "go down there and get whatever you want." He had his crew cut out everything, the walls, the ceiling beams, the doors and the stage. Then reassembled the room in the museum and it is one of the favorite exhibitions.

===== American Sound Studio =====
American Sound Studio was started in 1964 at 827 Thomas Street in North Memphis, Tennessee and operated from 1964 to 1972. More than one hundred hit songs were recorded, with backing provided by the studio musicians "The Memphis Boys", also known as the "827 Thomas Street Band". Artists who recorded iconic hit songs at American Recording Studio's included Elvis Presley (Suspicious Minds, In the Ghetto, Kentucky Rain), Neil Diamond (Sweet Caroline), Dusty Springfield (Son of a Preacher Man), The Box Tops (The Letter) and many others. When the studio closed in 1972, "the owner had his son remove the vocal booth and the walls and ceilings and store in a tractor trailer about 60 miles west of Memphis." This material was stored for 35 years until Chambers acquired it and reassembled it in the museum.

===== Brian Ahern Custom Built Mobile Recording Studio - The Enactron Truck =====
In response to a question in a rare interview "How did that [Enactron Truck] come about?"; Ahern said "It was inspired by an image that had come to me in my sleep. About 1971, I got up on the garage roof...with all the card board and plywood I could gather from the neighborhood and built the interior of a mobile unit. I changed it until I got it the way I liked it. I then called up a young architect to come over and draw it before the wind blew it down. I wanted to have some tools that I could count on that were constant. At the time, a typical mobile unit was a cluster of equipment strapped down and wired together in a box on wheels. I wanted to have a working environment, fixed and comfortable inside, but very portable." So, he bought a 8x42-foot semi-truck trailer (he always rented a tractor when driving to a project). The Enactron Truck mobile studio was involved with more than 40 gold or platinum songs (including Willie Nelson "Stardust", Bette Midler "The Rose", Barbra Streisand "A Star Is Born").^{[}^{11]} According to Chambers "In 2012 Brian called me one day and said 'I'm done with the trailer.' so I bought it for the Museum. Luckily the Historic Nashville Municipal Auditorium had high ceilings enough, with the air out of the tires. We built walls around it and got the exhibit open for the public around 2018. It is a permanent exhibition in the Museum."^{[4]}

== Backstage Video Interviews with Great Musicians ==
While Joe was the co-founder of MHOFM, the video interviews with great musicians were solely conducted by Chambers. For most of the single camera interviews, Joe set up the sound and video, researched information, and prepared the questions.

=== Early Single Camera Interviews - The Musicians Hall of Fame Backstage The Vault Series 2004-2019 ===
There are two different interview formats that Chambers used. The early shows, began in 2004 (about 2 years before the original MHOFM opened. Joe said during an interview "I visited many museums and I noticed all of them had video screens with about 2-minute interviews. During this time, we were renovating the building that took about 2.5 years [the original Museum opened June, 2006]. I bought a single video camera and conducted interviews [with musicians]. The original intention was to show short clips in the museum. I went all over the country; New York, Los Angeles, Detroit, Muscle Shoals, everywhere possible, to interview all the great musicians I could. I was not a great camera man or a great soundman but I got these long interviews on film, with the intent that they would be shown only in the museum. I intended to edit short clips, the best 2 minutes or so, because I didn't think people would want to stand and watch very long in a big museum. But I filmed these interviews, if it was interesting I never stopped rolling."^{[4]}

This group of interviews is named Musicians Hall of Fame Backstage - From the Vault Series. These interviews consist of a single video camera in front of Joe (he is not seen). "I didn't even want you to hear my voice, I just wanted to hear them. Luckily, looking back on it, you could hear my voice fairly well."^{[4]} The musicians that were interviewed sometimes repeated the questions (Joe is not heard) during these shows. Sometimes Joe can be heard clearly asking the questions during other interviews.

Joe typically travelled to meet the musicians in many places throughout the country during the renovation of the original Museum building. After the original location opened in June 2006, musicians would come into the MHOFM and Chambers would interview them there until the original building was forced to close due to eminent domain. During the construction of the current Museum building Joe would travel to continue interviewing great musicians until the new MHOFM opened in August, 2013.^{[4]}

=== Recent Multi-Camera Interviews - The Musicians Hall of Fame Backstage Series 2019-2022 ===
The recent interview format involved three cameras, a designated recording booth on the Front Stage of the reopened MHOFM (located on the first floor of the historic Nashville Municipal Auditorium), and an artistic backdrop consisting of about 300 guitars attached to the big curved wall. Production of the Backstage Series interviews started at the reopened MHOFM early 2016. Interviews were generally 30 min, or 60 min that are frequently split into part 1 and part 2 each 30 min long. Joe interacted on-camera with the musicians to ask questions, and often shared common memories and other stories with the interviewed musicians.^{[4]}

"When Covid 19 came in, nobody wanted to do any interviews sitting across from somebody. We were really rolling well when we had to stop. One day Don McLean's manager called and he would like to be on a show. I said if you are up for it, I am sick of sitting at home, too. This was before either of us had shots and we he came in and we did an interview (September 19, 2020), and then one of my favorite people, Vince Gill, came in and we did an interview (November 7, 2020). Then Emmylou Harris, Greta Van Fleet, and Joe Bonamassa, and that kind of started it all back again."^{[4]} Joe Chambers continued to interview great musicians until May 3, 21.

=== All Interviews Videos Prepared for YouTube for all People Around the World ===
One of the most important goals of the Backstage interviews was to let people know where the reopened MHOFM is located. Chambers "aired [MHOFM Backstage interviews] on the local [Nashville] TV station; Newschannel 5+, the digital channel." Backstage shows first aired in June 2019. "[We] noticed that they were airing the shows on their YouTube channel and they were getting a lot of views. So, we put our Backstage shows on the Museum YouTube channel. We got more than 91,000 subscribers and almost 13M views (while YouTube view counts are not considered accurate, they can provide a sense of the popularity or reach of a video) in the last 15 months [March, 2020 through June, 2021]. More people know about the Museum now than they ever have all around the world."^{[4]}

== Personal life ==
Joe married Linda Woods on September 13, 1980. Joe Chambers died on September 28, 2022, at Vanderbilt Hospital following an extended illness.
