= When You're Ugly Like Us (You Just Naturally Got to Be Cool) =

Single by George Jones & Johnny Paycheck

from the album Double Trouble
- B-side: "Kansas City"
- Released: 1980
- Recorded: 1980
- Genre: Country
- Length: 2:20
- Label: Epic
- Songwriter(s): Don Goodman, Rick Schulman
- Producer(s): Billy Sherrill

George Jones & Johnny Paycheck singles chronology
"You Can Have Her" (1979)	"When You're Ugly Like Us (You Just Naturally Got to Be Cool)" (1980)	"You Better Move On" (1980)

"When You're Ugly Like Us (You Just Naturally Got to Be Cool)" is song composed by Don Goodman and Rick Schulman and recorded as a duet by American country singers George Jones and Johnny Paycheck. It was released as a single in 1980 on Epic and was chosen as the opening track to their only duet album together, Double Trouble, also released that year, which contained two previous hit singles, "Maybellene" and "You Can Have Her." The song set the tone for what would follow on the LP: a deranged, booze and drug-fueled blowout, with the singers hooting and yelping at each other as if unaware they are being recorded. Profiling the song in the July 2013 issue of Uncut, Andrew Mueller asserted, "It is easy to believe that the slurred, stuttering vocals were no theatrical contrivance." The single bombed, peaking at #31 on the Billboard country singles chart.

== Chart performance ==
Chart (1980)	Peak position
U.S. Billboard Hot Country Singles	31
Canadian RPM Country Tracks	29
