= Country Soul (Johnny Paycheck album) =

Studio album by Johnny Paycheck
- Released: May 1968
- Recorded: April 1967, February 1968
- Genre: Country
- Length: 32:05
- Label: Little Darlin' Records
- Producer: Aubrey Mayhew

Johnny Paycheck chronology
Jukebox Charlie (1967)	Country Soul (1968)	Johnny Paycheck's Greatest Hits (1968)

Professional ratings
Review scores
Source	Rating
AllMusic	2.5/5 stars

Country Soul is the fifth studio album by American country music artist Johnny Paycheck. The album was released in May 1968, via Little Darlin' Records. It was produced by Aubrey Mayhew.

The album consists of mostly cover songs from the mid-1960s with the exception of two songs co-written by Paycheck with "Apartment No. 9" and "Touch My Heart."

== Track listing ==
Side 1
No.	Title	Writer(s)	Length
1.	"There Goes My Everything"	Dallas Frazier	2:38
2.	"Release Me"	Eddie Miller; James Pebworth; Robert Yount	2:28
3.	"Together Again"	Buck Owens	2:15
4.	"Touch My Heart Again"	Aubrey Mayhew; Johnny Paycheck	2:45
5.	"All the Time"	Mel Tillis; Wayne Walker	2:40
6.	"Misty Blue"	Bob Montgomery	2:23

Side 2
No.	Title	Writer(s)	Length
1.	"Apartment No. 9"	Bobby Austin; Paycheck	2:23
2.	"Almost Persuaded"	Billy Sherrill; Glenn Sutton	3:05
3.	"It's Such a Pretty World Today"	Dale Noe	2:07
4.	"Danny Boy"	Frederic Weatherly	3:35
5.	"Make the World Go Away"	Hank Cochran	2:28
6.	"Green, Green Grass of Home"	Curly Putman	3:18
Total length:			32:05

== Charts ==
Weekly chart performance for Country Soul
Chart (1968)	Peak position
US Top Country Albums (Billboard)	41
