= Gospeltime in My Fashion =

Studio album by Johnny Paycheck
- Released: May 1967
- Recorded: May 1966
- Studio: RCA Studio A (Nashville, Tennessee)
- Genre: Country; gospel
- Length: 34:30
- Label: Little Darlin'
- Producer: Aubrey Mayhew

Johnny Paycheck chronology
The Lovin' Machine (1966)	Gospeltime in My Fashion (1967)	Jukebox Charlie (1967)

Professional ratings
Review scores
Source	Rating
AllMusic	3.5/5 stars

Gospeltime in My Fashion is the third studio album by American country music artist Johnny Paycheck. The album was released in March 1967 via Little Darlin' Records. It was produced by Aubrey Mayhew. It is Paycheck's first gospel album.

Paycheck was primarily known for his honky-tonk drinking songs and hard-edged ballads; however Gospeltime in My Fashion marked a distinct detour into gospel music.

== Track listing ==
Side 1
No.	Title	Writer(s)	Length
1.	"I'm On My Way Home"	"Country" Johnny Mathis	2:45
2.	"I'm Better Off"	Wendy Bagwell	1:55
3.	"Black Sheep"	Mathis	2:45
4.	"Every Minute I Want Jesus"	Mathis	2:56
5.	"I'm Gonna Tell All the World"	Mathis	1:30
6.	"Her Crown She Has Won"	Micki Evans	2:45
7.	"Almost Persuaded"	Traditional	2:40

Side 2
No.	Title	Writer(s)	Length
1.	"The Old Rugged Cross"	Traditional	3:40
2.	"In the Garden"	Traditional	3:00
3.	"Just a Closer Walk with Thee"	Traditional	3:00
4.	"When the Roll Is Called Up Yonder"	Traditional	1:35
5.	"Old Time Religion"	Traditional	1:32
6.	"Amazing Grace"	Traditional	2:20
7.	"Jesus Loves Me"	Traditional	2:07
Total length:			34:30
