= The Lovin' Machine =

Studio album by Johnny Paycheck
- Released: July 1966
- Recorded: February and April 1966
- Studio: RCA Studio A (Nashville, Tennessee); RCA Studios New York (New York, New York)
- Genre: Country; honky-tonk
- Length: 31:34
- Label: Little Darlin' Records
- Producer: Aubrey Mayhew

Johnny Paycheck chronology
| At Carnegie Hall (1966) | The Lovin' Machine (1966) | Gospeltime in My Fashion (1967) |

Singles from At Carnegie Hall
- 1. "The Lovin' Machine" Released: June 4, 1966

Reissue cover

Professional ratings
Review scores
| Source | Rating |
|---|---|
| AllMusic | 5/5 stars |

The Lovin' Machine is the second studio album by American country music artist Johnny Paycheck. The album was released in July 1966 via Little Darlin' Records. It was produced by Aubrey Mayhew.

Before the album's release, Paycheck released "The Lovin' Machine", which became his biggest hit up to that point.

Thom Jurek of AllMusic described The Lovin' Machine as a "true masterpiece".

== Track listing ==
Side 1
| No. | Title | Writer(s) | Length |
|---|---|---|---|
| 1. | "The Lovin' Machine" | Larry Kingston | 2:30 |
| 2. | "Miller's Cave" | Jack Clement | 3:12 |
| 3. | "Florence Jean" | "Country" Johnny Mathis | 2:39 |
| 4. | "Hang On Sally" | Kingston | 2:10 |
| 5. | "Is That All I Meant to You" | Woody Guthrie | 2:05 |
| 6. | "I've Got Someone to Kill" | Donald Lytle; Aubrey Mayhew | 2:31 |
| 7. | "I Want You to Know" | Mathis | 2:21 |

Side 2
| No. | Title | Writer(s) | Length |
|---|---|---|---|
| 1. | "Swinging Doors" | Merle Haggard | 2:29 |
| 2. | "We're the Kind of People" | Lytle; Mayhew | 2:42 |
| 3. | "The Johnson's of Turkey Ridge" | Lytle; Mayhew | 1:57 |
| 4. | "Between Love and Hate" | Lytle; Mayhew | 2:50 |
| 5. | "Don't You Say Nothin' at All" | Lytle; Mayhew | 2:20 |
| 6. | "I Don't Know What Keeps Us Together" | Lytle; Mayhew | 2:04 |
| 7. | "I Know I Never Will" | Mathis | 2:35 |
| Total length: | | | 31:34 |

Paycheck is a co-writer credited under his birth name, Donald Lytle, on "I've Got Someone to Kill," "We're the Kind of People," "The Johnson's of Turkey Ridge," "Between Love and Hate," "Don't You Say Nothin' at All," and "I Don't Know What Keeps Us Together."
