= Wherever You Are (Johnny Paycheck album) =

Studio album by Johnny Paycheck
- Released: November 1969
- Recorded: April 1, 1966, September 1968, February and August 1969
- Genre: Country
- Length: 32:55
- Label: Little Darlin' Records
- Producer: Aubrey Mayhew

Johnny Paycheck chronology
| Johnny Paycheck's Greatest Hits (1968) | Wherever You Are (1969) | Again (1970) |

Singles from Wherever You Are
- 1. "If I'm Gonna Sink" Released: December 14, 1968; 2. "My World of Memories" Released: 1969; 3. "Wherever You Are" Released: June 28, 1969; 4. "Wildfire" Released: 1969

Wherever You Are is the sixth studio album by American country music artist Johnny Paycheck. The album was released in November 1969, via Little Darlin' Records. It was produced by Aubrey Mayhew.

It is Paycheck's last album with Little Darlin', as they went out of business after the album's release.

Professional ratings
Review scores
| Source | Rating |
|---|---|
| AllMusic | 4/5 stars |

== Track listing ==
Side 1
| No. | Title | Writer(s) | Length |
|---|---|---|---|
| 1. | "Wherever You Are" | Aubrey Mayhew; Johnny Paycheck | 3:20 |
| 2. | "That's the Story" | Cy Coben | 2:47 |
| 3. | "You Tell Me Your Troubles" | Clyde Mattocks; Dale Morris | 2:44 |
| 4. | "If I'm Gonna Sink" | Mayhew; Paycheck | 2:40 |
| 5. | "My World of Memories" | Mayhew; Paycheck | 2:40 |
| 6. | "The Loser" | Mayhew; Paycheck | 2:24 |

Side 2
| No. | Title | Writer(s) | Length |
|---|---|---|---|
| 1. | "Everything You Touch Turns to Hurt" | Mayhew; Paycheck | 2:54 |
| 2. | "Where All Good Daddys Go" | Mayhew | 2:45 |
| 3. | "California Dream" | Mayhew | 2:15 |
| 4. | "There's No Easy Ways to Die" | Mayhew | 2:38 |
| 5. | "Step Into My Soul" | Mayhew; Paycheck | 3:08 |
| 6. | "Wildfire" | Mayhew | 2:40 |
| Total length: | | | 32:55 |
