= Modern Times (Johnny Paycheck album) =

Studio album by Johnny Paycheck
- Released: March 1987
- Recorded: February, August, and November 1986
- Studio: Studio By The Pond (Hendersonville, Tennessee); Doc's Place (Hendersonville, Tennessee); Southern Tracks Studio (Atlanta, Georgia); Muscle Shoals Sound Studio (Sheffield, Alabama); East Avalon Recorders (Muscle Shoals, Alabama)
- Genre: Country
- Length: 34:37
- Label: Mercury Records
- Producer: Hilka Maria Cornelius; Stan Cornelius; Johnny Paycheck

Johnny Paycheck chronology
I Don’t Need To Know That Right Now (1983)	Modern Times (1987)	Outlaw at the Cross (1988)

Singles from Modern Times
- 1. "Old Violin" Released: May 17, 1986; 2. "Don't Bury Me 'Til I'm Ready" Released: November 8, 1986; 3. "Come to Me" Released: February 28, 1987; 4. "I Grow Old Too Fast (and Smart Too Slow)" Released: July 11, 1987

Modern Times is the twenty-fourth studio album by American country music artist Johnny Paycheck. The album was released in March 1987, via Mercury Records, his only release for the record. It was produced by Stan Cornelius with additional production by Paycheck and Hilka Maria Cornelius.

Modern Times was Paycheck's final album to chart, peaking at 54 on the Billboard Top Country Albums chart.

== Critical reception ==
Professional ratings
Review scores
Source	Rating
AllMusic	4.5/5 stars
The Salinas Californian	4/5 stars
Lincoln Journal Star	5/5 stars

Modern Times received praise from critics upon release, many of whom viewed it as one of Paycheck's finest efforts. Bob Claypool of the Houston Post called it "a solid winner" and celebrated Paycheck's remarkable resilience, writing, "God bless Johnny Paycheck, they oughta build a statue to him!" Wayne Bledsoe of the Knoxville News Sentinel praised the album's expressiveness and restraint, singling out "Old Violin" as a "gut-wrenching masterpiece" that placed Paycheck in the same emotional territory as George Jones.

Cliff Radel of The Salinas Californian gave the album four out of five stars and emphasized the quality of the songwriting, proclaiming Modern Times "has more great lines per tune than any country record made in the last five years." L. Kent Wolgamott of the Lincoln Journal Star gave the album a perfect score, calling it a "mournful country masterpiece," comparing Paycheck's delivery to George Jones.

== Track listing ==
Side 1
No.	Title	Writer(s)	Length
1.	"Modern Times"	Carl Jackson; Glenn Sutton	2:33
2.	"Don't Bury Me 'Till I'm Ready"	John Moffat	3:17
3.	"Come to Me"	Hilka Maria Cornelius	3:44
4.	"Butterflies and Babies"	Cornelius	5:10
5.	"Caught Between a Rock and a Soft Place"	Cornelius; Tommy Dodson; Glen Perkins	3:13

Side 2
No.	Title	Writer(s)	Length
1.	"Jole Blon"	Moon Mullican	3:00
2.	"Old Violin"	Johnny Paycheck	3:43
3.	"She Don't Love Me All the Time"	Dodson; Perkins	3:12
4.	"The Other Man"	Buck Moore	3:00
5.	"I Grow Old Too Fast (And Smart Too Slow)"	John Long	3:45
Total length:			34:37

== Personnel ==
- Johnny Paycheck – vocals, harmony vocals, co-producer ("Old Violin")
- Bessyl Duhon – accordion
- Ava Aldridge – background vocals
- Cindy Greene – background vocals
- Cindy Richardson Walker – background vocals
- Carl Jackson – banjo, harmony vocals ("Modern Times")
- Dave Pomeroy – bass
- Mark Evans – bass
- Ralph Ezell – bass
- Danny Breeden – drums
- Jerry Kroon – drums
- Owen Hale – drums
- Buddy Spicher – fiddle
- Kenny Sears – fiddle
- Bobby Blackford – guitar, keyboard
- Fred Carter Jr. – guitar
- Gregg Galbraith – guitar
- John Long – guitar
- Ray Flacke – guitar
- Mark Casstevens – harmonica
- Jerry Pearson – keyboard
- Johnny Neel – keyboard
- Steve Nathan – keyboard
- Paul Franklin – dobro, steel guitar
- Jimmy Hall – vocals ("Jole Blon"), saxophone
- Chuck Mandes – steel guitar
- Stan Cornelius – producer, bass vocals ("I Grow Old Too Fast (and Smart Too Slow)")
- Hilka Maria Cornelius – co-producer ("Don't Bury Me 'Till I'm Ready"), tambourine
- Claudia Mize – production coordinator
- Steve Popovich – executive producer
- Dave Cline – engineer
- Peter Green – engineer
- Russ Fowler – engineer
- Steve Chandler – engineer
- Steve Melton – engineer
- E. J. Walsh – assistant engineer
- Stephanie Moore – assistant engineer
- Empire Studio – photography
- Bill Brunt – art direction

== Charts ==
Weekly chart performance for Modern Times
Chart (1987)	Peak position
US Top Country Albums (Billboard)	54
