= At Carnegie Hall (Johnny Paycheck album) =

Studio album by Johnny Paycheck
- Released: April 1, 1966
- Studio: RCA Studio A (Nashville, Tennessee)
- Genre: Country
- Length: 36:15
- Label: Little Darlin' Records
- Producer: Aubrey Mayhew

Johnny Paycheck chronology
At Carnegie Hall (1966)	The Lovin' Machine (1966)

Singles from At Carnegie Hall
- 1. "Ballad of the Green Berets" Released: August 1966

Reissue cover

Professional ratings
Review scores
Source	Rating
Allmusic	4.5/5 stars

At Carnegie Hall is the debut studio album by American country music artist Johnny Paycheck. The album was released on April 1, 1966, via Little Darlin' Records. It was produced by Aubrey Mayhew.

Despite the album's title, At Carnegie Hall is a studio album that features the material played in a recent concert he had performed in New York City at Carnegie Hall.

== Background and recording ==
Paycheck worked as a bass player and harmony vocalist for artists like George Jones and Ray Price. In 1966, Paycheck signed with Little Darlin' Records, a small label founded by producer Aubrey Mayhew.

Though billed as a concert album, At Carnegie Hall is a studio recording with no live audience. The album features pedal steel guitarist Lloyd Green, which is mixed nearly as loud as the vocals. The album's songs feature dark and twisted storytelling, drawing comparisons to the narrative style of the Coen brothers.

== Track listing ==
Side 1
No.	Title	Writer(s)	Length
1.	"King of the Road"	Roger Miller	2:05
2.	"Bayou Bum"	Arnie Adams; Aubrey Mayhew; Donny Young	2:36
3.	"Not What I Had in Mind"	Jack Clement	2:40
4.	"Pride Covered Ears"	Larry Kingston	2:42
5.	"He's in a Hurry"	Joe Poovey	2:21
6.	"Something He'll Have to Learn"	Adams; Mayhew; Young	2:40
7.	"My Last Night in Town"	Red Simpson	2:20

Side 2
No.	Title	Writer(s)	Length
1.	"Ballad of the Green Berets"	Robin Moore; Barry Sadler	3:30
2.	"Yes She's Gone"	Joan Moskatel	2:40
3.	"Wherever You Are"	Mayhew; Young	2:45
4.	"Handcuffed to Love"	Hope Harlow	2:20
5.	"Ballad of Frisco Bay"	Mayhew; Young	2:40
6.	"Big Town Baby"	Paul Angel	2:00
7.	"Understanding Makes Love"	Bob Leftridge	2:40
Total length:			29:17

Paycheck is a co-writer credited as Donny Young on "Bayou Bum," "Something He'll Have to Learn," "Wherever You Are," and "Ballad of Frisco Bay."

== Charts ==
Weekly chart performance for At Carnegie Hall
Chart (1966)	Peak position
US Top Country Albums (Billboard)	22
