= Jukebox Charlie =

Studio album by Johnny Paycheck
- Released: July 1967
- Recorded: August 1966, January and April 1967
- Studio: RCA Studio A (Nashville, Tennessee); RCA Studios New York (New York, New York)
- Genre: Country; honky-tonk
- Length: 31:34
- Label: Little Darlin' Records
- Producer: Aubrey Mayhew

Johnny Paycheck chronology
Gospeltime in My Fashion (1967)	Jukebox Charlie (1967)	Country Soul (1968)

Singles from Jukebox Charlie
- 1. "Motel Time Again" Released: November 5, 1966; 2. "Jukebox Charlie" Released: April 8, 1967

Professional ratings
Review scores
Source	Rating
AllMusic	4.5/5 stars

Jukebox Charlie (And Other Songs that Make the Jukebox Play) is the fourth studio album by American country music artist Johnny Paycheck. The album was released in July 1967 via Little Darlin' Records. It was produced by Aubrey Mayhew.

== Background ==
Mayhew, a key figure in Paycheck's early career, not only produced the album but also co-wrote several of its songs.

The album was released in July 1967 and became one of his most commercially successful early efforts, peaking at number 10 on the Billboard Top Country Albums chart. As with earlier releases for Little Darlin', the album's back cover credits only a handful of contributors, most notably Lloyd Green on the pedal steel guitar.

== Track listing ==
Side 1
No.	Title	Writer(s)	Length
1.	"Jukebox Charlie"	Aubrey Mayhew; Johnny Paycheck	2:25
2.	"Touch My Heart"	Mayhew; Paycheck	2:45
3.	"Just Between You and Me"	Jack Clement	2:20
4.	"Down at Kelly's"	Mayhew; Paycheck	2:33
5.	"You Can Hear a Teardrop"	Mack Vickery	2:15
6.	"Meanest Jukebox in Town"	Paycheck	2:25
7.	"My Baby Don't Love Me Anymore"	Mayhew; Paycheck	2:25

Side 2
No.	Title	Writer(s)	Length
1.	"Apartment No. 9"	Bobby Austin; Paycheck	2:13
2.	"Motel Time Again"	Bobby Bare	2:15
3.	"I Never Had the One I Wanted"	Claude Gray; Jimmy Lewis; Sheb Wooley	2:52
4.	"Big Brother"	Clement; Dickey Lee; Allen Reynolds	2:52
5.	"Or Is It Love"	Ray Buzzeo	2:45
6.	"Then Love Dies"	Mayhew; Paycheck	2:25
7.	"Malinche"	Paul Angel	2:15
Total length:			31:34

== Charts ==
Weekly chart performance for Jukebox Charlie
Chart (1967)	Peak position
US Top Country Albums (Billboard)	10

== Legacy ==
In 2019, Charley Crockett would pay tribute to the album by styling the cover art to his album The Valley around the cover art to Jukebox Charlie. Crockett would also later cover the album's title track on 2022's Lil' G.L. Presents: Jukebox Charley.
