= Mr. Lovemaker =

Studio album by Johnny Paycheck
- Released: June 1973
- Recorded: March 1973
- Studio: Columbia Recording Studio (Nashville, Tennessee)
- Genre: Country
- Length: 27:46
- Label: Epic Records
- Producer: Billy Sherrill

Johnny Paycheck chronology
Heartbreak, Tenn. (1972)	Mr. Lovemaker (1973)	Song and Dance Man (1973)

Singles from Mr. Lovemaker
- 1. "Something About You I Love" Released: February 24, 1973; 2. "Mr. Lovemaker" Released: June 9, 1973

Mr. Lovemaker is the twelfth studio album by American country music artist Johnny Paycheck. The album was released in June 1973, via Epic Records. It was produced by Billy Sherrill.

== Background ==
By the time Mr. Lovemaker was released, Paycheck's "second career" at Epic Records was in full swing, producing commercial hits and critical praise. This album followed in the stylistic footsteps of Someone To Give My Love To and Somebody Loves Me, but offered a stronger personal imprint.

Unlike earlier efforts where Paycheck had leaned heavily on outside writers, this album showcased his songwriting abilities alongside material from seasoned Nashville hitmakers like Jerry Foster and Bill Rice.

== Track listing ==
Side 1
No.	Title	Writer(s)	Length
1.	"Mr. Lovemaker"	Johnny Paycheck	2:10
2.	"Walk With Me, Girl"	Jerry Foster; Bill Rice	2:27
3.	"If Love Gets Any Better"	Paycheck	2:29
4.	"I'm Just Tired of Hurting You"	Foster; Rice	2:53
5.	"Love is a Strange and Wonderful Thing"	Paycheck	1:55

Side 2
No.	Title	Writer(s)	Length
1.	"Something About You I Love"	Foster; Rice	2:35
2.	"If You Just Win One Time"	Foster; Rice	2:03
3.	"I Won't Ever Love Again"	Foster; Rice	2:55
4.	"Once You've Had the Best"	Paycheck	2:42
5.	"All in the Name of Love"	Foster; Rice	2:46
6.	"She'll Unwine Me"	Larry Kingston	2:51
Total length:			27:46

== Charts ==
Weekly chart performance for Mr. Lovemaker
Chart (1972)	Peak position
US Top Country Albums (Billboard)	12
