= Old Violin =

Single by Johnny Paycheck

from the album Modern Times
- B-side: "Come to Me"
- Released: 1986
- Recorded: February 1986
- Genre: Country
- Length: 3:42
- Label: Mercury
- Songwriter: Johnny Paycheck
- Producer: Stan Cornelius

Johnny Paycheck singles chronology
"Sexy Southern Lady" (1986)	"Old Violin" (1986)	"Don't Bury Me 'til I'm Ready" (1986)

"Old Violin" is a song by American country music singer Johnny Paycheck. It is a single from his 1986 album Modern Times.

== Content ==
"Old Violin" was recorded in the mid-1980s during Paycheck's tenure with Mercury Records. The song was among his first recordings after Paycheck had been imprisoned for aggravated assault at a bar in Hillsboro, Ohio.

Kurt Wolff, in Country Music: The Rough Guide, describes "Old Violin" as a song in which Paycheck "faces old age with genuine trepidation". The lyric features the narrator comparing himself to an "old violin, soon to be put away and never played again".

== Other versions ==
In 2002, Daryle Singletary covered "Old Violin" for his covers album That's Why I Sing This Way. Singletary wanted to include Paycheck on his recording, and had a then-ill Paycheck deliver the song's closing recitation from his hospital bed. This recording was Paycheck's last before his death in early 2003. George Strait covered the song on his 2019 album Honky Tonk Time Machine.

== Charts ==
Weekly chart performance for "Old Violin"
Chart (1986)	Peak position
Canada RPM Country Tracks	36
US Hot Country Songs (Billboard)	21
