= Mr. Hag Told My Story =

Studio album by Johnny Paycheck
- Released: March 1981
- Studio: Brittania Recording Studio (Hollywood, California); Columbia Recording Studio (Nashville, Tennessee); Sound Emporium (Nashville, Tennessee)
- Genre: Country
- Length: 30:41
- Label: Epic Records
- Producer: Billy Sherrill

Johnny Paycheck chronology
New York Town (1980)	Mr. Hag Told My Story (1981)	Encore (1981)

Singles from Mr. Hag Told My Story
- 1. "I Can't Hold Myself in Line" Released: March 28, 1981; 2. "Yesterday's News (Just Hit Home Today)" Released: July 4, 1981

Mr. Hag Told My Story is the twenty-first studio album by American country music artist Johnny Paycheck. The album was released in March 1981, via Epic Records. It was produced by Billy Sherrill.

The album is a tribute to Merle Haggard, with Paycheck covering ten of Haggard's songs.

== Critical reception ==
Professional ratings
Review scores
Source	Rating
AllMusic	5/5 stars

AllMusic's Stephen Thomas Erlewine described it as a "sterling example of what a tribute album can be," and praised its emotional authenticity, saying it stands among "the great late-night honky tonk records in the country. The Richmond Times-Dispatch called the duets with Haggard "fine performances" and predicted strong appeal to fans of Paycheck's previous work with George Jones. Roberta Penn of The Rocket praised the record as a "living tribute" that elevated both performers, despite noting Paycheck's spoken intros as a minor flaw.

In Bob Claypool's review for the Houston Post, he noted that it was "altogether fitting" that the artist who had performed the tribute album form, Haggard himself, should be honored in such a thoughtful and respectful way.

The North Bay Nugget praised the "heart-breaking, tear jerking" qualities of Paycheck's delivery and concluding that the album "reflects Paycheck's whole purpose" as a deeply autobiographical musical statement.

== Track listing ==
All tracks written by Merle Haggard except where noted. On digital releases, every track is listed as being sung alongside Haggard, despite only three tracks featuring his vocals.

Side 1
No.	Title	Writer(s)	Length
1.	"Turnin' Off a Memory" (with Merle Haggard)		3:33
2.	"I've Got a Yearning"		3:04
3.	"Carolyn" (with Merle Haggard)	Tommy Collins	2:46
4.	"I'll Leave the Bottle on the Bar"		2:45
5.	"All Night Lady"		3:22

Side 2
No.	Title	Writer(s)	Length
1.	"I Can't Hold Myself in Line" (with Merle Haggard)		3:25
2.	"Yesterday's News Just Hit Home Today"		3:23
3.	"You Don't Have Very Far to Go"	Haggard; Red Simpson	2:45
4.	"No More You and Me"		2:26
5.	"Someone Told My Story"		3:12
Total length:			30:41

== Personnel ==
- Johnny Paycheck – vocals
- Merle Haggard – vocals, electric guitar
- Biff Adams – drums
- Jim Murphy – steel guitar
- Billy Sherrill – producer
- M. C. Rather – mastering
- Jim Williamson – engineer
- Ken Suesov – engineer
- Ron Reynolds – engineer
- Ronnie Dean – engineer
- Russ Bracher – engineer
- Steve Pouliot – engineer
- Slick Lawson – photography

The Strangers

- Ronnie Reno – acoustic guitar
- Dennis Hromek – electric bass
- Roy Nichols – electric guitar
- Gordon Terry – fiddle
- Don Markham – horn, saxophone, trumpet
- Mark Yeary – piano
- Norm Hamlet – steel guitar

== Charts ==
Weekly chart performance for Mr. Hag Told My Story
Chart (1981)	Peak position
US Top Country Albums (Billboard)	40
