= Everybody's Got a Family... Meet Mine =

Studio album by Johnny Paycheck
- Released: December 1979
- Studio: Columbia Recording Studio (Nashville, Tennessee)
- Genre: Country
- Length: 28:16
- Label: Epic Records
- Producer: Billy Sherrill

Johnny Paycheck chronology
Bars – Booze – Blondes (1979)	Everybody's Got a Family... Meet Mine (1979)	Double Trouble (1980)

Singles from Everybody's Got a Family... Meet Mine
- 1. "(Stay Away From) the Cocaine Train" Released: October 13, 1979; 2. "Drinkin' and Drivin'" Released: December 22, 1979; 3. "Fifteen Beers" Released: April 5, 1980

Everybody's Got a Family... Meet Mine is the twentieth studio album by American country music artist Johnny Paycheck. The album was released in December 1979, via Epic Records. It was produced by Billy Sherrill.

Professional ratings
Review scores
Source	Rating
AllMusic	2/5 stars
Houston Chronicle	5/5 stars

== Track listing ==
Side 1
No.	Title	Writer(s)	Length
1.	"(Stay Away From) The Cocaine Train"	Johnny Paycheck	3:08
2.	"Ragged Old Truck"	Billy Joe Shaver	3:02
3.	"Drinkin' and Drivin'"	Gary Gentry	3:03
4.	"Who Was That Man That Beat Me So"	Rick Pilgreen	2:35
5.	"Billy Bardo"	Ronny Scaife; Phil Thomas; P. Wilson	3:37

Side 2
No.	Title	Writer(s)	Length
1.	"Fifteen Beers"	B. Davis; Stephen Davis	2:40
2.	"Low Class Reunion"	S. Whipple	2:34
3.	"I Never Met a Girl I Didn't Like"	Jim Mundy	2:03
4.	"Save Your Heart for Me"	Bob McDill	3:04
5.	"Roll in My Sweet Baby's Arms"	Traditional	3:10
Total length:			28:16

== Personnel ==
- Johnny Paycheck – vocals
- The Nashville Edition – background vocals
- The West Texas Music Company – background vocals
- Henry Strzelecki – bass
- Michael McBride – bass
- Tommy Cogbill – bass
- Jerry Kroon – drums
- Jimmy Isbell – drums
- Johnny Barber – drums
- Tommy Jackson – fiddle
- Billy Sanford – guitar
- Cliff Parker – guitar
- Pete Wade – guitar
- Phil Baugh – guitar
- Reggie Young – guitar
- Tommy Allsup – guitar
- P. T. Gazell – harmonica
- Terry McMillan – harmonica
- Barry Walsh – piano
- James Drennen – piano
- Jim Murphy – steel guitar
- Jim Vest – steel guitar
- Weldon Myrick – steel guitar
- Billy Sherrill – producer
- Lou Bradley – engineer
- Slick Lawson – photography
- Bill Johnson – design

== Charts ==
Weekly chart performance for Everybody's Got a Family... Meet Mine
Chart (1979–1980)	Peak position
Canadian Albums (Billboard)	17
US Top Country Albums (Billboard)	42
