= Armed and Crazy =

Studio album by Johnny Paycheck
- Released: November 1978
- Recorded: January 1978, June 1978
- Studio: Columbia Recording Studio (Nashville, Tennessee)
- Genre: Country
- Length: 31:41
- Label: Epic Records
- Producer: Billy Sherrill

Johnny Paycheck chronology
Johnny Paycheck's Greatest Hits, Vol. 2 (1978)	Armed and Crazy (1978)	The Outlaw (1979)

Singles from Armed and Crazy
- 1. "Friend, Lover, Wife" Released: October 21, 1978; 2. "The Outlaw's Prayer" Released: January 27, 1979

Armed and Crazy is the eighteenth studio album by American country music artist Johnny Paycheck. The album was released in November 1978, via Epic Records. It was produced by Billy Sherrill.

Professional ratings
Review scores
Source	Rating
AllMusic	2.5/5 stars

Armed and Crazy received mixed critical responses. AllMusic's Stephen Thomas Erlewine described the album as a "glitzy, gaudy send-up" of Paycheck's outlaw persona. Eric Siegel of The Baltimore Sun praised "Friend, Lover, Wife" and "Just Makin' Love Don't Make it Love" as highlights that showed Paycheck's capacity for sensitivity and introspection.

== Track listing ==
Side 1
No.	Title	Writer(s)	Length
1.	"Friend, Lover, Wife"	Johnny Paycheck; Billy Sherrill	3:09
2.	"Armed and Crazy"	Dean Darst	2:48
3.	"Mainline"	R.C. Bannon; Paycheck	3:02
4.	"Thanks to the Cathouse (I'm in the Doghouse with You)"	M. Barnes; Frank Saulino; James Valentini	4:12
5.	"Leave It to Me"	Paycheck	3:11

Side 2
No.	Title	Writer(s)	Length
1.	"Me and the I.R.S."	Don Scaife; Gladys Scaife; Ronny Scaife; Phil Thomas	2:35
2.	"Let's Have a Hand for the Little Lady"	D. St. John; S. St. John; C. Tharp	1:59
3.	"Just Makin' Love Don't Make It Love"	Paycheck	2:57
4.	"Look What the Dog Drug In"	J. Chambers	2:45
5.	"The Outlaw's Prayer"	Sherrill; Glenn Sutton	5:03
Total length:			31:41

Expanded Edition
No.	Title	Writer(s)	Length
11.	"I Can't Hold Myself in Line" (with Merle Haggard)	Merle Haggard	3:43
12.	"Yesterday's News Just Hit Home Today"	Haggard	3:50
13.	"You Don't Have Very Far to Go" (with Merle Haggard)	Haggard; Red Simpson	2:58
14.	"No More You and Me" (with Merle Haggard)	Haggard	2:35
15.	"Someone Told My Story" (with Merle Haggard)	Haggard	3:11
Total length:			47:58

== Charts ==
Weekly chart performance for Armed and Dangerous
Chart (1978)	Peak position
Canadian Albums (Billboard)	12
US Top Country Albums (Billboard)	15
