= Lone Star Cafe =

Cafe and club in New York City

Coordinates: 40°44′6.4″N 73°59′38.3″W

The Lone Star Cafe was a cafe and club in New York City at 61 Fifth at the corner of Fifth Avenue and 13th Street, from 1976 to 1989. The Texas-themed cafe opened in February 1976 and became the premier country music venue in New York and booked big names and especially acts from Texas, like Greezy Wheels, George Strait, Asleep at the Wheel and Roy Orbison. Willie Nelson, Kinky Friedman, Roy Orbison, Delbert McClinton, Freddy Fender, Lonnie Mack, Doug Sahm, Jerry Jeff Walker, Ernest Tubb, and the Lost Gonzo Band were among Texas musicians who frequented the Lone Star Cafe. Joe Ely and Billy Joe Shaver also appeared at the cafe. The words from Shaver's 1973 song "Old Five and Dimers Like Me" were displayed on a banner in the front of the cafe: "Too Much Ain't Enough." Other national acts played the cafe, including The Blues Brothers, Clifton Chenier, the blues duo Buddy Guy & Junior Wells, Toots & the Maytalls, Wilson Pickett and James Brown, who recorded a live album there in 1985. Outlaw country pioneer Johnny Paycheck recorded his live album New York Town at the cafe in 1980. Bob Dylan joined a Levon Helm and Rick Danko concert at the cafe in 1983, and again in 1988.

In the 1970s, various Texas political, media and cultural figures in New York would visit the Lone Star Cafe, including Larry L. King, Ann Richards, Tommy Tune, Dan Rather, John Connally, Chet Flippo, Mark White and Linda Ellerbee.

The cafe sported a unique 40-foot sculpture of a giant iguana created by artist Bob "Daddy-O" Wade on top of the building. Neighboring businesses did not appreciate the sculpture and sought to have it removed. Although a court battle determined that it was art, eventually it was removed. In 1983 with the support of Mayor Ed Koch, the Iguana was restored to the roof at a ceremony with Koch and then-Texas governor Mark White. The cafe was co-founded by Mort Cooperman and Bill McGivney, two ad executives at Wells Rich Greene Advertising. Bill McGivney left shortly afterwards and was replaced by Bill Dick. Both Bill Dick and Mort Cooperman appeared in Kinky Friedman's book A Case of the Lone Star. Bill Dick was depicted as the owner and Mort Cooperman was the nefarious Detective Sergeant Mort Cooperman.

== Shows ==
1980

Chicken Legs, members of Little Feat minus Lowell George who passed in 1979, with member of Catfish Hodge Band

1981

- UNKNOWN, Ernest Tubb and his Texas Troubadours

1982

- May 24, The Richard and Linda Thompson Band

1984

- April 28, George Strait and the Ace in the Hole Band

1985

- April 30, Jaco Pastorius trio + Jam with Jimmy Page & Chris Slade
- July 7, Danny Toan & Central Park West and Jorma Kaukonen
- July 8, Burning Spear and One Life
- August 10, Robert Gordon with Stevie Ray Vaughan

1986

- March 21, The Fall
- May 5, Ed Kaecher and The Band with Rick Danko, Levon Helm, and Garth Hudson
- December 27, Willy de Ville

1987

- July 11, Jerry Lee Lewis

1988

- January 7, Hot Tuna with Peter Kaukonen and friends
