= Stan Cornelius =

American politician

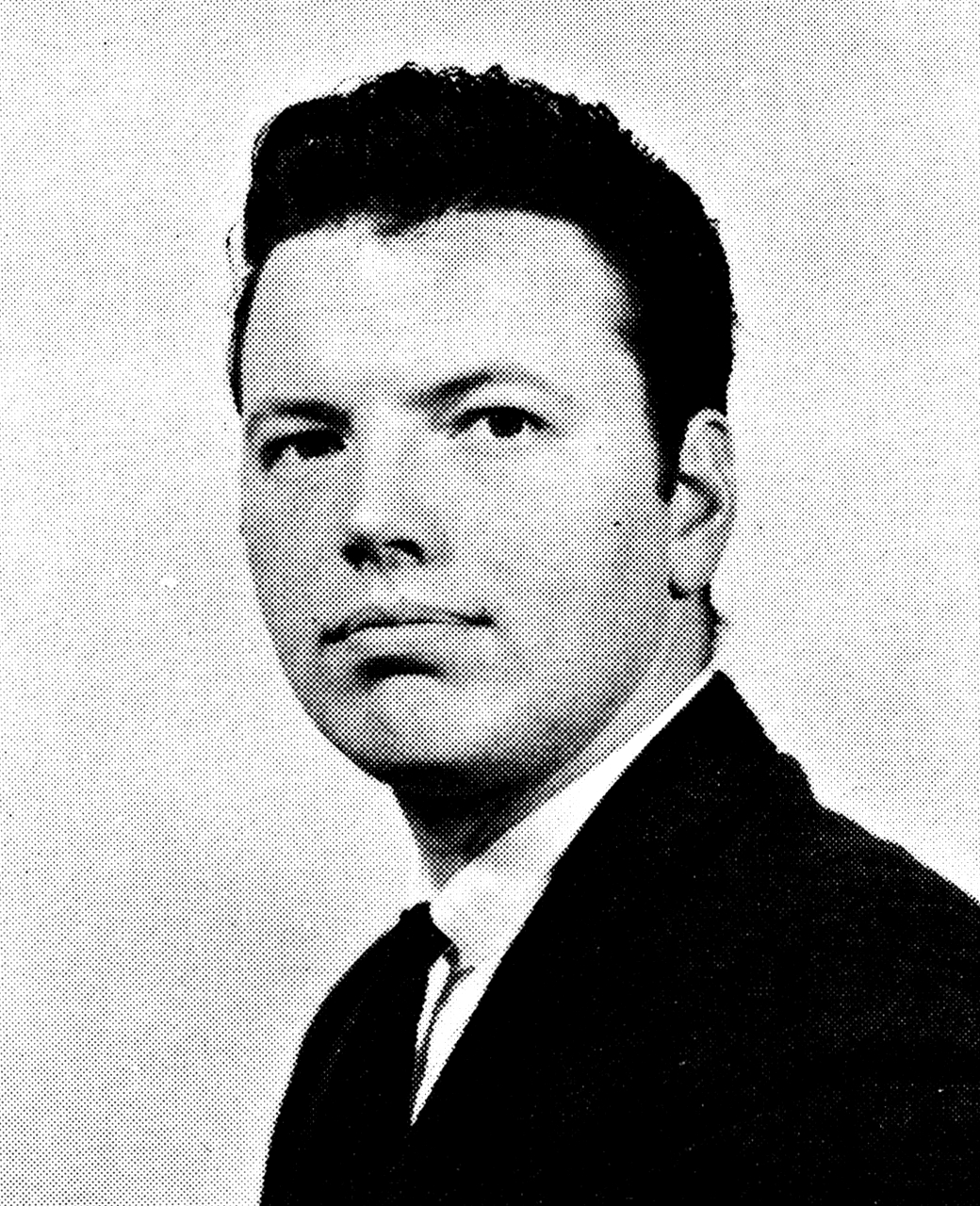

Member of the Alaska House of Representatives from the 8th district
- In office January 27, 1969 – January 10, 1971

Personal details
- Born: Stanley Preston Cornelius; October 15, 1941 Bremerton, Washington, U.S.
- Died: December 29, 2005 (aged 64) Nashville, Tennessee, U.S.
- Party: Republican
- Education: Alaska Methodist University (BA); University of New Mexico (JD)

Stanley Preston Cornelius (October 15, 1941 – December 29, 2005) was an American country musician, lawyer, politician and record producer.

== Early life and education ==
Cornelius was born on October 15, 1941, in Bremerton, Washington, one of three children (two sons and a daughter) born to Starling P. "Star" Cornelius (1916–1986) and wife Virginia (née Sloat). The family moved to the Territory of Alaska in 1954 during the height of the Cold War and lived in a variety of communities in Interior and Southcentral Alaska before settling several years later in Alaska's largest city, Anchorage. Cornelius attended Kodiak High School in Kodiak before transferring to Anchorage High School (now known as West Anchorage High School) during his senior year, where he graduated in 1958.

He briefly studied at Washington State University and the University of Oregon before attending Alaska Methodist University, where he graduated in 1964 with a Bachelor of Arts in political science, the same year he married Mary Ann Randall. He then attended the University of New Mexico School of Law, where he graduated with a Juris Doctor in 1967.

== Career ==
Cornelius was admitted to the Alaska bar on October 18, 1968, and commenced a private law practice based in Anchorage. The same year, he was elected as a Republican to the Alaska House of Representatives, garnering 14,065 votes in the at-large voting in the general election. He served in the 6th Alaska State Legislature from the 8th district, a multi-member district which encompassed the greater Anchorage area and comprised approximately a third of the 40-member body. Cornelius sponsored a resolution during the legislature's first session calling for Governor Keith Miller to designate October as "Country Music Month" in Alaska. He declined to run for another term in 1970, returning to his law practice. He remarried in 1972 and had a son born the following year.

Cornelius eventually moved to Nashville, Tennessee, where he lived the remainder of his life and was involved in the city's country music scene, both as a singer and as a record producer. He produced a number of songs, the best known of which was Johnny Paycheck's 1986 single "Old Violin".

== Personal life ==
Cornelius died of natural causes on December 29, 2005, at age 64. He had a wife, Mary.
