= Jukebox Charlie (song) =

Single by Johnny Paycheck

from the album Jukebox Charlie
- B-side: "Something In Your World"
- Released: April 8, 1967
- Genre: Country
- Length: 2:25
- Label: Little Darlin' Records
- Songwriters: Aubrey Mayhew; Johnny Paycheck
- Producer: Aubrey Mayhew

Johnny Paycheck singles chronology
"Motel Time Again" (1966)	"Jukebox Charlie" (1967)	"The Cave" (1967)

"Jukebox Charlie" is a song by American country music singer Johnny Paycheck. It was released on April 8, 1967, as a single from his fourth studio album Jukebox Charlie. The song was co-written by Paycheck and Aubrey Mayhew and produced by Mayhew.

The song received praise for the pedal steel guitar from Lloyd Green.

Charley Crockett covered the song on his 2022 album Lil G.L. Presents: Jukebox Charley as "Jukebox Charley".

== Charts ==
Chart performance for "Jukebox Charlie"
Chart (1967)	Peak position
US Hot Country Songs (Billboard)	15
