= The Lovin' Machine (song) =

Single by Johnny Paycheck

from the album The Lovin' Machine
- B-side: "Pride Covered Ears"
- Released: June 4, 1966
- Recorded: February 1966
- Genre: Country
- Length: 2:30
- Label: Little Darlin' Records
- Songwriter: Larry Kingston
- Producer: Aubrey Mayhew

Johnny Paycheck singles chronology
"I'm Barely Hangin' on to Me" (1966)	"The Lovin' Machine" (1966)	"Ballad of the Green Berets" (1966)

"The Lovin' Machine" is a song by American country music singer Johnny Paycheck. It was released on June 4, 1966, as the lead, title, and lone single from his second studio album The Lovin' Machine. The song was written by Larry Kingston and produced by Aubrey Mayhew. The song was Paycheck's first top-ten hit.

== History ==
The song was Paycheck's first under Little Darlin' Records, a label he co-founded alongside producer Aubrey Mayhew.

The song features Lloyd Green on the pedal steel guitar.

== Commercial performance ==
"The Lovin' Machine" was Paycheck's first top-ten single and marked the beginning of a period deemed as his "most remarkable."

== Charts ==
Chart performance for "The Lovin' Machine"
Chart (1966)	Peak position
US Hot Country Songs (Billboard)	8
