= Loving You Beats All I've Ever Seen =

Studio album by Johnny Paycheck
- Released: March 1975
- Recorded: November 1974
- Studio: Columbia Recording Studio (Nashville, Tennessee)
- Genre: Country
- Length: 25:28
- Label: Epic Records
- Producer: Billy Sherrill

Johnny Paycheck chronology
Johnny Paycheck's Greatest Hits (1974)	Loving You Beats All I've Ever Seen (1975)	At His Best (1975)

Singles from Loving You Beats All I've Ever Seen
- 1. "Loving You Beats All I've Ever Seen" Released: March 1, 1975; 2. "I Don't Love Her Anymore" Released: May 31, 1975

Loving You Beats All I've Ever Seen is the fourteenth studio album by American country music artist Johnny Paycheck. The album was released in March 1975, via Epic Records. It was produced by Billy Sherrill.

Al Freeders of the Dayton Daily News praised the album, specifically Paycheck's writing on the album's title track.

== Track listing ==
Side 1
No.	Title	Writer(s)	Length
1.	"Loving You Beats All I've Ever Seen"	Johnny Paycheck	2:06
2.	"Don't Take My Sunshine Away"	Jerry Foster; Bill Rice	2:17
3.	"If You Were a Place (You Would be Heaven)"	B. Jones; R. Porter	2:22
4.	"Ain't She Something Else"	Foster; Rice	2:39
5.	"Rhythm Guitar"	Tom Hill	2:25

Side 2
No.	Title	Writer(s)	Length
1.	"I Don't Love Her Anymore"	Red Lane; M. Morrison	2:44
2.	"My Lovin' Time With You"	Jimmy Peppers	2:38
3.	"The Most Beautiful Girl"	Rory Bourke; Billy Sherrill; Norro Wilson	2:48
4.	"Loving You is All I Thought it Would Be"	Paycheck	2:56
5.	"The Touch of the Master's Hand"	Sherrill; M. B. Welch	2:33
Total length:			25:28
