= 11 Months and 29 Days =

Studio album by Johnny Paycheck
- Released: October 1976
- Recorded: November 1975–May 1976
- Studio: Columbia Recording Studio (Nashville, Tennessee)
- Genre: Country
- Length: 27:46
- Label: Epic Records
- Producer: Billy Sherrill

Johnny Paycheck chronology
At His Best (1975)	11 Months and 29 Days (1976)	Slide Off of Your Satin Sheets (1977)

Singles from 11 Months and 29 Days
- 1. "The Feminine Touch" Released: February 21, 1976; 2. "Gone at Last" Released: May 8, 1976; 3. "11 Months and 29 Days" Released: July 24, 1976; 4. "I Can See Me Lovin' You Again" Released: October 23, 1976

11 Months and 29 Days is the fifteenth studio album by American country music artist Johnny Paycheck. The album was released in October 1976, via Epic Records. It was produced by Billy Sherrill.

Paycheck was credited as John Austin Paycheck, making it the only album of his career to credit him as such.

Professional ratings
Review scores
Source	Rating
AllMusic	4.5/5 stars

== Track listing ==
Side 1
No.	Title	Writer(s)	Length
1.	"11 Months and 29 Days"	Billy Sherrill	3:45
2.	"The Woman Who Put Me Here"	Johnny Paycheck	2:01
3.	"The Feminine Touch"	Frank Dycus; Larry Kingston	2:36
4.	"I Sleep With Her Memory Every Night"	Paycheck	2:19
5.	"I Can See Me Lovin' You Again"	Jerry Foster; Bill Rice	2:20

Side 2
No.	Title	Writer(s)	Length
1.	"Gone at Last" (featuring Charnissa)	Paul Simon	3:05
2.	"Closer Than I've Ever Been"	Archie Jordan; Finley Duncan	2:33
3.	"I've Seen Better Days"	Danny Morrison; Red Lane	3:39
4.	"Live with Me ('Til I Can Learn to Live Again)"	Sherrill	2:28
5.	"That's What the Outlaws in Texas Want to Hear"	Gary Adams; Paycheck; Mike Cutright	3:00
Total length:			27:46

== Charts ==
Weekly chart performance for 11 Months and 29 Days
Chart (1976)	Peak position
US Top Country Albums (Billboard)	40
