= Song and Dance Man (album) =

Studio album by Johnny Paycheck
- Released: December 1973
- Recorded: July 1973
- Studio: Columbia Recording Studio (Nashville, Tennessee)
- Genre: Country
- Length: 29:12
- Label: Epic Records
- Producer: Billy Sherrill

Johnny Paycheck chronology
Mr. Lovemaker (1973)	Song and Dance Man (1973)	Johnny Paycheck's Greatest Hits (1974)

Singles from Song and Dance Man
- 1. "Song and Dance Man" Released: November 3, 1973; 2. "My Part of Forever" Released: March 16, 1974; 3. "For a Minute There" Released: November 2, 1974

Song and Dance Man (stylized as Song & Dance Man) is the thirteenth studio album by American country music artist Johnny Paycheck. The album was released in December 1973, via Epic Records. It was produced by Billy Sherrill.

== Track listing ==
Side 1
No.	Title	Writer(s)	Length
1.	"Song and Dance Man"	Jerry Foster; Bill Rice	2:33
2.	"May Part of Forever"	Foster; Rice	2:58
3.	"Love (Don't Let Me Down)"	Foster; Rice	2:43
4.	"For a Minute There"	Foster; Rice	2:35
5.	"Your Love is Mine"	Foster; Rice	2:41

Side 2
No.	Title	Writer(s)	Length
1.	"Loving Arms"	Tom Jans	2:55
2.	"I Love Loving You, Baby"	Jim Seals; Troy Seals	1:59
3.	"Once She Loved Me That Much"	Foster; Rice	2:23
4.	"Because I Love You"	Foster; Rice	2:35
5.	"The Old Blind Fiddler"	Billy Sherrill; Shirley Tackitt; Carmol Taylor	3:20
6.	"She's There When I Come Home"	Foster; Rice	2:30
Total length:			29:12

== Charts ==
Weekly chart performance for Song and Dance Man
Chart (1972)	Peak position
US Top Country Albums (Billboard)	16
