= Double Trouble (George Jones and Johnny Paycheck album) =

Studio album by George Jones and Johnny Paycheck
- Released: 1980
- Recorded: March 1979–March 1980
- Studios: Columbia Recording Studio (Nashville, Tennessee)
- Genres: Country, rock and roll
- Length: 28:10
- Label: Epic
- Producer: Billy Sherrill

George Jones chronology
My Very Special Guests (1979)	Double Trouble (1980)	I Am What I Am (1980)

Johnny Paycheck chronology
Everybody's Got a Family... Meet Mine (1979)	Double Trouble (1980)	New York Town (1980)

Singles from Double Trouble
- 1. "Maybellene" Released: November 11, 1978; 2. "You Can Have Her" Released: June 29, 1979; 3. "When You're Ugly Like Us (You Just Naturally Got to Be Cool)" Released: June 12, 1980; 4. "You Better Move On" Released: October 10, 1980

Double Trouble is an album by American country music artists George Jones and Johnny Paycheck. It was released in 1980 on the Epic Records label. The album consists of covers of rock and roll hits from the 1950s and 1960s, with the exception of the opening track, "When You're Ugly Like Us (You Just Naturally Got to Be Cool)", an original song. Double Trouble is Jones and Paycheck's only duet album.

== Background ==
Paycheck had played bass for Jones as part of the Jones Boys in the 1960s. The production, by Billy Sherrill, has Sherrill's trademark "countrypolitan" sound and includes a female chorus on some songs.

== Reception ==
Professional ratings
Review scores
Source	Rating
AllMusic	1/5 stars
MusicHound Folk: The Essential Album Guide	1.5/5 stars

Although the album stalled on the Billboard charts at number 45, the Chuck Berry song "Maybellene" peaked at number 7 on the country singles chart. "You Can Have Her" and "You Better Move On" were also minor hits.

Stephen Thomas Erlewine of AllMusic observes, "The pair sound as if they were on one of their notorious drinking and drugging binges, making jokes with each other throughout every song (except the closing "You Better Move On") and singing without regard for key." He also calls it "easily the worst album George Jones ever recorded."

== Track listing ==
Side one
No.	Title	Writer(s)	Length
1.	"When You're Ugly Like Us (You Just Naturally Got to Be Cool)"	Don Goodman, Rick Schulman	2:25
2.	"Along Came Jones"	Jerry Leiber, Mike Stoller	2:56
3.	"Proud Mary"	John Fogerty	2:47
4.	"You Can Have Her"	William S. Cook	3:11
5.	"Smack Dab in the Middle"	Charles Calhoun	2:39

Side two
No.	Title	Writer(s)	Length
1.	"Maybellene"	Chuck Berry, Alan Freed, Russ Fratto	2:20
2.	"Roll Over Beethoven"	Berry	3:47
3.	"Kansas City (w/ Johnny Rodriguez on guest vocals)"	Leiber, Stoller	3:04
4.	"Tutti Frutti"	Richard Penniman, Dorothy LaBostrie, Robert Blackwell	2:10
5.	"You Better Move On"	Arthur Alexander	2:46

== Personnel ==
Musicians

- George Jones – vocals
- Johnny Paycheck – vocals
- Johnny Rodriguez – vocals (8)
- The Nashville Edition – background vocals (2–4, 7–9)
- Diane Tidwell – background vocals (1, 5, 10)
- Janie Fricke – background vocals (1, 5, 10)
- Joe Bias – background vocals (1, 5, 10)
- Judy Anderson – background vocals (1, 5, 10)
- Nick DeStefano – background vocals (1, 5, 10)

Technical

- Billy Sherrill – producer
- Lou Bradley – engineer
- Ron Reynolds – engineer
- Slick Lawson – photography

== Singles ==
Year	Single	Peak positions	
Year	Single	US Country	CAN Country
1978	"Maybellene"	7	4
1979	"You Can Have Her"	14	26
1980	"When You're Ugly Like Us (You Just Naturally Got to Be Cool)"	31	29
1980	"You Better Move On"	18	25
