= Once You've Had the Best =

1973 song performed by George Jones

Song by Johnny Paycheck

from the album Mr. Lovemaker
- Released: June 1973
- Studio: Columbia Recording Studio (Nashville, Tennessee)
- Genre: Country
- Length: 2:42
- Label: Epic
- Songwriter: Johnny Paycheck
- Producer: Billy Sherrill

"Once You've Had the Best" is a country ballad written by Johnny Paycheck. It was recorded by Paycheck on his 1973 album Mr. Lovemaker. The song was popularized in a more optimistic tone by George Jones, who released it as a single for his album The Grand Tour, with the single reaching number three on the Billboard Hot Country Songs chart.

== Original recording ==
Paycheck wrote and recorded the song for his 1973 album, Mr. Lovemaker. The song received praise from critics, specifically for Paycheck's songwriting, especially in an album mainly written by outside writers.

== George Jones version ==
"Once You've Had the Best"

Single by George Jones

from the album The Grand Tour
- B-side: "Mary Don't Go 'Round"
- Released: October 24, 1973
- Recorded: 1973
- Genre: Country
- Length: 2:36
- Label: Epic
- Songwriter: Johnny Paycheck
- Producer: Billy Sherrill

George Jones singles chronology
"Nothing Ever Hurt Me (Half as Bad as Losing You)" (1973)	"Once You've Had the Best" (1973)	"The Grand Tour" (1974)

George Jones recorded the song for his 1974 album, The Grand Tour. It was released as a single through Epic Records on October 24, 1973. The single debuted on the Billboard Hot Country Songs chart on November 24, 1973, and then peaked at number three.

Jones' version featured a more optimistic tone and was generally considered as the far superior version over Paycheck's.

=== Charts ===
Chart performance for "Once You've Had the Best"
Chart (1973–1974)	Peak position
Canada Country (Billboard)	65
US Hot Country Songs (Billboard)	3

== Other versions ==
- Alan Jackson on his 1999 album Under the Influence
- Sammy Kershaw on his 2014 album Do You Know Me: A Tribute to George Jones
