= She's All I Got (album) =

Studio album by Johnny Paycheck
- Released: December 1971
- Recorded: August 1971
- Studio: Columbia Recording Studio (Nashville, Tennessee)
- Genre: Country
- Length: 30:16
- Label: Epic Records
- Producer: Billy Sherrill

Johnny Paycheck chronology
Again (1970)	She's All I Got (1971)	Someone to Give My Love To (1972)

Singles from She's All I Got
- 1. "She's All I Got" Released: October 9, 1971

She's All I Got is the eighth studio album by American country music artist Johnny Paycheck. The album was released in December 1971 via Epic Records. It is Paycheck's first album for Epic and the first to be produced by Billy Sherrill.

== Critical reception and commercial performance ==
Professional ratings
Review scores
Source	Rating
Allmusic	5/5 stars

Reviewers noted that Paycheck, though often compared vocally to George Jones and Freddie Hart, brought a unique intensity and emotional intelligence to his performances. The album was praised for songs like "You Touched My Life" and "My Elusive Dreams", where Paycheck's interpretation elevated the material. While some critics dismissed Paycheck's Epic era as less edgy than his earlier work, the commercial success of this album proved that he could evolve artistically without losing the core of his honky-tonk identity.

She's All I Got reached number five on the Billboard Top Country Albums chart.

== Track listing ==
Side 1
No.	Title	Writer(s)	Length
1.	"She's All I Got"	Gary U.S. Bonds; Jerry Williams Jr.	2:53
2.	"You Touched My Life"	Jerry Foster; Bill Rice	2:57
3.	"Love Sure Is Beautiful"	Johnny Paycheck	2:35
4.	"She's Everything to Me"	Foster; Rice	2:25
5.	"My Elusive Dreams"	Curly Putnam; Billy Sherrill	3:18

Side 2
No.	Title	Writer(s)	Length
1.	"He Will Break Your Heart"	Jerry Butler; Calvin Carter; Curtis Mayfield	3:21
2.	"You Once Lived Here"	Autry Inman	2:44
3.	"Only Love Can Save Us Now"	Buddy Killen; Sherrill	2:12
4.	"Let's Walk Hand in Hand"	Paycheck	3:09
5.	"Livin' in a House Full of Love"	Sherrill; Glenn Sutton	2:00
6.	"A Man That's Satisfied"	Paycheck	2:42
Total length:			30:16

== Charts ==
Weekly chart performance for She's All I Got
Chart (1971)	Peak position
US Top Country Albums (Billboard)	5
