= Take This Job and Shove It (album) =

Studio album by Johnny Paycheck
- Released: November 1977
- Recorded: 1977
- Studio: CBS Recording Studios (Nashville, Tennessee)
- Genre: Country
- Length: 27:57
- Label: Epic
- Producer: Billy Sherrill

Johnny Paycheck chronology
Slide Off of Your Satin Sheets (1977)	Take This Job and Shove It (1977)	Johnny Paycheck's Greatest Hits, Vol. 2 (1978)

Singles from Take This Job and Shove It
- 1. "Take This Job and Shove It" Released: November 5, 1977; 2. "Colorado Kool-Aid" Released: January 28, 1978; 3. "Georgia in a Jug" Released: April 15, 1978

Professional ratings
Review scores
Source	Rating
Allmusic	4/5 stars
Christgau's Record Guide	B−

Take This Job and Shove It is the seventeenth album released by country music artist Johnny Paycheck. It was his second album released in 1977 (see 1977 in country music) and is his most commercially successful album, being certified platinum by the RIAA. It contains his most well known song, the David Allan Coe-written title song. It was his only single ever to reach #1 on the Country charts. Two other singles released from this album, "Colorado Kool-Aid" and "Georgia in a Jug", reached #50 and #17, respectively.

== Content ==
Two of the album's songs are covers: "The Man From Bowling Green" was first recorded by Tammy Wynette for her 1975 album I Still Believe in Fairy Tales, and then recorded by Jody Miller and Bob Luman in 1976. "Colorado Kool-Aid" was originally recorded by Red Sovine.

"Take This Job and Shove It" would later be recorded by its writer David Allan Coe on his 1978 album Family Album, as well as a multitude of others artists. Gene Watson recorded "From Cotton to Satin" in 2008. "The Spirits of St. Louis" would be recorded in 1979 by Stonewall Jackson on his album Bad Ass. (Around that same time he released the single "Listening to Johnny Paycheck".) 1979 also saw Moe Bandy recording "Barstool Mountain" for his album It's a Cheating Situation as well as Charlie Rich recording "The Fool Strikes Again" for an album of the same name. "Georgia in a Jug" was recorded by Blake Shelton in 2003 for his album The Dreamer.

== Track listing ==
=== Side One ===
1. "Take This Job and Shove It" (David Allan Coe) - 2:35
2. "From Cotton to Satin (From Birmingham to Manhattan)" (James Vest, David Chamberlain) - 3:05
3. "The Spirits of St. Louis" (Roger Bowling, Robert John Jones) - 3:03
4. "The 4-F Blues" (Jerry Foster, Bill Rice) - 2:37
5. "Barstool Mountain" (Donn Tankersley, Wayne Carson) - 2:50

=== Side Two ===
1. "Georgia in a Jug" (Bobby Braddock) - 2:41
2. "The Fool Strikes Again" (Stephen Allen Davis, Mark Sherrill, Gary Cobb) - 2:28
3. "The Man From Bowling Green" (Troy Seals, Max D. Barnes) - 2:49
4. "When I Had a Home to Go To" (Billy Sherrill, Glenn Sutton) - 2:14
5. "Colorado Kool-Aid" (Phil Thomas) - 3:35

== Production ==
- All tracks produced by Billy Sherrill
- Recorded and engineered at CBS Recording Studios by Lou Bradley

== Personnel ==
- The Nashville Edition - background vocals
- Pete Drake - steel guitar (uncredited)

Technical

- Bill Barnes - album design
- Slick Lawson - photography
