= Slide Off of Your Satin Sheets =

Studio album by Johnny Paycheck
- Released: May 1977
- Recorded: November 1976, February 1977
- Studio: Columbia Recording Studio (Nashville, Tennessee)
- Genre: Country
- Length: 27:43
- Label: Epic Records
- Producer: Billy Sherrill

Johnny Paycheck chronology
11 Months and 29 Days (1976)	Slide Off of Your Satin Sheets (1977)	Take This Job and Shove It (1977)

Singles from Slide Off of Your Satin Sheets
- 1. "Slide Off of Your Satin Sheets" Released: February 12, 1977; 2. "I'm the Only Hell (Mama Ever Raised)" Released: June 11, 1977

Slide Off of Your Satin Sheets is the sixteenth studio album by American country music artist Johnny Paycheck. The album was released in May 1977 via Epic Records. It was produced by Billy Sherrill.

== Critical reception and commercial performance ==
Professional ratings
Review scores
Source	Rating
AllMusic	4.5/5 stars

The album peaked at number 22 on the Billboard Top Country Albums chart. The two singles, "Slide Off of the Satin Sheets" and "I'm the Only Hell (Mama Ever Raised)," both landed in the top ten on the Billboard Hot Country Songs chart, peaking at number 7 and number 8, respectively.

== Track listing ==
Side 1
No.	Title	Writer(s)	Length
1.	"Slide Off of Your Satin Sheets"	Wayne Carson; Donn Tankersley	2:57
2.	"If You Could Hold My Heart (For Awhile)"	Johnny Paycheck; Billy Sherrill	2:36
3.	"I've Got Them Lookin' in the Mirror, Wonderin' Where My Woman Went Blues"	Paycheck	2:08
4.	"Hank (You Tried to Tell Me)"	David Chamberlain; Jim Vest	2:14
5.	"I'm the Only Hell (Mama Ever Raised)"	Bobby Borchers; Wayne Kemp	3:10

Side 2
No.	Title	Writer(s)	Length
1.	"You're Still on My Mind"	Luke McDaniel	2:05
2.	"I Did the Right Thing"	Bobby Braddock	4:04
3.	"Woman (You Better Love Me)"	Paycheck	2:55
4.	"You're Gonne Be the Cowboy"	Braddock; Sonny Throckmorton	2:39
5.	"(To Be So Bad) She's Still Lookin' Good"	Paycheck	2:55
Total length:			27:43

== Charts ==
Weekly chart performance for Slide Off of Your Satin Sheets
Chart (1977)	Peak position
US Top Country Albums (Billboard)	22
