= A-11 (song) =

Single by Johnny Paycheck
- B-side: "Where (in the World)"
- Released: September 1965
- Recorded: August 1965
- Studio: RCA Victor Studio (New York, New York)
- Genre: Country
- Length: 2:17
- Label: Hilltop Records
- Songwriter: Hank Cochran
- Producer: Aubrey Mayhew

Johnny Paycheck singles chronology
"For Those Who Think Young" (1965)	"A-11" (1965)	"Heartbreak Tennessee" (1965)

"A-11" is a song by American country music singer Johnny Paycheck. It was released in September 1965 as a single. The song was written by Hank Cochran and produced by Aubrey Mayhew. The song was Paycheck's breakthrough single.

== History ==
A-11 was written by Hank Cochran while on a night out at Tootsie's Orchid Lounge in Nashville, Tennessee. It was first recorded and released by Don Deal in 1963. It was also recorded by Buck Owens in 1964, where Johnny Paycheck heard the song on the radio before recording his own version.

Leading up to the songs release, Paycheck had little-to-no success as a singer, but was gaining notoriety as a backup singer and band member for popular artists including George Jones, Ray Price, and Porter Wagoner.

The song was later covered by Cochran himself, Norma Jean, Daryle Singletary, and as a duet by Jamey Johnson and Ronnie Dunn.

== Commercial performance ==
Paycheck's version was the first to gain popularity, debuting in October 1965, before peaking at number 26 on the Billboard Hot Country Songs chart.

The song also received a nomination for a Grammy Award.

== Charts ==
Chart performance for "A-11"
Chart (1965–1966)	Peak position
US Hot Country Songs (Billboard)	26
