= Someone to Give My Love To =

Studio album by Johnny Paycheck
- Released: May 1972
- Recorded: August 1971, January 1972
- Studio: Columbia Recording Studio (Nashville, Tennessee)
- Genre: Country
- Length: 29:17
- Label: Epic Records
- Producer: Billy Sherrill

Johnny Paycheck chronology
She's All I Got (1971)	Someone to Give My Love To (1972)	Somebody Loves Me (1972)

Singles from Someone to Give My Love To
- 1. "Someone to Give My Love To" Released: March 11, 1972; 2. "Love Is a Good Thing" Released: June 24, 1972

Someone to Give My Love To is the ninth studio album by American country music artist Johnny Paycheck. The album was released in May 1972 via Epic Records. It was produced by Billy Sherrill.

The title track reached number one on Record World, number two on Cashbox, and number four on Billboard's Hot Country Songs chart.

== Critical reception and commercial performance ==
Professional ratings
Review scores
Source	Rating
AllMusic	4/5 stars

Someone to Give My Love To reached number nine on the Billboard Top Country Albums chart. The title track became a major hit and was seen as evidence that Paycheck's return to form was not a fluke.

== Track listing ==
Side 1
No.	Title	Writer(s)	Length
1.	"Someone to Give My Love To"	Jerry Foster; Bill Rice	3:00
2.	"Smile, Somebody Loves You"	Bobby Austin	2:39
3.	"Something"	George Harrison	2:18
4.	"Your Love Is the Key"	Johnny Paycheck	2:53
5.	"Mr. Bojangles"	Jerry Jeff Walker	3:19

Side 2
No.	Title	Writer(s)	Length
1.	"Love Is a Good Thing"	Foster; Rice	2:42
2.	"A Heart Don't Need Eyes"	Paycheck	2:40
3.	"She's All I Live For"	Paycheck	2:24
4.	"The Rain Never Falls in Denver"	Foster; Rice	2:30
5.	"High on the Thought of You"	Earl Montgomery	2:13
6.	"It's Only a Matter of Wine"	Frank Dycus; Larry Kingston	2:39
Total length:			29:17

== Charts ==
Weekly chart performance for Someone to Give My Love To
Chart (1972)	Peak position
US Top Country Albums (Billboard)	9
