= Take This Job and Shove It =

Country music song written by David Allan Coe

Single by Johnny Paycheck

from the album Take This Job and Shove It
- B-side: "Colorado Kool-Aid"
- Released: October 1977
- Recorded: August 24, 1977
- Studio: CBS Recording Studios (Nashville, Tennessee)
- Genre: Country
- Length: 2:35
- Label: Epic 50469
- Songwriter: David Allan Coe
- Producer: Billy Sherrill

Johnny Paycheck singles chronology
"I'm the Only Hell (Mama Ever Raised)" (1977)	"Take This Job and Shove It" (1977)	"Georgia in a Jug" (1978)

"Take This Job and Shove It" is a 1977 country music song written by David Allan Coe and popularized by Johnny Paycheck, about the bitterness of a man who has worked long and hard with no apparent reward. The song was first recorded by Paycheck on his album also titled Take This Job and Shove It. The recording hit number one on the country charts for two weeks, spending 18 weeks on the charts. It was Paycheck's only number one hit.

Its b-side, "Colorado Kool-Aid," spent ten weeks on the same chart and peaked at number 50.

Coe's recording was released in 1978 on his album Family Album. Coe also recorded a variation of the song called "Take This Job and Shove It Too" on his 1980 album I've Got Something to Say. It included the line "Paycheck, you may be a thing of the past." Coe was annoyed that people assumed that Paycheck had written the song, even though the single released by Paycheck, and subsequent album, both credit Coe as the song's composer.

The song inspired a 1981 film of the same name.

A cover version also appears on 1986's Bedtime for Democracy by Dead Kennedys. Another cover version, "Shove This Jay-Oh-Bee", performed by Canibus with Biz Markie, appears in the 1999 film Office Space. Chuck Barris and the Hollywood Cowboys performed a modified version of the piece as Barris's swan song when The Gong Show was kicked off NBC in 1978.

== Influence ==
"Take this job and shove it" became a popular phrase as a result of the song. It also became a snowclone phrase, leading to a variety of book and article titles of the form, "Take this job and ... it". The most notable is "Take this job and love it", which has been the title of dozens of books, mostly about career counseling, as well as the title of a 2007 episode of the television series Hannah Montana. Another notable variation was the 2006 book Take This Job and Ship It by U.S. Senator Byron Dorgan. Another variation is the quote "take this job and fill it" from The Simpsons episode, "Lisa vs. Malibu Stacy". (Another related snowclone is "take this ... and shove it," for any unpleasant or low-quality item.)

== Chart performance ==
Chart (1977–78)	Peak position
US Hot Country Songs (Billboard)	1
Canadian RPM Country Tracks	1
