= Somebody Loves Me (Johnny Paycheck album) =

Studio album by Johnny Paycheck
- Released: October 1972
- Recorded: July 1972
- Studio: Columbia Recording Studio (Nashville, Tennessee)
- Genre: Country
- Length: 28:10
- Label: Epic Records
- Producer: Billy Sherrill

Johnny Paycheck chronology
Someone to Give My Love To (1972)	Somebody Loves Me (1972)	Heartbreak, Tenn. (1972)

Singles from Somebody Loves Me
- 1. "Somebody Loves Me" Released: October 7, 1972

Somebody Loves Me is the tenth studio album by American country music artist Johnny Paycheck. The album was released in October 1972 via Epic Records. It was produced by Billy Sherrill.

Doug Davis of Orlando Evening Star described the album as featuring "some weird backup sounds" but ultimately praised it as one of the brightest moments in Paycheck's career.

== Track listing ==
Side 1
No.	Title	Writer(s)	Length
1.	"Somebody Loves Me"	Jerry Foster; Bill Rice	2:48
2.	"Spread It Around"	Foster; Rice	2:32
3.	"I Take It on Home"	Kenny O'Dell	3:14
4.	"Loving an Angel Every Day"	Johnny Paycheck	2:39
5.	"Song Sung Blue"	Neil Diamond	3:00

Side 2
No.	Title	Writer(s)	Length
1.	"Life Can Be Beautiful"	Foster; Rice	2:17
2.	"The Woman Loves Me Right"	Earl Montgomery	2:25
3.	"Love Couldn't Be Any Better"	Foster; Rice	2:05
4.	"It Takes a Woman's Love"	Foster; Rice	2:28
5.	"Without You (There's No Such Thing as Love)"	Paycheck	2:22
6.	"Kissing Yesterday Goodbye"	Paycheck	2:20
Total length:			28:10

== Charts ==
Weekly chart performance for Somebody Loves Me
Chart (1972)	Peak position
US Top Country Albums (Billboard)	16
