= Johnny Paycheck =

American country singer (1938–2003)

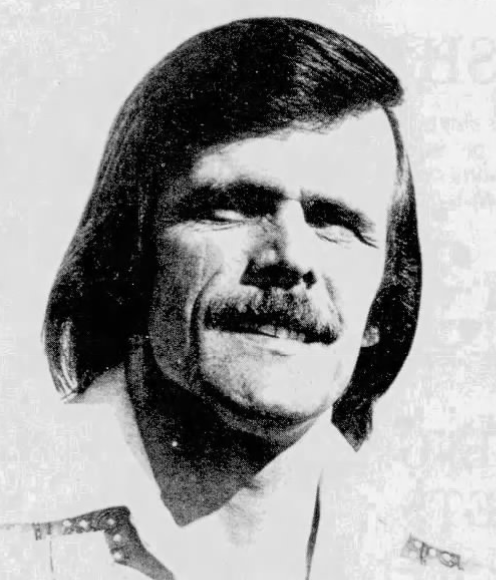
- Paycheck in 1975

Background information
- Also known as: Donny Young
- Born: Donald Eugene Lytle; May 31, 1938; Greenfield, Ohio, U.S.
- Died: February 19, 2003 (aged 64) Nashville, Tennessee, U.S.
- Genres: Country; outlaw country; honky-tonk
- Occupations: Singer; songwriter
- Works: Discography
- Years active: 1953–2003
- Labels: Little Darlin'; Certron; Epic; Sony

Johnny Paycheck (born Donald Eugene Lytle; May 31, 1938 – February 19, 2003) was an American country music singer and songwriter. He is a notable figure in the outlaw movement in country music.

Rising from humble beginnings in Greenfield, Ohio, Paycheck began performing in his teens and gained early recognition as a session musician and harmony vocalist for stars such as Ray Price, George Jones, and Faron Young. Adopting the stage name Johnny Paycheck in the mid-1960s, he scored several hits throughout the next decades, most notably "She's All I Got" in 1971.

Paycheck reached the peak of his fame with the 1977 blue-collar anthem "Take This Job and Shove It," written by David Allan Coe, which became a cultural phenomenon and helped solidify Paycheck's status as a defining figure of outlaw country alongside Waylon Jennings, Willie Nelson, and Merle Haggard. His career, however, was marked as much by turmoil as triumph, as he struggled with substance abuse, alcohol, spent time in prison, and was involved in multiple legal controversies, including a conviction for assault and a high-profile sexual misconduct case.

Despite these setbacks, Paycheck's legacy endures through his raw and uncompromising music, which continues to resonate with fans of traditional and outlaw country. A member of the Grand Ole Opry and the subject of tribute albums and documentaries, Paycheck remained active into the early 2000s before health complications, including respiratory failure, bronchial asthma, and emphysema, led to his death in 2003. His life and work have been recognized as emblematic of both the rebellion and the heartbreak that defined a pivotal era in American country music.

== Early life ==
Paycheck was born Donald Eugene Lytle on May 31, 1938 to Chester Eugene Lytle (1915–1988) and Chloie Mae Woodland (1919–2000) in his parents' home in Higginsville, a working class neighborhood of Greenfield, Ohio. He began playing guitar at age six after receiving one from his mother. He began performing in talent shows by the age of nine and was performing professionally by age 15 while riding the rails as a drifter. He often used the stage name "Ohio Kid" when he played in bars and clubs.

After dropping out of junior high school, Paycheck joined the United States Navy in the 1950s but was court-martialed and served two years in military prison for assaulting a superior officer.

== Career ==
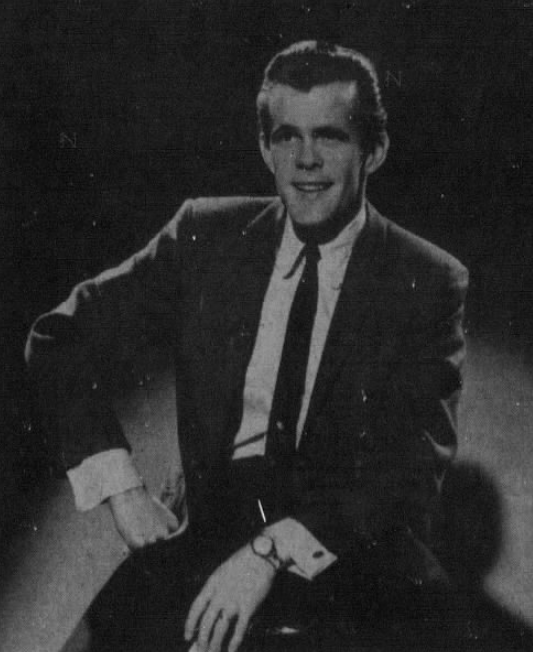
Paycheck in 1971

Following Paycheck's discharge, he moved to Nashville and performed under the names Donny Young and Donald Young while working as a tenor harmony singer for artists like Porter Wagoner, Ray Price, Faron Young, and especially George Jones, with whom he developed a long-lasting rapport. In 1958, he released his debut single, "It's Been a Long, Long Time for Me," under Decca Records. In 1959, he made his debut on the Grand Ole Opry, with his single "Old Man and the River" alongside performing with artists like George Morgan, Bill Anderson, Eddie Noack, Roger Miller, and Roy Wiggins. One year later, in 1960, he reached top-35 status in Cashbox magazine's country charts, with the tune "Miracle of Love." An ad for the Grand Ole Opry in 1964 referred to Paycheck, still referred to as Donny Young, as "the nations newest singing sensation."

Under the mentorship of producer Buddy Killen, Paycheck recorded for Decca Records and Mercury Records before joining George Jones' band, where he played bass, steel guitar, and sang high harmony on at least 15 of Jones' albums, including hits like "The Race Is On" and "Love Bug." He later co-wrote Jones's hit song "Once You've Had the Best." The volatile, alcohol- and drug-fueled partnership between the two was both fruitful and tumultuous, and Paycheck's vocal influence on Jones—and later Merle Haggard—went uncredited for many years.

In 1964, he changed his name legally to Johnny Paycheck, taking the name from Johnny Paychek, a top-ranked boxer from Chicago who once fought Joe Louis for the heavyweight title (and not directly as a humorous alternative to Johnny Cash, as is commonly believed). Working with producer Aubrey Mayhew, Paycheck signed to Little Darlin' Records. His early records being stylistic experiments and were among the most ambitious and emotionally raw entries during the period of country music. That same year, he scored a Grammy-nominated hit with "A-11," written by Hank Cochran. He followed this success with a string of charting singles including "The Lovin' Machine" in 1966 and "Jukebox Charlie" in 1967. From the early to mid 1960s, he also enjoyed some success as a songwriter for others, with his biggest songwriting hit being "Apartment No. 9", which served as Tammy Wynette's first chart hit in December 1966. By the late 1960s, however, Paycheck's career faltered. After Little Darlin' folded at the end of the 1960s, Paycheck struggled with substance and alcohol abuse and homelessness as he drifted through Los Angeles, playing in dive bars and becoming addicted to heroin.

Paycheck's career was revived in 1971 when Billy Sherrill, an executive and producer at Epic Records, offered to work with Paycheck if he could get clean. As a result, Sherrill and Paycheck released "She's All I Got," which reached number two on the Billboard Hot Country Songs chart and was his only single to ever make it to the Billboard Hot 100. Throughout the 1970s, Paycheck had a steady stream of hits including "Someone to Give My Love To," "Slide Off of Your Satin Sheets," "Song and Dance Man," and "I'm the Only Hell (Mama Ever Raised)." After his success faltered after the release of Loving You Beats All I've Ever Seen in 1975, Paycheck released 11 Months and 29 Days which showcased his transition to outlaw country. In 1977, Paycheck recorded "Take This Job and Shove It," written by David Allan Coe. The blue-collar anthem became Paycheck's biggest success, selling over two million copies and inspiring a film of the same name.

To me, an outlaw is a man that did things his own way, whether you liked him or not. I did things my own way.

— Johnny Paycheck

Many of Paycheck's songs during this period acted as exaggerated reflections of his outlaw lifestyle, as seen in titles like "Me and the I.R.S." and "D.O.A. (Drunk on Arrival)." However, his behavior continued to spiral. In 1981, he was again in prison with the stint causing him to miss out on recording the George Strait hit "Unwound", which was initially intended for Paycheck. He was sued for slander by a flight attendant after a mid-air altercation, saddled with a paternity suit, tax issues, and eventually dropped by Epic Records in 1982 after facing sexual assault charges that were later reduced.

After leaving Epic, Paycheck signed with AMI and scored several minor hits between 1984 and 1986. The most successful of Paycheck's later singles, released during his appeal, was "Old Violin" for Mercury Records, which reached number 21 on the country chart in 1986. His last album to chart was Modern Times in 1987. He continued to release albums, the last of which, I'm a Survivor, appeared in 1996 and featured recordings of songs from the mid-1980s. The last release during his lifetime was Remembering, a compilation album in 2002. He continued to perform and tour until the late 1990s.

After prison, Paycheck resumed touring with dates in Branson, Missouri, and recorded for Playback Records. In 1996, the Country Music Foundation issued a retrospective of his Little Darlin' years, which found renewed interest among younger classic-country fans. He also recorded a live album at Gilley's in 1999, released on Atlantic Records. Shortly before his retirement, in 1997, he was inducted into the Grand Ole Opry; in a rare exception to protocol, Opry general manager Bob Whittaker personally invited Paycheck to join instead of having another member do the invitation.

In 1998, Paycheck was airlifted to a hospital in Albuquerque, New Mexico after a severe asthma attack. Around that time, he had signed with Lucky Dog Records, a Sony Music Nashville imprint, with Blake Chancey scheduled to produce a comeback album, but it was ultimately shelved due to Paycheck's deteriorating health.

=== Record companies ===
With his producer, Aubrey Mayhew, Paycheck co-owned his Little Darlin' Records. Paycheck's recordings by Little Darlin' featured the pedal steel guitar work of Lloyd Green. By the end of the 1960s, Little Darlin' Records folded. Mayhew and Paycheck soon created Certron Records, a newly formed recording company owned by Certron (a manufacturer of audio and video tape). The label was able to sign Bobby Helms, Ronnie Dove, Clint Eastwood, Pozo-Seco Singers (as Pozo Seco), and Paycheck. After the move to Certron, the label was unable to make a profit and closed by 1972. In the late 1990s, after decades ignored, Little Darlin' recordings received recognition by country music historians for their distinctive and sharp-edged sound, considered unique in their time—Paycheck's in particular.

== Personal life ==
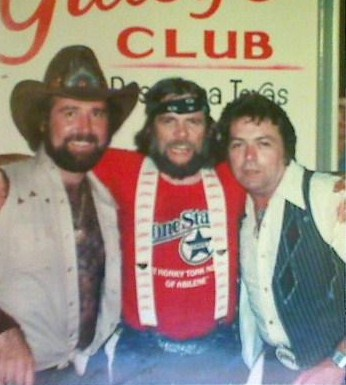
From left to right: Johnny Lee, Paycheck, and Mickey Gilley at Gilley's Nightclub in 1978

Paycheck was married for over 30 years to his wife Sharon Rae and they had one son, Jonathan.

In Paycheck's hometown of Greenfield, he was a polarizing figure. Some residents admired his success and supported him unconditionally, while others criticized his repeated run-ins with the law. According to Roger Ross, editor of The Greenfield Daily Times and a longtime friend, Paycheck was deeply generous, often returning home to perform benefit shows for children's charities and local causes. Though he cultivated an outlaw image, with bandanas, scruffy clothes, and hard-living lyrics, those close to him insisted that his off-stage persona was more caring and down-to-earth.

=== Legal troubles ===
In 1956, Paycheck was court-martialed for assaulting a naval officer and fracturing his skull. While under arraignment, he escaped twice. Paycheck was found guilty and sentenced to 18 years at Portsmouth Naval Prison, but was released from prison in 1959 after having his sentence reduced on appeal.

In 1981, Paycheck was arrested on accusations of statutory rape of a 12-year-old girl in Wyoming. Members of Paycheck's band told police that the singer had numerous problems with allegations because of his celebrity status. He was released on bond. In 1982, he pled no contest to continue his touring and not go to trial. The prosecution's witnesses were reluctant to testify. He pleaded down to a misdemeanor and received a $1,000 fine. A $3 million civil suit resulted from the incident, but the case never made it to a court.

In December 1985, Paycheck was convicted and sentenced to seven years in jail for shooting a man at the North High Lounge in Hillsboro, Ohio; he had fired a .22 pistol, and the bullet grazed the man's head. Paycheck claimed the act was self-defense. After several years spent fighting the sentence, he began serving his sentence in 1989, spending 22 months in prison before being pardoned by Ohio Governor Richard Celeste.

I heard from fans constantly throughout the entire two years. The letters never stopped, from throughout the world. I looked forward to mail call every day.

— Johnny Paycheck, after his release from prison

In 1990, he filed for bankruptcy after tax problems with the Internal Revenue Service, including a $300,000 lien.

=== Health issues and death ===
Although Paycheck was addicted to drugs including alcohol during his career, he later was said to have "put his life in order" after his prison stay.

After 2000, his health would only allow for short appearances. Developing bronchial asthma and emphysema, after a lengthy illness, Paycheck died of respiratory failure at Nashville's Vanderbilt University Medical Center on February 19, 2003, aged 64. He was survived by his wife Sharon and his son Jonathan Paycheck.

He was buried in Woodlawn Memorial Park in Nashville; reportedly, the plot was paid for by George Jones. Among the roughly 200 attendees at Paycheck’s memorial were Jones, Little Jimmy Dickens, and a sizable contingent of Hell's Angels, admirers of the hard-living Paycheck. "By and large, it was the roughest-looking funeral crowd I have ever seen," a Nashville Skyline columnist wrote in CMT.

== Legacy ==
A tribute album, Touch My Heart: a Tribute to Johnny Paycheck, was released in 2004 on the Sugar Hill Label. Produced by Robbie Fulks, the album features George Jones, Marshall Crenshaw, Hank Williams III, Al Anderson, Dallas Wayne, Neko Case, Gail Davies, and Fulks himself, covering some of Paycheck's best-known songs. In his song "Grand Ole Opry (Ain't So Grand Anymore)", Hank Williams III praises Paycheck (along with Waylon Jennings, Johnny Cash, and Hank Williams Jr.) as a "real rebel" the Grand Ole Opry only reluctantly inducted.

His song "It Won't Be Long (And I'll Be Hating You)" appears in the open-world action-adventure video game Grand Theft Auto V.

His song "(Pardon Me) I've Got Someone to Kill" is covered on the album All the Way by Diamanda Galás.

An episode of Mike Judge Presents: Tales from the Tour Bus features an account of Paycheck's life and rise to fame during the outlaw country movement.

== Discography ==
- At Carnegie Hall (1966)
- The Lovin' Machine (1966)
- Gospeltime in My Fashion (1967)
- Jukebox Charlie (1967)
- Country Soul (1968)
- Wherever You Are (1969)
- Again (1970)
- She's All I Got (1971)
- Someone to Give My Love To (1972)
- Somebody Loves Me (1972)
- Heartbreak, Tenn. (1972)
- Mr. Lovemaker (1973)
- Song and Dance Man (1973)
- Loving You Beats All I've Ever Seen (1975)
- 11 Months and 29 Days (1976)
- Slide Off of Your Satin Sheets (1977)
- Take This Job and Shove It (1977)
- Armed and Crazy (1978)
- Bars - Booze - Blondes (1979)
- Everybody's Got a Family... Meet Mine (1979)
- Double Trouble (with George Jones) (1980)
- Mr. Hag Told My Story (1981)
- Lovers and Losers (1982)
- I Don't Need To Know That Right Now (1983)
- Modern Times (1987)
- Outlaw at the Cross (1988)
- The Last Outlaw (1991)
- The Difference in Me (1992)
- Tribute to George Jones (1996)
- I'm a Survivor (1996)
- Studio 102 Essentials (2008)
