= Aubrey Mayhew =

American music producer (1927–2009)

Aubrey Mayhew (October 2, 1927 – March 22, 2009) was an American music producer, songwriter and music services professional. He was the sole owner of Amcorp Music Group in Nashville, Tennessee.

== Personal life ==
Born in Washington, D.C., to Aubrey and Verna Mayhew, he served in the U.S. Army in the Korean War.

His son Parris was a guitarist in the punk band Cro-Mags.

== Career in music ==
In 1946, he became the booker and then the director of the country music radio program Hayloft Jamboree on WCOP (now WWDJ) in Boston, Massachusetts. In the early 1960s, Mayhew began working at Pickwick Records in New York City. At Pickwick, he produced one of the first memorial recordings of President John F. Kennedy after the President's death in 1963. He left Pickwick to start his own record label, Little Darlin', in 1966. The most successful Little Darlin' records were done by the country and western singer and songwriter Johnny Paycheck. Mayhew co-wrote some of Paycheck's songs. At the end of the 1960s, he suspended the Little Darlin' label and launched a new label, Certron. The label was also home to recording star Ronnie Dove, who was transferred there when his label Diamond Records was sold. Although he recorded many songs for Certron, only one was ever released (on a Greatest Hits album). Mayhew also owned Charlie Parker Records before selling the label in 1981.

== Collector of Kennedy memorabilia ==
In 1966, his book The World's Tribute to John F. Kennedy in Medallic Art was published by William Morrow and Company. In 1970, he became known as a Kennedy collector, when he purchased at auction the seven-story warehouse building that had housed the Texas School Book Depository in Dallas, Texas.
