= Gnar Tapes =

- Founded: 2008
- Founder: Erik Gage
- Distributor(s): The Business
- Country of origin: United States
- Location: Los Angeles, California
- Official website: www.gnartapes.com

Gnar Tapes is an independent record label based in Los Angeles, California, United States. Gnar Tapes began releasing solely audio cassette tapes from many Portland-based artists, though it has branched out to releasing artists from around the world via cassette, vinyl, digital, and compact disc. The label was founded in 2008 by Erik Gage, who was 18 years old at the time, in his hometown of Portland, Oregon.

When creating Gnar Tapes, Gage was inspired by DIY tape-culture and based the label's distribution on hand-to-hand trading and mail art. When Gage was in high school, he and his bandmates in White Fang would skip class to intern at Marriage Records. Gnar Tapes has also worked internationally, releasing tapes from Le Elbow (Cape Town, South Africa), Keel Her (Brighton, UK), The Future Dead (Ghent, Belgium), and The Boys Age (Saitama, Japan). Most cassettes on Gnar Tapes are limited editions, being released only once. In 2013 the label began co-releasing tapes with Burger Records.

The label moved to Los Angeles in late 2014 and opened a retail store in East L.A. in partnership with Burger Records in early 2015 called GNAR BURGER. Also in 2015 Gnar obtained sub-label Marriage Records and its vast back catalogue which includes releases by Tune-Yards, Dirty Projectors, Karl Blau amongst others.

== Notable releases ==
- Shine Your Light by Gap Dream (co-release w/ Burger Records)
- The Memories by The Memories
- Blonde Rats/Fear Melody by Lucky Dragons
- Strawberry Moon by Yacht
- Disco Worship Mixtape by Yacht
- Gnarcotics Unanimous (Gnar Tapes artist compilation, including unreleased tracks by Calvin Johnson and the Hive Dwellers and Alex Bleeker of Real Estate)
- Demos, Etc. by Young Prisms
- Four Hours (Away) by Young Prisms (cassingle, co-release w/ Kanine Records)
- Grease by R. Stevie Moore

== Partial roster ==
- Adrian Orange
- Bobby Birdman
- The Courtneys
- E*Rock
- Fat Tony
- Gap Dream
- Little Wings
- Lucky Dragons
- Mental Theo
- R. Stevie Moore
- Wampire
- White Rainbow
- Yacht

== See also ==
- DIY ethic
- Burger Records
- Marriage Records
