= Marriage Records =

- Founded: 2001
- Founder: Curtis Knapp; Adrian Orange
- Distributors: Nail, Southern Records, Chicago Independent, Revolver, The Business
- Genre: Indie, experimental, electronic, freak folk, alt folk
- Country of origin: U.S.
- Location: Portland, Oregon, Los Angeles
- Official website: www.marriagerecs.com

Marriage Records is a small, independent record label formed in Portland, Oregon. It was founded in 2001 by Curtis Knapp and Adrian Orange. The label has released a number of albums by musicians such as Adam Forkner, Dirty Projectors, Little Wings, Lucky Dragons, Tune-Yards, Yacht, and Karl Blau. Artists on the label frequently collaborate and swap members.

Marriage releases vinyl, CDs, CD-Rs, tapes, skateboards, books, posters and apparel. The label has been distributed by Nail Distribution, Southern Records, Chicago Independent, Revolver, and The Business. In 2006 the label began publishing "experimental literature" under the imprint Marriage Publishing House, including Veneer Magazine.

Since 2015, Marriage Records has been based primarily in Los Angeles under the management of Jimmy Leslie of White Fang, a longtime Marriage collaborator.

== Overview ==
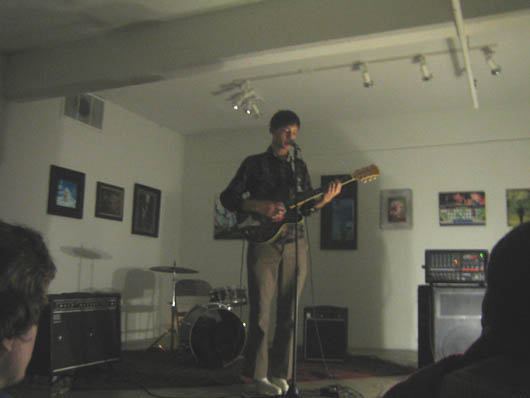
Co-founder Adrian Orange, who has released albums on the label as Thanksgiving, Adrian Orange & Her Band, AOK, and A.O.

=== Founding ===
Marriage Records was co-founded in Portland, Oregon in 2001 by musical collaborators Adrian Orange and Curtis Knapp, with Knapp as "Chief" of the label. Musician and producer Eric Erickson joined as counsel.

Orange (born 1986) had developed a reputation as a songwriter and charismatic performer in the Northwest by his teens, and dropped out of school at age 15 to pursue music full-time. A year later he was performing under the alias Thanksgiving when he met Curtis Knapp at a house show.

According to Knapp, "The first time...[Orange and I] met, it was a big deal for us. Cause our friends had been talking about us to each for a long time. For years. I came in in the middle of the show, I saw like three songs, and we sat outside and smoked cigarettes together. It was really—it was a lot like falling in love." He also stated, "We mounted the label as a document officiator of our time and work together, and of our friends. Thus the name Marriage Records."

=== Development ===
Initially a CD-R-release-only label for the first year and a half of existence, in 2004 it began releasing elaborate packaging schemas with most records. For example, in 2006 the label released 1 box set, 6 CDs, 4 CD/vinyl combos, 1 skateboard, and 1 book. As of 2012, the label's production and distribution costs for bands ranges from 0 to $10,000, including digital-only releases and formats such as tape, CD, CD-R, vinyl, DVDs, and print products, as well as events, packaging, tour management, promotion, and band vans.

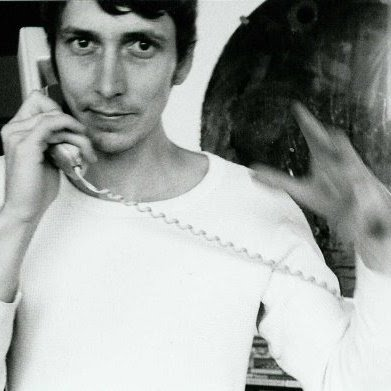
Co-founder Curtis Knapp, who performs in several of the label's bands

The label's first release was Made in Canada by collective group Rob Walmart. The next year Thanksgiving released the EP Nothing on the label. The Watery Graves of Portland, a band which included both Orange and Knapp, was next with The Sea and Skies Above. Within the next few years more bands joined the roster, including Portland musician Jona Bechtolt (of Yacht), Viking Moses, World, and Brad Adkins. Artists signed to the label frequently play together, swap members, and form short or long-term superbands.

According to Knapp: "The label learned everything and grew through its artists. It wasn't the other way around. This place–the community of music here; Marriage Records is totally a function of that." Adrian Orange released an album with K Records in Olympia, Washington in 2007, and artists on the two labels have frequently collaborated.

In 2006, Brooklyn band Dirty Projectors released their New Attitude EP on the label. According to bandmember Dave Longstreth, Marriage Records was an important influence on their early sound, saying "I love a lot of the music that my friends have made up in Portland. I feel like it has totally affected who I am and what kind of things I ended up making—people like Adrian Orange, Adam Forkner, and Curtis..." In 2007, the Seattle Stranger interviewed Steven Malkmus of Pavement who stated "There's just crazy stuff [going on in Portland]... Marriage Records, this guy Curtis, has got some good stuff."

The label and the associated bands were featured in episode five of the series Don't Move Here, titled "Marriage Records and Rob Walmart" (2010). It interviewed label owners Knapp and Adam Forkner about the history and family ethics behind the operation, learned about Forkner's solo act White Rainbow, and taped a guerrilla street performance from the collective group Rob Walmart.

The first five editions of Veneer Magazine from Marriage Publishing House

Knapp and Flint Jamison also co-founded the Portland arts space Yale Union (YU), where a number of the label's bands have recorded music. Around 2005 the label released Live At The Artistery, featuring bands that had used the now closed venue space The Artistery, a youth-run arts community.

=== Marriage Publishing House ===
The label created the imprint Marriage Publishing House (MPH) in March 2003, which publishes "experimental literature." Its first project was Tom Blood's poetry book The Sky Position, which won the 2007 Stafford/Hall award for poetry from Literary Arts Inc.'s Oregon Book Awards.

In 2007 it started publishing Veneer Magazine. Veneer has included contributions from contemporary artists, writers, inventors, technicians, and musicians such as Adrian Piper, George Kuchar, GoodiePal, Elaine Sturtevant, Kevin Kelly and Ray Kurzweil.

== Associations ==
Artists

- Adam Forkner
- Adrian Orange
- Brad Adkins (visual artist)
- Dirty Projectors
- James V
- Jordan Dykstra
- Karl Blau
- Thanksgiving
- Tune-Yards
- Little Wings
- Lucky Dragons
- Matthew Stadler (writer)
- Moon Grass Mountain
- Mount Eerie
- Parenthetical Girls
- Viking Moses
- World
- White Rainbow
- Yacht
- mise en abyme
- Caspar Sonnet

Entities

- Clear Cut Press (Portland)
- Department of Safety (Anacortes, WA)
- Gnar Tapes (Los Angeles)
- K Records (Olympia, WA)
- P. W. Elverum & Sun (Anacortes)
- States Rights Records (Portland)
- Veneer Magazine (Portland)
