= Mandarin Dynasty =

American DIY pop band

- Origin: Encinitas, California, United States
- Genres: DIY pop; folk; lo-fi
- Years active: 2004–Present
- Labels: Bridgetown Records, Trabuco Records, Keeled Scales
- Members: Mike Sherk; Zach Burba; Carly Toyer

Mandarin Dynasty is a band fronted by Mike Sherk, formed in Encinitas, California in 2004. The group is best known for extensively touring the American DIY music scene, as well as for releasing several bedroom pop albums, including Sea Legs (2005) and Perpendicular Crosstalk (2011).

Mandarin Dynasty's lineup has at times included members of Deer Tick and Dear Nora. The band's songs have been covered by such acts as Diamond Rugs (a supergroup featuring members of Los Lobos, Black Lips and Dead Confederate). Mandarin Dynasty's use of layered vocal harmonies and unconventional instrumentation has led press to compare the group to both The Beach Boys and Neutral Milk Hotel.

== History ==
Mandarin Dynasty formed in 2004 as a recording outlet for Mike Sherk. The band released several EPs before recording a full-length album in 2005, titled Sea Legs. Soon after forming, the band began playing shows within the American independent music scene, embarking on extensive tours with Viking Moses, Deer Tick, Stephen Steinbrink & French Quarter, and Thanksgiving. Mandarin Dynasty has also performed on bills with notable bands like Why?, YACHT, The Blow, and Mount Eerie.

In September 2011, Mandarin Dynasty released Perpendicular Crosstalk through the influential underground cassette label Bridgetown Records. The album was recorded by Sherk at various studios and homes around Michigan, Ohio, Rhode Island, Texas, and California; The often-unconventional recording locations included an overnight setup at a church in Long Beach and a condemned practice space near the San Diego Sports Arena. The album was performed solo by Sherk, with guest appearances by John McCauley (of Deer Tick), Kevin Ferguson, and Taryn Popplewell. Perpendicular Crosstalk received positive reviews from In Your Speakers and Impose, while earning the band comparisons to the production styles of Brian Wilson, Neutral Milk Hotel and of Montreal. The album was re-released on vinyl by Trabuco Records in January 2014.

In 2012, Mandarin Dynasty’s song "I Took Note" was covered by the band Diamond Rugs (a supergroup featuring members of Los Lobos, Black Lips, Six Finger Satellite, Dead Confederate and Deer Tick) on their 2012 self-titled album. The track was noted as a highlight of the album by NPR Music and Paste Magazine. Fresh Air music contributor Ken Tucker stated that Sherk's song detailed "the ways in which a budding artist might prepare to create worthwhile art, suffering for it even as it yields an endearing melody."

By 2014, Mandarin Dynasty had relocated to Portland, Oregon, and the band's regular lineup had grown to include Zach Burba and Carly Toyer. In 2015 the album Feedback Time was released.

Burba moved to Seattle where is formed Iji and released the albums Whatever Will Happen (2015) and Bubble (2016) on Team Love Records.

== Discography ==
=== Albums ===
- Sea Legs (2005)
- Perpendicular Crosstalk (2011 / 2014)
- Feedback Time (2015)

=== EPs ===
- Ave Pico (2004)
- I Am Ready For the Winter Again (2004)
- Pinq is the New Blaq - split with Actual Birds (2006)
