= More Fuel for the Fire =

More Fuel For the Fire (EP)

EP by Deer Tick
- Released: January 1, 2010
- Recorded: 2009
- Genre: Indie rock, alternative country
- Label: Partisan Records

Deer Tick chronology
Born on Flag Day (2009)	More Fuel For the Fire (EP) (2010)	The Black Dirt Sessions (2010)

More Fuel For the Fire is an EP released by American indie-rock band Deer Tick. It was released between their second album Born on Flag Day and their third album The Black Dirt Sessions. More Fuel For the Fire was released on Partisan Records.

== Track listing ==
All music is composed by Deer Tick.

No.	Title	Length
1.	"La La La"	2:16
2.	"Dance of Love"	1:54
3.	"Axe Is Forever"	3:37
4.	"Straight Into a Storm (Live from the Visulite Theatre, Charlotte, NC)" (a live version of the same track from Born on Flag Day)	3:14

Professional ratings
Review scores
Source	Rating
Slant Magazine	3.5/5 stars
