= I Can Feel You Creep Into My Private Life =

Studio album by Tune-Yards
- Released: January 19, 2018
- Genres: Indie pop; alternative dance; art pop
- Length: 42:12
- Label: 4AD
- Producers: Nate Brenner; Merrill Garbus

Tune-Yards chronology
| Nikki Nack (2014) | I Can Feel You Creep Into My Private Life (2018) | Sketchy (2021) |

Singles from I Can Feel You Creep Into My Private Life
- 1. "Look at Your Hands" Released: October 27, 2017; 2. "Heart Attack" Released: January 11, 2018

I Can Feel You Creep Into My Private Life is the fourth full-length release by Merrill Garbus' project Tune-Yards. It was released on 4AD Records on January 19, 2018. Nate Brenner is also listed as a collaborator. The album was mixed by Mikaelin BlueSpruce. The majority of the album was recorded at Tiny Telephone Studios in Oakland and mastered in Harlem, New York, by Dave Kutch.

== Musical style ==
I Can Feel You Creep Into My Private Life has more electronic influences than Garbus's previous work. It is inspired by Haitian and Kenyan music, as well her life as a DJ in California. The album's themes include feminism, race intolerance, and freedom. Identity politics are the main focus of the album; Garbus said the work was inspired by a desire to "resonate with what's going on in the world."

== Reception ==
Professional ratings
Aggregate scores
| Source | Rating |
|---|---|
| AnyDecentMusic? | 7.3/10 |
| Metacritic | 78/100 |
Review scores
| Source | Rating |
| AllMusic | 4/5 stars |
| The A.V. Club | B+ |
| Chicago Tribune | 3.5/4 stars |
| The Guardian | 4/5 stars |
| NME | 4/5 stars |
| The Observer | 4/5 stars |
| Pitchfork | 6.2/10 |
| Q | 3/5 stars |
| Rolling Stone | 4/5 stars |
| Vice | A− |

Upon release, the album was met positively. It holds a current score of 78/100 on review aggregator Metacritic, indicating "generally favorable reviews".

== Track listing ==
All tracks are written by Merrill Garbus and Nate Brenner.

| No. | Title | Length |
|---|---|---|
| 1. | "Heart Attack" | 3:43 |
| 2. | "Coast to Coast" | 3:55 |
| 3. | "ABC 123" | 3:34 |
| 4. | "Now As Then" | 3:52 |
| 5. | "Honesty" | 3:38 |
| 6. | "Colonizer" | 3:54 |
| 7. | "Look at Your Hands" | 3:46 |
| 8. | "Home" | 4:18 |
| 9. | "Hammer" | 3:15 |
| 10. | "Who Are You" | 3:17 |
| 11. | "Private Life" | 3:20 |
| 12. | "Free" | 3:41 |
| Total length: | | 42:12 |

== Personnel ==
Tune-Yards

- Merrill Garbus – performance, production, programming, engineering assistance
- Nate Brenner – performance, production, engineering assistance (all tracks); programming (track 11); cover photo

Additional contributors

- David Kutch – mastering
- Mikaelin Bluespruce – mixing (1–11)
- Beau Sorenson – mixing (12), engineering (all tracks)
- Nico Segal – engineering (all tracks), programming (1, 4)
- Nate Fox – engineering (all tracks), programming (1, 4)
- Maryam Qudus – string engineering, engineering assistance
- Deborah Benedict – vocal technician
- Alison Fielding – layout
- Ginger Fierstein – photography
- Eric Mortensen – poster design

== Charts ==
| Chart (2018) | Peak position |
|---|---|
| Belgian Albums (Ultratop Flanders) | 67 |
| Scottish Albums (Official Charts) | 98 |
| UK Independent Albums (Official Charts) | 10 |
| US Independent Albums (Billboard) | 11 |
| US Top Album Sales (Billboard) | 62 |
| US Indie Store Album Sales (Billboard) | 5 |
| US Vinyl Albums (Billboard) | 10 |
