= Bird-Brains =

Studio album by Tune-Yards
- Released: June 9, 2009
- Genre: Lo-fi
- Length: 53:49
- Labels: Marriage; 4AD

Tune-Yards chronology
Bird-Brains (2009)	Whokill (2011)

Bird-Brains (stylized as BiRd-BrAiNs) is the debut album by American lo-fi musician Merrill Garbus' project Tune-Yards. It was originally released as a Compact Cassette on Marriage Records on June 9, 2009, and was re-released on August 17 by 4AD as a limited-edition pressing. It was released worldwide on November 16, 2009, with two bonus tracks.

The album was recorded almost exclusively by Garbus on a hand recorder and mixed using Audacity. Speaking to Charlotte Richardson Andrews of The Guardian, she noted her instrumental limitations and how they led to a dependence on percussion: "I had no bass – literally, I didn't own one – so the drums had to be big."

== Critical reception ==
Professional ratings
Aggregate scores
Source	Rating
AnyDecentMusic?	7.3/10
Metacritic	79/100
Review scores
Source	Rating
AllMusic	4/5 stars
Drowned in Sound	8/10
The Guardian	5/5 stars
The Irish Times	3/5 stars
MSN Music (Consumer Guide)	A
MusicOMH	4/5 stars
Pitchfork	6.8/10
PopMatters	7/10

Pitchfork ranked Bird-Brains at number 44 on their list of the top 50 albums of 2009.

== Track listing ==
All tracks are written by Merrill Garbus.

No.	Title	Length
1.	"For You"	1:50
2.	"Sunlight"	3:47
3.	"Lions"	4:59
4.	"Hatari"	5:39
5.	"News"	3:24
6.	"Jamaican"	3:54
7.	"Jumping Jack"	3:54
8.	"Little Tiger"	4:59
9.	"Safety"	4:37
10.	"Fiya"	5:28
11.	"Synonynonym"	3:50
12.	"Want Me To" (bonus track)	4:24
13.	"Real Live Flesh" (bonus track)	3:33

- The vinyl edition does not include the track "Synonynonym" and instead ends with "Fiya".
