= What Kind of Fool Am I? =

- Swedish release picture sleeve

Single by Sammy Davis Jr.

from the album What Kind of Fool Am I and Other Show-Stoppers
- B-side: "Gonna Build a Mountain"
- Released: 1962
- Genre: Easy listening, R&B
- Length: 2:58
- Label: Reprise
- Songwriters: Leslie Bricusse; Anthony Newley

Sammy Davis Jr. singles chronology
"Bye Bye Blackbird" (1962)	"What Kind of Fool Am I?" (1962)	"Gonna Build a Mountain" (1962)

"What Kind of Fool Am I?" is a popular song written by Leslie Bricusse and Anthony Newley and published in 1962. It was introduced by Anthony Newley in the musical Stop the World – I Want to Get Off. It comes at the end of Act Two to close the show. Bricusse and Newley received the 1961 Ivor Novello award for Best Song Musically and Lyrically. At the 1963 Grammy Awards, it won the award for Song of the Year and was the first by Britons to do so.

== Background ==
This song was recorded whilst Newley was on the road with this production in the United States, after its successful run in the United Kingdom. By the time the cast reached New York, Tony Bennett had re-recorded the song.

== Cover versions ==
- The song was a hit for Sammy Davis Jr. in the year of its publication, peaking at No. 17 on the Billboard Hot 100 chart and at No. 6 on the Billboard Easy Listening chart.
- Andy Williams included the song on his 1963 album Days of Wine and Roses and Other TV Requests.
- In 1963, Shirley Bassey released this song as a Columbia Record single and her version reached No. 38 (Australia) and No. 47 (UK).
- Lesley Gore included a version of the song on her 1963 debut album, I'll Cry If I Want To.
- Sergio Franchi covered this song on his 1963 album Broadway, I Love You.
- George Maharis covered the song on his 1963 album Just Turn Me Loose!
- Perry Como covered the song on his 1963 release The Songs I Love.
- In 1964, jazz pianist Vince Guaraldi featured a latin jazz cover on his album The Latin Side of Vince Guaraldi. A live version appeared on The Navy Swings the following year (not released until 2010).
- P. J. Proby recorded the song for his third album P J Proby...In Town (1965).
- Italian crooner Johnny Dorelli performed the song in English in 1966, followed by an Italian version (as "Che Uomo Inutile" on his 1967 album L'Immensità.
- Lesser chart records were recorded by: Robert Goulet and the writer, Anthony Newley. James Brown recorded "What Kind of Fool Am I?" for his 1970 album Soul on Top.
- Bill Evans recorded the song for his album Alone (Again) in December 1975, not released until 1977. Various other recordings of it by Evans are also available.
- Jacky Terrasson and Tom Harrell included the song in their 1991 album Moon and Sand.
- "What Kind of Fool Am I?" is also known as the signature song of Regine Velasquez. Done in a power ballad style and with powerful vocals, the song reached platinum status on its 1994 CD-release and is included on her multiplatinum international album Listen Without Prejudice. It achieved at least 2× platinum per Asian country in the cited year.
- The American indie folk rock band Deer Tick recorded a cover of the song on their 2007 album War Elephant.
- Clay Aiken recorded the song on his 2010 album Tried and True.
- Brian Stokes Mitchell recorded the song for his 2012 album Simply Broadway.

== Parodies and popular culture ==
- Allan Sherman parodied the song as "One Hippopotami" on his 1963 album My Son, the Nut.
- Kermit the Frog performed this song on The Ed Sullivan Show on May 31, 1970, where he was repeatedly interrupted by the Sesame Street character Grover. Several other Muppet monsters made cameo appearances in the finale.
- The song was the inspiration for a Gary Larson cartoon depicting scientists examining human subjects with the caption "Yes, they're all fools, gentlemen... But the question remains, 'What KIND of fools are they?'".
