= Aaron Flint Jamison =

American conceptual artist and educator

Aaron Flint Jamison (born 1979) is an American conceptual artist and associate professor in the University of Washington School of Art + Art History + Design. He works with various media including sculpture, publication, video, and performance.

== Life and work ==
Jamison was born in Billings, Montana.

He co-founded the artist-run center Department of Safety (2002–2010) in Anacortes, Washington, and he was a co-founder of the art center Yale Union (YU) in Portland, Oregon. "Yale Union (YU) operated as a non-profit exhibition, production, and community space since 2010 through 2020, when it completed the transfer of ownership of the land and building to the Native Arts and Cultures Foundation (NACF)." "The transfer of the Yale Union to NACF to support the cultural continuance of Indigenous communities is unprecedented, a first,” said Joy Harjo, Mvskoke poet and former poet laureate of the United States.

Jamison is the founder and editor-in-chief of Veneer Magazine, a subscription-based art publication. Veneer is an 18-issue publication, the issues of which are, "lavishly produced, combining different paper stocks, and analogue and digital print techniques."

Jamison's work is held in the permanent collection of the Whitney Museum of American Art.

== Exhibitions ==
=== Solo exhibitions ===
- Artists Space, New York (2013)
- Miguel Abreu Gallery, New York (2015)
- Air de Paris, Paris (2015)
- Miguel Abreu Gallery, New York (2017)
- Galerie Max Mayer, Düsseldorf (2017)
- Miguel Abreu Gallery, New York (2019)
- Opportunity Zones, Kunst Halle Sankt Gallen, (2019)

=== Group exhibitions ===
- Frozen Lakes, Artists Space (2013)
- Sequence 5, Miguel Abreu Gallery, New York (2014)
- Liverpool Biennial, Liverpool (2014)
- Collected by Thea Westreich Wagner and Ethan Wagner, Whitney Museum of American Art (2015–2016)
- Incorporated! Ateliers de Rennes - Biennale d'art Contemporain (2016)
- Whitney Biennial (2017)
- Mechanisms, CCA Wattis, San Francisco (2017)
- Signal or Noise | The Photographic II, S.M.A.K., Ghent (2018–2019)
