= Kam Franklin =

American singer

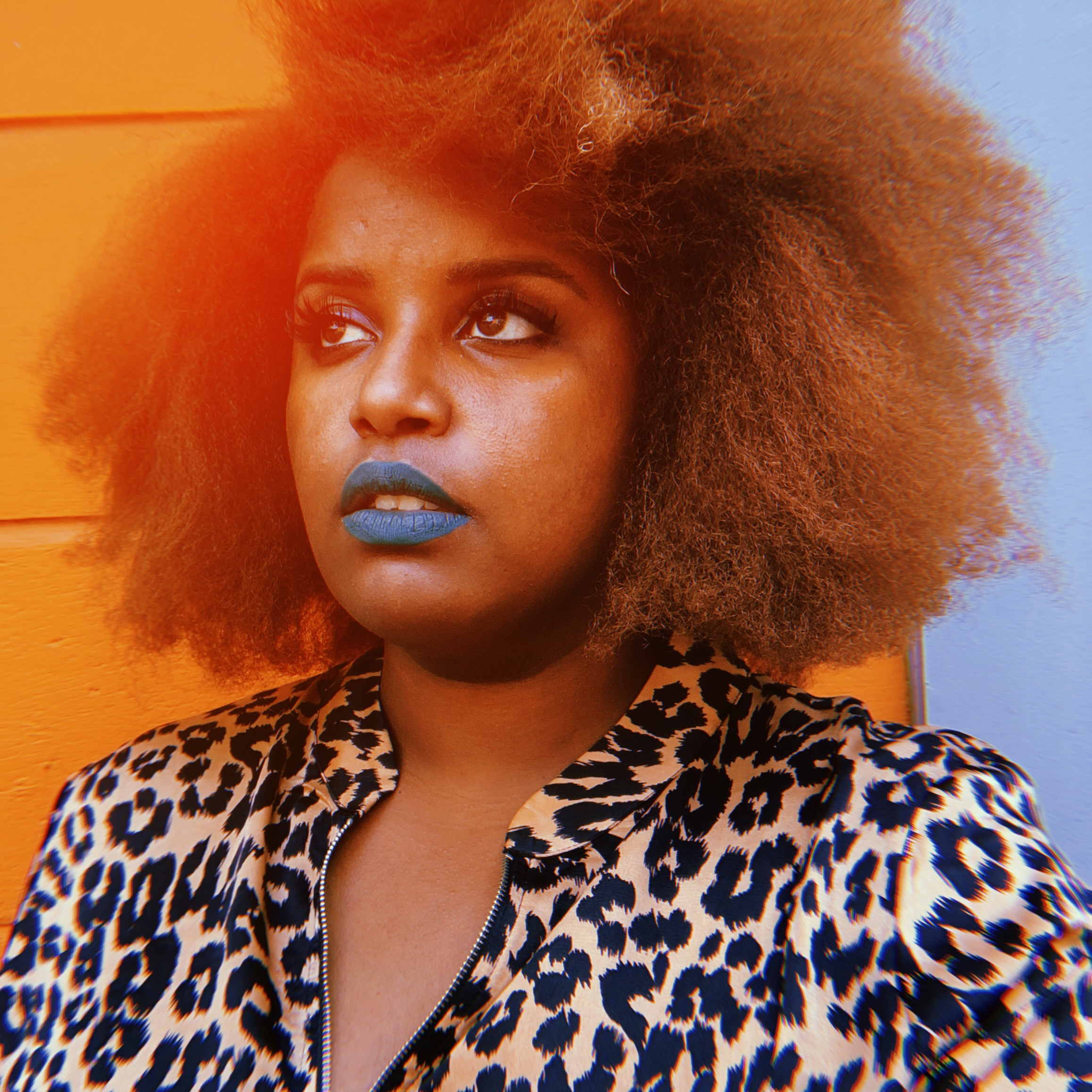
- Self-portrait photograph

Background information
- Born: Kamerra Jodale Franklin; June 7, 1987 (age 39)
- Origin: Bryan–College Station, Bryan, Texas, U.S.
- Genres: Soul, R&B, Ska, Indie rock, Reggae, Hip hop, Americana
- Occupations: Singer, songwriter
- Instrument: Vocals
- Years active: 2005–present
- Label: Unsigned
- Website: kamfranklin.com

Kamerra Jodale Franklin (born June 7, 1987), known professionally as Kam Franklin, is a Grammy Award-winning American singer-songwriter, performance artist, activist, writer and orator. She is known as the lead singer for the Houston soul group The Suffers. She began her career as a backing vocalist and dancer, and has toured with Jim James, Ruthie Foster, Margo Price, and the Very Best.

== Background ==
Franklin is known for her soulful mezzo-soprano vocals, as well as her collaborations with artists across many different genres, including Houston rappers Z-Ro and Fat Tony (rapper), Americana-rocker Matthew Logan Vasquez of Delta Spirit, famed drummers Chris Tsagakis of RX Bandits and The Sound of Animals Fighting, and her production mentor Jim Eno of Spoon.

== Career ==
=== 2008–2017: Background career ===
Franklin was nominated for the 2008, 2009, and 2011 Houston Press Music Award for Best Female Vocalist. Franklin finally won the award in 2012, and again in 2014. Her band, The Suffers, took home The 2012 Houston Press music award for "Best New Act" and Best Reggae/Ska/Dub. Franklin won 2014 and 2015 Houston Press Music Award for Local Musician of the Year.

Franklin was featured in a national advertising campaign for ModCloth and has been featured in a BuzzFeed article on fashion for plus-sized women.

Franklin was in Houston when Hurricane Harvey hit in 2017 and gave an account of it to the Texas Monthly newspaper.

== 2018–present: Career highlights ==
In 2018, Franklin released a single with the Tejano group La Mafia.

In 2022, she founded the Bayou City Comeback Chorus, a Houston-based collective supported by a grant from the Houston Arts Alliance. The project resulted in a four-song EP released on her Homegirl Island Records label. The Bayou City Comeback Chorus focuses on themes of healing, racial justice, and community resilience.

In 2023 Franklin released the single "Byrd and Shepard," dedicated to the memory of James Byrd Jr. and Matthew Shepard. Proceeds from the release supported the Byrd Foundation for Racial Healing and the Matthew Shepard Foundation.

In June 2025, Franklin funded her debut solo album through Kickstarter, surpassing its USD 20,000 goal within 11 days.

In 2025 she contributed vocals to A Tribute to the King of Zydeco, a compilation album honoring Clifton Chenier. The album won the Grammy Award for Best Regional Roots Music Album at the 2026 Grammy Awards. Franklin is credited as a contributing vocalist on the album.

== Influences ==
Her primary musical influences are drawn from soul, country, gospel, reggae and rock music.

== Appearances ==
On August 28, 2016, she performed lead vocals on "I Against I" during the 2016 Afropunk Festival Power Jam alongside Bad Brains, Living Colour, and Fishbone. She has performed with the Suffers on the Late Show with David Letterman, The Daily Show and Jimmy Kimmel Live!. She sang the National Anthem before a Houston Astros game at Minute Maid Park in August 2017. On November 8, 2025, she performed on Austin City Limits alongside the Antone's 50th All-stars.

== Critical reception ==
Franklin is often praised for her "massive voice". The Edmonton Journal applauded her "vibrant grooves and emphatic vocal declarations", while 303 Magazine referred to her "highly personal style". The Seattle Weekly called her "the epitome of a powerhouse vocalist". The Idaho Statesman called her the band's "powerhouse singer". JamBase said that Franklin and her band had become "WXPN Fan darlings". Jewelry designer Jessie Dugan said that Franklin is the "contemporary vision of rockstar royalty in a world where women reign". Houston Public Media stated that "the Suffers are fantastic, and everybody wants lead singer Kam Franklin to be their big sis/best friend". The Houstonia magazine called her a "burgeoning Houston style icon" with "engaging, high-energy style". CultureMap.com said "While rocketing to fame, Franklin has become the band's style icon by pairing colorful dresses with hip cowboy boots and funky jewelry". In a live concert review, the Houston Press said "The crowd roared with Franklin extra wispy, almost ready to let her arms and joints do all the talking for her". Describing a duet with Clay Melton, Broadway World said: "Kam's soulful, sexy tones embellish the more raspy masculine voice of Clay Melton and together they lay down a track that begs a closer listen." The New Orleans' Times-Picayune said "Singer Kam Franklin has enough soul to melt away the decades between the band's source material and today." The San Diego Reader talked about her "sonic gravity".

The Austin American-Statesman wrote: "Houston’s diversity and internationalism is reflected in my favorite H-Town bands. The Suffers, fronted by vocal powerhouse Kam Franklin, blend reggae, Mexican influences and hints of bayou Cajun sounds into a mix they call Gulf Coast soul. Khruangbin mixes surf pop and psychedelic sounds with Thai funk of the 1960s."

== Discography ==
=== Solo Studio albums ===
- (2008) – Bamitskam (EP)
- (2018) – Nu Metals (EP)

=== The Suffers ===
- (2013) "Slow it Down" b/w "Step Aside" (single)
- (2014) "Make Some Room" (EP)
- (2016) The Suffers (album)
- (2018) "Everything Here" (album)
- (2022) "It Starts With Love" (album)

=== Other appearances ===
- 2009 – Nick Gaitan and The Umbrella Man – Self Titled
- 2010 – RABDARGAB – Fat Tony (rapper) ("Not Now")
- 2010 – Horse shoes and Hand Grenades – Nosaprise
- 2011 – SCREWDARGAB Chopped-Up, Not Slopped Up by OG RON C – Fat Tony (rapper) ("Not Now")
- 2011 – Disaster – Chris Tsagakis
- 2011 – Revelator – Sideshow Tramps ("Revelator")
- 2012 – 24KT GOLD – DIRTY AND NASTY Featuring Hollywood Floss
- 2016 – Tomorrow Never Comes – Funk in the Trunk Featuring Neko
- 2017 – Matthew Logan Vasquez – "Same"
- 2017 - "Once Upon A Time" - with Scarface (rapper) and Starlito
- 2018 – Z-ro – "Hi Hater"
- 2018 – La Mafia – "Enamorada"
- 2021 - Jackie Venson - "Down by the Riverside/ Up Above My Head"
- 2021 - Har Mar Superstar - "Another Century"
- 2023 - Khruangbin & Friends - "Live at Stubbs"
- 2023 - Deer Tick (band) - "Emotional Contracts"
- 2024 - The Tennessee Freedom Singers - "Tennessee Rise"
- 2024 - Young Jimmy - "HEAVY. (feat. Kam Franklin)"
- 2025 - Antones's 50th Allstars - The Last Real Texas Blues Album (Vinyl & CD)
- 2025 - Various artists - A Tribute to the King of Zydeco (Vinyl & CD)

== Filmography ==
Film
Year	Title	Role	Notes
2018	Nothing Really Happens	Health Department Operator	Voice role
