= Tune-Yards =

American music project

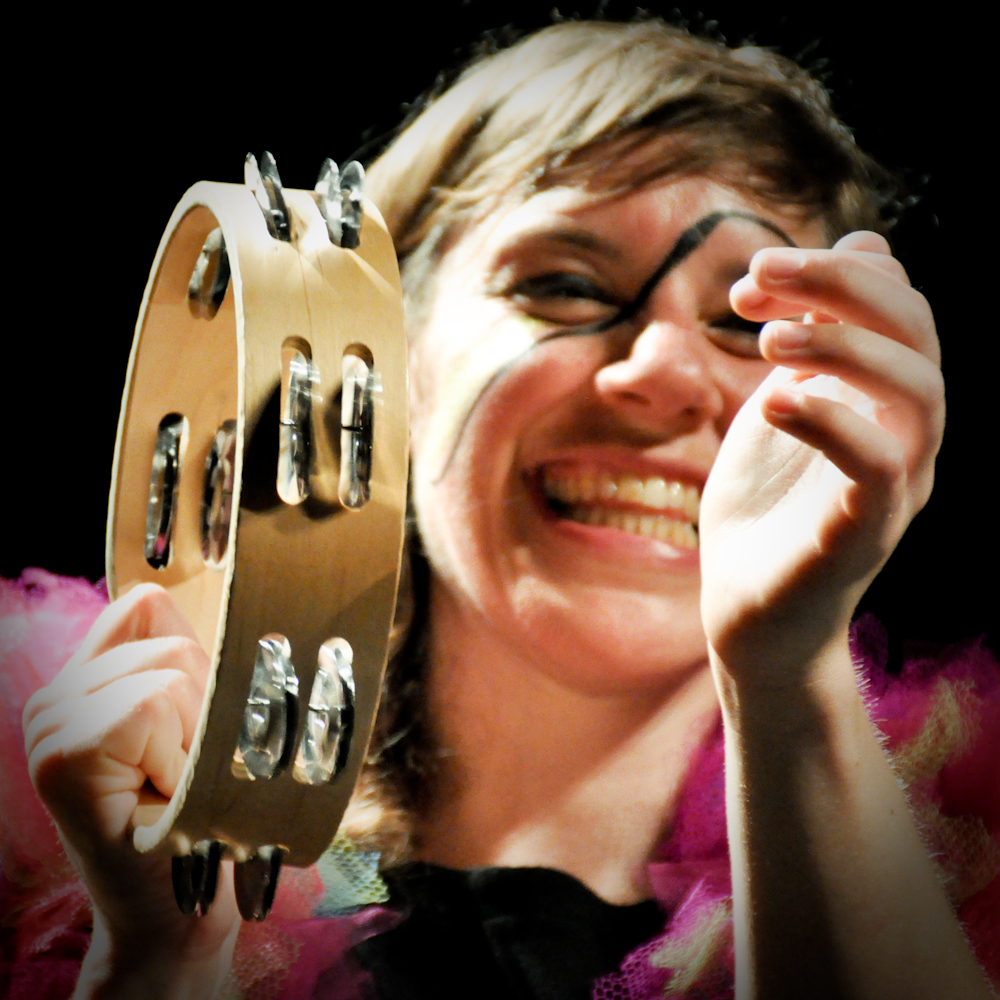
- Garbus performing at Café de la Danse in Paris, France, on June 2, 2011

Background information
- Origin: New Canaan, Connecticut, United States
- Genres: Art pop, indie pop, worldbeat
- Years active: 2006–present
- Labels: 4AD, Marriage
- Members: Merrill Garbus; Nate Brenner
- Website: tune-yards.com

Tune-Yards (stylized as tUnE-yArDs) is the Oakland, California–based music project of Merrill Garbus (vocals, various instruments) and Nate Brenner (bass, various instruments). Garbus's music draws from an eclectic variety of sources and uses elements such as loop pedals, ukulele, vocals, and lo-fi percussion. Tune-Yards’ 2011 album Whokill was ranked the number one album of that year in The Village Voice's annual Pazz and Jop critics’ poll.

The album Nikki Nack was released in 2014, with its first single, "Water Fountain", being picked up by Google Pixel in 2016 for an advertising campaign. The album I Can Feel You Creep Into My Private Life was released in January 2018. At the same time, Tune-Yards provided an atmospheric score for the sci-fi film Sorry to Bother You. The duo released their fifth studio album, Sketchy, in 2021 and their sixth studio album, Better Dreaming, in 2025.

== History and work ==
Born in 1979, Garbus was raised in New York City and in New Canaan, Connecticut. She attended Smith College. She was a puppeteer for the Sandglass Theater in Vermont and lived in Montreal where she played ukulele in the band Sister Suvi with guitarist Patrick Gregoire and drummer Nico Dann. Merrill's sister Ruth Garbus is also a musician who has played solo and in the band Happy Birthday. After releasing her first Tune-Yards album in 2008, she moved to Oakland, where her partner in Tune-Yards, Nate Brenner, also lives.

The first Tune-Yards album, Bird-Brains (stylized as BiRd-BrAiNs) was originally self-released by Garbus on recycled cassette tape. It was recorded using only a handheld voice recorder. A limited edition vinyl was released in June 2009, via the Portland-based imprint Marriage Records. In July 2009, it was announced that Tune-Yards had signed to 4AD, and a limited edition pressing of Bird-Brains was released on August 17, 2009. A full worldwide release followed on November 16, 2009 (and November 17 in North America). The autumn 2009 pressing was remastered at Abbey Road Studios by Christian Wright, and includes two new bonus tracks: "Want Me To" and "Real Live Flesh."

A second album, Whokill (stylized as w h o k i l l), was released on April 19, 2011. A single from it, "Bizness", came out in February 2011. It was produced by Garbus and engineered by Eli Crews at New, Improved Studios in Oakland. Applying the live approach to Garbus' studio work for the first time, Garbus works with bass player Nate Brenner, who co-wrote some of the album's songs. Comparing the act to Sonic Youth, Frontier Psychiatrist said, "if Bird-Brains was Garbus' Evol, a record bursting with musical ideas that attempted to subvert the notion of song, who kill is Garbus' Sister, a record that embraces the traditional pop song as a vehicle to convey those ideas." The album as well as singles "Bizness" and "Gangsta" received mention on many top 2011 album and song lists, including Time, Rolling Stone, Spin, and the New York Times. In early 2012, the Village Voice's annual "Pazz and Jop" poll of critics named Whokill the No. 1 album of 2011. The song "Fiya" is featured on a 2010 commercial for the Blackberry Torch, while the song "Gangsta" has been used in the television shows Orange Is the New Black, Letterkenny, Weeds and The Good Wife and the song "Bizness" was used in Season 3 of Transparent.

Garbus started recording material for her third LP during the latter half of 2013, with a working title of Sink-o. A May 6, 2014 release date was later announced with the title Nikki Nack. The album spawned three singles, including "Water Fountain", which was featured in the soundtrack for EA Sports video game FIFA 15 as well as in a 2016 commercial for the Google Pixel.

A fourth album was released on January 19, 2018, called I Can Feel You Creep Into My Private Life. The album showed more of an electronic influence. The single "Look at Your Hands" was released earlier, in October 2017, followed by "Heart Attack" in January.

The Tune-Yards scored the satiric science fiction film Sorry to Bother You (2018). The film was shown at Sundance in January, then began a theatrical run in July. Its soundtrack songs are performed by the Coup, fronted by the film's director, Boots Riley. Riley said he started working with Tune-Yards in "early 2015" to create the film's score, with demo tracks already available before the script was complete, and before the start of principal photography. Riley said he was attracted to Garbus's voice, and to the band's "unorthodox use of percussion and vocal layering." Garbus also composed the theme music for The New Yorker Radio Hour.

In 2021, Tune-Yards appeared as the opening performance for Google I/O with Artificial Intelligence powered vocal accompaniment.

== Members ==
- Merrill Garbus – vocals, ukulele, percussion (2006–present)
- Nate Brenner – bass guitar (2009–present)

=== Touring members ===
- Hamir Atwal – percussion (I Can Feel You Creep Into My Private Life tour, Sketchy tour)
- Noah Bernstein – saxophone (Whokill tour)
- Haley Dekle - percussion, vocals (Nikki Nack tour)
- Kasey Knudsen – saxophone (Whokill tour)
- Jo Lampert – vocals (Nikki Nack tour)
- Dani Markham – percussion, vocals (Nikki Nack tour)
- Matt Nelson – saxophone (Whokill tour)
- Abigail Nessen-Bengson – vocals (Nikki Nack tour)
- Moira Smiley – vocals (Nikki Nack tour)

== Discography ==
=== Studio albums ===
List of studio albums, with selected chart positions
Title	Details	Peak chart positions									
Title	Details	US	US Indie	US Rock	AUS Hit.	BEL (FL)	BEL (WA)	IRE	SCO	UK	UK Indie
Bird-Brains	Released: June 9, 2009; Label: Marriage/4AD	—	—	—	—	—	—	—	—	—	—
Whokill	Released: April 19, 2011; Label: 4AD	148	26	37	—	49	—	55	—	135	17
Nikki Nack	Released: May 6, 2014; Label: 4AD	27	4	8	15	51	152	—	90	57	11
I Can Feel You Creep Into My Private Life	Released: January 19, 2018; Label: 4AD	— (Note: I Can Feel You Creep Into My Private Life did not enter the US Billboard 200, but peaked at number 62 on the Album Sales Chart.)	11	— (Note: I Can Feel You Creep Into My Private Life did not enter the Top Rock Albums chart, but peaked at number 18 on the Rock Album Sales chart.)	—	67	—	—	98	— (Note: I Can Feel You Creep Into My Private Life did not enter the UK Albums Chart, but peaked at number 78 on the UK Album Downloads Chart.)	10
Sketchy	Released: March 26, 2021; Label: 4AD	— (Note: Sketchy did not enter the US Billboard 200, but peaked at number 69 on the Current Album Sales Chart.)	—	—	—	—	—	—	—	— (Note: Sketchy did not enter the UK Albums Chart, but peaked at number 91 on the UK Album Downloads Chart.)	36
Better Dreaming	Released: May 16, 2025; Label: 4AD	—	—	—	—	—	—	—	—	—	—

=== Soundtracks ===
List of soundtrack albums
Title	Details
Sorry to Bother You (original score)	Released: April 19, 2019; Label: 4AD
I Love Boosters (original score)	Released: May 22, 2026; Label: 4AD

=== EPs ===
- Bird-Droppings (November 3, 2009, 4AD, EAD2938) US-only download EP
- ...creep... Remixes (October 31, 2018, 4AD, 4AD0127DS) Download-only EP
- Tell the Future With Your Body (September 16, 2025, 4AD) Download-only EP

=== Singles ===
Title	Year	Peak chart positions					Album
Title	Year	US AAA	BEL (FL) Tip.	MEX Eng.	UK Phys.	UK Indie Break.	Album
"Sunlight" (Note: "Sunlight" was released as a promo-only CD-R)	2009	—	—	18	—	—	Bird-Brains
"Hatari" (Note: "Hatari" was released as a 7" vinyl and download)	2009	—	—	—	—	—	Bird-Brains
"Real Live Flesh"	2010	—	—	—	—	—	Bird-Brains
"Bizness"	2011	—	—	31	—	—	Whokill
"Gangsta"	2011	—	—	41	36	—	Whokill
"My Country"	2011	—	—	—	—	—	Whokill
"Water Fountain"	2014	—	—	37	—	19	Nikki Nack
"Hey Life"	2014	—	47	—	—	—	Nikki Nack
"Wait for a Minute"	2014	—	—	43	—	—	Nikki Nack
"Look at Your Hands"	2017	—	— (Note: "Look at Your Hands" did not enter the Ultratop Top 50, but spent 4 weeks as an extra tip on the Ultratop Bubbling Under chart.)	—	—	—	I Can Feel You Creep Into My Private Life
"ABC 123"	2017	—	—	—	—	—	I Can Feel You Creep Into My Private Life
"Heart Attack"	2018	—	— (Note: "Heart Attack" did not enter the Ultratop Top 50, but spent 4 weeks as an extra tip on the Ultratop Bubbling Under chart.)	—	—	—	I Can Feel You Creep Into My Private Life
"Nowhere, Man"	2020	—	—	—	—	—	Sketchy
"Hold Yourself."	2021	18	—	—	—	—	Sketchy
"Hypnotized"	2021	—	— (Note: "Hypnotized" did not enter the Ultratop Top 50, but spent 3 weeks as an extra tip on the Ultratop Bubbling Under chart.)	—	—	—	Sketchy
"Heartbreak"	2025	25	—	—	—	—	Better Dreaming
"—" denotes a recording that did not chart or was not released in that territory.

=== Music videos ===
- "Real Live Flesh" (2010)
- "Bizness" (2011)
- "Gangsta" (2011)
- "My Country" (2012)
- "Water Fountain" (2014)
- "Real Thing" (2014)
- "Wait For A Minute" (2015)
- "Rocking Chair" (2015)
- "Look At Your Hands" (2017)
- "ABC 123" (2017)
- "Heart Attack" (2018)
- "Honesty" (2018)
- "nowhere, man" (2020)
- "hold yourself" (2021)
- "hypnotized" (2021)
- "Limelight" (2025)
- "Heartbreak" (2025)
- "How Big Is The Rainbow" (2025)

=== Guest appearances ===
- Citay – "Mirror Kisses" from Dream Get Together (January 26, 2010, Dead Oceans)
- Afuche – "Danice Marino" from Highly Publicized Digital Boxing Match (May 21, 2011, Cuneiform Records)
- Elephant & Castle – "En Memoria" from Transitions (March 27, 2012, Plug Research)
- Preservation Hall Jazz Band – "Careless Love" from St. Peter & 57th St. (September 25, 2012, Rounder Records)
- The Blind Boys of Alabama – "I've Been Searching" from I'll Find a Way (October 1, 2013, Sony Masterworks)
- Battles (band) – "Last Supper On Shasta Pt 1 / Pt 2" from Juice B Crypts (October 16, 2019, Warp (record label))

=== Productions ===
- Thao & Mirah – Thao + Mirah (April 26, 2011, Kill Rock Stars)
- Latyrx – "Deliberate Jibberish" and "Watershed Moment" from The Second Album (November 5, 2013, Latyramid)
- Thao & the Get Down Stay Down – A Man Alive (March 4, 2016, Ribbon Music)
- Sonny & the Sunsets – Moods Baby Moods (May 27, 2016, Polyvinyl)

=== Compilation appearances ===
- "Powa" from 4AD Sessions 2008–2011 (September 20, 2011, 4AD)
- "Bizness" from Modern Songbirds: The Most Incredible Female Singers (April 20, 2012, EMI)
- "Bizness" from Studio Brussel Selected Live Sessions (April 21, 2012, Studio Brussel)
- "Lady" from Red Hot + Fela (June 1, 2012, Knitting Factory Records)
- "Riotriot" from Rough Trade Shops: Green Man '12 (July 30, 2012, Rough Trade Records)
