= The Black Dirt Sessions =

Studio album by Deer Tick
- Released: June 8, 2010
- Recorded: 2009
- Genre: Indie rock, alternative country
- Length: 46:36
- Label: Partisan Records

Deer Tick chronology
Born on Flag Day (2009)	The Black Dirt Sessions (2010)	Divine Providence (2011)

The Black Dirt Sessions is the third album by American indie-rock band Deer Tick. Recorded over a year earlier, the album was released on June 8, 2010 on Partisan Records.

== Track listing ==
All tracks are written by John McCauley.

No.	Title	Length
1.	"Choir of Angels"	2:55
2.	"Twenty Miles"	3:44
3.	"Goodbye, Dear Friend"	4:58
4.	"Piece by Piece and Frame by Frame"	4:09
5.	"Sad Sun"	4:34
6.	"Mange"	5:16
7.	"When She Comes Home"	3:53
8.	"Hand In My Hand"	4:31
9.	"I Will Not Be Myself"	3:22
10.	"Blood Moon"	4:41
11.	"Christ Jesus" (a new re-recorded version of the same track from War Elephant)	4:33

Professional ratings
Review scores
Source	Rating
FutureTunez	3/5 stars
musicOMH	2/5 stars
Robert Christgau	(1-star Honorable Mention)
Rockfeedback	4/5 stars
Slant Magazine	2.5/5 stars
SPIN Magazine	3.5/5 stars
