= The Suffers =

US musical group

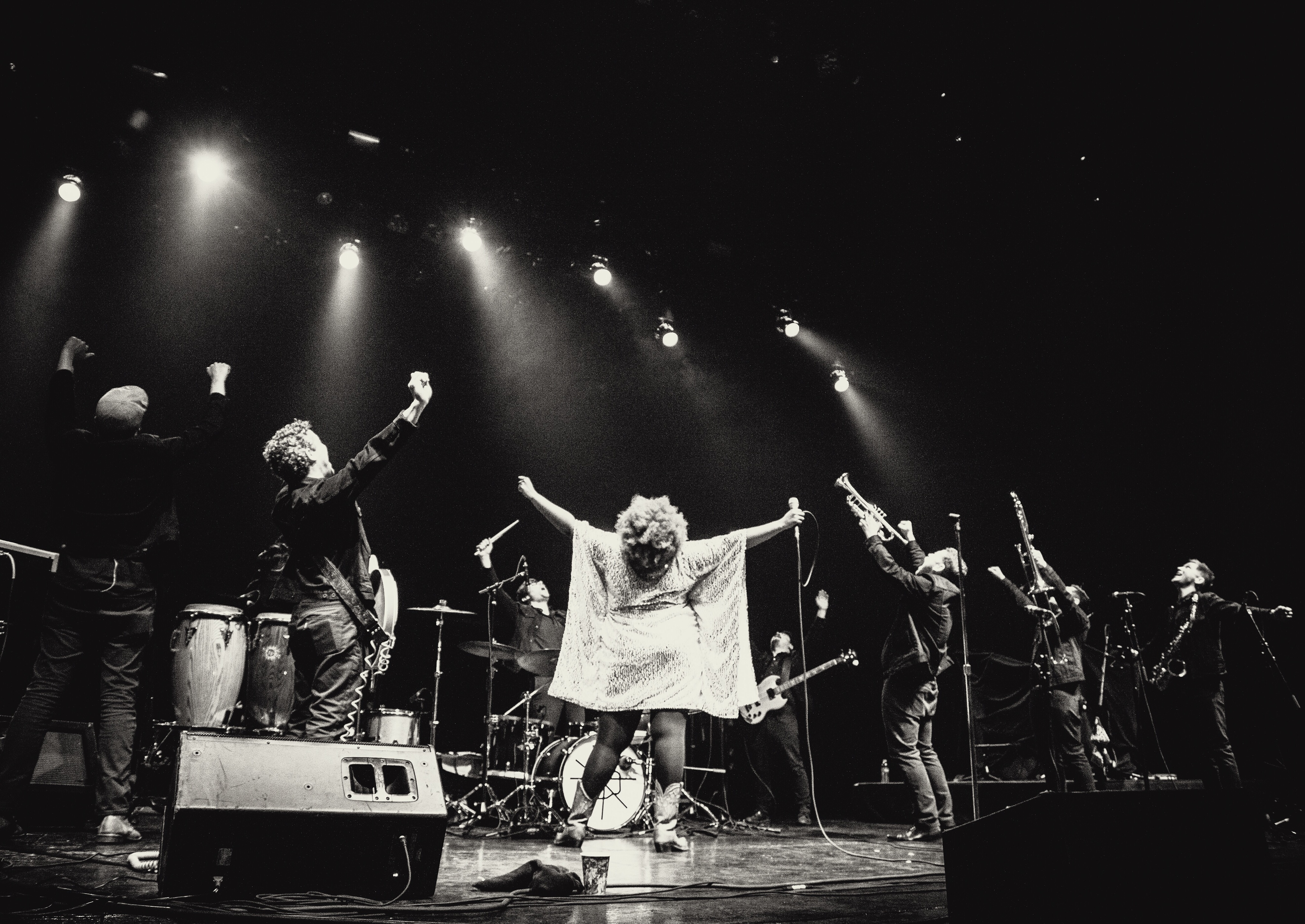
- The Suffers perform in Los Angeles, CA

Background information
- Origin: Houston, Texas, United States
- Genres: R&B, soul, smooth jazz
- Years active: 2011-present
- Members: Kam Franklin; Nick Zamora; Jon Durbin; Michael Razo; Jose Luna; Edmond Prevost Jr
- Past members: Alexis Zamora; Cory Wilson; Adam Castaneda; Patrick Kelly; Kevin Bernier; Juliet Terrill
- Website: thesuffersmusic.com

The Suffers are an American soul, funk, and R&B group from Houston, Texas. The band consists of Kam Franklin (lead vocals), Juliet Terrill (bass guitar), Kevin Bernier (guitar), Jon Durbin (trumpet), Michael Razo (trombone), Jose Luna (percussion), and Nick Zamora (drums). They were formed in 2011.

== Style ==
The Suffers define their sound as Gulf Coast Soul, a term they define as resulting from the mixture of the different cultures and musical styles present around the Gulf coast and the city of Houston, including Cajun, African American, Mexican, Caribbean, which all come together and mix in the port city. They have said that their biggest influence is their environment and all of the musical styles they encounter (blues, soul, country, caribbean music, cajun styles, and hip hop, among others).

== Biography ==
=== Origin ===
The Suffers formed in Houston in 2011, and was started by Adam Castaneda and Pat Kelly. The two had played together for some time in other bands before coming together for a new concept that would eventually become The Suffers. The band was originally envisioned as a Reggae cover band, but the group grew, adding various musicians and evolving in style.

Their name comes from the 1978 Jamaican film Rockers. During their February 9, 2016 appearance on The Daily Show with Trevor Noah, lead singer Kam Franklin stated "Its a reference to an old Jamaican film called The Rockers. And in that film, the artists are actually the sufferers. The major labels aren't doing what they could be doing to make sure they get their just deserved things. And you know, I feel like us as artists we've been working for so long with no real reward or attention probably until recently..."

Since 2011, the band has grown in popularity and has garnered international awards and recognition.

== Awards and recognition ==
In December 2015, Billboard listed The Suffers debut full-length album as one of "Top 10 Anticipated Rock & Alternative Albums"

In January 2015, BuzzFeed listed The Suffers as one of "25 New Artists You Need in Your Life in 2015".

The Suffers were an official performer at the 2015 South by Southwest music festival, and were featured by Esquire as one of the 40 bands to see at South by Southwest.

They are the recipients of 11 Houston Press Music Awards in 2015.

The Suffers have been covered by SPIN, The New York Times, and Paste.

== Tours and notable appearances ==
On October 18, 2014, The Suffers performed "Draped Up", "Big Pimpin", "Get Throwed" and "International Player's Anthem (I Choose You)" alongside Bun B at the Premium Goods 10th Anniversary party in Houston, TX. The Suffers performed at Big D NYE, the largest New Year's Eve celebration in the U.S. Central Time zone, on December 31, 2014.

In 2015, The Suffers played a west coast tour to start the year, before performing at South by Southwest. On March 30, 2015, the band performed on the Late Show with David Letterman. After the late night television appearance, The Suffers began an East Coast/Southern U.S. tour that lasted through the summer of 2015.

On October 27, 2015, The Suffers performed "Giver", "Midtown" & "Gwan" on NPR's Tiny Desk Concert for Bob Boilen

On November 14, 2015, The Suffers performed "Gwan" with The University of Houston Spirit of Houston Marching Band during the football halftime show.

In 2016, The Suffers toured with Galactic and Lake Street Dive.

On February 9, 2016, they appeared on The Daily Show with Trevor Noah, performing "Peanuts" & "Midtown".

On March 10, 2016, they appeared on Jimmy Kimmel Live, performing "Peanuts" & "Midtown"

On August 10, 2016 their song "Gwan" was a part of the soundtrack for Mr Robot Season 2 Episode 6.

In Fall of 2018, The Suffers replaced Julian Marley on a two month tour with Thievery Corporation.

In 2020, Brene Brown selected The Suffers' song, "Take Me To The Good Times", for her "Dare To Lead" Podcast on Spotify.

== Discography ==
=== EPs ===
- Slow it Down b/w Step Aside (2013)
- Make Some Room (2014)

=== LPs ===
- The Suffers (2016) Rhyme & Reason Records
- Everything Here (2018) Shanachie Records
- It Starts With Love (2022)

=== Singles ===
- Take Me To The Good Times (2020) Midcitizen Records
- How Do We Heal featuring Son Little and Bryce The Third (2022) Missing Piece Group Records
