= Veneer Magazine =

Art periodical

Veneer Magazine Issues 01-06/18

Veneer Magazine is a subscription-based art publication. The magazine is edited by Aaron Flint Jamison and published by MPH. Veneer is distributed domestically by Textfield. Printed annually both in print and published online, Issue 1 was released in 2007 and the final issue, Issue 18, will be available in 2025. Two versions of each printed issue are created, one for subscribers and one for retail outlets. The issues are produced in an edition of 1000 with 300 of that edition being reserved for subscribers and 700 available for retail. Subscriber's editions also contain additional materials.

Veneer has included contributions from contemporary artists, writers, inventors, technicians, and musicians such as Adrian Piper, George Kuchar, GoodiePal, Lucky Dragons, Elaine Sturtevant, Kevin Kelly and Ray Kurzweil.

Veneer is known to fetishize the materials and processes involved in each issue. Past methods have included printing on a variety of paper stocks with unique letterpress and offset techniques, bull-whipping of each individual issue, spray foam, embedding of titanium pieces, embedding of cubic zirconia, and application of Brut Deodorant and Chantilly Lace perfume.
