= Nikki Nack =

Studio album by Tune-Yards
- Released: May 5, 2014
- Genre: Art pop, worldbeat, dance, technopop, experimental
- Length: 44:18
- Label: 4AD
- Producer: Merrill Garbus, John Hill, Malay

Tune-Yards chronology
| Whokill (2011) | Nikki Nack (2014) | I Can Feel You Creep Into My Private Life (2018) |

Singles from Tune-Yards
- 1. "Water Fountain" Released: March 18, 2014; 2. "Wait for a Minute" Released: April 8, 2014; 3. "Rocking Chair" Released: August 6, 2015

Nikki Nack is the third album by American band Tune-Yards, released by 4AD in May 2014.

On March 3, 2014, singer Merril Garbus posted a two-and-a-half-minute megamix of tracks from the album on her website, thanking fans for "your support and patience while we cooked this chicken." A subsequent tour was announced, including a batch of international tour dates and a few festivals. The album features work with record producers John Hill and Malay.

On March 18, 2014, Garbus released the first album single, "Water Fountain".

On April 25, 2014, NPR began streaming the album as part of its First Listen series.

== Background and recording ==
In early 2013, Garbus took a trip to Haiti to work on the follow-up to her 2011 release Whokill.

The album features contributions from the a cappella singing group Roomful of Teeth.

== Touring ==
On April 23, Garbus embarked on a tour supporting Arcade Fire in North America, before her own headline shows across Europe and North America, joined by a full touring band. Band members for the Nikki Nack tour were Merrill Garbus (drums, vocals, keys, ukulele), Nate Brenner (bass, synths, vocals), Haley Dekle (percussion, vocals), Jo Lampert (vocals), Dani Markham (percussion, vocals), and Abigail Nessen-Bengson (vocals).

== Promotion ==
A music video directed by Joel Kefali was released on April 23, 2014, for "Water Fountain". Garbus also appeared on the podcast Comedy Bang! Bang! alongside comedians Jenny Slate and Jon Daly in June 2014 to promote the album. On August 6, 2015, a video created by Sarah Pupo for the song "Rocking Chair" was released.

The single, "Water Fountain" featured as soundtrack in the EA Sports game, FIFA 15, along with the eight season finale of Shameless

== Critical reception ==
Professional ratings
Aggregate scores
| Source | Rating |
|---|---|
| AnyDecentMusic? | 8.0/10 |
| Metacritic | 83/100 |
Review scores
| Source | Rating |
| AllMusic | 4.5/5 stars |
| The A.V. Club | A− |
| Cuepoint (Expert Witness) | A− |
| Entertainment Weekly | B+ |
| The Guardian | 4/5 stars |
| NME | 8/10 |
| Pitchfork | 8.1/10 |
| Q | 4/5 stars |
| Rolling Stone | 4/5 stars |
| Spin | 9/10 |

At Metacritic, which assigns a normalized rating out of 100 to reviews from music critics, Nikki Nack received an average score of 83, which indicates "universal acclaim", based on 34 reviews. Cian Taylor of NME described the album as pairing "non-western musical traditions with melodies fit for a playground" while combining "layers of fizzing electronics and rapid-fire wordplay" and stated that at its best, it is "easily Tune-Yards' finest work." Barry Walters of Spin stated that "Nikki Nack betters Whokill by beefing up its feral ferocity with more sophisticated chops" and, in particular, complimented the power of "Garbus's magnificent yelp." At Alternative Press, Jeff Rosenstock remarked on how "Nikki Nack pinballs between tidy arrangements and full-blown maximalism to find catchy melodies and dance beats in the strangest places." Rolling Stone's Will Hermes stated that the album suggests that Garbus is "an innovator in it for the long haul."

== Track listing ==
| No. | Title | Writer(s) | Length |
|---|---|---|---|
| 1. | "Find a New Way" | Brenner, Garbus | 3:28 |
| 2. | "Water Fountain" | Brenner, Garbus | 3:04 |
| 3. | "Time of Dark" | Brenner, Garbus | 4:33 |
| 4. | "Real Thing" | Brenner, Garbus | 3:22 |
| 5. | "Look Around" | Brenner, Garbus | 4:26 |
| 6. | "Hey Life" | Brenner, Garbus | 3:37 |
| 7. | "Sink-O" | Brenner, Garbus | 3:17 |
| 8. | "Why Do We Dine on the Tots?" | Garbus | 1:28 |
| 9. | "Stop That Man" | Brenner, Garbus | 3:33 |
| 10. | "Wait for a Minute" | Brenner, Garbus | 3:54 |
| 11. | "Left Behind" | Brenner, Garbus | 4:31 |
| 12. | "Rocking Chair" | Garbus | 2:03 |
| 13. | "Manchild" | Brenner, Garbus | 3:09 |
| Total length: | | | 44:18 |

== Charts ==
| Chart (2014) | Peak position |
|---|---|
| Belgian Albums (Ultratop Flanders) | 51 |
| Belgian Albums (Ultratop Wallonia) | 152 |
| Scottish Albums (OCC) | 90 |
| UK Albums (OCC) | 57 |
| UK Independent Albums (OCC) | 11 |
| US Billboard 200 | 27 |
| US Independent Albums (Billboard) | 4 |
| US Top Rock Albums (Billboard) | 8 |
