= Mayonnaise (Deer Tick album) =

Compilation album by Deer Tick
- Released: February 1, 2019
- Length: 48:38
- Label: Partisan

Deer Tick chronology
Deer Tick, Vol. 2 (2017)	Mayonnaise (2019)	Live at Fort Adams (2021)

Professional ratings
Aggregate scores
Source	Rating
Metacritic	67/100
Review scores
Source	Rating
AllMusic	3/5 stars
Blurt	4/5 stars
The Skinny	4/5 stars

Mayonnaise is a compilation album by American band Deer Tick. It was released on February 1, 2019 through Partisan Records.

== Track listing ==
No.	Title	Length
1.	"Bluesboy"	4:10
2.	"Limp Right Back"	4:32
3.	"White City" (Original cover by Shane MacGowan)	2:30
4.	"Old Lady"	3:46
5.	"Run of the Mill" (Original cover by George Harrison)	2:44
6.	"Strange, Awful Feeling"	2:35
7.	"End of the World"	3:07
8.	"Hey! Yeah!"	4:14
9.	"Pale Blue Eyes" (Original cover by Lou Reed)	7:03
10.	"Memphis Chair"	2:14
11.	"Too Sensitive for This World" (Original cover by Ben Vaughn)	4:59
12.	"Doomed From the Start"	2:38
13.	"Cocktail"	4:06

== Charts and Reception ==
Chart	Peak position
UK Americana Albums (OCC)	33
US Independent Albums (Billboard)	31
