= Divine Providence (album) =

Studio album by Deer Tick
- Released: October 24, 2011
- Recorded: 2011
- Genres: Indie rock, alternative country
- Length: 47:36
- Label: Partisan Records

Deer Tick chronology
| The Black Dirt Sessions (2010) | Divine Providence (2011) | Negativity (2013) |

Divine Providence is the fourth album by American indie-rock band Deer Tick.

== Production ==
The album was produced by Cosmic Thug production duo Adam Landry and Justin Collins, the album was the first to feature the current lineup of the band and displayed a louder and faster sound than previous releases, with the band aiming to capture “the raw and spontaneous kerosene blaze”.

== Release ==
Divine Providence was released on October 24, 2011 on Partisan Records in the US and April 2, 2012 on Loose Music in the UK and Europe.

== Track listing ==
All tracks are written by John McCauley except as noted.

| No. | Title | Writer(s) | Length |
|---|---|---|---|
| 1. | "The Bump" | | 3:28 |
| 2. | "Funny Word" | | 4:50 |
| 3. | "Let's All Go to the Bar" | John McCauley, Ian O'Neil, Rob Crowell | 3:18 |
| 4. | "Clownin Around" | Dennis Ryan | 4:25 |
| 5. | "Main Street" | | 3:48 |
| 6. | "Chevy Express" | | 3:45 |
| 7. | "Something to Brag About" | | 2:18 |
| 8. | "Walkin Out the Door" | Ian O'Neil, Jonny Corndawg | 3:38 |
| 9. | "Make Believe" | | 3:26 |
| 10. | "Now It's Your Turn" | Ian O'Neil | 4:30 |
| 11. | "Electric" | | 4:15 |
| 12. | "Miss K." (Miss K. ends at 3:18 and an unlisted cover of Paul Westerberg's Mr Cigarette begins at 33:37) | | 36.12 |

Professional ratings
Review scores
| Source | Rating |
|---|---|
| Consequence of Sound | C+ |
| Drowned in Sound | 7/10 |
| Paste | 8.0/10 |
| Robert Christgau | A− |
| Rolling Stone | 3.5/5 stars |
| Spin | 8/10 stars |
| Uncut | 8/10 stars |
