= Emotional Contracts =

Studio album by Deer Tick
- Released: June 16, 2023
- Recorded: June 15, 2022 – September 2022 (Tarbox sessions only)
- Studio: Big Orange Sheep, Brooklyn, New York City, New York, United States; Electric Delux Studio, Austin, Texas, United States; Tarbox Road Studios, Cassadaga, New York, United States
- Genre: Americana; indie rock; roots rock
- Length: 40:05
- Language: English
- Label: ATO
- Producer: David Fridmann

Deer Tick chronology
Live at Fort Adams (2021)	Emotional Contracts (2023)

Professional ratings
Aggregate scores
Source	Rating
Metacritic	75/100
Review scores
Source	Rating
Spill Magazine	9.0/10
Americana UK	8/10
Glide Magazine	Positive
Seven Days	Positive

Emotional Contracts is a 2023 studio album by American indie rock band Deer Tick, released on ATO Records.

== Reception ==
According to the review aggregator Metacritic, Emotional Contracts received "generally favorable reviews" based on a weighted average score of 75 out of 100 from five critic scores. Editors at AllMusic rated this album 3 out of 5 stars, with critic Fred Thomas writing this album "finds Deer Tick operating at full power and making very few advancements from previous albums, seeing no need to fix what isn't broken with their meat-and-potatoes, blue-collar rock sound". In Glide Magazine, Shawn Donohue writes that this album sounds similar to The Band and Los Lobos without being retro and states that "there is a lot to like" on this release. At The Spill Magazine, the editors chose this as a pick and critic Tony Stuart rated it a 9 out of 10 for being "gloriously retro, but still looking forward" and writing that the "songs on the release all showcase different facets of the band, but the one consistent thread is that this is a very tight, well-rehearsed outfit".

Uncut ranked this the 62nd best album of 2023.

== Track listing ==
All songs written by John McCauley, except where noted.

1. "If I Try to Leave" – 3:37
2. "Forgiving Ties" (Ian O'Neil and Dennis Michael Ryan) – 4:10
3. "Grey Matter" – 2:59
4. "If She Could Only See Me Now" – 2:51
5. "Running from Love" – 4:27
6. "Once in a Lifetime" – 4:42
7. "Disgrace (O'Neil and Julian Veronesi) – 2:54
8. "My Ship" – 2:19
9. "A Light Can Go Out in the Heart" (O'Neil) – 3:07
10. "The Real Thing" – 8:59

== Personnel ==
Deer Tick

- John Joseph McCauley – lead vocals, guitar
- Ian Patrick O'Neil – guitar, backing vocals
- Christopher Dale Ryan – bass guitar, backing vocals
- Dennis Michael Ryan – drums, backing vocals

Additional personnel

- Courtney Marie Andrews – vocals
- John Baldwin – mastering
- Steve Berlin – baritone saxophone, tenor saxophone
- Vanessa Carlton – vocals
- Joshua Carrigan – inside photography
- Jake Charkey – cello
- Robbie Crowell – tenor saxophone
- Kam Franklin – backing vocals on "Once in a Lifetime"
- David Fridmann – synthesizer, programming, engineering, mixing, production
- Jon Fridmann – flute, French horn, glockenspiel, trombone, trumpet, horn arrangement, engineering
- Michael Fridmann – engineering
- Lois Harada – cover typeset
- Dana Lyn – viola
- Maurisa Mackey – band photography
- Angela Miller – vocals
- Nate Moretti – drawing
- Steve Poltz – vocals
- Sheree Smith – vocals
- Skye Steele – string arrangements, violin

== See also ==
- List of 2023 albums
