= Whokill =

Studio album by Tune-Yards
- Released: April 19, 2011
- Genres: Art pop, noise pop, avant-pop
- Length: 42:12
- Label: 4AD

Tune-Yards chronology
Bird-Brains (2009)	Whokill (2011)	Nikki Nack (2014)

Whokill (stylized as w h o k i l l) is the second full-length release by Merrill Garbus' project Tune-Yards. It was released on 4AD Records on April 19, 2011.

It was the number one album of 2011 on The Village Voice's annual Pazz and Jop critic's poll The album was recognized as one of "The 100 Best Albums of the Decade So Far" by Pitchfork in August 2014.

== Musical style ==
The album covers a "formidable range of genres and styles" including acoustic folk, rock, R&B, punk rock, funk, free jazz and Afrobeat. As on her first album, Bird-Brains, Whokill relies on heavily layering looped sounds – notably vocals, drums and ukulele – which multi-instrumentalist/vocalist/composer Garbus uses to create her sound.

Unlike the lo-fi Bird-Brains, which was self-recorded on a handheld voice recorder, Whokill was recorded in studio, resulting in a fuller and clearer sound. It was produced by Garbus and engineered by Eli Crews at New, Improved Studios in Oakland, California. Tune-Yards also fleshed out the line-up to reflect the live shows, adding bass player Nate Brenner, who co-wrote some of the album's songs, and using horns on several tracks.

== Themes ==
Thematically, Whokill is concerned with "power struggles that arise from inequity and lead to further cruelty and injustice," rooted in issues of privilege around race, gender and class. The album opens with "My Country," "a love-hate anthem" about America, which subverts the patriotic song "My Country, 'Tis of Thee."

The lyrics of Whokill are concerned with violence in different forms, including police brutality ("Doorstep", "Riotriot"), neighborhood violence ("Gangsta"), and more figurative forms of violence, as on "Powa," where Garbus tells a mirror, "you bomb me with life's humiliations every day / you bomb me so many times I never find my way." Garbus is both repelled and fascinated by violence: in "Riotriot," Garbus secretly fantasizes about the police officer who arrests her brother, before announcing "there is a freedom in violence that I don't understand / and like I've never felt before"; and on the final track, "Killa," Garbus declares, "All my violence is here in the sound."

Garbus changed the album's original working title (Women Who Kill) to its final released version as an expression of modern dissonance. The irregular spelling and spacing represents, in her words, "what we get from texting and e-mailing all the time, when nothing is ever exactly right."

== Reception ==
Professional ratings
Aggregate scores
Source	Rating
AnyDecentMusic?	8.3/10
Metacritic	86/100
Review scores
Source	Rating
AllMusic	4/5 stars
The A.V. Club	B+
Chicago Tribune	3.5/4 stars
The Guardian	4/5 stars
MSN Music (Expert Witness)	A
NME	8/10
Pitchfork	8.8/10
Q	4/5 stars
Rolling Stone	3.5/5 stars
Spin	8/10

Upon release, the album was met with critical acclaim and very positive reviews. It holds a current score of 86/100 on review-aggregator Metacritic, indicating "universal acclaim," and was ranked as the number four album of 2011 on Metacritic's Music Critics Top 10 Lists. It was ranked as the number one album of 2011 on The Village Voice's annual Pazz and Jop critic's poll, showing up on 135 top ten lists, making it likely the lowest-selling and lowest-charting winner in the poll's history.

Uncut placed it at number 44 on its list of the "Top 50 Albums of 2011". Pitchfork put it as number 7 on its Top 50 while Mojo placed the album at number 45.

The song "Gangsta" was featured in the TV shows Weeds, Orange is the New Black, Letterkenny, and The Good Wife.

As of January 2012 UK sales stand at 8,000 copies according to The Guardian.

== Track listing ==
All tracks are written by Merrill Garbus, except where noted.

No.	Title	Writer(s)	Length
1.	"My Country"		3:40
2.	"Es-So"		3:29
3.	"Gangsta"	Nate Brenner; Garbus	3:58
4.	"Powa"		5:03
5.	"Riotriot"		4:13
6.	"Bizness"	Brenner; Garbus	4:23
7.	"Doorstep"		4:16
8.	"You Yes You"	Brenner; Garbus	3:33
9.	"Wooly Wolly Gong"		6:06
10.	"Killa"	Brenner; Garbus	3:12
Total length:			42:12

== Charts ==
Chart (2011)	Peak position
Belgian Albums (Ultratop Flanders)	49
Belgian Alternative Albums (Ultratop Flanders)	21
Irish Albums (IRMA)	55
UK Albums (Official Charts)	135
UK Independent Albums (Official Charts)	17
US Billboard 200	148
US Heatseekers Albums (Billboard)	8
US Independent Albums (Billboard)	26
US Top Rock Albums (Billboard)	37
