= Viking Moses =

American band

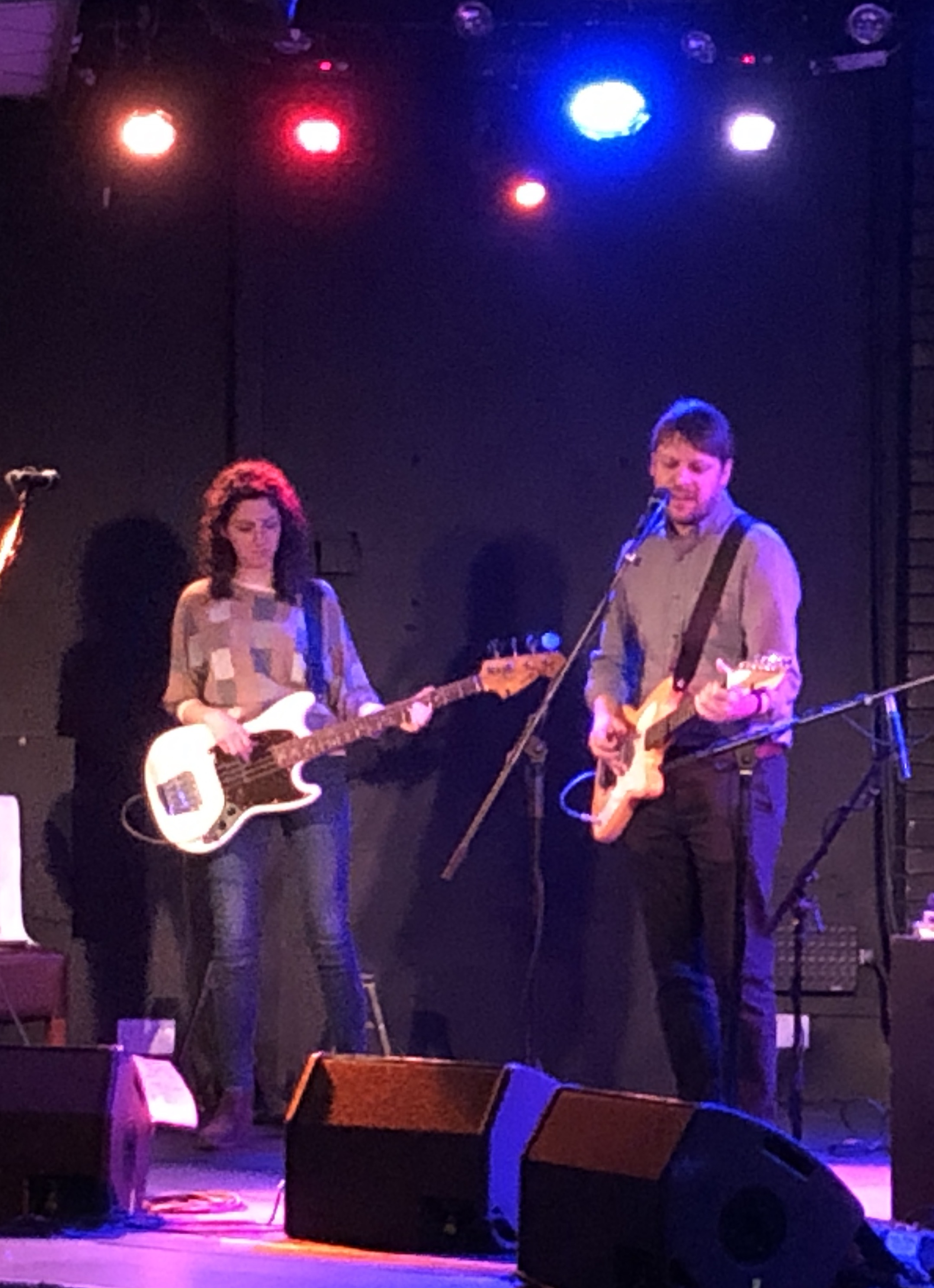
- Viking Moses performing at Brudenell Social Club, Leeds, UK in 2019

Background information
- Genres: rock, soul
- Years active: 2003–present
- Labels: Marriage Records, Poptones
- Members: Brendon Massei, Spencer Kingman, Jacob Soto
- Website: VikingMoses.com

Viking Moses (or The Viking Moses!) is a band fronted by Brendon Massei, an American songwriter noted for being on tour since 1993. Founded in 2003 and currently based in Baltimore, the group features a rotating cast of musicians. Viking Moses has worked with the Alan McGee's Poptones record label as well as Portland-based Marriage Records.

== History ==
Brendon Massei began touring regularly around 1993, first under his own name, then under the moniker Supperbell Roundup, before finally settling on Viking Moses in 2003. In the style of rock/soul, Viking Moses became known in 2004, thanks to Devendra Banhart's Golden Apples of the Sun compilation and good words, followed by a signing by Alan McGee (Creation Records founder, manager of Oasis and Mogwai).

Viking Moses has toured with Scout Niblett, Phosphorescent, Little Wings, and The Shivers. Massei is also known for bringing musicians including Deer Tick's John McCauley, Mike Sherk of Mandarin Dynasty, Nat Baldwin of the Dirty Projectors and Jana Hunter on their first tours. He has supported James Yorkston in the UK on several tours.

Massei was close with Jason Molina of Songs: Ohia and Magnolia Electric Co. fame; following Molina's death, Massei wrote about their friendship in an article for Common Folk Music, and contributed to a covers album benefitting the late singer's family, titled The Static and the Distance.

=== In film ===
Massei's tour warrior antics have drawn him attention, including a 2011 feature-length documentary by Pulse Films titled Werewolves Across America about his life and lifestyle as a touring musician.

In 2012, the song "Dancing by the Water Day", from the 2006 release Crosses was featured in the film Kelly + Victor.

== Discography ==
=== Albums ===
- Crosses (2006)
- The Parts that Showed (2009)
- The Conquest Night (2012)
- Jahiliyah (2014)
- Cruel Child (2019)

=== Single ===
- Werewolves in The City (2006) (cover of Tv! Tv! Happy/Werewolves In The City by the band Quem Quaeritis writing by John Thill on the LP)
