= Negativity (album) =

Studio album by Deer Tick
- Released: September 24, 2013
- Recorded: 2013
- Genres: Indie rock, alternative country
- Length: 48:14
- Label: Partisan Records
- Producer: Steve Berlin

Deer Tick chronology
Divine Providence (2011)	Negativity (2013)	Deer Tick Vol. 1 (2017)

Negativity is the fifth album by American indie-rock band Deer Tick. The album was recorded in Portland, Oregon with Los Lobos' Steve Berlin. Writing began in 2012 during a challenging time in John McCauley's personal life. Album artwork photography by Anna Webber. It is the band's first release on Canadian record label Arts & Crafts.

== Reception ==
Professional ratings
Review scores
Source	Rating
Allmusic	link
Consequence of Sound	3.5/5 stars
Paste	7.2 stars on a 10 point scale
Inyourspeakers	7/10 stars

The album received a generally positive reception from critics. Louder Than War called the album "a wonderfully satisfying collection of songs."

Rolling Stone reviewed the album favorably, calling the album's songs "tight" and an opportunity for McCauley to flex their roots.

== Track listing ==
All tracks are written by John McCauley except where noted.

No.	Title	Length
1.	"The Rock"	4:14
2.	"The Curtain"	3:36
3.	"Just Friends"	3:02
4.	"The Dream's In The Ditch" (Ian Patrick O'Neil)	3:12
5.	"Mirror Walls"	4:52
6.	"Mr. Sticks"	4:46
7.	"Trash"	4:25
8.	"Thyme" (Dennis Michael Ryan)	3:39
9.	"In Our Time" (Ft: Vanessa Carlton)	4:18
10.	"Hey Doll"	3:08
11.	"Pot of Gold"	5:40
12.	"Big House"	3:26
