= Sketchy (album) =

Studio album by Tune-Yards
- Released: March 26, 2021
- Recorded: 2019
- Length: 37:01
- Label: 4AD

Tune-Yards chronology
I Can Feel You Creep Into My Private Life (2018)	Sketchy (2021)

Singles from Sketchy
- 1. "Nowhere, Man" Released: September 22, 2020; 2. "Hold Yourself" Released: January 27, 2021; 3. "Hypnotized" Released: March 23, 2021

Sketchy (stylized as sketchy.) is the fifth studio album by American indie pop band Tune-Yards. It was released on March 26, 2021, through 4AD.

== Background ==
Writing for the album began in 2019, in the band's own studio in Oakland, California.

== Release and promotion ==
Tune-Yards announced on January 27, 2021 they were releasing their fifth studio album on March 26, 2021.

=== Singles ===
On September 22, 2020, Tune-Yards released "Nowhere, Man", the first single in two years. The single is a reference to The Beatles' 1965 song Nowhere Man. Lead vocalist Merrill Garbus said of the single: "The song and the video for "nowhere, man" were created under conditions of feeling squeezed and pushed to the brink - relatively, of course. I wanted to ask, "How loudly do I have to shout and sing before I'm heard?" And the video asks, too, "What am I not hearing?" We hope the music brings energy and a strong wind of encouragement to those who are shouting and singing loudly for justice right now."

The second single "Hold Yourself" was released on January 27, 2021. In a statement, the band said: "This song is about feeling really betrayed, by my parents' generation, and at the same time, really seeing how we are betraying the future". The band performed the single on The Late Show with Stephen Colbert on February 22, 2021.

On March 18, 2021, Tune-Yards performed the single "Hypnotized" on Jimmy Kimmel Live!. A week later, on March 23, 2021, the band released the single.

=== Music videos ===
The band released the music video to "Nowhere, man" on their official YouTube on the same day as the single release. The video is a stop motion animation, created by Japhy Riddle and Callie Day.

The music video for "Hold Yourself" was directed by Basa Studios, and released January 28, 2021.

== Critical reception ==
Professional ratings
Aggregate scores
Source	Rating
Metacritic	82/100
Review scores
Source	Rating
AllMusic	4/5 stars
DIY	4/5 stars
Exclaim!	7/10
The Line of Best Fit	8/10
Loud and Quiet	7/10
MusicOMH	3.5/5 stars
NME	4/5 stars
Paste	7.5/10
The Skinny	4/5 stars
Tom Hull – on the Web	B

Sketchy was met with "universal acclaim" from critics. At Metacritic, which assigns a weighted average rating out of 100 to reviews from mainstream publications, this release received an average score of 82 based on 11 reviews.

Writing for The Skinny, Cheri Armour wrote: "sketchy. finds the band stepping away from the digital screens and reaching for live instruments instead. It's evident in tracks like make it right. with its skronking jazz horns, and homewrecker’s tight-stacked, snare raps." At Loud and Quiet, Cheri Armour admired the "bright melodies and playful rhythms" of the songs, while going on to say "Tune-Yards make songs about self-doubt sound so curiously stirring." Heather Phares of AllMusic review the album, noting: "The duo's fifth full-length is about having the bravery and strength to confront old beliefs and old fears on a personal and global scale. It's not new territory for tUnE-yArDs, but it bears repeating, especially since the late 2010s and early 2020s brought the issues they railed against years earlier to a head. tUnE-yArDs haven't sounded this infectious since Nikki Nack, and Sketchy. captures the inflection point where frustration becomes positive action in funky, happy, angry, and inspiring ways."

In a review for Exclaim!, Rhys Juergensen gave a seven out of 10 rating, explaining: "sketchy., the project's fifth studio record, takes listeners to a world where spacy trap and glitchy alt-rock play host to a wide array of topical subject matter. Though sketchy. weighs in on a number of issues that are particularly pertinent in today's milieu, it doesn't compromise the album's sincerity. The record's explicit, prose-style lyrics manage to convey strong levels of intimacy precisely because Garbus says what she means, and means what she says."

== Track listing ==
Sketchy track listing
No.	Title	Length
1.	"Nowhere, Man"	3:29
2.	"Make It Right."	2:56
3.	"Hypnotized"	4:30
4.	"Homewrecker"	3:17
5.	"Silence Pt. 1 (When We Say "We")"	3:25
6.	"Silence Pt. 2 (Who Is "We"?)"	1:00
7.	"Hold Yourself."	4:50
8.	"Sometime"	2:53
9.	"Under Your Lip"	2:49
10.	"My Neighbor"	3:26
11.	"Be Not Afraid."	4:26
Total length:		37:01

Japanese edition (bonus track)
No.	Title	Length
12.	"Green Dreams (Hold On)"

Note

- All track titles are stylized in lowercase.
