= A Tribute to the King of Zydeco =

2025 compilation album by various artists

Compilation album by Various artists
- Released: June 27, 2025
- Label: Valcour
- Producer: Joel Savoy; Steve Berlin

Singles from A Tribute to the King of Zydeco
- 1. "Zydeco Sont Pas Salés" Released: June 25, 2025; 2. "Hey, 'Tite Fille" Released: May 30, 2025; 3. "Release Me" Released: April 24, 2025

A Tribute to the King of Zydeco is a tribute compilation album by various artists, released on June 27, 2025, via Valcour Records and Sony Music Publishing. The "King of Zydeco" celebrated in the album title is Clifton Chenier, using a frequent nickname for the musician. The album won Best Regional Roots Music Album in the 2025 Grammy Awards.

== Description ==
The album was recorded primarily at Dockside Studio in Maurice, Louisiana, in January 2024, although many contributions, especially vocals, were recorded in studios in other cities across the world. The album was produced by Joel Savoy and Steve Berlin, with C. C. Adcock producing "Zydeco Sont Pas Salé" and "Release Me."

The album features several Louisiana and Texas accordionists—C.J. Chenier, Geno Delafose, Anthony Dopsie, Keith Frank, Steve Riley, Curley Taylor, and Nathan Williams Sr.—and washboard player Sherelle Chenier Mouton. Sherelle Chenier Mouton is Clifton Chenier's grand-niece, and C.J. Chenier is his son. Vocals, guitar, and other instruments are provided by a broad variety of musicians from the genres of Blues, Bluegrass, Americana, Rock, and Tex-Mex.

The album's release occurred two days after what would have been Clifton Chenier's 100th birthday and as part of a broader "Year of Chenier" celebrating the artist. Related events celebrating Chenier's centennial included a performance by the album's Dockside Allstars at the 2025 New Orleans Jazz & Heritage Festival, a party at the New Orleans Jazz Museum, events throughout South Louisiana and in Washington, D.C., and a box-set compilation album of Chenier recordings released by Smithsonian Folkways and Arhoolie Records titled Clifton Chenier: King of Louisiana Blues and Zydeco.

The album cover features a photograph of Chenier taken by Richard "Dickie" Landry at Jay's Lounge & Cockpit near Cankton, Louisiana in 1972. Landry is also a saxophonist who played with Chenier and appears on the album.

Profits from the album's sales are donated to the newly established Clifton Chenier Memorial Scholarship Fund for studying zydeco accordion at the University of Louisiana at Lafayette.

== Singles ==
On April 24, 2025, "Release Me" was released as a digital single. The track featured Lucinda Williams and Tommy McLain on vocals, Keith Frank on accordion, Steve Riley on fiddle, Steve Berlin on baritone saxophone, and Tom Monger (as Tom Moth) on harp.

On June 25, 2025—the one hundredth anniversary of Chenier's birth—Valcour co-released with Smithsonian Folkways and Arhoolie Records a vinyl and digital single of the album's first track, "Zydeco Sont Pas Salé." The B side featured Chenier's original 1965 recording of the song.

== Reception ==
Professional ratings
Review scores
Source	Rating
Spill	4.5/5 stars
Stereophile	Performance; Sonics

Ljubinko Zivkovic of Spill Magazine wrote, "Not only has [Valcour Records] gathered an absolutely stellar cast here ... no frills, a lot of thrills without any experimental excursions, after all, Chenier’s music was a combination of so many things that it was experimental in all the right ways itself." Garth Cartwright of The Guardian noted, "['Zydeco Sont Pas Salé'] might just be the loosest, rawest [Rolling] Stones recording since Exile on Main St," but also that "the cream of Louisiana’s zydeco and Cajun musicians accompany the famous guests." Likewise, John Wirt of OffBeat Magazine noted, "Louisiana musicians form the tribute album’s backbone, blending Bayou State flavors with the national acts' interpretations of Chenier's repertoire." Writing for SPIN magazine, Steve Hochman opined, "Played by the Stones, ['Zydeco Sont Pas Salé' is] a red-hot rocker, arguably as smoking as anything the band has done in years. Maybe more so. It makes for a bracing opener to the album, setting the tone for a largely fierce, raw set of blues. Even the several ballads are raw and rough in the best ways. ... From there [the album is] a fiery run through blues, swamp-boogie, and jump-jive, with a handful of ballads for changes of pace. It manages to stay true to the honoree, without anyone imitating him."

David Browne of Rolling Stone connected the album's release with a broader cultural moment: "Interest in Americana [music] is on the rise, and the soundtrack for Sinners, the hit horror film set in the blues-drenched Mississippi of the Thirties, blends in blues and old-timey songs alongside modern hip-hop."

== Awards ==
A Tribute to the King of Zydeco won the Grammy for Best Regional Roots Music Album at the 2026 Grammy Awards.

== Track listing ==
A Tribute to the King of Zydeco track listing
No.	Title	Artists	Length
1.	"Zydeco Sont Pas Salé"	The Rolling Stones, Steve Riley	2:45
2.	"Easy Easy Baby"	Charley Crockett, Nathan Williams, Sr.	4:00
3.	"Hey 'Tite Fille"	Taj Mahal, Keith Frank	3:57
4.	"Release Me"	Lucinda Williams, Tommy McLain, Keith Frank	3:55
5.	"Just Like a Woman"	Steve Earle, Anthony Dopsie	3:51
6.	"I'm on the Wonder"	Jon Cleary, Curley Taylor	3:48
7.	"Why Did You Go Last Night"	Kam Franklin, A.J. Haynes, Roddie Romero	3:21
8.	"Hot Rod"	David Hidalgo, C.J. Chenier	3:22
9.	"Tout le Temps en Temps"	Shannon McNally, Keith Frank, Molly Tuttle	3:59
10.	"My Soul"	Jimmie Vaughan, Johnny Nicholas, Steve Riley	4:11
11.	"You Used to Call Me"	John Hiatt, Roddie Romero	3:54
12.	"Ay Ai Ai"	Ruben Ramos, Los Texmaniacs, Augie Meyers	3:00
13.	"I May Be Wrong"	Marcia Ball, Geno Delafose	3:53
14.	"I'm Coming Home"	C.J. Chenier, Sonny Landreth	5:13
Total length:			53:15

== Personnel ==
Credits adapted from the album's liner notes.

=== Musicians ===
- C. C. Adcock – backing vocals, guitar
- Eric Adcock – piano, electric organ, backing vocals
- Marcia Ball – vocals, piano
- Steve Berlin – baritone saxophone, clavinet
- Russ Broussard – backing vocals
- C.J. Chenier – accordion
- Jon Cleary – vocals, piano, electric guitar, electric organ
- Charley Crockett – vocals
- Geno Delafose – accordion
- Anthony Dopsie – accordion
- Steve Earle – vocals
- Paul "Bird" Edwards – washboard, backing vocals
- Keith Frank – accordion, vocals
- Kam Franklin – vocals
- Nigel Hall – backing vocals
- A.J. Haynes – vocals
- John Hiatt
- David Hidalgo – electric guitar
- David Hidalgo Jr. – drums
- Derek Huston – tenor saxophone, baritone saxophone, backing vocals
- Kelli Jones – backing vocals
- Tif Lamson – backing vocals
- Sonny Landreth – electric guitar
- Tommy McLain – vocals, piano
- Shannon McNally – vocals
- Augie Meyers – electric organ
- Tom Moth – harp
- Sherelle Chenier Mouton – washboard
- Johnny Nicholas – vocals, harmonica
- Ivan Neville – backing vocals
- Jermaine Prejean – drums
- Ruben Ramos – vocals
- Zachary Richard – backing vocals
- Steve Riley – accordion, fiddle
- Chris Rivera – drums
- The Rolling Stones
  - Mick Jagger – vocals, harmonica
  - Keith Richards – guitar
  - Ronnie Wood – guitar
- Roddie Romero – electric guitar, backing vocals
- Robert St. Julien – drums
- Taj Mahal – vocals
- Curley Taylor – accordion, washboard
- Los Texmaniacs
  - Josh Baca – accordion
  - Max Baca – bajo sexto
  - Noel Hernandez – bass
- Molly Tuttle – acoustic guitar
- Jimmie Vaughan – electric guitar
- Lucinda Williams – vocals
- Nathan Williams Sr. – accordion
- Lee Allen Zeno – bass

=== Additional contributors ===
- Megan Barra – artwork
- Justin Tocket – engineering
- Ian Sutherlin – engineering assistance
- Herman Fuselier – liner notes
- Dave McNair – mastering
- David Simon-Baker – mixing
- Jo Vidrine – photography
- Richard Landry – cover photography
- Joel Savoy – production
- Steve Berlin – production
- C. C. Adcock – production and mixing
