= Gap Dream =

American psychedelic synthpop band

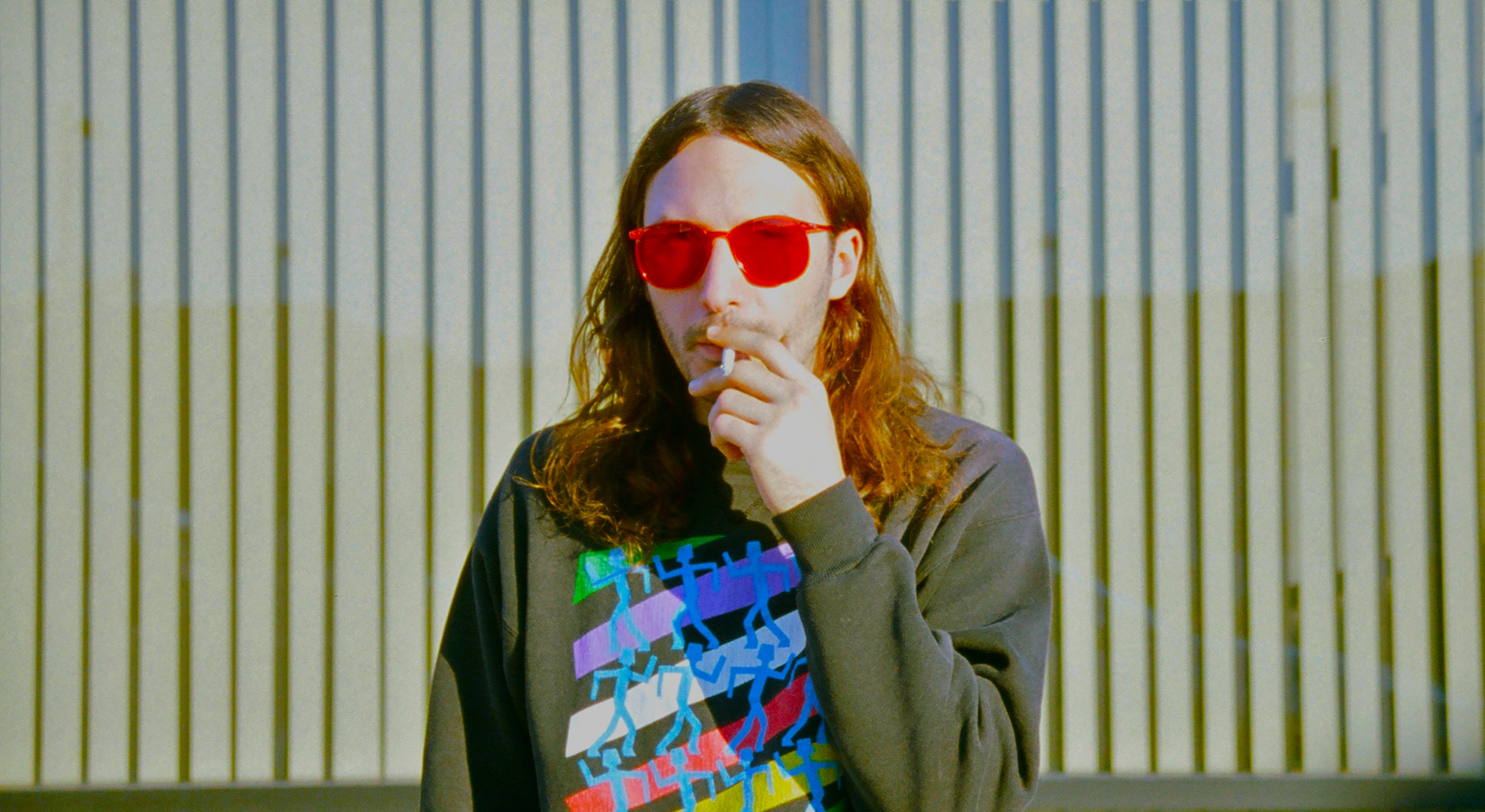
- Gabe Fulvimar

Background information
- Origin: Cleveland, Ohio, United States
- Genres: Synthpop; beach pop; electronic; psychedelic rock
- Years active: 2011–present
- Labels: Burger Records, Suicide Squeeze Records, Fat Possum Records
- Members: Gabriel Fulvimar, Bobby May, Corey Lanigan
- Past members: Gabe Niles, Noa Niles, Zak Hudson, Ryan Matricardi, Lee Sackett, Jason Look, Mandy Aramouni, Matt Schmalfield, Fletcher C. Johnson, Mike Reinhart
- Website: gapdream.bandcamp.com

Gap Dream is an American psychedelic synthpop band founded by Gabe Fulvimar in 2012 in Fullerton, California. As the band's singer, songwriter and instrumentalist, Fulvimar is the only regular member of Gap Dream and solely responsible for its musical direction. In live performances, Fulvimar is accompanied by guitarist Corey Lanigan, and bassist Bobby May.

Gap Dream's sound owes its origins to Fulvimar's love of 60s psychedelic pop combined with his interest in vintage synthesizer sounds. Born in Akron, Ohio, he grew up listening to Sonic Youth, Pavement and was in an early version of The Black Keys.

In 2010, Fulvimar met Burger Records cofounder Lee Rickard during a Burgermania artist tour, which had stopped in Cleveland, Ohio, Fulvimar's home at the time. Inspired by the Burger artists performing that day, he kept in touch with the Burger team, eventually sending them a sampling of self-recorded demos. Impressed, Burger released Gap Dream's self-titled album on cassette in January 2012, followed by the January 2013 release Shine Your Light, a project on which he collaborated with Conspiracy of Owls guitarist/vocalist Bobby Harlow. In December 2013, Fulmiver's Gap Dream project covered The Velvet Underground's "Sister Ray", Lou Reed's 17-minute ode to the gritty underside of New York City, on Burger Records' White Light/White Heat tribute.

In July 2020, Gap Dream was included in accusations of sexual assault surrounding Burger Records, which led to the collapse of the Burger Records label and store.

== Discography ==
=== Albums ===
- This Is Gap Dream (2016, Burger Records)
- Shine Your Light (2013, Burger Records)
- Gap Dream (2012, Burger Records)

=== Singles ===
- Ali Baba (2012, Suicide Squeeze Records)
- Chill Spot b/w Peter's Brother (2013, Burger Records)
- Generator b/w A Little Past Midnight 2012
- Peter's Brother (Instrumental Version) (2013 Burger Records, Philthy Phonographic Records)
- Shine Your Love (2013, Fat Possum Records)
