= Thanksgiving (band) =

American experimental folk musician

Adrian Orange
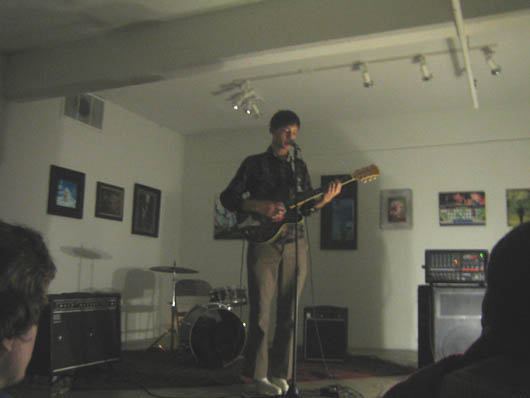
- Adrian Orange, performing live, under the moniker, Thanksgiving, January 2005

Background information
- Born: Adrian Orange; March 20, 1986 (age 40)
- Origin: Portland, Oregon, United States
- Genres: Indie rock, Experimental rock
- Occupations: Musician, songwriter
- Instruments: Singing, Guitar, Drums
- Years active: 1999–present
- Labels: Marriage, K, Gnar Tapes, Rubber Brother, Dead Doctors Don't Lie

Thanksgiving and Adrian Orange & Her Band are the names under which Portland, Oregon singer/songwriter Adrian Orange (born March 20, 1986) performs. First adopting the "Thanksgiving" moniker around 1999–2000, Orange played experimental folk music, often accompanying himself on guitar and self-recording his albums using analog equipment. While Thanksgiving is essentially a solo act, Orange often collaborates with other musicians in his recordings and performances.

== Overview ==
=== Thanksgiving (1999-2006) ===
Thanksgiving's debut We Could Be Each Other's Evidence was released by Vit! Vit! Recordings when Orange was just fifteen years old. In 2000 he co-founded Marriage Records with Curtis Knapp and released his second album Nothing on the label the following year. Orange was notably prolific during this period, releasing six albums (including one self-titled triple LP), three EPs and several singles under the name Thanksgiving on various labels. He also played drums in the instrumental group The Watery Graves of Portland alongside Knapp and Davis Lee Hooker, and toured and recorded with YACHT, Phil Elverum (The Microphones, Mount Eerie) and Geneviève Castrée.

=== Adrian Orange & Her Band (2006-07) ===
In 2006 Orange released the LP Bitches Is Lord under his own name and toured the world with a nine-piece backing band, initially known as Child Slave Rebellion and later Adrian Orange & Her Band. The touring group, featuring members of LAKE, François & the Atlas Mountains and Rozi Plain, recreated older Thanksgiving material with new textures and instrumentation described variously as "rogue West African prison-funk" and "acid-tinged dub-jam nomad blues". In February 2007, the band reconvened at Dub Narcotic Studio in Olympia, Washington, to record a self-titled LP, released later that year on K Records. They also released the single "Interdependance Dance" as part of the label's long-running International Pop Underground 7" series.

Adrian Orange & Her Band received mixed responses from critics, although Tiny Mix Tapes described the album as "groundbreaking" and Drowned in Sound praised it as "a vital snapshot of a singer engaged in a constant process of artistic discovery and renewal, with startling, fascinating, often wondrous results".

=== Recent projects ===
In late 2007, Orange adopted the moniker Lyllyys (and later AOK) and began performing with the greater Portland, Oregon, experimental music scene, including members of Rob Walmart, Jackie-O Motherfucker and White Rainbow. Around this time, he contributed vocals to the LP Naked Acid by Valet and released two CDRs of free-form, electronic work.

In 2011, Gnar Tapes released a double cassette of Orange's experimental recordings entitled Deep Stain Doublest Dubba Dope Duba Stank Dank Tape. According to the label, Orange had "suffered a near complete mental collapse, triggered by all manners of fatigue" following his most recent world tour and for a time "very few were aware of [his] activities or whereabouts." He has since recorded and performed sporadically, at one point having relocated to Kekaha, Hawai'i.

As of the 2020s, Orange has reportedly continued to experience significant mental health issues. On August 27, 2026, Orange was arrested and criminally charged after he allegedly attempted to burn down Vinyl Resting Place, a record shop in Portland.

== Influence on other musicians ==
Orange has been cited as an influence by Laura Marling and praised by the likes of David Longstreth (Dirty Projectors) and Charlie Fink of Noah and the Whale.

== Discography ==
=== Albums ===
- We Could Be Each Other's Evidence CD (2002, Vit! Vit! Records)
- Nothing CD (2002, Marriage Records)
- Welcome Nowhere CDR/LP (2004, P.W. Elverum & Sun - re-released in 2007 with bonus material)
- The River CD (2005, Marriage Records/Hive-Fi Recordings)
- Thanksgiving triple LP + CD (2005, Marriage Records/P.W. Elverum & Sun)
- Cave Days And Moments CD (2006, Marriage Records)
- Bitches Is Lord CD/LP (2006, Marriage Records - as Adrian Orange)
- Adrian Orange & Her Band CD/LP (2007, K Records - as Adrian Orange & Her Band)
- L.S. = M.F.T. Cassette (2020, Dead Doctors Don't Lie - as Adrian Orange)

=== EPs, singles, cassettes and digital releases ===
- Now It Is All Over Like The Birds CD EP (2004, Marriage Records)
- "The Lake At Night"/ "In The Lake" 7" single (2004, Marriage Records)
- The Ghost & The Eyes w/ Trees in the Ground, Outside the Window CD EP (2004, States Rights Records)
- The "In The World" Or Six New Songs of Thanksgiving 10" EP (2005, Marriage Records)
- "Bitches Is Lord" / "We'll Die" (Live at Barden's Boudoir) lathe-cut 7" single (2006, Twenty Bees)
- Twenty-Six Examples / Thanksgiving split cassette EP with Thee Moths (2006, Undereducated)
- "Interdependance Dance" 7" (2007, K Records / International Pop Underground - as Adrian Orange & Her Band)
- AJO CDR EP (2007, Marriage Records - as Lyllyy's Adrian Orange)
- Zone Out: The Prequel CDR EP (2008, self-released - as AOK)
- Deep Stain Doublest Dubba Dope Duba Stank Dank Tape double cassette (2011, Gnar Tapes - as Adrian Orange)
- Four Songs cassette (2012, Gnar Tapes - as Adrian Orange)
- The Blue Twilight digital album (2013, Shatter Your Leaves - as Thanksgiving)
- Thanksgiving / R.Ariel cassette (2014, Rubber Brothers Records)
