= Brad Adkins =

American self-taught artist and curator

- Born: 1973 (age 52–53); Kalispell, Montana
- Occupation: Artist

Brad Adkins (born 1973) is an American artist and curator.

Adkins work has been presented at The Art Gym, Consolidated Works, Douglas F. Cooley Memorial Gallery, The Portland Art Museum, and PICA. Between 2002 and 2004, Adkins curated a print gallery and a broadside for The Oregon Review of the Arts.

Between 2001 and 2004, he collaborated with Christopher Buckingham on projects and exhibitions under the name Charm Bracelet.

He was born in Kalispell, Montana.
