= Naytronix =

US musical group since 2012

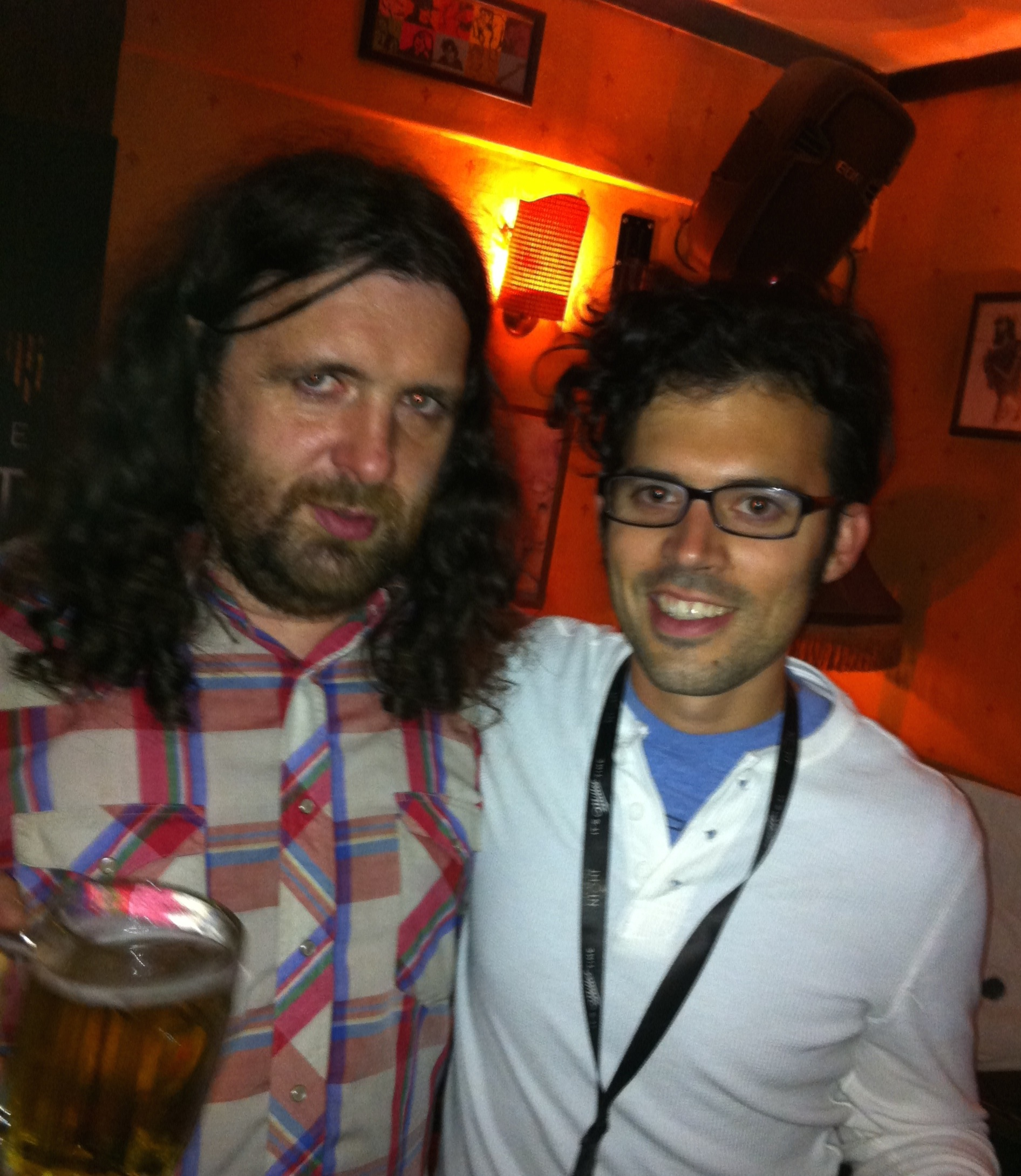
- Naytronix (right) with DJ Fitz

Background information
- Origin: Oakland, United States
- Genres: experimental pop, indie electronic
- Years active: 2012–present
- Label: Plug Research
- Members: Nate Brenner
- Website: naytronix.com

Naytronix is the solo musical project of Nate Brenner, an American multi-instrumentalist, vocalist and producer who is also a member of the band Tune-Yards.

== History ==
Brenner released the self-titled Naytronix EP May 7, 2012 followed by his debut album Dirty Glow on October 9, 2012. Both releases were on the Los Angeles record label Plug Research. During the fall of 2012 Naytronix went on a tour supporting the band Why? in the US as well as playing a few shows in Europe. A second album, Mister Divine, was released October 15, 2015. The most recent album Other Possibilities was released October 29, 2021.

== Members ==
- Nate Brenner - bass, vocals, synths, sampler, vocoder.

== Touring Members ==
- Sam Ospovat - drums, vocals (Dirty Glow tour)
- Emery Barter - guitar, vocals, minitaur (Dirty Glow tour)
- Merrill Garbus - bass, vocals, Juno 60, drums (Naytronix EP tour)

== Discography ==
- Naytronix (2012)
- Dirty Glow (2012)
- Mister Divine (2015)
- Air (2019)
- Other Possibilities (2021)
