= Highly Publicized Digital Boxing Match =

Studio album by Afuche
- Released: May 31, 2011
- Genre: Indie rock
- Length: 38:54
- Label: Cuneiform Records

Afuche chronology
I Made Dots (2009)	Highly Publicized; Digital Boxing Match (2011)

Highly Publicized Digital Boxing Match is the second album by Afuche, a band founded in Brooklyn in 2008. The album was released on May 31, 2011. It has been called the most innovative album of 2011, specifically by WVAU.org.

== Reception ==
Professional ratings
Review scores
Source	Rating
Robert Christgau	(3-star Honorable Mention)
Trust Me, I'm a Scientist	(positive)

== Track listing ==
1. Monster Smith
2. Who're They
3. They're in There
4. Danice Marino
5. Here's to Here's to Toast
6. Here's to Toast
7. Initialeone
8. Gulf
9. Pablo Leon
10. Muscovy
11. TH Sq'd

== Personnel ==
- Ruben Sindo Acosta – keyboard, vocals, percussion
- Zach Ryalls – guitar
- Denny Tek – bass
- Andrew Carrico – baritone sax
- Max Jaffe – drums
