= Born on Flag Day =

Studio album by Deer Tick
- Released: June 23, 2009
- Recorded: September 2008
- Genre: Indie rock, alternative country
- Length: 40:25
- Label: Partisan Records

Deer Tick chronology
War Elephant (2007)	Born on Flag Day (2009)	The Black Dirt Sessions (2010)

Professional ratings
Review scores
Source	Rating
AbsolutePunk.net	(80%) link
AllMusic	link
Clash	link
PopMatters	link
Pitchfork	(5.3/10) link
Robert Christgau	A– link

Born on Flag Day is the second album by American indie-rock band Deer Tick.

== Track listing ==
No.	Title	Writer(s)	Length
1.	"Easy"	John Joseph McCauley III	3:52
2.	"Little White Lies"	McCauley	3:39
3.	"Smith Hill"	McCauley	3:41
4.	"Song About A Man"	McCauley	3:26
5.	"Houston, TX"	McCauley	3:44
6.	"Straight Into a Storm"	McCauley	3:30
7.	"Friday XIII"	McCauley / Liz Isenberg	2:40
8.	"The Ghost"	McCauley	3:31
9.	"Hell On Earth"	McCauley	3:18
10.	"Stung" (running slightly under three minutes, followed by a three-minute gap, followed by a live cover of "Goodnight Irene")	McCauley	11:02
