= War Elephant (album) =

Studio album by Deer Tick
- Released: September 4, 2007
- Recorded: 2007
- Genre: Indie rock, alternative country
- Length: 48:05
- Label: FEOW! Records

Deer Tick chronology
War Elephant (2007)	Born on Flag Day (2009)

Professional ratings
Review scores
Source	Rating
Allmusic	3.5/5 stars
Pitchfork	5.8/10
The Line of Best Fit	60%

War Elephant is the debut album by Deer Tick. It was originally released September 4, 2007 on FEOW! Records. After parting ways with their label, Deer Tick continued touring without a repress of the album they were supporting. Partisan Records re-released War Elephant on November 11, 2008.

== Track listing ==
All songs written by John McCauley, except for where noted.

1. "Ashamed" (2:15)
2. "Art Isn't Real (City of Sin)" (2:50)
3. "Standing at the Threshold" (2:28)
4. "Dirty Dishes" (3:19)
5. "Long Time" (3:47)
6. "Nevada" (2:47)
7. "Baltimore Blues No. 1" (3:02)
8. "These Old Shoes" (Chris Paddock) (2:21)
9. "Not So Dense" (4:23)
10. "Spend the Night" (2:29)
11. "Diamond Rings 2007" (4:42)
12. "Sink or Swim" (4:55)
13. "Christ Jesus" (5:20)
14. "What Kind of Fool Am I?" (Leslie Bricusse, Anthony Newley) (3:33)
