= Diamond Rugs =

American indie rock group

- Genre: Indie rock
- Years active: 2010–present
- Label: Partisan Records
- Members: Steve Berlin; Robbie Crowell; Bryan Dufresne; John McCauley; Hardy Morris; Ian Saint Pé
- Website: http://www.diamondrugs.net/

Diamond Rugs is an American band project, composed of John McCauley and keyboardist Robbie Crowell of Deer Tick, Ian Saint Pé of The Black Lips, Hardy Morris of Dead Confederate, Steve Berlin of Los Lobos, and Bryan Dufresne of Six Finger Satellite. Their eponymous album, Diamond Rugs, was released on April 24, 2012, and second album, Cosmetics, on February 24, 2015.

== Members ==
Current

- Steve Berlin – piano, keyboard, horns (2010–present)
- Robbie Crowell – bass, piano, keyboard, saxophone (2010–present)
- Bryan Dufresne – drums (2010–present)
- John McCauley – vocals, guitar (2010–present)
- Hardy Morris – vocals, guitar (2010–present)
- Ian Saint Pé – vocals, guitar (2010–present)

== Discography ==
Albums

- Diamond Rugs (2012)
- Cosmetics (2015)

Singles

Year	Title	Album
2013	"Hightail"	Diamond Rugs
