= Deer Tick (band) =

American alternative rock band

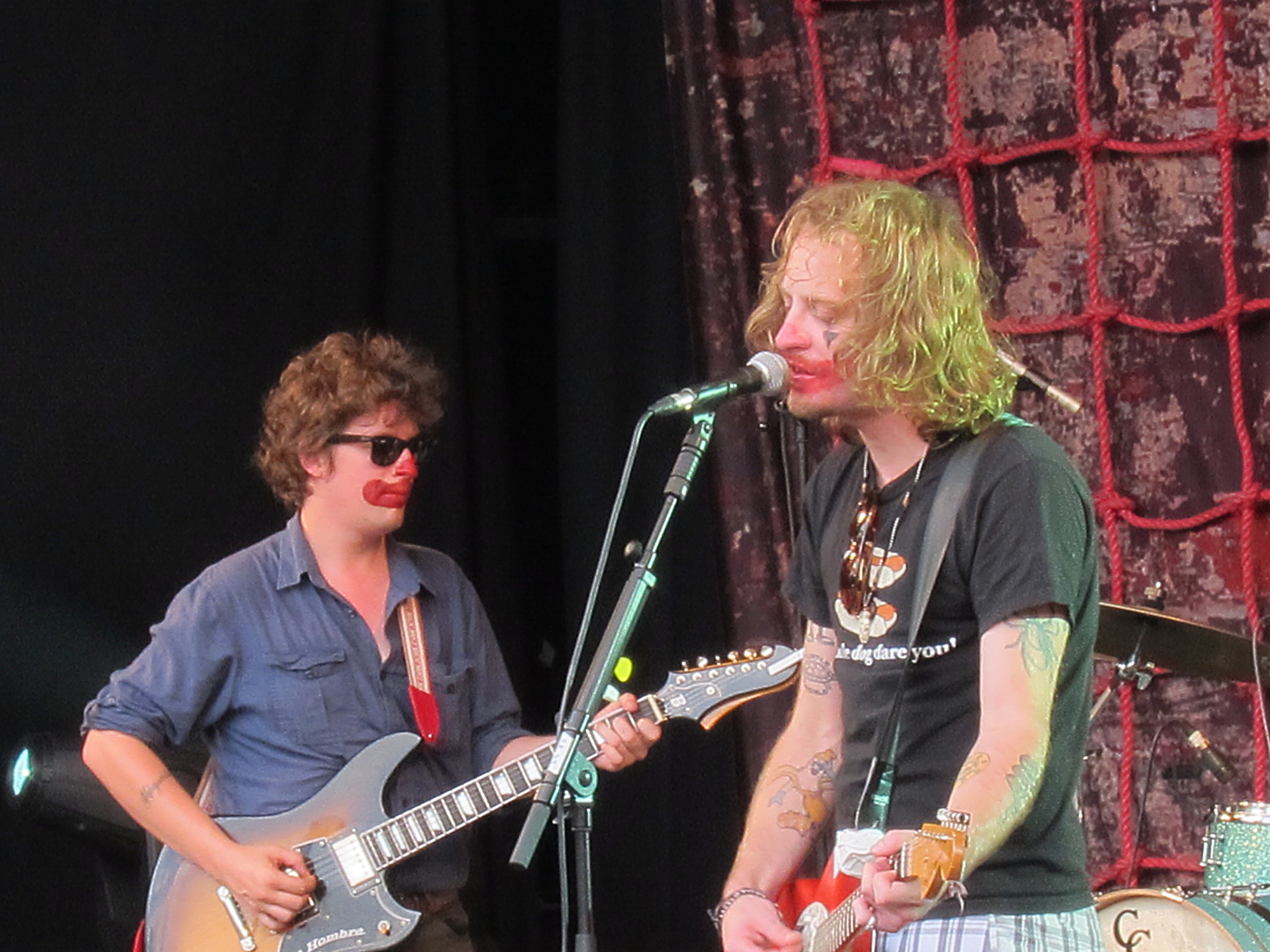
- Performing at the Summer Sundae festival, Leicester, August 2012

Background information
- Origin: Providence, Rhode Island, U.S.
- Genres: Alternative rock; indie rock; Americana
- Years active: 2004–present
- Labels: Partisan; Loose Music; Fargo; Feow!
- Members: John Joseph McCauley; Christopher Dale Ryan; Dennis Michael Ryan; Ian Patrick O'Neil
- Past members: Paul Marandola; James Falzone; Diego Perez; Andrew Tobiassen; Robert Barry Crowell
- Website: deertickmusic.com

Deer Tick is an American alternative rock-folk band from Providence, Rhode Island, composed of singer-songwriter John J. McCauley, guitarist Ian O'Neil, bassist Christopher Ryan and drummer Dennis Ryan.

The band's music has been described as rock with folk, blues and country influences, although the band actively rebels against the country tag, stating "We're proud not to sing with a twang". The band regularly performs cover versions in their live sets, including songs by the likes of The Replacements, Nirvana, John Prine, Hank Williams, the Beastie Boys, Warren Zevon and Sonny West. They have also performed entire sets as Deervana, a Nirvana tribute band, including a show in September 2013 to mark the 20th anniversary of the band's third album In Utero.

McCauley explained that inspiration for the name "Deer Tick" came while hiking in summer 2005 in the Morgan–Monroe State Forest near Bloomington, Indiana, where he found a deer tick on his scalp one evening, having never come into contact with one before despite having frequently gone camping and fishing as a child.

== History ==
=== Early days ===
Deer Tick began in December 2004 as a duo called My Other Face, a vehicle for John McCauley's songwriting. Having previously played in high school bands Kadaver, El Toro and Metro Savages, McCauley changed direction from the heavier rock music he had grown up with after discovering Hank Williams.

Playing their first gig at The Growroom in Providence, the duo regularly gigged across Rhode Island, Massachusetts and New York with the likes of Chris Paddock, Jana Hunter and Diego Perez. Having parted ways with drummer Paul Marandola, McCauley dropped the My Other Face name and toured across the US in May 2005 with Viking Moses. While holding down menial jobs including as a movie projectionist and a waiter at a Chinese restaurant, McCauley continued touring the country with Miranda Stokes, Mandarin Dynasty and Nat Baldwin.

After a year of touring and selling his music on handmade CD-Rs, he returned to Providence with a newfound confidence and songs including "Dirty Dishes", "Art Isn't Real (City Of Sin)" and "Ashamed". Up until mid-2007 McCauley was the only official member of the band, instead opting to play with a revolving cast of musicians including Marandola and keyboard player James Falzone. With the desire to make Deer Tick a real band, in April 2007 he asked GRSHN Lifestyle and 14 Foot 1 drummer Dennis Ryan from neighbouring Pawtucket to join; he instantly agreed. McCauley had previously tried to get Dennis' half brother Chris Ryan, an old high school friend and local bass player who had played with Stefan Couture And The Campfire Orchestra, to join the band full-time, but he had been unable to join due to finishing off a music degree at Providence College. Following a nationwide tour and having finished his degree, Chris Ryan finally joined.

=== War Elephant ===
The band released their debut album War Elephant on September 4, 2007, via Jana Hunter's Houston-based Feow! Records. Recorded prior to the arrival of Dennis and Chris Ryan, neither appear on the album, with McCauley playing most of the instruments with help from Brian McOmber from Dirty Projectors, Nat Baldwin and James Falzone. The album featured "These Old Shoes," a cover of a song by Chris Paddock. After the initial CD run sold out by January 2008 and a dispute over royalty payments arose, the album was left out of print, leaving the band touring with no proper copies of the album to sell. McCauley would sometimes burn copies of the album on CD-R to sell at gigs.

=== Born on Flag Day ===
In August 2008, the three piece expanded their lineup with lead guitarist Andrew Tobiassen, from Florida. In September 2008, the band recorded their second album Born on Flag Day at Yellow House Studios in Baltimore, Maryland and signed to Partisan Records after the label's owner Tim Putnam saw the band play at the Knitting Factory in Brooklyn and offered them a record deal a few weeks later at a gig in Providence.

Partisan first re-released War Elephant on November 11, 2008, with Born on Flag Day released on June 23, 2009. The album received wide critical acclaim, with Rolling Stone proclaiming it the "Country-Rock break-through of the Year". The band continued to tour the US extensively, and eventually toured Europe. McCauley felt that while listeners didn't have to listen to his "hack drumming and bass playing" as on War Elephant, the band were underrehearsed and that the album was rushed.

=== The Black Dirt Sessions ===
In January 2009, the band entered Black Dirt Studios in upstate New York with producer Jason Meagher to record every song they had left that was unrecorded for the band to "see what we could make out of it". The first release from the sessions was the More Fuel for the Fire EP and included the Andrew Tobiassen written and sung song "Dance Of Love." The second release from the sessions was the band's third album The Black Dirt Sessions, released on June 8, 2010. Springfield, Massachusetts native and former Titus Andronicus and La Guillotine guitarist Ian O'Neil joined the band in June 2009, expanding the lineup to five, and added rhythm guitar to several songs during the later recording sessions. Lead guitarist Andrew Tobiassen amicably left the band to pursue his own music prior to the end of the sessions. Chris Ryan revealed that he believed the album "gels more than Born on Flag Day. I think we all mean it more. We're all a lot more comfortable with what we're doing". McCauley added that he had "kind of grown to hate War Elephant and Flag Day knowing how much ass this new one kicks".

On June 16, 2010, Deer Tick made their network television debut on the Late Show with David Letterman. Although the appearance came only a week after the new album was released, Deer Tick did not perform anything from The Black Dirt Sessions, and instead chose to play a song from their debut album, "Baltimore Blues No. 1." Renowned British music journalist and editor Allan Jones wrote in Uncut magazine that "Deer Tick noisily essayed the kind of rock 'n' roll you don't hear these days as often as you'd maybe like, the sort that lights up everything around it like a burning house, and feel inclined therefore to cheer until you're hoarse when you do". The band signed a deal with French label Fargo Records to distribute all three albums throughout the United Kingdom and Europe. In July 2010, keyboard player Rob Crowell joined the band after becoming a fan of the band and supporting the band on tour while playing in Arkansas-born singer-songwriter Christopher Denny's backing band. A multi-instrumentalist from Fredericton, New Brunswick, Canada, Crowell had previously worked with musicians from various genres including the likes of Willie Nile, Matt Mays and Doug Riley and produced an album by Gloryhound. McCauley commented when Crowell joined "he was talented in a schooled kind of way".

Having previously debuted the project at the previous year's South By Southwest festival, McCauley released his collaboration with Matt Vasquez of Delta Spirit and Taylor Goldsmith of Dawes in the form of the self-titled Middle Brother album in March 2011. Middle Brother performed together at the 2011 Newport Folk Festival.

=== Divine Providence ===
On October 24, 2011, the band released their fourth album Divine Providence. Produced by Cosmic Thug production duo Adam Landry and Justin Collins, the album was the first to feature the current and definitive lineup of the band and displayed a louder and rawer sound than previous releases, with the band aiming to capture "the raw and spontaneous kerosene blaze" of their live show, admitting that they "just kind of got sick of hearing the words indie-folk and shit like that." The album saw the band compared to The Kinks, The Rolling Stones and The Replacements. A secret track was included in the form of "Mr Cigarette" written by The Replacements' Paul Westerberg. Although the band were told by his manager that Westerberg had written the song especially for the band, it had previously been released as part of a 30-minute download Grandpaboy's Last Stand the previous year. The album was also the first to feature songs written and sung by other members, "Walkin Out the Door" and "Now It's Your Turn" by O'Neil and "Clownin Around" by Dennis Ryan, a song written about and from the perspective of the serial child murderer John Wayne Gacy.

The change in direction resulted in a mixed reception from some critics and fans, with McCauley simply stating that it was just the natural evolution of the band and that the previous confusion caused by the gulf between their albums and live shows was "getting kind of old." The band expected some fans to hate it, but McCauley stated that "first and foremost, it's music and the record I wanted to make. Our live shows are really different than our records. So we wanted to get in a room and hit record, just go there". Commenting on the production, McCauley revealed that he actually liked "listening to it. I haven't really gotten there with any previous recordings. It's a lot more accurate as to what we enjoy listening to." The album was named after a "very blasphemous anti-Christian metal song" written by Dennis Ryan which they were going to release later as a split single with a metal band, with McCauley stating that he didn't "want to be stuck just doing one thing ever," but remains unreleased. The album was released in the UK and Europe via Loose Music, who issued the album with the band's US vinyl/digital only EP Tim as a bonus CD. Tim was culled from the same sessions as the album and featured live staple "Born At Zero," commenting on the fact that the sessions produced a lot of material O'Neil stated that the band "had two really good producers that got a lot of good stuff out of us without letting us go. We focused a lot on performance."

In December 2011, O'Neil revealed that he along with Dennis Ryan and Titus Andronicus bassist and old school friend Julian Veronesi were working on a project called Dirt Naps. In April 2012, the self-titled debut album by Diamond Rugs, a band formed and co-fronted by McCauley with Hardy Morris of Dead Confederate and Ian Saint Pé of Black Lips, was released. The album also featured Rob Crowell on bass with drummer Bryan Dufresne from Six Finger Satellite and former Los Lobos member Steve Berlin. A second Diamond Rugs album, titled Cosmetics, was recorded during a 9-day recording session in August 2013.

=== Negativity ===
On September 24, 2013, the band released their fifth album Negativity. The album was produced by Steve Berlin and displayed a slicker polished sound than previous releases, with McCauley revealing that Berlin changed the structure of every song he took to the sessions and "doesn't settle for any of that kind of raggedy, kind of charming, first take kind of sound." Crowell added that "Steve had a really large hand in shaping this album" and that "there is a fair bit of layering on the album, but I like it as the keyboardist, because there is more keyboards." The album was preceded by the Ian O'Neil song "The Dream's In The Ditch," which was originally intended for his Dirt Naps project. The band performed the song on Conan on September 25, 2013. Many of McCauley's songs on the album were written on piano instead of guitar and were put together while on vacation in Namibia and Johannesburg in 2012. The band demoed close to 30 songs for the album, with Berlin picking 12 to work on including a duet with pop singer Vanessa Carlton on "In Our Time." McCauley later married Carlton in December 2013 in a ceremony officiated by former Fleetwood Mac singer Stevie Nicks. The album was influenced by recent events in McCauley's life including his father, a Democrat who represented Providence, pleading guilty to filing false tax returns and conspiring to defraud the federal government of more than $500,000 resulting in a 27-month prison sentence and a $10,000 fine, the death of his uncle, his wedding engagement to Nikki Kvarnes of Nashville band Those Darlins collapsing due to his drug use and drinking and subsequently getting clean from drugs. The song "Mr. Sticks" is about family struggles with the title being his father's childhood nickname and "Pot Of Gold" is a "stream of consciousness recollection of what went through my head and what kinds of misadventures I got myself into when I was doing crack." Throughout 2013, O'Neil and the Ryan brothers played several shows with Ravi Shavi frontman Rafay Rashid in their new side project Happiness.

On 16 January 2017, keyboard player Robert Crowell confirmed his involvement with the upcoming Deer Tick album while announcing his departure from the band.

=== Vol. 1 & Vol. 2 ===
After the release of Negativity, the band took a break from their usually intensive work schedule to focus on other things. However, when they did start playing shows together again, they found renewed motivation to record. On 15 September 2017, the band released two eponymous albums simultaneously. The first, Vol. 1, was largely a folk album, akin to their early work, while Vol. 2 was more focused on the rock sound they developed in later years.

In October 2018 McCauley joined Dave Grohl, Krist Novoselic and Pat Smear on stage at the Cal Jam '18 festival to perform three Nirvana songs, "Serve The Servants," "Scentless Apprentice" and "In Bloom."

In 2019, the band released a compilation album, titled Mayonnaise. It compiled alternate versions of songs from their self-titled albums with covers and a handful of newly written tracks.

In 2021 the band was part of the Newport Folk Festival in July.

=== Emotional Contracts ===
Emotional Contracts was released on June 16, 2023, through ATO Records, marking the band's debut on the label. The band's eighth studio album was produced by Dave Fridmann and was their first release since the pair of self-titled albums in 2017. The ten-track album featured guest appearances from Steve Berlin of Los Lobos, Courtney Marie Andrews, and Vanessa Carlton, among others, and was described by the band as their most collaborative record to date.

=== Coin-O-Matic ===
Coin-O-Matic, the band's ninth studio album, was announced in March 2026 for release on June 5, 2026, through ATO Records. Recorded at the band's home studio in Providence, Rhode Island, it marked their first self-produced album in their two-decade career. The album's title references a cigarette-vending-machine company that served as a front for notorious Providence mobster Raymond Patriarca, with the record exploring the hidden histories of working-class Rhode Island life. The lead single, "Mary Singletary", was released alongside the announcement.

== Members ==
Current

- John Joseph McCauley – lead vocals, guitar (2004–present)
- Christopher Dale Ryan – bass, upright bass, backing vocals (2007–present)
- Dennis Michael Ryan – drums, backing vocals (2007–present)
- Ian Patrick O'Neil – guitar, backing vocals (2009–present)

Former

- Paul Marandola
- James Falzone
- Diego Perez
- Andrew Tobiassen – guitar, backing vocals (2008–2009)
- Robert Barry Crowell – piano, keyboard, saxophone, backing vocals (2010–2017)

== Discography ==
=== Studio albums ===
- War Elephant (2007, FEOW! Records)
- Born on Flag Day (2009, Partisan Records)
- The Black Dirt Sessions (2010, Partisan Records)
- Divine Providence, (2011, Partisan Records / 2012, Loose Music)
- Negativity (2013, Partisan Records)
- Deer Tick, Vol. 1 (2017, Partisan Records)
- Deer Tick, Vol. 2 (2017, Partisan Records)
- Emotional Contracts (2023, ATO Records)
- Coin-O-Matic (2026, ATO Records)

=== Compilation album ===
- Mayonnaise (2019, Partisan Records)

=== Live album ===
- Live at Fort Adams (2021, Dads In Charge Records)

=== EPs ===
- Nat Baldwin/Deer Tick Split (2006, Tabel Tapes)
- Deer Tick/The Shivers Split (2009, Natrix Records)
- More Fuel for the Fire (2009, Partisan Records)
- Deer Tick / Jonny Corndawg – Water Friends For? (2010, Partisan Records)
- Holy Shit, It's Christmas! (2010, Partisan Records)
- Tim (EP) (2012, Partisan Records / Loose Music)
- Contractual Obligations (2024, ATO Records)

=== Singles ===
Year	Song	Peak chart positions	Album
Year	Song	US AAA	Album
2009	"Easy"	—	Born on Flag Day
2010	"20 Miles"	—	The Black Dirt Sessions
2011	"Main Street"	—	Divine Providence
2011	"Miss K"	—	Divine Providence
2013	"The Rock"	—	Negativity
2017	"Sea of Clouds"	—	Deer Tick Vol. 1
2017	"Jumpstarting"	20	Deer Tick Vol. 1
2017	"It's a Whale"	—	Deer Tick Vol. 2
2023	"Forgiving Ties"	12	Emotional Contacts
2026	"Mary Singletary"	20	Coin-o-Matic
2026	"Everything Born"	—	Coin-o-Matic
