= Department of Safety =

Defunct community space in Anacortes, Washington

Coordinates: 48°30′45″N 122°36′49″W

Department of Safety, Anacortes, Washington

The Department of Safety was an artist-run community space founded in 2002, located in Anacortes, Washington's old police and fire station. It housed an all-ages music venue, art gallery, artist residency program, zine library, darkroom, artists' studios and living amenities for a handful of residents. Department of Safety provided hostel accommodations for travelers from 2002 until 2005, when the operators decided to focus on the Artist in Residence program. Department of Safety hosted music festivals, workshops, high school classes, hundreds of concerts, art exhibits, recording sessions, weddings, halloween parties and lectures.

== History ==
The model of the DoS suggested two years of commitment from residents to work on the space and programming itself while simultaneously giving those individuals access to facilities to focus on their own artistic practice. Residents paid rent and insurance to live in the space; the programming was not subsidized by other means. The building was owned by a local used-car salesman.

The DoS incubated numerous high school and independent music acts and artists. Families were often known to attend events as a unit. Programming reflected a direct commitment to community while also prioritizing national and international talent.

In January 2003 the DoS featured in an episode of The Savvy Traveler radio show.

The Department of Safety ceased operations in February 2010.
