= Lucky Dragons =

American music group

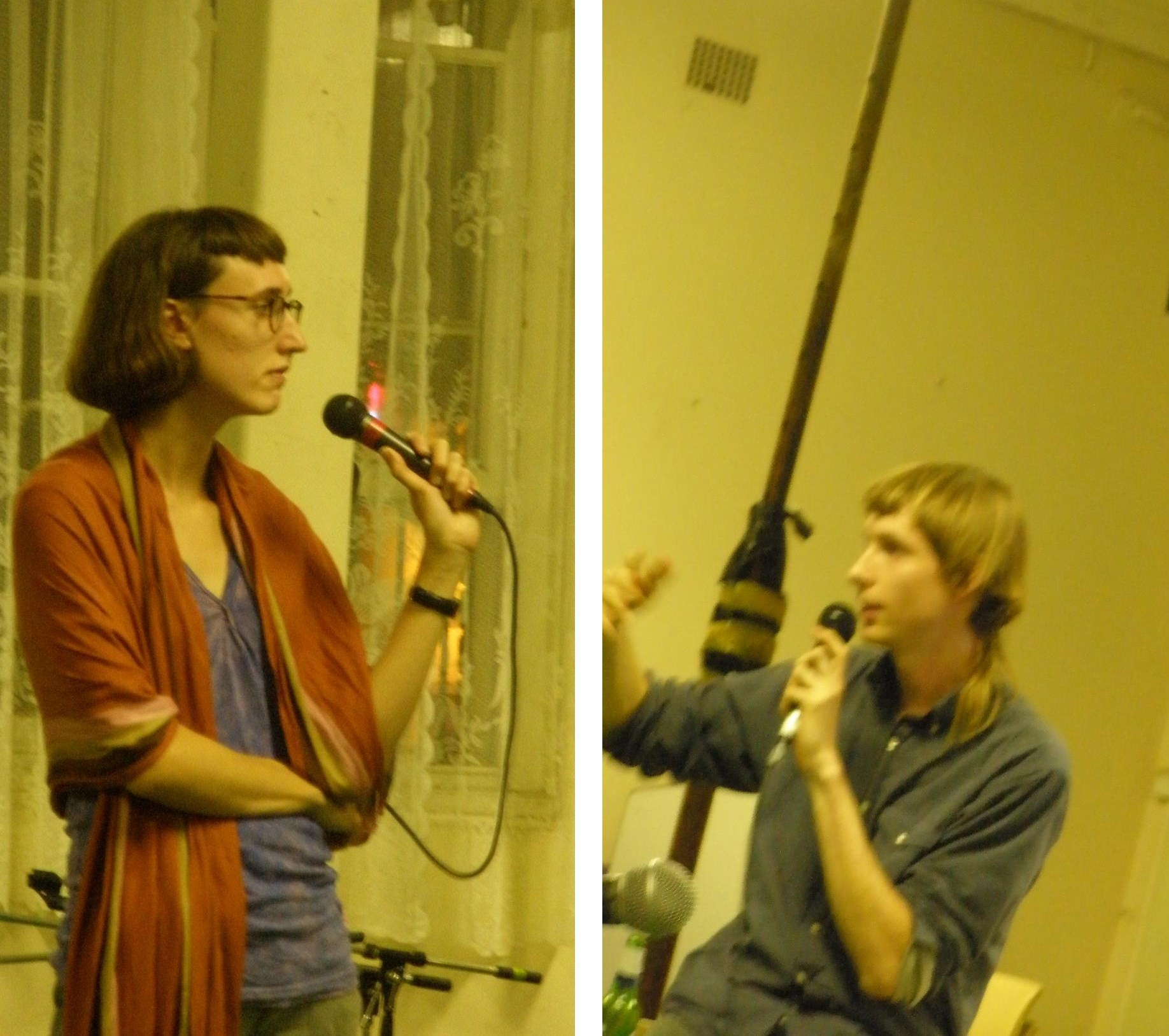

Background information
- Origin: Los Angeles, California
- Years active: 1999–present
- Labels: Marriage, Upset The Rhythm, Glaciers of Nice.
- Members: Luke Fischbeck; Sarah Rara
- Website: luckydragons.eqbal

Lucky Dragons is an experimental music group consisting of Luke Fischbeck and Sarah Rara. Based in Los Angeles, California, the band are noted for their unusual sound, described as having the ability to make "'everyday sounds' become alluringly other".

Lucky Dragons' performances include live music, video projection, and sounds created in collaboration with the audience. They have performed at the Smell, Echo Curio, Dublab, KCHUNG at major international art institutions and at the 2008 Whitney Biennial.

== History ==
Lucky Dragons were formed in 1999 and have created 19 albums as of November 2008. As well as making music as part of the Lucky Dragons, the band also run a "weekly collaborative drawing society" called Sumi Ink Club and an internet community called Glaciers of Nice.

Fischbeck explained that the duo were a band before they began creating just sounds. He said, "everything we've done since the beginning was to change the simple thing of what it means to be a band. This often, but not always, means making or rearranging sounds."

== Style ==
Though their songs have been described as having "entered the postsong age", Rara said that she felt music was "still very much in a song age" as "very few people are making work without a specific duration or end point". Rara said that the structure of Lucky Dragons' songs were very different, with some songs lasting only for "a few sputters" and with others that "revolve around shepherd tones and expand for hours". She stated that many of their songs "begin with improvisation" and said it was "like a game where the only rule is that each action must generate a kind of response or new action". The improvisation enables them to "keep moving in several new directions at once".

Fischbeck said "a song in my mind is something that is completed once it is distributed and can come back in a changed form through a listening reaction" and was the element that enabled him to continue to call the band's music songs, as opposed to what he called "the much more technologically neutral 'tracks,' which [don't] imply any human interaction at all".

The Stranger described two of the band's older albums, Norteñas and Future Feeling, as "employ[ing] a scrappy indietronica approach that sounds like Icelandic cuties Múm if they were raised on UK post-punk spazzes Swell Maps and hit "record" while buzzed on Jolt." Fischbeck noted that he felt the band's music was "maybe a mix between political and healing—meditative punk..."

== Music production ==
Rara stated that Lucky Dragons sometimes create two albums simultaneously, each with "completely different sensibilities", and upon completion decide which is better and release only that one. Fischbeck said that he liked "newness and creative reuse and multiple points of view" as the band edit sound to "isolate and amplify these aspects of everyday sounds."

The band use acoustic instruments to produce all of their sounds, though "the more 'pure' electronic sounds are processed recordings rather than generated from scratch".

For a project entitled, Make a Baby, Luke Fischbeck attached a number of wires together so that when two people hold two different wires and touch, it creates sound. The project was said to be "like when Tom Hanks jumps on the keyboard steps in Big. Or when you go to the aquarium for the first time and you realize that's what a starfish feels like, self discovery, science and a taste of natural sorcery."

== Live performances ==
Rara said that the band's live performances are created with the idea that they should "generate equal power-sharing situations between members of the audience and ourselves." This technique was described as "radical" as it was said to "encourage connections between show-goers over the standard-issue connection between a band and their creation and the audience's emotions".

== Discography ==
=== Albums ===
- f_uxus 0.10 (2000)
- Dark Falcon (2002)
- Hawks and Sparrows (2003)
- Shh...! (2004)
- Faults (2004)
- Bees (2005)
- A Sewing Circle (2005)
- Widows (2006)
- Heart Stopping/Drums of Passion (2006)
- Mini Dream Island (2006)
- Very Picture Disk (2007)
- Speak Your Own Language (2008)
- Dream Island Laughing Language (2008)
- Rara Speaks (2009)
- Existers (2012)
- Publicity Reform (2012)
- Long Form (2012)
- Live At NEST (2012)

=== EPs and singles ===
- Boys (2002)
- Nortenas (2004)
- Vrais Noms"/"True Names (2009)
- Open Power (2009)
- "Blond Rats" (2009)
- "A David Horvitz Picture Disc" (2012)
- "Speak Your Own Language (2012)
- "Bongo Music" (2013)

=== Splits ===
- Live on Radio Centraal (2004) with Yacht
- Future Feelings (2006) with Sweet Potatoes
- Layer Hater (2007) with Goodiepal
- Bleach on Bleach (2007) with Yacht
- Fear Melody (2008) with Whitman
- "Sorrow"/"Jubilance: Pt. 1" (2009) with Weekend
- Peter Burr's Special Effect (2015) with Seabat
