= Margo Price discography =

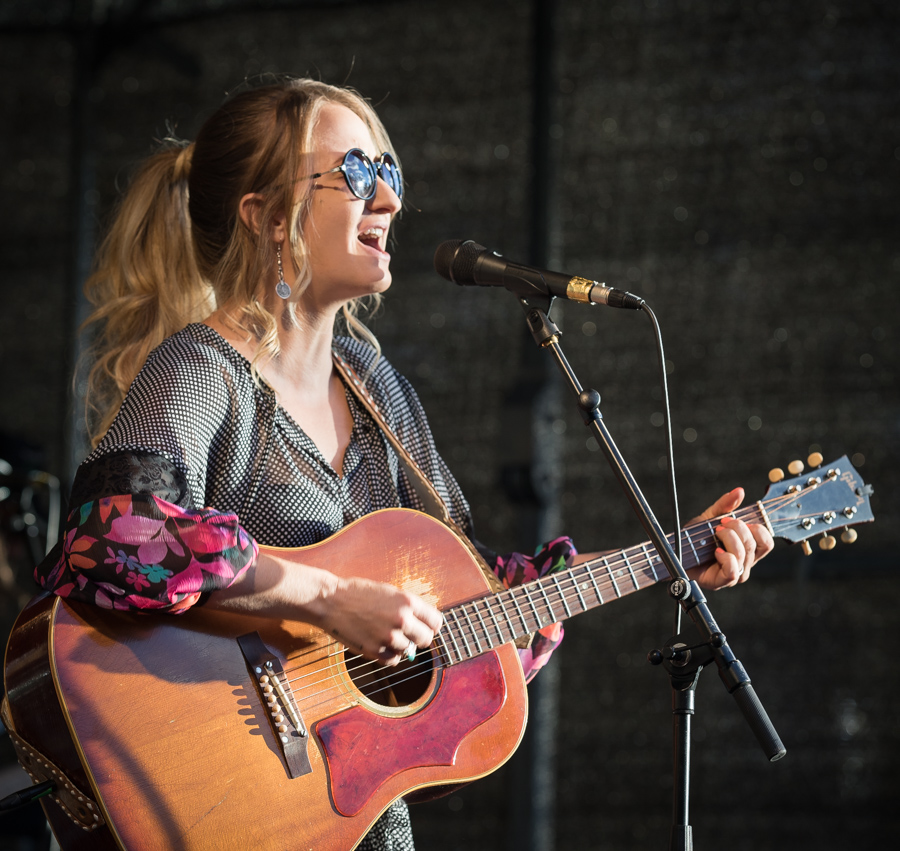
- Price performing at Piknik i Parken in 2017
- Studio albums: 5
- EPs: 1
- Live albums: 2
- Singles: 10
- Music videos: 7

American singer-songwriter Margo Price has released six studio albums, four live albums, one extended play (EP), fourteen singles, and seven music videos.

== Albums ==
=== Studio albums ===
Title	Details	Peak chart positions				Sales
Title	Details	US Country	US	US Indie	UK Country	Sales
Midwest Farmer's Daughter	Release date: March 25, 2016; Label: Third Man	10	189	11	1	US: 52,600
All American Made	Release date: October 20, 2017; Label: Third Man	12	89	6	1	US: 33,700
That's How Rumors Get Started	Release date: July 10, 2020; Label: Loma Vista	17	151	26	2	
Strays	Release date: January 13, 2023; Label: Loma Vista	30	—	49	1	
Hard Headed Woman	Release date: August 29, 2025; Label: Loma Vista	—	—	—	—	
Days of Unrest	Release date: July 3, 2026; Label: Loma Vista	—	—	—	—	

=== Live albums ===
Title	Details
Live at Rough Trade East / London, England / 19th May 2016	Release date: November 2016; Label: Third Man
Live at the Hamilton / Washington D.C. / 11-09-16	Release date: March 2017; Label: Third Man
Perfectly Imperfect at the Ryman	Release date: October 21, 2020; Label: Loma Vista; Bandcamp
Strays: Live At Grimey's	Release date: November 24, 2023; Label: Loma Vista

== Extended plays ==
Title	Details
Weakness	Release date: July 28, 2017; Label: Third Man

== Singles ==
List of singles, with selected chart positions, showing other relevant details
Title	Year	Peak chart positions	Album
Title	Year	US AAA	Album
"Hurtin' (On the Bottle)"	2015	—	Midwest Farmer's Daughter
"Hands of Time"	2016	—	Midwest Farmer's Daughter
"A Little Pain"	2017	—	All American Made
"Weakness"	2017	—	All American Made
"Stone Me"	2020	—	That's How Rumors Get Started
"Twinkle Twinkle"	2020	—	That's How Rumors Get Started
"Letting Me Down"	2020	—	That's How Rumors Get Started
"Been to the Mountain"	2022	—	Strays
"Change of Heart"	2022	22	Strays
"Lydia"	2022	—	Strays
"Shelter Me" / "Pump It Up"	2024	—	—
"Too Stoned to Cry"	2024	—	—
"Maggie's Farm"	2025	—	Days of Unrest
"Deportee" / "Oval Room"	2026	—	Days of Unrest
"—" denotes a recording that did not chart or was not released in that territory.

== Music videos ==
Year	Video	Director
2014	"Since You Put Me Down"	Joshua Shoemaker
2016	"Hurtin' (On the Bottle)"	Will Holland & Ryan Kendrick
2016	"Hands of Time"	Ben Chapell
2017	"Weakness"	Greg Crutcher
2018	"A Little Pain"	Mike Dempsey & Joshua Shoemaker
2018	"Leftovers"	Casey Pierce
2018	"All American Made"	Kimberly Stuckwisch & Carlos Lopez Estrada

== With Buffalo Clover ==
- Pick Your Poison (2010)
- Low Down Time (2011)
- Test Your Love (2013)
