= Hard Headed Woman (album) =

Studio album by Margo Price
- Released: August 29, 2025
- Studio: RCA Studio A
- Genre: Neotraditional country
- Label: Loma Vista
- Producer: Matt Ross-Spang

Margo Price chronology
Strays II (2023)	Hard Headed Woman (2025)	Days of Unrest (2026)

Singles from Hard Headed Woman
- 1. "Don't Let the Bastards Get You Down" Released: June 10, 2025; 2. "Losing Streak" Released: August 6, 2025

Hard Headed Woman is the fifth studio album by American country musician Margo Price, released on August 29, 2025, by Loma Vista Recordings. The album was recorded at RCA Studio A with producer Matt Ross-Spang, who co-produced Price's first two albums Midwest Farmer's Daughter (2016) and All American Made (2017). The project contains twelve tracks - ten originals that were all co-written by Price, and covers of Steven Knudson's "Love Me Like You Used to Do", and Waylon Jennings' "Kissing You Goodbye".

It was nominated for the inaugural Grammy Award for Best Traditional Country Album at the 68th Annual Grammy Awards

== Background ==
When Price was conceiving the album, she expressed a desire to return to her classic country roots, having previously expanded into more Americana, and psychedelic rock sounds on her previous albums That's How Rumors Get Started (2020) and Strays (2023). Though her long-time backing band, the Price Tags, were involved in the recording process for Hard Headed Woman, Price parted ways with the group prior to the album's release and put together a new band more suited to a country melodies. Price explained that the album's title was inspired by her need to stand up for justice, stating "I'm a highly-sensitive, highly-feeling person. I have a hard time when I see injustice, not saying anything about it. Singing these songs, and sometimes being the squeaky wheel saying, 'This isn't right,' is hard, because people don't like women. We're living in a time where people are just stripping away women's rights. That is why I wanted this album to be called Hard Headed Woman".

== Singles ==
The first single, "Don't Let the Bastards Get You Down", was released on June 10, 2025, when Price announced the album. The song was co-written with Price's husband and partner Jeremy Ivey and Rodney Crowell, with a posthumous credit to Kris Kristofferson. Price stated that the song was originally written for a film that never ended up being made, and that it was inspired by a widely publicized moment at a Bob Dylan tribute concert at Madison Square Garden in 1992 when the audience booed Irish singer Sinéad O'Connor and Kristofferson reportedly said the phrase to her in an attempt to offer comfort. The title of the song is also taken from Margaret Atwood's novel The Handmaid's Tale.

The second single, "Losing Streak", was released on August 6, 2025, and the song was written with Ivey. The song is about "[her] early years coming up in Nashville. It is a coming-of-age story inspired by struggle, substances and the search for the perfect song."

== Promotion ==
Price will embark on a tour between the United Kingdom, Europe, and the United States, from June to October 2025, promoting Hard Headed Woman. The tour will feature an all-new backing band for Price.

== Track listing ==
Hard Headed Woman track listing
No.	Title	Writer(s)	Length
1.	"Prelude (Hard Headed Woman)"	Margo Price	0:52
2.	"Don't Let the Bastards Get You Down"	Price; Rodney Crowell; Jeremy Ivey; Kris Kristofferson	2:51
3.	"Red Eye Flight"	Price; Crowell; Ivey	3:12
4.	"Don't Wake Me Up" (featuring Jesse Welles)	Price; Ivey	4:13
5.	"Close to You"	Price; Ivey	3:53
6.	"Nowhere Is Where"	Price; Ivey; Morgan Nagler	3:32
7.	"Losing Streak"	Price; Ivey	4:09
8.	"I Just Don't Give a Damn"	George Jones; Jimmy Peppers	3:50
9.	"Keep a Picture"	Price; Ivey	3:18
10.	"Love Me Like You Used to Do" (featuring Tyler Childers)	Steven Knudson	4:27
11.	"Wild at Heart"	Price; Ivey	3:08
12.	"Kissing You Goodbye"	Waylon Jennings	2:47
Total length:			40:17

== Personnel ==
Credits adapted from Tidal.

- Margo Price – vocals (all tracks), acoustic guitar (tracks 1, 5, 11, 12), background vocals (2, 9, 11), percussion (3, 4, 6, 8, 9, 11)
- Matt Ross-Spang – production, mixing, engineering (all tracks); acoustic guitar (2, 3, 11), percussion (2, 11, 12), background vocals (2), electric guitar (8)
- Kim Rosen – mastering
- Bryce Jordan – engineering assistance
- Connor Theriot – engineering assistance
- Phillip Smith – engineering assistance
- Kristin Webber – background vocals (1, 2, 5, 6, 9), fiddle (1)
- Shannon McNally – background vocals (1, 7, 12)
- Alec Newman – bass guitar (2, 3, 7–9, 11, 12), upright bass (4–6, 10)
- Dillon Napier – drums (2–5, 7–12), percussion (2, 4, 5, 7, 9, 11), African percussion (8)
- Jamie Davis – electric guitar (2–5, 7–12)
- Russ Pahl – pedal steel guitar (2, 3, 5, 8, 9, 12), electric guitar (4, 7, 12), acoustic guitar (7)
- Logan Ledger – background vocals (2, 3, 11)
- Rodney Crowell – background vocals (2, 3)
- Jeremy Ivey – acoustic guitar (3, 4, 6–9, 11, 12), piano (5, 9), organ (5), background vocals (6, 9)
- Jesse Welles – background vocals (4)
- Billy Contreras – fiddle (6, 9, 11)
- Chuck Leavell – organ, piano (7)
- Kirk Smothers – baritone saxophone (8)
- Art Edmainston – tenor saxophone (8)
- Marc Franklin – trumpet (8)
- Tyler Childers – vocals (10)

== Charts ==
Chart performance for Hard Headed Woman
Chart (2025)	Peak position
Scottish Albums (Official Charts)	80
UK Albums Sales (OCC)	58
UK Americana Albums (Official Charts)	10
UK Country Albums (Official Charts)	1
US Top Album Sales (Billboard)	37
