= Among the Ghosts =

Studio album by Lucero
- Released: August 3, 2018
- Studio: Phillips Recording
- Genres: Alternative country; indie rock
- Length: 40:54

Lucero chronology
All a Man Should Do (2015)	Among the Ghosts (2018)	When You Found Me (2021)

Professional ratings
Aggregate scores
Source	Rating
Metacritic	77/100
Review scores
Source	Rating
AllMusic	4/5 stars
American Songwriter	4/5 stars
Paste	7.4/10

Among the Ghosts is the tenth studio album by American country-punk band Lucero. It was released August 3, 2018 under Thirty Tigers.

== Production ==
The album was recorded live at Phillips Recording with producer Matt Ross-Spang. American actor Michael Shannon features on "Back to the Night". The track "Loving" features on the 2016 film, Loving

== Critical reception ==
Among the Ghosts was met with "generally favorable" reviews from critics. At Metacritic, which assigns a weighted average rating out of 100 to reviews from mainstream publications, this release received an average score of 77, based on 7 reviews. Aggregator Album of the Year gave the release a 74 out of 100 based on a critical consensus of 4 reviews.

Mark Deming of AllMusic said the album "demonstrates how smart and versatile these guys can be; it's a brave and satisfying set that finds beauty and meaning in the valleys on the human experience." Eric Danton from Paste said of the album: "The songs are full of minor-key acoustic guitars, moody electric flourishes and downhearted piano parts, augmented here and there with overdriven, but restrained, riffs."

=== Accolades ===
Accolades for Among the Ghosts
Publication	Accolade	Rank
American Songwriter	American Songwriter's Top 25 Albums of the Year	16

== Track listing ==
Among the Ghosts track listing
No.	Title	Length
1.	"Among the Ghosts"	4:06
2.	"Bottom of the Sea"	5:01
3.	"Everything Has Changed"	5:16
4.	"Always Been You"	4:12
5.	"Cover Me"	4:11
6.	"To My Dearest Wife"	3:49
7.	"Long Way Back Home"	4:16
8.	"Loving"	2:58
9.	"Back to the Night" (featuring Michael Shannon)	4:12
10.	"For the Lonely Ones"	2:53

== Personnel ==
Musicians

- Ben Nichols – vocals, guitar
- Rick Steff – piano
- John C. Stubblefield – bass
- Brian Venable – guitar
- Roy Berry – drums
- Eugenio Figueroa – viola
- Heather Trussell – violin
- Gaylon Patterson – violin
- Dara Hankins – cello
- Jim Spake – saxophone
- Michael Shannon – vocals

Production

- Matt Ross-Spang – engineer, mixing, producer
- Wesley Graham – engineer
- Jeff Powell – mastering
- Alex McCollough – mastering
- Matthew Cole – design

== Charts ==
Chart performance for Among the Ghosts
Chart (2018)	Peak position
US Top Alternative Albums (Billboard)	9
US Top Folk Albums (Billboard)	2
US Top Rock Albums (Billboard)	18
US Top Tastemaker Albums (Billboard	2
