= When You Found Me =

Studio album by Lucero
- Released: January 29, 2021
- Studio: Phillips Recording, Memphis, Tennessee
- Genre: Alternative country; indie rock
- Length: 41:19
- Label: Liberty & Lament; Thirty Tigers
- Producer: Matt Ross-Spang

Lucero chronology
Among the Ghosts (2018)	When You Found Me (2021)

Professional ratings
Aggregate scores
Source	Rating
Metacritic	75/100
Review scores
Source	Rating
AllMusic	4/5 stars
Classic Rock	4/5 stars
Slant Magazine	2/5 stars

When You Found Me is the eleventh studio album by American country-rock band Lucero. It was released on January 29, 2021, through Liberty & Lament and Thirty Tigers.

== Background ==
The album was recorded in the summer of 2020 at Phillips Recording in Memphis, Tennessee, with producer Matt Ross-Spang.

== Critical reception ==
When You Found Me was met with "generally favorable" reviews from critics. At Metacritic, which assigns a weighted average rating out of 100 to reviews from mainstream publications, this release received an average score of 75 based on 5 reviews.

Writing for AllMusic, Mark Deming wrote: "Nearly all the songs on When You Found Me trade in uncertainty and doubt, in human relationships that could seemingly fall apart at any moment, and the dramatic tension in Ben Nichols' vocals fits the slow-burning fuse of the music like bourbon and Coca-Cola. Lucero don't make the edgy doubt of these songs sound comfortable, but they do make them sound vivid and real." At Glide Magazine, John Moore said: "The band’s moody, at times Southern Gothic sound, is still tightly wrapped around the songs here, but there is also a feeling of nostalgia. Musically, the band is stripped down more so than they have been in a while on When You Found Me. And despite the pared down horn section, they used vintage synthesizers on certain songs, a first for the band, and managed to find some space for fiddles here and there." Essi Berelian of Classic Rock explained: "When You Found Me combines top-notch musicianship and expert songcraft with bags of brooding atmosphere, with Lucero clearly at the top of their southern-rocking game."

== Track listing ==
When You Found Me track listing
No.	Title	Length
1.	"Have You Lost Your Way?"	3:15
2.	"Outrun the Moon"	4:58
3.	"Coffin Nails"	3:02
4.	"Pull Me Close Don't Let Go"	4:20
5.	"Good as Gone"	4:10
6.	"All My Life"	4:11
7.	"The Match"	4:08
8.	"Back in Ohio"	3:43
9.	"A City on Fire"	4:55
10.	"When You Found Me"	4:37
Total length:		41:19

== Personnel ==
Credits adapted from AllMusic.

Band Members

- Ben Nichols – lead vocals, guitar
- John C. Stubblefield – bass
- Brian Venable – guitar
- Roy Berry − drums
- Rick Steff – piano

Other musicians

- Jim Spake – saxophone

Production

- Matt Ross-Spang, engineer, mixing, producer
- Pete Lyman – mastering
- Jeff Powell – mastering
- Matthew Cole – design
