= Hard Headed Woman (disambiguation) =

"Hard Headed Woman" is a rock and roll song recorded by Elvis Presley.

Hard Headed Woman may also refer to:

- Hard Headed Woman (album), 2025 album by Margo Price
- "Hard Headed Woman", a 1970 song from Tea for the Tillerman
