= Tim Z. Hernandez =

American writer, scholar, and performer

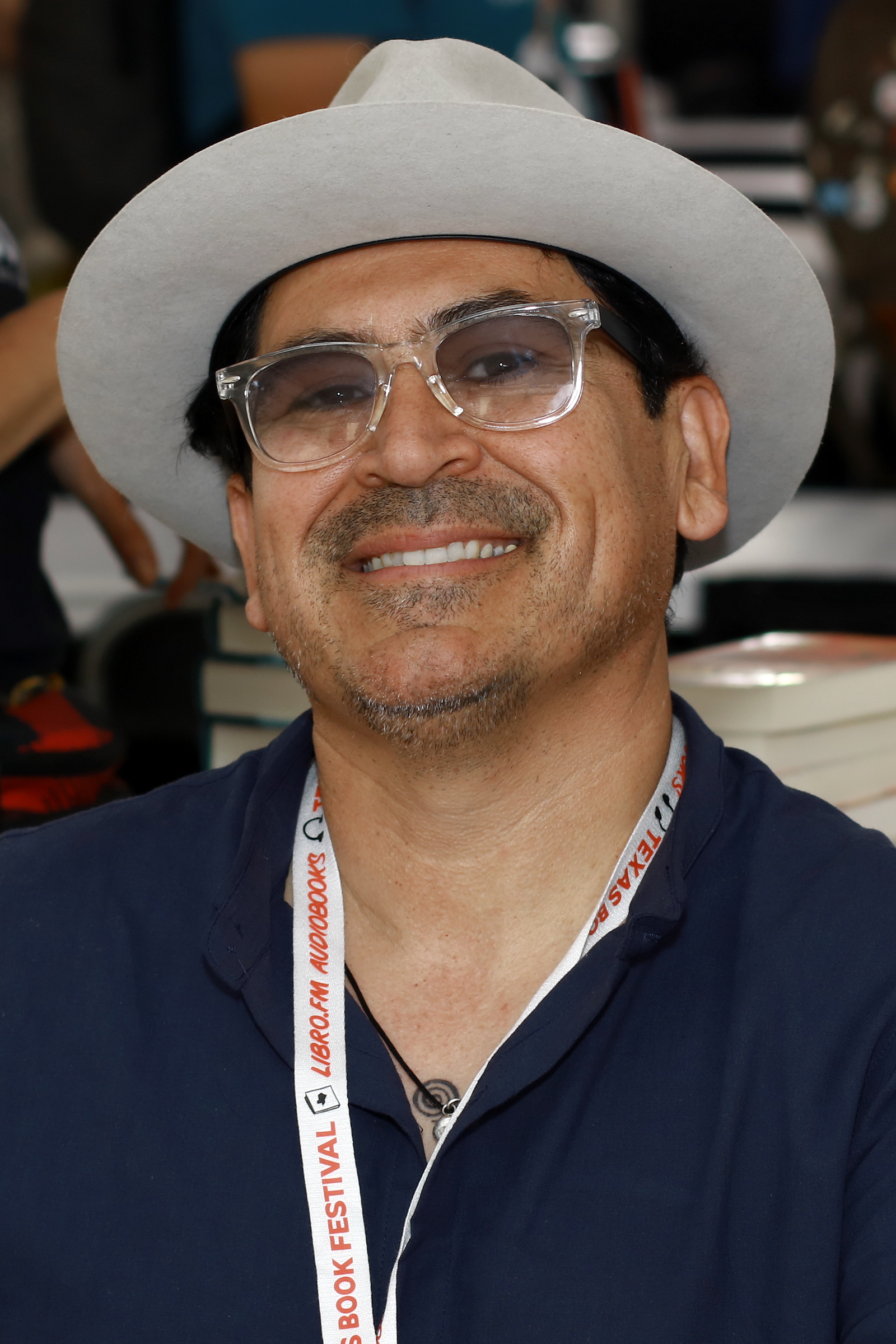
- Hernandez at the 2024 Texas Book Festival
- Born: Dinuba, California, U.S.
- Education: Naropa University; Bennington College
- Occupations: Writer; Performer; Multidisciplinary Artist
- Writing career
- Notable works: All They Will Call You; They Call You Back; Mañana Means Heaven; Skin Tax; Some of the Light
- Notable awards: American Book Award; Luis Leal Award; Int'l Latino Book Award; Colorado Book Award
- Website: Tim Z. Hernandez website

Tim Z. Hernandez is an American writer, performer, multi-disciplinary artist, and documentary filmmaker. His first poetry collection, Skin Tax (2004), received the 2006 American Book Award, and his debut novel, Breathing, in Dust (2010), was awarded the 2010 Premio Aztlán Literary Prize, and was a finalist for the California Book Award. In 2011, Hernandez was named one of sixteen New American Poets by the Poetry Society of America. In 2014, he received the Colorado Book Award for his poetry collection, Natural Takeover of Small Things, and the 2014 International Latino Book Award for his historical fiction novel, Mañana Means Heaven. In 2018, he received the Luis Leal Award for Distinction in Chicano Letters administered by UC Santa Barbara, and in 2019 he was inducted into the Texas Institute of Letters.

Hernandez's research of the 1948 Los Gatos DC-3 crash near Los Gatos, California, which killed 32 people, resulted in his successful campaign to install a monument at the mass grave site in 2013, and at the crash site in 2024. In 2017, he published the book, All They Will Call You, and in 2024, They Call You Back, based on the crash and the subsequent investigation. Hernandez was one of four finalists for the inaugural Freedom Plow Award from the Split This Rock Foundation for his work on locating the victims of the plane wreck at Los Gatos.

== Early life ==
Hernandez was raised in California's San Joaquin Valley, where he lived in farm-worker communities in the agricultural region. His family roots are in Texas, New Mexico, and East Los Angeles. Early in his life, Hernandez's parents were migrant farmworkers, following the seasons across the southwest. It was during this time on the road that he developed an interest in travel and stories.

Throughout his life, Hernandez has been a student of acting, visual arts, music, and writing. As a teenager, he focused mainly on painting. In 1999, he apprenticed with Bay Area muralist Juana Alicia on a traditional fresco mural at San Francisco International Airport.

In the mid-1990s, Hernandez was mentored by poet Juan Felipe Herrera, and began studying writing, performance art, and theater under his tutelage. While at CSU Long Beach he also studied with poets June Jordan and Li-Young Lee and performance artists such as Guillermo Gómez-Peña and Commedia dell'arte.

He earned his B.A. degree in writing and literature from the first accredited Buddhist institute in the west, Naropa University. He holds an M.F.A. in writing and literature from Bennington College in Vermont. He is currently an associate professor at the University of Texas at El Paso's bilingual M.F.A. creative writing program.

== Career ==
Hernandez's performances have been featured at the Getty Center, Denver Center for the Performing Arts, Dixon Experimental Theater in NYC, the Loft Literary Center, Intersection for the Arts, Stanford University, and at the Jack Kerouac School, among other venues. In 2000 he was commissioned by the United Way of Greater Los Angeles and the National Fanny Mae Foundation to write and perform an original one-man show on homelessness and poverty. From 2006 through 2018 he worked with Poets & Writers Inc. and the California Center for the Book at UCLA, offering writing workshops to communities across California.

In March 2013, NPR interviewed Hernandez, in regards to a new rendition of the song Deportee (Plane Wreck at Los Gatos). With the help of Lance Canales, the two released a version of the song that included Hernandez reciting the names of those who perished in the 1948 Los Gatos plane crash. After more than a decade of research, Hernandez single-handedly uncovered the identities of many of the people. As stated by Hernandez, within this interview,

It all comes down to the same idea of why it matters that their names are even brought up. You know, here we are, 65 years later. I mean, at the end of the day - Our names are really what represent who we are. They're our stamp on the fact that we've existed here, at one point.

Later in 2013, Hernandez's research of the 1948 Los Gatos plane crash culminated in his successful drive to provide a proper monument at the mass grave of the 28 migrant farmworkers who perished nearly nameless, which had inspired the song Deportee (Plane Wreck at Los Gatos). He has since published a related non-fiction book, All They Will Call You.

== Awards ==
- 2025 International Latino Book Award for Nonfiction, "They Call You Back"
- 2025 Memoir Book Prize
- 2026 Tillie Olsen Prize for Social Justice Writing, Nonfiction
- 2019 Texas Institute of Letters Inductee
- 2018 Recognition by the California State Senate for his research and recovery work on the 1948 plane crash at Los Gatos
- 2018 Luis Leal Award, UC Santa Barbara for his work on historical recovery
- 2014 Colorado Book Award, Poetry for "Natural Takeover of Small Things"
- 2014 International Latino Book Award, Historical Fiction for "Mañana Means Heaven"
- 2013 Split this Rock Freedom Plow Award for Poetry & Activism, Finalist
- 2011 New American Poets honor, Poetry Society of America
- 2011 El Premio Aztlan Literary Prize for Breathing, In Dust
- 2006 American Book Award for Skin Tax
- 2006 Zora Neal Hurston Award for Skin Tax
- 2003 James Duval Phelan Award, San Francisco Foundation, "Skin Tax"
- 2010 California Book Award Finalist, "Breathing, In Dust"

== Works ==
Non-Fiction

- They Call You Back (Memoir, 2024)
- All They Will Call You (Documentary Novel, 2017)

Fiction

- Mañana Means Heaven (Historical Fiction, 2013)
- Breathing, In Dust (Fiction, 2010)

=== Poetry ===
- Brave River (Poetry & Photos, Mouthfeel Press, 2026)
- Some of the Light: New & Selected Poems (Beacon Press, 2023)
- Natural Takeover of Small Things (Poetry, 2013)
- Skin Tax. (Berkeley: Heyday Books. October 2004. ISBN 978-1-890771-93-5.)
- Culture of Flow, (Monkey Puzzle Press, 2012)

=== Audio CD ===
- Chile Con Karma: A Brown Lotus Project (Audio CD, recorded at Naropa University studios, 2007) Out of print.
- The Central Chakrah Project: A Spoken Word Cura, (Audio CD, 2000) Out of print.

=== Anthologies (partial listing) ===
- New California Voices, Heyday Books. ISBN 978-1-59714-067-6.
- The Devil's Punchbowl, Red Hen Press, 2010
- Stan Yogi; Gayle Mak; Patricia Wakida, eds. (2007). Highway 99: A Literary Journey Through California's Great Central Valley. Great Valley Books/Heyday Books. ISBN 978-1-59714-067-6.
- Border Senses (Border Senses Press)
- Wet: A Journal of Proper Bathing (University of Miami)
- Black Renaissance Noire (NYU)
- Many Mountains Moving (MMM Press)
- Undocumented: In the Gardens & the Margins (Baksun Books)
- Symposium (Baobab Tree Press)
- Square One (Colorado University)
- Mosaic Voices Anthology (Poppy Lane Publishing)
- Ram’s Tale Anthology ( Fresno City College)
- Flies, Cockroaches, and Poets Anthology ’02 (Chicano Writers & Artists Association)
