= Lucero (band) =

American rock band

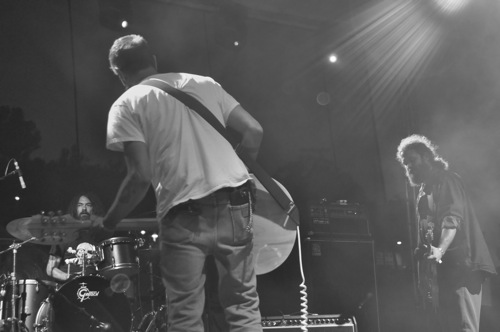
- Lucero in concert

Background information
- Origin: Memphis, Tennessee, United States
- Genres: Alternative country; alternative rock; country punk; heartland rock; Memphis soul; blues rock
- Years active: 1998–present
- Labels: Universal (2008–2010); Liberty & Lament; Madjack Records; Soul is Cheap; Love Lost; Thick Syrup; Landmark Records; Ato; Loose Music; MapleMusic (Canada)
- Members: Ben Nichols; Brian Venable; John C. Stubblefield; Roy Berry; Rick Steff
- Past members: Jeremy Freeze; Reiko; Steve Selvidge; Todd Gill; Todd Beene
- Website: luceromusic.com

Lucero is an American country-punk/alternative country/alternative rock band based in Memphis, Tennessee, United States. Lucero's sound has been described as a "synthesis of soul, rock, and country [that] is distinctly Memphisian." They have released 12 albums and one live DVD, mostly through their own label. The band mainly tours around North America.

== Biography ==
=== 1998–2007: Formation and early years ===
Lucero had their start in Memphis, Tennessee, and played for the first time in early 1998. Since then, they have been called "one of the hardest working bands of the last 10 years—on tour significantly more days than they are not."

=== 2000: The Attic Tapes ===
The Attic Tapes was recorded in 2000 at guitarist Brian Venable's dad's attic. It was recorded straight to an 8 track cassette and was self-released. This album was later reissued in 2006 by Liberty & Lament. It includes the cover of the Jawbreaker song, “Kiss The Bottle.”

=== 2001: Lucero ===
The eponymous album was recorded by Empty Road Music in 2000 and Includes such popular tracks as "Little Silver Heart", “My Best Girl”, “Raising Hell”, “Drink 'til We’re Gone” & “All Sewn Up.”

=== 2002: Tennessee ===
Tennessee, recorded in 2001 by Madjack Records, is one of Lucero’s most beloved albums among fans. The thirteen-track album includes songs such as “Sweet Little Thing,” “Nights Like These,” “The Last Song,” and “Here at the Starlite.”

=== 2003: That Much Further West ===
"That Much Further West" was recorded in 2003 by Tiger Style Records with 12 tracks. Guitarist Brian Venable took a break from the band so Todd Gill filled in on guitar for this record. The record includes popular songs such as "That Much Further West", "Across the River", "Tonight Ain't Gonna Be Good" & a fan favorite "Tears Don't Matter Much."

=== 2005: Nobody's Darlings ===
Nobody's Darlings was released in 2005 & recorded by Liberty & Lament Records. It's a twelve-track record that includes such tracks as “Bikeriders”, “Last Night In Town” & “The War.” "Bikeriders" is based on the book "The Bikeriders" by author Danny Lyon. “The War” is about Ben Nichols grandfather & what he went through during his time serving in the army in Europe during World War II.

=== 2006: Rebels, Rogues & Sworn Brothers ===
"Rebels, Rogues & Sworn Brothers" was recorded in 2006 by Liberty & Lament. This is a twelve-song album that includes such tracks as “What Else Would You Have Me Be?”, “I Don’t Wanna Be the One”, “I Can Get Us Out of Here”, “1979”, & “She’s Just That Kinda Girl.”

=== 2007: Shotgun Stories ===
Ben Nichols and Lucero created music for the soundtrack of Shotgun Stories, the first film by Ben Nichols's brother Jeff Nichols, released in 2007.

=== 2008–2009: 1372 Overton Park ===
In late 2008, the band announced they had signed a four-album deal with Universal Music Group, though the relationship with Universal was short-lived. 1372 Overton Park was released October 6, 2009, by Universal Music Group and was the first Lucero album to feature a horn section.

=== 2012: Women & Work ===
Lucero's album, Women & Work, was released on March 13, 2012, by ATO Records. This album integrates more of the horn section as well as the pedal steel guitar, keyboards and a gospel chorus.

=== 2013: Texas & Tennessee EP ===
This four song EP was released in the spring of 2013 by ATO Records. It includes the songs; “Texas & Tennessee”, “Union Pacific Line”, “Breathless Love” & “The Other Side of Lonesome.”

=== 2015: All a Man Should Do ===
Lucero's ninth album, All a Man Should Do, was released on September 18, 2015. It continued the Memphis-soul influence as seen in the previous two albums. The album included a cover of I'm In Love With A Girl, originally recorded by fellow Memphis band, Big Star. The cover, which includes a line taken for the album title, featured backing vocals from Big Star drummer, Jody Stephens. It was recorded in Ardent Studios which is based in Memphis and managed by Stephens.

=== 2018: Among the Ghosts ===
Among the Ghosts was released August 3, 2018. The album was produced by Matt Ross-Spang and recorded live in a single room at Sam Phillips Recording in Memphis. The sound is more stripped back than the previous three, with no brass section. The track "Back to the Night" features spoken word lyrics from actor Michael Shannon. Shannon is a frequent collaborator of frontman Ben Nichols brother, film director Jeff Nichols. The song Loving, had previously featured on the soundtrack to Jeff Nichols film, Loving, as a solo Ben Nichols song.

2019 saw Lucero undertake their first ever Australian headlining tour.

=== 2021: When You Found Me ===
On October 23, 2020, Lucero announced the release of their eleventh album, When You Found Me, alongside the launch of a video for the song Outrun The Moon. When You Found Me was released on January 29, 2021. Like their previous album, Among the Ghosts, When You Found Me was produced by Matt Ross-Spang, recorded at Sam Phillip's Recording and released on their own label, Liberty & Lament. Rolling Stone states that the album "continues the darker trend started by Among the Ghosts and feels more intimate than raucous, horn-driven Lucero records like Women & Work and 1372 Overton Park" and that it "updates Lucero’s sound in interesting ways with the addition of synthesizers".

=== 2023: Should've Learned By Now ===
Lucero released their 12th album, Should've Learned By Now on 24th, February 2023. As in their previous two, this album was produced by Matt Ross-Sprang. It is noted for having more upbeat, fun songs that did not suit the darker tone of the previous two.

Pitchfork gave the album a score of 7.5, saying that "what really distinguishes Should’ve Learned by Now from their previous barroom musings is the humor in these songs", while also highlighting drummer, Roy Berry, stating that he's "still one of the most inventive drummers around". Paste Magazine gave it a score of 7.1, saying that the album is "a marriage between the band's surging early angst and latter-day introspection."

== Liberty & Lament ==
Liberty & Lament is Lucero's own record label. The label is a part of the EastWest Records family of labels.

== Collaborations and other projects ==
The first solo release from frontman Ben Nichols, The Last Pale Light in the West, was released in January 2009 on Lucero's label Liberty & Lament. On November 17, 2013, the title song was featured in the episode "Live Bait" of the AMC series The Walking Dead. The seven-song record was inspired by Cormac McCarthy's book Blood Meridian and recorded with Rick Steff on piano and accordion and Todd Beane on pedal steel.

Nichols released his second solo record, In the Heart of the Mountain, on July 25 2025. The album features Cory Branan on electric guitar, Todd Beene on pedal steel, and Morgan Eve Swain on violin.

In May 2009, Nichols co-starred in MTV's $5 Cover, a Craig Brewer-produced, quasi-fictionalized series about the Memphis music scene. A performance of Lucero's song "San Francisco" at the Young Avenue Deli in Memphis was featured in the trailer for the series.

Ben Nichols's previous band was Red 40 in which he played alongside Colin Brooks and Steve Kooms.

Drummer Roy Berry is half of experimental duo Overjoid and was a member of the Memphis-based band The Simple Ones before joining Lucero.

John Stubblefield has recorded with Jello 1-2-3, North Mississippi Allstars, Jim Dickinson and BigAssTruck (Sack Lunch EP), among others. He co-produced Hill Country Revue's 2010 album Zebra Ranch.

Rick Steff has recorded with Cat Power, Hank Williams Jr., and Dexy's Midnight Runners, among others.

Todd Beene is also currently a member of the Tennessee band Glossary and Chuck Ragan's band.

== Band members ==
=== Current ===
- Ben Nichols – vocals, guitar
- Roy Berry – drums
- John C. Stubblefield – bass
- Rick Steff – piano, organ, accordion
- Brian Venable – guitar

=== Past ===
- Jeremy Freeze
- Reiko
- Steve Selvidge – guitar (2003)
- John Murry – guitar (2003)
- Todd Gill – guitar (2003–2004)
- Todd Beene

== Discography ==
=== Studio albums ===
- The Attic Tapes (2000)
- Lucero (2001)
- Tennessee (2002)
- That Much Further West (2003)
- Nobody's Darlings (2005)
- Rebels, Rogues & Sworn Brothers (2006)
- 1372 Overton Park (2009)
- Women & Work (2012)
- All a Man Should Do (2015)
- Among the Ghosts (2018)
- When You Found Me (2021)
- Should've Learned by Now (2023)

=== Live albums ===
- Lucero: Live at Cat's Cradle (2004)
- Dreaming in America (2005)
- Lucero: Live from Atlanta (2014)
- Lucero: Live from Red Rocks (2021)
- Lucero Unplugged (2025)

=== Other ===
- Lucero (Demo) (1998)
- Eight Paces to Jackson (Soundtrack) (2000)
- Texas & Tennessee (EP) (2013)
- Before the Ghosts: Acoustic Demos and Other Ideas from Among the Ghosts (2019)

=== Singles ===
- "My Best Girl" (2000)
- "Loggia Split" (2004)
- "Tell Me What It Takes" (2007 – from The Road Mix: Music from the Television Series One Tree Hill)
- "Smoke" (2009)
- "Mom" (2009)
- "Stormy Eyed Valentine" (2017)
- "My Name Is Izzy" (2019) ("Hello My Name Is Izzy" & "'84 300zx" [with T-Tops])
- "Time to Go Home" (2020)
- "Macon If We Make It" (2023)

== Videography ==
- "Bright Stars on Lonesome Nights"
- "Dreaming in America"
- "Punks in Vegas Sessions"

== Mud soundtrack ==
Lucero contributed two tracks, "Everything You Need" and "Take You Away", to the 2012 film Mud, which was written and directed by Ben Nichols' brother Jeff Nichols. Ben Nichols contributed three additional tracks, "Davy Brown", "The Kid" and "Snakebite" to the soundtrack.

== Hellion soundtrack ==
Lucero contributed the tracks, "When I Was Young" and "The Other Side of Lonesome", to the 2014 film Hellion.

== Stronger soundtrack ==
Lucero contributed the track "On My Way Downtown" to the 2017 film Stronger.
