= 1948 Los Gatos DC-3 crash =

Plane crash near Coalinga, California, US

Los Gatos Canyon Crash
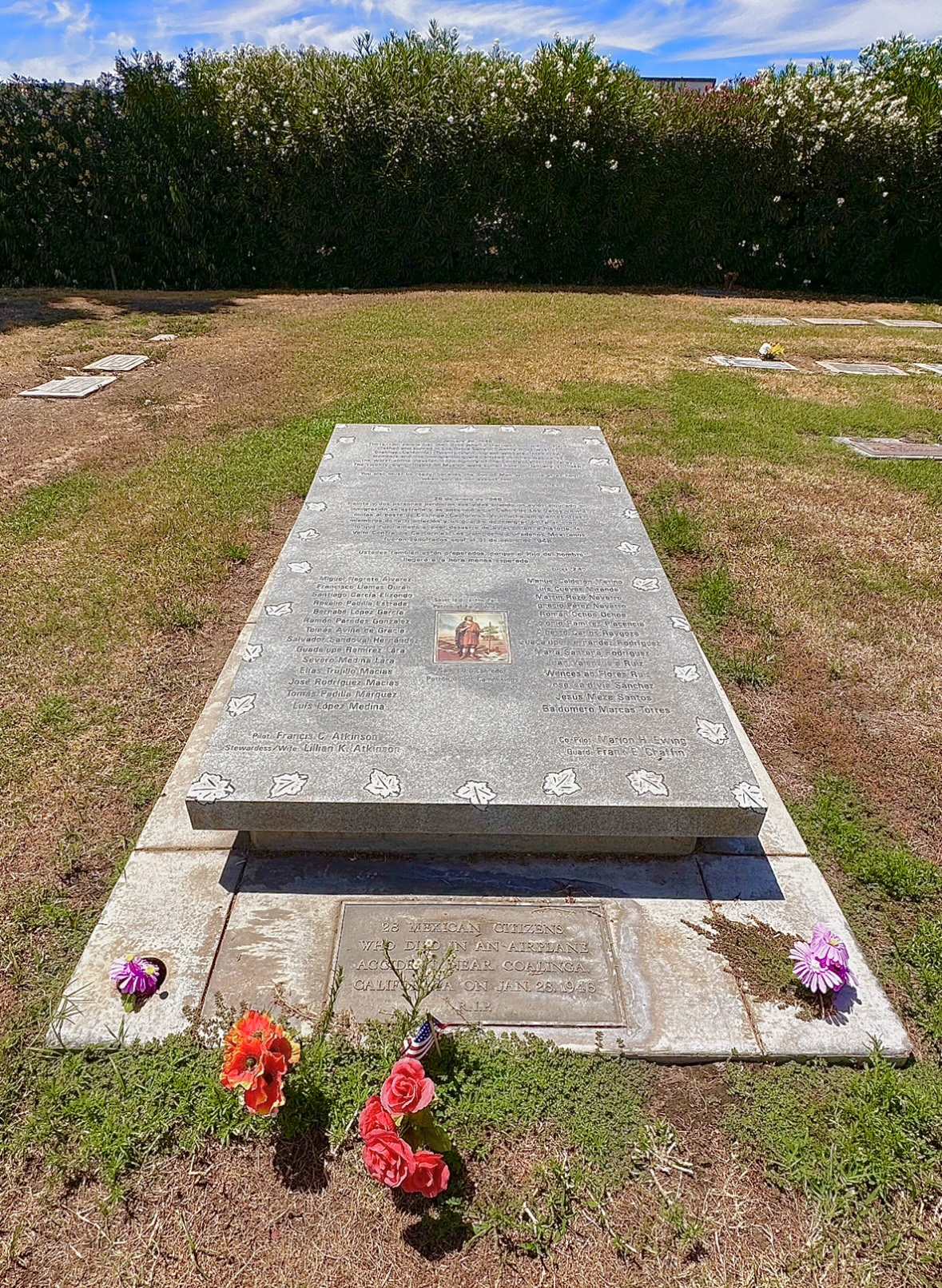
- Burial site for the victims of the 1948 Los Gatos Canyon plane crash at Fresno Holy Cross Cemetery

Accident
- Date: January 28, 1948
- Summary: Fire, originating in the left engine-driven fuel pump
- Site: Diablo mountains, west of Coalinga, California, United States; 36.2366°N 120.5849°W

Aircraft
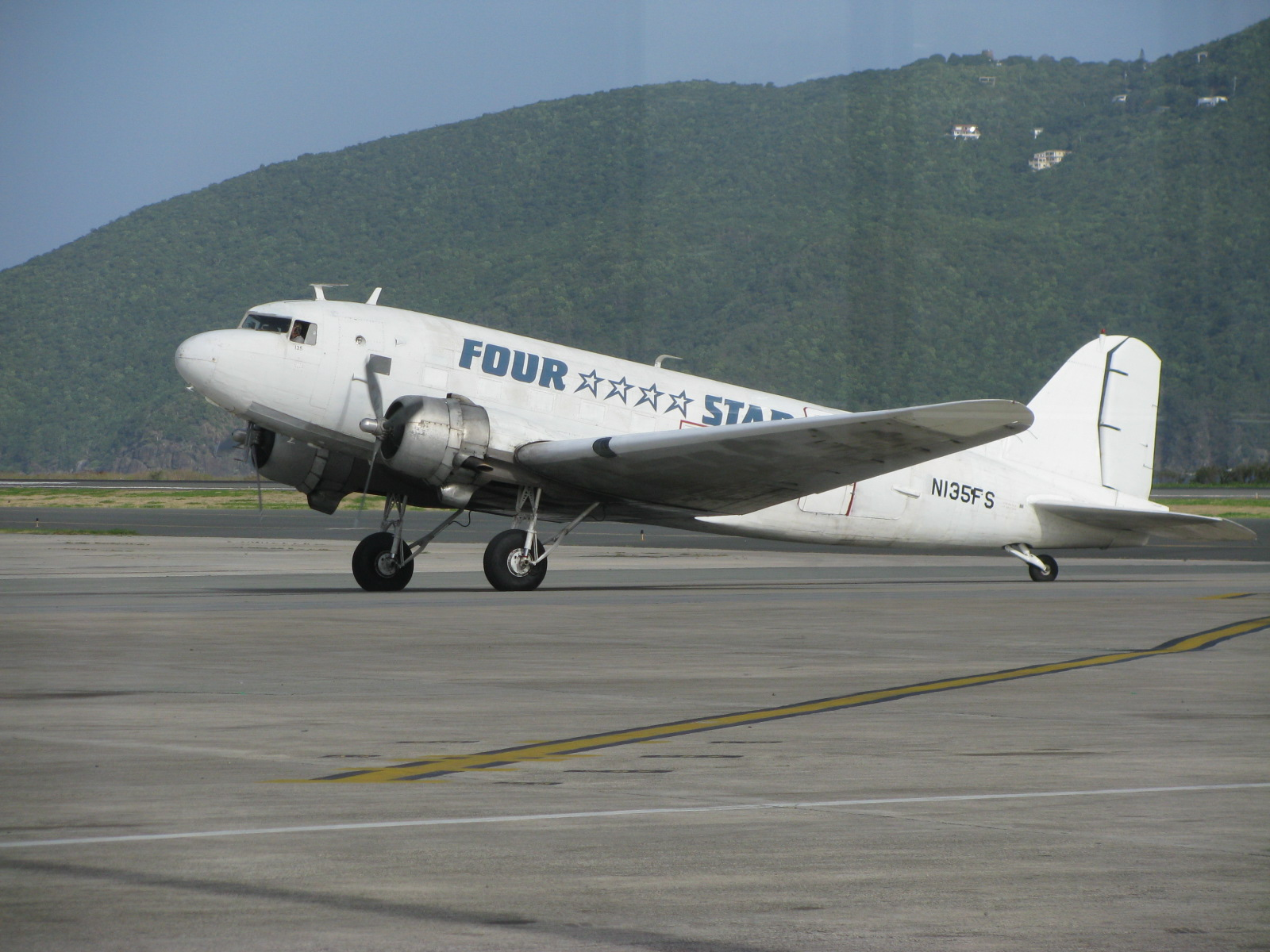
- A DC-3 similar to the accident aircraft
- Aircraft type: C-47B-40-DK Skytrain
- Operator: Airline Transport Carriers (under INS contract)
- Registration: NC36480
- Flight origin: Oakland, California
- Stopover: Burbank, California
- Destination: El Centro, California
- Occupants: 32
- Passengers: 29
- Crew: 3
- Fatalities: 32
- Survivors: 0

On January 28, 1948, a DC-3 aircraft operated by Airline Transport Carriers with 32 persons on board, mostly Mexican farm laborers, including some from the bracero guest worker program, crashed in the Diablo Range, 20 miles west of Coalinga, California, killing all passengers and crew. The crash inspired the song "Deportee" by Woody Guthrie.

Some of the passengers were being returned to Mexico at the termination of their bracero contracts, while others were undocumented immigrants being deported. Initial news reports listed only the pilot, first officer, stewardess, and an INS guard, with the remainder listed only as "deportees." Only 12 of the victims were initially identified. The Mexican victims of the accident were placed in a mass grave at Holy Cross Cemetery in Fresno, California, with their grave marked only as "Mexican Nationals".

== Accident ==
The Douglas DC-3 aircraft, operated by Airline Transport Carriers, an airline based in Burbank, California, was chartered by the Immigration and Naturalization Service to fly twenty-eight Mexican citizens, who were being deported to the INS Deportation Center in El Centro, California.

For reasons never explained, pilot Frank Atkinson and co-pilot Marion Ewing took a DC-3 that had seats for only twenty-six passengers (seven hours overdue for a routine and required safety inspection) for the flight, instead of an aircraft certified to carry thirty-two passengers. Arriving in Oakland, California, after a routine flight, the crew was joined by INS guard Frank Chaffin. The flight was to refuel at Burbank, California, before continuing to El Centro.

At approximately 10:30am, workers at the Fresno County Industrial Road Camp, located 21 mi (34 km) northwest of Coalinga, California, noticed the DC-3 trailing white smoke from its port engine. The port wing suddenly ripped off, spilling nine passengers out of the gaping hole in the fuselage. The aircraft caught fire and spiralled to the ground near Los Gatos Creek, exploding in a ball of fire. The investigation by the Civil Aeronautics Board discovered that a fuel leak in the port engine's fuel pump had ignited and the slipstream fanned the flames to a white hot intensity. The ensuing fire, acting like a torch, burned through the wingspar and caused the crash.

Initial news reports listed only the pilot, first officer, stewardess, and the immigration guard, with the remainder listed only as "deportees". Only 12 of the victims were initially identified. The Hispanic victims of the accident were placed in a mass grave at Holy Cross Cemetery in Fresno, California, with their grave marked only as "Mexican Nationals". The grave is 84 by 7 ft (25.6 by 2.1 m) with two rows of caskets and not all of the bodies were buried the first day, but the caskets at the site did have an overnight guard.

== Woody Guthrie song, "Deportee" ==
Singer-songwriter Woody Guthrie wrote a poem in 1948 lamenting the anonymity of the workers killed in the crash, identified only as "deportees" in media reports. When Guthrie's poem was set to music a decade later by college student Martin Hoffman, it became the folk song "Deportee (Plane Wreck at Los Gatos)".

The song was popularized by Pete Seeger, and was subsequently performed by Arlo Guthrie Joan Baez, Judy Collins, Julie Felix, Cisco Houston, Bob Dylan, Willie Nelson, Dolly Parton, Johnny Cash, Bruce Springsteen, Paul Kelly, Martyn Joseph, The Byrds, Richard Shindell, Billy Bragg and Ani DiFranco among others.

== Aftermath ==
Cesar Chavez, later to become founder of the United Farm Workers union, learned of the tragic crash while serving in the US Navy, helping convince him that farm workers should be treated "as important human beings and not as agricultural implements".

The names of all the victims were published in local papers in 1948. In 2009, writer Tim Z. Hernandez began to seek out the gravesite and those names. With the help of others, by July 2013 all had been identified (some of the names were misspelled in the records), and the money raised for a more fitting memorial. On September 2, 2013 (Labor Day), a Deportee Memorial Headstone was unveiled at a mass in the Holy Cross Cemetery in Fresno attended by more than 600. The memorial includes all twenty-eight names of the migrant workers, which included three women, and one man born in Spain, not Mexico as widely reported.
