= Days of Unrest =

Studio album by Margo Price
- Released: July 3, 2026
- Genres: Country; mariachi
- Length: 29:00
- Label: Loma Vista
- Producer: Matt Ross-Spang

Margo Price chronology
Hard Headed Woman (2025)	Days of Unrest (2026)

Singles from Days of Unrest
- 1. "Maggie's Farm" Released: October 14, 2025; 2. "Deportee / Oval Room" Released: June 30, 2026

Days of Unrest is the sixth studio album by the American country musician Margo Price, released on July 3, 2026, by Loma Vista Recordings. Referred to as a "protest mixtape", the album was surprise released by Price prior to a scheduled performance at Willie Nelson's Fourth of July Picnic.

Following up on previous actions like wearing an "ICE Out" pin at the 2026 Grammy Awards as a statement against United States Immigration and Customs Enforcement, the album includes guest vocals by folk singer Joan Baez and country veteran Billy Swan, and music by the band Memphis Mariachi. BrooklynVegan reported that a portion of proceeds from vinyl sales would be donated to the Florence Immigrant & Refugee Rights Project, while Goldmine said the recording "sincerely makes an effort to hear and see the Mexican migrant community in a time of need."

== Track listing ==
Days of Unrest track listing
No.	Title	Writer(s)	Length
1.	"San Marcos"	Margo Price; Jeremy Ivey	2:38
2.	"De Colores" (featuring Memphis Mariachi)	Traditional	2:31
3.	"Deportee (Plane Wreck at Los Gatos)" (featuring Joan Baez and Memphis Mariachi)	Woody Guthrie; Martin Hoffman	4:03
4.	"Oval Room"	Blaze Foley	4:15
5.	"San Marcos Theme"	Price; Ivey	2:14
6.	"Long Haired Country Girl" (featuring Billy Swan)	Charlie Daniels	3:40
7.	"Can’t Stand Still"	Price	3:55
8.	"Maggie's Farm"	Bob Dylan	3:36
9.	"San Marcos el Fin"	Price; Ivey	2:08
Total length:			29:00

== Personnel ==
Credits are adapted from Tidal.

- Margo Price – vocals (all tracks), guitar (tracks 1, 2, 8), acoustic guitar (1, 3, 4), percussion (1, 4), background vocals (6)
- Matt Ross-Spang – production, mixing, engineering (all tracks); percussion (1), electric guitar (6, 7), acoustic guitar (6)
- Kimberly Rosen – mastering
- Jeremy Ivey – harmonica (1, 7), acoustic guitar (3–5, 7); background vocals, keyboards (4); bass guitar, piano (6)
- Alex Muñoz – baritone guitar, pedal steel guitar (1)
- Jamie Davis – acoustic guitar (1)
- Kevin Black – bass guitar (1)
- Dillon Napier – drums (1)
- Andrija Tokic – mixing (1)
- Martin Granados – guitarrón (2, 3), vocals (2)
- Eniel Pineda – trumpet (2, 3)
- Jose Patino – trumpet (2, 3)
- Jose Perez – vihuela (2, 3)
- Alejandro Quijano – violin (2, 3)
- Will Chason – additional engineering (3)
- Joan Baez – vocals (3)
- Logan Ledger – background vocals (4, 8), acoustic guitar (4), guitar (8)
- Alec Newman – bass guitar (4, 8), background vocals (4)
- Sean Thompson – background vocals (4, 8), electric guitar (4), guitar (8)
- Aksel Coe – drums (4, 8), percussion (4)
- Paul Niehaus – pedal steel guitar (4, 8)
- Grant Wilson – engineering assistance (4, 8)
- Billy Swan – background vocals (6)
- Jesse Thompson – Dobro guitar (6)
- Ken Coomer – drums, percussion (6, 7)

== Charts ==
Chart performance for Days of Unrest
Chart (2026)	Peak position
UK Album Downloads (Official Charts)	94
