= Noise For Now =

U.S. non-profit organization

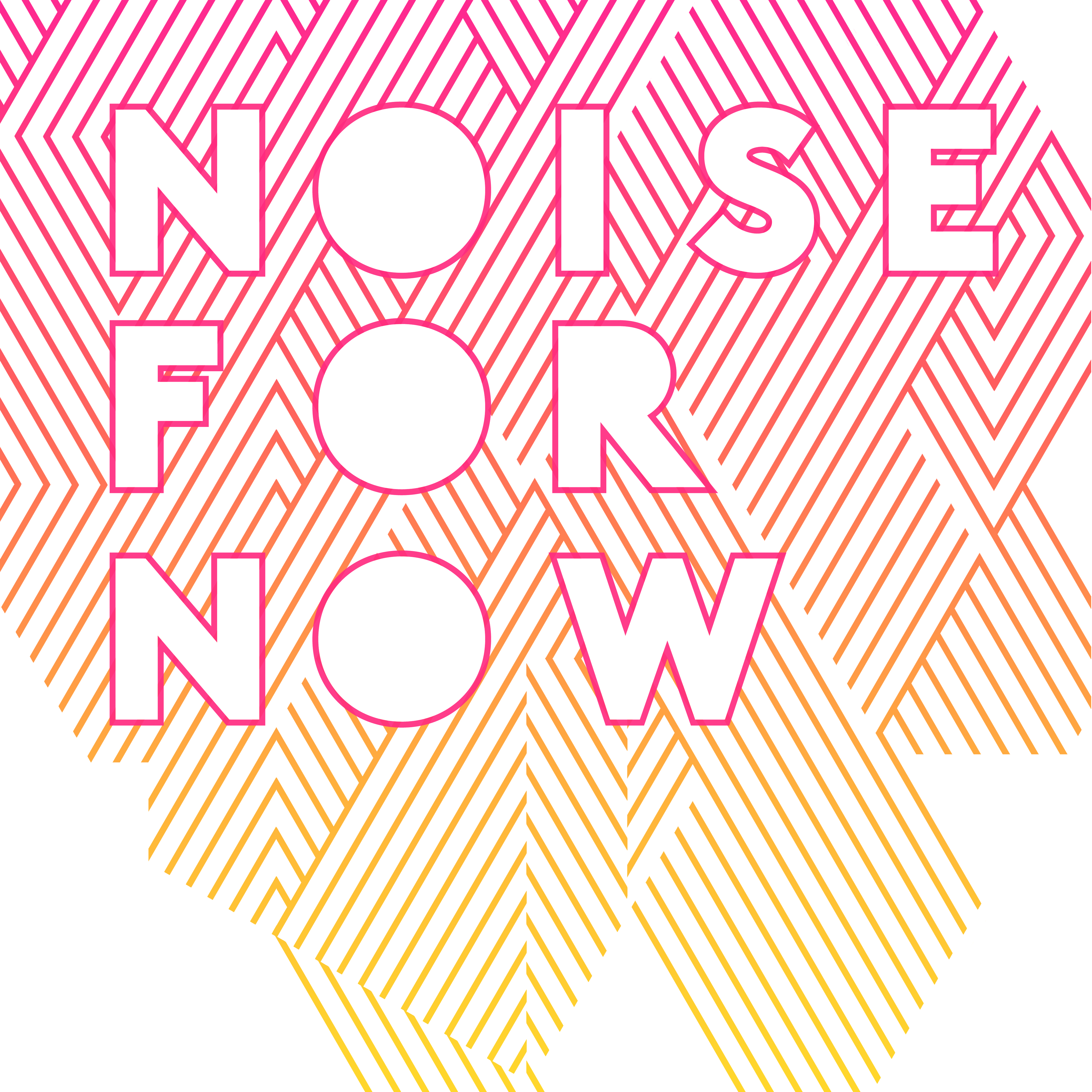
- Formation: 2017
- Legal status: 501(c)(3)
- Headquarters: Santa Fe, New Mexico
- President: Amelia Bauer
- Website: noisefornow.org

Noise for Now (stylized as NOISE FOR NOW) is a nonprofit organization based in Santa Fe, New Mexico, focused on health care, reproductive justice, and women's rights advocacy. The organization, co-founded in 2017 by Amelia Bauer and Samantha Kirby Yoh, works with prominent entertainers to raise awareness and financial support for these causes, as well as for specific health care providers, funds, and education programs.

== Projects ==
=== Benefit concerts ===
In 2017 and 2018, NOISE FOR NOW staged several benefit concerts, featuring the musical acts Grizzly Bear, St. Vincent, TV on the Radio, Bon Iver, and Andrew Bird. In 2022, musician Daniel Rossen performed a live show in Santa Fe, New Mexico, to benefit New Mexico abortion funds. In 2023, NOISE FOR NOW staged a series of three concerts with Ground Control Touring in New York, Chicago, and Los Angeles to raise money for local abortion funds.

=== NFN x Seeding Sovereignty Campaign ===
In 2020, NOISE FOR NOW launched a campaign designed to help mitigate the impact the COVID-19 pandemic has had on Indigenous communities in the United States, through the sale of masks and bandanas. The campaign allowed mask purchasers to donate a mask simultaneously to the Indigenous Impact Community Care Initiative, and a portion of the proceeds also went to the organizations Indigenous Women Rising and the Mariposa Fund for the purposes of facilitating abortion access among Indigenous and undocumented people. NOISE FOR NOW worked with artists and musical acts such as Kim Gordon, Grizzly Bear, Fiona Apple and Cat Power to drive awareness and participation.

=== 1973 Pro Roe Poster and T-shirt Campaign ===
Also in 2020, NOISE FOR NOW designed and sold posters and t-shirts commemorating the landmark 1973 Roe v. Wade decision. Posters could be purchased with the signatures of musicians Karen O, Ad-Rock, Cyndi Lauper, Jenny Lewis, and others. Sales benefitted Planned Parenthood.

=== Our Bodies Deserve Respect Trans Awareness Campaign ===
NOISE FOR NOW worked with the artist Xavier Schipani to create the shirt and tote bag for this campaign. Proceeds went to Texas Health Action’s Kind Clinic, which serves the LGBTQIA+ community with locations across Texas at no cost for all services; and Independent Abortion Clinics with trans-centered programs throughout the US.

=== Abortion Within Reach Campaign ===
In 2022, The Abortion Within Reach campaign published a list of demands drafted by abortion funds for a future in which abortion is within reach for all. These demands are supported by 100 artists, athletes and performers including Ad-Rock, Death Cab For Cutie, Bon Iver, Jane Fonda, Mark Ruffalo, Neko Case, and Margo Price. In honor of Abortion Provider Appreciation Day, Actor Kathryn Hahn interviewed Kwajelyn Jackson, Executive Director of Feminist Women’s Health Center and Oriaku Njoku, Executive Director of Access Reproductive Care Southeast about the state of abortion in Georgia and beyond.

=== Good Music to Ensure Access to Safe Abortion For All Campaign ===
In 2021, NOISE FOR NOW, in partnership with Brilliant Corners Artist Management, Dave Eggers, Like Management, Panache Management, TMWRK, and Q Prime, released Good Music to Ensure Safe Abortion Access to All, a compilation of 49 songs by 49 artists, on Bandcamp. The cover art for the project, "Liberate Abortion" painted in black on a white canvas, was done by Sonic Youth’s Kim Gordon. Headlined by songs from David Byrne and Devo, R.E.M., Tegan and Sara, Soccer Mommy, Sleater-Kinney, Pearl Jam, Maya Hawke, and Fleet Foxes, the release was only available for 24 hours and raised funds for nationwide abortion access and independent abortion clinics.

=== Other Events and Campaigns ===
In 2021, a raffle was held to support Black-led reproductive healthcare clinics and funds. In 2022, NOISE FOR NOW staged several art auctions to support nationwide abortion access and independent abortion clinics. Additionally, NOISE FOR NOW had an art benefit in upstate New York to benefit local abortion funds and Planned Parenthood. NOISE FOR NOW also has an ongoing partnership with Propeller called the Reproductive Freedom Campaign that raises money for the local-level organizations working throughout the US to provide and protect reproductive healthcare and abortion access.
