= Perfectly Imperfect at the Ryman =

Live album by Margo Price
- Released: May 21, 2020
- Recorded: May 19, 20, and 23, 2018
- Venue: Ryman Auditorium
- Genre: Country, Rock
- Length: 53:16
- Label: Loma Vista Recordings
- Producer: Margo Price

Margo Price chronology
All American Made (2017)	Perfectly Imperfect at the Ryman (2020)	That's How Rumors Get Started (2020)

Perfectly Imperfect at the Ryman is a live album by American country musician Margo Price, recorded during her three date residency at the Ryman Auditorium in May 2018. The album was released on May 21, 2020, to celebrate the second anniversary of the residency, and exclusively through Bandcamp to generate donations for the MusiCares COVID-19 Relief Fund.

The album was prepared following the delay of Price's third album, That's How Rumors Get Started, and planned tour in promotion of that album due to the burgeoning COVID-19 pandemic. In promotion of the album and its proceeds for the COVID-19 Relief, Price released a video of the performance of "All American Made" from the concerts.

== Track listing ==
No.	Title	Writer(s)	Length
1.	"A Little Pain Waltz"	Price	3:04
2.	"Weekender (Funk Version)"	Price	4:45
3.	"Wild Women" (featuring Emmylou Harris)	Price	4:07
4.	"I Ain't Living Long Like This" (featuring Sturgill Simpson)	Rodney Crowell	6:11
5.	"Revelations"	Price, Jeremy Ivey	4:13
6.	"Worthless Gold"		4:52
7.	"Hurtin' (On the Bottle) Medley" (included "I Think I'll Just Stay Here and Drink" and "Whiskey River")	Price, Mark Fredson, Ivey, Caitlin Rose	6:02
8.	"Proud Mary"	John Fogerty	4:43
9.	"All American Made"	Price, Ivey	7:46
10.	"Honey, We Can't Afford to Look This Cheap" (featuring Jack White)	Price, White	4:31
11.	"World's Greatest Loser"	Price, Ivey	3:02
