= Arlo McKinley =

American country musician

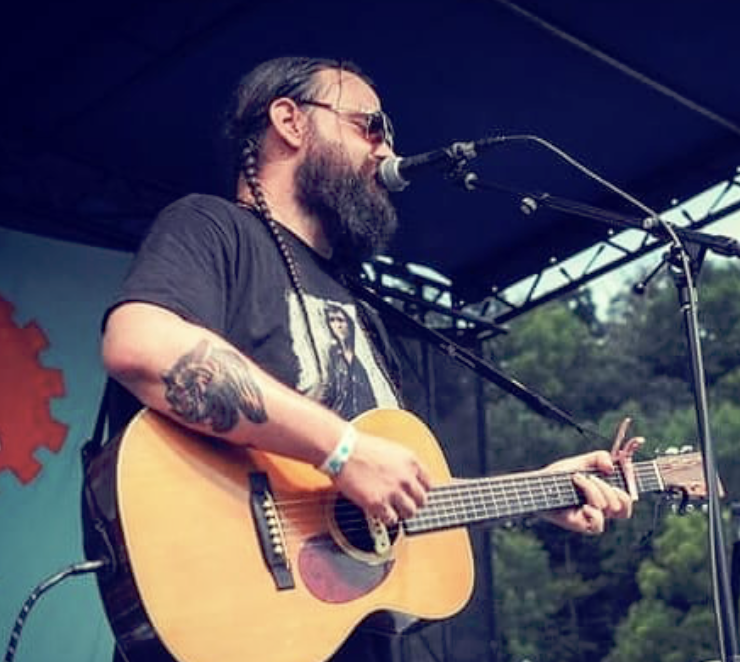
- McKinley performing live in 2018.

Background information
- Born: Timothy Carr; Cincinnati, Ohio, United States
- Genres: Country
- Occupations: Singer, songwriter
- Years active: 2014–present
- Label: Oh Boy

Arlo McKinley is an American country singer and singer/songwriter. He has released three albums, the most recent release being This Mess We're In on John Prine’s record label Oh Boy Records, released July 15, 2022.

== Early life ==
McKinley was born Timothy Carr in Cincinnati, Ohio. At the age of 8, he began singing at his family's church choir, Bethlehem United Baptist.

== Career ==
Arlo McKinley was the last artist signed by John Prine and his son Jody Whelan to the independent record label Oh Boy Records. McKinley has shared stages opening for Tyler Childers, Jason Isbell, Justin Townes Earle, John Moreland, Jamey Johnson and more.

In 2014, McKinley released his first album, titled Arlo McKinley & The Lonesome Sound.

McKinley released his sophomore album, Die Midwestern, as his Oh Boy Records debut on August 14, 2020. He recorded the album at Sam Phillips Recording Studio with Grammy-winning producer Matt Ross-Spang and professional musicians Ken Coomer (Wilco), Rick Steff (Hank Williams Jr.), Reba Russell (Johnny Cash), Will Sexton, David Smith, and Jessie Munson. Writing for Fader Magazine, Alex Robert Ross commented on Die Midwestern being, "... a raw but perfectly balanced album laced with existential crises, addictions, and world-weary resilience."

2022 brought the release of McKinley's third album, This Mess We're In, produced by Matt Ross-Spang and the same all-star band on his previous record. McKinley drew writing inspiration according to NPR Music, from "...the loss of several loved ones, including his mother and multiple friends." In 2025 McKinley released his fourth album, Live at the Burl, on the Oh Boy label.
