= All a Man Should Do =

Studio album by Lucero
- Released: September 18, 2015
- Genre: Punk rock, Alt-Country
- Label: ATO Records
- Producer: Ted Hutt

Lucero chronology
Texas & Tennessee (2013)	All a Man Should Do (2015)	Among the Ghosts (2018)

Professional ratings
Aggregate scores
Source	Rating
Metacritic	80/100
Review scores
Source	Rating
Slant	4/5 stars
AllMusic	4/5 stars

All a Man Should Do is the 9th studio album by the alt.country/rock group Lucero. It was recorded at Ardent Studios in Memphis, Tennessee, United States. It was released 18 September 2015 on ATO Records.

== Track listing ==
No.	Title	Length
1.	"Baby Don't You Want Me"	5:02
2.	"Went Looking For Warren Zevon's Los Angeles"	4:29
3.	"The Man I Was"	4:28
4.	"Can't You Hear Them Howl"	3:54
5.	"I Woke Up In New Orleans"	5:10
6.	"Throwback No. 2"	4:14
7.	"They Called Her Killer"	3:31
8.	"Young Outlaws"	4:04
9.	"I'm In Love With a Girl (Big Star cover)"	2:25
10.	"My Girl & Me In '93"	5:18

== Reviews and reception ==
The release has received positive reviews from publications such as American Songwriter.

== Charts ==
Chart (2015)	Peak position
US Billboard 200	63
US Top Alternative Albums (Billboard)	11
US Top Rock Albums (Billboard)	17
