= Woody at Home – Vol 1 & 2 =

Live album by Woody Guthrie
- Released: August 14, 2025
- Recorded: 1951 and 1952
- Genre: Folk
- Label: Shamus

Woody at Home – Vol 1 & 2 is a recording of a series of home recordings by Woody Guthrie recorded on a Revere T-100 Crescent home tape recorder consisting of 20 songs and two spoken word interludes. The album features a version of "This Land Is Your Land" with extra verses, an early talk-singing version of "Deportee (Plane Wreck at Los Gatos)", as well as thirteen songs that Guthrie never recorded elsewhere.

== Track listing ==
=== Vol 1, Side A ===
1. This Land Is Your Land (Woody’s Home Tape) (3:00)
2. Biggest Thing That Man Has Ever Done (2:53)
3. Howie, I’d Like To Talk To Yuh (spoken word) (2:25)
4. Deportee (Woody’s Home Tape) (3:47)
5. Great Ship (2:53)
6. Pastures of Plenty (3:11)

=== Vol 1, Side B ===
1. Jesus Christ (4:39)
2. I’m a Child Ta Fight (2:23)
3. Innocent Man (3:32)
4. I’ve Got To Know (4:17)
5. Backdoor Bum and the Big Landlord (3:18)

=== Vol 2, Side A ===
1. I Just Want To Tell You Fellers (spoken word) (0:55)
2. Peace Call (4:11)
3. Ain’t Afraid To Die (3:35)
4. Buoy Bells from Trenton (3:54)
5. Einstein Theme Song (with spoken word) (1:19)
6. One Little Thing An Atom Can’t Do (3:35)

=== Vol 2, Side B ===
1. Forsaken Lover (4:15)
2. My Id & My Ego (3:20)
3. Lifebelt Washed Up (5:17)
4. Funny Mountain (1:57)
5. You Better Git Ready (2:42)
