= Strays (Margo Price album) =

Studio album by Margo Price
- Released: January 13, 2023
- Studio: Fivestar Studio
- Length: 46:15
- Label: Loma Vista
- Producer: Jonathan Wilson

Margo Price chronology
That's How Rumors Get Started (2020)	Strays (2023)	Hard Headed Woman (2025)

Singles from Strays
- 1. "Been to the Mountain" Released: August 25, 2022; 2. "Change of Heart" Released: September 20, 2022; 3. "Lydia" Released: November 10, 2022

Professional ratings
Review scores
Source	Rating
The Guardian	4/5 stars
The Line of Best Fit	8/10
Mojo	4/5 stars
PopMatters	9/10
Rolling Stone	4/5 stars
Uncut	8/10

Strays is the fourth studio album by American country musician Margo Price, released on January 13, 2023, by Loma Vista Recordings. The album was produced by Price with musician Jonathan Wilson at his Fivestar Studio in Topanga Canyon, and features contributions from Mike Campbell (formerly of Tom Petty and the Heartbreakers, and whom Price recorded with for the second Dirty Knobs album, External Combustion), Sharon Van Etten, and Lucius.

The album was re-released as Strays II with nine additional songs on October 13, 2023. The nine songs were also released as "acts" in the weeks ahead of the re-released album.

== Promotion ==
Alongside recording the album, Price completed a memoir, Maybe We'll Make It, released in October 2022 by University of Texas Press. Price completed a book tour that ran through November 2022 and then opened the "'Til the Wheels Fall Off Tour" in December 2022, with plans to promote Strays through March 2023.

The first single released from Strays was "Been to the Mountain". on August 25, 2022. When Price announced the album in September 2022, she also released the second single, "Change of Heart". Further, in November 2022, a third single, "Lydia", was released in promotion of the album, a song Price described as "a moving collection of words about bodily autonomy and women's rights" and noted was inspired by her passing a women's health clinic years earlier on tour in Vancouver, and recorded prior to the United States Supreme Court overturned Roe v. Wade in June 2022.

== Track listing ==
All tracks are written by Margo Price and Jeremy Ivey, except where noted.

Strays track listing
No.	Title	Writer(s)	Length
1.	"Been to the Mountain"		5:28
2.	"Light Me Up" (featuring Mike Campbell)		5:05
3.	"Radio" (featuring Sharon Van Etten)	Price; Sharon Van Etten	2:49
4.	"Change of Heart"		4:04
5.	"County Road"		6:08
6.	"Time Machine"	Dillon Napier; Christopher Houston Denny	2:46
7.	"Hell in the Heartland"	Price; Lawrence Rothman	4:28
8.	"Anytime You Call" (featuring Lucius)	Ivey	3:48
9.	"Lydia"	Price	6:12
10.	"Landfill"		5:34
Total length:			46:15

=== Strays II ===
An expanded re-release of Strays was released on October 13, 2023, and promoted with three "acts" of songs. "Act I: Topanga Canyon" was released August 22, 2023. "Act II: Mind Travel" was released on September 14, 2023. The complete Strays II and "Act III: Burn Whatever's Left" were both released on October 13, 2023.

All tracks are written by Margo Price and Jeremy Ivey, except where noted.

Act I: Topanga Canyon
No.	Title	Writer(s)	Length
1.	"Strays"		3:09
2.	"Closer I Get" (featuring Ny Oh)		3:57
3.	"Malibu" (featuring Jonathan Wilson and Buck Meek)	Price; Ivey; Campbell	3:37
Total length:			10:42

Act II: Mind Travel
No.	Title	Writer(s)	Length
4.	"Black Wolf Blues"		3:59
5.	"Mind Travel"		3:54
6.	"Unoriginal Sin" (featuring Mike Campbell)	Price; Campbell	3:02
Total length:			10:53

Act III: Burn Whatever's Left
No.	Title	Writer(s)	Length
7.	"Homesick" (featuring Jonathan Wilson)	Price	4:28
8.	"Where Did We Go Wrong"		4:31
9.	"Burn Whatever's Left"		5:26
Total length:			14:25

== Personnel ==
Musicians

- Margo Price – vocals (all tracks); bells, maracas, tambourine (track 1); percussion (2, 4, 7, 8), acoustic guitar (3, 7, 9)
- Alex Muňoz – 12-string acoustic guitar, background vocals (all tracks); electric guitar (1–8, 10), baritone guitar (3, 10), acoustic guitar (4, 5), pedal steel guitar (5, 7, 10)
- Jamie Davis – acoustic guitar, background vocals (all tracks); electric guitar (1–6, 8, 10)
- Jeremy Ivey – acoustic guitar (all tracks), bass guitar (3, 8)
- Dillon Napier – drums (1–7, 10), drum machine (3), percussion (4, 5)
- Micah Hulscher – keyboards (all tracks), organ (1, 2, 4–7), piano (1–3, 5–8, 10), synthesizer (1–3, 5–7, 10), harpsichord (1, 2), celesta (6)
- Kevin Black – bass guitar (2, 4–7)
- Mike Campbell – electric guitar (2)
- Jonathan Wilson – Moog bass (3, 6, 8); guitar, timpani (3); bells, piano (6); acoustic guitar, castanets, tambourine (7); percussion (8, 10)
- Sharon Van Etten – vocals (3)
- Ny Oh – vocals (5, 10)
- Dexter Green – drums (8)
- Jess Wolfe – vocals (8)
- Holly Laessig – vocals (8)
- Jacob Braun – cello (9)
- Zach Dellinger – viola (9)
- Andrew Bullbrook – violin (9)
- Wynton Grant – violin (9)

Technical

- Jonathan Wilson – production, recording production, mixing (all tracks); engineering (3)
- Margo Price – co-production (all tracks); recording production, engineering (3); music production (6)
- Dexter Green – co-production (3, 8); music production, engineering (6)
- Lawrence Rothman – co-production, engineering (7)
- Adam Ayan – mastering
- Grant Milliken – engineering (1, 2, 5, 10)
- Parker Cason – engineering (4, 9)
- Joe Trentacosti – engineering (6), engineering assistance (3)
- Louis Rememapp – engineering (7)
- Anita Agoyan-Miu – engineering assistance (1, 2, 5, 10)
- Liv Painter – engineering assistance (7)
- Frankie Fingers – engineering assistance (9)
