= Deportee (Plane Wreck at Los Gatos) =

Song by Woody Guthrie
- Written: 1948
- Genre: Protest song
- Composer: Martin Hoffman
- Lyricist: Woody Guthrie

"Deportee (Plane Wreck at Los Gatos)" is a protest song with lyrics by Woody Guthrie and music by Martin Hoffman detailing the January 28, 1948 crash of a plane near Los Gatos Canyon, 20 miles (32 km) west of Coalinga in Fresno County, California, United States. The crash occurred in Los Gatos Canyon and not in the town of Los Gatos itself, which is in Santa Clara County, approximately 150 miles away.

Guthrie was inspired to write the song by what he considered the racist mistreatment of the passengers before and after the accident. The crash resulted in the deaths of 32 people, 4 Americans and 28 migrant farm workers who were being deported from California back to Mexico.

== History ==
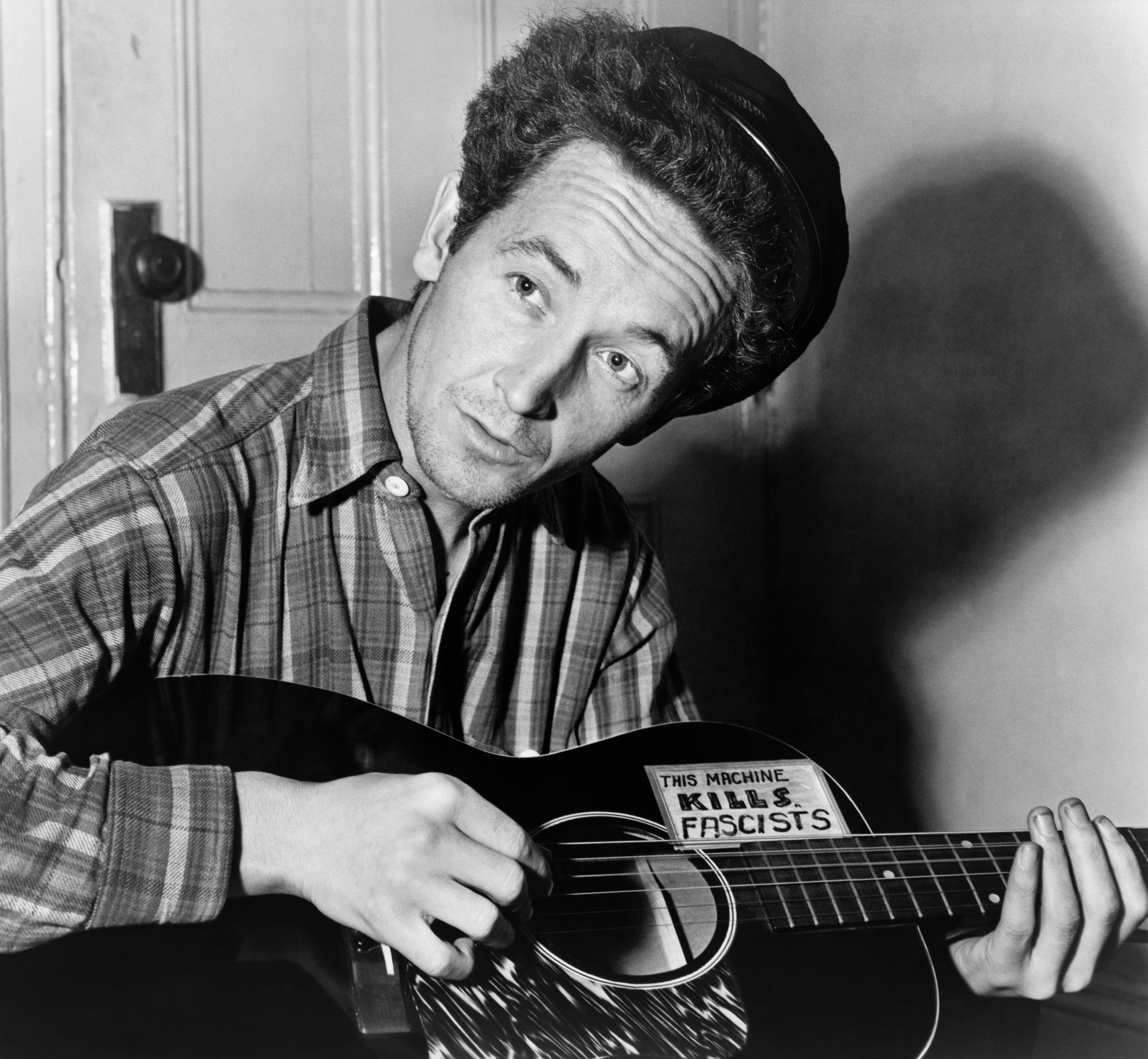
Woody Guthrie in 1943

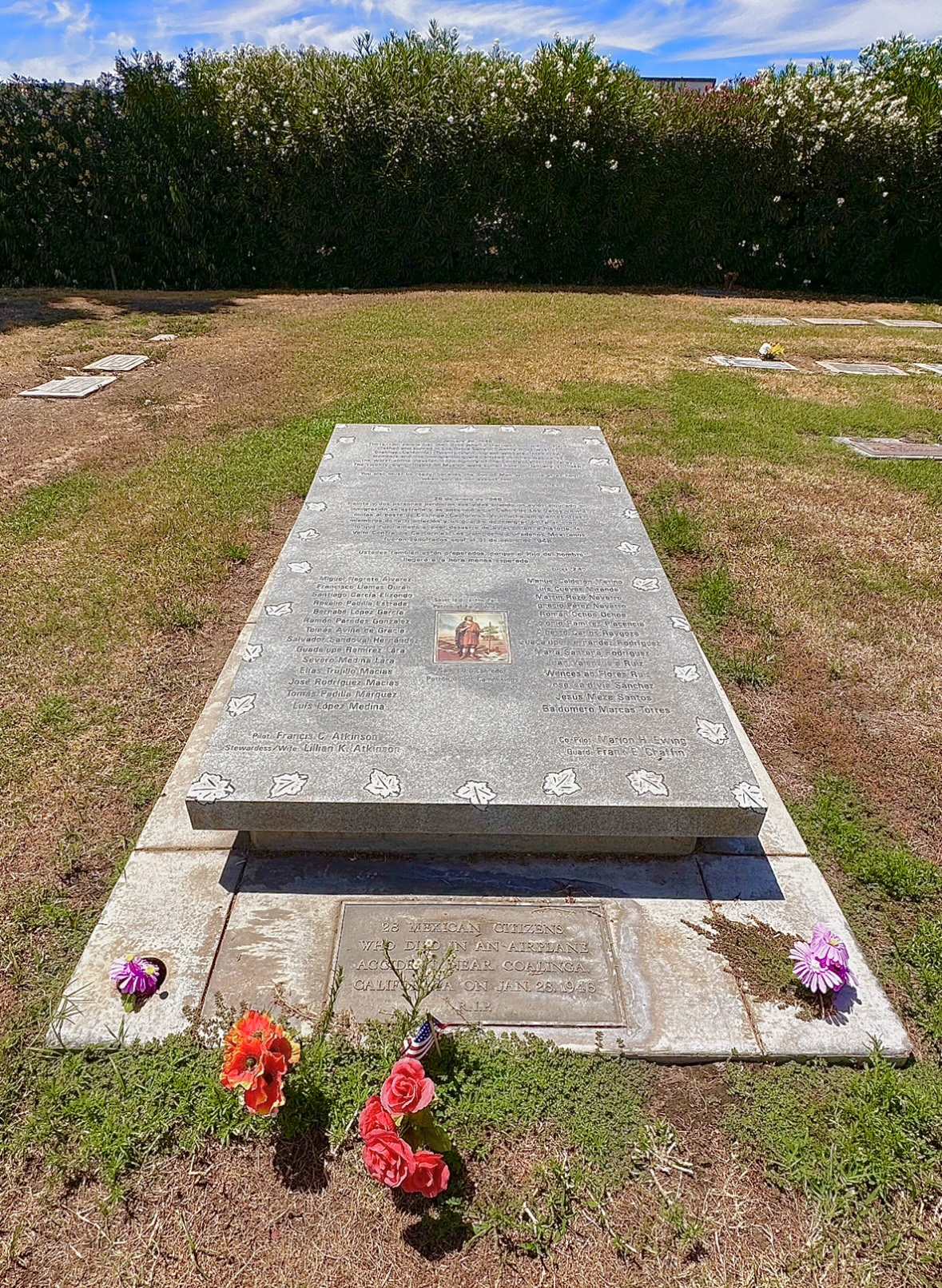
Memorial stone for the victims of the crash

The genesis of "Deportee (Plane Wreck at Los Gatos)" reportedly occurred when Woody Guthrie was struck by the fact that radio and newspaper coverage of the Los Gatos plane crash did not give the victims' names, but instead referred to them merely as "deportees". Guthrie lived in New York City at the time, and none of the deportees' names were printed in the January 29, 1948, New York Times report, only those of the flight crew and the security guard. However, the local newspaper, The Fresno Bee, covered the tragedy and listed just a few of the known names of the deportees, though they were erroneous.

Outraged by the lackluster coverage of the disaster and the omission of the Mexicans' names, Guthrie responded with a poem, which, when it was first written, featured only rudimentary musical accompaniment, with Guthrie chanting the song rather than singing it. In the poem, Guthrie assigned symbolic names to the dead: "Goodbye to my Juan, goodbye Rosalita; adiós, mis amigos, Jesús y María..." This early version can be heard on Woody at Home – Vol 1 & 2. A decade later, Guthrie's poem was set to music and given a haunting melody by a schoolteacher named Martin Hoffman. Shortly after, folk singer Pete Seeger, a friend of Woody Guthrie, began performing the song at concerts, and it was Seeger's rendition that popularized the song during this time.

In addition to being a lament for the braceros killed in the crash, the opening lines of "Deportee (Plane Wreck at Los Gatos)" are another protest by Guthrie:

The crops are all in and the peaches are rott'ning,
The oranges piled in their creosote dumps.

At the time, government policies paid farmers to destroy their crops in order to keep farm production low and prices high. Guthrie felt that it was wrong to render food inedible by poisoning it in a world where hungry people lived.

"Deportee (Plane Wreck at Los Gatos)" has been described by journalist Joe Klein as "the last great song he [Guthrie] would write, a memorial to the nameless migrants 'all scattered like dry leaves' in Los Gatos Canyon". The song has been recorded many times, often under a variety of other titles, including "Deportees", "Ballad of the Deportees", "Deportee Song", "Plane Crash at Los Gatos" and "Plane Wreck at Los Gatos (Deportee)". It inspired Tim Z. Hernandez, Jaime Ramirez and others to document the actual names, and a memorial stone to the deceased was dedicated in 2013 at Holy Cross Cemetery in Fresno.

== Recordings ==
The song has been recorded by many artists, including:

- Peter, Paul and Mary on LifeLines (1995) and LifeLines Live (1996).
- Dave Guard and the Whiskeyhill Singers (featuring Judy Henske) on Dave Guard and the Whiskeyhill Singers (1962).
- The Kingston Trio on Time To Think (1963).
- Cisco Houston on Cisco Sings the Songs of Woody Guthrie (1963).
- Judy Collins on Judy Collins #3 (1964), and the live album A Tribute to Woody Guthrie (1972).
- Odetta on album Odetta Sings of Many Things (1964).
- Julie Felix on her first album Julie Felix (1964).
- The Brothers Four on Sing of Our Times (1964).
- Joni Mitchell: a 1964 live recording on the Joni Mitchell Archives – Vol. 1: The Early Years (1963–1967) (2020)
- The Byrds on the Ballad of Easy Rider (1969).
- Alex Campbell on Alex Campbell Sampler (1969)
- Joan Baez on Blessed Are... (1971) and live on Bowery Songs (2004).
- Bob Dylan and Joan Baez on The Rolling Thunder Revue: The 1976 Live Recordings
- Paddy Reilly on The Life of Paddy Reilly (1971).
- Nana Mouskouri in a French translation with title "Adieu mes amis" on Le Tournesol (1970).
- The Bergerfolk on The Bergerfolk Sing For Joy, Smithsonian Folkways Recordings (1973).
- Barbara Dane on I Hate the Capitalist System (1973).
- Arlo Guthrie on Arlo Guthrie (1974) and with Pete Seeger on Arlo Guthrie and Pete Seeger: Together in Concert (1975).
- Christy Moore for BBC LiveSession from 'As I Roved Out' (1979) and The Spirit of Freedom (1986).
- Billy Bragg on Talking with the Taxman About Poetry (2006 reissue).
- Dolly Parton on 9 to 5 and Odd Jobs (1980).
- The Highwaymen and Johnny Rodriguez on The Highwaymen, Columbia Records (1985).
- Los Super Seven on Los Super Seven (1998).
- Bruce Springsteen has performed "Deportee" more than a few times live starting in 1981 and in a cover album of Woody Guthrie songs, "'til we outnumber them. . . ." (2000) He also performed "Deportee" when he received the Woody Guthrie Prize, 2021.
- Dan Bern on Live in New York (2011).
- Stan Ridgway on The Complete Epilogues (2016).
- The Last Internationale on TLI Unplugged (2017).
- Eilen Jewell as a single release (2026).
- Wolfe Tones on "20 golden Irish ballads, vol.1"
- The Klezmatics and Sofia Rei on We Were Made For These Times (2026).
- Margo Price on Days of Unrest (2026).
- Mason Via and Lucinda Williams as a single (2026).
- Ken Pomeroy on her EP Tonight's News (2026).
