= The Border Blasters =

American country music band

The Border Blasters are a Texas-based roots group composed of primary band members Todd Jagger and Jimmy Ray Harrell. The band calls their sound "Cowboy Swing & Hillbilly Blues" with Jagger on mandolin, guitar & vocals; and Harrell on guitar, piano, accordion & vocals. They are often joined by other musicians. The Border Blasters are noted for their easy-going on-stage camaraderie coupled with tight harmonies and raw, rootsy musicianship.

The band takes their name from the high-powered radio stations along the US/Mexico border that broadcast an eclectic mix of country, folk, blues, gospel and quirky advertisements around the world beginning in the early 1930s through the mid-1960s.

== History and discography ==
The group started in 1976 playing their first gig at Gruene Hall, and played consistently in and around Austin, Texas at popular venues such as the Armadillo World Headquarters, The Split Rail, The Broken Spoke, The Skyline Club, Saxon Pub, including a two-year standing show at Raven's Garage on Sixth Street (Austin, Texas). In 1988 The Border Blasters released a 16-song cassette tape titled "It's Too Much" produced by the legendary T.J. "Tiny" McFarland and engineered by the equally legendary Joe Gracey recorded at Lone Star Studios in Austin, Texas. In addition to the core band, now featuring Keith Carper on upright bass and drummer Phil Johnson, The Border Blasters were joined by special guests Kimmie Rhodes, Ponty Bone, Alvin Crow, Danny Levin, Freddie Krc, L.E. McCollough and Drew Castaneda. This tape was well received in Texas, getting airplay on most non-commercial stations in Texas including KUT and reached the Top-20 of KNON in that year.

In 1990 Jagger augmented his performances with The Border Blasters by joining the Austin Lounge Lizards to replace mandolinist Paul "Tex" Sweeney who had recently left the band. During this time Jagger received two Austin Music Awards as part of that band. In 1991 Jagger left Austin to move to Fort Davis, Texas. Shortly thereafter Harrell moved to Fort Davis, too, and they continued playing in the area, returning to Austin occasionally for shows.

In 2007 Jagger sent the 2" master tapes from the "It's Too Much" album to friend David Sinko in Nashville to have the aging tape digitized. Sinko, upon hearing the tracks, encouraged Jagger to let him remix and remaster the album. They released the album in 2008 under the title "Blast From The Past." The album spent 3 months in the Top 10 of the Freeform American Roots music chart, and was voted by reporting radio hosts the #2 Best Album in its category for 2008. The album also reached #24 on the Euro-Americana Chart.

The Border Blasters appeared on the Main Stage at Kerrville Folk Festival in 2009 and were featured artists at the International Folk Alliance conferences in 2009 and 2010 in Memphis, Tennessee. During one of these trips to Memphis the band recorded 8 tracks at Sun Studios, with Mark Rubin on upright bass & tuba, releasing the album in 2011 as "The Sun Session", which also spent 2 months in the Top-20 of the Freeform American Roots Chart.

== Awards ==
Todd Jagger is a two-time Austin Music Awards winner with the Austin Lounge Lizards and was given Honorable Mention as the best mandolinist in Austin in the Music City Magazine Readers' Poll. Jimmy Ray Harrell is a Kerrville Folk Festival New Folk Award winner and was on the 1972 festival album LP as one-half of the acoustic duo "Lou-Ray".

== Reviews ==
- AmericanaUK reviews "Blast From The Past"
- Steve Ramm "Anything Phonographic" reviews "The Sun Session" on Amazon.com
