= Matt Ross-Spang =

American record producer (born 1987)

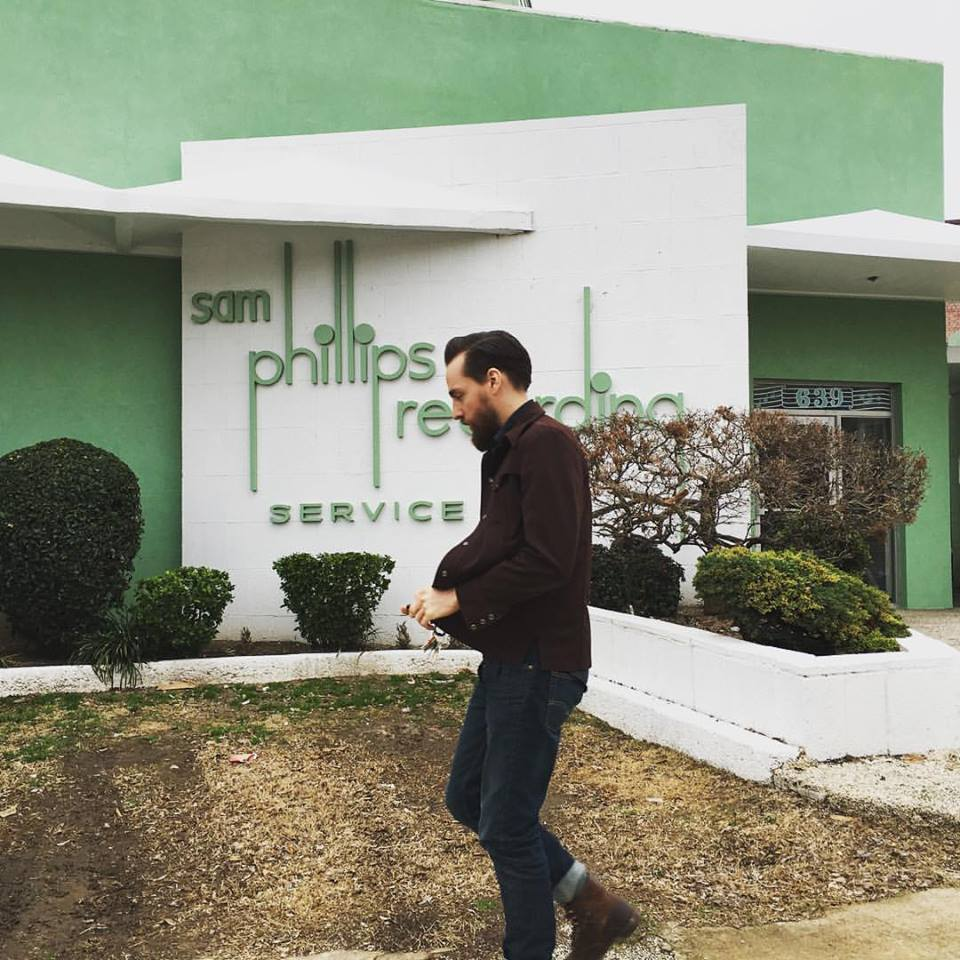

Background information
- Born: January 14, 1987 (age 39); Memphis, Tennessee, United States
- Occupations: Record Producer; Audio Engineer; Mixing Engineer
- Website: Official website

Matt Ross-Spang is an American multi-Grammy award winning record producer, engineer, and mixer. His credits include such artists as Jason Isbell, Margo Price, Al Green, John Prine and Elvis Presley.

== Life and career ==
Matt Ross-Spang, born in Memphis, Tennessee, began working at the Sun Studio when he was just 16, working his way from an intern to the Chief Engineer. Wanting to capture what made Sun Studio great, Ross-Spang championed hard to find, install, and use the same period equipment that Sam Phillips engineered with from the 1950s. His 11 years of dedication to Sun, and its signature sound, garnered national attention when it was featured by Lester Holt on NBC's Nightly News and The Today Show, as well as NPR's All Things Considered.

In 2015, Ross-Spang left Sun Studio to venture out on his own as an engineer and producer. His first project post-Sun was to engineer and mix Jason Isbell's Something More Than Free for record producer Dave Cobb. This record earned him his first Grammy Award. The record broke several records debuting at #1 on the Country, Rock, Folk, and Indie Charts. It also broke Americana Radio chart records, staying #1 for over 25 weeks. The record won Grammys for Best Americana Album and Best Americana Song ("24 Frames").

Ross-Spang continued engineering for Dave Cobb on records by Mary Chapin Carpenter, Chris Isaak, The Rival Sons, Corb Lund, Lori McKenna, Brett Dennen and the album Southern Family.

Other recent releases include the latest Sheepdogs record, Future Nostalgia, and the debut album by Margo Price. Price's album, entitled Midwest Farmer's Daughter, was recorded in 2014 at Sun Studio and released on Third Man Records. Engineered, mixed and co-produced by Ross-Spang, the record debuted this year in the top 10 Billboard country charts to critical acclaim.

In 2016, Ross-Spang was hired by Sony Records to mix 18 previously unreleased songs by Elvis Presley from his historic 1976 sessions from the Jungle Room at Graceland.

Later that year, Ross-Spang mixed and engineered the Lori McKenna album, The Bird and the Rifle, which later went on to be nominated for a Grammy Award for Best American Roots Album and Best American Roots Song by the Recording Academy.

2017 has seen the release of Sean Rowe's new album, Lore, which Ross-Spang produced and engineered. American Songwriter magazine gave the record 4 out of 5 stars.

In September 2018, Ross-Spang participated in Amazon Music's first 'Produced By' series, which asks producers to develop music exclusively for Amazon customers. His contributions include tracks from Al Green, Margo Price, John Prine, Erin Rae, and William Bell.

Ross-Spang has been a regular collaborator with The Mountain Goats, engineering their album In League With Dragons (2019), and producing both Getting Into Knives (2019) and Dark in Here (2021).

In 2020, Ross-Spang's mid century modern home was featured in Memphis Magazine, "From the tile floors to the original light fixtures, the 1957 home is remarkably preserved."

In 2021, Ross-Spang opened Southern Grooves, his 3,000-square-foot recording studio. The building process started in August 2020, with acousticians Steven Durr and Matt Schlachter. The studio occupies space, on the second floor of Crosstown Concourse. The studio consists of a live room, control room, a long hallway (for reverb) echo chamber, a lounge, office, tech shop and an EMT plate reverb room. "The undulating ceiling and lack of 90-degree angles or parallel surfaces in the live room reportedly give the impression that the space is a lot bigger than it is". Memphis Business Journal quoted, "One of the most distinctive features of Southern Grooves is the small, closet-sized echo chamber. The walls are designed at odd angles, and they're heavily plastered". “I knew I didn’t want acoustic tile,” Ross-Spang says, opting instead for the burlap-and-wood design favored by such iconic Memphis facilities as Stax Records and Ardent Studios. “I also knew I wanted an angled ceiling, because Sam Phillips did that at Sun and Phillips Recording. I’ve always loved that look and sound.”

== Awards and recognition ==
Matt Ross-Spang worked as the engineer on The Fluffy Jackets' debut album Fighting Demons featuring producer/ guitarist Manny Charlton (Nazareth) and bassist Neil Murray (Whitesnake). The album won the Best Studio Album of the Year Award for 2014, voted by listeners of The Blues Hour show in UK and France.

One year later, Ross-Spang won a Grammy Award for Jason Isbell's "Something More Than Free in 2015.

The City of Memphis named him one of its "30 under 30" Memphians in 2015

In 2016, Ross-Spang was awarded the Key to the City of Memphis.

He was featured on the Working Class Audio podcast with Matt Boudreau.

For their January/February 2017 issue, Tape Op magazine interviewed Ross-Spang about his past and the future of music production.

At the 2017 Grammy Awards, Lori McKenna's The Bird & The Rifle (engineered and mixed by Ross-Spang) was nominated for Best American Roots Album, Best American Roots Performance, and Best American Roots Song.

At the 2018 Grammy Awards, Ross-Spang received a Grammy for his work on Jason Isbell and the 400 unit's album, The Nashville Sound. The album received a Grammy Awards for Best Americana Album. Additionally, "If We Were Vampires" won the Grammy for Best American Roots Song.

At the 2018 UK Americana Awards, Emily Barker's album, Sweet Kind of Blue, was nominated for Best Album of the Year.

At the 2019 Grammy Awards, John Prine's The Tree of Forgiveness (engineered by Ross-Spang) was nominated for Best Americana Album, Best American Roots Song,

At the 2020 Grammy Awards, Iron & Wine / Calexico received two nominations with their Ross-Spang produced album Years to Burn. That same year, Don Bryant received a nomination for Best Traditional Blues Album forYou Make Me Feel, mixed by Ross-Spang.

At the 2024 Grammy Awards, Ross-Spang had seven nominations, and earned two trophies during the ceremonies. He co-produced Blind Boys of Alabama's "Echoes of the South" which won in the Best Roots Gospel Album. Ross-Spang also co-engineered Jason Isbell’s “Weathervanes” LP, which won for Best Americana Album, while the track "Cast Iron Skillet" won for Best American Roots Song.

== Selected discography ==
Year	Album	Artist	Credits
2026	Measure of a Man - Single	Nicki Bluhm	Producer, Engineer, Mixing, Guitar
2026	Accolades - EP	Lydia Loveless	Producer, Engineer, Mixing
2026	Days of Unrest - EP	Margo Price	Producer, Engineer, Mixing, Guitar
2026	A Heavy Duty Heart	Drayton Farley	Mixing
2026	Dan and Peggy Reeder LIVE	Dan Reeder	Mixing
2026	Rainmaker	John Hollier	Producer, Engineer, Mixing
2025	St. Paul & The Broken Bones	St. Paul & The Broken Bones	Engineer, Mixing
2025	A Place That I Call Home	Kolton Moore	Producer, Engineer, Mixing
2025	Get With This!	Tony Thomas Three	Producer, Engineer, Mixing
2025	Hard Headed Woman	Margo Price	Producer, Engineer, Mixing
2025	In The Heart of the Mountain	Ben Lucero	Co-Producer, Engineer, Mixing
2025	NEW PURPLE DRESS	Scott McMicken and THE EVER-EXPANDING	Mixing
2025	If You Never Go Away	BettySoo	Engineer, Mixing
2025	Lucero Unplugged	Ben Nichols, Rick Steff & Lucero	Producer, Engineer, Mixing
2024	Blue Christmas	Cyrena Wages, Butch Walker	Producer, Engineer, Mixing
2024	Paradise Alone - EP	The Sheepdogs	Engineer, Mixing
2024	Resurrection Fern	Bailey Bigger	Mixing
2024	Dr. Dog	Dr. Dog	Mixing
2024	Soul Provider	Elizabeth King	Co-Write, Mixing, Guitar
2024	Peacemaker	Vera Sola	Mixing, Engineer
2024	The Hypos	The Hypos	Mixing
2024	Vanity Project	Cyrena Wages	Producer, Engineer, Mixing
2023	Raised on Losing Ground	Last Wolf in the Woods	Engineer, Mixing
2023	Echoes of the South	Blind Boys of Alabama	Co-Producer, Engineer, Mixing
2023	Jubilee	Old Crow Medicine Show	Co-Producer, Engineer, Mixing
2023	Who Can See Forever	Iron & Wine	Mixing
2023	Weathervanes	Jason Isbell & the 400 Unit	Co-Engineer
2023	Come Back to Me	Peter One	Co-Producer, Engineer, Mixing
2023	Angels in Science Fiction	St. Paul and The Broken Bones	Producer, Engineer, Mixing
2023	Lori	Iron & Wine	Engineer, Mixing
2023	Psychopath	Morgan Wade	Mixing
2023	Aloha from Hawaii via Satellite	Elvis Presley	Co-Remixed
2023	Elvis on Tour	Elvis Presley	Mixing
2023	Twenty on High	Drayton Farley	Engineer, Mixing
2023	Should've Learned by Now	Lucero	Co-Producer, Engineer, Mixing
2022	Whatever You Need	Johnny Ray Daniels	Guitar
2022	Wellswood	Thomas Dollbaum	Mixing
2022	Welcome to Club XIII	Drive-By Truckers	Mixing
2022	The Devil Don't Like It	Dedicated Men of Zion	Guitar
2022	The Alien Coast	St. Paul and The Broken Bones	Producer, Mixing, Additional Engineering
2022	Made in Muscle Shoals, Vol. 2	The Revivalists	Recording
2022	I Got a Love	Elizabeth King	Guitar
2022	Paint This Town	Old Crow Medicine Show	Producer, Engineer, Mixing, Recording
2022	Avondale Drive	Nicki Bluhm	Composer
2022	This Mess We're In	Arlo McKinley	Producer, Mixing, Engineer
2021	Never Too Late to Call	Paul Thorn	Producer, Engineer, Mixing
2021	When You Found Me	Lucero	Producer, Engineer, Mixing
2021	Living in the Last Days	Elizabeth King	Guitar, Mixing
2021	Headwaters	Alexa Rose	Mixing
2021	Dark in Here	The Mountain Goats	Producer, Engineer
2020	From Elvis in Nashville	Elvis Presley	Mixing
2020	You Make Me Feel	Don Bryant	Mixing
2020	Waiting Out the Storm	Jeremy Ivey	Mixing
2020	Tiny Little Movies	Will Hoge	Mixing
2020	Live at Alice Tully Hall (January 27, 1973 - 2nd Show)	Lou Reed	Mixing
2020	Die Midwestern	Arlo McKinley	Producer, Engineer, Guitar, Mixing
2020	The Unraveling	Drive-By Truckers	Engineer, Mixing
2020	The New Ok	Drive-By Truckers	Engineer, Mixing
2020	Nobody Lives Here Anymore	Cut Worms	Producer, Engineer, Mixing
2020	Made in Muscle Shoals	The Revivalists	Engineer
2020	Getting into Knives	The Mountain Goats	Producer, Engineer, Mixing
2020	The Unraveling	Drive-By Truckers	Mixing, Recording
2020	Bone Structure	Ron Pope	Mixing
2020	Josh Ritter & The Milk Carton Kids	Josh Ritter, The Milk Carton Kids	Mixing
2019	Down To The River	The Allman Betts Band	Producer, Engineer, Mixing
2019	99 Cent Dreams	Eli "Paperboy" Reed	Producer, Engineer, Mixing
2019	The International Hotel, Las Vegas, Nevada, August 23, 1969	Elvis Presley	Mixing
2019	Call Me Lucky	Dale Watson	Mixing
2019	Front Porch	Joy Williams	Engineer
2019	The Flood In Color	Joe Pug	Engineer
2019	The Dream And The Dreamer	Jeremy Ivey	Mixing
2019	The Congress of Teddy and The Rough Riders	Teddy and The Rough Riders	Mixing
2019	Years To Burn	Calexico, Iron & Wine	Producer, Engineer, Mixing
2019	In League with Dragons	The Mountain Goats	Engineer
2018	The Tree of Forgiveness	John Prine	Engineer
2018	Lonesome as a Shadow	Charley Crockett	Producer, Engineer, Mixing
2018	Don't Let The Devil Ride	Paul Thorn	Engineer, Mixing
2018	Ancient Noise	Patrick Sweany	Producer, Engineer, Mixing
2018	To Rise You Gotta Fall	Nicki Bluhm	Producer, Engineer, Mixing
2018	Elvis Presley: The Searcher (Original Soundtrack)	Elvis Presley	Mastering, Mixing
2018	Encore	Anderson East	Engineer
2018	Among The Ghosts	Lucero	Engineer, Co-Producer, Mixing
2018	To The Sunset	Amanda Shires	Engineer
2018	Once In A Blue Moon	McKenna Bray	Engineer, Mixing
2018	Elvis Was A Love Affair	Dale Watson	Mixing, Recording
2018	Produced By: Matt Ross-Spang	Erin Rae, Margo Price, John Prine, Al Green, William Bell	Producer
2017	The Nashville Sound	Jason Isbell	Engineer
2017	All American Made	Margo Price	Producer, Engineer, Mixing
2017	New Lore	Sean Rowe	Producer, Engineer
2017	Walk into a Storm	The Lone Bellow	Engineer
2017	Sweet Kind of Blue	Emily Barker	Producer, Mixing
2017	Love Light Orchestra	Love Light Orchestra	Producer
2017	639 Madison	Susan Marshall	Producer
2017	Weakness	Margo Price	Producer
2017	This Son Is A Stranger To You	Rich Minus	Producer, Tracking
2017	Paper Cowboy	Margo Price	Producer, Engineer, Mixing
2017	West Coast Town	Chris Shiflett	Mixing, Recording
2017	Eli Paper Boy Reed Meets High & Mighty Brass Band	Eli Paper Boy Reed	Producer, Engineer, Mixing
2016	The Bird and the Rifle	Lori McKenna	Engineer, Mixing
2016	American Band	Drive By Truckers	Engineer
2016	Hollow Bones	Rival Sons	Engineer
2016	Midwest Farmer's Daughter	Margo Price	Producer, Engineer, Mixing, Wah Wah Guitar
2016	Por Favor	Brett Dennen	Engineer, Mixing, Recording
2016	Southern Family	Various Artists	Engineer, Mixing, Recording, Stomping
2016	Way Down in the Jungle Room	Elvis Presley	Mixing
2016	Memphis Ukulele Band	Memphis Ukulele Band	Producer, Mixing, Ukulele [Baritone], Mellotron, Percussion
2016	My Piece Of Land	Amanda Shires	Engineer
2016	Ain't Who I Was	Bonnie Bishop	Engineer, Mixing
2016	Shine On Rainy Day	Brent Cobb	Mixing, Recording
2016	The Things That We Are Made Of	Mary Chapin Carpenter	Mixing, Recording
2015	Future Nostalgia	The Sheepdogs	Engineer
2015	Things That Can't Be Undone	Corb Lund	Engineer
2015	Something More Than Free	Jason Isbell	Engineer
2015	Decorations Of Red	Susan Marshall	Producer, Engineer
2015	Trinity My Dear	Mark Edgar Stuart	Engineer
2015	First Comes The Night	Chris Isaak	Engineer
2014	Fighting Demons (Sun Studio Session)	The Fluffy Jackets	Engineer
2014	Hillbillies and Holy Rollers	Jason D. Williams	Engineer, Mixing
2014	Scaredy Cat	Grace Askew	Engineer
2014	If You....	Dale Watson & Hillbilly Casino	Engineer
2013	The Sun Studio Session	The Howlin' Brothers	Engineer
2013	Grey Goose: A Tribute To Leadbelly	Daniel Eriksen, Sting Sjøstrøm	Engineer
2013	Let It Rock: The Chuck Berry Tribute	The Refreshments	Engineer
2012	Live From The Legendary Sun Studio	Grace Potter & The Nocturnals	Engineer, Mixing
2012	Monsters	Onward, Soldiers	Mixing
2012	The Sun Session	Grand Marquis	Engineer
2012	Neptune City	Nicole Atkins	Engineer
2011	The Sun Sessions	The Texas Two/Dale Watson	Engineer
2011	Shiloh	Sean Martin	Engineer, mixing
2011	Beyond The Sun	Chris Isaak	Assistant Engineer
2011	The Sun Session	The Border Blasters	Recording, Engineer
2009	Glass Half Full	David Brookings	Producer
2007	Obsessed	David Brookings	Assistant Engineer
2007	EP	The Splints	Engineer
2005	Chorus Verses The Bridge	David Brookings	Engineer
