= That's How Rumors Get Started =

Studio album by Margo Price
- Released: July 10, 2020
- Recorded: 2018–2019
- Venues: EastWest (Hollywood, California)
- Studio: Los Angeles
- Genres: Americana, country rock
- Length: 35:38
- Label: Loma Vista Recordings
- Producer: Sturgill Simpson

Margo Price chronology
| Perfectly Imperfect at the Ryman (2020) | That's How Rumors Get Started (2020) | Strays (2023) |

Singles from That's How Rumors Get Started
- 1. "Stone Me" Released: January 16, 2020; 2. "Twinkle Twinkle" Released: March 11, 2020; 3. "Letting Me Down" Released: June 10, 2020

That's How Rumors Get Started is the third studio album by American country musician Margo Price. The album was planned for release on May 8, 2020, by Loma Vista Recordings, but was postponed due to the COVID-19 pandemic. The album was produced by Sturgill Simpson, with David R. Ferguson and Price serving as co-producers on the album with Simpson. The album was released on July 10, 2020. On April 22, 2022, a deluxe version of the album was released with 8 bonus tracks.

Price was also scheduled to tour in promotion of the album, with some dates in support of Chris Stapleton's 2020 "All-American Road Show Tour," but those were also postponed.

== Track listing ==
All tracks are written by Margo Price and Jeremy Ivey, except where noted.

| No. | Title | Writer(s) | Length |
|---|---|---|---|
| 1. | "That's How Rumors Get Started" | Price | 4:10 |
| 2. | "Letting Me Down" | | 3:14 |
| 3. | "Twinkle Twinkle" | | 3:31 |
| 4. | "Stone Me" | | 3:09 |
| 5. | "Hey Child" | | 3:49 |
| 6. | "Heartless Mind" | | 2:50 |
| 7. | "What Happened to Our Love?" | Price | 3:35 |
| 8. | "Gone to Stay" | | 3:01 |
| 9. | "Prisoner of the Highway" | Price | 3:44 |
| 10. | "I'd Die for You" | | 4:35 |
| Total length: | | | 35:38 |

Deluxe Version
| No. | Title | Writer(s) | Length |
|---|---|---|---|
| 11. | "Goin' To the Country" | | 3:11 |
| 12. | "Long Live the King" | | 4:49 |
| 13. | "You Don't Own Me" (Lesley Gore cover) | David White, John Madara | 3:16 |
| 14. | "Hitman" | | 3:50 |
| 15. | "He Made a Woman Out of Me" (Bobbie Gentry cover) | Donald Hill, Fred Burch | 2:40 |
| 16. | "Later On" | | 4:50 |
| 17. | "You're No Good" (Linda Rondstadt and Dee Dee Warwick cover) | Clint Ballard Jr. | 4:57 |
| 18. | "Better Than Nothin'" | | 3:08 |
| Total length: | | | 1:06:26 |

== Critical reception ==
Professional ratings
Aggregate scores
| Source | Rating |
|---|---|
| AnyDecentMusic? | 7.5/10 |
| Metacritic | 81/100 |
Review scores
| Source | Rating |
| CLASH | 8/10 |
| Consequence of Sound | B |
| Exclaim! | 8/10 |
| Flood Magazine | 8/10 |
| Paste | 7/10 |
| The Guardian | 4/5 stars |
| The Irish Times | 3/5 stars |
| The Line of Best Fit | 8/10 |
| Tom Hull | B+ |

That's How Rumors Get Started was met with positive reviews. At Metacritic, which assigns a normalized rating out of 100 to reviews from professional critics, the album received an average score of 81, based on 16 reviews. The aggregator AnyDecentMusic? has the critical consensus of the album at a 7.5 out of 10.

Alexis Petridis of The Guardian says “Margo Price has got the talent to take on whatever the future holds."

=== Accolades ===
Accolades for That's How Rumors Get Started
| Publication | Accolade | Rank |
|---|---|---|
| Consequence of Sound | Top 50 Albums of 2020 | 35 |

== Charts ==
Chart performance for That's How Rumors Get Started
| Chart (2020) | Peak position |
|---|---|
| Scottish Albums (Official Charts) | 14 |
| UK Albums (Official Charts) | 95 |
| UK Country Albums (Official Charts) | 2 |
| US Billboard 200 | 151 |
| US Americana/Folk Albums (Billboard) | 2 |
| US Independent Albums (Billboard) | 26 |
| US Top Album Sales (Billboard) | 7 |
| US Top Country Albums (Billboard) | 17 |
| US Vinyl Albums (Billboard) | 3 |
