= Midwest Farmer's Daughter =

2016 studio album by Margo Price

Studio album by Margo Price
- Released: March 25, 2016
- Genre: Country
- Length: 43:30
- Label: Third Man
- Producers: Alex Muñoz & Matt Ross-Spang

Margo Price chronology
Midwest Farmer's Daughter (2016)	All American Made (2017)

Singles from Midwest Farmer's Daughter
- 1. "Hurtin' (On the Bottle)" Released: December 4, 2015; 2. "Hands of Time" Released: March 11, 2016

Midwest Farmer's Daughter is the debut studio album by American country singer Margo Price. Released on March 25, 2016, it was the first country album to be released on Third Man Records. Despite the album's limited commercial success, peaking at No. 189 on the Billboard 200, it is considered by many publications and music critics to be one of 2016's best albums.

== Production ==
Midwest Farmer's Daughter was recorded live to analog tape at the famed Sun Studio in Memphis, Tennessee and mixed at the nearby Ardent Studios.

== Critical reception ==
Professional ratings
Aggregate scores
Source	Rating
Metacritic	86/100
Review scores
Source	Rating
AllMusic	5/5 stars
Exclaim!	8/10
The Guardian	4/5 stars
The Observer	4/5 stars
Pitchfork	7.0/10
Rolling Stone	4/5 stars
Spin	8/10
The Times	5/5 stars
Uncut	8/10
Vice	A−

Midwest Farmer's Daughter received highly positive reviews from music critics. At Metacritic, which assigns a normalized rating out of 100 to reviews from mainstream critics, the album has an average score of 86 out of 100, which indicates "universal acclaim" based on 13 reviews.

Will Hermes of Rolling Stone gave the album a favorable review, describing the vocal style of Price as "restrained yet mighty, her songcraft amazingly vivid, and the arranging instinct spot on". Hermes noted that Price had a "taste for retro styling", and that starting from the opening song, "Hands of Time", "you're reminded of the incredible power that lies in tradition well-used. It's a power the rest of this record makes plain." Stephen Thomas Erlewine of AllMusic saw Loretta Lynn as the primary inspirations of Price, but thought that even though the album may drift toward the traditional in some songs, "Price's sensibility is modern, turning these old-fashioned tales of heartbreak, love, loss, and perseverance into something fresh and affecting." Paul Grein of Hits Daily Double predicted the album would be in contention for the Album of the Year award at the 59th Annual Grammy Awards.

=== Accolades ===
Publication	Rank	List
AllMusic	N/A	Best Albums of 2016
American Songwriter	3	Top 50 Albums of 2016
BrooklynVegan	23	Top Albums of 2016
Cosmopolitan	11	The 15 Best Albums of 2016
Entertainment Weekly	15	The 50 Best Albums of 2016
Entertainment Weekly	2	The Best Country Albums of 2016
Exclaim!	3	Top 10 Folk & Country Albums of 2016
Flood Magazine	25	Best Records of 2016
The Guardian	32	The Best Albums of 2016
NME	33	50 best albums of 2016
NPR	20	50 Best Albums of 2016
Paste	12	The 50 Best Albums of 2016
PopMatters	30	The 70 Best Albums of 2016
Rolling Stone	3	40 Best Country Albums of 2016
Rolling Stone	21	50 Best Albums of 2016
Rough Trade	3	Albums of the Year
Slant Magazine	17	The 25 Best Albums of 2016
Stereogum	7	The 20 Best Country Albums of 2016
Uncut	23	Albums of the Year

== Commercial performance ==
Midwest Farmer's Daughter debuted at No. 189 on the Billboard 200. It also debuted at No. 10 on the Billboard Top Country Albums chart, the first time in the history of the chart (which started in 1964) a solo female has debuted in the top 10 with her first release without also having any history on the Hot Country Songs chart. As of June 2017 the album has sold 52,600 copies in the United States.

== Track listing ==
No.	Title	Writer(s)	Length
1.	"Hands of Time"	Margo Price	6:10
2.	"About to Find Out"	Price, Jeremy Ivey	3:12
3.	"Tennessee Song"	Price, Ivey	4:40
4.	"Since You Put Me Down"	Price, Ivey	4:52
5.	"Four Years of Chances"	Price	4:33
6.	"This Town Gets Around"	Price	2:55
7.	"How the Mighty Have Fallen"	Mark Fredson	3:10
8.	"Weekender"	Price	4:40
9.	"Hurtin' (On the Bottle)"	Price, Fredson, Ivey, Caitlin Rose	4:12
10.	"World's Greatest Loser"	Price, Ivey	1:34
11.	"Desperate and Depressed"		3:30
Total length:			43:30

== Personnel ==
Adapted from AllMusic.

Musicians

- Jeremy Ivey – bass guitar, acoustic guitar, harmonica
- Kevin Black – background vocals
- Jamie Davis – electric guitar
- Eleonore Denig – violin
- Josh Hedley – harmony
- Micah Hulscher – Fender Rhodes, organ, piano
- Larissa Maestro – cello
- Alex Munoz – Dobro, acoustic guitar, mandolin, background vocals
- Dillon Napier – drums, percussion
- Margo Price – acoustic guitar, harmony, vocals
- Matt Ross-Spang – wah-wah guitar
- Luke Schneider – pedal steel guitar
- Kristin Weber – fiddle, violin, harmony, background vocals
- Eric Whitman – background vocals

Technical personnel

- John Baldwin – mastering
- Danielle Holbert – photography
- Alex Munoz – engineer, producer
- Matt Ross-Spang – engineer, mixing, producer
- Nathanio Strimpopulos – artwork

== Chart positions ==
=== Weekly charts ===
Chart (2016)	Peak position
UK Country Albums (Official Charts)	1
US Billboard 200	189
US Top Country Albums (Billboard)	10
US Americana/Folk Albums (Billboard)	5
US Independent Albums (Billboard)	11

=== Year-end charts ===
Chart (2016)	Position
US Top Country Albums (Billboard)	62
