= All American Made =

Studio album by Margo Price
- Released: October 20, 2017
- Recorded: 2016–2017
- Studio: Phillips Recording
- Genre: Country
- Length: 45:50
- Label: Third Man Records
- Producer: Margo Price, Jeremy Ivey, Matt Ross-Spang & Alex Munoz

Margo Price chronology
Midwest Farmer's Daughter (2016)	All American Made (2017)	Perfectly Imperfect at the Ryman (2020)

Singles from All American Made
- 1. "Weakness" Released: July 27, 2017; 2. "A Little Pain" Released: September 6, 2017

All American Made is the second studio album by American country musician Margo Price. The album was released on October 20, 2017, by Third Man Records. In November 2017, the album debuted at number 89 on the Billboard 200. The album reached #1 in the Official Country Artists Chart in its third week of release in the UK.

In interviews for the album's release, Price noted the influence of Tom Petty on her songwriting. She dedicated the album to him following his death in early October 2017.

Price promoted the album with the Nowhere Fast tour that started in September 2017 and concluded in March 2018.

== Critical reception ==
Professional ratings
Aggregate scores
Source	Rating
AnyDecentMusic?	7.9/10
Metacritic	82/100
Review scores
Source	Rating
AllMusic	4/5 stars
The A.V. Club	B+
The Guardian	4/5 stars
Mojo	4/5 stars
NME	4/5 stars
The Observer	4/5 stars
Pitchfork	7.6/10
Q	4/5 stars
Rolling Stone	3.5/5 stars
Vice (Expert Witness)	B+

All American Made received positive reviews from professional music critics, and it has been given a rating of 82 on Metacritic based on 14 reviews, indicating "universal acclaim".

Stephen Thomas Erlewine of AllMusic wrote that in a shift from the personal vignettes of her debut album, Price does not disguise her liberal politics in this album, and she also broadens her musical range "drawing an expansive portrait of American roots music, one that touches on R&B, Tex-Mex, girl group pop, spacy indie rock, and even Glen Campbell's trippiest moments", which are "unified by a musical and lyrical aesthetic that views American life not only as a continuum, but a place where the past and present, rural and urban are in constant dialogue." Leonie Cooper of NME noted that it is an album that harks back to the country genre's more authentic beginnings, and that by "adding a decent dose of 2017 into her classic sound, Price creates something truly great." Jonathan Bernstein of Rolling Stone compares Price's album to the best work of the seventies of Willie Nelson, who dueted with Price in "Learning to Lose", in that it is "both reverent and revolutionary, a traditional-minded statement that nevertheless blazes an urgent path forward."

=== Accolades ===
Publication	Accolade	Rank	Ref.
ABC News	Top 50 Albums of 2017	36	
American Songwriter	Top 25 Albums of 2017	1	
The Atlantic	Top 10 Albums of 2017	5	
Cosmopolitan	Top 10 Albums of 2017	5	
Entertainment Weekly	Top 25 Albums of 2017	5	
Exclaim!	Top 10 Folk and Country Albums of 2017	9	
Noisey	Top 100 Albums of 2017	21	
The Philadelphia Inquirer	Top 10 Albums of 2017	6	
PopMatters	Top 60 Albums of 2017	23	
The Ringer	Top 10 Albums of 2017	8	
Rolling Stone	Top 50 Albums of 2017	16	
Rolling Stone	Top 40 Americana/Country Albums of 2017	1	
Stereogum	Top 10 Country Albums of 2017	2	
Uncut	Top 75 Albums of 2017	24	

== Commercial performance ==
The album debuted at No. 89 on Billboard 200, No. 12 on Top Country Albums and No. 4 on Americana/Folk Albums, with 7,000 copies sold. The album has sold 33,700 copies in the United States as of February 2019.

== Track listing ==
No.	Title	Writer(s)	Length
1.	"Don't Say It"	Price	2:44
2.	"Weakness"	Price, Jeremy Ivey	2:47
3.	"A Little Pain"	Price	2:56
4.	"Learning to Lose" (with Willie Nelson)	Price	6:20
5.	"Pay Gap"	Price	3:54
6.	"Nowhere Fast"	Price, Ivey	4:07
7.	"Cocaine Cowboys"	Price, Ivey	3:26
8.	"Wild Women"	Price	2:56
9.	"Heart of America"	Price, Ivey	3:16
10.	"Do Right by Me" (with The McCrary Sisters)	Price, Ivey	3:10
11.	"Loner"	Ivey	4:30
12.	"All American Made"	Price, Ivey	5:50
Total length:			45:50

== Personnel ==
Album Band

- Margo Price – vocals, percussion (1, 3, 5, 7, 11), acoustic guitar (4, 7, 9, 12), nylon string guitar (5), harmonies (5, 7, 8, 9)
- Jeremy Ivey – acoustic guitar, electric guitar, bass (5), harmonica (9, 10), harmonies (9)
- Dillon Napier – drums
- Kevin Black – bass
- Micah Hulscher – piano (1, 2, 4, 6, 8, 9), Mellotron (6, 9), synthesizer (6, 7), Wurlitzer (7, 10), organ (3), accordion (5)
- Luke Schneider – pedal steel, dobro (5)
- Jamie Davis – electric guitar, acoustic guitar (10)

Additional Musicians

- Alex Muñoz – baritone guitar (6), electric guitar (11, 12), percussion (10), e-bow (11)
- Josh Hedley – fiddle (2, 8, 11), harmonies (2, 11)
- Ashley Wilcoxson & Erin Rae – background vocals (7, 8)
- Lester Snell – string arrangement (3, 4)
- Willie Nelson – vocals and "Trigger" (4)
- Mickey Raphael – harmonica (4)
- Cory Younts – mandolin (5)
- The McCrary Sisters – background vocals (10)
- Matt Ross-Spang – Moog synthesizer (12)
- The East Nashville Orphan Choir – background vocals (12)

== Charts ==
Chart (2017)	Peak position
US Americana/Folk Albums (Billboard)	4
US Independent Albums (Billboard)	6
US Billboard 200	89
US Top Country Albums (Billboard)	12
US Vinyl Albums (Billboard)	3
UK Albums (OCC)	86
