= Margo Price =

American country music singer-songwriter (born 1983)

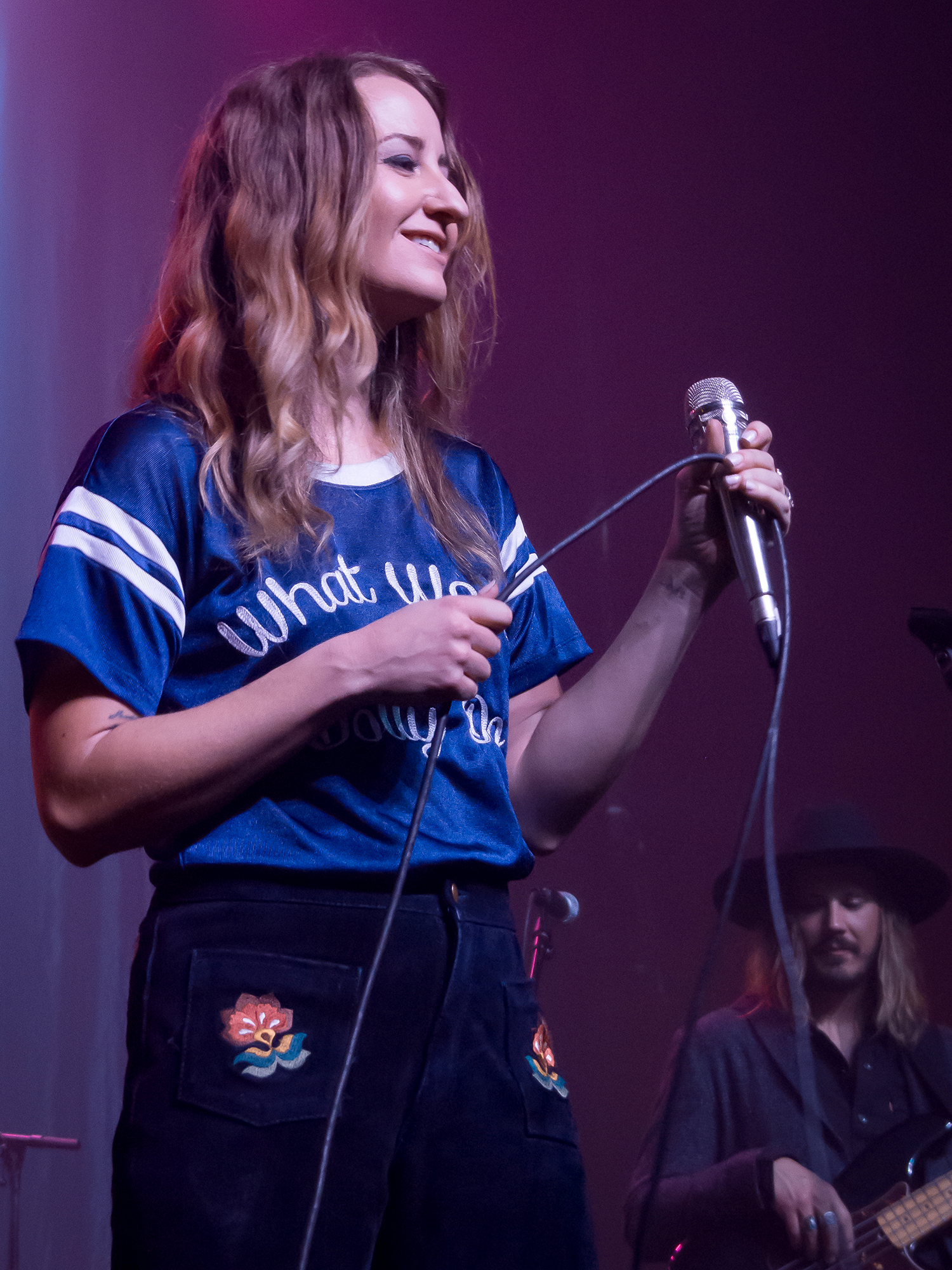
- Price performing in 2018

Background information
- Born: Margo Rae Price; April 15, 1983 (age 43); Aledo, Illinois, United States
- Origin: Nashville, Tennessee, U.S.
- Genres: Country; Americana; outlaw country; country-soul
- Occupations: Singer-songwriter; record producer; author
- Instruments: Vocals; acoustic guitar; piano; drums
- Years active: 2013–present
- Labels: Third Man; Loma Vista
- Website: margoprice.net

Margo Rae Price (born April 15, 1983) is an American country singer-songwriter, producer, and author based in Nashville. Born in Northern Illinois, after several years of living and performing in Nashville she released her debut album Midwest Farmer's Daughter in 2016.

Price has released six studio albums and multiple live albums and singles. Her music mixes country rock and honky tonk with slower ballads and psychedelia in a style she has described as "feral and free". Her songwriting covers topics including parenting, friendship, economic struggle, and hard living.

An advocate for anti-racism, women's rights, gun violence prevention, economic empowerment, and migrant workers, Price is a board member of Farm Aid, and has helped raise funds and awareness for several other organizations including Oxfam, ACLU, and Noise For Now.

== Career ==
Price grew up in the small town of Aledo, Illinois where she played piano and sang in a church choir before studying dance and theater at Northern Illinois University.

In Nashville, Price and her husband, guitarist Jeremy Ivey, were part of Secret Handshake before she and Ivey started Buffalo Clover and later formed Margo and the Pricetags, which she says was "supposed to be a supergroup." Recording artist Sturgill Simpson and Kenny Vaughan, longtime guitarist in Marty Stuart's band, have both been in the lineup at various times.

Rolling Stone Country described Price as "a fixture of the East Nashville music community," and she appeared on that publication's list of Country Artists You Need to Know in 2014.

In previewing Price's first album release, The Fader called her "country's next star." Her debut solo album Midwest Farmer's Daughter was released on Third Man Records on March 25, 2016. The album was recorded at Sun Studio in Memphis, Tennessee, and was engineered by Matt Ross-Spang. The album was recorded in three days.

On April 9, 2016, Price was the musical guest on Saturday Night Live. On May 17, 2016, she made her UK television debut on Later... with Jools Holland. In addition to her appearance on UK television, her tracks have appeared on shows on BBC Radio 6 Music, notably with Steve Lamacq. On October 6, 2016, she appeared on Anthony Bourdain: Parts Unknown. On November 16, 2016, she appeared on Charlie Rose, performing "All American Made" (a Buffalo Clover song) and "Hands of Time" from Midwest Farmer's Daughter.

Price was proven to be popular in the UK, with her album reaching number 1 on the UK Country Albums Chart, embarking on UK tours in 2016 and 2017, performing on Later... with Jools Holland and at the Glastonbury Festival as well as garnering three nominations from the UK Americana Awards.

In her concerts, Price plays acoustic guitar and electric guitar and sings. In addition there is a second drum kit on stage, and as part of a coda for one or another of her songs, she plays those drums for a several-minute jam with the rest of the band. On July 27, 2017, Price released a four-track EP titled Weakness, followed on October 20, 2017, by her second album, All American Made.

Price performed as part of the C2C: Country to Country festival in 2018. In December 2018, she received a nomination for Best New Artist at the 61st Annual Grammy Awards. On July 10, 2020, she released her third album, That's How Rumors Get Started.

On April 8, 2021, it was announced that Price had joined the board of directors for Farm Aid, along with Willie Nelson's wife Annie. On October 4, 2022, Margo released her first memoir, Maybe We’ll Make It: A Memoir, published by University of Texas Press. Her fourth album, Strays, was issued in January 2023. Later that year, Price performed on and produced Jessi Colter's album Edge of Forever.

In 2024, Price collaborated with Mike Campbell (formerly of Tom Petty and the Heartbreakers) to cover Petty's song "Ways to be Wicked" for the Petty Country Tribute Album. Campbell and Price have previously collaborated on the Dirty Knobs song, "State of Mind", and her own song "Light Me Up". She also worked with Orville Peck on the track "You're an Asshole, I Can't Stand You (And I Want a Divorce)" for his duets album Stampede, released in August 2024.

She released Days of Unrest, on July 3, 2026. The surprise release in support of illegal immigration was themed with mariachi instrumentals named for San Marcos cover songs, and vocal accompaniment by Billy Swan and Joan Baez.

== Influences ==
Price cites Tom Petty, Janis Joplin, Bobbie Gentry, Emmylou Harris, Bonnie Raitt, and Dolly Parton as significant influences. Her voice has also been compared to those of Loretta Lynn and Tammy Wynette. Price's great-uncle, Bobby Fischer, was a songwriter for George Jones, Conway Twitty, Charley Pride, and Reba McEntire.

== Personal life ==
Price is married to Jeremy Ivey, who plays guitar in her band. In 2010, Price gave birth to twin boys, one of whom died shortly after birth. On June 4, 2019, Price gave birth to their third child, a daughter.

== Discography ==
- Midwest Farmer's Daughter (2016)
- All American Made (2017)
- That's How Rumors Get Started (2020)
- Strays (2023)
- Strays II (2023)
- Hard Headed Woman (2025)
- Days of Unrest (2026)

== Awards and nominations ==
Accolades for Margo Price
Year	Association	Category	Nominated work	Result
2017	UK Americana Awards	International Album of the Year	Midwest Farmer's Daughter	Nominated
2017	UK Americana Awards	International Song of the Year	"Hands of Time"	Won
2017	UK Americana Awards	International Artist of the Year	Margo Price	Nominated
2017	American Music Prize	Best Debut Album	Midwest Farmer's Daughter	Won
2017	Americana Music Honors & Awards	Artist of the Year	Margo Price	Nominated
2018	Americana Music Honors & Awards	Album of the Year	All American Made	Nominated
2018	Americana Music Honors & Awards	Song of the Year	"A Little Pain"	Won

=== Grammy Awards ===
Year	Category	Nominated work	Result	Ref.
2019	Best New Artist	Herself	Nominated	
2026	Best Traditional Country Album	Hard Headed Woman	Nominated	
2026	Best Country Duo/Group Performance	"Love Me Like You Used To Do"	Nominated	
