= Sturgill Simpson discography =

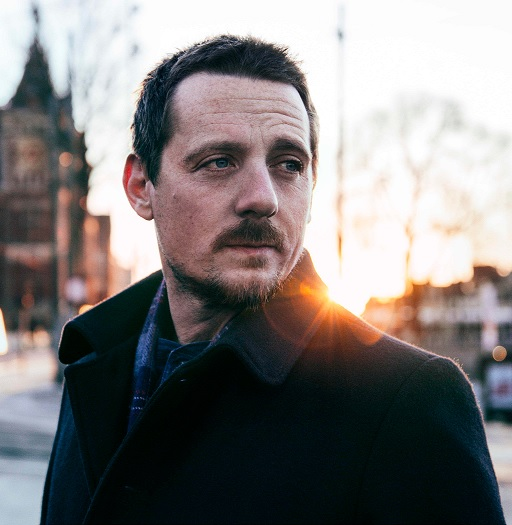
- Sturgill Simpson in 2016.
- Studio albums: 9
- Singles: 6
- Music videos: 10

American musician Sturgill Simpson has released nine studio albums (including two as Johnny Blue Skies), six singles, and ten music videos. Simpson debuted in 2013 with the album High Top Mountain on his own High Top Mountain label. This was followed in 2014 by Metamodern Sounds in Country Music, which featured the single "Turtles All the Way Down". Simpson signed to Atlantic Records for A Sailor's Guide to Earth in 2016, which included his first chart entries "Brace for Impact (Live a Little)" and a cover of Nirvana's "In Bloom" He moved to Elektra Records for Sound & Fury in 2019, which was accompanied by an anime film of the same name. He returned to High Top Mountain for a pair of albums, Cuttin' Grass, Vol. 1: The Butcher Shoppe Sessions and Cuttin' Grass, Vol. 2: The Cowboy Arms Sessions; both released in 2020, these consisted of acoustic re-recordings of previous songs. The Ballad of Dood & Juanita followed in 2021.

In June 2024, Simpson announced that he would release an eighth album, Passage du Desir, under the name Johnny Blue Skies.

== Albums ==
Title	Album details	Peak chart positions						Sales
Title	Album details	US	US Country	US Rock	CAN	NOR	UK	Sales
High Top Mountain	Release date: June 11, 2013; Label: High Top Mountain; Formats: CD, LP, download	—	31	—	—	—	—	US: 105,600
Metamodern Sounds in Country Music	Release date: May 13, 2014; Label: High Top Mountain; Formats: CD, LP, download	59	8	—	—	—	—	US: 228,600
A Sailor's Guide to Earth	Release date: April 15, 2016; Label: Atlantic; Formats: CD, LP, download	3	1	1	31	34	43	US: 217,900
Sound & Fury	Released: September 27, 2019; Label: Elektra; Formats: CD, LP, download	12	3	3	55	—	79	US: 72,900
Cuttin' Grass, Vol. 1: The Butcher Shoppe Sessions	Released: October 16, 2020; Label: High Top Mountain; Formats: CD, LP, download	24	2	—	—	—	—	
Cuttin' Grass, Vol. 2: The Cowboy Arms Sessions	Released: December 11, 2020; Label: High Top Mountain; Formats: CD, LP, download	30	5	—	—	—	—	
The Ballad of Dood and Juanita	Released: August 20, 2021; Label: High Top Mountain; Formats: CD, LP, download	23	3	—	—	—	—	
Passage du Desir (as Johnny Blue Skies)	Released: July 12, 2024; Label: High Top Mountain; Formats: CD, LP, download	29	9	7	—	—	—	
Mutiny After Midnight (as Johnny Blue Skies and the Dark Clouds)	Released: March 13, 2026; Label: Atlantic Outpost; Formats: CD, LP, cassette, download	3	—	1	—	—	—	US: 59,000
"—" denotes a recording that did not chart or was not released in that territory.

== Singles ==
=== As lead artist ===
Year	Song	Peak chart positions			Album
Year	Song	US AAA	US Country	US Rock	Album
2014	"Living the Dream"	—	—	—	Metamodern Sounds in Country Music
2014	"Turtles All the Way Down"	—	—	—	Metamodern Sounds in Country Music
2014	"The Promise"	—	—	—	Metamodern Sounds in Country Music
2016	"Brace for Impact (Live a Little)"	23	—	44	A Sailor's Guide to Earth
2016	"In Bloom"	—	48	37	A Sailor's Guide to Earth
2019	"Sing Along"	7	—	17	Sound & Fury
2026	"Situation"	4	—	—	Mutiny After Midnight
2026	"Don't Let Go"	32	—	—	Mutiny After Midnight
"—" denotes releases that did not chart

=== As featured artist ===
Title	Year	Album
"Resentment" (Kesha featuring Brian Wilson, Wrabel, and Sturgill Simpson)	2019	High Road
"Paradise"	2021	Broken Hearts & Dirty Windows: Songs of John Prine, Vol. 2
"Big Time" (with Angel Olsen)	2022	Single
"Use Me (Brutal Hearts)" (Diplo featuring Sturgill Simpson [as Johnny Blue Skies] and Dove Cameron)	2023	Diplo Presents Thomas Wesley, Chapter 2: Swamp Savant

=== Other charted songs ===
Year	Song	Peak chart positions		Album
Year	Song	US Rock	US AAA	Album
2019	"Remember to Breathe"	30	—	Sound & Fury
2019	"Ronin"	44	—	Sound & Fury
2019	"Mercury in Retrograde"	46	—	Sound & Fury
2020	"I Don't Mind (2020)"	—	29	Cuttin' Grass, Vol. 1: The Butcher Shoppe Sessions

== Music videos ==
Year	Video	Director(s)
2013	"Railroad of Sin"	Yosuke Torii and Shunsuke Ochiai
2014	"Turtles All the Way Down"	Graham Uhelski
2014	"The Promise"	Graham Uhelski
2016	"Brace for Impact (Live a Little)"	Matt Mahurin
2016	"In Bloom"	Matt Mahurin
2016	"Breakers Roar"	Matt Mahurin
2017	"All Around You"	Matt Mahurin
2019	"Sing Along"	Jumpei Mizusaki
2020	"A Good Look"	Jumpei Mizusaki
2020	"Make Art Not Friends"	Michael Arias
