= Passage du Desir =

2024 studio album by Sturgill Simpson

Studio album by Johnny Blue Skies
- Released: July 12, 2024
- Studio: Abbey Road (London); Clement House (Nashville)
- Genre: Progressive country
- Length: 41:43
- Label: High Top Mountain
- Producer: David R. Ferguson; Sturgill Simpson

Sturgill Simpson chronology
The Ballad of Dood and Juanita (2021)	Passage du Desir (2024)	Mutiny After Midnight (2026)

"There's a contrarian in me that always wants to push against any kind of expectation. If something works, there's a thought in my brain, like, 'No, I'm being told to do that again'. I was in pain. I was pushing the world away."

— Sturgill Simpson on moving to Paris, adopting a stage name, and recording Passage du Desir

Passage du Desir (French for "Passage of Desire") is a studio album by American singer-songwriter Sturgill Simpson, released under the alter ego Johnny Blue Skies. It was released on July 12, 2024, through High Top Mountain as Simpson's eighth total studio album. It received positive reviews from critics. Simpson has stated that this album represents a new phase in his career and was not preceded by promotional singles, but will be supported with a tour under his proper name with Johnny Blue Skies as a special guest.

== Background and recording ==
Simpson chose to adopt a stage name for Passage du Desir in order to remain in line with his stance of only releasing five original studio albums under his actual name; this excludes Cuttin' Grass, Vol. 1 and Vol. 2, as they were bluegrass renditions of previously released material. The name "Johnny Blue Skies" was given to Simpson by a bartender in Lexington, Kentucky, who would introduce Simpson with the moniker whenever he would begin an open mic set at the bar. Simpson previously included "Johnny Blue Skies" in the packaging notes for A Sailor's Guide to Earth, his third studio album, and gave the name a credit in the accompanying film to Sound & Fury, his fourth studio album. Simpson recorded Passage du Desir at Abbey Road Studios in London and Clement House Recording Studios in Nashville, Tennessee.

== Artwork ==
The album's cover features a photograph of the door at the rue du Faubourg Saint-Denis end of the Passage du Desir, a private road in Paris' 10th arrondissement. Simpson discovered the door while exiting a kebab shop across the street. He described it as a "beautiful facade with the old, dilapidated door" and felt the name Passage du Desir was perfect for his album as it "contained the idea". Realizing this, he captured a picture of the door with his phone. The album's title is also shared by a chain of French sex shops. When he later learned of this, Simpson happily responded: "I wanted my songs to be accessible and sexy."

== Release and tour ==
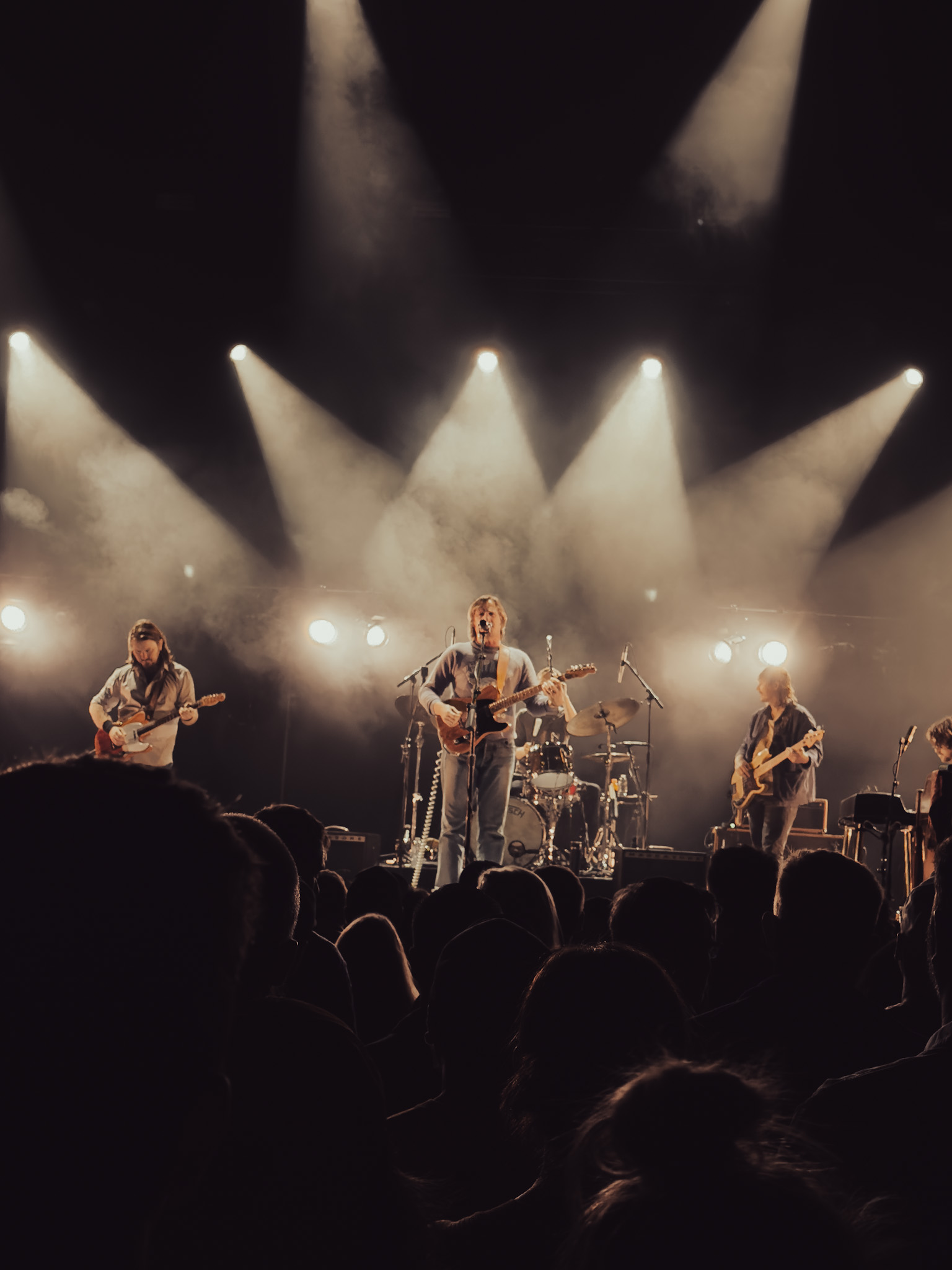
Simpson performing at Boston's MGM Music Hall at Fenway in November 2024

The album was announced on June 5, 2024, alongside the announcement of an extensive fall tour. It would be called the Why Not tour and include band members bassist Kevin Black on bass, keyboardist Robbie Crowell, guitarist Laur Joamets and drummer Miles Miller. Also in this announcement, Simpson revealed he would be releasing all his future albums under the name Johnny Blue Skies but that for the purposes of touring he will use the name Sturgill Simpson.

On August 9, 2024, Simpson performed his first concert in three years at Bimbo's 365 Club in San Francisco, where he played several cover versions. Two days later, he performed at the city's Outside Lands festival. The tour officially began with a show at the Greek Theatre in Los Angeles on September 14, where he again performed ten cover songs, featuring works by artists such as Neil Diamond, the Doors, the Allman Brothers Band, Roy Orbison, When in Rome, and Prince. The tour was distinguished by this inclusion of cover versions and for the three-hour duration of its setlists. Chris Cohen for GQ described the tour as finding Simpson on "an absolutely molten hot streak, playing hours-long sets: No breaks, no talking—just tight harmonies, rousing saxophone solos, some stupidly audacious covers ( "LA Woman"? "Purple Rain"??) and new arrangements of original tunes featuring brain-melting slide-guitar solos from [...] Laur Joamets." The tour included shows at Nashville's Bridgestone Arena, Detroit's Fox Theatre, The Gorge Amphitheatre in George, Washington, as well as two shows at Toronto's Massey Hall and two shows at Chicago's The Salt Shed. The tour concluded with a European leg and its final show at Le Trianon in Paris on March 22, 2025.

A second tour, called Who the F**k Is Johnny Blue Skies?, was announced earlier in February 2025 and officially began on April 5 with a casino show in Durant, Oklahoma. It features a combination of indoor and outdoor performances, including shows at the Hearst Greek Theatre in Berkeley, California; two nights at Denver's Mission Ballroom; the Mesa Amphitheatre in Mesa, Arizona; the BOK Center in Tulsa; and a pair of shows at the ExploreAsheville.com Arena in Asheville, North Carolina. In between, Simpson will make a series festival appearances including Stagecoach Festival in Indio, California, and Bourbon & Beyond in Louisville, Kentucky. He also headlined night 2 at the FairWell Festival in Redmond, Oregon. The tour concluded on September 17 after two nights at Red Rocks Amphitheatre.

== Critical reception ==
Passage du Desir ratings
Aggregate scores
Source	Rating
AnyDecentMusic?	8.0/10
Metacritic	89/100
Review scores
Source	Rating
AllMusic	4.5/5 stars
Beats Per Minute	80%
Mojo	4/5 stars
The Observer	4/5 stars
Paste	9.7/10
Pitchfork	8.5/10
Rolling Stone	4/5 stars
Slant Magazine	4.5/5 stars
Sputnikmusic	4.0/5
Uncut	9/10

According to the review aggregator Metacritic, Passage du Desir received "universal acclaim" based on a weighted average score of 89 out of 100 from 12 critic scores. Editors at AnyDecentMusic? scored this release an 8.0 out of 10, aggregating 8 reviews.

Writing for Beats Per Minute, John Amen commented, "Simpson's voice is more resonant than ever, his melodic sensibilities on full display. Over eight songs and 41 minutes, he forges sublime and heartfelt work, evoking the epic poles of experience: loneliness and belonging, forlornness and gratitude, faith and doubt". Andrew Sacher of BrooklynVegan wrote that on this release, "every song brings something unique to the table" and "this one finds him embracing the country, blues, soul, and Southern rock of the late 60s/early 70s, with songs that scratch the same itch as stuff like the Allman Brothers, The Band, and Gram Parsons". At Consequence of Sound, Mary Siroky called this "a beautifully layered LP" that mixes genres and moods as diverse as desire and humor that leaves listeners "with the sense that Simpson is just warming up". Writing for Glide Magazine, Shawn Donohue stated that this release includes all of "Simpson's core", with "the mixing of outlaw-based country with classic Nashville pop and slightly psychedelic flourishes", with particularly strong production.

In the Lexington Herald-Leader, Walter Tunis called this "a very Simpson-sounding work" that sounds like the singer's mid-2010 releases, resulting in "a fine slice of often elegant heart-on-the-sleeve music". Discussing Passage du Desir in No Depression, Jon Young concluded, "Eloquent and unsparing, Passage du Desir is a potent cocktail of tender beauty and profound melancholy. Whatever else Sturgill Simpson has planned for Johnny Blue Skies, the two of them are off to an unforgettable start". The Observer's Neil Spencer scored this release 4 out of 5 stars, calling it "a deeply emotional journey", comparing the sound to A Sailor's Guide to Earth.

Editors at Paste chose this as a Paste Pick, where it was rated a 9.7 out of 10 and critic Matt Mitchell called it "an introduction and a rebirth" where "Simpson remains transient but yearns to be still" and "Simpson does his best to wander through the muck of life's greatest romances and fundamental truths for as long as his feet can muster the steps". Editors at Pitchfork scored this release 8.5 out of 10, declaring it among the Best New Music and critic Stephen M. Deusner called it an "outstanding album [that] expertly balances cosmic and outlaw country" and praised the relatability of the lyrics.Rolling Stone's Jon Blistein scored this work 4 out of 5 stars, calling this "some of [Simpson's] deepest music yet" with lyrics that are "heavy with heartache, burdened by past mistakes, adrift in impossible dreams, and desperate for relief" with "music that surrounds Simpson's voice is rich and dynamic, filled with moments of genuine musical delight that act as a kind of counterweight".

Writing for Slant Magazine, Steve Erickson gave this release 4 out of 5 stars, pointing out the "classic rock sound" that recalls 1970s country and rock, with songs that have various moods, "darker undercurrent[s]", and "sci-fi imagery [that] crashes against the notion of mortality". Jacob Paul Nielsen of Stereogum stated that "shrouded in the new identity of Johnny Blues Skies, Simpson has crafted some of his best songs to date", comparing the use of alter egos to David Bowie and Bob Dylan. Sowing of Sputnikmusic rated Passage du Desir a 4.0 out of 5, stating that "it feels like [Simpson's] most personal and poignant release in eight years". At Uproxx, Steven Hyden emphasized the continuity with previous Simpson work due to having the backing band he had in the 2010s, stating that "in true paradoxical Sturgill Simpson fashion, being someone else has given him permission to be more like himself", resulting in "the most patio-friendly music of Sturgill's music career".

=== Year-end lists ===
Select year-end rankings for Passage du Desir
Publication/critic	Accolade	Rank	Ref.
Consequence	50 Best Albums of 2024	4	
MOJO	75 Best Albums of 2024	57	
Uncut	80 Best Albums of 2024	17	

== Track listing ==
All tracks are written by JS Simpson.

No.	Title	Length
1.	"Swamp of Sadness"	4:58
2.	"If the Sun Never Rises Again"	4:47
3.	"Scooter Blues"	3:38
4.	"Jupiter's Faerie"	7:24
5.	"Who I Am"	3:07
6.	"Right Kind of Dream"	5:17
7.	"Mint Tea"	3:37
8.	"One for the Road"	8:55
Total length:		41:43

== Personnel ==
- Johnny Blue Skies – guitar, vocals, mixing (at The Butcher Shack, Goodlettsville, Tennessee), production, photography
- Jake Bugg – additional acoustic guitar
- Matt Combs – strings
- Dan Dugmore – pedal steel guitar
- Fred Eltringham – drums, percussion
- Sierra Hull – mandolin, sirens
- Steve Mackey – bass guitar
- Mike Rojas – keyboards, melodica, accordion
- David R. Ferguson – production, mixing (at The Butcher Shack)
- Sean Sullivan – engineering
- Cameron Davidson – assistant engineering
- Ed Farrell – assistant engineering
- David Glasser – mastering (at Air Show Mastering)
- Dreez Nutz – photography
- Fetzer Design – art direction

== Charts ==
Chart performance for Passage du Desir
Chart (2024)	Peak position
Dutch Albums (Album Top 100)	76
Scottish Albums (OCC)	75
UK Album Downloads (OCC)	48
UK Americana Albums (OCC)	12
UK Country Albums (OCC)	5
UK Independent Albums (OCC)	20
US Billboard 200	29
US Top Country Albums (Billboard)	9
US Top Rock & Alternative Albums (Billboard)	8

== See also ==
- 2024 in American music
- 2024 in country music
- List of 2024 albums
