= List of Billboard number-one Americana/folk albums of the 2020s =

Americana/Folk Albums (formerly Folk Albums) is a music chart published weekly by Billboard magazine which ranks the top selling "current releases by traditional folk artists, as well as appropriate titles by acoustic-based singer-songwriters" in the United States. The chart debuted on the issue dated December 5, 2009, as a 15-position chart with its first number-one title being the Bob Dylan Christmas album Christmas in the Heart.

It has since expanded to a 25-position chart. In May 2016, Billboard renamed the chart to "Americana/Folk Albums", with the increasing popularity of Americana music, giving more recognition to acts which lean more towards Americana than folk.

== List of number-one albums ==
These are the albums which have reached number one on the folk albums chart listed in chronological order. Note that Billboard publishes charts with an issue date approximately 3 days in advance.

Issue date	Album	Artist(s)	Weeks at number one	Ref.
2020
February 15	The Unraveling	Drive-By Truckers	1	
February 22	Texas Sun EP	Khruangbin and Leon Bridges	1	
February 29	Traveller	Chris Stapleton	2	
March 14	American Standard	James Taylor	3	
April 4	Traveller	Chris Stapleton	2	
April 18	John Prine	John Prine	1	
April 25	Traveller	Chris Stapleton	5	
May 30	Reunions	Jason Isbell and the 400 Unit	1	
June 6	Traveller	Chris Stapleton	1	
June 13	Life on the Flip Side	Jimmy Buffett	1	
June 20	Traveller	Chris Stapleton	2	
July 4	Rough and Rowdy Ways	Bob Dylan	2	
July 18	First Rose of Spring	Willie Nelson	1	
July 25	Traveller	Chris Stapleton	1	
August 1	Gaslighter	The Chicks	3	
August 22	Traveller	Chris Stapleton	2	
September 5	Down in the Weeds, Where the World Once Was	Bright Eyes	1	
September 12	Traveller	Chris Stapleton	3	
October 3	Long Violent History	Tyler Childers	1	
October 10	Traveller	Chris Stapleton	3	
October 31	Cuttin' Grass, Vol. 1: The Butcher Shoppe Sessions	Sturgill Simpson	1	
November 7	Letter to You	Bruce Springsteen	3	
November 28	Starting Over	Chris Stapleton	8	
2021
January 23	Greenfields: The Gibb Brothers Songbook, Vol. I	Barry Gibb and Friends	1	
January 30	Starting Over	Chris Stapleton	6	
March 13	Little Oblivions	Julien Baker	1	
March 20	Starting Over	Chris Stapleton	2	
April 3	Shore	Fleet Foxes	1	
April 10	Starting Over	Chris Stapleton	1	
April 17	Cuttin' Grass, Vol. 2: The Cowboy Arms Sessions	Sturgill Simpson	1	
April 24	Starting Over	Chris Stapleton	4	
May 22	The Marfa Tapes	Jack Ingram, Miranda Lambert and Jon Randall	1	
May 29	Delta Kream	The Black Keys	1	
June 5	Long Lost	Lord Huron	1	
June 12	You Hear Georgia	Blackberry Smoke	1	
June 19	Starting Over	Chris Stapleton	2	
July 3	Traveller	Chris Stapleton	4	
July 31	Sob Rock	John Mayer	1	
August 7	Gold-Diggers Sound	Leon Bridges	1	
August 14	Sob Rock	John Mayer	1	
August 21	Traveller	Chris Stapleton	1	
August 28	Pressure Machine	The Killers	1	
September 4	The Ballad of Dood and Juanita	Sturgill Simpson	1	
September 11	Traveller	Chris Stapleton	2	
September 25	Star-Crossed	Kacey Musgraves	3	
October 16	In These Silent Days	Brandi Carlile	1	
October 23	Starting Over	Chris Stapleton	5	
November 27	Traveller	Chris Stapleton	1	
December 4	Raise the Roof	Robert Plant and Alison Krauss	1	
December 11	Starting Over	Chris Stapleton	2	
December 25	Barn	Neil Young and Crazy Horse	1	
2022
January 1	Traveller	Chris Stapleton	1	
January 8	Starting Over	Chris Stapleton	3	
January 29	Brightside	The Lumineers	1	
February 5	Traveller	Chris Stapleton	3	
February 26	Dragon New Warm Mountain I Believe in You	Big Thief	1	
March 5	Texas Moon	Khruangbin & Leon Bridges	1	
March 12	The Ballad of Dood and Juanita	Sturgill Simpson	1	
March 19	Run, Rose, Run	Dolly Parton	1	
March 26	Traveller	Chris Stapleton	3	
April 16	Starting Over	Chris Stapleton	1	
April 23	Chloë and the Next 20th Century	Father John Misty	1	
April 30	Starting Over	Chris Stapleton	1	
May 7	Just Like That...	Bonnie Raitt	1	
May 14	Starting Over	Chris Stapleton	2	
May 28	Dropout Boogie	The Black Keys	1	
June 4	American Heartbreak	Zach Bryan	10	
August 6	Entering Heaven Alive	Jack White	1	
August 13	American Heartbreak	Zach Bryan	34	
2023
April 15	The Record	Boygenius	1	
April 22	American Heartbreak	Zach Bryan	9	
June 24	Stick Season	Noah Kahan	2	
July 8	American Heartbreak	Zach Bryan	8	
September 2	Unreal Unearth	Hozier	1	
September 9	Zach Bryan	Zach Bryan	5	
October 14	Autumn Variations	Ed Sheeran	1	
October 21	Zach Bryan	Zach Bryan	4	
November 18	Equal Strain on All Parts	Jimmy Buffett	1	
November 25	Higher	Chris Stapleton	1	
December 2	Zach Bryan	Zach Bryan	2	
December 16	Stick Season	Noah Kahan	1	
December 23	Zach Bryan	Zach Bryan	1	
December 30	Stick Season	Noah Kahan	13	
2024
March 30	Deeper Well	Kacey Musgraves	1	
April 6	Stick Season	Noah Kahan	1	
April 13	Cowboy Carter	Beyoncé	6	
May 25	Stick Season	Noah Kahan	3	
June 15	Where I've Been, Isn't Where I'm Going	Shaboozey	1	
June 22	Stick Season	Noah Kahan	2	
July 6	Where I've Been, Isn't Where I'm Going	Shaboozey	2	
July 20	The Great American Bar Scene	Zach Bryan	10	
September 28	Stick Season	Noah Kahan	10	
December 7	The Great American Bar Scene	Zach Bryan	1	
December 14	Stick Season	Noah Kahan	17	
2025
April 12	Forever Is a Feeling	Lucy Dacus	1	
April 19	Stick Season	Noah Kahan	1	
April 26	Sable, Fable	Bon Iver	1	
May 3	Stick Season	Noah Kahan	1	
May 10	Where I've Been, Isn't Where I'm Going	Shaboozey	13	
August 9	Snipe Hunter	Tyler Childers	1	
August 16	Where I've Been, Isn't Where I'm Going	Shaboozey	3	
September 6	Stick Season	Noah Kahan	9	
November 8	Returning to Myself	Brandi Carlile	1	
November 15	Stick Season	Noah Kahan	4	
December 13	West Texas Degenerate	Treaty Oak Revival	1	
December 20	Stick Season	Noah Kahan	5	
2026
January 24	With Heaven on Top	Zach Bryan	3	
February 14	Stick Season	Noah Kahan	3	
March 7	Prizefighter	Mumford & Sons	1	
March 14	Stick Season	Noah Kahan	2	
March 28	Mutiny After Midnight	Johnny Blue Skies & the Dark Clouds	1	
April 4	Stick Season	Noah Kahan	5	
May 9	The Great Divide	Noah Kahan	12	
August 1	Daughter from Hell	Gracie Abrams	1	
August 8	The Great Divide	Noah Kahan	3	
August 29	Lost Weekend	Phoebe Bridgers	1	
September 5	The Great Divide	Noah Kahan	8	
October 31	Young Manhood and Other Donatable Organs	Zach Bryan	1	
November 7	The Great Divide	Noah Kahan	3	
