= When in Rome =

When in Rome may refer to:

- "When in Rome, do as the Romans do", a saying attributed to Ambrose

== Film and television ==
- When in Rome (1952 film), an American comedy drama starring Van Johnson and Paul Douglas
- When in Rome (2002 film), an American direct-to-video film starring Mary-Kate and Ashley Olsen
- When in Rome (2010 film), an American romantic comedy starring Kristen Bell and Josh Duhamel
- "When in Rome..." (And Just Like That...), a 2021 TV episode
- "When in Rome..." (The Suite Life on Deck), a 2009 TV episode

== Literature ==
- When in Rome (novel), a 1970 Roderick Alleyn mystery by Ngaio Marsh
- Catwoman: When in Rome, a 2004 DC Comics miniseries
- "When in Rome", a poem by Mari Evans

== Music ==
- When in Rome (band), an English synth-pop/new wave trio

=== Albums ===
- When in Rome (Cliff Richard album), 1965
- When in Rome (When in Rome album), 1988
- When in Rome (Penguin Cafe Orchestra album), 1988
- When in Rome 2007, a live DVD by Genesis, 2008

=== Songs ===
- "When in Rome" (song), by Dove Cameron, 2026
- "When in Rome (Do the Jerk)", by Rocket from the Crypt, 1998
- "When in Rome", by Billy Joel from Storm Front, 1989
- "When in Rome", by Mac Miller from GO:OD AM, 2015
- "When in Rome", by Mudhoney from Piece of Cake, 1992
- "When in Rome", by Nickel Creek from Why Should the Fire Die?, 2005
- "When in Rome", by Phil Ochs from Tape from California, 1968
- "When in Rome", by Supagroup, 2001
- "When in Rome", by Travis Tritt from My Honky Tonk History, 2004
- "When in Rome (I Do as the Romans Do)", by Barbra Streisand from People, 1964

== Other uses ==
- When in Rome, a comedy tour by Alex Horne

== See also ==
- When in Rome, Kill Me, a 1989 album by Cud
- When in Rome Do as the Vandals, a 1984 album by the Vandals
