= Cuttin' Grass, Vol. 1: The Butcher Shoppe Sessions =

Studio album by Sturgill Simpson
- Released: October 16, 2020
- Recorded: 2020
- Studio: Butcher Shoppe (Nashville, Tennessee)
- Genre: Bluegrass
- Length: 55:07
- Label: High Top Mountain; Thirty Tigers
- Producer: David Ferguson; Sturgill Simpson

Sturgill Simpson chronology
Sound & Fury (2019)	Cuttin' Grass, Vol. 1: The Butcher Shoppe Sessions (2020)	Cuttin' Grass, Vol. 2: The Cowboy Arms Sessions (2020)

Cuttin' Grass, Vol. 1: The Butcher Shoppe Sessions is the fifth album by American country musician Sturgill Simpson, released on October 16, 2020, through Simpson's own label, High Top Mountain. The album consists of bluegrass renditions of songs from elsewhere in his catalog.

== Content ==
Simpson had expressed his desire to record a bluegrass album as early as 2017. Both volumes were recorded earlier in 2020 after Simpson had recovered from COVID-19; he and the musicians on the record performed a livestreamed concert at the Ryman Auditorium in Nashville on June 5, 2020, as a promise to fans who raised nearly $250,000 for COVID-19 relief.

Recorded at the Butcher Shoppe recording studio, the album includes various bluegrass musicians such as guitarists Tim O'Brien and Mark Howard, banjoist Scott Vestal, fiddler Stuart Duncan, and mandolinist/backing vocalist Sierra Hull. The album consists of bluegrass re-recordings of previous songs in Simpson's catalog, including not only those from his solo albums, but also those from the band Sunday Valley, of which he was a member prior to beginning his solo career.

== Critical reception ==
Stephen M. Deusner of Pitchfork rated the album 7.4 out of 10, stating that "As a country artist, Simpson is determinedly subversive; as a bluegrass artist, he’s incredibly conservative. There are none of the abrupt stylistic changes that made [A Sailor's Guide to Earth] sound as big as the world and none of the sonic experiments that made [Metamodern Sounds in Country Music] such a trip. Simpson can’t quite sustain a double album in this style, and Cuttin' Grass loses some steam toward the end. However, there are more than enough bracing moments here to make you wonder what Volume 2 will sound like". Stephen Thomas Erlewine gave the album 4.5 out of 5 in the review for AllMusic, concluding that "Part of Simpson's appeal lies in how he blurs genres, so it's a bit ironic that this single-minded collection is one of his best records, but it is: it's an album where the joy in the music's creation is palpable and infectious." Ross Jones of Holler rated the album 8 out of 10, writing that Simpson “doesn’t just reimagine his songs, he unveils their therapeutic powers at the most essential time,” and praising the record as cohesive and emotionally resonant.

== Track listing ==
All tracks are written by All songs written by Sturgill Simpson, except “Long White Line” written by Buford Abner.

No.	Title	Originally Featured On	Length
1.	"All Around You"	A Sailor's Guide to Earth	3:09
2.	"All the Pretty Colors"	To The Wind and On To Heaven (Sunday Valley)	2:18
3.	"Breaker's Roar"	A Sailor's Guide to Earth	2:29
4.	"I Don't Mind"	To The Wind and On To Heaven (Sunday Valley)	4:29
5.	"I Wonder"	To The Wind and On To Heaven (Sunday Valley)	3:14
6.	"Just Let Go"	Metamodern Sounds in Country Music	3:02
7.	"Life Ain't Fair and the World Is Mean"	High Top Mountain	2:00
8.	"A Little Light"	Metamodern Sounds in Country Music	1:44
9.	"Life of Sin"	Metamodern Sounds in Country Music	2:17
10.	"Long White Line"	Metamodern Sounds in Country Music	2:21
11.	"Living the Dream"	Metamodern Sounds in Country Music	2:30
12.	"Old King Coal"	High Top Mountain	2:52
13.	"Rail Road of Sin"	High Top Mountain	2:12
14.	"Sitting Here Without You"	High Top Mountain	1:55
15.	"Sometimes Wine"	To Wind and On To Heaven (Sunday Valley)	3:55
16.	"The Storm"	High Top Mountain	2:31
17.	"Time After All"	High Top Mountain	2:14
18.	"Turtles All the Way Down"	Metamodern Sounds in Country Music	2:18
19.	"Voices"	Metamodern Sounds in Country Music	3:37
20.	"Water in a Well"	High Top Mountain	3:36
Total length:			55:07

== Personnel ==
Per Bandcamp.

Musical

- Mike Bub – upright bass
- Stuart Duncan – fiddle, background vocals
- Mark Howard – background vocals, lead guitar, rhythm guitar
- Sierra Hull – mandolin, background vocals
- Miles Miller – percussion, background vocals
- Tim O'Brien – background vocals, lead guitar, rhythm guitar
- Sturgill Simpson – vocals, rhythm guitar
- Scott Vestal – banjo, background vocals

Technical

- Richard Dodd – mastering
- David Ferguson – producer, engineer, mixer
- Sturgill Simpson – producer
- Sean Sullivan – engineer, mixer

== Charts ==
=== Weekly charts ===
Weekly chart performance for Cuttin' Grass, Vol. 1: The Butcher Shoppe Sessions
Chart (2020)	Peak position
US Billboard 200	24
US Top Country Albums (Billboard)	2

=== Year-end charts ===
2020 Year-end chart performance for Cuttin' Grass, Vol. 1: The Butcher Shoppe Sessions
Chart (2020)	Position
US Top Country Albums (Billboard)	96

2021 Year-end chart performance for Cuttin' Grass, Vol. 1: The Butcher Shoppe Sessions
Chart (2021)	Position
US Top Country Albums (Billboard)	80
