= Sealed with a kiss (disambiguation) =

"Sealed with a Kiss" is a song made popular by Brian Hyland and Jason Donovan.

Sealed with a Kiss may also refer to:

- Sealed with a Kiss (Bobby Vinton album), a 1972 album by Bobby Vinton
- Sealed with a Kiss (The Eyeliners album), a 2001 album by The Eyeliners
- Sealed with a Kiss, a 1962 album by Brian Hyland
- Romeo & Juliet: Sealed with a Kiss, a 2006 American animated film by Phil Nibbelink
- Sealed with a Kiss (2011 TV series), a 2011 Chinese television series
- Sealed with a Kiss (2015 TV series), a 2015 Singaporean television series

The acronym SWAK may refer to:

- "SWAK", episode of the American police television series NCIS (season 2)
- "S.W.A.K.", episode of the American animated TV series Rocko's Modern Life
- Swak na Swak, a Philippine television show
- Miswak, a teeth-cleaning twig

== See also ==
- Seal It with a Kiss (disambiguation)
