= No Apologies (The Eyeliners album) =

Studio album by the Eyeliners
- Released: 2005
- Label: Blackheart

The Eyeliners chronology
Sealed with a Kiss (2001)	No Apologies (2005)

No Apologies is an album by the Eyeliners, released on 5 April 2005 by Blackheart Records. It includes a covers of When in Rome's 1988 song "The Promise" and Eddie and the Hot Rods' 1977 song "Do Anything You Wanna Do". Joan Jett and Kenny Laguna produced this album for the girls, and Joan guested on the track "Destroy" and made a cameo appearance in the music video.

== Track listing ==
1. "Think of Me" – 3:08
2. "Destroy" – 3:23
3. "All I Wanted" – 2:55
4. "The Promise" – 3:25
5. "Voice of Reason" – 3:02
6. "Can't Get Enough" – 2:24
7. "Bleed Til Today" – 2:43
8. "Next Big Thing" – 2:43
9. "No Apologies" – 3:18
10. "Do Anything You Wanna Do" – 2:26
11. "Hanging On" – 3:30
12. "Disappointed" – 2:48
13. "Mea Culpa" – 3:39
14. "Streets and Avenues" – 2:52
