= The Eyeliners =

American pop punk band

- Also known as: Psychodrama
- Origin: Albuquerque, New Mexico, U.S.
- Genres: Pop punk; alternative rock
- Years active: 1995–2005
- Labels: Panic Button; Lookout; Sympathy for the Record Industry; Blackheart
- Past members: Lisa Baca; Laura Baca; Angela "Gel" Baca

The Eyeliners were an all-female American pop punk band from Albuquerque, New Mexico.

== History ==
The band formed in 1995 under the name Psychodrama by three sisters, guitarist Gel, bassist Lisa, and singer Laura Baca. The three auditioned both male and female drummers, but couldn’t find one suitable for their planned style of music. Laura began experimenting with the drum set they had been using for auditions, and soon picked up the drumbeat despite never having played the instrument. About halfway through the rendition of the song, she started to sing along. The sisters stopped auditioning and Laura became both lead vocalist and drummer.

The band played their first show under the name Psychodrama and released a single, "Vivid". In 1996 the sisters changed their band name to The Eyeliners while touring the west coast, as more appropriate for their musical style.

Under their new name, the group has released EPs on Sympathy for the Record Industry followed by albums on Lookout Records in 2000 and 2001. The 2005 album No Apologies (Blackheart Records) includes a cover of When in Rome's 1988 song "The Promise."

A few months later, The Eyeliners played a show with the Red Aunts. Red Aunts frontwoman, Terri Wahl, introduced them to owner of Sympathy For the Record Industry, Long Gone John. Soon, the Eyeliners debut CD and 7” were released. Two more seven inches (“Do The Zombie” and “Rock N Roll, Baby”) followed on Sympathy for the Record Industry over the next couple of years.

== Members ==
- Lisa Baca – bass guitar, backing vocals
- Laura Baca – drums, vocals
- Gel Baca – guitar, backing vocals

=== Touring members ===
- Ryan Seaman – drums

== Discography ==
=== Singles ===
- "Broke My Heart" b/w "Too Late" (Sympathy for the Record Industry, 1997)
- "Do The Zombie" b/w "She's Fallen In Love With A Monster Man" (Sympathy for the Record Industry, 1997)
- "Rock N Roll, Baby!" b/w "Bad Attitude" (Sympathy for the Record Industry, 1998)

=== Albums ===
- Confidential (Sympathy for the Record Industry, 1997)
- Here Comes Trouble (Lookout/Panic Button, 2000)
- Sealed with a Kiss (Lookout/Panic Button, 2001)
- No Apologies (Blackheart, 2005)

=== Compilations ===
- The First Four Years (PKR, 2003)

=== Compilation and Soundtrack appearances ===
- Punk...It's All About The Orchis Factor (Suburban Home, 1996) – "Tamara"
- Girl Crazy! (Remedial, 1998) – "You Lose"
- Alright, This Time, Just The Girls (Sympathy for the Record Industry, 1999) – "Six Years"
- You Call This Music?! Vol. One (Geykido Comet, 2000) – "Rock-N-Roll, Baby!"
- Lookout! Freakout Episode 2 (Lookout!, 2001) – "Wishing On A Star"
- Boy's Lie: A Bunch Of Punk Rock Girl Bands! (Lookout!, 2001) – "Here Comes Trouble"
- Plea For Peace Take Action (Sub City/Asian Man, 2001) – "See You Tonight"
- Vans Warped Tour (2002 Tour Compilation) 2XCD (SideOneDummy, 2002) – "I Could Never Hate You"
- 3 Chord Rocket Science (Suckerpunch, 2002) – "Ooh Way Out"
- Pounded (Springman, 2002) – "Finished With You"
- Breaking In The Scene (Wipe-Out, 2002) – "See You Tonight" [as Eyeliner]
- Vans Warped Tour '03 CD Sampler EP (Vans, 2003) – "Sealed With A Kiss"
- Fat City Presents Bands We Like Vol. 1 (Combat Zone, 2003) – "Bad Attitude"
- Liberation (Songs To Benefit PETA) (Fat Wreck Chords, 2003) – "I Could Never Hate You"
- CMJ On Air Vol. 008 (College Music Journal, 2005) – "Destroy"
- CMJ New Music Issue 132 (College Music Journal, 2005) – "Destroy"
- Amp Sampler volume 16-Disc A (Amp Magazine, 2005) – "Destroy"
- Gritty In Pink-Shiragirl's All-Girl Stage Crew Compilation Vol. 2 (Play-A-Grrrl, 2006) – "Think Of Me"
- Endless Bummer (Original Motion Picture Soundtrack) (Blackheart, 2009) – "The Promise"
- Blackheart Records Sampler CDr (Blackheart, 2013) – "Think Of Me", "All I Wanted"
- Blackheart Records 2013 Sampler MP3 (Blackheart, 2013) – "Destroy"
- Skratch Magazine And Hellkats: L.A. Presents Comp V.30 2XCD (Skratch Magazine) – "Think Of Me"
