= Eyeliner (disambiguation) =

Eye liner is a cosmetic used to define the eyes.

Eyeliner may also refer to:

- Eyeliner (band), an Indonesian rock band (1998-now)
- Eyeliner (UK band), a British rock band (2008-now)
- The Eyeliners, a punk rock band from Albuquerque, New Mexico, US
- Musion Eyeliner, a high-definition video projection system for stage productions
