= Confidential (disambiguation) =

Confidential may refer to:

- Confidential, a level of classified information
- Confidential (1935 film), a film directed by Edward L. Cahn
- Confidential (1986 film), a film directed by Bruce Pittman
- "Confidential", a 1959 song by the Fleetwoods
- "Confidential", a song written by the Pet Shop Boys and recorded by Tina Turner on her 1996 album Wildest Dreams
- Confidential (magazine), a gossip magazine
- Confidențial (Anda Adam album), 2005
- Confidential (Eyeliners album), 1997
- Confidential (M-1 album), 2006
- Confidential (High Contrast album), 2009
- Confidential (TV series), an Australian weekly entertainment news show
- Confidential, an Indian film series, including
  - London Confidential (2020)
  - Lahore Confidential (2021)

== See also ==
- Confidentiality
