= The Broken Spoke =

Dance hall and restaurant in Austin, Texas

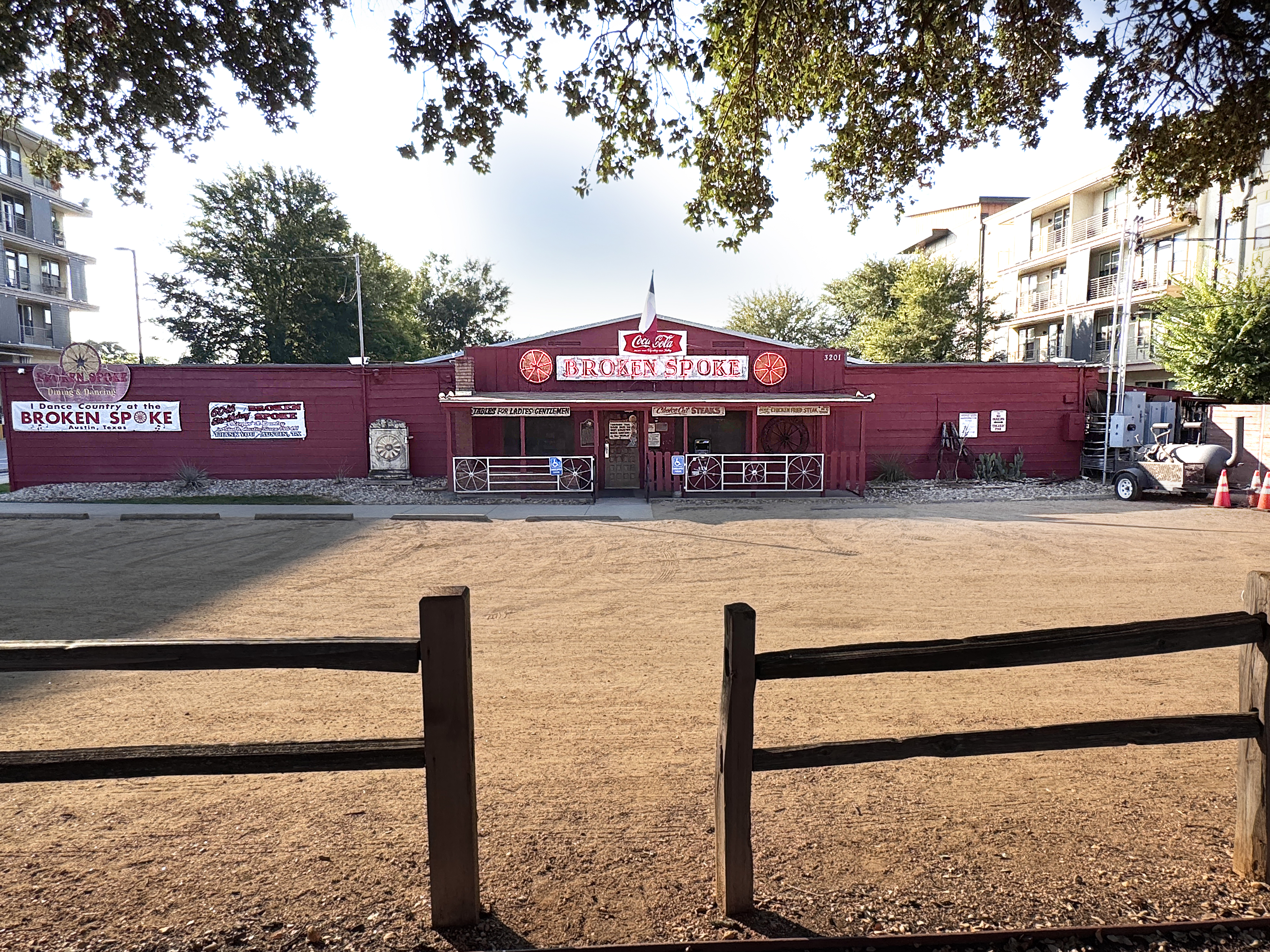
- Exterior view of The Broken Spoke, a honky-tonk, dance hall, and restaurant on South Lamar Boulevard in Austin, Texas. Photo taken in 2025.
- Interactive map of The Broken Spoke
- Address: 3201 South Lamar Boulevard, Austin, Texas
- Location: Austin, Texas, United States
- Coordinates: 30.2409°N 97.7852°W
- Owner: White/Peacock family
- Type: Honky-tonk, dance hall, restaurant
- Event: Country music

Construction
- Opened: November 1964

Website
- brokenspokeaustintx.net

The Broken Spoke is a honky-tonk, dance hall, and restaurant in Austin, Texas. Opened in 1964 by James and Annetta White, it is one of the city’s longest-standing country music venues.

== History ==
The Broken Spoke opened in 1964 on South Lamar Boulevard, in an area then considered the edge of town. James White, then in his twenties, set out to create a traditional Texas dance hall where country music and dancing would be the focus. The building has changed little since then, with neon lights, low ceilings, and red-checkered tablecloths remaining part of the atmosphere.

In November 2024, the Broken Spoke celebrated its 60th anniversary with a month of live music, dance lessons, and community recognition. FOX 7 Austin reported it kicked off with music and two-step lessons, and City Councilmember Ryan Alter declared November 10 “Broken Spoke Day.” CBS Austin also noted the milestone weekend featured musical performances and commentary on the venue's lasting presence in Austin’s cultural fabric.

== Music ==
Over the years, the Broken Spoke has hosted well-known country acts including Willie Nelson, Kris Kristofferson, George Strait, Dolly Parton, Garth Brooks, The Chicks, and Sturgill Simpson. Several performed there before their wider fame.

The Texas Historical Commission marker at the site highlights appearances by Bob Wills, Roy Acuff, and Ernest Tubb, underscoring the hall’s connection to earlier generations of country performers.

== Dancing and atmosphere ==
The Broken Spoke remains active as a dance venue. Two-step and swing dance lessons are offered several nights a week, appealing to both longtime patrons and newcomers.

A defining feature is its "Tourist Trap Room," a small space showcasing photos, hats, and memorabilia from decades of visiting musicians and public figures.

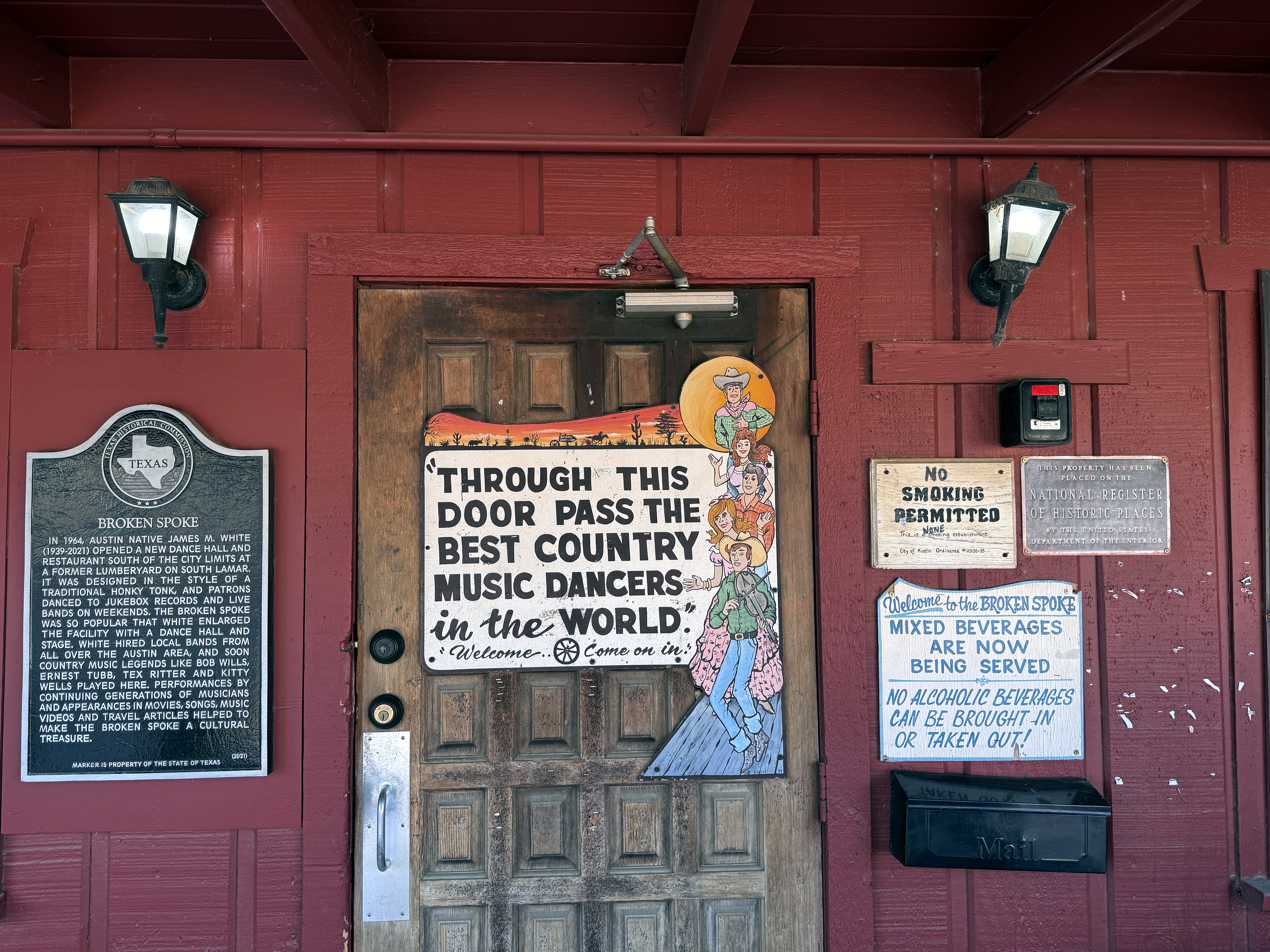
Entrance to The Broken Spoke in Austin, Texas, featuring signs including “Through this door pass the best country music dancers in the world” and regulatory notices.

Food is also part of the appeal. Eater Austin noted that the venue “proclaims to be ... serving the best chicken fried steak in Texas,” a claim tied to its longstanding menu and reputation.

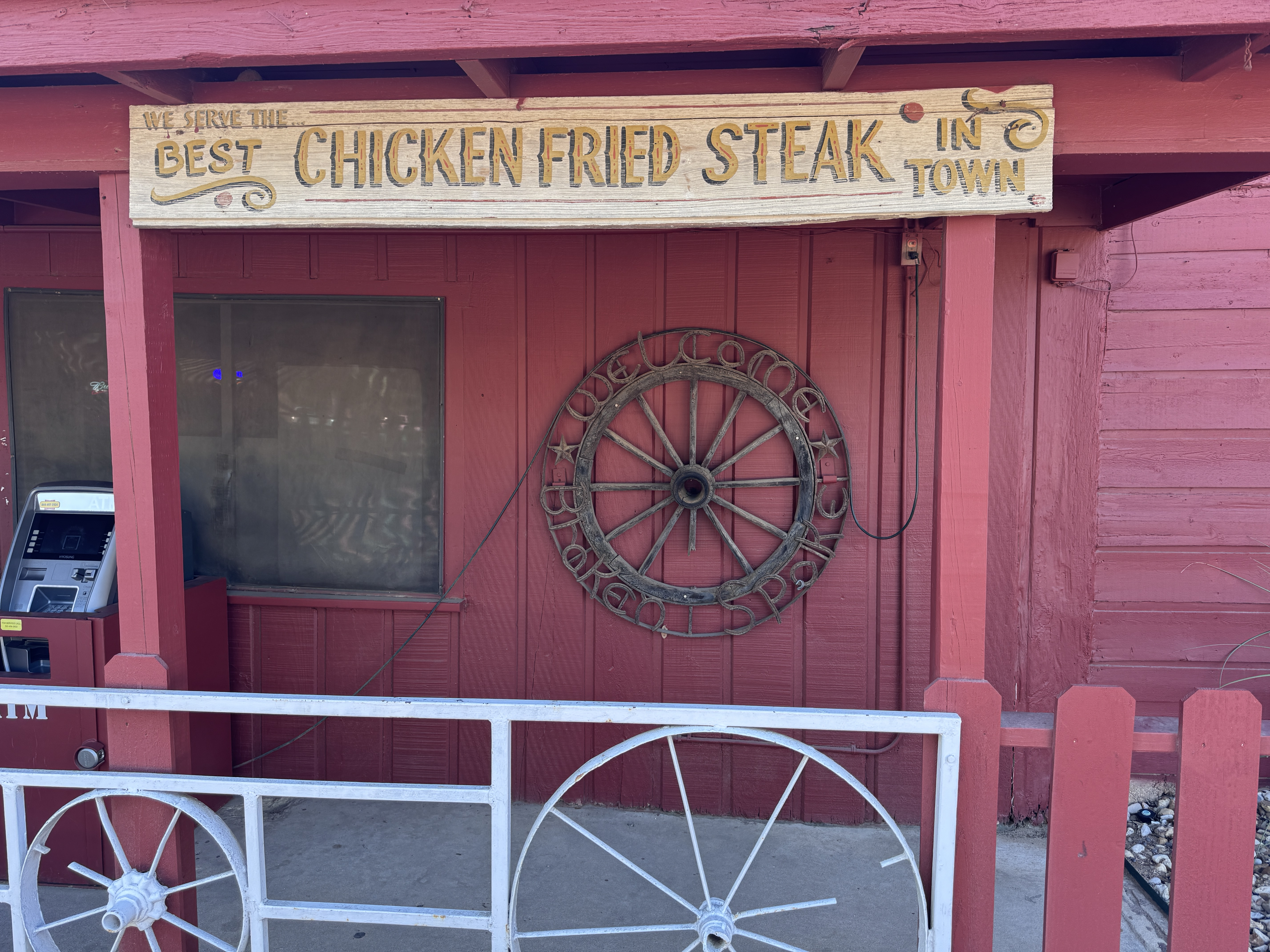
Best Chicken Fried Steak sign at The Broken Spoke in Austin, Texas

== Family ownership ==
James White oversaw the Broken Spoke until his death in 2021. His wife Annetta, daughters Terri White and Ginny White-Peacock, and son-in-law Michael Peacock now operate the venue.

== Recognition ==
In April 2023, the Texas Historical Commission designated the Broken Spoke as a Recorded Texas Historic Landmark, and a marker was placed at the site to honor its cultural significance.

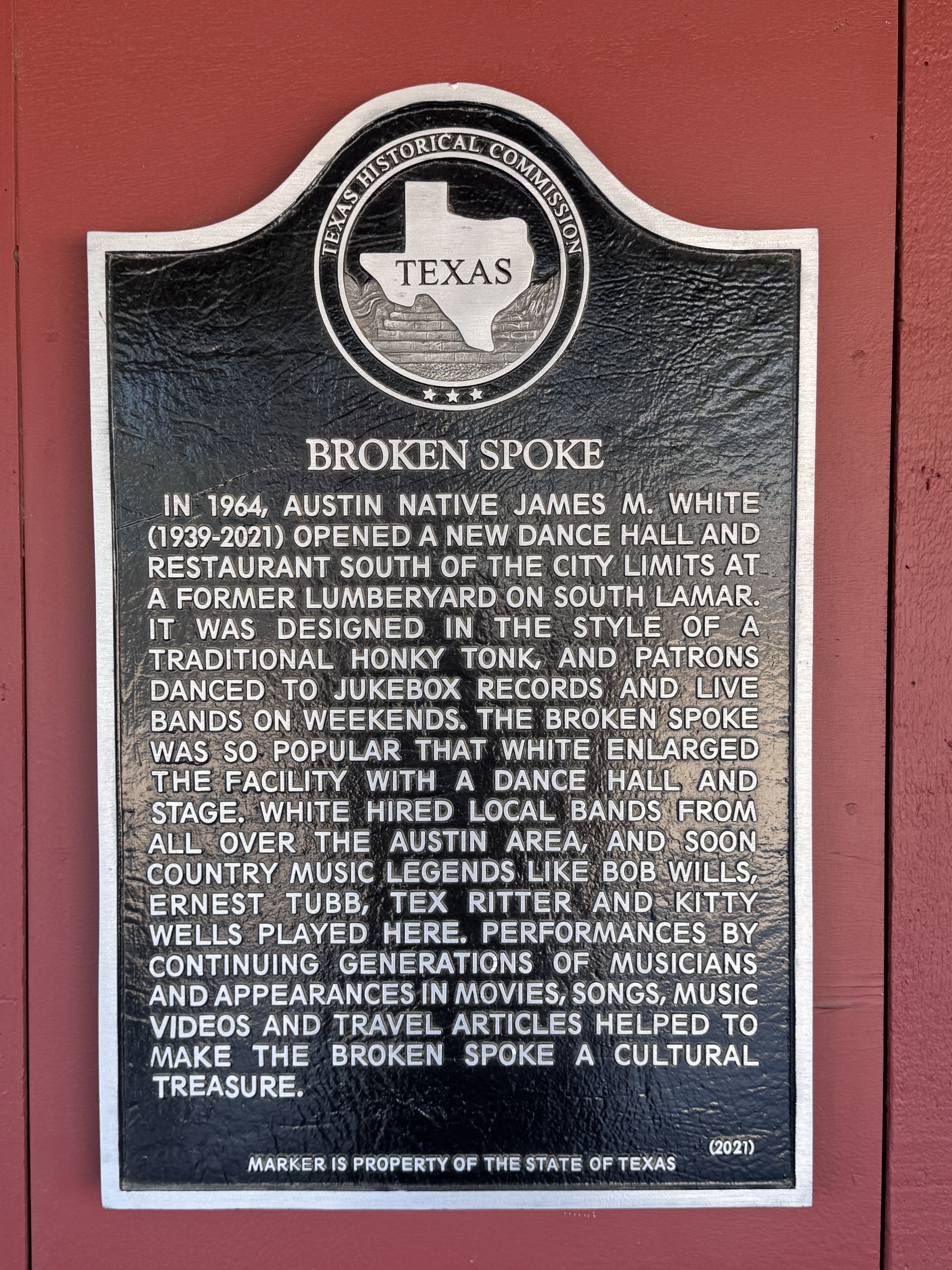
Texas Historical Commission marker installed at The Broken Spoke in Austin, Texas.
