= Turtles All the Way Down =

Turtles All the Way Down may refer to:

- "Turtles all the way down", an expression of the infinite regress problem
- "Turtles All the Way Down" (Awake), the thirteenth and final episode of the American television police procedural fantasy drama Awake
- Turtles All the Way Down (novel), a 2017 novel by John Green
- Turtles All the Way Down (film), a 2024 film based on the novel
- "Turtles All the Way Down" (song), a 2014 song by American country music artist Sturgill Simpson
- "Turtles All The Way Down", a 2009 song by metalcore band Every Time I Die on the album New Junk Aesthetic
- "All the Way Down", an episode of Futurama that references the expression.
