= Heaven Knows (When in Rome song) =

Single by When in Rome

from the album When in Rome
- Released: 1988 (U.S.) / 1989 (UK)
- Recorded: 1988
- Genre: Synth-pop
- Length: 3:44
- Label: Virgin
- Songwriters: Clive Farrington, Michael Floreale, Andrew Mann
- Producer: Richard Burgess

When in Rome singles chronology
"The Promise" (1988)	"Heaven Knows" (1988)	"Everything" (1989)

"Heaven Knows" is a song by British band When in Rome, released in 1988 as the second single from their self-titled debut album. The song was written by all three band members Clive Farrington, Andrew Mann, and Michael Floreale, and produced by Richard James Burgess. The song peaked at No. 95 on the U.S. Billboard Hot 100 chart and No. 14 on the Hot Dance Club Play chart.

== Chart performance ==
Chart (1989–1990)	Peak position
US Billboard Hot 100	95
US Billboard Hot Dance/Club Play	14
