= Here Comes Trouble (The Eyeliners album) =

Studio album by The Eyeliners
- Released: 2000
- Genre: Pop Punk
- Label: Panic Button; Lookout Records

The Eyeliners chronology
Confidential (1997)	Here Comes Trouble (2000)	Sealed with a Kiss (2001)

Professional ratings
Review scores
Source	Rating
Albuquerque Journal	4/4 stars
AllMusic	4/5 stars
Chicago Tribune	3/4 stars
Kerrang!	4/5 stars

Here Comes Trouble is an album by the Eyeliners, released in 2000.

== Critical reception ==
AllMusic wrote that "if Rizzo from Grease got cloned three times and they started their own band, it would definitely sound something like the Eyeliners." The Chicago Tribune wrote that the band have "internalized [the Ramones'] way of pounding home massive garage-pop hooks with buzz-saw punk ferocity." The Arizona Republic stated that the band "have a knack for taking classic rock and roll and reinventing it with sassy punk-rock attitude."

== Track listing ==
1. "Here Comes Trouble!" 1:12
2. "Party Til the Break of Dawn" 2:04
3. "Johnny Lockheart" 2:13
4. "See You Tonight" 1:59
5. "So What?!" 1:16
6. "Stuck on You" 2:06
7. "That's the Way It Goes" 2:26
8. "Rock & Roll Baby" 2:51
9. "Don't Go" 1:38
10. "Ooh Way Ooh (I Don't Like You)" 1:40
11. "Punk Rock Planet" 1:59
12. "Do the Zombie" 2:05
13. "If I Were You" 2:06
14. "Nothing Left to Say" 2:22
