= When in Rome (When in Rome album) =

Studio album by When in Rome
- Released: 3 May 1988
- Genre: Synth-pop
- Length: 37:41 (US); 45:24 (UK)
- Labels: 10 Records; Virgin
- Producers: Michael Brauer; Ben Rogan; Richard James Burgess

Singles from When in Rome
- 1. "The Promise" Released: 1987 / 1988; 2. "Heaven Knows" Released: 1988 (U.S.) / 1989 (UK); 3. "Everything" Released: 1989; 4. "Sight of Your Tears" Released: 1990

When in Rome is the debut album of English synth-pop group When in Rome, released in 1988 by 10 Records in the UK and Virgin Records internationally. It is the only studio album by the original lineup to date. The album includes the song "The Promise", which was the group's biggest hit.

The album peaked at No. 84 on the Billboard 200.

== Background ==
In a 1988 interview with the Evening Times, keyboardist Michael Floreale spoke of the album, "Ben Rogan was great to work with - his ideas on the backing tracks were quite complementary to our own. The songs are the best from our first couple of years, so whenever the album comes out they should still stand up as songs. We just want to be able to sell enough copies of our first album to be offered the chance to do another one."

== Critical reception ==
Professional ratings
Review scores
Source	Rating
AllMusic	1.5/5 stars

On its release, Curt Anderson of the Daily Union considered When in Rome to "sound like a lot of today's pop music: synthesizer-based, danceable and rather empty-headed". They added, "The two singers harmonize perfectly, singing lead vocals together on nearly every tune. The music is generally bright and perky, sort of what the Pet Shop Boys probably sound like when they've had too much coffee. Most of the record thumps along in this vein, although on Side 2 there is a greater reliance on real instruments that makes things more interesting." In a retrospective review, William Cooper of AllMusic concluded, "Like many one-hit wonders of the '80s, When in Rome failed to maintain the momentum set by its only hit song by releasing a dud of an album. 'The Promise' starts things off nicely, but the remainder of the album is embarrassingly weak."

== Track listing ==
All tracks are written by Clive Farrington, Michael Floreale, and Andrew Mann.

Side one
No.	Title	Length
1.	"The Promise"	3:40
2.	"Heaven Knows"	3:56
3.	"Something Going On"	3:35
4.	"I Can't Stop"	3:44
5.	"If Only"	4:08

Side two
No.	Title	Length
6.	"Sight of Your Tears"	3:34
7.	"Wide, Wide Sea"	4:05
8.	"Child's Play"	4:00
9.	"Total Devotion"	3:05
10.	"Everything"	4:00
Total length:		37:41

UK CD version
No.	Title	Length
1.	"The Promise"	3:41
2.	"Heaven Knows"	3:56
3.	"Something Going On"	3:35
4.	"I Can't Stop"	3:44
5.	"If Only"	4:05
6.	"Big City"	4:10
7.	"Sight of Your Tears"	3:34
8.	"Wide, Wide Sea"	4:05
9.	"Child's Play"	4:00
10.	"Total Devotion"	3:05
11.	"Whatever the Weather"	3:27
12.	"Everything"	4:01
Total length:		45:24

== Personnel ==
=== When in Rome ===
- Clive Farrington - vocals
- Andrew Mann - vocals
- Michael Floreale - keyboards, piano, backing vocals

=== Additional personnel ===
- Maxi Anderson - backing vocals
- Rose Stone - backing vocals
- J.J. Belle - guitars
- Michael Thompson - guitars
- Phil Spalding - bass
- Richard James Burgess - keyboards
- Mike Timoney - keyboards
- David Ervin - keyboards, drum programming
- Preston Heyman - drums
- Martin Ditcham - percussion
- Robin Jones - percussion
- Tony Charles - steel drums
- Mark Chandler - brass
- Richard Edwards - brass
- Kevin Robinson - brass
- Ian Gardiner - brass arrangements
- Nick Ingman - string arrangements
- Larry Stabbins - saxophone

=== Production ===
- Michael Brauer - producer, mixing
- Ben Rogan - producer
- Chris Fuhrman - engineer
- Teri Reed - engineer
- Martin Horenburg - assistant engineer
- Alex Rodriques - assistant engineer
- Tom Baker - mastering
- Dan Hersch - mastering

== Charts ==
Chart (1988)	Peak position
Swedish Albums Chart	42
US Billboard Top Pop Albums	84
