= The Ballad of Dood and Juanita =

Studio album by Sturgill Simpson
- Released: August 20, 2021
- Recorded: 2021
- Studio: Cowboy Arms (Nashville, Tennessee)
- Genre: Neotraditional Country, old time, gospel, bluegrass
- Length: 27:46
- Label: High Top Mountain
- Producer: Sturgill Simpson

Sturgill Simpson chronology
Cuttin' Grass, Vol. 2: The Cowboy Arms Sessions (2020)	The Ballad of Dood and Juanita (2021)	Passage du Desir (2024)

The Ballad of Dood and Juanita is the seventh studio album by American country music singer-songwriter Sturgill Simpson, released on August 20, 2021. Simpson describes the album as "traditional country, bluegrass and mountain music, including gospel and a cappella." Simpson wrote and recorded the album in a week, with a backing band known as the Hillbilly Avengers. Willie Nelson guests on the song "Juanita".

The Ballad of Dood and Juanita is a concept album set in eastern Kentucky during the American Civil War. Described by Simpson as "a simple tale of either redemption or revenge", the album's narrative revolves around the titular couple: the sharpshooting Dood and his beloved Juanita. When Juanita is kidnapped by an outlaw named Seamus McClure, Dood sets out with his mule Shamrock and his dog Sam to rescue her.

The Ballad of Dood and Juanita is Simpson's final album released under his own name, after which he debuted the alter ego Johnny Blue Skies for his eighth album Passage du Desir. He intends to release all his future albums under the new moniker.

== Critical reception ==
Professional ratings
Review scores
Source	Rating
AllMusic	3.5/5 stars
American Songwriter	3.5/5 stars
NME	4/5 stars
Rolling Stone	3/5 stars
Pitchfork	7.4/10

Editors at AnyDecentMusic? rated this release a 6.9 out of 10, aggregating 5 critic scores. According to the review aggregator Metacritic, The Ballad of Dood and Juanita received "generally favorable reviews" based on a weighted average score of 76 out of 100 from 7 critic scores.

Stephen Thomas Erlewine of AllMusic wrote that, "Its brevity means that The Ballad of Dood & Juanita can initially seem a bit slight, yet it's ultimately quite sturdy, an album that gains its strength from Simpson's dogged dedication to the concept – there's nothing extraneous in his songs here – and the impeccable execution of the band." Lee Zimmerman of American Songwriter called the album "yet another example of [Simpson's] unfettered ambition", and "his most rugged and resilient yet." NME's Leonie Cooper called the album "less a chart-friendly collection of twanging country tunes and more a deft slice of sonic storytelling", and concluded: "The Ballad of Dood & Juanita is not just a faithful, fun celebration of a traditional sound, but that of a traditional form, too."

Pitchfork's Grayson Haver Currin, in his review of the album, wrote: "By turns romantic, playful, sympathetic, and solemn, The Ballad of Dood and Juanita is a compelling update on American frontier mythmaking, delivered by a band good enough to push lovingly against genre conventions." David Browne of Rolling Stone referred to The Ballad of Dood and Juanita as "both the most natural and most baffling record [Simpson's] ever made." Browne added that, melodically, the album's songs seem "as if Simpson spent more time on the story and imagery than the melodies", writing: "As much as you have to admire Simpson for making such an oddball and ambitious record, the album rarely transcends its tale."

== Track listing ==
All tracks are written by Sturgill Simpson.

The Ballad of Dood and Juanita track listing
No.	Title	Length
1.	"Prologue"	1:01
2.	"Ol' Dood" (Part I)	2:57
3.	"One in the Saddle, One on the Ground"	3:15
4.	"Shamrock"	4:40
5.	"Played Out"	3:25
6.	"Sam"	1:12
7.	"Juanita" (featuring Willie Nelson)	3:40
8.	"Go in Peace"	2:37
9.	"Epilogue"	0:37
10.	"Ol' Dood" (Part II)	4:22
Total length:		27:46

== Personnel ==
Musicians

- Sam Bacco - percussion
- Mike Bub - bass, backing vocals
- Stuart Duncan - fiddle, backing vocals
- Mark Howard - guitar, mandolin, backing vocals
- Sierra Hull - mandolin
- Jelly Roll Johnson - harmonica
- Miles Miller - percussion, backing vocals
- Willie Nelson - lead guitar (on Juanita)
- Tim O'Brien - lead guitar, banjo, backing vocals
- Russ Phal - guitar, jaw harp
- Sturgill Simpson - rhythm guitar, vocals
- Scott Vestal - banjo, backing vocals

Technical

- Bob Clement - tacos, soup beans, brownies
- Cameron Davidson - assistant engineer
- Richard Dodd - mastering
- David Ferguson - mixing, co-production
- Bruce Green - illustration
- J Powell - lacquer cutting
- Sturgill Simpson - production
- Sean Sullivan - recording engineer

== Charts ==
Chart performance for The Ballad of Dood and Juanita
Chart (2021)	Peak position
Scottish Albums (OCC)	47
UK Independent Albums (OCC)	28
US Billboard 200	23
US Americana/Folk Albums (Billboard)	1
US Independent Albums (Billboard)	4
US Top Country Albums (Billboard)	3

== See also ==
- 2021 in American music
- 2021 in country music
- Eastern Kentucky Coalfield
- Kentucky in the American Civil War
- List of 2021 albums
