= Mutiny After Midnight =

Studio album by Johnny Blue Skies & the Dark Clouds
- Released: March 13, 2026
- Studio: Easy Eye Sound (Nashville)
- Genres: Funk rock; disco; country rock
- Length: 45:11
- Labels: High Top Mountain; Atlantic Outpost
- Producer: Johnny Blue Skies

Sturgill Simpson chronology
Passage du Desir (2024)	Mutiny After Midnight (2026)

Mutiny After Midnight is a studio album by American singer-songwriter Sturgill Simpson, released under the alter ego Johnny Blue Skies. It was released on March 13, 2026, through High Top Mountain and Atlantic Outpost as Simpson's ninth total studio album.

Simpson leaked the album on March 1, 2026, via YouTube, before its official physical-only release on March 13.

From its March 1 leak and official March 13 release, the album received largely positive reviews.

The album is a "protest against oppression and suppression, and the only tried and tested true antidote to that is pure, unfiltered, unapologetic, relentless disco-hedonism," Simpson said in a letter to fans.

== Track listing ==
All tracks are written by JS Simpson.

No.	Title	Length
1.	"Make America Fuk Again"	4:30
2.	"Excited Delirium"	2:02
3.	"Don't Let Go"	4:47
4.	"Stay On That"	4:36
5.	"Viridescent"	5:14
6.	"Situation"	5:44
7.	"Venus"	6:03
8.	"Everyone Is Welcome"	5:33
9.	"Ain't That a Bitch"	6:42
Total length:		45:11

== Personnel ==
Credits adapted from the album's liner notes.

=== Musicians ===
- Johnny Blue Skies – lead vocals, rhythm guitar, lead guitar, backing vocals
- Black Daddy – bass
- Easy Luvin – drums, percussion, backing vocals
- Raw B – keyboards, saxophone
- Little Joe – rhythm guitar, slide guitar, lead guitar, pedal steel guitar

=== Technical and visuals ===
- Johnny Blue Skies – producer
- Howie Weinberg – mastering
- M. Alan Parker – mixing, engineer
- Jonny Ullman – engineer
- Sandro Rybak – design

== Charts ==
Chart performance for Mutiny After Midnight
Chart (2026)	Peak position
Belgian Albums (Ultratop Flanders)	184
Belgian Albums (Ultratop Wallonia)	184
Croatian International Albums (HDU)	7
Scottish Albums (Official Charts)	17
UK Albums Sales (OCC)	41
UK Americana Albums (Official Charts)	11
US Billboard 200	3
US Americana/Folk Albums (Billboard)	1
US Top Rock & Alternative Albums (Billboard)	1
