= Seal It with a Kiss =

Seal It with a Kiss may refer to:

- "Seal It with a Kiss", featuring Talay Riley from Double Vision (Prince Royce album) of 2015
- "Seal It with a Kiss" (Britney Spears song), from her 2011 Femme Fatale album
- "Seal It with a Kiss", a 1980 song by New England (band)

== See also ==
- "Sealed with a Kiss", a 1960 single best known as a 1962 hit for Brian Hyland
