= Americana/Folk Albums =

Billboard album chart

Americana/Folk Albums (formerly Folk Albums) is a music chart published weekly by Billboard magazine which ranks the top selling "current releases by traditional folk artists, as well as appropriate titles by acoustic-based singer-songwriters" in the United States. The chart debuted on the issue dated December 5, 2009, as a 15-position chart with its first number-one title being the Bob Dylan Christmas album Christmas in the Heart.

It has since expanded to a 25-position chart. In May 2016, Billboard renamed the chart to "Americana/Folk Albums", with the increasing popularity of Americana music, giving more recognition to acts which lean more towards Americana than folk.

Over the chart's fourteen-year history Bob Dylan holds the record for the most number-one albums with eight. Chris Stapleton has spent 190 weeks at the chart's peak with his five number-one albums, including the longest-running number-one in the chart's history Traveller.

On the year-end Billboard charts, Sigh No More by Mumford & Sons was the best performing album of 2010 and 2011, Babel by Mumford & Sons was the best performing album of 2012 and 2013, All the Little Lights by Passenger was the best performing album of 2014, Hozier by Hozier was the best performing album of 2015, and Traveller by Chris Stapleton was the best performing album of 2016, 2017, 2018, 2019, 2020 and 2022.

== Folk/Americana chart achievements ==
=== Albums with most weeks at number one ===
Weeks	Album	Artist	Year(s)	Source
131	Traveller	Chris Stapleton	2016–2022	
79	Stick Season	Noah Kahan	2023–2026	
66	Sigh No More	Mumford & Sons	2010–2012	
61	American Heartbreak	Zach Bryan	2022–2023	
36	Starting Over	Chris Stapleton	2021–2022	
32	Babel	Mumford & Sons	2012–2013	
26	The Great Divide	Noah Kahan	2026	
21	Hozier	Hozier	2014–2015	
19	Where I've Been, Isn't Where I'm Going	Shaboozey	2024–2025	
18	The Lumineers	The Lumineers	2012–2013	

=== Artists with most cumulative weeks at number-one ===
Weeks at number one	Artist	Ref.
190	Chris Stapleton	
105	Mumford & Sons	
105	Noah Kahan	
88	Zach Bryan	
26	Hozier	
23	The Lumineers	
19	Shaboozey	
16	Passenger	
15	Bob Dylan	
15	She & Him	

=== Artists with the most number-one albums ===
Number of albums	Artist	ref
8	Bob Dylan	
6	Brandi Carlile	
5	Chris Stapleton	
5	John Mayer	
5	Sturgill Simpson	
5	Mumford & Sons	
5	Zach Bryan	
4	The Lumineers	
3	Lord Huron	
3	Bon Iver	
3	Tyler Childers	

== See also ==
- List of Billboard number-one Americana/folk albums of the 2010s
- List of Billboard number-one Americana/folk albums of the 2020s
