= Buford Abner =

American musician

James Buford Abner (November 10, 1917 – November 19, 2011) was an American songwriter, musician and singer who worked during the early days of country music, working in both secular and gospel country music genres. With his brother Merle Abner, his uncle Stacy Abner, George Hughes and Billy Carrier, he was a member of the Swanee River Boys. He was inducted into the Southern Gospel Music Association Hall of Fame in 2002 and the Atlanta Country Music Hall of Fame as a member of the Swanee River Boys.

His song "Long White Lines" has been covered numerous times, including versions by Aaron Tippin and Sturgill Simpson.

== Background ==
He was raised in Lineville, Alabama as the child of sharecroppers. At the age of 15 he became part of the Pepperel Manufacturing Company Quartet in Columbus, Georgia until he joined the Vaughn Four on WNOX radio in Knoxville, Tennessee.

== Family ==
In 1941, Abner married Dorothy Jean Dalton and they had a daughter, Pamela in 1943.
