= Sealed with a Kiss (Eyeliners album) =

Studio album by The Eyeliners
- Released: 2001
- Genre: Pop Punk
- Label: Lookout Records
- Producer: Ryan Greene

The Eyeliners chronology
Here Comes Trouble (2000)	Sealed with a Kiss (2001)	No Apologies (2005)

Sealed with a Kiss is an album by the Eyeliners, released on 25 September 2001 by Lookout Records.

== Track listing ==
1. "Sealed with a Kiss" 2:11
2. "Play It Again" 2:13
3. "It Could Have Been You" 2:00
4. "Too Good to Be True" 3:07
5. "I Could Never Hate You" 2:23
6. "Bad Luck Charm" 2:05
7. "Something to Say" 1:40
8. "When Will I See You Again?" 1:34
9. "Wishing on a Star" 2:13
10. "I'd Do It All Over Again" 2:49
11. "Everything's Alright" 2:37
12. "Finished with You" 2:12
