= Confidential (Eyeliners album) =

Studio album by The Eyeliners
- Released: 1997
- Length: 22:51
- Label: Sympathy for the Record Industry
- Producer: Sally Browder

The Eyeliners chronology
Confidential (1997)	Here Comes Trouble (2000)

Professional ratings
Review scores
Source	Rating
AllMusic	3/5 stars

Confidential is an album by the Eyeliners, released on May 27, 1997, by Sympathy for the Record Industry.

== Track listing ==
1. "You're All Wrong" – 2:42
2. "Anywhere But Here" – 1:46
3. "Won't Be Long" – 1:56
4. "Big Scoop" – 1:04
5. "Six Years" – 2:06
6. "Broke My Heart" – 1:57
7. "High School" – 1:17
8. "Secret Spy" – 2:36
9. "Too Late" – 1:35
10. "Postal" – 2:33
11. "Headache" – 2:18
12. "Instramatic" – 1:01
