= Cuttin' Grass, Vol. 2: The Cowboy Arms Sessions =

Studio album by Sturgill Simpson
- Released: December 10, 2020
- Recorded: 2020
- Studio: Cowboy Arms (Nashville, Tennessee)
- Genre: Bluegrass
- Length: 39:45
- Label: High Top Mountain; Thirty Tigers
- Producer: Ora Simpson; David Ferguson; Sturgill Simpson

Sturgill Simpson chronology
Cuttin' Grass, Vol. 1: The Butcher Shoppe Sessions (2020)	Cuttin' Grass, Vol. 2: The Cowboy Arms Sessions (2020)	The Ballad of Dood and Juanita (2021)

Cuttin' Grass, Vol. 2: The Cowboy Arms Sessions ratings
Review scores
Source	Rating
AllMusic	4.5/5 stars
Record Collector	4/5 stars
Uncut	8/10

Cuttin' Grass, Vol. 2: The Cowboy Arms Sessions is the sixth album by American country musician Sturgill Simpson, and a follow-up to Cuttin' Grass, Vol. 1: The Butcher Shoppe Sessions. It was released on December 10, 2020, through Simpson's own label, High Top Mountain. The album consists of bluegrass renditions of songs from elsewhere in his catalog.

== Content ==
As with the preceding volume, the album features various bluegrass musicians such as guitarists Tim O'Brien and Mark Howard, banjoist Scott Vestal, fiddler Stuart Duncan, and mandolinist/backing vocalist Sierra Hull. The album consists mainly of bluegrass re-recordings of previously released songs in Simpson's catalog. Two previously unheard compositions, "Tennessee" and "Hobo Cartoon," are included; the latter is co-written by Merle Haggard.

Sturgill's grandfather, Ora Simpson, who he credits for introducing him to Bluegrass music is listed as executive producer.

== Track listing ==
All tracks are written by All songs written by Sturgill Simpson, except "Hobo Cartoon" co-written by Merle Haggard.

No.	Title	Originally Featured On	Length
1.	"Call to Arms"	A Sailor's Guide to Earth	3:02
2.	"Brace for Impact (Live a Little)"	A Sailor's Guide to Earth	4:18
3.	"Oh Sarah"	A Sailor's Guide to Earth	3:05
4.	"Sea Stories"	A Sailor's Guide to Earth	3:11
5.	"Hero"	High Top Mountain	3:04
6.	"Welcome to Earth (Pollywog)"	A Sailor's Guide to Earth	4:41
7.	"Jesus Boogie"	To Wind and On To Heaven (Sunday Valley)	3:31
8.	"Keep It Between the Lines"	A Sailor's Guide to Earth	3:08
9.	"You Can Have the Crown"	High Top Mountain	3:06
10.	"Tennessee"		3:14
11.	"Some Days"	High Top Mountain	2:53
12.	"Hobo Cartoon"		2:32
Total length:			39:48

== Personnel ==
Musicians

- Mike Bub – upright bass
- Stuart Duncan – fiddle, background vocals
- Mark Howard – background vocals, lead guitar, rhythm guitar
- Sierra Hull – mandolin, background vocals
- Miles Miller – percussion, background vocals
- Tim O'Brien – background vocals, lead guitar, rhythm guitar
- Sturgill Simpson – vocals, rhythm guitar
- Scott Vestal – banjo, background vocals

Technical

- Richard Dodd – mastering
- David Ferguson – producer
- Sturgill Simpson – producer
- Ora Simpson – executive producer
- Sean Sullivan – engineer, recording

== Charts ==
=== Weekly charts ===
Weekly chart performance for Cuttin' Grass, Vol. 2: The Cowboy Arms Sessions
Chart (2020–2021)	Peak position
Scottish Albums (OCC)	32
Swedish Vinyl Albums (Sverigetopplistan)	6
US Billboard 200	30
US Top Country Albums (Billboard)	14
UK Independent Albums (OCC)	13

=== Year-end charts ===
Year-end chart performance for Cuttin' Grass, Vol. 2: The Cowboy Arms Sessions
Chart (2021)	Position
US Top Country Albums (Billboard)	95
