= Sound & Fury (Sturgill Simpson album) =

Studio album by Sturgill Simpson
- Released: September 27, 2019
- Recorded: 2019
- Studios: McGuire Motor Inn (Waterford, Michigan); Butcher Shoppe (Nashville, Tennessee)
- Genres: Blues rock; psychedelic rock; boogie rock; synth-rock
- Length: 41:08
- Label: Elektra
- Producer: Sturgill Simpson

Sturgill Simpson chronology
A Sailor's Guide to Earth (2016)	Sound & Fury (2019)	Cuttin' Grass, Vol. 1: The Butcher Shoppe Sessions (2020)

Singles from Sound & Fury
- 1. "Sing Along" Released: August 20, 2019

Sound & Fury (stylized in all caps) is the fourth studio album by American singer-songwriter Sturgill Simpson, released through Elektra Records on September 27, 2019. Its release is accompanied by an original Netflix dystopian anime film, Sturgill Simpson Presents SOUND & FURY, written and produced by Simpson and Japanese director Junpei Mizusaki of the animation studio Kamikaze Douga. The album marks a significant departure from Simpson's country roots, embracing hard rock, psychedelic, blues, and funk.

The album was nominated for Best Rock Album at the 63rd Grammy Awards. This makes Simpson the first artist to ever be nominated for both Best Rock Album and Best Country Album by the Grammy Awards.

== Background and production ==
Simpson and his band spent two weeks recording the majority of the album at the McGuire Motor Inn in Waterford, Michigan. They recorded the songs "All Said and Done" and "Last Man Standing" at the Butcher Shoppe in Nashville, Tennessee. Simpson produced the album, with co-production from John Hill and bandmates Bobby Emmett, Chuck Bartels and Miles Miller. He said that while making the album, he was listening to "a lot of hip-hop, and Black Sabbath, and the Cars, and old funk records and things."

Simpson said that while in Detroit, he was inspired after listening to Eminem to write "a bunch of mad shit-talking songs about how fucking awesome we are" but later began to think that what he and his band had produced was not "weird" enough, so came up with the idea to travel to Japan and "get the five most legendary animation directors in history together and get them all drunk and put them to competition to see who can outdo one another, and we'll just animate the whole fucking album". Simpson later characterized the album as a "sleazy, steamy, rock 'n' roll record", calling it his "most psychedelic" and "heaviest". Bobby Moore of The Boot described the album as "a collection of dystopian rock songs". Musically, SOUND & FURY has been described by critics as blues-rock, psychedelic rock, boogie rock, and synth-rock.

== Critical reception ==
Professional ratings
Aggregate scores
Source	Rating
Metacritic	79/100
Review scores
Source	Rating
AllMusic	3/5 stars
Chicago Tribune	3.5/4 stars
Exclaim!	9/10
The Guardian	5/5 stars
The Independent	4/5 stars
Paste	6.5/10
Pitchfork	7.2/10
Rolling Stone	3.5/5 stars
Sputnikmusic	4.0/5
Under the Radar	7/10 stars

Sound & Fury received positive reviews from critics. On review aggregator website Metacritic, the album has an average review score of 79/100, based on 16 reviews. Alexis Petridis of The Guardian rated the album 5 out of 5 stars and wrote that "It seems almost beside the point to note that Sturgill Simpson's fourth album sounds nothing like its predecessors, as his previous three albums didn't sound much like each other either", calling it a "hugely exciting album that underlines Simpson's status as a daring, restless and unique artist. He isn't the first musician to throw his label a curveball while protesting about the pressures of fame and the grim nature of the music business. That said, it's hard to think of anyone else who's done it by making an album as gripping and enjoyable as this." Reviewing the album in Hot Press Pat Carty reckoned "you’ve got to applaud an artist who follows his muse as resolutely as this and refuses to be corralled."

=== Accolades ===
Publication	Accolade	Rank	Ref.
Billboard	Top 50 Albums of 2019	35	
Chicago Tribune	Top 10 Albums of 2019	7	
Good Morning America	Top 50 Albums of 2019	13	
Rolling Stone	Top 50 Albums of 2019	16	
Vulture	Top 10 Albums of 2019	9	
Yahoo!	Top 10 Albums of 2019	6	

== Commercial performance ==
Sound & Fury debuted at No. 3 on Top Country Albums with 32,000 album equivalent units, 26,000 of which are in true album sales. It has sold 72,900 copies in the United States as of March 2020.

== Track listing ==
All tracks are written by Sturgill Simpson; "A Good Look" was co-written by John Prine.

No.	Title	Length
1.	"Ronin"	3:48
2.	"Remember to Breathe"	2:56
3.	"Sing Along"	2:54
4.	"A Good Look"	4:01
5.	"Make Art Not Friends"	5:51
6.	"Best Clockmaker on Mars"	3:54
7.	"All Said and Done"	3:58
8.	"Last Man Standing"	2:10
9.	"Mercury in Retrograde"	4:31
10.	"Fastest Horse in Town"	7:05
Total length:		41:08

== Personnel ==
Adapted from album notes.

- Sturgill Simpson – vocals, guitar, production, mixing (all tracks)
- Chuck Bartels – bass guitar, co-production (all tracks)
- Bobby Emmett – keyboards, synthesizer, co-production (all tracks)
- Miles Miller – drums, percussion, co-production (all tracks)
- John Hill – co-production (all tracks), additional synthesizer (1)
- James Gadson – additional drums (3, 9)
- Paul "Paco" Cossette – mixing (all tracks), engineering (1–6, 9, 10), recording (1–6, 9, 10), assistant engineering (7, 8)
- Sean Sullivan – engineering (7, 8), recording (7, 8)
- Pete Lyman – mastering (all tracks)
- Daniel Bacigalupi – mastering (all tracks)

== Charts ==
=== Weekly charts ===
Chart (2019)	Peak position
Australian Digital Albums (ARIA)	38
Canadian Albums (Billboard)	55
Scottish Albums (Official Charts)	11
Swiss Albums (Schweizer Hitparade)	76
UK Albums (Official Charts)	79
US Billboard 200	12
US Top Country Albums (Billboard)	3
US Top Rock Albums (Billboard)	3

=== Year-end charts ===
Chart (2019)	Position
US Top Country Albums (Billboard)	63
US Top Rock Albums (Billboard)	75
