= When in Rome, do as the Romans do =

Proverb attributed to Saint Ambrose

"When in Rome, do as the Romans do" (Medieval Latin: Sī fuerīs Rōmae, Rōmānō vīvitō mōre; sī fuerīs alibī, vīvitō sīcut ibī), often shortened to when in Rome..., is a proverb attributed to Saint Ambrose. The proverb means that it is best to follow the traditions or customs of a place being visited. A later version reads when in Rome, do as the Pope does.

== Background ==
In the 4th century, Saint Monica and her son, Saint Augustine, discovered that Saturday was observed as a fast day in Rome, where they planned to visit. However, it was not a fast day where they lived in Milan. They consulted Saint Ambrose who said "When I am here (in Milan) I do not fast on Saturday, when in Rome I do fast on Saturday". That reply is said to have brought about the saying "When in Rome, do as the Romans do".
