= Turtles All the Way Down (song) =

Single by Sturgill Simpson

from the album Metamodern Sounds in Country Music
- Released: April 8, 2014
- Recorded: 2014
- Genre: Country, psychedelia
- Length: 3:08
- Label: High Top Mountain; Loose
- Songwriter: Sturgill Simpson
- Producer: Dave Cobb

Sturgill Simpson singles chronology
"Living the Dream" (2014)	"Turtles All the Way Down" (2014)	"The Promise" (2014)

"Turtles All the Way Down" is a song written and recorded by American country music artist Sturgill Simpson. It was released in April 2014 as the second single from his album Metamodern Sounds in Country Music.

== Content ==
The song title, also in the lyrics, is a reference to "turtles all the way down", a lighthearted term for the concept of Anavastha from Indian philosophy, which states that there is no underlying basis, or ground, for existence. The song lyrics are about, in part, the psychedelic experience as brought on by drugs including marijuana, LSD, psilocybin, and DMT. References are made to encounters with Jesus, the Devil, Buddha, and reptile aliens. The songwriter's mortality, and the life saving effect of love, are also referenced. The musical form is that of a country music ballad.

== Critical reception ==
In his review of the album at AllMusic, Thom Jurek gave the song a positive review, praising both the production as well as Simpson's vocals and saying that "The track features Cobb's nylon-string guitar, the wafting tapes of a Mellotron, electric bass, acoustic and electric guitars, and sharp drums framing Simpson's lyrics that refer to Jesus, the Old Testament, Buddha, mythology, cosmology, drugs, and physics, before concluding that "love's the only thing that ever saved my life," making it a glorious cosmic cowboy song.

Rolling Stone ranked the song No. 4 in its article "25 Best Country Songs of 2014." It praised the lyrics, saying that ""Turtles All the Way Down" is many things. Part twisted travelogue ("Met the devil in Seattle and spent nine months inside the lion's den"), part half-baked philosophy seminar ("Our souls must roam to and through that myth we call space and time"), "Turtles" serves as Simpson's grand mission statement for the rich storytelling and sentimentality that define this promising new artist." The same outlet also ranked the song at #142 on its 200 Greatest Country Songs of All Time ranking in May 2024.

== Music video ==
The music video was directed by Graham Uhelski and premiered in April 2014.

== In Television & Film ==
The song was featured on FX's The Bridge.

The song was featured on HBO’s Watchmen in the season 1 episode “Little Fear of Lightning”.

The song was used in season 2 episode 8 of the TV series Reservation Dogs.

The song was featured in the 2022 film “Dog” starring Channing Tatum.
