= A Sailor's Guide to Earth =

Studio album by Sturgill Simpson
- Released: April 15, 2016
- Studios: Butcher Shoppe (Nashville); Atlantic (New York); CaVa (Glasgow)
- Genres: Country soul; alternative country; outlaw country; country rock
- Length: 38:54
- Label: Atlantic
- Producer: Sturgill Simpson

Sturgill Simpson chronology
Metamodern Sounds in Country Music (2014)	A Sailor's Guide to Earth (2016)	Sound & Fury (2019)

Singles from A Sailor's Guide to Earth
- 1. "Brace for Impact (Live a Little)" Released: March 3, 2016; 2. "In Bloom" Released: March 24, 2016; 3. "Keep It Between the Lines" Released: January 30, 2017

A Sailor's Guide to Earth is the third studio album by American country music singer-songwriter Sturgill Simpson. It was announced on March 3, 2016, with the release of the single "Brace for Impact (Live a Little)". The album was released on April 15, 2016, and won Best Country Album at the 59th Grammy Awards; it was also nominated for Album of the Year.

== Background ==
Prior to the album's announcement, Simpson stated in an interview with GQ that "what's next is already finished... Quite honestly, I need about six months at home with my family." On March 3, 2016, Simpson released "Brace for Impact (Live a Little)" on YouTube and his website; the next day he released the nine-song track list of A Sailor's Guide to Earth. A week later, he published the music video for "Brace for Impact", which was directed by Matt Mahurin and contains the Grim Reaper, a hot rod coffin and sailboats. On March 24, 2016, Simpson released his cover of Nirvana's "In Bloom" along with its music video, also directed by Matt Mahurin. Simpson said, "I wanted to make a very beautiful and pure homage to Kurt [Cobain]." Streaming of the album became available on April 7, 2016, on NPR's official website.

The song "Oh Sarah" was previously recorded by Simpson's former band Sunday Valley and appeared on their only full-length album, To the Wind and On To Heaven, in 2011.

== Reception ==
Professional ratings
Aggregate scores
Source	Rating
AnyDecentMusic?	8.3/10
Metacritic	86/100
Review scores
Source	Rating
AllMusic	4/5 stars
The Daily Telegraph	4/5 stars
Entertainment Weekly	A−
Exclaim!	10/10
The Guardian	4/5 stars
Mojo	4/5 stars
Pitchfork	8.0/10
Rolling Stone	4/5 stars
Spin	7/10
Uncut	9/10

A Sailor's Guide to Earth received widespread critical acclaim upon its release. At Metacritic, which assigns a normalized rating out of 100 to reviews from music critics, the album has received an average score of 86, indicating "universal acclaim", based on 19 reviews.

The album debuted at No. 3 on the Billboard 200, and No. 1 on the Top Country Albums chart, selling 52,000 copies (55,000 units when tracks and streams are included) in its first week. The album sold a further 13,400 copies in the second week. The album has sold 217,900 copies in the US as of October 2017.

Following his Grammy win, Simpson saw a 346% increase in streaming on Spotify.

=== Accolades ===
Publication	Accolade	Year	Rank	Ref.
Paste	The 50 Best Albums of 2016	2016	19	
Rolling Stone	40 Best Country Albums of 2016	2016	5	
Rough Trade	Albums of the Year	2016	91	
Stereogum	The 50 Best Albums of 2016	2016	26	

== Track listing ==
All tracks are written by Sturgill Simpson except where indicated.

No.	Title	Writer(s)	Length
1.	"Welcome to Earth (Pollywog)"		4:53
2.	"Breakers Roar"		3:33
3.	"Keep It Between the Lines"		4:01
4.	"Sea Stories"		3:17
5.	"In Bloom"	Kurt Cobain	4:01
6.	"Brace for Impact (Live a Little)"		5:49
7.	"All Around You"		3:36
8.	"Oh Sarah"		4:15
9.	"Call to Arms"		5:30
Total length:			38:54

== Personnel ==
Musicians

- Sturgill Simpson – vocals (all tracks), acoustic guitar (tracks 1, 2, 4–9), 12-string guitar (1, 5), Moog synthesizer (1, 6), horn arrangement (1, 9), background vocals (4, 6)
- Miles Miller – drums (all tracks), background vocals (3, 4, 6)
- Robert Emmett – organ (all tracks); Moog synthesizer (1, 8), Wurlitzer (1, 3), background vocals (3, 6), keyboards (5)
- Dan Dugmore – steel guitar
- Jefferson Steinberg – string arrangement, horn arrangement
- Dave Roe – bass guitar (1–8)
- Laur Joamets – electric guitar (1, 3, 4, 6, 7, 9), slide guitar (1)
- Jefferson Crow – piano (1, 3–5, 7–9), Wurlitzer (6)
- Garo Yellin – first cello (1, 2, 5, 7, 8)
- Arthur Cook – second cello (1, 2, 5, 7, 8)
- Jonathan Dinklage – violin (1, 2, 5, 7, 8)
- Whitney LaGrange – violin (1, 2, 5, 7, 8)
- Neal Sugarman – tenor saxophone (1, 3, 5, 7, 9)
- Dave Guy – trumpet, flugelhorn (1, 3, 5, 7, 9)
- Ian Hendrickson-Smith – alto saxophone, baritone saxophone (1, 3, 5, 7, 9)
- Clark Gayton – trombone (1, 3, 5, 7, 9)
- Dougie Wilkinson – bagpipes (9)
- Kevin Black – bass guitar (9)

Technical

- Sturgill Simpson – production
- David Ferguson – mixing, engineering, recording
- Gavin Lurssen – mastering
- Sean Sullivan – recording
- Geoff Allan – bagpipe engineering
- Ebonie Smith – engineering assistance

Artwork

- Greg "Gigen's Dad" Burke – art direction, design
- Kilian Eng – cover art, back cover art, ships wheel illustration
- Mark Stutzman – map illustration
- Matthew Meiners – skeletons

== Charts ==
=== Weekly charts ===
Chart (2016)	Peak position
Belgian Albums (Ultratop Flanders)	108
Canadian Albums (Billboard)	31
Dutch Albums (Album Top 100)	66
Irish Albums (IRMA)	39
Norwegian Albums (VG-lista)	34
UK Albums (Official Charts)	43
US Billboard 200	3
US Americana/Folk Albums (Billboard)	1
US Top Country Albums (Billboard)	1
US Top Rock Albums (Billboard)	1

=== Year-end charts ===
Chart (2016)	Position
US Folk Albums (Billboard)	5
US Top Country Albums (Billboard)	18
US Top Rock Albums (Billboard)	21

Chart (2017)	Position
US Folk Albums (Billboard)	24
US Top Country Albums (Billboard)	75
US Top Rock Albums (Billboard)	88
