= David R. Ferguson =

American audio engineer

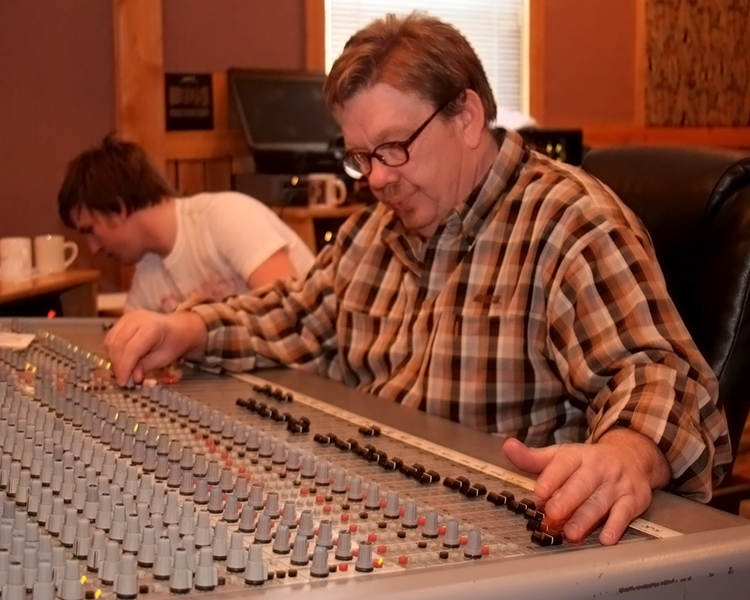
- David R. Ferguson, sound engineer
- Born: July 2, 1962 (age 64)
- Occupation: Sound engineer
- Known for: Works with Johnny Cash

David R. "Fergie" Ferguson (born July 2, 1962, in Nashville, Davidson County, Tennessee) is an American recording engineer.

== Career ==
Ferguson's career began in 1980 when "Cowboy" Jack Clement hired him as a runner at Clement's Cowboy Arms Hotel and Recording Spa, in Nashville, Tennessee, where Ferguson worked as an engineer after a couple of years. It was while working at Clement's studio in 1982 that Ferguson first met Johnny Cash. Other artists that Ferguson worked with in the 1980s included Charley Pride, Eddy Arnold, Marty Stuart, and rock-n-roll band U2. Ferguson appeared as himself in U2's 1988 film, Rattle and Hum, and portrayed his mentor and once real-life boss, Jack Clement in the 1989 biographical drama film Great Balls of Fire! about Jerry Lee Lewis.

In the 1990s and 2000s, Ferguson worked as the engineer on Johnny Cash's Grammy Award-winning American Recordings albums produced by Rick Rubin, beginning with American Recordings (1994) and continuing through American VI: Ain't No Grave (2010).

Ferguson has also engineered or produced recordings for such artists as folk music artist John Prine, bluegrass music artist Mac Wiseman, Sturgill Simpson, Tyler Childers, and the Del McCoury Band. and many others.

In 2012, he went on tour with Swedish singer-songwriter Anna Ternheim for whom he recorded her album The Night Visitor.

In April 2020, Years, a collaborative album between John Anderson, Dan Auerbach, and David Ferguson was released. In 2021, Ferguson recorded "The Housebuilding Song" for Rockstar Games' album The Music of Red Dead Redemption 2: The Housebuilding EP, a collection of tracks from the game Red Dead Redemption 2.

== The Butcher Shoppe Studio ==
In 1994, Furguson partnered with singer-songwriter John Prine to establish the Butcher Shoppe, a recording studio located next to a former meat packing plant on the Cumberland River in the Germantown neighborhood of Nashville, Tennessee. The Butcher Shoppe hosted recording sessions for such notable Americana artists as Tyler Childers, Margo Price, and Sturgill Simpson as well as Irish band Lúnasa. The studio was forced to close in 2020 when the property was sold, and Ferguson began operating a home recording studio.

== Personal life ==
Ferguson resides in nearby Goodlettsville, Tennessee, near his boyhood home.
