= High Top Mountain =

Studio album by Sturgill Simpson
- Released: June 11, 2013
- Recorded: 2012–13
- Studio: Falling Arms (Nashville, Tennessee); Hillbilly Central (Nashville, Tennessee)
- Genre: Neotraditional country; honky-tonk
- Length: 37:33
- Label: High Top Mountain; Loose
- Producer: Dave Cobb

Sturgill Simpson chronology
High Top Mountain (2013)	Metamodern Sounds in Country Music (2014)

Singles from High Top Mountain
- 1. "Life Ain't Fair and the World Is Mean" Released: October 22, 2012

High Top Mountain is the debut studio album by American country music singer-songwriter Sturgill Simpson. The album was produced by Dave Cobb and was released on June 11, 2013. Simpson self-funded the album. The record is named after a cemetery near Jackson, Kentucky where many of his family are buried.

== Reception ==
Professional ratings
Review scores
Source	Rating
AllMusic	3.5/5 stars
Record Collector	4/5 stars

Stephen Thomas Erlewine of AllMusic rated High Top Mountain 3 1/2 stars out of 5, comparing its sound favorably to Waylon Jennings. Erik Ernst of the Milwaukee Journal-Sentinel also compared it to Jennings, saying that it had "rich vintage sounds, heartbreaking ballads and juke-joint ramblers". Record Collector's Terry Staunton called the record "an absolute stormer of a first album" and "an utterly delightful collection of uncompromising hard country".

== Track listing ==
All tracks are written by Sturgill Simpson, except where noted.

No.	Title	Writer(s)	Length
1.	"Life Ain't Fair and the World Is Mean"		2:06
2.	"Railroad of Sin"		2:04
3.	"Water in a Well"		3:18
4.	"Sitting Here Without You"		2:10
5.	"The Storm"		4:02
6.	"You Can Have the Crown"		2:50
7.	"Time After All"		2:37
8.	"Hero"		4:02
9.	"Some Days"		3:30
10.	"Old King Coal"		3:07
11.	"Poor Rambler"	Ray Cline; Ralph Stanley	3:45
12.	"I'd Have to Be Crazy"	Steven Fromholz	4:02
Total length:			37:33

== Chart performance ==
The album did not receive much attention on its release and debuted at No. 47 on the Top Country Albums chart. It re-entered the chart after the release of Simpson's second album Metamodern Sounds in Country Music, eventually reaching No. 31 on Top Country Albums for the chart dated November 8, 2014. The album has sold 105,600 copies in the United States as of January 2017.

Chart (2013)	Peak position
US Top Country Albums (Billboard)	31
US Heatseekers Albums (Billboard)	11

== Personnel ==
=== Musicians and contributors ===
- Sturgill Simpson - vocals, acoustic guitar, Telecaster
- Hargus "Pig" Robbins - piano
- Chris Powell - drums
- Robby Turner - steel guitar, bass (tracks 1, 2, 3, 5, 7, 8, 10)
- Brian "Freedom Eagle Bear" Allen - bass (tracks 4, 6, 9, 11, 12)
- Bobby "Diamond Bob" Emmett - organ, Mellotron
- Leroy Powell - steel guitar (tracks 6, 9), backing vocals (track 6)
- Dave Cobb - 12 string electric guitar (track 7)

=== Technical personnel ===
- Produced by Dave Cobb
- Engineered by Vance Powell
- Assistant Engineered by Jason Mott
- Mixed by Vance Powell at Sputnik Sound - Nashville, TN
- Mastering by Richard Dodd
