= The Promise (When in Rome song) =

1987 single by When in Rome

Single by When in Rome

from the album When in Rome
- Released: 7 September 1987 (UK): August 22, 1988 (US)
- Recorded: 1987
- Genre: New wave; synth-pop; dance-rock
- Length: 3:40 (single); 9:53 (12" mix)
- Label: Virgin
- Songwriters: Clive Farrington; Michael Floreale; Andrew Mann
- Producers: Michael Brauer; Ben Rogan

When in Rome singles chronology
"The Promise" (1987)	"Heaven Knows" (1988)

Music video
- "The Promise" on YouTube

"The Promise" is the debut single by the British synth-pop band When in Rome. It was first released in 1987 on 10 Records, as the lead single from their self-titled debut album. It was written by all three band members: Clive Farrington, Andrew Mann and Michael Floreale. The song was released in the U.S. in 1988 and reached number 11 on the Billboard Hot 100 chart. It is the band's biggest commercial hit.

In 2020, Farrington and Mann, in collaboration with the City of Prague Philharmonic Orchestra and Slovenia Symphonic Film Orchestra, released a 30th anniversary orchestral edition of "The Promise" on both CD and vinyl. The release contains eleven tracks, including remixes, extended mixes, and instrumentals.

The song was covered by country singer Sturgill Simpson in 2014 for his album Metamodern Sounds in Country Music, and featured in the HBO television series The Leftovers. The song gained new life and was introduced to a new audience 16 years after its release when it was played over the closing scene of the 2004 cult hit comedy Napoleon Dynamite.

In February 2026 the song was featured in series 4, episode 7 of the BBC/HBO financial drama Industry.

== Background ==
The members of When in Rome wrote and jammed songs in a small garden shed turned studio in the house of singer Clive Farrington's father. The space was so tight that they had to attach keyboards vertically to the walls. Keyboardist Michael Floreale was experimenting with the music to "The Promise" one night in the shed, and Farrington came in and started singing a harmony. Farrington wrote the first verse and chorus, but asked bandmate Andrew Mann to write the second verse. Floreale believes the lyrics were inspired by a recent breakup Farrington had gone through. The song took two days to finish because Farrington would often have an idea for a melody just before falling asleep and would record it before polishing it the next day. Instruments used in the song include a LinnDrum machine, Roland SH-101 keyboard for the bass, and a Roland RE-501 loop echo to add warm backing vocals. "The Promise" is in the key of C major.

== Critical reception ==
William Cooper of AllMusic spoke of the song in a review of the When in Rome album, writing, "The 1988 hit "The Promise" was essentially a carbon copy of New Order's radio-friendly dance-rock. Dark yet catchy, boasting a throbbing dance rhythm, a singalong chorus, and a hypnotic melody, 'The Promise' certainly deserved the success." Cooper also highlighted "The Promise" as a standout on the album by labeling it an AMG Pick Track.

On 22 January 1989, a review of the album was published in the daily issue of the Junction City, Kansas newspaper Daily Union. The review mentioned the song, saying: "'The Promise', a hit in the United Kingdom, is typical. Starting with a piano that picks out the melody, the song throbs along electronically with clear harmonies of Mann and Farrington piercing through the catchy melody."

== Chart performance ==
"The Promise" was initially released as a 12" record and reached the top of the Hot Dance Music/Club Play chart. After the release of the group's self-titled debut album, the song was re-released and peaked at number 11 on the Billboard Hot 100. However, the single was less successful in the band's native Britain, reaching number 58.

=== Weekly charts ===
Chart (1988–1989)	Peak position
Australia (ARIA)	103
Israel (IBA)	12
UK Singles (OCC)	58
UK Airplay (Music & Media)	20
US Billboard Hot 100	11
US Billboard Dance/Club Play Songs Chart	1
US Billboard Hot Dance Music/Maxi-Singles Sales Chart	19

=== Year-end charts ===
Chart (1989)	Position
United States (Billboard)	83

== Covers ==
- New Found Glory covered the song on their 2007 album From the Screen to Your Stereo Part II
- Reel Big Fish covered the song on their 2012 album Candy Coated Fury.
- Sturgill Simpson covered the song on his 2014 album Metamodern Sounds in Country Music.
- Samia and Jelani Aryeh covered the song on Samia's 2021 EP Scout.
