= When in Rome (band) =

English synth-pop/new wave group

- When in Rome in 1987 (from left to right): Clive Farrington, Andrew Mann and Michael Floreale.

Background information
- Origin: Manchester, England
- Genres: Synth-pop; new wave
- Years active: 1987–1990
- Labels: 10 Records/Virgin; Spectra Records; August Day Recordings
- Members: When in Rome II; Michael Floreale; Tony Fennell; Chris Willett; Jack Ivins; When in Rome UK; Clive Farrington; Andrew Mann; Rob Juarez
- Past members: Andy O'Connell; John Ceravolo
- Website: www.farrington-mann.com

When in Rome were an English synth-pop/new wave group, which originally consisted of vocalists Clive Farrington and Andrew Mann, and keyboardist Michael Floreale. They are best known for their 1988 single "The Promise", which was their only top 40 hit on the Billboard Hot 100 in the US. As of July 2012, there were two bands using the When in Rome name, although the original lineup has been disbanded since 1990.

== History ==
=== Formation ===
Michael Floreale and Andy O'Connell were recruited by Clive Farrington to replace departed members of his Manchester-based group Beau Leisure. Floreale and Farrington began to write songs together. Later, Farrington and Floreale saw Andrew Mann, a beat poet, and had him join their performances. O'Connell left the group; the remaining trio recorded some demos – sometimes including Mann's friend Corinne Drewery of Swing Out Sister – while seeking a recording deal. Farrington and Floreale came up with the band name after using the famous proverb to note the cultural differences between Manchester and London. The band was signed to Elektra Records for a month before the label closed its London office, forcing the band to leave due to the time difference with the U.S. Floreale noted the influence of artists such as OMD, Howard Jones, New Order, Nik Kershaw, ABC and Spandau Ballet.

=== Debut album ===
The band was signed to Virgin UK subsidiary 10 Records, and their first release in 1987 was The Promise. The 7" release flopped and did not achieve success, while the original 12" dance mix had a minor dance club hit. An album followed in 1988, as their self-titled debut album was released on 3 May 1988. Producers Ben Rogan (who had worked with Sade) and Richard James Burgess took special interest in the trio's song "The Promise", issued first as a 12" dance disc. When the song became popular, hitting the top of Billboard's Dance Club Play chart, Virgin ordered an album. A remixed version of "The Promise" was the album's first single. It was an instant success, barely missing the top ten in the United States, peaking at No. 11. The re-released single still failed poorly in the UK with No. 86 in January 1989 and No. 58 in February. Months later, the trio reached Billboard's pop chart's lower reaches for the last time with "Heaven Knows" (No. 95 on US and 14 on US Dance, Feb 1989). Additional singles did little on the charts, like "Everything" and "Sight of Your Tears" (40, US Dance, May 1989) and the group ultimately faded away.

=== Breakup, reformation, and legal issues ===
In 1990, Floreale was fired by Farrington and Mann over creative differences and When in Rome disbanded shortly after Virgin Records dropped them in 1993. Floreale moved to the United States, and now lives in Chapel Hill, Tennessee, where he composes music for television and film. Tensions arose between the members again in 2003, when "The Promise" was used in the 2004 film Napoleon Dynamite and Floreale made sole claim to the song, despite the trio receiving equal royalties.

Floreale reformed the band in 2006 with vocalist and guitarist John Ceravolo under the name "When in Rome II". Since then, the band has toured the United States and South America with various other 1980s groups. Farrington and Mann reformed in 2009, under the name "When in Rome UK". Floreale, however, had trademarked the name "When in Rome" in 2010, which was unsuccessfully challenged by Farrington and Mann. According to a Pollstar article in May 2011, the US trademark has been acknowledged: "In order to comply with the legal claim, the UK members, are billed as "Clive Farrington and Andrew Mann formerly of When in Rome" for U.S. gigs. In addition, Floreale filed an infringement claim against Rob Juarez, an associate of Farrington and Mann who attempted to trademark his tribute band name "When in Rome Revisited".

=== Present day ===
On 10 May 2016, Farrington, with Pat Flanagan, published his autobiography Confessions of a One Hit Wonder: "The Promise" ... And the Aftermath.

As of 2019, When in Rome UK performs in the U.S. as "Farrington+Mann Original Members of When in Rome UK".

In 2019, When In Rome II reformed with former Ultravox singer and Enuff Z'Nuff guitarist, Tony Fennell.

In 2020, Farrington+Mann, in collaboration with the City of Prague Philharmonic Orchestra and Slovenia Symphonic Film Orchestra, released a 30th anniversary orchestral edition of their hit song "The Promise" on both CD and vinyl.

== Members ==
=== Original line-up (1987–1993) ===
- Clive Farrington – vocals
- Andrew Mann – vocals
- Michael Floreale – keyboards (1987–1990)
- Andy O'Connell – vocals (1987)

=== When in Rome II (2006–present) ===
- Michael Floreale – keyboards
- John Ceravolo – vocals, guitar (2006–2019)
- Tony Fennell – vocals, guitar (2019–present)
- Chris Willett – drums
- Jack Ivins - drums

=== When in Rome UK (2009–present) ===
- Clive Farrington – vocals
- Andrew Mann – vocals
- Rob Juarez – drums

== Discography ==
=== Studio albums ===
Title	Details	Peak chart positions	
Title	Details	SWE	US
When in Rome	Release date: 3 May 1988; Label: Virgin Records	42	84
When in Rome II	Release date: 11 August 2015; Label: Spectra Records	—	—
"—" denotes releases that did not chart

=== Singles ===
Year	Single	Peak chart positions			Album
Year	Single	UK	US	US Dance	Album
1988	"The Promise"	58	11	1	When in Rome
1989	"Heaven Knows"	—	95	14	When in Rome
1989	"Everything"	—	—	—	When in Rome
1990	"Sight of Your Tears"	—	—	40	When in Rome
2020	"The Promise (Orchestral Version)" (as Farrington+Mann)	—	—	—	Non-album single
"—" denotes releases that did not chart

== See also ==
- List of number-one dance hits (United States)
- List of artists who reached number one on the US Dance chart
