= Sturgill Simpson =

American country music singer-songwriter (born 1978)

Colonel (Note: Simpson was given the honorary title "Kentucky Colonel" in 2018 by Governor Matt Bevin. The title is an honorific title, the highest awarded by the Commonwealth of Kentucky, and is not a military rank. The Governor of Kentucky bestows the honor of a colonel's commission by issuance of letters patent.) Sturgill Simpson
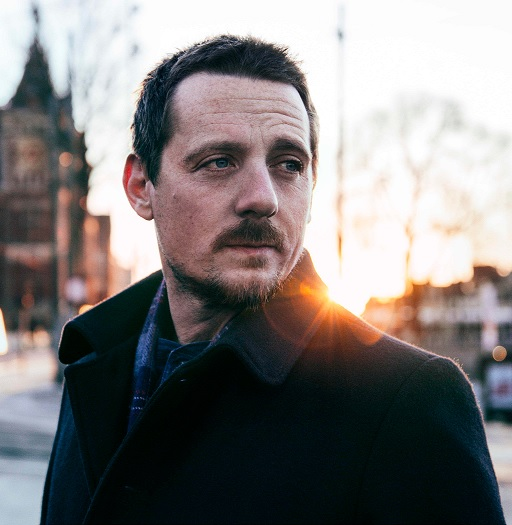
- Simpson in 2016

Background information
- Also known as: Johnny Blue Skies
- Born: John Sturgill Simpson; June 8, 1978 (age 48); Jackson, Kentucky, U.S.
- Origin: Versailles, Kentucky
- Genres: Alternative country; progressive country; outlaw country
- Occupations: Singer-songwriter; actor
- Instruments: Vocals; guitar
- Years active: 2004–present
- Labels: High Top Mountain; Atlantic; Elektra; Thirty Tigers; Loose
- Formerly of: Sunday Valley
- Website: sturgillsimpson.com
- Military career
- Allegiance: United States
- Branch: United States Navy
- Service years: 1996–1999
- Rank: Operations Specialist

John Sturgill Simpson (born June 8, 1978) is an American country music singer-songwriter and actor. Simpson's style has been met with critical favor and frequent comparisons to outlaw country.

His first two albums, High Top Mountain and Metamodern Sounds in Country Music, were independently released in the US in 2013 and 2014 and in Europe, through the British record label Loose. The latter album was nominated for a Grammy Award for Best Americana Album, listed 18th on Rolling Stone's "50 Best Albums of 2014," and named among "NPR's 50 Favorite Albums of 2014." Simpson's third album, A Sailor's Guide to Earth, was released in April 2016 on Atlantic Records and was his first major-label release, later earning him Best Country Album at the 59th Grammy Awards and also being nominated for Album of the Year.

Simpson's fourth album, Sound & Fury, was released on September 27, 2019, and was nominated for a Grammy Award for Best Rock Album at the 63rd Grammy Awards. He released two albums in 2020 – Cuttin' Grass, Vol. 1 and Vol. 2 – which feature bluegrass interpretations of songs from across his catalog, and marked his return to independent music. His seventh studio album, The Ballad of Dood and Juanita was released in August 2021. Having promised to release only five studio albums under his own name (not counting the Cuttin' Grass project) Simpson debuted the alter ego Johnny Blue Skies for his eighth album Passage du Desir. His second album as Johnny Blue Skies and his first to share billing with his band The Dark Clouds, Mutiny After Midnight, was released in 2026.

== Early life ==
John Sturgill Simpson was born in Jackson, Breathitt County, Kentucky. His father was a Kentucky State Police Trooper who formerly worked undercover. Due to his father's work, Simpson's family moved to Versailles, outside Lexington, where Simpson attended Woodford County High School. He is the first male on his mother's side of the family to not work in a strip mine or deep mine.

Simpson says of his educational career that he was "not a great student". He only "barely graduated" from Woodford High, enlisting in the United States Navy in his senior year. After three years in the Navy, where he worked in the Combat Information Center of the USS Rodney M. Davis, Simpson spent some time in Japan. He later lived in Everett and Seattle, Washington, where he waited tables at IHOP, before moving back home to Lexington, Kentucky.

== Career ==
=== 2004−2013: Early performances and recordings ===
Simpson formed the country rock band Sunday Valley in 2004, which played at the Pickathon festival in Portland, Oregon. He later moved to Nashville, but says he "didn't have the foggiest notion of how to hustle my music ... [it] was a total bust."

Setting his musical ambitions aside, Simpson focused on building a career at a Salt Lake City railroad freight-shipping yard for Union Pacific Railroad, which he eventually ended up managing. He credits his wife and friends with changing what he characterized as a hobbyist focus on songwriting and playing to convincing him to get serious about music as a potential career. After playing local open mics and gigs, Simpson returned to Sunday Valley, touring and making an album with the band and producer Duane Lundy. He and his wife moved to Nashville when the group disbanded in 2012.

After going solo, Simpson released his debut album High Top Mountain in 2013, which he self-funded, self-released, and had cut in Nashville. The album was produced by Dave Cobb. Among the session musicians were Hargus "Pig" Robbins on piano and Robby Turner, a former guitarist for Waylon Jennings, on steel guitar. The record is named after a cemetery near Jackson where many of Simpson's family members are buried. Stephen Thomas Erlewine of AllMusic rated High Top Mountain 3 1/2 stars out of 5, comparing its sound favorably to Waylon Jennings. The album's style has also been compared to that of Merle Haggard. Erik Ernst of the Milwaukee Journal-Sentinel also compared it to Jennings, saying that it had "rich vintage sounds, heartbreaking ballads, and juke-joint ramblers".

=== 2014–2016: Metamodern Sounds in Country Music ===
In 2014, Simpson released his second album, again produced by Dave Cobb, Metamodern Sounds in Country Music, to positive reviews. The lead single was "Living the Dream". The album has been described as "flesh[ing] out a deep and unconventional relationship between traditionalism and new ways of thinking," and a departure from Simpson's more traditional hard country debut. Simpson said that "recording and mixing was done in five and a half days for about $4,000. I was pretty proud about that." The album was ranked as one of the ten best of the year by The New York Times writer Nate Chinen. Metamodern Sounds in Country Music received a Grammy nomination for Best Americana Album in 2014.

Simpson made his US network television debut on July 14, 2014, on the Late Show with David Letterman, playing "Life of Sin". That year, he would go on to play "Living the Dream" on a September episode of Conan, "Turtles All the Way Down" on an October episode of The Tonight Show Starring Jimmy Fallon, and "The Promise" on a December episode of Late Night with Seth Meyers. In 2015, he returned to The Late Show and Conan, respectively playing "Long White Line" in February and "Just Let Go" in April. He played the Grand Ole Opry, and he also opened for Willie Nelson at Austin City Limits. In late 2015, he was the opening act for Merle Haggard.

His cover of "The Promise" by 1980s band When in Rome was featured in the Season 2 Episode 9 of the HBO series The Leftovers in November 2015. The first track from this album, "Turtles All the Way Down," was featured in the soundtrack for Season 1 Episode 5 of HBO's series Watchmen in November 2019. Simpson also wrote and performed "Sugar Daddy", the theme song to the Martin Scorsese/Mick Jagger-produced TV show, Vinyl. As of July 2015, Simpson's songs are represented by Downtown Music Publishing—an agreement that followed his record deal with Atlantic Records in 2015.

=== 2016–2017: A Sailor's Guide to Earth ===
In March 2016, Simpson released the first track from his third album, A Sailor's Guide to Earth, a song called "Brace For Impact (Live a Little)", with the album itself released in April. The album, which was recorded live, has been described as a "heartfelt" guide to living from Simpson to his infant son, and Simpson produced it himself, replacing Dave Cobb, the producer of his two previous records. It features work by The Dap-Kings from Brooklyn's Daptone Records, as well as a cover of Nirvana's "In Bloom." Sailor's Guide, which marked Simpson's major label debut, was nominated for Album of the Year and won Best Country Album at the 59th Grammy Awards. In January 2017, Simpson appeared on the Felicity Jones-hosted episode of Saturday Night Live, playing "Keep It Between the Lines" and "Call to Arms". On November 8, 2017, Simpson livestreamed himself busking and meeting fans outside the Bridgestone Arena in Nashville during the Country Music Association Awards ceremony, as a tongue-in-cheek response to his not being nominated for or invited to that year's awards. Eight years after its release, the album's track "Breakers Roar" was featured in the 2024 film Civil War, underscoring the record's enduring cultural resonance.

Simpson had planned to take a break from touring for the entirety of 2017 to focus on his family, but reconsidered after his Grammy nominations. He began touring again in May 2017 by playing a show at the Wharf Amphitheater in Orange Beach, Alabama, with Margo Price. He also performed as the opening act for three shows during the Guns N' Roses "Not in this Lifetime" tour in the summer of 2017. Simpson later stated that he was "talked into" returning to touring, despite his family commitments and feelings of exhaustion. While on the road in 2017, he suffered from a relapse of substance abuse and depression, though after the tour's conclusion, he reconnected with his wife "in a very profound and intense way" and also devoted more time to his children.

Simpson helped produce fellow Kentucky singer/songwriter Tyler Childers' 2017 album Purgatory after being introduced to Childers by drummer Miles Miller. Simpson would work with Childers again as producer on his next album, 2019's Country Squire.

=== 2018–2020: Sound & Fury and Cuttin' Grass ===
In a March 5, 2018, interview on The Joe Rogan Experience podcast, Simpson revealed that he was working on his fourth studio album, and hinted that it would be a double album, though this was ultimately not the case. The title, Sound & Fury, was announced on July 21, 2019, at San Diego Comic-Con, with Simpson describing it as a "sleazy, steamy rock'n'roll record". A companion anime film bearing the same name was also released on Netflix. The album was officially made available for pre-order on August 20, 2019, with the track "Sing Along" being released the same day. The album itself was released to positive reviews on September 27. It was released under the Elektra Records label, which Simpson was transferred to in 2018 following his time at Atlantic Records. Breaking with Simpson's established country style, it featured a fuzzy hard rock sound augmented by extensive use of synthesizers, influenced by psychedelia, funk, and electronic rock. The tracks "Sing Along" and "A Good Look" both featured music videos which included clips from the anime. Pitchfork praised the album as "synth-rock at its scuzziest".

In a 2020 interview, Simpson described Sound & Fury as a record born from "burnout," especially in reaction to his 2017 tours, as well as the realization that he had become disillusioned with the music industry. He cut off contact with Elektra and refused to give them any material after the release of Sound & Fury. Simpson claimed that Elektra "[did not] know what the fuck to do" with him, as he created Sound & Fury to be difficult to market, and left Elektra with a "giant un-recouped debt" upwards of a million dollars from costs relating to the album's companion film, which was similarly hard to promote. In the same interview, Simpson heavily criticized record labels, calling them overly controlling yet noncontributory, and claimed that he was manipulated into signing a record contract by people who were no longer in his life. He also claimed that his Grammy nominations for A Sailor's Guide To Earth were a scheme for the record labels to get a return on their investment, and had nothing to do with him or his music, referencing frequent criticisms of bias and "secret committees" within the Grammys.

Simpson was originally going to perform at the Woodstock 50 music festival in August 2019, before the festival's cancellation.

On October 16, 2020, Simpson released his first bluegrass album, titled Cuttin' Grass Vol. 1: The Butcher Shoppe Sessions. The album features 20 songs, including bluegrass renditions of tracks culled from his first three albums, as well as songs dating back to his mid-2000s band Sunday Valley. The album was Simpson's first collaboration with Thirty Tigers (a distribution label for independent artists), whom he began to work with after ending his contract with Elektra. The album was officially released through High Top Mountain Records, a label that Simpson owns, and it was marketed and distributed by Thirty Tigers. On December 11, 2020, Simpson released Cuttin' Grass, Vol. 2, consisting of 12 more bluegrass recordings that Simpson was "too afraid to do on volume 1." The Cuttin' Grass series marked a return to independent music for Simpson, who stated "I'm realizing more and more every day what I already knew, which is that I was always supposed to be an independent artist."

=== 2021–2024: The Ballad of Dood and Juanita ===
Simpson released the concept album The Ballad of Dood and Juanita on August 20, 2021. He described the album as "traditional country, bluegrass and mountain music, including gospel and a cappella." It was written and recorded in less than one week, alongside the same musicians Simpson worked with for the Cuttin' Grass series.

In an interview with Rolling Stone released upon the album's debut, Simpson stated that The Ballad of Dood and Juanita would be the last record he wished to release under his own name, claiming "this is the last Sturgill record." The Ballad of Dood and Juanita concluded a five-album "arc" he had envisioned and previously committed to, consisting of his five main albums and minus the Cuttin' Grass series. However, Simpson also expressed a desire to form a proper band with several musicians he respects, believing that it would be more "democratic" in terms of creativity. In September 2021, Simpson cancelled his remaining tour dates for the rest of the year after suffering a vocal cord hemorrhage.

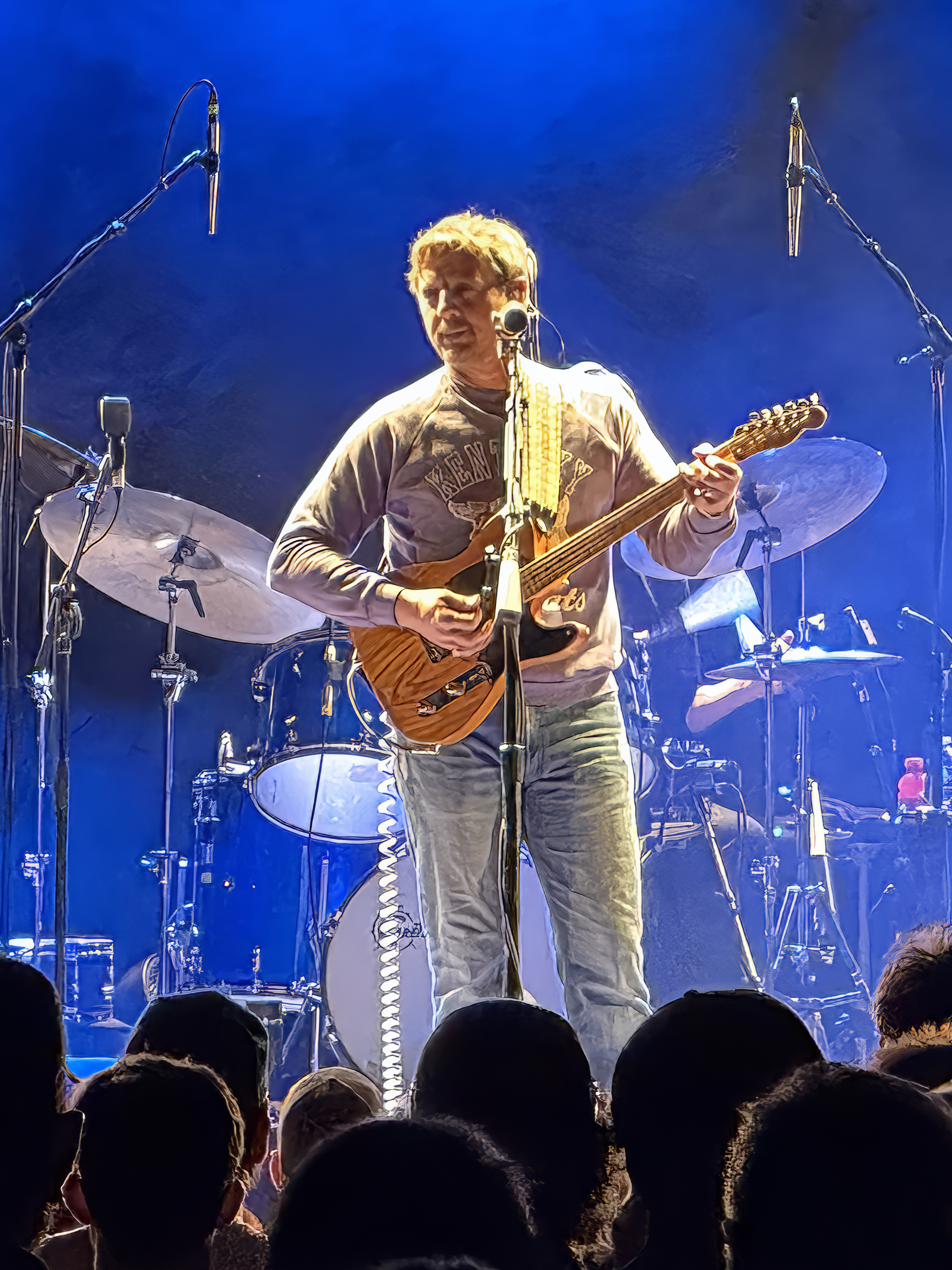
Sturgill Simpson (Johnny Blue Skies) in Birmingham, Alabama, 2025

=== 2024–present: Passage du Desir and Mutiny After Midnight ===
In 2024, Simpson announced a new album, Passage du Desir, and a tour, both to be credited to "Johnny Blue Skies". The moniker had been used in Simpson's work several times before, including as the name of a production company for the Sound & Fury film and as an easter egg in the artwork to A Sailor's Guide to Earth. In an interview with GQ, Simpson explained that his full-time adoption of the moniker came as a result of his distaste for the celebrity status he had attained. Simpson stated that he intends to release all his future albums under the new moniker of Johnny Blue Skies.

Recorded at Abbey Road Studios in London, and the Sound Emporium Studios in Nashville, Passage du Desir was inspired by Simpson's travels in Europe and Asia in the years following his vocal injury. The album was released on July 12, 2024.

On October 26, 2024, Simpson was inducted into the Kentucky Music Hall of Fame. In December 2024 Simpson played Ripple at the Kennedy Center to honor the Grateful Dead, who were the 2024 recipients of the Kennedy Center Honors.

On August 2, 2025, Simpson performed an opening set for Dead & Company at San Francisco's Golden Gate Park as part of the Grateful Dead's 60th anniversary celebration. He later joined the band during their first set to perform a cover of the song "Morning Dew."

Simpson's concluded his Who the F**k Is Johnny Blue Skies? Tour on September 17, 2025, after two nights at Red Rocks Amphitheatre. During the show, he affirmed that he and his band would henceforth be known as Johnny Blue Skies and the Dark Clouds. Simpson also expressed frustration that the promoters would not let him take his name off the billing, suggesting they were underestimating the audience's ability to recognize him without it and stating that he is ready to move on from performing under his own name. Thereafter, he announced to the audience that his next album was finished.

In February 2026, Simpson announced a new album, titled Mutiny After Midnight, set for release on March 13 exclusively on vinyl, CD, and cassette. Simpson described the album as a "dance record" inspired by the fusion-funk band Stuff and Marvin Gaye. The album was briefly published on Simpson's YouTube channel prior to its official physical release. The album was later made available for purchase on iTunes. In 2026, he launched a North American tour, the "Johnny Blue Skies & the Dark Clouds: Mutiny for the Masses Tour", in support of the album.

== Acting career ==
Simpson made his acting debut with a cameo in the 2011 indie film Orca Park. In 2018, he also had a role in the short film Black Hog Gut. He secured his first substantial role the same year, appearing in several episodes of the CBS All Access television series One Dollar, in which he plays the part of Ken Fry, a laid-off steel mill worker who sells stolen goods. In 2019, he wrote and performed the theme song for Jim Jarmusch's horror-comedy movie The Dead Don't Die, in which he also appeared as "Sturgill Zombie". A short time later, he appeared as a police officer who is killed in a struggle with one of the protagonists in the movie Queen & Slim, and in 2020, he appeared in the horror movie The Hunt. That same year, Simpson had a supporting role in the drama film Materna.

In 2021, Simpson was cast in Martin Scorsese's epic Western crime drama film Killers of the Flower Moon (2023) as bootlegger Henry Grammer, who was involved in the Osage Indian murders. Simpson's role in the film was announced on April 6, 2021; fellow country singer Jason Isbell was also announced as being part of the cast. He acted in The Creator as 'Drew'

In 2023, Simpson joined the cast for the third season of the HBO crime comedy The Righteous Gemstones playing Marshall, a member of a doomsday prepping militia. He sang a cover of "All the Gold in California" that was later released on the season's soundtrack under the name of his character Brother Marshall and the Choir of Fire.

Simpson has also expressed an interest in screenwriting; during a 2020 interview, he stated that he was working on a "punk rock" reboot of the 1981 film An American Werewolf in London, as well as a script based on his experiences in the Navy. Speaking on his acting career, Simpson said he did not consider himself an actor, "just a creative person seeking expression wherever that may come from."

== Musical style ==
Simpson's overall sound was described by Indiewire as "a mesmerizing and sometimes bewildering mix of traditional country sounds, contemporary philosophy, and psychedelic recording-studio wizardry." Simpson cites Merle Haggard, Willie Nelson, Keith Whitley, and Marty Robbins as large influences on his music. However, Simpson is also frequently compared to Waylon Jennings, and his style to the outlaw country genre of country music. Waylon Jennings' son Shooter Jennings says, "Sturgill isn't imitating at all, and he sounds like my favorite era of my dad, the Seventies, when he would sing quieter and more conversational. That's what struck me about Sturgill from Day One. And still does." Country Music Television suggested that Simpson has "a voice that recalls Merle Haggard [and] guitar licks that bring Buck Owens to mind."

== Personal life ==
Simpson's song "Oh Sarah", from his album A Sailor's Guide to Earth, is dedicated to his wife, and the record as a whole is dedicated to his first son. The couple have three sons.

Simpson is a Kentucky Colonel, having been honored at the Kentucky State Capitol on March 20, 2018. Rep. James Kay described Simpson as "independent" and "very proud to be from our great Commonwealth," calling Metamodern Sounds in Country Music "one of the best albums of all time ... pure Kentucky and ... pure Sturgill Simpson."

Simpson has been open about his struggles with substance abuse and mental health issues. In a 2020 interview, he said that he had been pursuing his own forms of self-care, including cutting sugar from his diet, racing rally cars, participating in shooting ranges, and ignoring news regarding the 2020 presidential election. In the same interview, he described his political views as not leaning "one way or the other" and classified himself as an anarchist. Simpson also took up horseback riding before filming his role in Killers of the Flower Moon.

In 2015, Simpson denied media speculation that he was an atheist, replying that he has a tattoo of Jesus' name.

In a letter to fans announcing his 2026 album Mutiny After Midnight, Simpson acknowledged that he is neurodiverse; the lyrics for the song "Make America Fuk Again" specifically reference Simpson's autism and ADHD.

== Discography ==
As Sturgill Simpson

- High Top Mountain (2013)
- Metamodern Sounds in Country Music (2014)
- A Sailor's Guide to Earth (2016)
- Sound & Fury (2019)
- Cuttin' Grass, Vol. 1: The Butcher Shoppe Sessions (2020)
- Cuttin' Grass, Vol. 2: The Cowboy Arms Sessions (2020)
- The Ballad of Dood & Juanita (2021)

As Johnny Blue Skies

- Passage du Desir (2024)
- Mutiny After Midnight (2026)

== Filmography ==
Year	Work	Role	Notes	Ref.
2011	Orca Park	Jackson	Film	
2018	Black Hog Gut	Top Hat	Short film	
2019	The Dead Don't Die	Zombie	Film	
2019	Queen & Slim	Officer Reed	Film	
2020	The Hunt	Vanilla Nice	Film	
2020	Materna	Paul	Film	
2023	Killers of the Flower Moon	Henry Grammer	Film	
2023	The Creator	Drew	Film	

Television

Year	Work	Role	Notes	Ref.
2018	One Dollar	Ken Fry	Television series (5 episodes)	
2023	The Righteous Gemstones	Marshall	Television series (3 episodes)	

== Awards and nominations ==
Year	Association	Category	Nominee/work	Result	Ref
2014	Americana Music Awards	Emerging Artist of the Year	Himself	Won	
2015	Americana Music Awards	Artist of the Year	Himself	Won	
2015	Americana Music Awards	Song of the Year	"Turtles All the Way Down"	Won	
2015	Grammy Awards	Best Americana Album	Metamodern Sounds in Country Music	Nominated	
2017	Grammy Awards	Album of the Year	A Sailor's Guide to Earth	Nominated	
2017	Grammy Awards	Best Country Album	A Sailor's Guide to Earth	Won	
2017	UK Americana Awards	International Song of the Year	"Welcome To Earth (Pollywog)"	Nominated	
2017	UK Americana Awards	International Artist of the Year	Himself	Won	
2017	UK Americana Awards	International Album of the Year	Himself	Nominated	
2017	Americana Music Awards	Album of the Year	A Sailor's Guide to Earth	Won	
2017	Americana Music Awards	Artist of the Year	Himself	Nominated	
2017	Americana Music Awards	Song of the Year	"All Around You"	Nominated	
2021	Grammy Awards	Best Rock Album	SOUND & FURY	Nominated	
2022	Grammy Awards	Best Country Album	The Ballad of Dood & Juanita	Nominated	
2022	Grammy Awards	Best Bluegrass Album	Cuttin' Grass, Vol. 1: The Butcher Shoppe Sessions	Nominated	
