= 59th Annual Grammy Awards =

2017 US music awards ceremony

- Official poster
- Date: February 12, 2017
- Location: Staples Center; Los Angeles, California
- Hosted by: James Corden

Highlights
- Most awards: Adele (5)
- Most nominations: Beyoncé (9)
- Website: http://www.grammy.com/

Television/radio coverage
- Network: CBS
- Viewership: 26.07 million

The 59th Annual Grammy Awards ceremony was held on February 12, 2017. The CBS network broadcast the show live from the Staples Center in Los Angeles. The ceremony recognized the best recordings, compositions, and artists of the eligibility year, which ran from October 1, 2015, to September 30, 2016.

The main ceremony was hosted by James Corden, with a premiere ceremony held before the event and hosted by comedian Margaret Cho.

Nominations for the 59th Annual Grammy Awards were announced on December 6, 2016. Beyoncé acquired the most nominations with nine. Drake, Rihanna, and Kanye West received eight nominations each, while Chance the Rapper followed with seven nominations. Tom Elmhirst won six awards from six nominations as an engineer/mixer. Among the artists, Adele was the biggest winner of the night, receiving five trophies, including Album of the Year for 25, Record of the Year, and Song of the Year for "Hello". Adele also became the first musician in history to win all three general field awards in the same ceremony twice, having previously won all three categories in 2012. David Bowie and Greg Kurstin followed with four trophies. Chance the Rapper won for Best New Artist alongside two other awards.

== Performers ==
Performers adapted from International Business Times.

Artist(s)	Song(s)
Adele	"Hello"
The Weeknd; Daft Punk	"Starboy" (intro) "I Feel It Coming"
Keith Urban; Carrie Underwood	"The Fighter"
Ed Sheeran	"Shape of You"
Lukas Graham; Kelsea Ballerini	"7 Years" "Peter Pan"
Beyoncé	"Love Drought" "Sandcastles"
Bruno Mars	"That's What I Like"
Katy Perry; Skip Marley	"Chained to the Rhythm"
William Bell; Gary Clark Jr.	"Born Under a Bad Sign"
Maren Morris; Alicia Keys	"Once"
Adele	Tribute to George Michael "Fastlove"
Metallica; Lady Gaga	"Moth into Flame"
Sturgill Simpson; The Dap-Kings	Tribute to Sharon Jones "All Around You"
Demi Lovato; Tori Kelly; Little Big Town; Andra Day	Tribute to the Bee Gees "Stayin' Alive" "Tragedy" "How Deep Is Your Love" "Night Fever"
A Tribe Called Quest; Anderson .Paak; Busta Rhymes; Consequence	"Award Tour" "Movin Backwards" "We the People...."
The Time; Bruno Mars	Tribute to Prince "Jungle Love" "The Bird" "Let's Go Crazy"
Pentatonix	"ABC"
Chance the Rapper; Kirk Franklin; Francis and the Lights; Tamela Mann; Nicole Steen	"How Great" "All We Got"
John Legend; Cynthia Erivo	In Memoriam "God Only Knows"

== Presenters ==
Source: Grammy.com

- Jennifer Lopez – presented Best New Artist
- Paris Jackson – introduced the Weeknd and Daft Punk
- John Travolta – introduced Keith Urban and Carrie Underwood
- Nick Jonas – presented Best Pop Duo/Group Performance
- Katharine McPhee and The Chainsmokers – presented Best Rock Song
- Ryan Seacrest – introduced Lukas Graham and Kelsea Ballerini
- Tina Knowles – introduced Beyoncé
- Camila Cabello and Thomas Rhett – presented Best Country Solo Performance
- Little Big Town – introduced Katy Perry and Skip Marley
- William Bell and Gary Clark Jr. – presented Best Urban Contemporary Album
- Gina Rodriguez – introduced Maren Morris and Alicia Keys
- Taraji P. Henson – presented Best Rap Album
- Laverne Cox – introduced Metallica and Lady Gaga
- Dwight Yoakam – introduced Sturgill Simpson
- DNCE – introduced Demi Lovato, Tori Kelly, Little Big Town and Andra Day
- Celine Dion – presented Song of the Year
- Solange – introduced A Tribe Called Quest and Anderson .Paak
- Halsey and Jason Derulo – introduced Chance the Rapper and Kirk Franklin
- Tim McGraw and Faith Hill – presented Record of the Year and Album of the Year

=== Premiere ceremony ===
In order of appearance:

- Margaret Cho - main host (presented Rock, Pop, Producer and Visual Media categories and Best Musical Theater Album)
- Lauren Daigle and For King and Country (presented Gospel/Contemporary Christian, Engineering (Non Classical), Packaging and Arranging categories and Best Historical Album, Best Album Notes, Best Surround Sound Album and Best Instrumental Composition)
- O'Connor Band - "Ruby, Are You Mad At Your Man?"
- René Marie (presented Gospel categories, Best New Age Album, Best World Music Album, Best Children's Album, Best Spoken Word Album, Best Music Video and Best Music Film)
- Ravi Coltrane and Third Coast Percussion - "Mallet Quartet"
- Sarah Jarosz (presented Classical, Engineering (Classical) and Dance categories)
- Judy Collins - "Suzanne" (Tribute to Leonard Cohen)
- Brendon Urie (presented Best Contemporary Instrumental Album, Jazz, Country categories and Best Roots Gospel Album)
- Northern Cree and Carla Morrison - "Cree Cuttin'"/"Un Beso"
- Mya (presented Latin and American Roots categories)
- Ziggy Marley - "Amen"
- Jimmy Jam (presented R&B and Rap categories and Best Reggae Album, Best Comedy Album)

== Nominees and winners ==
- Taken from the Grammys website.
- The winners are in **bold**.

=== General ===
Record of the Year

- **"Hello" – Adele**
  - **Greg Kurstin, producer; Julian Burg, Tom Elmhirst, Emile Haynie, Greg Kurstin, Liam Nolan, Alex Pasco & Joe Visciano, engineers/mixers; Tom Coyne & Randy Merrill, mastering engineers**
- "Formation" – Beyoncé
  - Beyoncé Knowles, Mike Will Made-It & Pluss, producers; Jaycen Joshua & Stuart White, engineers/mixers; Dave Kutch, mastering engineer
- "7 Years" – Lukas Graham
  - Future Animals & Pilo, producers; Delbert Bowers, Sebastian Fogh, Stefan Forrest & David LaBrel, engineers/mixers; Tom Coyne, mastering engineer
- "Work" – Rihanna featuring Drake
  - Boi-1da, producer; Noel "Gadget" Campbell, Kuk Harrell, Manny Marroquin, Noah "40" Shebib & Marcos Tovar, engineers/mixers; Chris Gehringer, mastering engineer
- "Stressed Out" – Twenty One Pilots
  - Mike Elizondo & Tyler Joseph, producers; Neal Avron & Adam Hawkins, engineers/mixers; Chris Gehringer, mastering engineer

Album of the Year

- **25 – Adele**
  - **Danger Mouse, Samuel Dixon, Paul Epworth, Greg Kurstin, Max Martin, Ariel Rechtshaid, Shellback, The Smeezingtons & Ryan Tedder, producers; Julian Burg, Austen Jux Chandler, Cameron Craig, Samuel Dixon, Tom Elmhirst, Declan Gaffney, Serban Ghenea, John Hanes, Emile Haynie, Jan Holzner, Michael Ilbert, Chris Kasych, Greg Kurstin, Charles Moniz, Liam Nolan, Alex Pasco, Mike Piersante, Ariel Rechtshaid, Rich Rich, Dave Schiffman, Joe Visciano & Matt Wiggins, engineers/mixers; Tom Coyne & Randy Merrill, mastering engineers**
- Lemonade – Beyoncé
  - James Blake, Kendrick Lamar, The Weeknd & Jack White, featured artists; Vincent Berry II, Ben Billions, James Blake, Boots, Jonny Coffer, DannyBoyStyles, Michael Dean, Alex Delicata, Diplo, Derek Dixie, Kevin Garrett, Diana Gordon, HazeBanga, Hit-Boy, Just Blaze, King Henry, Beyoncé Knowles, Ezra Koenig, Jeremy McDonald, MeLo-X, Mike Will Made-It, Pluss, Jack White & Malik Yusef, producers; Mike Dean, Jaycen Joshua, Greg Koller, Tony Maserati, Lester Mendoza, Vance Powell, Joshua V. Smith & Stuart White, engineers/mixers; Dave Kutch, mastering engineer
- Purpose – Justin Bieber
  - Big Sean, Diplo, Halsey, Travis Scott & Skrillex, featured artists; The Audibles, Axident, Justin Bieber, Big Taste, Benny Blanco, Blood, Jason "Poo Bear" Boyd, Scott "Scooter" Braun, Mike Dean, Diplo, Gladius, Josh Gudwin, Nico Hartikainen, Mark "The Mogul" Jackson, Steve James, Ian Kirkpatrick, Maejor, MdL, Skrillex, Jeremy Snyder & Soundz, producers; Simon Cohen, Diplo, Mark "Exit" Goodchild, Josh Gudwin, Jaycen Joshua, Manny Marroquin, Chris "Tek" O'Ryan, Johannes Raassina, Gregg Rominiecki, Chris Sclafani, Skrillex, Dylan William & Andrew Wuepper, engineers/mixers; Tom Coyne & Randy Merrill, mastering engineers
- Views – Drake
  - dvsn, Future, Kyla, PartyNextDoor, Rihanna & Wizkid, featured artists; Brian Alexander-Morgan, Axlfoliethc, Beat Bully, Boi-1Da, Cardo, Dwayne "Supa Dups" Chin-Quee, Daxz, DJ Dahi, Frank Dukes, Maneesh, Murda Beatz, Nineteen85, Ricci Riera, Allen Ritter, Noah "40" Shebib, Southside, Sevn Thomas, Jordan Ullman, Kanye West, Wizkid & Young Exclusive, producers; Noel Cadastre, Noel "Gadget" Campbell, Seth Firkins, David "Prep" Bijan Huges & Noah "40" Shebib, engineers/mixers; Chris Athens, mastering engineer
- A Sailor's Guide to Earth – Sturgill Simpson
  - Sturgill Simpson, producer; Geoff Allan, David Ferguson & Sean Sullivan, engineers/mixers; Gavin Lurssen, mastering engineer

Song of the Year

- **"Hello"**
  - **Adele Adkins & Greg Kurstin, songwriters (Adele)**
- "Formation"
  - Khalif Brown, Asheton Hogan, Beyoncé Knowles & Michael L. Williams II, songwriters (Beyoncé)
- "I Took a Pill in Ibiza"
  - Mike Posner, songwriter (Mike Posner)
- "Love Yourself"
  - Justin Bieber, Benjamin Levin & Ed Sheeran, songwriters (Justin Bieber)
- "7 Years"
  - Lukas Forchhammer, Stefan Forrest, Morten Pilegaard & Morten Ristorp, songwriters (Lukas Graham)

Best New Artist

- **Chance the Rapper**
- Kelsea Ballerini
- The Chainsmokers
- Maren Morris
- Anderson .Paak

=== Pop ===
Best Pop Solo Performance

- **"Hello" – Adele**
- "Hold Up" – Beyoncé
- "Love Yourself" – Justin Bieber
- "Piece by Piece" (Idol Version) – Kelly Clarkson
- "Dangerous Woman" – Ariana Grande

Best Pop Duo/Group Performance

- **"Stressed Out" – Twenty One Pilots**
- "Closer" – The Chainsmokers featuring Halsey
- "7 Years" – Lukas Graham
- "Work" – Rihanna featuring Drake
- "Cheap Thrills" – Sia featuring Sean Paul

Best Traditional Pop Vocal Album

- **Summertime: Willie Nelson Sings Gershwin – Willie Nelson**
- Cinema – Andrea Bocelli
- Fallen Angels – Bob Dylan
- Stages Live – Josh Groban
- Encore: Movie Partners Sing Broadway – Barbra Streisand

Best Pop Vocal Album

- **25 – Adele**
- Purpose – Justin Bieber
- Dangerous Woman – Ariana Grande
- Confident – Demi Lovato
- This Is Acting – Sia

=== Dance/Electronic ===
Best Dance Recording

- **"Don't Let Me Down" – The Chainsmokers featuring Daya**
  - **The Chainsmokers, producers; Jordan Young, mixer**
- "Tearing Me Up" – Bob Moses
  - Bob Moses, producers; Mark "Spike" Stent, mixer
- "Never Be Like You" – Flume featuring Kai
  - Harley Streten, producer; Eric J Dubowsky, mixer
- "'Rinse & Repeat" – Riton featuring Kah-Lo
  - Riton, producer; Wez Clarke, mixer
- "Drinkee" – Sofi Tukker
  - Sofi Tukker, producers; Bryan Wilson, mixer

Best Dance/Electronic Album

- **Skin – Flume**
- Electronica 1: The Time Machine – Jean-Michel Jarre
- Epoch – Tycho
- Barbara Barbara, We Face a Shining Future – Underworld
- Louie Vega Starring...XXVIII – Little Louie Vega

=== Contemporary Instrumental ===
Best Contemporary Instrumental Album

- **Culcha Vulcha – Snarky Puppy**
- Human Nature – Herb Alpert
- When You Wish Upon a Star – Bill Frisell
- Way Back Home: Live from Rochester, NY – Steve Gadd Band
- Unspoken – Chuck Loeb

=== Rock ===
Best Rock Performance

- **"Blackstar" – David Bowie**
- "Joe" (Live from Austin City Limits) – Alabama Shakes
- "Don't Hurt Yourself" – Beyoncé featuring Jack White
- "The Sound of Silence" (Live on Conan) – Disturbed
- "Heathens" – Twenty One Pilots

Best Metal Performance

- **"Dystopia" – Megadeth**
- "Shock Me" – Baroness
- "Silvera" – Gojira
- "Rotting in Vain" – Korn
- "The Price Is Wrong" – Periphery

Best Rock Song

- **"Blackstar"**
  - **David Bowie, songwriter (David Bowie)**
- "Burn the Witch"
  - Radiohead, songwriters (Radiohead)
- "Hardwired"
  - James Hetfield & Lars Ulrich, songwriters (Metallica)
- "Heathens"
  - Tyler Joseph, songwriter (Twenty One Pilots)
- "My Name Is Human"
  - Rich Meyer, Ryan Meyer & Johnny Stevens, songwriters (Highly Suspect)

Best Rock Album

- **Tell Me I'm Pretty – Cage the Elephant**
- California – Blink-182
- Magma – Gojira
- Death of a Bachelor – Panic! at the Disco
- Weezer – Weezer

=== Alternative ===
Best Alternative Music Album

- **Blackstar – David Bowie**
- 22, A Million – Bon Iver
- The Hope Six Demolition Project – PJ Harvey
- Post Pop Depression – Iggy Pop
- A Moon Shaped Pool – Radiohead

=== R&B ===
Best R&B Performance

- **"Cranes in the Sky" – Solange**
- "Turnin' Me Up" – BJ the Chicago Kid
- "Permission" – Ro James
- "I Do" – Musiq Soulchild
- "Needed Me" – Rihanna

Best Traditional R&B Performance

- **"Angel" – Lalah Hathaway**
- "The Three of Me" – William Bell
- "Woman's World" – BJ the Chicago Kid
- "Sleeping with the One I Love" – Fantasia
- "Can't Wait" – Jill Scott

Best R&B Song

- **"Lake by the Ocean"**
  - **Hod David & Musze, songwriters (Maxwell)**
- "Come and See Me"
  - J. Brathwaite, Aubrey Graham & Noah Shebib, songwriters (PartyNextDoor featuring Drake)
- "Exchange"
  - Michael Hernandez & Bryson Tiller, songwriters (Bryson Tiller)
- "Kiss It Better"
  - Jeff Bhasker, Robyn Fenty, John-Nathan Glass & Teddy Sinclair, songwriters (Rihanna)
- "Luv"
  - Magnus August Høiberg, Benjamin Levin & Daystar Peterson, songwriters (Tory Lanez)

Best Urban Contemporary Album

- **Lemonade – Beyoncé**
- Ology – Gallant
- We Are King – KING
- Malibu – Anderson .Paak
- Anti – Rihanna

Best R&B Album

- **Lalah Hathaway Live – Lalah Hathaway**
- In My Mind – BJ the Chicago Kid
- Velvet Portraits – Terrace Martin
- Healing Season – Mint Condition
- Smoove Jones – Mýa

=== Rap ===
Best Rap Performance

- **"No Problem" – Chance the Rapper featuring Lil Wayne & 2 Chainz**
- "Panda" – Desiigner
- "Pop Style" – Drake featuring The Throne
- "All the Way Up" – Fat Joe & Remy Ma featuring French Montana & Infared
- "THat Part" – ScHoolboy Q featuring Kanye West

Best Rap/Sung Performance

- **"Hotline Bling" – Drake**
- "Freedom" – Beyoncé featuring Kendrick Lamar
- "Broccoli" – DRAM featuring Lil Yachty
- "Ultralight Beam" – Kanye West featuring Chance the Rapper, Kelly Price, Kirk Franklin & The-Dream
- "Famous" – Kanye West featuring Rihanna and Swizz Beatz

Best Rap Song

- **"Hotline Bling"**
  - **Aubrey Graham & Paul Jefferies, songwriters (Drake)**
- "All the Way Up"
  - Joseph Cartagena, Edward Davadi, Shandel Green, Karim Kharbouch, Andre Christopher Lyon, Reminisce Mackie & Marcello Valenzano, songwriters (Fat Joe & Remy Ma featuring French Montana & Infared)
- "Famous"
  - Chancellor Bennett, Ross Birchard, Ernest Brown, Andrew Dawson, Kasseem Dean, Mike Dean, Noah Goldstein, Kejuan Muchita, Patrick Reynolds, Kanye West, Cydel Young & Malik Yusef, songwriters (Kanye West featuring Rihanna)
- "No Problem"
  - Chancellor Bennett, Dwayne Carter, Rachel Cato, Peter Cottontale, Tauheed Epps, Jonathan Hoard, Cam O'bi, Ivan Rosenberg, Conor Szymanski, Lakeithsha Williams & Jaime Woods, songwriters (Chance the Rapper featuring Lil Wayne and 2 Chainz)
- "Ultralight Beam"
  - Chancellor Bennett, Kasseem Dean, Mike Dean, Kirk Franklin, Noah Goldstein, Samuel Griesemer, Terius Nash, Jerome Potter, Kelly Price, Nico "Donnie Trumpet" Segal, Derek Watkins, Kanye West, Cydel Young & Malik Yusef, songwriters (Kanye West featuring Chance The Rapper, Kelly Price, Kirk Franklin & The-Dream)

Best Rap Album

- **Coloring Book – Chance the Rapper**
- and the Anonymous Nobody... – De La Soul
- Major Key – DJ Khaled
- Views – Drake
- Blank Face LP – ScHoolboy Q
- The Life of Pablo – Kanye West

=== Country ===
Best Country Solo Performance

- **"My Church" – Maren Morris**
- "Love Can Go to Hell" – Brandy Clark
- "Vice" – Miranda Lambert
- "Church Bells" – Carrie Underwood
- "Blue Ain't Your Color" – Keith Urban

Best Country Duo/Group Performance

- **"Jolene" – Pentatonix featuring Dolly Parton**
- "Different for Girls" – Dierks Bentley featuring Elle King
- "21 Summer" – Brothers Osborne
- "Setting the World on Fire" – Kenny Chesney & Pink
- "Think of You" – Chris Young with Cassadee Pope

Best Country Song

- **"Humble and Kind"**
  - **Lori McKenna, songwriter (Tim McGraw)**
- "Blue Ain't Your Color"
  - Clint Lagerberg, Hillary Lindsey & Steven Lee Olsen, songwriters (Keith Urban)
- "Die a Happy Man"
  - Sean Douglas, Thomas Rhett & Joe Spargur, songwriters (Thomas Rhett)
- "My Church"
  - busbee & Maren Morris, songwriters (Maren Morris)
- "Vice"
  - Miranda Lambert, Shane McAnally & Josh Osborne, songwriters (Miranda Lambert)

Best Country Album

- **A Sailor's Guide to Earth – Sturgill Simpson**
- Big Day in a Small Town – Brandy Clark
- Full Circle – Loretta Lynn
- Hero – Maren Morris
- Ripcord – Keith Urban

=== New Age ===
Best New Age Album

- **White Sun II – White Sun**
- Orogen – John Burke
- Dark Sky Island – Enya
- Inner Passion – Peter Kater & Tina Guo
- Rosetta – Vangelis

=== Jazz ===
Best Improvised Jazz Solo

- **"I'm So Lonesome I Could Cry" – John Scofield, soloist**
- "Countdown" – Joey Alexander, soloist
- "In Movement" – Ravi Coltrane, soloist
- "We See" – Fred Hersch, soloist
- "I Concentrate on You" – Brad Mehldau, soloist

Best Jazz Vocal Album

- **Take Me to the Alley – Gregory Porter**
- Sound of Red – René Marie
- Upward Spiral – Branford Marsalis Quartet with special guest Kurt Elling
- Harlem on My Mind – Catherine Russell
- The Sting Variations – The Tierney Sutton Band

Best Jazz Instrumental Album

- **Country for Old Men – John Scofield**
- Book of Intuition – Kenny Barron Trio
- Dr. Um – Peter Erskine
- Sunday Night at the Vanguard – The Fred Hersch Trio
- Nearness – Joshua Redman & Brad Mehldau

Best Large Jazz Ensemble Album

- **Presidential Suite: Eight Variations on Freedom – Ted Nash Big Band**
- Real Enemies – Darcy James Argue's Secret Society
- MONK'estra, Vol. 1 – John Beasley
- Kaleidoscope Eyes: Music of the Beatles – John Daversa
- All L.A. Band – Bob Mintzer

Best Latin Jazz Album

- **Tribute to Irakere: Live in Marciac – Chucho Valdés**
- Entre Colegas – Andy González
- Madera Latino: A Latin Jazz Perspective on the Music of Woody Shaw – Brian Lynch & various artists
- Canto América – Michael Spiro/Wayne Wallace La Orquesta Sinfonietta
- 30 – Trio Da Paz

=== Gospel/Contemporary Christian Music ===
Best Gospel Performance/Song

- **"God Provides" – Tamela Mann**
  - **Kirk Franklin, songwriter**
- "It's Alright, It's OK" – Shirley Caesar featuring Anthony Hamilton
  - Stanley Brown & Courtney Rumble, songwriters
- "You're Bigger [Live]" – Jekalyn Carr
  - Allundria Carr, songwriter
- "Made a Way [Live]" – Travis Greene
  - Travis Greene, songwriter
- "Better" – Hezekiah Walker
  - Jason Clayborn, Gabriel Hatcher & Hezekiah Walker, songwriters

Best Contemporary Christian Music Performance/Song

- **"Thy Will" – Hillary Scott & The Scott Family**
  - **Bernie Herms, Hillary Scott & Emily Weisband, songwriters**
- "Trust in You" – Lauren Daigle
  - Lauren Daigle, Michael Farren & Paul Mabury, songwriters
- "Priceless" – For King & Country
  - Benjamin Backus, Seth Mosley, Joel Smallbone, Luke Smallbone & Tedd Tjornhom, songwriters
- "King of the World" – Natalie Grant
  - Natalie Grant, Becca Mizell & Samuel Mizell, songwriters
- "Chain Breaker" – Zach Williams
  - Mia Fieldes, Jonathan Smith & Zach Williams, songwriters

Best Gospel Album

- **Losing My Religion – Kirk Franklin**
- Listen – Tim Bowman Jr.
- Fill This House – Shirley Caesar
- A Worshipper's Heart [Live] – Todd Dulaney
- Demonstrate [Live] – William Murphy

Best Contemporary Christian Music Album

- **Love Remains – Hillary Scott & The Scott Family**
- Poets & Saints – All Sons & Daughters
- American Prodigal – Crowder
- Be One – Natalie Grant
- Youth Revival [Live] – Hillsong Young & Free

Best Roots Gospel Album

- **Hymns That Are Important to Us – Joey + Rory**
- Better Together – Gaither Vocal Band
- Nature's Symphony in 432 – The Isaacs
- Hymns and Songs of Inspiration – Gordon Mote
- God Don't Never Change: The Songs of Blind Willie Johnson – (Various Artists); Jeffrey Gaskill, producer

=== Latin ===
Best Latin Pop Album

- **Un Besito Más – Jesse & Joy**
- Ilusión – Gaby Moreno
- Similares – Laura Pausini
- Seguir Latiendo – Sanalejo
- Buena Vida – Diego Torres

Best Latin Rock, Urban or Alternative Album

- **iLevitable – ile**
- L.H.O.N. (La Humanidad o Nosotros) – Illya Kuryaki and the Valderramas
- Buenaventura – La Santa Cecilia
- Los Rakas – Los Rakas
- Amor Supremo – Carla Morrison

Best Regional Mexican Music Album (Including Tejano)

- **Un Azteca en el Azteca, Vol. 1 (En Vivo) – Vicente Fernández**
- Raíces – Banda El Recodo de Cruz Lizárraga
- Hecho a Mano – Joss Favela
- Generación Maquinaria Est. 2006 – La Maquinaria Norteña
- Tributo a Joan Sebastian y Rigoberto Alfaro – Mariachi Divas de Cindy Shea

Best Tropical Latin Album

- **Donde Están? – Jose Lugo & Guasábara Combo**
- Conexión – Fonseca
- La Fantasia Homenaje a Juan Formell – Formell y Los Van Van
- 35 Aniversario – Grupo Niche
- La Sonora Santanera en Su 60 Aniversario – Sonora Santanera

=== American Roots ===
Best American Roots Performance

- **"House of Mercy" – Sarah Jarosz**
- "Ain't No Man" – The Avett Brothers
- "Mother's Children Have a Hard Time" – The Blind Boys of Alabama
- "Factory Girl" – Rhiannon Giddens
- "Wreck You" – Lori McKenna

Best American Roots Song

- **"Kid Sister"**
  - **Vince Gill, songwriter (The Time Jumpers)**
- "Alabama at Night"
  - Robbie Fulks, songwriter (Robbie Fulks)
- "City Lights"
  - Jack White, songwriter (Jack White/The White Stripes)
- "Gulfstream"
  - Eric Adcock & Roddie Romero, songwriters (Roddie Romero and the Hub City All-Stars)
- "Wreck You"
  - Lori McKenna & Felix McTeigue, songwriters (Lori McKenna)

Best Americana Album

- **This Is Where I Live – William Bell**
- True Sadness – The Avett Brothers
- The Cedar Creek Sessions – Kris Kristofferson
- The Bird and the Rifle – Lori McKenna
- Kid Sister – The Time Jumpers

Best Bluegrass Album

- **Coming Home – O'Connor Band with Mark O'Connor**
- Original Traditional – Blue Highway
- Burden Bearer – Doyle Lawson & Quicksilver
- The Hazel and Alice Sessions – Laurie Lewis & The Right Hands
- North by South – Claire Lynch

Best Traditional Blues Album

- **Porcupine Meat – Bobby Rush**
- Can't Shake the Feeling – Lurrie Bell
- Live at the Greek Theatre – Joe Bonamassa
- Blues & Ballads (A Folksinger's Songbook: Volumes I & II) – Luther Dickinson
- The Soul of Jimmie Rodgers – Vasti Jackson

Best Contemporary Blues Album

- **The Last Days of Oakland – Fantastic Negrito**
- Love Wins Again – Janiva Magness
- Bloodline – Kenny Neal
- Give It Back to You – The Record Company
- Everybody Wants a Piece – Joe Louis Walker

Best Folk Album

- **Undercurrent – Sarah Jarosz**
- Silver Skies Blue – Judy Collins & Ari Hest
- Upland Stories – Robbie Fulks
- Factory Girl – Rhiannon Giddens
- Weighted Mind – Sierra Hull

Best Regional Music Album

- **E Walea – Kalani Pe'a**
- Broken Promised Land – Barry Jean Ancelet & Sam Broussard
- It's a Cree Thing – Northern Cree
- Gulfstream – Roddie Romero and the Hub City All-Stars
- I Wanna Sing Right: Rediscovering Lomax in the Evangeline Country – (Various Artists); Joshua Caffery & Joel Savoy, producers

=== Reggae ===
Best Reggae Album

- **Ziggy Marley – Ziggy Marley**
- Sly & Robbie Presents... Reggae For Her – Devin Di Dakta & J.L
- Rose Petals – J Boog
- Everlasting – Raging Fyah
- Falling Into Place – Rebelution
- SOJA: Live in Virginia – SOJA

=== World Music ===
Best World Music Album

- **Sing Me Home – Yo-Yo Ma & The Silk Road Ensemble**
- Destiny – Celtic Woman
- Walking in the Footsteps of Our Fathers – Ladysmith Black Mambazo
- Land of Gold – Anoushka Shankar
- Dois Amigos, Um Século de Música: Multishow Live – Caetano Veloso & Gilberto Gil

=== Children's ===
Best Children's Album

- **Infinity Plus One – Secret Agent 23 Skidoo**
- Explorer of the World – Frances England
- Novelties – Recess Monkey
- Press Play – Brady Rymer And The Little Band That Could
- Saddle Up – The Okee Dokee Brothers

=== Spoken Word ===
Best Spoken Word Album (includes Poetry, Audio Books and Storytelling)

- **In Such Good Company: Eleven Years of Laughter, Mayhem, and Fun in the Sandbox – Carol Burnett**
- The Girl with the Lower Back Tattoo – Amy Schumer
- M Train – Patti Smith
- Under The Big Black Sun: A Personal History of L.A. Punk – Various Artists
- Unfaithful Music & Disappearing Ink – Elvis Costello

=== Comedy ===
Best Comedy Album

- **Talking for Clapping – Patton Oswalt**
- ...America...Great... – David Cross
- American Myth – Margaret Cho
- Boyish Girl Interrupted – Tig Notaro
- Live at the Apollo – Amy Schumer

=== Musical Theatre ===
Best Musical Theater Album

- **The Color Purple – Danielle Brooks, Cynthia Erivo & Jennifer Hudson, principal soloists; Stephen Bray, Van Dean, Frank Filipetti, Roy Furman, Joan Raffe, Scott Sanders & Jhett Tolentino, producers; (Stephen Bray, Brenda Russell & Allee Willis, composers/lyricists) (New Broadway Cast)**
- Bright Star – Carmen Cusack, principal soloist; Jay Alix, Peter Asher & Una Jackman, producers; Steve Martin, composer; Edie Brickell, composer & lyricist (Original Broadway Cast)
- Fiddler on the Roof – Danny Burstein, principal soloist; Louise Gund, David Lai & Ted Sperling, producers; (Jerry Bock, composer; Sheldon Harnick, lyricist) (2016 Broadway Cast)
- Kinky Boots – Killian Donnelly & Matt Henry, principal soloists; Sammy James Jr., Cyndi Lauper, Stephen Oremus & William Wittman, producers; (Cyndi Lauper, composer & lyricist) (Original West End Cast)
- Waitress – Jessie Mueller, principal soloist; Neal Avron, Sara Bareilles & Nadia DiGiallonardo, producers; Sara Bareilles, composer & lyricist (Original Broadway Cast)

=== Music for Visual Media ===
Best Compilation Soundtrack for Visual Media

- **Miles Ahead – (Miles Davis & Various Artists)**
  - **Steve Berkowitz, Don Cheadle & Robert Glasper, compilation producers**
- Amy – (Various Artists)
  - Salaam Remi & Mark Ronson, compilation producers
- Straight Outta Compton – (Various Artists)
  - O'Shea Jackson & Andre Young, compilation producers
- Suicide Squad (Collector's Edition) – (Various Artists)
  - Mike Caren, Darren Higman & Kevin Weaver, compilation producers
- Vinyl: The Essentials Season 1 – (Various Artists)
  - Stewart Lerman, Randall Poster & Kevin Weaver, compilation producers

Best Score Soundtrack for Visual Media

- **Star Wars: The Force Awakens – John Williams, composer**
- Bridge of Spies – Thomas Newman, composer
- The Hateful Eight – Ennio Morricone, composer
- The Revenant – Alva Noto & Ryuichi Sakamoto, composers
- Stranger Things, Vol. 1 – Kyle Dixon & Michael Stein, composers
- Stranger Things, Vol. 2 – Kyle Dixon & Michael Stein, composers

Best Song Written for Visual Media

- **"Can't Stop the Feeling!" – Max Martin, Shellback & Justin Timberlake, songwriters (performed by Justin Timberlake, Anna Kendrick, Gwen Stefani, James Corden, Zooey Deschanel, Walt Dohrn, Ron Funches, Caroline Hjelt, Aino Jawo, Christopher Mintz-Plasse & Kunal Nayyar)**
- "Heathens" – Tyler Joseph, songwriter (performed by Twenty One Pilots)
- "Just Like Fire" – Oscar Holter, Max Martin, Pink & Shellback, songwriters (performed by Pink)
- "Purple Lamborghini" – Shamann Cooke, Sonny Moore & William Roberts, songwriters (performed by Skrillex & Rick Ross)
- "Try Everything" – Mikkel S. Eriksen, Sia & Tor Erik Hermansen, songwriters (performed by Shakira)
- "The Veil" – Peter Gabriel, songwriter (performed by Peter Gabriel)

=== Composing ===
Best Instrumental Composition

- **"Spoken at Midnight"**
  - **Ted Nash, composer (Ted Nash Big Band)**
- "Bridge of Spies (End Title)"
  - Thomas Newman, composer (Thomas Newman)
- "The Expensive Train Set (An Epic Sarahnade for Big Band)"
  - Tim Davies, composer (Tim Davies Big Band)
- "Flow"
  - Alan Ferber, composer (Alan Ferber Nonet)
- "L'Ultima Diligenza Di Red Rock – Verisione Integrale"
  - Ennio Morricone, composer (Ennio Morricone)

=== Arranging ===
Best Arrangement, Instrumental or A Cappella

- **"You and I"**
  - **Jacob Collier, arranger (Jacob Collier)**
- "Ask Me Now"
  - John Beasley, arranger (John Beasley)
- "Good 'Swing' Wenceslas"
  - Sammy Nestico, arranger (The Count Basie Orchestra)
- "Linus & Lucy"
  - Christian Jacob, arranger (The Phil Norman Tentet)
- "Lucy in the Sky with Diamonds"
  - John Daversa, arranger (John Daversa)
- "We Three Kings"
  - Ted Nash, arranger (Jazz at Lincoln Center Orchestra With Wynton Marsalis)

Best Arrangement, Instruments and Vocals

- **"Flintstones"**
  - **Jacob Collier, arranger (Jacob Collier)**
- "Do You Hear What I Hear?"
  - Gordon Goodwin, arranger2 (Gordon Goodwin's Big Phat Band Featuring Take 6)
- "Do You Want to Know a Secret"
  - John Daversa, arranger (John Daversa Featuring Renee Olstead)
- "I'm a Fool to Want You"
  - Alan Broadbent, arranger (Kristin Chenoweth)
- "Somewhere (Dirty Blvd) (Extended Version)"
  - Billy Childs & Larry Klein, arrangers (Lang Lang Featuring Lisa Fischer & Jeffrey Wright)

=== Packaging ===
Best Recording Package

- **Blackstar**
  - **Jonathan Barnbrook, art director (David Bowie)**
- Anti (Deluxe Edition)
  - Ciarra Pardo & Robyn Fenty, art directors (Rihanna)
- Human Performance
  - Andrew Savage, art director (Parquet Courts)
- Sunset Motel
  - Sarah Dodds & Shauna Dodds, art directors (Reckless Kelly)
- 22, A Million
  - Eric Timothy Carlson, art director (Bon Iver)

Best Boxed or Special Limited Edition Package

- **Édith Piaf 1915–2015**
  - **Gérard Lo Monaco, art director (Édith Piaf)**
- 401 Days
  - Jonathan Dagan & Mathias Høst Normark, art directors (J.Views)
- I Like It When You Sleep, For You Are So Beautiful Yet So Unaware Of It
  - Samuel Burgess-Johnson & Matthew Healy, art directors (The 1975)
- Paper Wheels (Deluxe Limited Edition)
  - Matt Taylor, art director (Trey Anastasio)
- Tug of War (Deluxe Edition)
  - Simon Earith & James Musgrave, art directors (Paul McCartney)

=== Notes ===
Best Album Notes

- **Sissle and Blake Sing Shuffle Along**
  - **Ken Bloom & Richard Carlin, album notes writers (Eubie Blake & Noble Sissle)**
- The Complete Monument & Columbia Albums Collection
  - Mikal Gilmore, album notes writer (Kris Kristofferson)
- The Knoxville Sessions, 1929–1930: Knox County Stomp
  - Ted Olson & Tony Russell, album notes writers (Various Artists)
- Ork Records: New York, New York
  - Rob Sevier & Ken Shipley, album notes writers (Various Artists)
- Waxing The Gospel: Mass Evangelism & The Phonograph, 1890–1990
  - Richard Martin, album notes writer (Various Artists)

=== Historical ===
Best Historical Album

- **The Cutting Edge 1965–1966: The Bootleg Series, Vol. 12 (Collector's Edition)**
  - **Steve Berkowitz & Jeff Rosen, compilation producers; Mark Wilder, mastering engineer (Bob Dylan)**
- Music of Morocco from the Library of Congress: Recorded By Paul Bowles, 1959
  - April G. Ledbetter, Steven Lance Ledbetter, Bill Nowlin & Philip D. Schuyler, compilation producers; Rick Fisher & Michael Graves, mastering engineers (Various Artists)
- Ork Records: New York, New York
  - Rob Sevier & Ken Shipley, compilation producers; Jeff Lipton & Maria Rice, mastering engineers (Various Artists)
- Vladimir Horowitz: The Unreleased Live Recordings 1966–1983
  - Bernard Horowitz, Andreas K. Meyer & Robert Russ, compilation producers; Andreas K. Meyer & Jeanne Montalvo, mastering engineers (Vladimir Horowitz)
- Waxing The Gospel: Mass Evangelism & the Phonograph, 1890–1990
  - Michael Devecka, Meagan Hennessey & Richard Martin, compilation producers; Michael Devecka, David Giovannoni, Michael Khanchalian & Richard Martin, mastering engineers (Various Artists)

=== Engineered Album ===
Best Engineered Album, Non-Classical

- **Blackstar**
  - **David Bowie, Tom Elmhirst, Kevin Killen & Tony Visconti, engineers; Joe LaPorta, mastering engineer (David Bowie)**
- Are You Serious
  - Tchad Blake & David Boucher, engineers; Bob Ludwig, mastering engineer (Andrew Bird)
- Dig In Deep
  - Ryan Freeland, engineer; Kim Rosen, mastering engineer (Bonnie Raitt)
- Hit N Run Phase Two
  - Booker T., Dylan Dresdow, Chris James, Prince & Justin Stanley, engineers; Dylan Dresdow, mastering engineer (Prince)
- Undercurrent
  - Shani Gandhi & Gary Paczosa, engineers; Paul Blakemore, mastering engineer (Sarah Jarosz)

Best Engineered Album, Classical

- **The Ghosts of Versailles**
  - **Mark Donahue, Fred Vogler & David L Williams, engineers (James Conlon, Guanqun Yu, Joshua Guerrero, Patricia Racette, Christopher Maltman, Lucy Schaufer, Lucas Meachem, Los Angeles Opera Chorus and Orchestra)**
- Dutilleux: Sur le même accord; Les Citations; Mystère de l'instant & Timbres, espace, mouvement
  - Alexander Lipay & Dmitriy Lipay, engineers (Ludovic Morlot & Seattle Symphony)
- Reflections
  - Morten Lindberg, engineer (Øyvind Gimse, Geir Inge Lotsberg & Trondheimsolistene)
- Shadow of Sirius
  - Silas Brown & David Frost, engineers; Silas Brown
- Shostakovich: Under Stalin's Shadow – Symphonies Nos. 5, 8 & 9
  - Shawn Murphy & Nick Squire, engineers; Tim Martyn, mastering engineer (Andris Nelsons & Boston Symphony Orchestra)

=== Producer ===
Producer of the Year, Non-Classical

- **Greg Kurstin**
  - "Cheap Thrills" (Sia featuring Sean Paul)
  - "Hello" (Adele)
  - Love You to Death (Tegan and Sara)
  - "Million Years Ago" (Adele)
  - "Something in the Way You Move" (Ellie Goulding)
  - "Water Under the Bridge" (Adele)
- Benny Blanco
  - "Cold Water" (Major Lazer featuring Justin Bieber & MØ)
  - "Friends" (Francis and the Lights featuring Bon Iver)
  - "Kill Em with Kindness" (Selena Gomez)
  - "Love Yourself" (Justin Bieber)
  - "Luv" (Tory Lanez)
  - "Wild Love" (Cashmere Cat featuring The Weeknd & Francis and the Lights)
- Max Martin
  - "Can't Stop the Feeling!" (Justin Timberlake)
  - "Dangerous Woman" (Ariana Grande)
  - "Into You" (Ariana Grande)
  - "Just Like Fire" (Pink)
  - "Rise" (Katy Perry)
  - "Send My Love (To Your New Lover)" (Adele)
  - "Side to Side" (Ariana Grande featuring Nicki Minaj)
- Nineteen85
  - "For Free" (DJ Khaled featuring Drake)
  - "Hotline Bling" (Drake)
  - "Not Nice" (PartyNextDoor)
  - "One Dance" (Drake featuring Wizkid & Kyla)
  - "Rising Water" (James Vincent McMorrow)
  - Sept. 5th (dvsn)
  - "Too Good" (Drake featuring Rihanna)
  - We Move (James Vincent McMorrow)
- Ricky Reed
  - "Better" (Meghan Trainor featuring Yo Gotti)
  - "Cruel World" (Phantogram)
  - "Girls Talk Boys" (5 Seconds of Summer)
  - "HandClap" (Fitz and the Tantrums)
  - "Me Too" (Meghan Trainor)
  - "No" (Meghan Trainor)
  - "Sober" (DJ Snake featuring JRY)
  - "You Don't Get Me High Anymore" (Phantogram)

Producer of the Year, Classical

- **David Frost**
  - Bach: The Cello Suites According to Anna Magdalena (Matt Haimovitz)
  - Bates: Anthology of Fantastic Zoology (Riccardo Muti & Chicago Symphony Orchestra)
  - Beethoven: Piano Sonatas, Vol. 5 (Jonathan Biss)
  - Brahms & Dvořák: Serenades (Boston Symphony Chamber Players)
  - Fitelberg: Chamber Works (ARC Ensemble)
  - Ispirare (Melia Watras)
  - Overtures to Bach (Matt Haimovitz)
  - Schoenberg: Kol Nidre; Shostakovich: Suite on Verses of Michelangelo Buonarroti (Ildar Abdrazakov, Alberto Mizrahi, Riccardo Muti, Duain Wolfe, Chicago Symphony Orchestra and Chorus)
  - Shadow of Sirius (Jerry F. Junkin and The University Of Texas Wind Ensemble)
- Blanton Alspaugh
  - The Aeolian Organ at Duke University Chapel (Christopher Jacobson)
  - Bolcom: Canciones De Lorca & Prometheus (René Barbera, Jeffrey Biegel, Carl St. Clair, Pacific Chorale & Pacific Symphony)
  - Brahms: The Four Symphonies (Leonard Slatkin & Detroit Symphony Orchestra)
  - Copland: Appalachian Spring Complete Ballet; Hear Ye! Hear Ye! (Leonard Slatkin & Detroit Symphony Orchestra)
  - Corigliano: The Ghosts of Versailles (James Conlon, Guanqun Yu, Joshua Guerrero, Patricia Racette, Christopher Maltman, Lucy Schaufer, Lucas Meachem, Los Angeles Opera Chorus & Orchestra)
  - Dvořák: Symphonies Nos. 7 & 8 (Andrés Orozco-Estrada & Houston Symphony)
  - Dvořák: Symphony No. 6; Slavonic Dances (Andrés Orozoco-Estrada & Houston Symphony)
  - Floyd: Wuthering Heights (Joseph Mechavich, Heather Buck, Vale Rideout, Susanne Mentzer, Kelly Markgraf, Georgia Jarman, Milwaukee Symphony Orchestra & Florentine Opera Company)
- Marina A. Ledin, Victor Ledin
  - Friedman: Original Piano Compositions (Joseph Banowetz)
  - Moszkowski: From Foreign Lands (Martin West & San Francisco Ballet Orchestra)
- Judith Sherman
  - American First Sonatas (Cecile Licad)
  - Berlin: This Is The Life! (Rick Benjamin & Paragon Ragtime Orchestra)
  - Centennial Commissions, Vol. II (Charles Neidich & Pro Arte Quartet)
  - Gernsheim & Brahms: Piano Quintets (Reiko Uchida & Formosa Quartet)
  - Latin American & Spanish Masterpieces For Flute & Piano (Stephanie Jutt)
  - Similar Motion (Momenta Quartet)
  - Tchaikovsky: Complete Works For Violin & Orchestra (Jennifer Koh, Alexander Vedernikov & Odense Symphony Orchestra)
  - Tower: String Quartets Nos. 3-5 & Dumbarton Quintet (Miami String Quartet)
- Robina G. Young
  - Johnson: Considering Matthew Shepard (Craig Hella Johnson & Conspirare)
  - Lutosławski: Concerto For Orchestra; Brahms: Piano Quartet (Miguel Harth-Bedoya & Fort Worth Symphony Orchestra)
  - Mozart: Keyboard Music, Vols. 8 & 9 (Kristian Bezuidenhout)
  - Prokofiev: Piano Concertos Nos. 2 & 5 (Vadym Kholodenko, Miguel Harth-Bedoya & Fort Worth Symphony Orchestra)
  - A Wondrous Mystery – Renaissance Choral Music for Christmas (Stile Antico)

=== Remixer ===
Best Remixed Recording, Non-Classical

- **"Tearing Me Up" (RAC Remix)**
  - **André Allen Anjos, remixer (Bob Moses)**
- '"Cali Coast" (Psionics Remix)
  - Josh Williams, remixer (Soul Pacific)
- "Heavy Star Movin'" (staRo Remix)
  - staRo, remixer (The Silver Lake Chorus)
- "Nineteen Hundred and Eighty-Five" (Timo Maas & James Teej Remix)
  - Timo Maas & James Teej, remixers (Paul McCartney & Wings)
- "Only" (Kaskade × Lipless Remix)
  - Kaskade & Lipless, remixer (Ry X)
- "Wide Open" (Joe Goddard Remix)
  - Joe Goddard, remixer (The Chemical Brothers)

=== Surround Sound ===
Best Surround Sound Album

- **Dutilleux: Sur le même accord; Les Citations; Mystère de l'instant & Timbres, espace, mouvement**
  - **Alexander Lipay & Dmitriy Lipay, surround mix engineers; Dmitriy Lipay, surround mastering engineer; Dmitriy Lipay, surround producer (Ludovic Morlot & Seattle Symphony)**
- Johnson: Considering Matthew Shephard
  - Brad Michel, surround mix engineer; Brad Michel, surround mastering engineer; Robina G. Young, surround producer (Craig Hella Johnson & Conspirare)
- Maja S.K. Ratkje: And Sing ...
  - Morten Lindberg, surround mix engineer; Morten Lindberg, surround mastering engineer; Morten Lindberg, surround producer (Maja S.K. Ratkje, Cikada & Oslo Sinfonietta)
- Primus & The Chocolate Factory
  - Les Claypool, surround mix engineer; Stephen Marcussen, surround mastering engineer; Les Claypool, surround producer (Primus)
- Reflections
  - Morten Lindberg, surround mix engineer; Morten Lindberg, surround mastering engineer; Morten Lindberg, surround producer (Øyvind Gimse, Geir Inge Lotsberg & Trondheimsolistene)

=== Classical ===
Best Orchestral Performance

- **Shostakovich: Under Stalin's Shadow – Symphonies Nos. 5, 8 & 9**
  - **Andris Nelsons, conductor (Boston Symphony Orchestra)**
- Bates: Works for Orchestra
  - Michael Tilson Thomas, conductor (San Francisco Symphony)
- Ibert: Orchestral Works
  - Neeme Järvi, conductor (Orchestre de la Suisse Romande)
- Prokofiev: Symphony No. 5 In B-flat major, Op. 100
  - Mariss Jansons, conductor (Royal Concertgebouw Orchestra)
- Rouse: Odna Zhizn; Symphonies 3 & 4; Prospero's Rooms
  - Alan Gilbert, conductor (New York Philharmonic)

Best Opera Recording

- **Corigliano: The Ghosts of Versailles**
  - **James Conlon, conductor; Joshua Guerrero, Christopher Maltman, Lucas Meachem, Patricia Racette, Lucy Schaufer & Guanqun Yu, soloists; Blanton Alspaugh, producer; Mark Donahue, Fred Vogler & David L Williams (engineers) (Los Angeles Opera Orchestra and Chorus)**
- Handel: Giulio Cesare
  - Giovanni Antonini, conductor; Cecilia Bartoli, Philippe Jaroussky, Andreas Scholl & Anne-Sofie von Otter, soloists; Samuel Theis, producer (Il Giardino Armonico)
- Higdon: Cold Mountain
  - Miguel Harth-Bedoya, conductor; Emily Fons, Nathan Gunn, Isabel Leonard & Jay Hunter Morris, soloists; Elizabeth Ostrow, producer (The Santa Fe Opera Orchestra; Santa Fe Opera Apprentice Program for Singers)
- Mozart: Le Nozze De Figaro
  - Yannick Nézet-Séguin, conductor; Thomas Hampson, Christiane Karg, Luca Pisaroni & Sonya Yoncheva, soloists; Daniel Zalay, producer (Chamber Orchestra of Europe; Vocalensemble Rastatt)
- Szymanowski: Król Roger
  - Antonio Pappano, conductor; Georgia Jarman, Mariusz Kwiecień & Saimir Pirgu, soloists; Jonathan Allen, producer (Orchestra Of The Royal Opera House; Royal Opera Chorus)

Best Choral Performance

- **Penderecki Conducts Penderecki, Volume 1**
  - **Krzysztof Penderecki, conductor; Henryk Wojnarowski, choir director (Nikolay Didenko, Agnieszka Rehlis & Johanna Rusanen, soloists; Warsaw Philharmonic Orchestra, orchestra; Warsaw Philharmonic Choir, choir)**
- Himmelrand
  - Elisabeth Holte, conductor (Marianne Reidarsdatter Eriksen, Ragnfrid Lie & Matilda Sterby, soloists; Inger-Lise Ulsrud, accompanist; Uranienborg Vokalensemble, choir)
- Janáček: Glagolitic Mass
  - Edward Gardner, conductor; Håkon Matti Skrede, chorus master (Susan Bickley, Gábor Bretz, Sara Jakubiak & Stuart Skelton, soloists; Thomas Trotter, accompanist; Bergen Philharmonic Orchestra, orchestra; Bergen Cathedral Choir, Bergen Philharmonic Choir, Choir of Collegium Musicum & Edvard Grieg Kor, choirs)
- Lloyd: Bonhoeffer
  - Donald Nally, conductor (Malavika Godbole, John Grecia, Rebecca Harris & Thomas Mesa, soloists; The Crossing, ensemble)
- Steinberg: Passion Week
  - Steven Fox, conductor (The Clarion Choir)

Best Chamber Music/Small Ensemble Performance

- **Third Coast Percussion**
  - **Steve Reich**
- Fitelberg: Chamber Works
  - ARC Ensemble
- Reflections
  - Øyvind Gimse, Geir Inge Lotsberg & Trondheimsolistene
- Serious Business
  - Spektral Quartet
- Trios from Our Homelands
  - Lincoln Trio

Best Classical Instrumental Solo

- **Daugherty: Tales of Hemingway**
  - **Zuill Bailey; Giancarlo Guerrero, conductor (Nashville Symphony)**
- Adams, J.: Scheherazade.2
  - Leila Josefowicz; David Robertson, conductor (Chester Englander; St. Louis Symphony)
- Dvorák: Violin Concerto & Romance; Suk: Fantasy
  - Christian Tetzlaff; John Storgårds, conductor (Helsinki Philharmonic Orchestra)
- Mozart: Keyboard Music, Vols. 8 & 9
  - Kristian Bezuidenhout
- 1930's Violin Concertos, Vol. 2
  - Gil Shaham; Stéphane Denève, conductor (The Knights & Stuttgart Radio Symphony Orchestra)

Best Classical Solo Vocal Album

- **Schumann & Berg**
  - **Dorothea Röschmann; Mitsuko Uchida, accompanist**
- **Shakespeare Songs**
  - **Ian Bostridge; Antonio Pappano, accompanist (Michael Collins, Elizabeth Kenny, Lawrence Power & Adam Walker)**
- Monteverdi
  - Magdalena Kožená; Andrea Marcon, conductor (David Feldman, Michael Feyfar, Jakob Pilgram & Luca Tittoto; La Cetra Barockorchester Basel)
- Mozart: The Weber Sisters
  - Sabine Devieilhe; Raphaël Pichon, conductor (Pygmalion)
- Verismo
  - Anna Netrebko; Antonio Pappano, conductor (Yusif Eyvazov; Coro Dell'Accademia Nazionale Di Santa Cecilia; Orchestra Dell'Accademia Nazionale Di Santa Cecilia)

Best Classical Compendium

- **Daugherty: Tales of Hemingway; American Gothic; Once Upon a Castle**
  - **Giancarlo Guerrero, conductor; Tim Handley, producer**
- Gesualdo
  - Tõnu Kaljuste, conductor; Manfred Eicher, producer
- Vaughan Williams: Discoveries
  - Martyn Brabbins, conductor; Ann McKay, producer
- Wolfgang: Passing Through
  - Judith Farmer & Gernot Wolfgang, producers
- Zappa: 200 Motels
  - The Suites – Esa-Pekka Salonen, conductor; Frank Filipetti & Gail Zappa, producers

Best Contemporary Classical Composition

- **Daugherty: Tales of Hemingway**
  - **Michael Daugherty, composer (Zuill Bailey, Giancarlo Guerrero & Nashville Symphony)**
- Bates: Anthology of Fantastic Zoology
  - Mason Bates, composer (Riccardo Muti & Chicago Symphony Orchestra)
- Higdon: Cold Mountain
  - Jennifer Higdon, composer; Gene Scheer, librettist
- Theofanidis: Bassoon Concerto
  - Christopher Theofanidis, composer (Martin Kuuskmann, Barry Jekowsky & Northwest Sinfonia)
- Winger: Conversations with Nijinsky
  - C. F. Kip Winger, composer (Martin West & San Francisco Ballet Orchestra)

=== Music Video/Film ===
Best Music Video

- **"Formation" – Beyoncé**
  - **Melina Matsoukas, video director; Candice Dragonas, Juliette Larthe, Nathan Scherrer & Inga Veronique, video producers**
- "River" – Leon Bridges
  - Miles Jay, video director; Dennis Beier, Allison Kunzman & Saul Levitz, video producers
- "Up&Up" – Coldplay
  - Vania Heymann & Gal Muggia, video directors; Candice Dragonas, Juliette Larthe, Nathan Scherrer & Natan Schottenfels, video producers
- "Gosh" – Jamie XX
  - Romain Gavras, video director; Iconoclast, video producers
- "Upside Down & Inside Out" – OK Go
  - Damian Kulash Jr. & Trish Sie, video directors; Melissa Murphy & John O'Grady, video producers

Best Music Film

- **The Beatles: Eight Days a Week The Touring Years – (The Beatles)**
  - **Ron Howard, video director; Brian Grazer, Ron Howard, Scott Pascucci & Nigel Sinclair, video producers**
- I'll Sleep When I'm Dead – Steve Aoki
  - Justin Krook, video director; Brent Almond, Matt Colon, David Gelb, Ryan Kavanaugh, Michael Theanne, Happy Walters & Matthew Weaver, video producers
- Lemonade – Beyoncé
  - Beyoncé Knowles Carter & Kahlil Joseph, video directors; Ed Burke, Steve Pamon, Todd Tourso, Dora Melissa Vargas, Erinn Williams & Beyoncé Knowles Carter, video producer
- The Music of Strangers – Yo-Yo Ma & The Silk Road Ensemble
  - Morgan Neville, video director; Caitrin Rogers, video producer
- American Saturday Night: Live From The Grand Ole Opry – (Various Artists)
  - George J. Flanigen IV, video director; Steve Buchanan, John Burke & Lindsey Clark, Robert Deaton, Pete Fisher & George J. Flanigen IV, video producers

== Special Merit Awards ==
=== MusiCares Person of the Year ===
- Tom Petty

=== Lifetime Achievement Award ===
- Shirley Caesar
- Ahmad Jamal
- Charley Pride
- Jimmie Rodgers
- Nina Simone
- Sly Stone
- The Velvet Underground

=== Trustees Award ===
- Thom Bell
- Mo Ostin
- Ralph S. Peer

=== Technical Grammy Award ===
- Alan Dower Blumlein

=== Music Educator Award ===
- Keith Hancock (of Tesoro High School in Las Flores, California)

== Grammy Hall of Fame inductions ==
Title	Artist	Record label	Year of release	Genre	Format
"ABC"	The Jackson 5	Motown	1970	R&B	Single
"Changes"	David Bowie	RCA	1971	Art pop	Single
"City of New Orleans"	Arlo Guthrie	Reprise Records	1972	Folk	Single
"(Hep-Hep!) The Jumpin' Jive"	Cab Calloway and His Orchestra	Vocalion	1939	Swing	Single
"I Can't Make You Love Me"	Bonnie Raitt	Capitol	1991	Pop	Single
"I Get Around"	The Beach Boys	Capitol	1964	California Sound	Single
"I Got You Babe"	Sonny & Cher	Atco	1965	Pop	Single
"Jailhouse Rock"	Elvis Presley	RCA	1957	Rock and roll	Single
Lady Sings the Blues	Billie Holiday	Clef	1956	Jazz	Album
"Losing My Religion"	R.E.M.	Warner Bros.	1991	Alternative rock	Single
"Maggie May"	Rod Stewart	Mercury	1971	Rock	Single
"Mission: Impossible"	Lalo Schifrin	Dot	1967	Theme music	Single
Okie from Muskogee	Merle Haggard	Capitol	1969	Country	Album
Sign o' the Times	Prince	Paisley Park and Warner Bros.	1987	R&B	Album
"Smells Like Teen Spirit"	Nirvana	DGC	1991	Grunge	Single
"Smoke on the Water"	Deep Purple	Warner Bros.	1973	Hard Rock	Single
"Stack O' Lee Blues"	Mississippi John Hurt	Okeh	1928	Blues	Single
"Statesboro Blues"	Blind Willie McTell	Victor	1928	Blues	Single
Straight Outta Compton	N.W.A	Ruthless and Priority	1988	Gangsta rap	Album
"Thank You (Falettinme Be Mice Elf Agin)"	Sly & The Family Stone	Epic	1969	Funk	Single
"Wake Up Little Susie"	The Everly Brothers	Cadence	1957	Country	Single
"The Wanderer"	Dion	Laurie	1961	R&B	Single
"When the Saints Go Marching In"	Louis Armstrong and His Orchestra	Decca	1938	Jazz	Single
"You Always Hurt the One You Love"	Mills Brothers	Decca	1944	Pop standard	Single
"You Don't Own Me"	Lesley Gore	Mercury	1963	Pop	Single

== In Memoriam ==
Prior to the "In Memoriam" segment, Pentatonix paid tribute to Al Jarreau who died on the same day as the ceremony. The following people appeared in the In Memoriam segment:

- Prince
- Leonard Cohen
- Keith Emerson
- Greg Lake
- John Wetton
- Sharon Jones
- Wayne Jackson
- Rod Temperton
- James Jamerson Jr.
- Ralph Stanley
- Merle Haggard
- Sonny James
- Scotty Moore
- Joey Feek
- Bobby Vee
- Lonnie Mack
- Butch Trucks
- Juan Gabriel
- Emilio Navaira
- Mose Allison
- Toots Thielemans
- Gato Barbieri
- Nat Hentoff
- Rudy Van Gelder
- George Michael
- Debbie Reynolds
- Guy Clark
- John D. Loudermilk
- Milt Okun
- Willie Joe Ligon
- Stanley "Buckwater" Dural Jr.
- Billy Paul
- Marvell Thomas
- Bernie Worrell
- Chips Moman
- Pete Fountain
- Frank Sinatra Jr.
- Patrice Munsel
- Zhou Xiaoyan
- Sir Neville Marriner
- Phife Dawg
- Lee O'Denat
- Muhammad Ali
- Leon Russell
- Howard Kaufman
- Bill Ham
- Phil Chess
- Bob Krasnow
- Tony Martell
- Mary Stewart
- James M. Nederlander
- Chris Stone
- Remo Belli
- Sir George Martin

== Multiple nominations and awards ==
The following received multiple nominations:

Nine:

- Beyoncé

Eight:

- Drake
- Rihanna
- Kanye West

Seven:

- Chance the Rapper

Six:

- Tom Elmhirst

Five:

- Adele
- Tyler Joseph

Four:

- Justin Bieber
- Benny Blanco
- David Bowie
- Tom Coyne
- Mike Dean
- Kirk Franklin
- Greg Kurstin
- Max Martin
- Lori McKenna
- Maren Morris

Three:

- BJ the Chicago Kid
- The Chainsmokers
- John Daversa
- Tom Elmhirst
- Lukas Forchhammer
- Jaycen Joshua
- Morten Lindberg
- Randy Merrill
- Mike Will Made It
- Ted Nash
- Nineteen85
- Antonio Pappano
- Morten Ristorp
- Noah "40" Shebib
- Shellback
- Sia
- Twenty One Pilots
- Jack White

Two:

- Blanton Alspaugh
- The Avett Brothers
- Neal Avron
- John Beasley
- William Bell
- Boi-1da
- Julian Burg
- John Burke
- Noel "Gadget" Campbell
- Shirley Caesar
- Brandy Clark
- Jacob Collier
- Diplo
- Kyle Dixon
- The-Dream
- Fat Joe
- Frank Filipetti
- Flume
- Stefan Forrest
- David Frost
- Robbie Fulks
- Chris Gehringer
- Rhiannon Giddens
- Gojira
- Ariana Grande
- Natalie Grant
- Giancarlo Guerrero
- Halsey
- Lalah Hathaway
- Emile Haynie
- Fred Hersch
- Hillary Scott & the Scott Family
- Sarah Jarosz
- Dave Kutch
- Kendrick Lamar
- Miranda Lambert
- Lil Wayne
- Alexander Lipay
- Dmitriy Lipay
- Liam Nolan
- Lukas Graham
- Remy Ma
- Yo-Yo Ma & the Silk Road Ensemble
- Manny Marroquin
- Richard Martin
- Brad Mehldau
- French Montana
- Ennio Morricone
- Thomas Newman
- Anderson .Paak
- PartyNextDoor
- Alex Pasco
- Pink
- Pluss
- Kelly Price
- Radiohead
- Roddie Romero
- ScHoolboy Q
- Amy Schumer
- John Scofield
- Rob Sevier
- Ken Shipley
- Sturgill Simpson
- Skrillex
- Michael Stein
- 2 Chainz
- Keith Urban
- Stuart White
- Robina G. Young

The following received multiple awards:

Six:

- Tom Elmhirst

Five:

- Adele

Four:

- David Bowie
- Greg Kurstin

Three:

- Chance the Rapper

Two:

- Beyoncé
- Julian Burg
- Jacob Collier
- Tom Coyne
- Drake
- Kirk Franklin
- Giancarlo Guerrero
- Lalah Hathaway
- Emile Haynie
- Hillary Scott & the Scott Family
- Sarah Jarosz
- Max Martin
- Randy Merrill
- Ted Nash
- John Scofield
- Shellback

== Changes ==
In June 2016, the Grammy organization announced a few minor changes to the voting and awarding process.

As of 2017, recordings released solely through streaming services became eligible to enter the award process. These recordings will have to be available through streaming platforms. Applicable streaming services are paid subscription, full catalog, on-demand streaming/limited download platforms that have existed as such within the United States for at least one full year as of the submission deadline. All recordings entered must have an assigned International Standard Recording Code (ISRC).

=== Best New Artist guidelines ===
Existing Best New Artist rules were amended to remove the album barrier given current trends in how new music and developing artists are released and promoted. Currently many new artists first release singles, tracks, or EPs rather than full albums. To become eligible in the category of Best New Artist, the artist, duo, or group:

- Must have released a minimum of five singles/tracks or one album, but no more than 30 singles/tracks or three albums.
- May not have entered the category more than three times, including as a performing member of an established group.
- Must have achieved a breakthrough into the public consciousness and impacted the musical landscape during the eligibility period.

=== Blues categories ===
The Best Blues Album category will branch into two distinct categories:

- Best Traditional Blues Album (Blues recordings with traditional blues song and harmonic structures, including various subgenres such as Delta blues, Piedmont blues, jump/swing blues, Chicago blues, and classic/Southern soul).
- Best Contemporary Blues Album (Recordings which may employ non-traditional blues rhythms such as funk, hip-hop, reggae, and rock, or which feature contemporary techniques such as synthesizers or loops).

It means a return to the situation prior to 2012, the year the categories were merged in a major overhaul.

=== Best Rap/Sung Collaboration category renamed ===
The Best Rap/Sung Collaboration category (in the Rap field) has been renamed as Best Rap/Sung Performance, to allow solo performances, a result of "the current state and future trajectory of rap by expanding the category beyond collaborations between rappers and vocalists to include recordings by a solo artist who blurs the lines between rapping and singing."

Additional amendments were made to the number and type of music creators recognized in the categories of Best Choral Performance and Best Jazz Vocal Album.
