= Sierra Hull =

American singer-songwriter

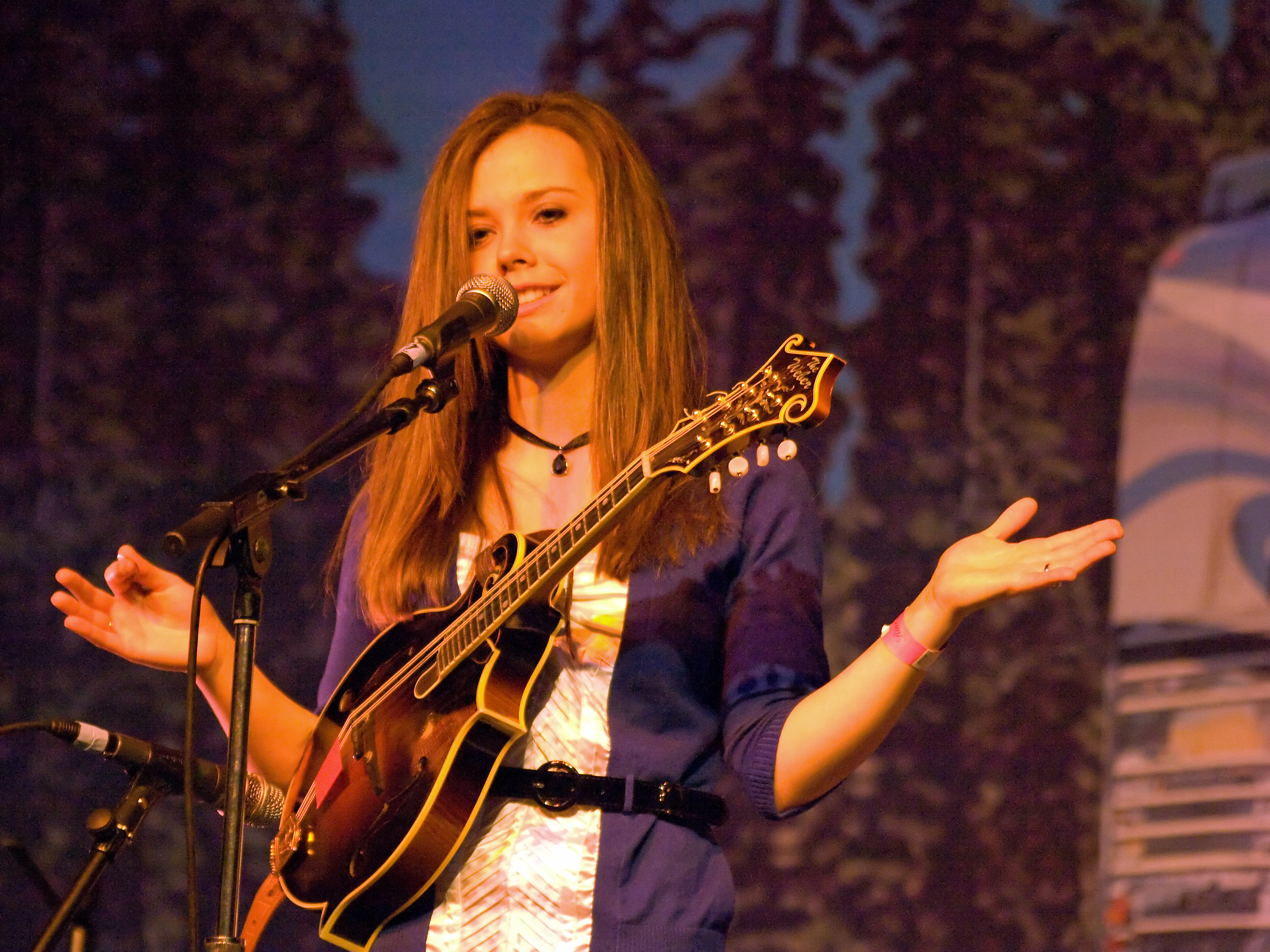
- Hull in 2009

Background information
- Born: Sierra Dawn Hull; September 27, 1991 (age 35); Byrdstown, Tennessee, U.S.
- Genre: Bluegrass
- Occupations: Musician; singer; songwriter
- Instruments: Mandolin; guitar; vocals
- Years active: 2002–present
- Label: Rounder
- Spouse: Justin Moses (m. 2017)
- Website: www.sierrahull.com

Sierra Dawn Hull (born September 27, 1991) is an American bluegrass singer-songwriter, mandolinist, and guitarist.

Playing mandolin from the age of eight, Hull was signed to Rounder Records at the age of 13 and released her debut vocal album, Secrets, in 2008 at the age of 16. The album peaked at No. 2 on the Billboard Top Bluegrass Albums chart. Her second album, Daybreak, was released on March 8, 2011.

She released two more albums for Rounder, Weighted Mind (2016) and 25 Trips (2020); both albums peaked at No. 1 on the Billboard Top Bluegrass Album chart.

The following albums, A Tip Toe High Wire (2025) and The Movements (2026), were released independently.

Hull has received numerous awards from International Bluegrass Music Association, and was the first woman ever to receive the Mandolin Player of the Year award.

== Early life and career ==
Sierra Hull was born and raised in Byrdstown, Tennessee and attended Pickett County High School before accepting a Presidential Scholarship to study at the Berklee College of Music.

Hull began playing the mandolin at the age of eight and put out the album Angel Mountain at 10. She was soon playing jam sessions with other musicians in her family, and by 2001 she was entering local talent contests. Her parents, Stacy and Brenda Hull, took her to numerous bluegrass festivals and it was during an International Bluegrass Music Association festival that she came to the attention of Rounder Records chief talent scout Ken Irwin.

At age 11 she was mentored and befriended by Alison Krauss, herself once a child prodigy on the fiddle. Krauss invited Hull to perform with her on the Grand Ole Opry. Hull and Krauss, along with Dan Tyminski, performed at the White House on November 21, 2011.

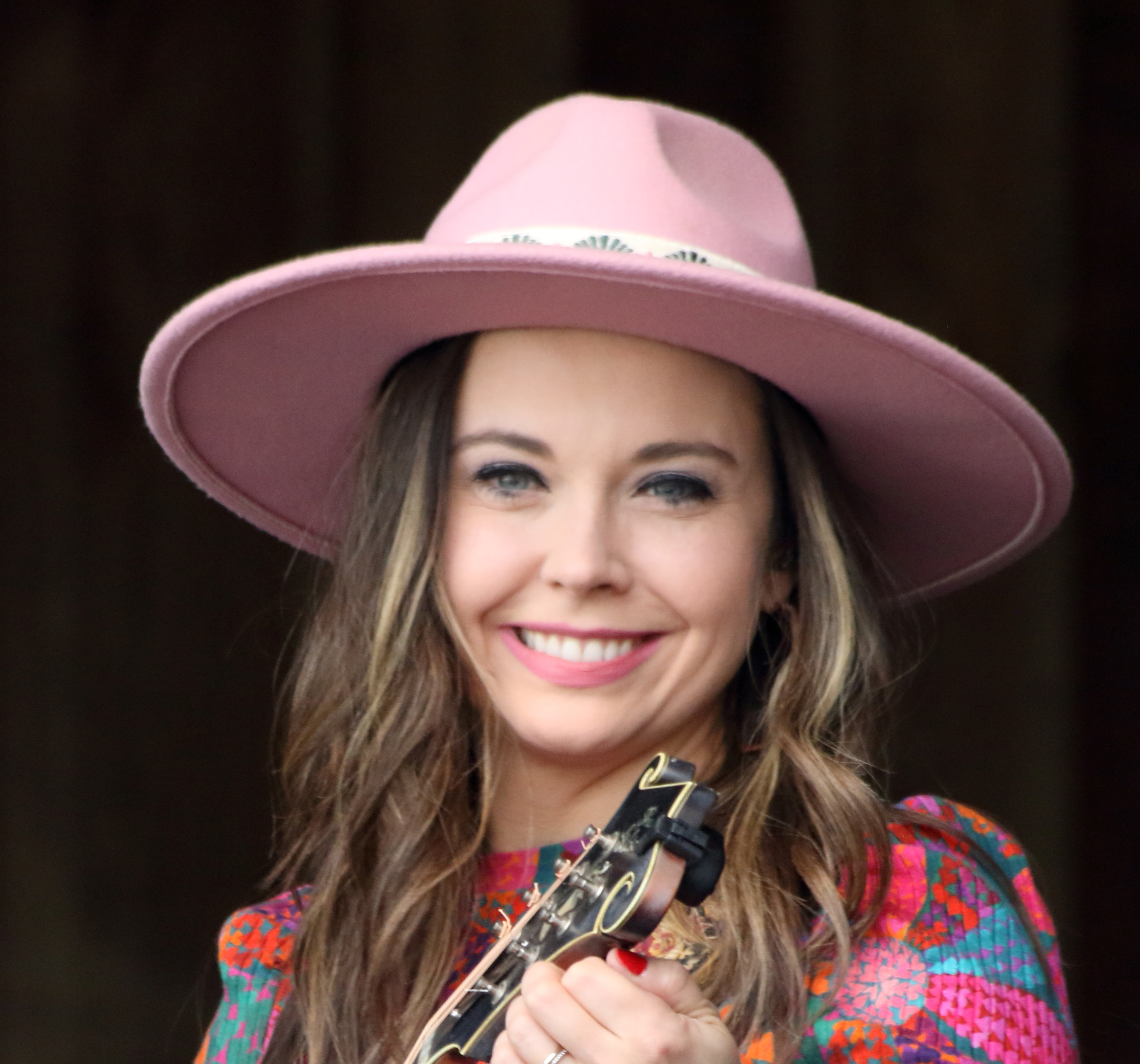
Sierra Hull performing at MerleFest in 2024.

Hull has won eleven International Bluegrass Music Association awards between 2010 and 2025, including winning the Mandolin Player of the Year award in 2016, 2017, 2018, 2021, 2022, 2023 and 2025.

Hull received the Bluegrass Star Award, presented by the Bluegrass Heritage Foundation, on October 19, 2013. The award is bestowed upon bluegrass artists who do an exemplary job of advancing traditional bluegrass music and bringing it to new audiences while preserving its character and heritage.

== Touring ==
Hull performed with the band Highway 111 at the Gettysburg Bluegrass festival in 2005. She continued to tour, even while she attended Berklee College of Music.

Since 2021, Sierra Hull has toured with Béla Fleck on his Live Heart tour, as a part of his all-star bluegrass band, across North America and Europe. In December 2025, Hull toured with Béla Fleck and the Flecktones, replacing Howard Levy, who couldn't tour due to health issues.

Hull has also recorded and toured with Cory Wong, featured as a supporting act and collaborative partner on a 2022 tour.

Sierra Hull has performed on various music festivals, including Willie Nelson’s Outlaw Music Festival Tour.

== Recordings ==
=== Secrets ===
Hull's vocal debut album on Rounder Records, released in May 2008, was co-produced by Alison Krauss and Ron Block which follows a self-released CD Angel Mountain, in 2002. The production by Hull and Ron Block paid tribute and honored the tradition and style of bluegrass music. The album contained 3 original songs penned by Hull. She was just 15 when she recorded the album and 16 when it was released.

=== Daybreak ===
On her 2011 second release on Rounder Records, the 20-year-old wrote seven of the twelve songs. It was produced by Alison Krauss & Union Station bassist Barry Bales. The album features collaborations with Bryan Sutton on guitar and Randy Kohrs on dobro. Guest singers include Dan Tyminski, Shawn Lane and Ronnie Bowman.

=== Features ===
Hull was a guest vocalist with lead singer James Adkins on the male-female duet "Love Song", featured on the 2015 self-titled album from Americana group Big Virginia Sky.

=== Weighted Mind ===
Released on January 29, 2016, Weighted Mind, Hull's third LP, was produced by the highly regarded banjo player Béla Fleck, who encouraged Hull to consider recording it solo. Hull, however, decided to enlist an accompanist, bassist Ethan Jodziewicz, who is featured on every track. The album also includes vocal contributions by Alison Krauss, Abigail Washburn, and Rhiannon Giddens.

NPR reviewer Jewly Hight called Weighted Mind a "stunning coming-of-age album," adding that "Hull has joined the rarefied company of Nickel Creek expats Chris Thile, Sara Watkins and Sean Watkins, pedigreed virtuosos whose youthful, searching musical minds have taken them into postmodern singer-songwriter territory and beyond."

=== Treasure Of The Broken Land: The Songs Of Mark Heard ===
Hull contributed her performance of "Strong Hand of Love" to a Mark Heard tribute album entitled "Treasure Of The Broken Land: The Songs Of Mark Heard" (Storm Weathered Records) in 2017.

=== 25 Trips ===
Released on February 28, 2020, co-produced by Hull and producer / engineer Shani Gandhi, features guitarist Mike Seal, bassist Ethan Jodziewicz, violinist Alex Hargreaves, and fiddler Christian Sedelmyer, together with bassist Viktor Krauss, guitarist Bryan Sutton, multi-instrumentalist Stuart Duncan, and steel guitarist Paul Franklin, and guest appearances by Molly Tuttle, Ron Block, Mindy Smith, Ronnie Bowman, Katie Pruitt, Angel Snow, and Hull's husband, multi-instrumentalist Justin Moses.

Liam Lewis opined, "25 Trips is an eclectic album, with a contemporary feel, showcasing Hull’s songwriting and exceptional vocals, crystal clear but with emotion and character, on 13 songs, self and co-written on the pleasures and travails of becoming the person and the musician she is today."

Hull appeared as one of the musicians on Cuttin' Grass, the 2020 bluegrass album by Sturgill Simpson.

=== A Tip Toe High Wire ===
Released on Mar 7, 2025, this album is her first self-published album since her debut, Angel Mountain, in 2002. It features Tim O'Brien, Aoife O'Donovan, and Béla Fleck. Rolling Stone reported that the album name is a "[nod] to the fine line that Hull walks, keeping one foot in tradition and the other in the progressive quest."

The album won a nomination in 2026 Grammy Awards for the Best Bluegrass Album, while the songs "Spitfire" and "Lord, That's a Long Way" were nominated for the Best Americana Roots Song and Best Instrumental Composition.

=== The Movements ===
In 2022, the FreshGrass Institute, an initiative by the FreshGrass Foundation, commissioned a bluegrass concerto from Hull. A concerto, consisting of three movements, debuted live in 2022. The concerto was co-written by Hull and her bandmates: Avery Merritt, Erik Coveney, Mark Raudabaugh, and Shaun Richardson.

Sierra Hull has often live performed the third movement from the concerto. In 2025, Sierra Hull and her band recorded a line in-studio version.

Released as a recording on April 10, 2026, The Movements is a bluegrass concerto following the fast-slow-fast structure, "blending composed passages with room for improvisation."

== Personal life ==
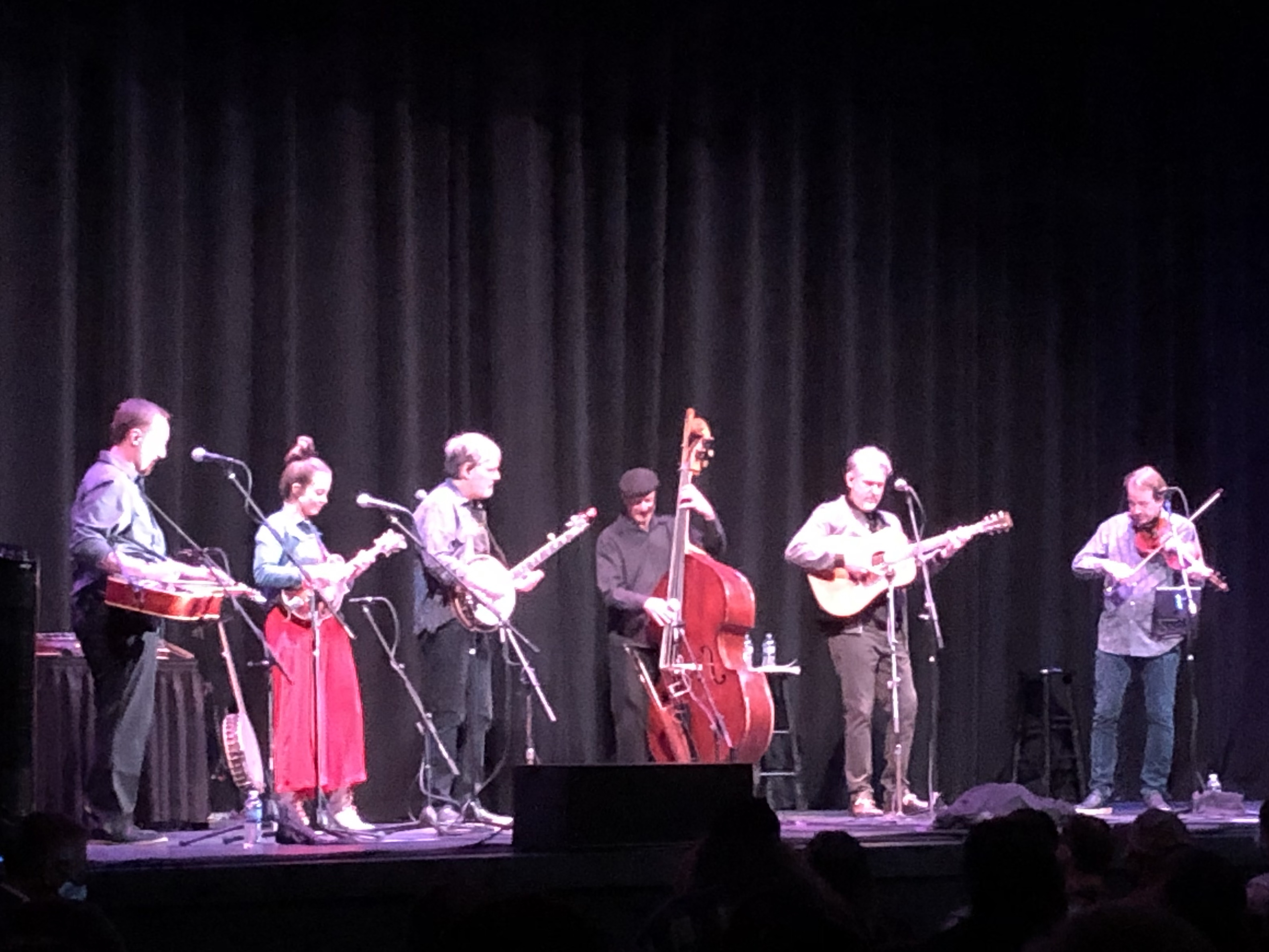
Hull (mandolin, second from left) and her husband Justin Moses (dobro, left) in 2022, playing on tour for Bela Fleck's album My Bluegrass Heart.

Hull has a brother, Cody, and is a distant relative of former United States Secretary of State Cordell Hull.

She married fellow bluegrass musician Justin Moses on May 14, 2017. Hull and Moses tour together.

Hull lives in Nashville.

== Discography ==
=== Albums ===
Title	Details	Peak chart positions		Sales
Title	Details	US Grass	US Heat	Sales
Angel Mountain	Release date: 2002; Label: self-released	—	—	
Secrets	Release date: May 6, 2008; Label: Rounder Records	2	—	
Daybreak	Release date: March 8, 2011; Label: Rounder Records	5	—	
Weighted Mind	Release date: January 29, 2016; Label: Rounder Records	1	5	
25 Trips	Release date: February 28, 2020; Label: Rounder Records	1	—	
A Tip Toe High Wire	Release date: March 7, 2025; Label: self-released	—	—	
The Movements	Release date: April 10, 2026; Label: self-released	—	—	
"—" denotes releases that did not chart

=== Other singles ===
Year	Single	Artist	Album
2007	"Hullarious"	Sierra Hull	An American Tradition
2008	"Just As I Am"	Sierra Hull	Billy: The Early Years
2010	"Gospel Plow"	The Lovell Sisters, Bearfoot, Sierra Hull & The New Generation Jam	MerleFest Live
2010	"Big Sciota"	The Lovell Sisters, Bearfoot, Sierra Hull & The New Generation Jam	MerleFest Live
2011	"Rockin' Around The Christmas Tree"	Sixties Invasion featuring Sierra Hull	Rockin' Around The Christmas Tree
2013	"Cups (When I'm Gone)"	The Bankesters with Sierra Hull	Love Has Wheels
2014	"You're a Flower Blooming in the Wildwood"	Mac Wiseman with Sierra Hull	Songs from My Mother's Hand
2014	"Promises"	Jeff Pippin and the Apple Valley Band featuring Sierra Hull	A Malibugrass Christmas
2014	"Let the Wind Be My Friend"	Jon Weisberger featuring Sierra Hull & the Lonesome Heirs	I've Been Mostly Awake
2014	"New Camptown Races"	David Naiditch featuring Sierra Hull, Dennis Caplinger, Jake Workman, Austin Ward, Rob Ickes & Stuart Duncan	Bluegrass in the Backwoods
2014	"Little Rock Getaway"	David Naiditch featuring Sierra Hull, Dennis Caplinger, Jake Workman, Christian Ward, Rob Ickes & Austin Ward	Bluegrass in the Backwoods
2014	"The Smooch On the Porch / Bus Stop Reel"	David Naiditch featuring Sierra Hull, Jake Workman & Austin Ward	Bluegrass in the Backwoods
2014	"Jamboree"	David Naiditch featuring Dennis Caplinger, Sierra Hull, Rob Ickes, Christian Ward, Jake Workman & Austin Ward	Bluegrass in the Backwoods
2014	"I Always Do"	Missy Werner featuring Jon Weisberger, Megan McCormick, Stephen Mougin, Maggie Estes White, Thomas Wywrot, Artie Werner & Sierra Hull	Turn This Heart Around
2014	"Wish I Was"	Missy Werner featuring Sarah Siskind, Artie Werner, Megan McCormick, Jon Weisberger, Sierra Hull, Maggie Estes White & Thomas Wywrot	Turn This Heart Around
2014	"Cloudless Blue"	Missy Werner featuring Sierra Hull, Megan McCormick, Jon Weisberger, Maggie Estes White, Thomas Wywrot & Artie Werner	Turn This Heart Around
2014	"Dead Man Walking"	Missy Werner featuring Thomas Wywrot, Larry Cordle, Val Storey, Sierra Hull, Megan McCormick, Jon Weisberger & Maggie Estes White	Turn This Heart Around
2014	"Come Back to Me"	Missy Werner featuring Megan McCormick, Jon Weisberger, Maggie Estes White, Thomas Wywrot & Sierra Hull	Turn This Heart Around
2015	"Can't Help Yourself"	Cindy Morgan featuring Gabe Dixon & Sierra Hull	Bows & Arrows
2015	"Seneca Square Dance"	Ron Block featuring Sierra Hull	Hogan's House of Music
2017	"They Call The Wind Maria"	Bobby Osborne featuring Alison Brown, Sierra Hull & Stuart Duncan	Original
2017	"Country Boy"	Bobby Osborne featuring Alison Brown, Sierra Hull & Stuart Duncan	Original
2017	"Kentucky Morning"	Bobby Osborne featuring Dale Ann Bradley, Darrell Scott, Rob Ickes, Sierra Hull & Stuart Duncan	Original
2017	"I've Gotta Get a Message to You"	Bobby Osborne featuring Alison Brown, Claire Lynch, Rob Ickes, Sierra Hull, Stuart Duncan & Trey Hensley	Original
2017	"Roanoke"	David Naiditch featuring Stuart Duncan, Sierra Hull & Jake Workman	Bluegrass That Swings
2017	"Back Home Again in Indiana"	David Naiditch featuring Stuart Duncan, Sierra Hull & Jake Workman	Bluegrass That Swings
2017	"East Tennessee Blues"	David Naiditch featuring Stuart Duncan, Sierra Hull & Jake Workman	Bluegrass That Swings
2017	"All of Me"	David Naiditch featuring Stuart Duncan, Sierra Hull & Jake Workman	Bluegrass That Swings
2017	"Cattle in the Cane"	David Naiditch featuring Stuart Duncan, Sierra Hull & Jake Workman	Bluegrass That Swings
2017	"Exactly Like You"	David Naiditch featuring Stuart Duncan, Sierra Hull & Jake Workman	Bluegrass That Swings
2017	"Sweet Georgia Brown"	David Naiditch featuring Stuart Duncan, Sierra Hull, Jake Workman & Rob Ickes	Bluegrass That Swings
2017	"Twinkle Little Star"	David Naiditch featuring Stuart Duncan, Sierra Hull, Jake Workman & Rob Ickes	Bluegrass That Swings
2017	"Ookpik Waltz"	David Naiditch featuring Stuart Duncan, Sierra Hull, Jake Workman & Rob Ickes	Bluegrass That Swings
2017	"The Guitar"	Mac Wiseman featuring Sierra Hull & Justin Moses	I Sang the Song (Life of the Voice with a Heart)
2017	"I Need Thee Every Hour"	Shane Clark featuring Sierra Hull	The Hymn Awakening
2017	"Strong Hand of Love"	Sierra Hull	Treasure of the Broken Land: The Songs of Mark Heard
2018	"Swept Away"	Missy Raines featuring Alison Brown, Beck Buller, Molly Tuttle & Sierra Hull	Swept Away
2018	"Merlefest Mando Mania"	Tony Williamson featuring Sam Bush & Sierra Hull with Rebecca Lovell, Mike Compton, Darin Aldridge, Tim O'Brien, James Nash, Tom Rozum & Barry Mitterhoff	Heritage
2022	"Over the Line"	Molly Tuttle & Golden Highway featuring Sierra Hull	Crooked Tree

=== Music videos ===
Year	Title	Director
2011	"Easy Come, Easy Go"	David McClister
2011	"Someone Like You"	Brad Paul
2011	"Chasin' Skies"	Brad Paul
2011	"Tell Me Tomorrow"	Brad Paul
2011	"Daybreak"	David McClister
2016	"Black River"	

== Awards and nominations ==
Year	Association	Category	Nominated work	Result
2010	IBMA Awards	Recorded Event of the Year (with various artists)	"Proud To Be A Daughter of Bluegrass"	Won
2016	IBMA Awards	Mandolin Player of the Year	Sierra Hull	Won
2017	IBMA Awards	Mandolin Player of the Year	Sierra Hull	Won
2017	IBMA Awards	Recorded Event of the Year (with Bobby Osborne and various artists)	"I've Gotta Get a Message to You"	Won
2017	Grammy Awards	Best Folk Album	Weighted Mind	Nominated
2018	IBMA Awards	Mandolin Player of the Year	Sierra Hull	Won
2018	IBMA Awards	Recorded Event of the Year (with Missy Raines, Alison Brown, Becky Buller, and Molly Tuttle)	"Swept Away"	Won
2021	IBMA Awards	Mandolin Player of the Year	Sierra Hull	Won
2022	IBMA Awards	Mandolin Player of the Year	Sierra Hull	Won
2023	IBMA Awards	Mandolin Player of the Year	Sierra Hull	Won
2025	IBMA Awards	Mandolin Player of the Year	Sierra Hull	Won
2026	Grammy Awards	Best Bluegrass Album	A Tip Toe High Wire	Nominated
2026	Grammy Awards	Best American Roots Song	"Spitfire"	Nominated
2026	Grammy Awards	Best Americana Performance	"Boom"	Nominated
2026	Grammy Awards	Best Instrumental Composition	"Lord, That's a Long Way"	Nominated
