= Chirality (disambiguation) =

Chirality (handedness) is a property of asymmetry.

Chirality may also refer to:

- Chirality (chemistry), a property of molecules having a non-superimposable mirror image
- Chiral media, an electromagnetic propagation in chiral media
- Chirality (mathematics), the property of a figure not being identical to its mirror image
- Chirality (physics), when a phenomenon is not identical to its mirror image
- Homochirality, the property of humans having non-superimposable mirror forms, from hands to molecules.
- Chirality (journal), an academic journal dealing with chiral chemistry
- Chirality (manga), a 4-volume yuri manga series written and illustrated by author Satoshi Urushihara
- Chirality (album), a 2014 solo piano album by American pianist John Burke

== See also ==
- Gastropod shell#Chirality
- Chiral knot
- Handedness
