= Christian Jacob =

Christian Jacob may refer to:

- Christian Jacob (musician) (born 1958), French jazz pianist
- Christian Jacob (politician) (born 1959), former Minister of French Civil Service
