= Chirality (album) =

Studio album by John Burke
- Released: 2014
- Recorded: 2014
- Genre: New-age
- Length: 55:29
- Label: Independent

John Burke chronology
Reverie (2015)	Chirality (2014)	Orogen (2017)

Chirality is a solo piano album by American pianist John Burke. In homage to Johann Sebastian Bach, Chirality used the chemical property of asymmetry as inspiration for melodies and mirrored countermelodies. On SoloPiano.com, Chirality won Jazz Album of the Year and became a finalist for Album of the Year

== Track listing ==
No.	Title	Length
1.	"Echoes"	4:38
2.	"Cloud Marching"	4:59
3.	"Snowstill"	5:32
4.	"Slipstream"	3:40
5.	"Orbits"	6:04
6.	"And Beyond"	7:25
7.	"Nova"	5:22
8.	"The Coming Together"	3:48
9.	"A Greater Leap"	6:58
10.	"Chirality"	7:03
