= Tierney Sutton =

American jazz singer (born 1963)

- Born: June 28, 1963 (age 63); Omaha, Nebraska, U.S.
- Genres: Jazz, vocal jazz
- Occupation: Singer
- Years active: 1990s–present
- Labels: Telarc, BFM Jazz
- Website: tierneysutton.com

Tierney Sutton (born June 28, 1963) is an American jazz singer.

== Career ==
Sutton was born in Omaha, Nebraska, but grew up in Milwaukee, Wisconsin. She received a bachelor's degree from Wesleyan University in Middletown, Connecticut, majoring in Russian studies, and attended the Berklee College of Music in Boston. She was runner-up to Teri Thornton in the 1998 vocal competition at the Thelonious Monk Institute of Jazz, in Washington, DC.

For more than 20 years, Sutton has led the Tierney Sutton Band with pianist Christian Jacob, bassists Trey Henry and Kevin Axt, and drummer Ray Brinker. The band is an incorporated unit and makes all musical and business decisions together. They tour throughout the world and have headlined at Carnegie Hall, The Hollywood Bowl, and Jazz at Lincoln Center.

Sutton has been a Bahaʼi since 1981 and explains her band's arranging style as "based on the principle of consultation – the band is very much run on Baha'i principles. There is very much a sense that what we do is essentially a spiritual thing and everyone's voice needs to be heard."

Paris Sessions (Varèse Sarabande, 2014), featuring guitarist Serge Merlaud and bassist Kevin Axt, received a Grammy Award nomination for Best Jazz Vocal Album in 2014, while The Sting Variations was nominated in the same category in 2016. Pianist Christian Jacob composed and arranged soundtrack music for the Clint Eastwood production Sully, which was performed by Sutton and the band.

Sutton appeared with Frank Sinatra, Jr. on Patrick Williams’ 2015 CD Home Suite Home, performing "I’ve Been Around." The recording earned a Grammy Award nomination for Best Large Jazz Ensemble Album.

== Discography ==
- Introducing Tierney Sutton (A Records, 1997)
- Unsung Heroes (Telarc, 2000)
- Blue in Green (Telarc, 2001)
- Something Cool (Telarc, 2002)
- Dancing in the Dark (Telarc, 2004)
- I'm with the Band (Telarc, 2005)
- On the Other Side (Telarc, 2007)
- Desire (Telarc, 2009)
- American Road (BFM Jazz, 2011)
- After Blue (BFM Jazz, 2013)
- Paris Sessions (BFM Jazz, 2014)
- The Sting Variations (BFM Jazz, 2016)
- Sully movie soundtrack, with Clint Eastwood (Varese Sarabande, 2016)
- Screen Play (BFM Jazz, 2019)
- The Paris Sessions 2 (BFM Jazz, May 6, 2022)

=== Grammy nominations ===
Year	Nominated work	Award	Result
2006	I'm with the Band	Best Jazz Vocal Album	Nominated
2008	On the Other Side	Best Jazz Vocal Album	Nominated
2010	Desire	Best Jazz Vocal Album	Nominated
2012	American Road	Best Jazz Vocal Album	Nominated
2012	On Broadway	Best Instrumental Arrangement Accompanying Vocalist(s)	Nominated
2014	After Blue	Best Jazz Vocal Album	Nominated
2015	Paris Sessions	Best Jazz Vocal Album	Nominated
2017	The Sting Variations	Best Jazz Vocal Album	Nominated
2019	ScreenPlay	Best Jazz Vocal Album	Nominated
