= Blue Rose (band) =

Bluegrass band

Blue Rose was an all-star all-women band that played bluegrass music. All of the musicians in the group are solo artists in their own right who joined to record an album as a group in 1988 for Sugar Hill Records.

- Cathy Fink: vocals, guitar, banjo, dulcimer
- Laurie Lewis: vocals, fiddle, guitar, bowed bass
- Marcy Marxer: vocals, guitar, mandolin
- Molly Mason: vocals, bass
- Sally Van Meter: vocals, Dobro, lap steel

The 1988 album's title was simply the name of the band (Blue Rose).
