= Superstratum (album) =

Studio album by John Burke
- Released: 2017
- Recorded: 2017
- Genre: Instrumental Music
- Length: 53:39
- Label: Independent

John Burke chronology
Orogen (2016)	Superstratum (2017)

Superstratum is an instrumental album composed and arranged by American pianist John Burke. The album was inspired by the layers of Earth and its atmosphere. A self-released title, Superstratum is Burke's first multi-instrumental album. Consisting of all Atlanta-based musicians, the album features piano by Burke, violins by Kevin Chaney, guitar by David Deveaux, percussion by Schafer Gray, cello by Noah Johnson, clarinet by Corinne Klemenc, and flute by Erin Wallace.

== Track listing ==
No.	Title	Length
1.	"Core"	4:14
2.	"Mantle"	4:56
3.	"Sea"	5:37
4.	"Earth"	5:19
5.	"Storm"	5:58
6.	"Flight"	5:22
7.	"Burn"	4:50
8.	"Aurora"	5:30
9.	"Rift"	8:11
10.	"Boundless"	3:42
