= Big Virginia Sky =

Americana band

- Origin: Hampton Roads, Virginia, United States
- Genres: Americana, alt country, bluegrass, folk
- Years active: 2012-present
- Labels: Independent
- Members: James Adkins, Scott Slay, Sammy Shelor, Brandon Bostic (touring), Steve Lazar, Dale Lazar
- Website: www.bigvirginiasky.com

Bluegrass-inspired Americana group Big Virginia Sky was founded in late 2012 and features original music with cameos from Sierra Hull, violinist Tim Crouch, and vocalist/producer Randy Kohrs, Big Virginia Sky independently released their first self-titled album in late September, 2015. The group is described as playing a mix of Americana and traditional instrumental tunes. When playing Bluegrass music, the group uses a full drum-kit and other world percussion, which is often frowned upon by enthusiasts as it is a non-traditional method. The group’s debut album was released in Fall, 2015 after a successful crowdfunding campaign. The album features original songs written by the band as well as those co-written with singer-songwriters such as Tanya Gallagher (Love Song) and Logan Vath (Whiskey and Long Talks). The album release concert tour was sponsored by The Vinyl Music Hall in Pensacola, FL and listed on Bluegrass Unlimited.

Big Virginia Sky features singer-songwriter and lead vocalist, Cole Clark-sponsored guitar player, James Adkins, with an addition from award-winning vocalist and mandolin player, Scott Slay. Co-founding member, Sammy Shelor, is a 5-time IBMA Banjo Player of the Year, Steve Martin Award recipient, Virginia Music Hall of Fame recipient and frontman of Lonesome River Band.

== Current members ==
- James Adkins (vocals, guitar, songwriter)
- Scott Slay (vocals, mandolin, songwriter)
- Sammy Shelor (banjo, telecaster, vocals)
- Brandon Bostic (telecaster, dobro, slide guitar, vocals) (added in 2016)
- Steve Lazar (bass, vocals)
- Dale Lazar (drums, percussion)

== Endorsements ==
Frontman James Adkins is currently sponsored by Australian guitar company Cole Clark, and the group is endorsed by D'Addario.

== Discography ==
=== Studio albums ===
- Big Virginia Sky (2015)

== Album reception ==
Brett Stewart, a music blogger, recently remarked, “The album is absolutely terrific – well performed, well written, and always fun. It’s an experience you need to immerse yourself in if you have any appreciation for country, bluegrass, blues, or Americana in general.” In an AltDaily.com review, music columnist remarked, "Guest appearances aside, Shelor and Slay are truly the stars on the record, trading brilliant solos on almost every song, including two excellent instrumentals. Shelor’s banjo work on “Bullfrog” in particular is reminiscent of old-school Béla Fleck."

== IBMA ==
Big Virginia Sky was selected as one of the International Bluegrass Music Association (IBMA)'s featured showcase artists in 2015 to play during the conference in addition to their performance during a Virginia Tourism event with The Church Sisters and Lonesome River Band. The group was featured in the Raleigh News & Observer for their performance.
