= Tanya Gallagher =

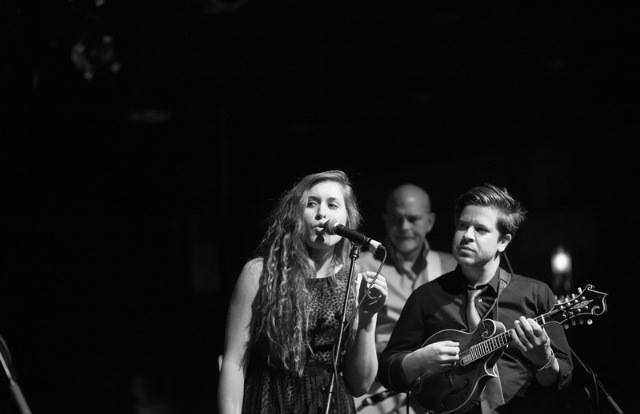
- Gallagher performing with Big Virginia Sky

Background information
- Genres: Acoustic; indie folk
- Occupation(s): Singer, songwriter, scientist
- Instrument(s): Vocals, guitar, piano
- Years active: 2006–present
- Labels: Head Above Water

Tanya Gallagher is an American indie folk singer-songwriter from Pensacola, Florida.

== Career ==
Gallagher released her first solo album, Oh My Love, in 2013. In 2016, she released her second solo album, Virginia.

In July 2019, Gallagher released a six-track EP, One Hand on my Heart. The album was produced by Daniel Mendez of Head Above Water Music at Matchbox Studios in Austin, Texas.

In January 2024, Gallagher took over hosting of Pensacola radio station WUWF's monthly concert series RadioLive.

== Discography ==
- It's Been So Long (Baylen, 2007)
- Oh My Love (Solo Album, 2013)
- Virginia (Solo Album, 2016)
- One Hand on my Heart (Solo EP, 2019)
