= Tim Bowman Jr. =

American gospel musician (born 1987)

- Born: Timothy Bowman Jr. May 26, 1987 (age 39); Detroit, Michigan
- Genres: Gospel, urban contemporary gospel
- Occupations: Singer, songwriter
- Instruments: Vocals, singer-songwriter, guitar
- Years active: 2012–present
- Label: Lifestyle Music Group/Capitol
- Website: timbowmanjr.com

Timothy Bowman Jr. (born May 26, 1987) is an American gospel musician. He started his music career in 2012 with the release of Beautiful by Trippin 'N' Rhythm Records. This album was his breakthrough release upon the Billboard magazine Gospel Albums and Independent Albums charts. The song "He Will", featuring Vickie Winans, his paternal aunt, charted on the Billboard magazine Hot Gospel Songs chart. He is a Grammy, Dove, and Stellar Award nominated artist. His critically acclaimed album "Listen" debuted at No. 1 on Billboard Gospel Albums, and garnered 2 No. 1 singles off the project "I’m Good" and "Fix Me”

== Early life ==
Bowman was born on May 26, 1987, in the City of Detroit, Michigan. His father is noted smooth jazz guitarist Tim Bowman, and his aunt is gospel recording artist Vickie Winans. He majored in pharmaceutical sciences while going to Wayne State University.

== Music career ==
His music recording career commenced in 2012 with the album Beautiful, released by Trippin 'N' Rhythm Records. This album was his breakthrough release upon the Billboard magazine charts, which placed it at No. 8 on the Gospel Albums and No. 50 on the Independent Albums charts. The song "He Will", featuring aunt Vickie Winans, placed a No. 19 on the Billboard magazine Hot Gospel Albums chart.

== Personal life ==
Bowman Jr. proposed to his girlfriend, Brelyn Freeman, on December 25, 2014, while his family was celebrating Christmas in Michigan. The couple married on October 10, 2015 in Upper Marlboro, Maryland. On Sunday, August 19, 2018, he and his wife were ordained as the Music Pastor and Millennial Pastor at the Spirit of Faith Christian Center under Apostle Mike and Dr. DeeDee Freeman. Bowman Jr started a tradition in 2019; every February he & Faith Music and a guest gospel singer sing tributes to different black gospel artists every week in February for Black History Month.

== Discography ==
List of selected studio albums, with selected chart positions
Title	Album details	Peak chart positions		Sales
Title	Album details	US Gos	US Ind	Sales
Beautiful	Released: April 10, 2012; Label: Trippin 'N' Rhythm; CD, digital download	8	50	US:
Listen	Released: May 6, 2016; Lifestyle Music Group/Motown Gospel; CD, digital download	1	—	

=== Singles ===
Year	Single	Chart Positions
Year	Single	Gospel Songs
2010	"He Will"	19
2012	"Have Yourself A Merry Little Christmas"	—
2015	"I'm Good"	1
