= Bloodline (Kenny Neal album) =

Studio album by Kenny Neal
- Released: 2016
- Genre: Blues

Bloodline is an album by Kenny Neal. It earned Neal a Grammy Award nomination for Best Contemporary Blues Album.
