= The Hazel and Alice Sessions =

Studio album by Laurie Lewis and the Right Hands
- Released: 2016
- Genre: Bluegrass
- Label: Spruce and Maple

Laurie Lewis chronology
One Evening in May (2013)	The Hazel and Alice Sessions (2016)

The Hazel and Alice Sessions is an album by Laurie Lewis and the Right Hands. It earned the artists a Grammy Award nomination for Best Bluegrass Album.
