= Weighted Mind =

Studio album by Sierra Hull
- Released: January 29, 2016
- Genre: Bluegrass, folk, country
- Length: 43:42
- Label: Rounder
- Producer: Béla Fleck

Sierra Hull chronology
Daybreak (2011)	Weighted Mind (2016)

Weighted Mind is a country and bluegrass album by Sierra Hull. It earned her a Grammy Award nomination for Best Folk Album in December 2016. The spartan arrangements center on Hull's vocals and mandolin accompanied by Ethan Jodziewicz on double bass, with occasional backing vocals by Alison Krauss, Abigail Washburn, and Rhiannon Giddens. The album was produced by Béla Fleck.

== Track listing ==
All tracks are written by Sierra Hull, except where noted.

No.	Title	Length
1.	"Stranded"	2:08
2.	"Compass" (Zach Bevill/Sierra Hull)	2:37
3.	"Choices and Changes" (Sierra Hull/Jon Weisberger)	3:19
4.	"Wings of the Dawn"	4:23
5.	"Birthday"	4:01
6.	"Weighted Mind" (Zach Bevill/Sierra Hull)	3:45
7.	"Fallen Man" (Sierra Hull/Josh Shilling)	2:24
8.	"The In-between" (Sierra Hull/Jon Weisberger)	5:12
9.	"Lullaby"	3:33
10.	"Queen of Hearts/Royal Tea" (Traditional)	4:43
11.	"I'll Be Fine"	3:46
12.	"Black River"	3:51

== Personnel ==
- Sierra Hull – mandolin, vocals
- Ethan Jodziewicz – double bass
- Alison Krauss – backing vocals
- Abigail Washburn – backing vocals
- Rhiannon Giddens – backing vocals
- Béla Fleck – engineer, producer
- Richard Battaglia – engineer
- Richard Dodd – mastering
