= Mallet Quartet =

2009 composition by Steve Reich

Mallet Quartet is a composition by Steve Reich scored for two marimbas and two vibraphones, or for four marimbas. It was co-commissioned by the Amadinda Quartet in Budapest, on the occasion of its 25th anniversary, by Nexus in Toronto, So Percussion in New York, and Synergy Percussion in Australia. It received its world premiere on December 6, 2009, at the Bela Bartók National Concert Hall in Hungary and its US premiere at Stanford University on January 9, 2010.

== Structure ==
Mallet Quartet is in three movements, with its entirety lasting around 14 minutes:

1. Fast
2. Slow
3. Fast

The second movement is one of his most thinly textured works with acoustic instrumentation, as admitted by Reich himself.

== Performance ==
The piece can either be played with two marimbas and two vibraphones, or with four marimbas.
