= Laurie Lewis =

American musician (born 1950)

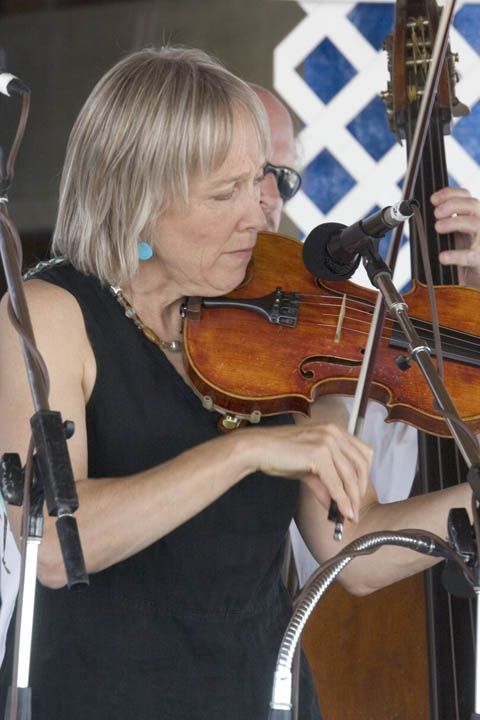
- Lewis at the Delaware Valley Bluegrass Festival; September 3, 2005

Background information
- Born: September 28, 1950 (age 74)
- Origin: Long Beach, California, United States
- Genres: Folk, Bluegrass, Country
- Occupation: singer/musician
- Instruments: vocals; fiddle; guitar; upright bass
- Years active: mid '70s—present
- Labels: HighTone; Flying Fish; Rounder; Signature Sounds; Spruce & Marple
- Website: Official Website

Laurie Alexis Lewis (born September 28, 1950) is an American bluegrass singer, musician, and songwriter.

== History ==
Laurie Lewis was born in Long Beach, California on September 28, 1950. Her family moved regularly from place to place until she was eight years old, when they settled back in Berkeley. Her family strongly encouraged Laurie and all her siblings to play music. She started on piano and violin until a friend took her to the Berkeley Folk Festival where she first caught the folk bug:

Oh, it was so exciting. Every night there were concerts, and during the day you'd be in a eucalyptus grove listening to someone making music with nothing between you and them. Every day I'd hear something new, Doc Watson or the Greenbriar Boys. Something about it just invited me to start playing it.

She began picking simple songs on the guitar, then the fiddle. After high school, she drifted away from the music, but always kept her fiddle under her bed, not knowing exactly why.

In her early 20s, she discovered the Bay Area bluegrass scene. To her, it was . .

like opening that door all over again. Here were all these people making music together, and I could immediately see myself as part of it. It woke up all that excitement I felt as a teenager, and I knew this was what I wanted to do with my life.

The bluegrass scene of Northern California was a powerful mix of the region's historic progressivism and ardent devotion to musical tradition. Nobody minded that young Laurie was a woman, a non-southerner, or a novice. They didn't mind if she didn't want to learn, chapter and verse, the gospels of Bill Monroe and Ralph Stanley. The scene gave her a rock-ribbed foundation in the rudiments of American roots music.

It really was a different deal coming to bluegrass in the San Francisco Bay area. There weren't a lot of cutting contests; it was all about making music together, a focus on interdependency rather than individual prowess.

In the early 1970s she played with The Phantoms of the Opry, a Bay Area bluegrass band that also included Pat Enright (later of the Nashville Bluegrass Band). When the Phantoms broke up she co-founded the Good Ol' Persons, an all-female bluegrass band with Kathy Kallick. In 1979 she founded the Grant Street String Band, also including Beth Weil, Tom Bekeny, Greg Townsend, and Steve Krouse, in which her own songwriting came to the forefront. In the late 1980s, she formed "Laurie Lewis and Grant Street". Since then, she has recorded solo and duo albums, usually accompanied by mandolin artist and singer, Tom Rozum. Nowadays, she often plays under different names with a fairly regular roster of musicians, calling themselves "Laurie Lewis and her Bluegrass Pals," "the Guest House Band;" in 2006, she renamed her group "Laurie Lewis and the Right Hands."

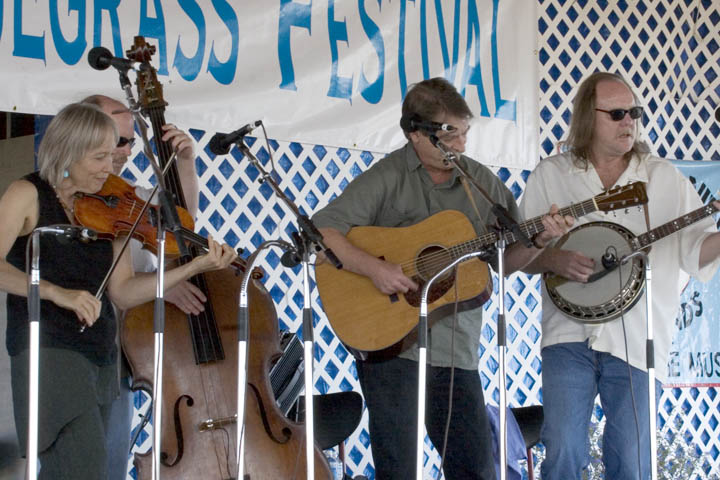
Laurie Lewis with band at the Delaware Valley Bluegrass Festival, September 3, 2005. Image by Jan1020

Many years ago, Lewis twice won California's Women's Fiddling championships. She is a versatile musician, having for many years played bass and sung with Dick Oxtot's Golden Age Jazz Band, as well as with the Bay Area band the Arkansas Sheiks. Lewis plays guitar and other string instruments. As a crossover artist, Lewis is comfortable with folk music and some pop music. She writes her own lyrics as well as composing the music. Her Songbook contains most of the songs she wrote in the twentieth century, as well as photographs from her from early life and the early days of her career. She has received a Grammy, and was previously nominated for that honor.

== Style and sound ==
In addition to being well known in the bluegrass world, Laurie has crossed many boundaries and played many genres, from bluegrass to folk and Americana. While she has always been firmly grounded in the traditional roots music of America, the nuances she brings to the table have helped her branch out, even bringing the sound of California bluegrass to a wider audience and receiving recognition for it from her musical peers.

"She is newgrass in the truest sense of the word, in that she uses bluegrass instruments to create new original music: it's music for now. As a fiddler, she could be from the 1940s or from 2010; it's timeless. As a singer, she knows the rules of bluegrass and how to sing in her own voice. She's probably one of the few female singers who really knows the nuances of the Ralph Stanley."

-Sam Bush (Newgrass Revival founder and mandolin player)

"To ask how Laurie Lewis's music is relevant in this day and age, in the broader folk, Americana, and bluegrass scenes as a whole, would be similar to asking how a brick in a home's foundation is relevant to its structure. Her influence, her reach and her artistic intent are quiet stalwarts on which so much has been built."

-Justin Hiltner, Bluegrass Situation

== Recordings and performance ==
Lewis, accompanied by Tom Rozum, has appeared at the Grand Ole Opry and several times with Garrison Keillor on A Prairie Home Companion. She was the program director for a music camp on the Oregon Coast called Bluegrass at the Beach which she has done with Tom Rozum, from 1992 until 2005. She was the director of Bluegrass Week at the Augusta Heritage Arts Workshops for 10 years, from 1986 until 1996.

Lewis's songs have been recorded by others, including Kathy Mattea, and she has accompanied Holly Near. She has been invited to accompany many other artists, including Kato Sanden, Linda Ronstadt, and Ralph Stanley. Besides producing her own CDs, Lewis's skill in the recording studio has resulted in her being asked to produce recordings for a number of other artists, including Scott Nygaard, Erica Wheeler, The T Sisters, Alice Gerrard, American Nomad, Melody Walker and Jacob Groopman, Ray Bierl, and Diedre McCalla. She is also in demand as a teacher on fiddle and guitar, vocals, and songwriting.

Lewis has toured widely in many parts of the world, including most European countries, China, and Japan. When not on tour, she makes her home in Berkeley, California.

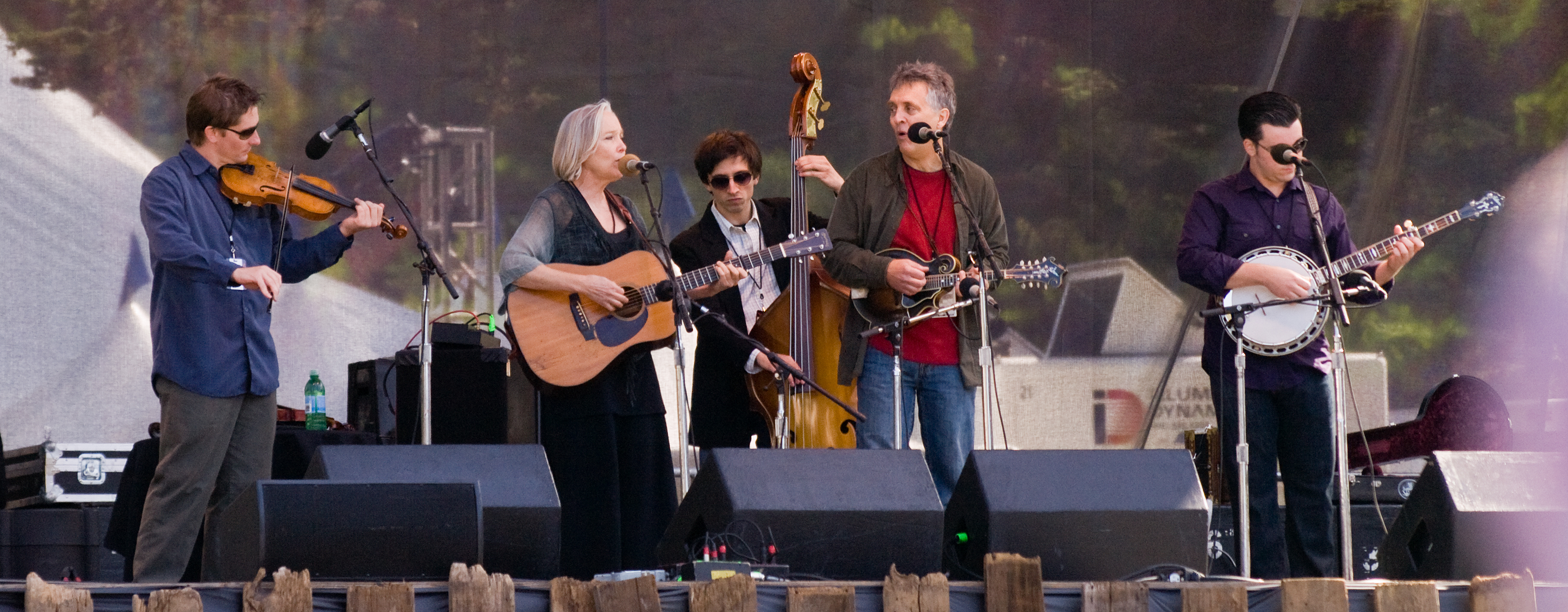
With the Right Hands at the Hardly Strictly Bluegrass Festival in October 2009.

== Personnel ==
Laurie Lewis and the Right Hands comprises:

- Laurie Lewis: Fiddle, Guitar, Vocals
- Brandon Godman: fiddle
- George Guthrie: banjo
- Haselden Ciaccio: string bass

== Distinctions and awards ==
- Laurie Lewis twice won California's Women's Fiddling championships.
- Song of the Year at IBMA in 1994 for "Who Will Watch the Home Place
- Contributed fiddle and vocal performances for True Life Blues: The Songs of Bill Monroe that won a Grammy in 1997 for Best Bluegrass Album. Todd Phillips (musician) is credited for winning the award as producer of the album.
- She was nominated with Tom Rozum for a GRAMMY for their collection of duets, The Oak and the Laurel, in the category of Best Traditional Folk Album of 1995.
- Twice named Female Vocalist of the Year at the International Bluegrass Music Awards, in 1992 and 1994.
- Nominated for a GRAMMY for The Hazel and Alice Sessions, a collection of songs celebrating Hazel Dickens and Alice Gerrard, in 2017.
- She received the Collaborative Recording of the Year award three times: 1997, 2001, and 2020. In 1997 for True Life Blues: The Songs of Bill Monroe, in 2001 for Follow me Back to the Fold: A Tribute to Women in Bluegrass, and in 2020 for "The Barber's Fiddle", which she recorded alongside Becky Buller and a range of other artists.

Judging by the respect she has among fans and peers in the industry, Laurie is one of the pre-eminent bluegrass and Americana artists of our time. She spreads her talent over several genres - bluegrass, folk, country - and with the recognition she has within all those fields, I would certainly say she's one of the top five female artists of the last 30 years. And she continues to make great music.

— Dan Hays, Executive Director, IBMA

== Discography ==
- Grant Street String Band (1983)
- Restless Rambling Heart (1986)
- Blue Rose with Blue Rose: Cathy Fink & Marcy Marxer, Molly Mason, and Sally Van Meter (1989)
- Love Chooses You (1989)
- Singin' My Troubles Away with Grant Street Band (1991) Flying Fish Records — ASIN: B000000MOQ
- True Stories (1993) Rounder / Umgd — ASIN: B0000002L5
- Together with Kathy Kallick (1995) Rounder Select — ASIN: B0000002M1
- The Oak and the Laurel with Tom Rozum (1995) Rounder / Umgd — ASIN: B0000002N6
- Earth & Sky: Songs of Laurie Lewis (1997) Rounder / Umgd — ASIN: B0000002PL
- Seeing Things (1998)
- Laurie Lewis and Her Bluegrass Pals (1999) Rounder / Umgd — ASIN: B00000IP88
- Winter's Grace with Tom Rozum (2003)
- Birdsong
- Guest House with Tom Rozum (2004) Hightone Records — ASIN: B0001LJCQ6
- The Golden West with The Right Hands (2006) Hightone Records — ASIN: B000H5V8T0
- Live - with The Right Hands (2008) Spruce & Maple
- Blossoms (2010) Spruce & Maple
- Skippin' and Flyin' (2011) Spruce & Maple Music
- One Evening in May (2013) Spruce and Maple Music
- Laurie & Kathy Sing the Songs of Vern & Ray (2014) Spruce and Maple Music (with Kathy Kallick)
- The Hazel and Alice Sessions (2016)
- and Laurie Lewis (2020)
- Freight '98 (2022)
- Trees (2024)

== See also ==
- Tim O'Brien (musician)
- Bluegrass music
- American folk music
- Violin
- Long Beach, California
- Grammy Awards
- Tom Rozum
- Hightone Records
