= John Burke (American pianist) =

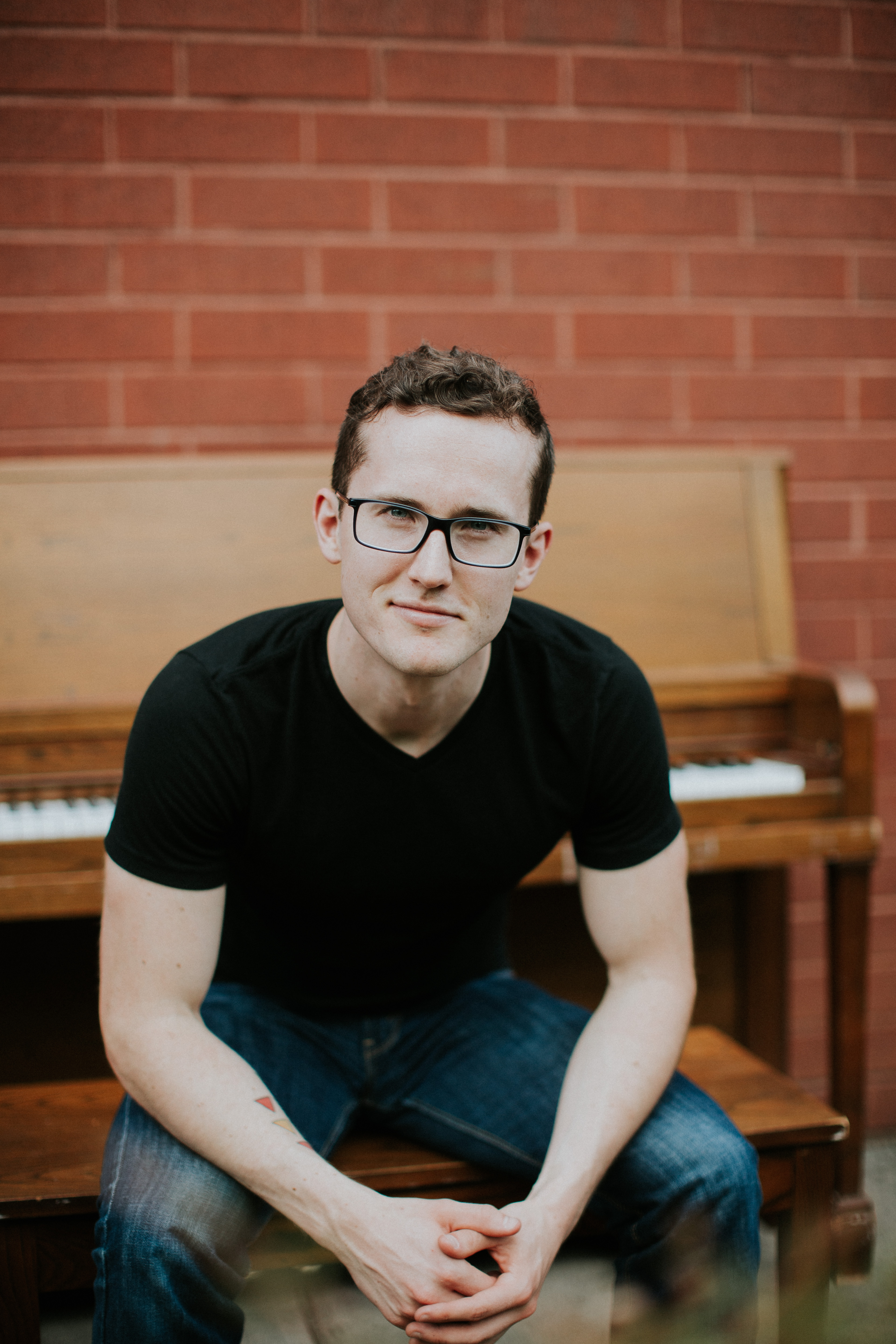

Background information
- Born: 1988 (age 37–38)
- Origin: Atlanta, Georgia, U.S.
- Genres: New-age music, Jazz, Film score
- Occupation: Musician
- Instrument: Piano
- Years active: 2011–present
- Label: Independent
- Website: johnburkemusic.com

John Burke (born 1988) is an American pianist, composer, and songwriter based in Atlanta, Georgia. Burke is best known for his solo piano albums. He has also composed scores for film, video games, and theatre.

== Background ==
Burke was born and raised in Atlanta, Georgia, where he studied Spanish and music at Oglethorpe University. He later studied public administration at Georgia State University. While in school, Burke discovered pianist George Winston and keyboardist Ray Manzarek and was inspired to become a pianist and composer.

== Solo piano albums ==
In 2011 Burke released his first solo piano album, Synesthesia, which used the neurological phenomenon of the same name to guide compositions based on colors. The album was reviewed positively on English and Spanish music review websites and received international radio play.

In 2013 Burke released his second album, Reverie, which was nominated for Jazz Album of the Year at the solo piano music review site SoloPiano.com. Reverie too received international play and review.

In 2014 Burke released Chirality at a concert, the recording of which received a Telly Award. After winning Jazz Album of the Year, Chirality became a finalist for Album of the Year at SoloPiano.com. In an homage to Johann Sebastian Bach, Chirality used the chemical property of asymmetry as inspiration for melodies and mirrored countermelodies.

In 2016 Burke released Orogen at a concert. The album used the formation of mountains as inspiration for the gradual growth of a single melody. A completely self-released album, Orogen was nominated for Best New Age Album for the 59th Annual Grammy Awards.

In 2021 Burke released Bright Eyes, which he dedicated to his son.

== Other albums ==
In 2015 Burke released his first collaborative album, Kairos, at a concert at Oglethorpe University. The album blended piano with spoken word and flute by Sandra Hughes, the co-founder of Gateway Performance Productions in Atlanta, GA.

In 2017 Burke released his first multi-instrumental album, Superstratum, at a concert at Eddie's Attic in Decatur, Georgia. Each composition of Superstratum represents a layer of the earth and its atmosphere.

In 2018 Burke released his first winter album, The Longest Night. The album featured Burke's instrumental arrangements of popular holiday tunes as well as original compositions.

In 2020 Burke released Sons of Kronos for string quintet. Each piece was named after Poseidon, Hades, and Zeus, the three sons of the mythological titan, Kronos.

== Film music ==
In 2013 Burke composed the original score for the film Juvenile Transgressions.

In 2013 Burke's original piano music was featured on the documentary Going Home.

In 2015 Burke composed the original score for the film Shattered Reflections, starring Lance Broadway.

== Stage music ==
In 2015 Burke composed an original solo piano score for Serenbe Playhouse's production of Tennessee Williams's A Streetcar Named Desire, starring The Vampire Diaries' Matthew Davis.

In 2017 Burke composed the original score for Synchronicity Theatre's production of Katherine Applegate's The One and Only Ivan, adapted for stage by James E. Grote.

In 2017 Burke composed the original score for Serenbe Playhouse's production of Robin Hood, adapted by playwright Rachel Teagle and directed by Broadway actor Paul McGill. That same season, Burke composed the original score for the Playhouse's production of Macbeth, starring Drop Dead Diva's Justin Deeley.

In 2018 Burke wrote music and lyrics for Red: A Crayon's Musical with author Ben Thorpe, who wrote the musical's book. The musical was an original work based on the children's book Red: A Crayon's Story by Michael Hall. Red: A Crayon's Musical debuted on August 7, 2018 at the Atlanta Musical Theatre Festival.

== Video game music ==
In 2019 Burke composed the original score for Sci-Ops: Global Defense, an edutainment game for PC created by Plasma Games.

== Discography ==
- 2011 Synesthesia
- 2013 Reverie
- 2014 Chirality
- 2015 Kairos
- 2015 A Streetcar Named Desire (Original Soundtrack)
- 2016 Orogen
- 2017 Superstratum
- 2018 The Longest Night
- 2019 Sci-Ops: Global Defense (Original Soundtrack)
- 2020 Sons of Kronos
- 2021 Bright Eyes
