= Listen (Tim Bowman Jr. album) =

Studio album by Tim Bowman Jr.
- Released: May 6, 2016
- Genre: Gospel
- Label: Lifestyle Music Group/Capitol
- Producer: Rodney Jerkins

Tim Bowman Jr. chronology
Beautiful (2012)	Listen (2016)

Listen is an album by Tim Bowman Jr., released on May 6, 2016. It reached a peak position of number one on Billboard's Top Gospel Albums chart, and earned Bowman a Grammy Award nomination for Best Gospel Album.

== Track listing ==
1. "Listen (Morning)" - 0:48
2. "Everybody Needs Love" (feat. BrvndoP) – 4:11
3. "Always on Time" – 3:13
4. "I'm Good" – 3:44
5. "Strength" – 3:41
6. "Back to You" – 3:53
7. "Listen (Evening)" – 0:43
8. "Your Love" – 4:55
9. "Always" – 4:34
10. "Home" – 3:38
11. "Without You" – 4:12
12. "Better" – 4:04
13. "I Won" – 3:41
14. "Fix Me" – 4:40
15. "Good Good Father" – 5:42

Track listing adapted from iTunes.
