= Tom Rozum =

American singer

Tom Rozum (born January 21, 1951, in Connecticut) is a Northern California-based American bluegrass mandolinist and singer. He is best known for his long-time collaboration with partner Laurie Lewis.

== Music career ==
Originally from New England, Rozum moved to Berkeley from Arizona, where he played many kinds of traditional and original music with Summerdog and Flying South; and San Diego with the Rhythm Rascals. In 1986, he joined forces with Laurie Lewis as part of the original Grant Street Band. He plays primarily mandolin, but is also an accomplished fiddle, mandola, and guitar player. Rozum was part of the staff of Bluegrass at the Beach, a music camp on the Oregon Coast led by Laurie Lewis from 1992 to 2007.

A long-time fixture on the Bay Area music scene, Rozum is best known for "The Oak and the Laurel," his 1996 Grammy-nominated album of duets with Laurie Lewis. Rozum has also released a solo album "Jubilee" wherein he covers little-known country music by Merle Haggard, The Louvin Brothers and Bill Monroe interwoven with contemporary songs by David Olney and Mark Simos, among others.
