= Martin Kuuskmann =

Estonian bassoonist (born 1971)

- Born: Martin Kuuskmann; 21 April 1971 (age 55); Tallinn, then part of Estonian SSR, Soviet Union
- Genres: Classical, contemporary classical music, modern music
- Occupations: Musician, recording artist, educator
- Instrument: Bassoon
- Years active: 1994–

Martin Kuuskmann (born 21 April 1971) is a 3-time Grammy nominated Estonian-American virtuoso bassoonist. Noted for his performances and recordings spanning an extraordinarily wide range of styles, he has performed with many of the world’s leading orchestras and conductors.

== Biography ==
Kuuskmann was born in Tallinn, Estonia (then under Soviet Union occupation). He studied bassoon in Tallinn Music High School, Manhattan School of Music and Yale School of Music. His mentors include Stephen Maxym, Frank Morelli, Rufus Olivier, Vernon Read and Ilmar Aasmets.

He is currently a bassoon professor at the Lamont School of Music at University of Denver, he has taught at the Manhattan School of Music (2007-2016) and at the Mannes School of Music Preparatory School (1997-2003) in New York City. Martin Kuuskmann lives in the Denver area with his wife and their three children.

== Discography ==
- The Path of Mantra (with Peeter Vähi and Drikung Kagyu monks), 2002 Erdenklang, 21902
- Nonstop (with Kristjan Randalu), 2010 Estonian Record Productions, 2209 ERP
- Bassoon Concertos (with Tallinn Chamber Orchestra and Risto Joost), 2015 Estonian Record Productions, ERP 8215
