= The Sting Variations =

Studio album by The Tierney Sutton Band
- Released: September 9, 2016
- Recorded: May 2016
- Studio: LAFX Recording Services, The Doghouse Studio
- Genre: Jazz
- Length: 67:00
- Label: BFM
- Producer: Trey Henry

Tierney Sutton chronology
Paris Sessions (2014)	The Sting Variations (2016)

The Sting Variations is an album by The Tierney Sutton Band. It earned the group a Grammy Award nomination for Best Jazz Vocal Album.

== Track listing ==
All tracks are written by Sting except where noted.

No.	Title	Length
1.	"Driven to Tears"	5:47
2.	"If You Love Somebody Set Them Free"	5:53
3.	"Seven Days"	6:17
4.	"Shadows in the Rain"	4:37
5.	"Walking in Your Footsteps"	3:50
6.	"Fragile/Gentle Rain" (Sting/Luiz Bonfá/Matt Dubey)	4:37
7.	"Message in a Bottle"	4:27
8.	"Fields of Gold"	4:45
9.	"Fortress Around Your Heart"	4:04
10.	"Language of Birds" (Sting/Rob Mathes)	5:09
11.	"Every Little Thing He Does Is Magic"	3:02
12.	"Every Breath You Take"	4:46
13.	"Synchronicity I"	4:11
14.	"Consider Me Gone"	5:35

== Personnel ==
- Tierney Sutton – vocals
- Christian Jacob – piano
- Ray Brinker – drums, percussion
- Kevin Axt – double bass
- Trey Henry – double bass, bass guitar, arranger, producer
- Zackary Darling – engineer, mixing
- Michael Aarvold– mastering, mixing
