= Christian Jacob (musician) =

French jazz pianist

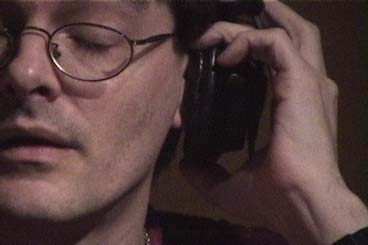
- Recording "Time Lines", 1998

Background information
- Born: 8 May 1958 (age 67); Metz, Lorraine, France
- Genres: Jazz
- Occupations: Musician, composer, arranger
- Instrument: Piano
- Years active: 1980s–present
- Labels: Concord, WilderJazz, BFM Jazz, SSJ Japan
- Website: christianjacob.com

Christian Jacob is a French jazz pianist. He has gained widespread exposure as co-leader, arranger and pianist with vocalist Tierney Sutton, although he has also maintained a substantial career as a solo artist and leader.

== Early years ==
Jacob was born in Metz, Lorraine on 8 May 1958. A pianist by age four, he was immersed in studying the French classics. Something of a child prodigy, Jacob had perfect pitch and natural talent. He did not discover jazz until age 10, but when he did, its improvised nature appealed to him immediately. Early influences were Dave Brubeck and Oscar Peterson. As a teen, Jacob studied under Pierre Sancan at the Conservatoire National Superieur de Musique in Paris. Later, he would teach piano at the Conservatoire National de Region in Metz.

In January 1983, Jacob entered Berklee College of Music in Boston, Massachusetts, and won many awards as a student, including the Joe Zawinul Jazz Masters Award, Oscar Peterson Jazz Masters Award, and Down Beat "Top Collegiate Jazz Soloist" before graduating magna cum laude in 1985. Jacob then took a teaching position at Berklee.

During his years in Boston, he formed "Bostonian Friends", a musical partnership with Swiss saxophonist Fritz Renold, which produced jazz recordings ("Starlight" 1996) and classical commissions ("The 6 Cycles" with the Thai Symphony Orchestra 1999, and "Helvetic Suite" 1998). Although having renounced the classical performing circuit for jazz, Jacob has maintained ties with the classical world through projects such as these commissioned works. Renold introduced Jacob to the Swiss Youth Jazz Orchestra, for which he was an arranger and educator throughout the 1990s. From 1992 to 1994, Jacob also served as Director in Residence of the "Orchestre Regional Jazz de Lorraine" in Nancy, Meurthe-et-Moselle, and composed their inaugural commission.

== Career ==
=== Professional years ===
While still at Berklee, Jacob worked with vibraphonist Gary Burton, but left Boston to tour with Maynard Ferguson through 1992. Jacob served as performer, writer, and arranger with Ferguson's band. This led to Ferguson producing Jacob's first piano trio record, featuring John Patitucci and Peter Erskine. Sidemen for his follow-up trio project "Time Lines" were Steve Swallow and Adam Nussbaum. Jacob developed material with a third trio featuring Miroslav Vitouš and Bill Stewart. The first two recordings were released on Concord Records, but the later is yet to be released.

Jacob has extensive credits as a sideman, including Phil Woods, Michael Brecker, Randy Brecker, Flora Purim, Airto Moreira, Terje Gewelt, Carl Saunders and others, but his most visible association has been as co-leader and pianist for Telarc recording artist Tierney Sutton.

=== The Tierney Sutton Band ===
Initially Jacob was hired to perform on one recording with Tierney, but the group bonded musically and gave up their leader/sidemen statuses. Sutton, Trey Henry, Ray Brinker, Kevin Axt and Jacob became co-leaders of The Tierney Sutton Band. As co-leaders, they recorded eight CDs. Unsung Heroes, Blue in Green, Something Cool, Dancing in the Dark, I'm with the Band, On the Other Side, Desire and American Road. The latter four were each nominated for a Grammy Award. In 2012 Christian and The Tierney Sutton Band received two Grammy nominations for American Road, Best Jazz Vocal Album and Best Arrangement Accompanying a Vocalist.

=== The Christian Jacob Trio ===
Jacob released three trio recordings on his own independent label WilderJazz. The 2004 release, Styne & Mine, is a tribute to the music of Jule Styne, and reached No. 3 in the jazz radio charts. The trio then recorded Contradictions in 2006. The recording pays homage and offers another look at the original compositions of pianist Michel Petrucciani. Jacob's next trio recording was a joint venture with Japanese label SSJ, titled Live in Japan. It was recorded live at Tokyo Tuc Jazz Club in 2008.

=== Musical director for Betty Buckley ===
In 2011 Jacob became music director for the Broadway singer Betty Buckley. His introduction to her world of Broadway was a week of sold out performances at Feinstein's nightclub in New York. Musically it was a perfect fit. He was happy to reunite with an aspect of classical music. At the end of 2011 they brought the show into the recording studio. Ah, Men! The Boys of Broadway will be released in August 2012 by Palmetto Records.

His arranging credits include writing for Randy Brecker, Franco Ambrosetti, Benny Golson, Gary Burton, Tommy Smith and The Scottish National Jazz Orchestra, Jazzaar (The Swiss Youth Jazz Orchestra) and his own big band "Big Band Theory".

== Awards ==
- Down Beat Magazine Top Collegiate Jazz Soloist 1986
- 3-time Grammy nominee for Best Vocal Jazz Album
- Grammy nominee 2011 Best Arrangement Accompanying Vocalist
- Oscar Peterson Jazz Masters Award
- Winner of the 6th annual Great American Jazz Piano Competition at the Jacksonville Jazz Festival

== Discography ==
=== As leader/co-leader ===
Year recorded	Title	Label	Notes
2019?	The Originals	WilderJazz	The Christian Jacob Trio, leader
2019?	Screenplay	Bfm Jazz	The Tierney Sutton Band, co-leader
2018?	Hope	PALMETTO+	Betty Buckley, pianist, MD
2017?	Story Songs	PALMETTO+	Betty Buckley, pianist, MD, arranger
2016?	Sully movie soundtrack	Varese Sarabande	Clint Eastwood, Christian Jacob, The Tierney Sutton Band
2016?	The Sting Variations	BFM	The Tierney Sutton Band, co-leader
2014?	Beautiful Jazz: A Private Concert	WilderJazz	Christian Jacob, solo
2011?	American Road		The Tierney Sutton Band, co-leader
2009?	Desire		The Tierney Sutton Band, co-leader
2007?	Live in Japan		Trio
2007?	On the Other Side		The Tierney Sutton Band, co-leader
2006?	Contradictions		The Christian Jacob Trio, leader
2005?	I'm with the Band		The Tierney Sutton Band, co-leader
2004?	Styne & Mine	(Self-released)	Most tracks trio, with Trey Henry (bass), Ray Brinker (drums); some tracks quartet, with Tierney Sutton (vocals) added
2004?	Dancing in the Dark		The Tierney Sutton Band, co-leader
2003?	Interplay		with Terje Gewelt
2002?	Duality		with Terje Gewelt
2001?	Blue in Green		The Tierney Sutton Band, co-leader
2000?	Unsung Heroes		The Tierney Sutton Band, co-leader
1999?	The Six Cycles		with Fritz Renold
1998?	Time Lines	Concord Jazz	Trio, with Steve Swallow (bass), Adam Nussbaum (drums)
1999?	Jazz Meets Classical		with Fritz Renold
1996	Maynard Ferguson Presents Christian Jacob	Concord Jazz	Trio, with John Patitucci (bass), Peter Erskine (drums)
1992?	Bostonian Friends		with Fritz Renold

=== As sideman ===
- 2015: Brian Eisenberg ~ "Sense of Gratitude" — Pianist
- 2014: Carl Saunders ~ "America" — Pianist
- 2014: Freda Payne ~ "Come Back to Me Love" — Pianist
- 2014: The Gary Urwin Jazz Orchestra ~ "A Beautiful Friendship" — Pianist
- 2014: The Swiss Youth Jazz Orchestra ~ "Future Steps" — Pianist, Arranger
- 2014: Sam Most ~ "New Jazz Standards" — Pianist
- 2013: Kuni Murai ~ "Arsene Lupin" — Pianist, Arranger
- 2012: Betty Buckley ~ "Ah Men! The Boys of Broadway"— Pianist, Arranger
- 2012: Scottish National Jazz Orchestra ~ "Celebration" — Arranger
- 2011: Phil Norman ~ "Encore" - Pianist, Arranger
- 2008: Vic Lewis ` "Celebration of Contemporary West Coast Jazz" — Pianist, Arranger
- 2007: Wayne Bergeron ~ "Plays Well With Others"—Pianist
- 2007: Maynard Ferguson ~ "One and Only" — Pianist, Composer, Arranger, Group Member
- 2007: The Carl Saunders Exploration ~ "The Lost Bill Holman Charts"—Pianist
- 2006: The Bill Holman Band ~ "Hommage"—Pianist
- 2005: The Bill Holman Band ~ "Live"—Pianist
- 2005: Flora Purim ~ "Flora's Song"—Pianist, Arranger
- 2005: Carl Saunders ~ "Can You Dig Being Dug"—Pianist
- 2005: Gene Burkert ~ "The Jazz Palette"—Pianist, Keyboard
- 2005: Phil Woods "Groovin' to Marty Paich"—Pianist, Music Director
- 2005: Terje Gewelt & Christian Jacob ~ "Hope"—Pianist, Composer, Arranger
- 2003: Flora Purim ~ "Speak No Evil"—Pianist
- 2003: Gary Meek ~ "Step 7"—Pianist
- 2002: Carl Saunders ~ "Be Bop Big Band" - Pianist
- 2002: Alan Kaplan ~ "Lonely Town"—Pianist
- 2001: West Coast All-Stars ~ "With Love To Gerry"—Pianist
- 2001: Flora Purim ~ "Perpetual Emotion"—Pianist, Arranger
- 1998: Vic Lewis ~ "West Coast All Stars"—Pianist
- 1998: Miki Coltrane ~ "I Think of You"—Pianist
- 1997: The Tierney Sutton Band ~ "Introducing Tierney Sutton"—Pianist, Arranger
- 1997: Tom Garling ~ "Maynard Ferguson Presents Tom Garling"—Pianist, Arranger
- 1997: Fritz Renold ~ "StarLight"—Pianist, Composer, Arranger
- 1997: Gene Burkert ~ "The System"—Pianist
- 1995: "Vic Lewis Presents West Coast Jazz"—Pianist
- 1994: Maynard Ferguson ~ "Live From London"—Pianist, Keyboards, Arranger
- 1993: Anita O'Day (with The Jack Sheldon Orchestra) ~ "Rules Of The Road"—Pianist
- 1993: Fritz Renold Quartet Plus 2 ~ "Shanti & Sri"—Pianist, Composer, Arranger
- 1992: Maynard Ferguson ~ "Footpath Cafe"—Composer, Arranger
- 1990: Christian Ledelezir (with Dave Liebman) ~ "Exaton"—Pianist
- 1988: Fabio Morgera/George Garzone ~ "Take One"—Pianist
- 1988: Vaughn Hawthorne ~ "The Path"—Pianist
