= Orogen (album) =

Studio album by John Burke
- Released: 2016
- Genre: New-age
- Length: 53:42
- Label: Independent

John Burke chronology
A Streetcar Named Desire (2015)	Orogen (2016)	Superstratum (2017)

Orogen is a solo piano album by American pianist John Burke. The album was inspired by the tectonic creation of mountains and utilizes melodic development to illustrate this creation. A self-released title, Orogen earned Burke a Grammy Award nomination for Best New Age Album.

== Track listing ==
No.	Title	Length
1.	"Arise"	5:45
2.	"Spring Tides"	4:11
3.	"The Traveler"	4:49
4.	"Autumn Blaze"	4:44
5.	"Batholith"	8:43
6.	"Riverswept"	6:35
7.	"Foot Traffic"	3:48
8.	"Windflower"	6:32
9.	"Earth Breaker"	3:27
10.	"Orogen"	5:09
