= Lady A (singer) =

American blues singer and activist (born 1958)

- Also known as: Lady A
- Born: Anita White; July 18, 1958 (age 68); Seattle, Washington, U.S.
- Occupation: Singer
- Instrument: Vocals
- Label: Independent
- Website: www.ladyababyblues.com

Anita White (born July 18, 1958), known professionally as Lady A, is an American singer of blues, soul, funk, and gospel music.

== Career ==
Born and raised in Seattle, Washington, she began singing at age five with her musical family, and her performance career began in the 1980s as a backup vocalist in a Motown cover band. She played in the group Lady A & the Baby Blues Funk band for 18 years and then went solo on tour in the Pacific Northwest and Mississippi Delta regions. She has released seven solo albums, debuting in 2010. She operates Lady A Productions, serving gospel and blues artists. She hosts, as of 2020, two music shows on NWCZ Radio online: Gumbo & Gospel, and Black N Blues (the B side). Her own music's subject matter has included anti-racist activism such as about the killing of Trayvon Martin and the murder of George Floyd.

=== Name conflict ===
On June 12, 2020, during the George Floyd protests, the country music group Lady Antebellum shortened its name to their nickname "Lady A" in an attempt to blunt the name's association to the Antebellum South, including the glorification of the Civil War and slavery. The next day, it was widely reported that the name had already been in use for more than 20 years by Anita White. The band members publicly admitted ignorance of any prior use, both when they had arbitrarily chosen the first name and again with this one, which White called "pure privilege". As reported by American Songwriter and Rolling Stone, White described the band's token acknowledgement of racism while blithely appropriating an African American artist's name: "They're using the name because of a Black Lives Matter incident that, for them, is just a moment in time. If it mattered, it would have mattered to them before. It shouldn't have taken George Floyd to die for them to realize that their name had a slave reference to it. It's an opportunity for them to pretend they're not racist". A veteran music industry lawyer observed that such name clashes are uncommon due to the existence of the Internet.

The band members contacted White the next week to apologize for inadvertently appropriating her name without any research, saying that the Black Lives Matter movement had inspired them to a collaborative attitude. However, they also expressed their intention to move forward with the Lady A name despite White's concern that simultaneous ownership of the trademark would be detrimental to her career. Initially enthusiastic, forgiving, and hopeful, she said "We talked about attempting to co-exist but didn't discuss what that would look like" reportedly because the band members would not directly respond to that explicit question three times during the conversation or in two contract drafts. Shocked upon receipt of the band's contract draft later that day, she said "Their camp is trying to erase me ... and I no longer trust them". She soon submitted a counteroffer that either the band would be renamed, or that her act would be renamed for a $5 million fee plus a $5 million donation to be split between Seattle charities, a nationwide legal defense fund for independent artists, and Black Lives Matter.

On July 8, 2020, the band filed a lawsuit against White—rejecting her counteroffer, and affirming the band's right to its own long-standing trademark of the name. The band stated: "Today we are sad to share that our sincere hope to join together with Anita White in unity and common purpose has ended."

On September 15, 2020, White filed a countersuit asserting her claim to the Lady A trademark under common law and rejecting the notion that both artists could operate in the same industry under the same brand identity. She is seeking damages for lost sales and a weakened brand, along with royalties from any income the band receives under the Lady A moniker.

The effects of this dispute between the two musical acts has also gone beyond just Anita White's solo career. In late October 2021, New Orleans–based folk musician Lilli Lewis released her album, "Americana." Prior to the album's release, Lewis had joined an online support group for Black female artists known as "Sista Gurls"—a group of which Lady A (Anita White) is also a member. The two artists connected through this support group and eventually recorded a song together titled "A Healing Inside." This song became the tenth track on Lewis' album with White having been credited under her professional stage name "Lady A." Soon after its release, the album was pulled from Spotify—a prominent music streaming service—due to "Lady A" being credited on the album. While it is unknown whether this was due to Spotify's algorithm flagging the content, believing the artists formerly known as Lady Antebellum were being falsely credited, or if it was taken down due to the legal disputes between the two musical acts, it is clear that the conflict between the artists using the "Lady A" moniker is at its root. The album was later returned to the streaming service on November 15, 2021, a little over two weeks after the album's release and within one week after Lewis became aware of the situation.

By February 2022, White and the band had settled their lawsuit; "the parties filed a joint request for dismissal to a judge in a federal Tennessee court" and the "terms of the settlement have not been disclosed".

== Reception ==
In 2016, Rick J. Bowen for Innocent Words magazine reviewed Loved, Blessed and Blues (2016), calling Lady A "one of the hardest working women of the Northwest music community" and the album "a reflection of the ten songs and Lady A’s philosophy on life, as she reflects and testifies to being blessed and loved and to the power of the blues" in which she delivers "an altar call with her full-throated alto leading the choir of voices lifted to the heavens". She is the cover feature of the January 2018 issue of Jefferson Blues Magazine. In 2018, John Mitchell with Blues Blast Magazine reviewed Doin’ Fine (2018), saying Lady A has a strong, Southern sounding voice which "delivers all these kinds of songs well" with his favorite being the "bright soulful" piece "Next Time U C Me". He remarked that Lady A plus the backing vocalists sometimes sound like a full choir, with a mixture of gospel and secular lyrics. She was nominated Best Blues Performer of the Year 2020 by the Washington Blues Society. In 2020, American Songwriter called her "a legendary soul & blues diva who has been beloved in the Pacific Northwest for decades, both for the unchained power of her soul and blues singing, and for her ongoing contributions to the community".

== Discography ==
Lady A has released seven solo albums and two singles.

=== Albums ===
- BlueZ in the Key of Me (2010)
- How Did I Get Here (2013)
- Loved, Blessed and Blues (2016) Apple Music
- Doin' Fine (2018)
- Lady A: Live in New Orleans (2020)
- Satisfyin' (2021)
- Just Bein' Me (2023)

=== Singles ===
- "The Truth is Loud" (2019)
- "My Name is All I Got" (2020)
