= Mya Byrne =

American singer-songwriter

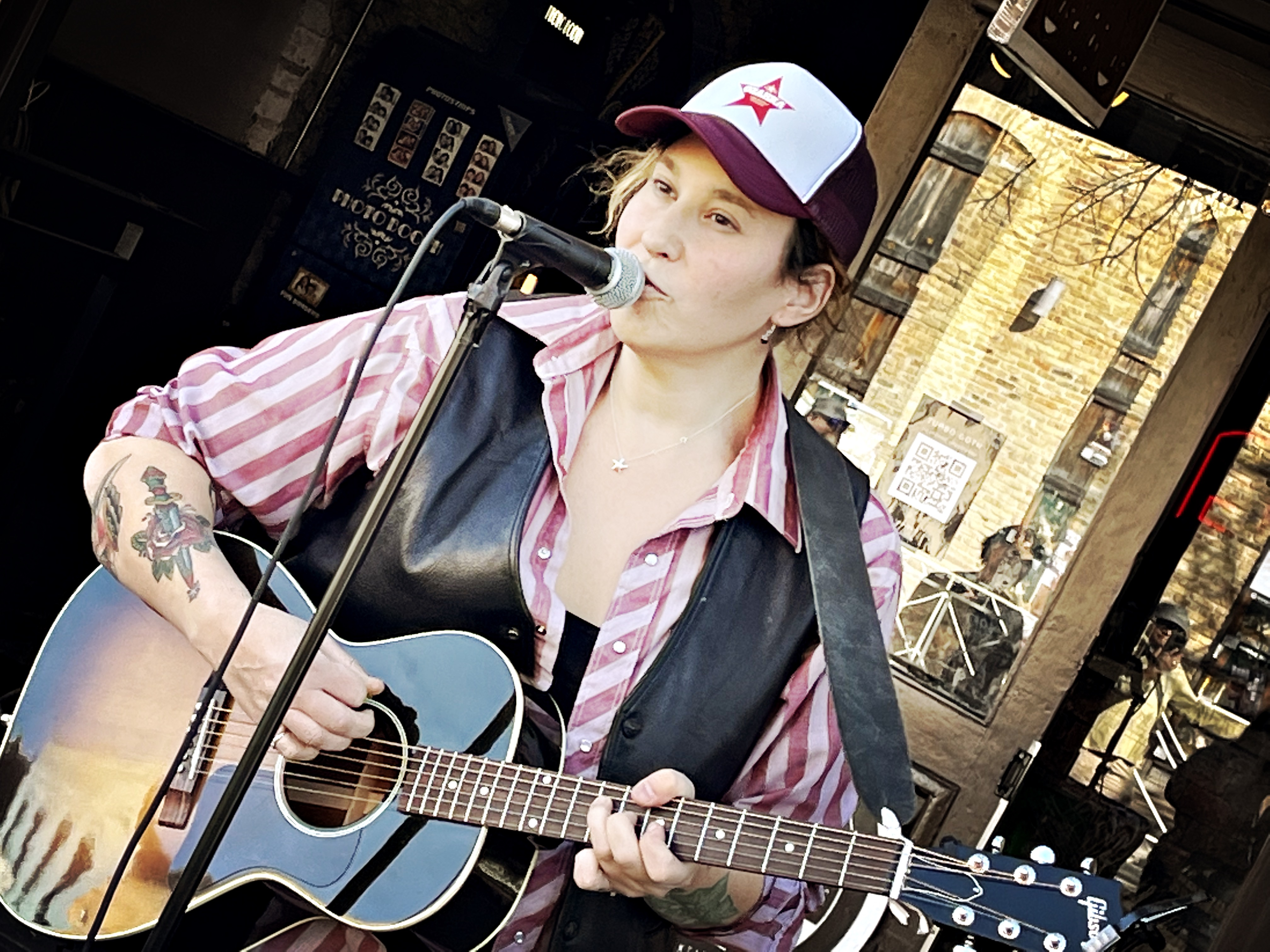

Background information
- Born: March 1, 1978 (age 48)
- Origin: Maplewood, New Jersey, United States
- Genres: folk, americana, country, punk
- Occupations: poet, singer, songwriter
- Instruments: Vocals, Guitar, Mandolin, Banjo, Lap Steel, bass guitar
- Years active: 2003–present
- Label: Kill Rock Stars
- Website: MyaByrne.com

Mya Adriene Byrne is an American singer-songwriter whose works falls mostly in the Americana vein, a combination of folk, blues and country music. Based in New York for 13 years, Byrne currently resides in Brooklyn after 8 years in the San Francisco Bay Area and performs solo or with various bands on both coasts. In 2014, Byrne publicly announced her transgender status and transition and has continued to work as a musician and performer.

She is the granddaughter of anesthesiology pioneer Philip H. Sechzer.

== Career ==
Over her career, Byrne has opened for acts such as Steve Forbert, Railroad Earth, Jack Hardy, Heartless Bastards, Rae Spoon, Greensky Bluegrass, Levon Helm, Pansy Division, Team Dresch, and Suzanne Vega.

In 2004, Byrne released her debut EP Dawn. She participated in the new song competition at the 2004 Newport Folk Festival, and was the recipient of a PLUS Award from ASCAP in 2004, 2005, 2010, 2012, 2013, and 2014.

She was the longtime host of a popular weekly open mike at Micky's Blue Room, and later, Banjo Jim's in Alphabet City, and was the lead guitarist in the Late Night band at Rockwood Music Hall from 2007 to 2009, performing weekly for most of its 18-month residency.

She released her first full-length album with The Ramblers in June 2008, with David Immergluck of Counting Crows on additional lead guitar. In 2008, The Ramblers were the opening act for Levon Helm of The Band at the Midnight Ramble in Woodstock, New York in June, and again at the Woodstock Playhouse that September.

In April 2010, The Ramblers released their second CD at Joe's Pub. In September 2010, Byrne played lead guitar with Kent Burnside, grandson of R.L. Burnside, at Buddy Guy's Legends in Chicago. The Ramblers also headlined Mercury Lounge that month. In October 2010, The Ramblers showcased at the CMJ Music Marathon in New York City, where they were noted as "Artists to Watch" by The Jazz Lawyer blog.

In July 2011, The Ramblers opened for Heartless Bastards at Mercury Lounge. Later that summer, they appeared at the Great South Bay and Port Jefferson Music Festivals. In January 2012, Byrne was the co-director for the Beatles Complete on Ukulele Festival at Brooklyn Bowl, alongside festival founder Roger Greenawalt, and another performance that March at South By Southwest. In 2012, Byrne became endorsed by D'Addario Strings. In February of that year, Byrne suffered a vocal hemorrhage.

By August, she had recovered enough to begin touring again behind her first solo acoustic record, Lucky, and subsequently appeared as a feature artist on John Platt's show on WFUV. The album reached No. 31 on the Roots Music Report charts for NY-based artists by January 2013.

In 2014, Byrne was named by New Jersey alternative music newspaper The Aquarian Weekly as one of the 30 most promising acts of 2014 and was chosen to compete in the WNYC "Battle of the Boroughs", and to perform as a showcase artist at the prestigious Northeast Regional Folk Alliance conference.

Later in 2014, after she announced her transition on her blog, Byrne gave interviews to Sing Out! and WFDU-FM radio, and her poetry was featured in The Advocate. In the summer of 2014, she performed at Rockwood Music Hall, the Falcon Ridge Folk Festival, and Montclair CenterStage.

Since 2014, Byrne has written several op-eds for The Advocate and Huffington Post on trans lives. She started as a staff writer for Country Queer magazine in 2020.

In 2015, Byrne was named an Emerging Artist at the Falcon Ridge Folk Festival, performing on the mainstage, and released her first solo full-length album, "As I Am". She was the first-place Americana winner in the 2015 Great American Song Contest, and appeared at the 2016 Philadelphia Folk Festival and again at Falcon Ridge. In 2016, her short story "Chain of Rocks" was published in The James Franco Review, selected by guest editor Ryka Aoki. In 2017, she performed at the San Francisco Trans March, and in early 2018, the Ms. San Francisco Leather contest.

Her music was also featured in "[Trans]formation", a new play on trans identity, in collaboration with The Living Canvas in Chicago.

Byrne formerly played bass and wrote songs for The Homobiles, a San Francisco-based queercore band fronted by Lynn Breedlove (formerly of Tribe 8), and Lavender Country, founded in 1973 and recognised by the Country Music Hall of Fame as the world's first openly gay country music band. She has also written songs and played lead guitar with the queer country band Secret Emchy Society.

In June 2019, Byrne headlined Berkeley Pride, and performed solo on the main stage of the San Francisco Dyke March.

In October 2021, Byrne composed and recorded the theme music for Amazon Music's Country Heat Weekly podcast, hosted by Kelly Sutton.

In January 2022, Byrne was named one of twelve artists to watch in 2022 by Nashville Scene and CMT.

In Sep 2022 Mya announced her signing to Kill Rock Stars in Rolling Stone and in January 2023 announced her debut for the imprint, “Rhinestone Tomboy”.
