= Rearrange My Heart =

Studio album by Che Apalache
- Released: August 9, 2019
- Genre: Bluegrass, Americana, Latin
- Length: 47:50
- Label: Free Dirt Records
- Producer: Béla Fleck

Che Apalache chronology
Latin Grass (2017)	Rearrange My Heart (2019)

Rearrange My Heart is the second studio album by Che Apalache, released on August 9, 2019. It was produced by Béla Fleck and was nominated for Best Folk Album at the 62nd Grammy Awards.

== Background ==
Che Apalache was formed in Buenos Aires in 2013. After living abroad in a number of countries including Spain and Japan, Joe Troop moved to Argentina in 2010 to teach bluegrass music, eventually forming a band with some of his best students. Troop notes that for their first five years they played only Appalachian music, and "that seemed amazing avant-garde to have a bluegrass band in the city of Buenos Aires." However, they later began to incorporate some of the Latin styles they had grown up with in Argentina and Mexico. Che Apalache initially played with an upright bass but eventually settled on the lineup of Martin Bobrik and Franco Martino, from Buenos Aires, and Pau Barjau, from Mexico. Their uncommon style caught the attention of Béla Fleck who decided to produce Rearrange My Heart in his home studio after Fleck saw them perform at his banjo camp. "These guys are just so unique and fascinating that it was impossible for me to say no," Fleck said. "Music should be about human expression and these guys are expressing it in spades."

== Production ==
The album was recorded in February 2019 by Richard Battaglia at Béla Fleck's home studio. Richard Dodd mastered the record.

== Personnel ==
- Joe Troop - fiddle, vocals
- Pau Barjau - banjo, vocals
- Martín Bobrik - mandolin, vocals
- Franco Martino - guitar, vocals

== Track listing ==
No.	Title	Length
1.	"Saludo murguero"	0:55
2.	"María"	3:55
3.	"The Dreamer"	4:30
4.	"24 de marzo (Día de la Memoria)"	3:40
5.	"Rock of Ages"	3:54
6.	"The Wall"	1:58
7.	"Rearrange My Heart"	4:10
8.	"春の便り (The Coming of Spring)"	4:07
9.	"New Journey"	6:01
10.	"La milonga del cuis empedernido"	3:08
11.	"Over in Glory / New Swing"	4:47
12.	"Once Took Me In"	6:45
Total length:		47:50
