= Country Queer =

Online music magazine, founded 2019

- Website type: Online magazine
- Available in: English
- Founded: 2019
- Country of origin: United States
- Owner: CQ Media LLC
- Founder: Dale Henry Geist
- Editor: Lilli Lewis
- Website: countryqueer.com
- Launched: September 2019; 7 years ago
- Current status: Inactive

Country Queer is an online music magazine that focuses on LGBTQ+ musical artists in Country and Americana music.

== History ==
Country Queer was founded by former No Depression staffer Dale Henry Geist. The publication launched in September 2019. Geist founded Country Queer in response to what he described as a noticeable absence of queer people in the music media he consumed, particularly in Country and Americana music. In describing how the publication began, Geist wrote:

I logged into GoDaddy and pointed the countryqueer.com domain to the WordPress site that had been Strange Fire. Back when I had a job, and more money than time, I’d bought the site from Cindy Emch, who had inherited it from its founder, Kevin James Thornton. I kept Cindy on as Editor-In-Chief, replaced the Strange Fire logo with ours, and we went to town.

— Dale Henry Geist, One Year of Country Queer: Greatest Hits

Shortly after its launch, folk rock singer-songwriter Aaron Lee Tasjan began following the publication on social media, and LGBTQ+ Country singer-songwriters Orville Peck and Brandy Clark agreed to interviews with Country Queer.

At its launch, Oakland musician Cindy Emch served as Country Queer's first editor-in-chief. A year later, Emch left the position to focus on her music. Geist assumed the role of editor-in-chief and led an editorial team that included Americana LGBTQ+ singer-songwriters Adeem the Artist (Editor) and Mya Byrne (Staff Writer), as well as Sydney Miller (Associate Editor), Rachel Cholst (Editor and Podcast Producer), Eryn Brothers (Staff Writer), and James Barker (Staff Writer).

In October 2020, Country Queer began publishing a bi-weekly column by editors Adeem the Artist and Annie Parnell entitled "Buried Treasure". The column focused on a selection of new releases by lesser known LGBTQ+ musical artists whom Country Queer described as "important but under-heard voices in queer country." Notable artists who have been featured in the column include Adrianne Lenker, Becca Mancari, Big Thief, Chris Housman, Ginger Minj, Girlpuppy, John-Allison Weiss, Meg Duffy, Terry Blade, and Waylon Payne.

On December 29, 2020, Country Queer launched a directory consisting of Country and Americana musical artists who publicly identify as LGBTQ+. On February 10, 2021, BillBoard reported that the publication had grown to 13,500 monthly visitors in January 2021–a 67% increase from December 2020. In September 2021, Country Queer presented a Rainbow Happy Hour showcase at the 2021 Americana Music Festival & Conference in Nashville, Tennessee. The showcase featured artists Jett Holden, Izzy Heltai, Joy Clark, Lilli Lewis, Lizzy No, Mya Byrne, Paisley Fields, and The Whitmore Sisters.

In November 2021, Lilli Lewis accepted an invitation to be Country Queer's interim editor-in-chief. Notable artists who have interviewed with Country Queer include Aaron Lee Tasjan, Amythyst Kiah, Brandy Clark, Jake Blount, Kattie Pruit, Ryan Cassata, and Terry Blade.
