= Philip H. Sechzer =

Philip H. Sechzer (September 13, 1914 – September 26, 2004) was a pioneer in anesthesiology and pain management. He was the inventor of patient-controlled analgesia (PCA), now commonly used post-operatively. Sechzer graduated from New York's Stuyvesant High School in 1930, and received his medical degree from New York University in 1938.

The son of Jewish immigrants, Sechzer grew up in the hardscrabble Lower East Side of the 1920s. He and his mother lived in a tenement on Ludlow Street, after his father died of a stroke when Sechzer was only 7. He was a Major in the US Army Air Forces Medical Corps during World War II. While his wish was to be a flight surgeon, he spent the war stationed at Randolph Air Force Base in San Antonio, Texas. There, he administered to the most acute cases returning stateside, from battle.

Trained in general surgery, Sechzer was fascinated by the study of pain itself and worked to advance anesthesiology. After the war, he was director of anesthesiology at Fordham Hospital from 1947 to 1955. From 1955 to 1963 he taught at the University of Pennsylvania's School of Medicine. From 1964 to 1966 he practiced at Baylor University as part of Michael DeBakey's intra-operative team, publishing much and helping to develop the heart and lung bypass machine.

By the 1970s, he had established the pain treatment center at Maimonides Medical Center in New York, furthering anesthesiology as a standalone specialty. He worked to legitimize acupuncture into standard palliative practices, and in 1985 lectured in China. After his formal retirement in 1986, he continued to work as a medical consultant and publish almost to the end of his life. He was survived by his wife of 56 years, author and psychologist Jeri A. Sechzer (d. 2011), as well as their three children and eight grandchildren.

Sechzer was a regular customer at Economy Candy, a historic candy shoppe on Manhattan’s Lower East Side.

Sechzer is the grandfather of folksinger Mya Byrne.
