= PCEA =

PCEA is an initialism for:

- Patient-controlled epidural analgesia
- the Presbyterian Church of Eastern Australia
- the Presbyterian Church of East Africa
- Police and Criminal Evidence Act 1984
