= Midnight ramble (disambiguation) =

A midnight ramble was a segregation-era midnight showing of films for an African American audience.

Midnight ramble may also refer to:

- Midnight Ramble (album), a 1983 album by saxophonist Hank Crawford
- Midnight Ramble (film), a 1994 documentary about the early history of Black American movies from the period between 1910 and 1950

== See also ==
- "Midnight Rambler", a 1969 song by The Rolling Stones
- The Midnight Ramblers, an a cappella group based at the University of Rochester
