= The Mountain Minor =

2019 drama film directed by Dale Farmer

- Official poster
- Directed by: Dale Farmer
- Written by: Dale Farmer
- Produced by: Susan Pepper; Dale Farmer
- Starring: Dan Gellert; Elizabeth LaPrelle; Ma Crow; Asa Nelson; Hazel Pasley; Jonathan Bradshaw; Warren Waldron; Amy Cogan Clay; Jonathan Bradshaw; Judy Waldron; Trevor McKenzie; Mike Oberst
- Cinematography: Paul Halluch
- Edited by: Eitan Abramowitz; Scott Young (additional)
- Music by: Trevor McKenzie
- Production company: Alt452 Productions
- Release dates: August 2018 (Jukebox International Film Festival); October 17, 2019 (United States)
- Running time: 89 minutes
- Country: United States
- Language: English
- Budget: $150,000 (estimated)

The Mountain Minor is a 2019 American drama film written, directed and co-produced by Dale Farmer, produced by Susan Pepper, and starring Dan Gellert, Elizabeth LaPrelle, Ma Crow, Asa Nelson, Hazel Pasley, Jonathan Bradshaw, Warren Waldron, Amy Cogan Clay, Judy Waldron, Trevor McKenzie and Mike Oberst. The film is noted for its on-screen performances of old-time music commonly associated with Appalachia.

== Plot ==
During the Great Depression, Vestal Abner, his wife Oza and their young son Charlie reluctantly move from their impoverished farm in Eastern Kentucky to Ohio, where Vestal has found a job. As Charlie grows up and eventually marries his childhood friend, Ruthie, he yearns to return to his boyhood home in the mountains, never losing his passion for the traditional mountain music of his ancestors.

== Cast ==
- Dan Gellert as Charlie Abner
- Ma Crow as Ruth Abner
- Asa Nelson as Young Charlie
- Hazel Pasley as Young Ruth
- Elizabeth LaPrelle as Oza Abner
- Jonathan Bradshaw as Vestal Abner
- Warren Waldron as Tom Abner
- Amy Cogan Clay as Dellie Abner
- Judy Waldron as Granny Whit
- Chuck Blackburn as Dan
- Mike Oberst as Willie Abner
- Trevor McKenzie as Ves Abner
- Susan Pepper as Sandra Abner
- Tracy Jarrell as Kim Abner
- Aaron Wolfe as Jimmie Abner
- Alison Moretz as Julie Abner
- Lucas Pasley as Hershel Abner
- Betty Wolfe as Hershel's Wife
- Wyatt Wolfe as Hershel's Grandson
- Naomi Jarrell as Willie Abner (baby)
- Rhoda Bradshaw as Sarah Abner
- Hubbard Bradshaw as Charlie Abner (toddler)
- James Moretz as Sandra Abner's Husband
- Josie Moretz as Sandra Abner's Daughter
- The Tillers (Mike Oberst, Sean Geal, Aaron Geal, Joe Macheret) as The Willie Abner Band
- Walton Conway as Man On Road
- Carolina Conway as Woman On Road
- Ed Pilkington as Elder Alton Radcliff
- Wade Wilmoth as Funeral Minister
- Gary Sampson as Ron
- Jean Pence as Jean
- Nick Schraub as Mark
- Cecil Gurganus as Square Dance Fiddler
- Dakota Phillips as Southgate House Audience
- Maria Carrelli as Southgate House Audience
- Brenton McMusiclover as Southgate House Audience
- Hannah Peacock as Southgate House Audience
- Zane Thompson as Southgate House Audience

== Background ==
Writer-director Dale Farmer made The Mountain Minor as a tribute to Appalachian culture and music, with the intention of portraying the characters realistically, not in the stereotypical manner in which mountain people are often depicted in film and television. Farmer, an old-time musician himself, loosely based the movie on the story of his grandparents, who migrated as children to Ohio from Jackson County, Kentucky during the 1930s. The title of the film refers to a banjo tuning often used in old-time music.

== Production ==
The Mountain Minor was a collaboration of Alt452 Productions, WonderlandWoods.tv and From the Heart Productions. The film spans several decades as it follows the characters Charlie Abner and Ruth Whit from childhood into adulthood, marriage and retirement. Though many scenes are set in Kentucky, they were filmed primarily at the historic Willet Ponds Farm in Todd, North Carolina for logistical and budget reasons. Other scenes were filmed in Newport, Kentucky; Oxford, Ohio; and Eaton, Ohio. Because of the film's emphasis on old-time music and Farmer's desire for authenticity, he decided to cast most of the main roles with experienced musicians, including Smithsonian Folkways recording artist Elizabeth LaPrelle (of the duo Anna & Elizabeth), Dan Gellert, Ma Crow and Mike Oberst of the band The Tillers. As Farmer told Bluegrass Today, “I figured that if I took professional musicians who are used to performing, that musicians would make better actors than actors make musicians.”

== Release and critical response ==
The Mountain Minor premiered at the Jukebox International Film Festival in Carson City, Nevada in 2018, where it received awards for Best of Festival and Best Picture-Runner Up. The film subsequently received awards in other festivals.

In addition to film festival awards, The Mountain Minor received positive reviews in several publications. Bill McGoun of the Asheville Citizen-Times called it "a powerful and true-to-life depiction of people doing what they needed to do to make their way in a sometimes difficult world". James Peterson for the Old-Time Central described the film as "highly entertaining, packed with beautiful scenery, and full of great tunes played masterfully by the actors themselves". Joel Wertman, president of The Heartland Network, said, "This film captures beautifully how the country music genre was born".

Following screenings at film festivals, The Mountain Minor had its commercial theatrical premiere at The Esquire Theatre in Cincinnati, Ohio on October 17 and October 20, 2019. Additional theatrical showings took place in other cities from November, 2019 until March, 2020. Subsequent theatrical showings were canceled as a result of the COVID-19 pandemic causing most movie theaters and other entertainment venues to shut down beginning in March, 2020.

With theaters closed, Alt452 Productions released The Mountain Minor on Blu-ray, DVD, Amazon and Vimeo on Demand in the spring of 2020. Several television entities also began showing, or making plans to show the film, including The Heartland Network, Kentucky Educational Television (KET) and West Virginia Public Broadcasting.

A soundtrack album, The Mountain Minor Motion Picture Soundtrack, was released on October 16, 2020.
