= Rachel Baiman =

American singer-songwriter

- Origin: Oak Park, Illinois, U.S.
- Genres: Country; Americana; bluegrass; old-time
- Occupation: Singer-songwriter
- Instruments: Vocals; fiddle; banjo; acoustic guitar
- Labels: Free Dirt; Signature Sounds Recordings
- Website: rachelbaiman.com

Rachel Darby Baiman is an American singer-songwriter and fiddler based in Nashville, Tennessee.

== Biography ==
Baiman grew up in Oak Park, Illinois. She has described her father as a "radical economist" and her mother is a social worker. When she was young, her parents took her to meetings at the Ethical Humanist Society of Greater Chicago. She moved to Nashville at age 18 to attend Vanderbilt University She became an Illinois State Fiddle champion at age 17.

Baiman is the co-founder of Folk Fights Back, a musician-led national organization that puts together benefit concerts and awareness events in response to the Trump administration. She also performs in the fiddle duo 10 String Symphony with Christian Sedelmyer.

She is married to George Jackson, a Nashville-based fiddle player from Australia.

Her 2017 album Shame was produced by Mandolin Orange's Andrew Marlin.

== Influences ==
Baiman has said her songwriting is influenced by Bluegrass and traditional music such as John Hartford as well as contemporary songwriters like Courtney Barnett.

NPR has said her music "captures the spirit of wry truth-telling" and Paste Magazine called her song "Shame" "a potent message from an especially powerful messenger." Vice's Noisey highlighted her political songwriting saying "Rachel Baiman's 'Shame' Will Have You Flipping Authority off One Song at a Time." American Standard Time said the record Shame is "iconoclastic folk that will be handed down in song and record for generations."

== Discography ==
Solo

- Speakeasy Man (2014), self-produced
- Shame (2017), Free Dirt Records
- Thanksgiving EP (2018), Free Dirt Records
- Cycles (2021), Signature Sounds Recordings
- Common Nation of Sorrow (2023), Signature Sounds Recordings
