= JP Harris =

American country musician

- Born: Joshua Pless Harris; February 13, 1983 (age 42); Montgomery, Alabama, United States
- Origin: Nashville, Tennessee, United States
- Genres: Country, Honky-tonk, outlaw country
- Occupation: Singer-songwriter
- Instruments: Vocals, electric guitar, clawhammer banjo
- Labels: Free Dirt Records, Cow Island Music

Joshua Pless "JP" Harris (born February 13, 1983) is an American country singer, songwriter, guitarist, and clawhammer banjoist based in Nashville, Tennessee.

== Career ==
Harris was born in Montgomery, Alabama, in 1983. He spent much of his early life between Montgomery and Dadeville, AL, where his relatives had lived since the Revolutionary War. His mother was a teacher and his father worked in heavy construction. When he was seven, his family moved to Apple Valley, California, and later to Las Vegas. When Harris was fourteen he left home after finishing the 8th grade.

After leaving home, he spent time in Oakland, California; he chose the Bay Area as the California punk bands of the 1980s and early 1990s had a major influence on his early musical development, and later spent a year in Arizona where he worked as a sheep herder for a group of Navajo elders. Throughout this time, Harris freighthopped across the US, eventually finding his way to the town of Halifax, Vermont, where he lived for over a decade. He worked as a sheet metal scrapper, orchard worker, farmer laborer, luthier, heavy equipment operator, logger, and mainly as an historic restoration carpenter. He moved to Nashville, TN in 2011. From the time he was sixteen until his relocation to Nashville, he lived in various remote cabins without electricity or running water for nearly 13 years.

Despite his busy tour schedule, Harris continues to work as a carpenter within the music community in Nashville. Harris still occasionally builds open-back banjos, though has only produced four instruments since leaving Vermont.

He performs primarily with his band the Tough Choices and as a duo with Chance McCoy of Old Crow Medicine Show. In 2014 he curated and produced the one-off Keep It Country Music Festival at Bandit Town in North Fork, CA, with the express purpose of showcasing Bakersfield country legend Red Simpson. This was the last major public appearance by Red before his death in 2015. The festival also featured Whitey Morgan, Nikki Lane, and other indie-country acts. Harris has continued to curate and produce recurring and one-off events for AmericanaFest, LR Baggs Acoustic Amplification, and the Newport Folk Festival.

He has performed at many of the major folk and roots festivals including Newport Folk Festival, The Lowell Folk Festival, FloydFest, and many others.

== Influences ==
Harris heard country music growing up in Alabama but didn't start playing the genre until he left home at age 14. He's noted that he didn't appreciate the genre until he lived on his own: "The reason country music became more resonant with me as I got older is that it’s sort of identifiable by anybody. Everybody’s just working to get by, and country music just happens to be the soundtrack to that.”

After his interest in punk and heavy metal waned in his teenage years, he discovered the old-time music scene and began playing clawhammer banjo. "All I wanted to do was go to fiddler's conventions all summer long and play music till the sun came up," says Harris. "So, at that time, I was really opposed to plugging anything in, even people putting pickups on their guitars." His musical style has also been heavily influenced by the early country music of the Carter Family, Jimmie Rodgers, Doc Watson, and the 1960s and 70s generation of artists like George Jones, Willie Nelson, Waylon Jennings, and Merle Haggard. Harris describes his music as simply "country," however others have noted influences like western swing, honky-tonk, outlaw country, and the Bakersfield sound. Wide Open Country has described Harris' voice as "timeless."

== Discography ==
- I'll Keep Calling (JP Harris and the Tough Choices, 2011), Cow Island Music
- Home Is Where The Hurt Is (JP Harris and the Tough Choices, 2014), Cow Island Music
- Sometimes Dogs Bark at Nothing (2018), Free Dirt Records
- Don't You Marry No Railroad Man (JP Harris' Dreadful Wind and Rain, 2021), Free Dirt Records
- JP Harris is a Trash Fire (2024), Bloodshot Records

=== with Chance McCoy ===
- Two Bad Hombres (2017), self-released

=== EPs and singles ===
- Why Don't We Duet in the Road (2016), Demolition & Removal Records
- Why Don't We Duet in the Road (Again) (2019), Demolition & Removal Records
- Take Off Your Tin Foil Hat (2021), Demolition & Removal Records
