= Anna & Elizabeth =

Americana/folk music duo

- Anna Roberts-Gevalt (right) and Elizabeth LaPrelle (left) performing in 2017

Background information
- Genres: Americana; Appalachian folk; close harmony; avant-folk
- Years active: 2012–2019
- Labels: Free Dirt Records; Smithsonian Folkways
- Past members: Elizabeth LaPrelle; Anna Roberts-Gevalt

Anna & Elizabeth were an Americana/folk music duo formed by Anna Roberts-Gevalt and Elizabeth Laprelle, integrating experimental music with authentic performances of folk songs from both the north and south of the US.

== Background ==
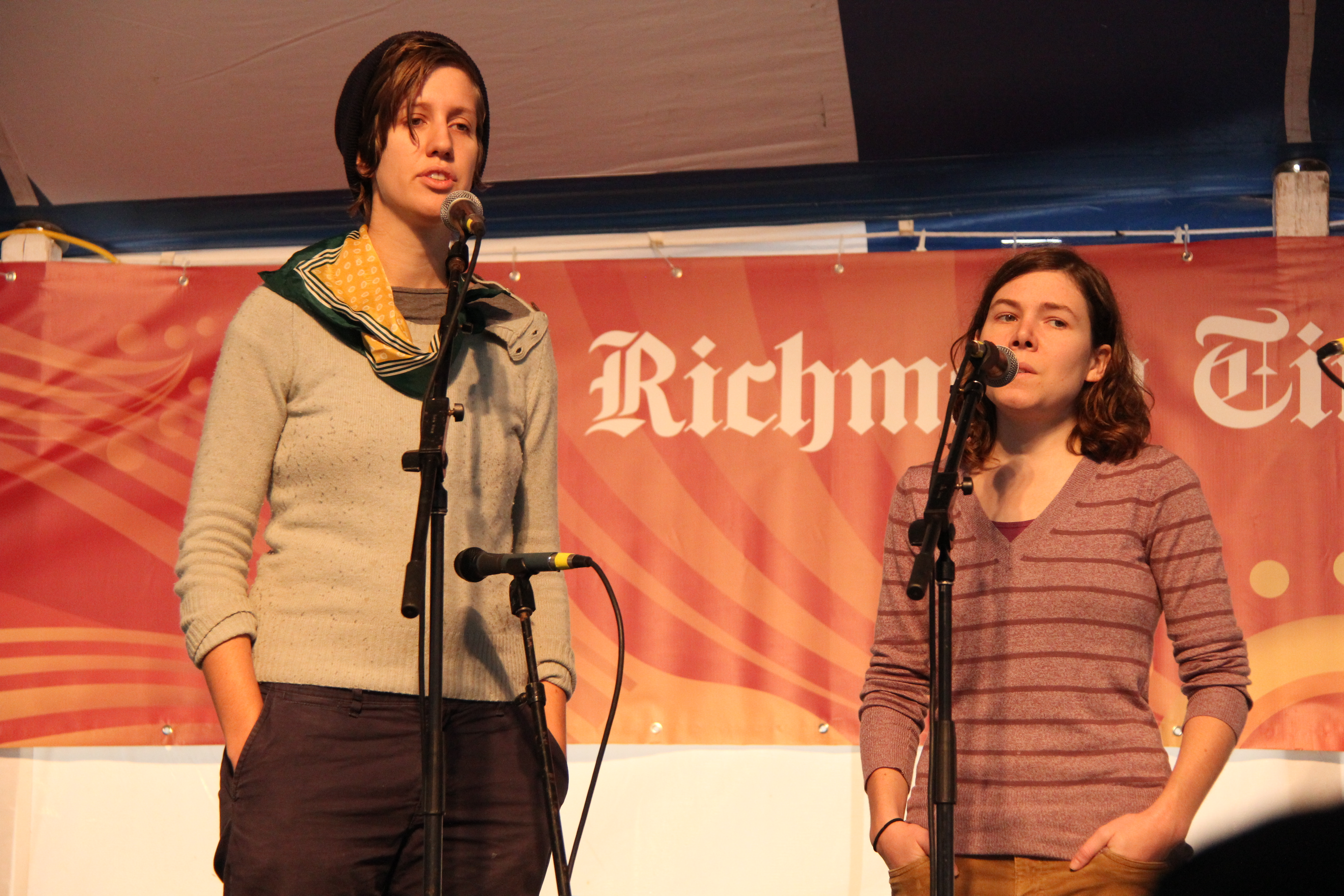
Anna & Elizabeth performing at the 2013 Richmond Folk Festival

Elizabeth LaPrelle is a banjo player and singer from Cedar Springs, Wythe County, Virginia. She graduated from the College of William and Mary, specializing in traditional Appalachian singing and has three solo albums, apart from her work with Anna and Elizabeth.

Anna Roberts-Gevalt is a multi-instrumentalist who was raised in Hinesburg, Vermont, and attended Champlain Valley Union High School. She played violin and viola for the Vermont Youth Orchestra.

== History ==
The two met in 2010 and have released three albums together. Their first album Sun to Sun, was originally released in 2013, and was re-released in 2016. Their 2015 self-titled second album was released on Free Dirt Records in 2015. Their third album, the invisible comes to us, released in 2018, integrates authentic folk music extracted from archives in the Virginia Center for the Creative Arts and at the MacDowell Colony in Peterborough, New Hampshire, among others. The album integrates folk music with electronic sounds and sonic experiments. Their third album was received with critical acclaim.

In 2019, Elizabeth LaPrelle made her acting debut, costarring in the award-winning film The Mountain Minor as a young Eastern Kentucky woman during the Great Depression.

The duo stopped performing together after the supporting tour of their third album, and has turned to working on separate projects. Anna Roberts-Gevalt has largely stopped performing as a touring musician since the COVID-19 pandemic due to health concerns.

== Discography ==
- Sun To Sun (2013)
- Anna & Elizabeth (2015)
- The Invisible Comes To Us (2018)
