= The Hackensaw Boys =

String band based in central Virginia

Hackensaw Boys
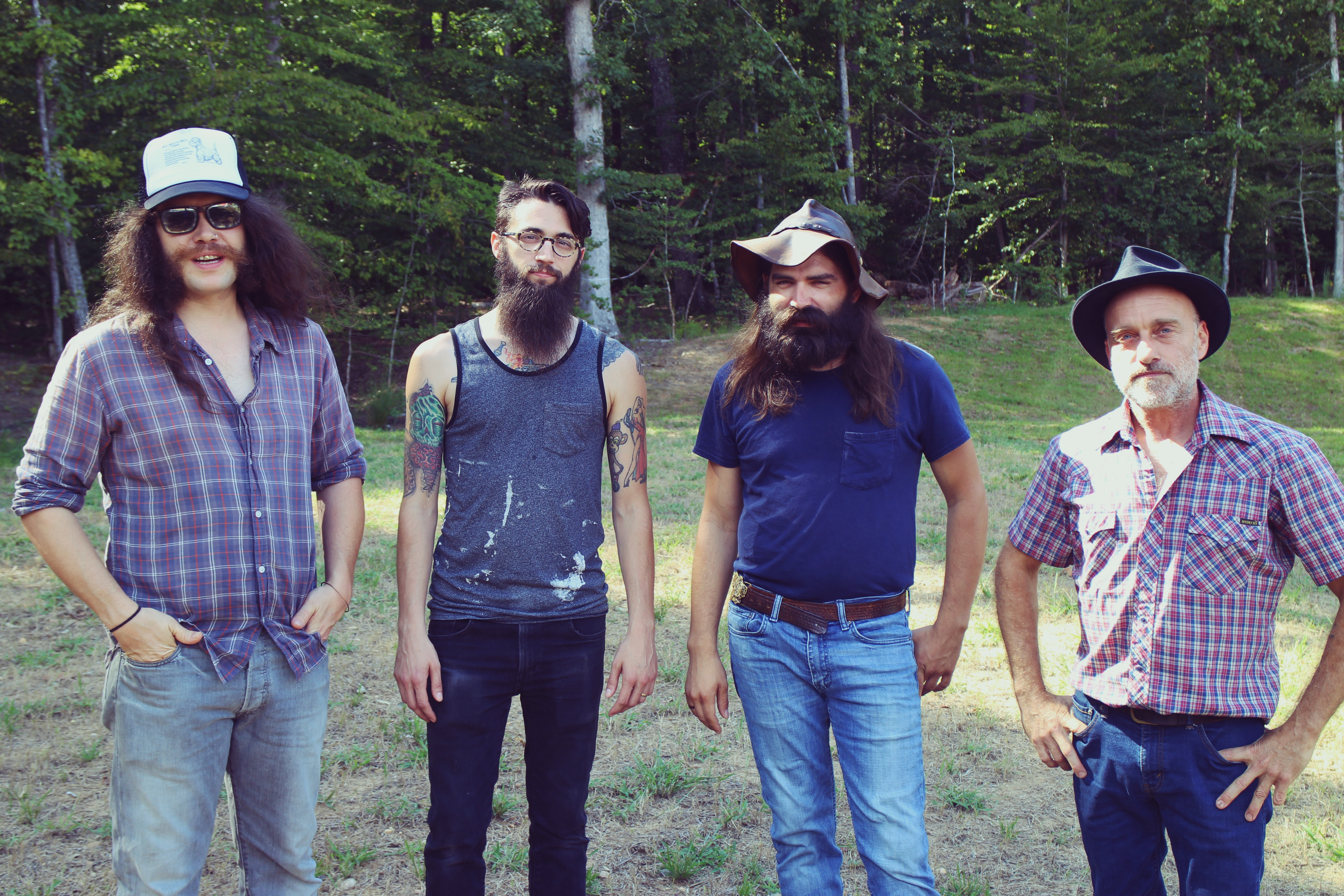
- Hardywood Craft Brewery; September 1, 2018

Background information
- Origin: Charlottesville, Virginia
- Genres: Americana, old-time, folk, adult contemporary, country, alternative
- Years active: 1999–present
- Labels: Free Dirt, Nettwerk
- Members: David Sickmen (guitar); Caleb Powers (fiddle); Beau Dodson (drums/percussion); Chris Stevens (bass)
- Past members: Jimmy Stelling (Banjo); Ferd Moyse (fiddle); Brian Gorby (drums/percussion); John Miller (bass); Ben Townsend (fiddle/banjo); Ward Harrison (guitar); Shawn Galbraith (banjo); Jesse Fiske; Justin Neuhardt (spoons/saw/charismo); Rob Bullington (mandolin/guitar); Tom Peloso; Charlie Bell; Robert St. Ours; David Goldstein; Chris Johnson; Pokey LaFarge; Phillip St. Ours; Phil Gianniny; William Gage; Aaron Farrington; Jon Goff (Double Bass); Matt Russo (spoons)
- Website: Official site

The Hackensaw Boys are a string band based in central Virginia that formed in 1999. The band has drawn on many musical influences and are "[k]nown best for rowdy, energetic live shows." They have performed at Bonnaroo, Lockn', FloydFest, and the All Good Music Festival. The band tours continuously and claims twenty or more current and former members. The current four-piece lineup contains only one original member, David Sickmen, who rejoined the group in 2012 (after quitting in 2005).

In April 2016 the band released Charismo on Free Dirt Records, their first studio album in almost a decade — which was produced by Larry Campbell.

== History ==
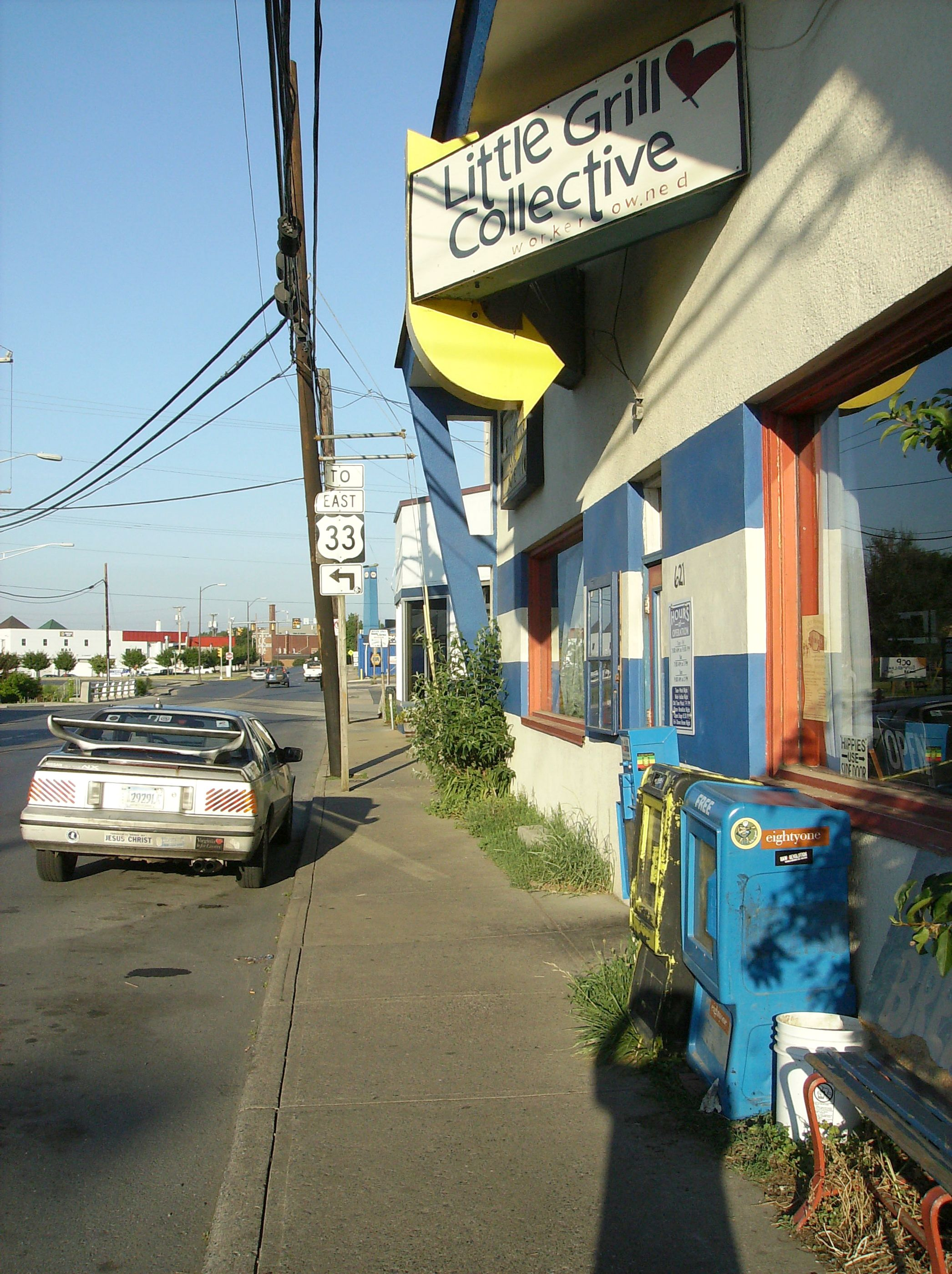
Little Grill Collective in Harrisonburg, Virginia.

The Hackensaw Boys were founded in the Fall of 1999 by Rob Bullington, Tom Peloso, David Sickmen, and Robert "Bobby" St. Ours who were all living in Charlottesville, Virginia at the time. Sickmen and Bullington met in Harrisonburg, Virginia in the early 1990s when the latter was attending James Madison University there. Bullington was playing in a band called Fried Moose, while Sickmen was in a group called Pieboy with Ward Harrison (who would later join Hackensaw).Peloso formed a band with some friends in the same decade called Chigger, singing lead and playing the "doghouse bass". All had performed as young musicians on the open mic stage at the Little Grill diner in Harrisonburg, as well.

Before starting The Hackensaw Boys, Sickmen and Peloso had been talking about other possible music projects. The four founding members decided to form an old-time music group — infused with the energy and spirit of punk rock.

Hackensaw would later develop their own sound busking on the streets of Virginia. Ferd Moyse joined the group at the Town Pump Tavern in Black Mountain, North Carolina where they would often play. As a bartender at the tavern, Moyse would sit in with the band on "old-time fiddle" until he "just had to join".

We've been around since 1999 in various incarnations. I guess we're more like a family than a band. ... It's been an odyssey, a constantly movable feast. People have moved back and forth and in and out and we've had our ups and downs.

— David Sickmen

After experiencing vocal trouble for almost a decade, Sickmen had surgery to remove vocal polyps in 2015. Though the operation may not have improved his singing voice, he says, his voice is "stronger" as a result of undergoing it.

Actually, at one point, I didn't have a bass, and so Dave [Sickmen] had a '63 Buick Wildcat that he traded for a standup bass.

— Tom Peloso, former member

=== "The Dirty Bird" ===
In the Fall of 2000, an enlarged group of twelve musicians departed from Virginia in a 1964 GMC motorcoach, nicknamed "The Dirty Bird", on the six-week Get Some Tour of "theaters, bars, street corners and alleys." The bus had been given to the group by Charlottesville developer Oliver Kuttner, together with a second one dubbed "Ramblin' Fever," which went to Mark S. Hahn, then owner of the Blue Moon Diner. Hahn briefly served as manager for the group.

=== Touring ===
We'd been around the country once on our own and then Cake picked us up for a tour after we opened up for them. And then that sort of spawned them picking us up for that package tour . . it sort of thrust us into the world of big arena touring. So we were like, 'This is easy! We can do this.' And then it's not always like that. Before that, and even since then, we play a lot of small-scale, half-attended bars in random cities all over the countries and so did all those bands.

— Rob Bullington, former member

The group took part in the Unlimited Sunshine Tour the first two years. The 2002 tour included headliner Cake, De La Soul, The Flaming Lips, Modest Mouse, and Kinky. In addition to Cake, the 2003 tour featured Cheap Trick, "garage rockers" The Detroit Cobras, and "country legend" Charlie Louvin of the Louvin Brothers. In 2003 they served as Country Music Hall of Fame member Charlie Louvin's backing band on one of his last nationwide tours. They opened for Modest Mouse twice (a group founding member Tom Peloso eventually joined). The group continued to gain "a following as it traveled." It has performed with such major acts as Cracker, Camper Van Beethoven, and Railroad Earth. A tour in Europe featured events in Belgium and the Netherlands. Overseas they have performed in such cities as Antwerp, Amsterdam, London, Dublin, Brussels, and Utrecht. At the height of their popularity they have played venues in major music towns like Seattle, Asheville, San Francisco, Minneapolis, Knoxville, New York, Portland, Baltimore, Atlanta, Chicago, and Los Angeles.

Prior tours included appearances at the Bonnaroo Music Festival (2003 and 2004), Telluride Bluegrass Festival in Colorado (2003), All Good Music Festival (2004 and 2006), FloydFest in Virginia (2003), and Pickathon in Oregon. Appearances at European music festivals include Pukkelpop in Belgium (2005) and Bergenfest in Norway (2007 and 2008).

=== Nicknames ===
They came up with nicknames for each other because it seemed all of the old country and blues performers had them. This became a big part of their act. Original members included Robert "Mahlon" Bullington (1999–2011), Thomas "Pee Paw" Peloso (1999–2004), David "Shiner" Sickmen (1999–2005; rejoined 2012), and Robert "Uncle Blind Bobby" St. Ours (1999–2003). Phillip "Jigsaw" St. Ours played washboard in both Hackensaw and Old Crow early on (1999–2001), and then for Hackensaw in (2008). Other early members included Jesse "Baby J." Fiske (1999–2011), Phil "Slate Hill Phil" Gianniny (1999–2001; d. 2006), and Jimmy "Kooky-Eyed Fox" Stelling (1999–2007). Others to join the ever-evolving group have included Chris "Sawzall" Johnson (1999–2001), Justin "Salvage" Neuhardt (1999–2010), David "Bellows Lugusi" Goldstein (1999–2004), Charlie "C.B." Bell (1999–2004), and Shawn "Plantain" Galbraith (2007–2012). Ferd "Four" Moyse joined in 2004, Ward "Cousin Spits" Harrison in 2006, Brian "Nugget" Gorby in 2010, and Ben "JuJu" Jacobs in 2012.

=== Band name ===
The Hackensaw Boys derived their name "from the actions you perform on a mandolin (hack) and a fiddle (saw)." Says Bullington "it was one of those jokes that sort of sticks . . and after about a week and you've played six or seven shows during the course of that week, you have no choice but to keep the name."

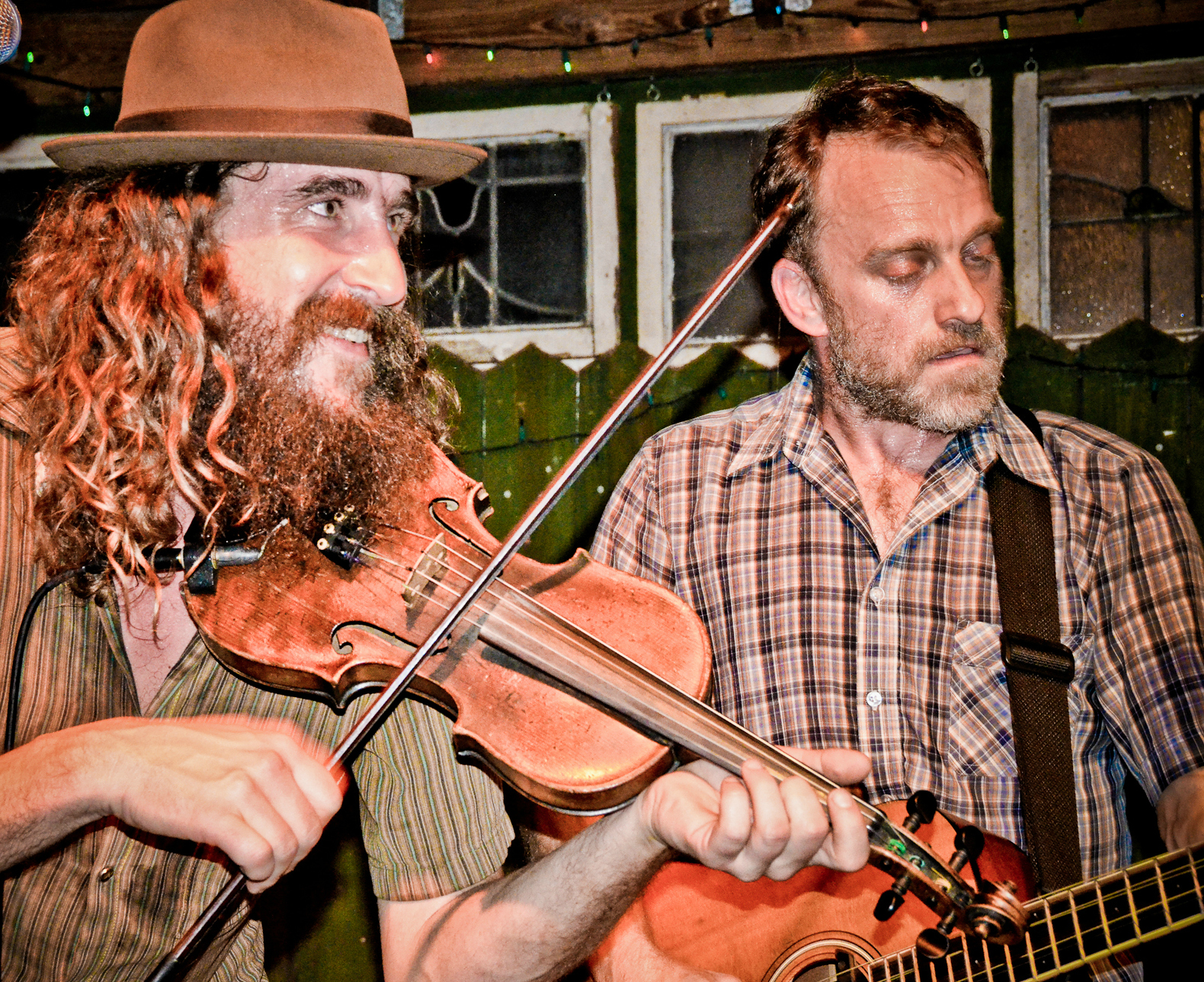
Ferd Lionel "Four" Moyse, IV on fiddle and David Sickmen on guitar at New World Brewery, Ybor City, Tampa, Florida on January 26, 2012.

== Recordings ==
The first two Hackensaw Boys albums were released by the Valley Entertainment label: Get Some in 2000 and Keep It Simple in 2002. The releases proved to have limited commercial appeal.

Our guitar player wrote 'Keep It Simple'; there's been some times where things seem to get so complicated with this whole thing. He wrote this song and played it over the phone, left a message, kinda sayin', 'Let's not forget where we came from, let's remember to keep it simple and not let things get away from us.'

— Tom Peloso, former member

"Keep It Simple, is packed with vigorous, pitchy bursts" notes Amanda Petrusich in her Pitchfork review, noting the album "doesn't perfectly reflect the band's fast-and-fierce live show . .

. . but it offers a solid glimpse of their proclivity for catchy melodies, classic harmonizing, and stringy noodling. Somehow, the band infuses their grassy tornado with brazen punk attitude and catchy pop structure, while simultaneously remaining vehemently sincere; tracks like "Dance Around" feature prototypically bluegrassian lyrics ("Dancin' with the girls/ That's a mighty fine thing/ You ain't gotta buy no wedding ring") without mocking the traditions from which they came.

Get Some was recorded by Rhoderick Cole in his Charlottesville mansion. Keep It Simple was recorded in Sickmen's apartment in Charlottesville's Linen Building, also by Cole who did the sound engineering on both recordings. Give It Back, released in 2004, was self-produced.

The group signed with the music label Nettwerk for the 2005 release of "Love What You Do". Their second release for Nettwerk Records, Look Out! in 2007, was a "celebratory but defiant sound culled from old-time mountains, backstage doorways and punishing drives through the evolving American landscape" according to Isthmus/The Daily Page.

In many ways (Look Out!) is a return to classic Hackensaw form, the punk-amped, old time foot-stompers and ragged harmonies that gained the band its reputation in the live setting when it formed seven years ago. One of the best additions is fiddler Ferd Moyse, who tears through the opening 'Look Out Dog, Slow Down Train!' with blazing fury.

— The Daily Progress

Another reviewer concurred, stating the album "is the Boys at their best, a perfect medium between their raw early years and the more polished sound of their previous release." Bullington states Look Out! "was definitely an attempt to capture sonically and as beautifully as possible, the sound of the Hackensaws onstage." The group went into the studio "with the defined intention of . . trying to capture the live performance as best as we possibly could. And I think we totally succeeded in doing that." The album "got to No. 6 on the Americana music charts" and "contained nine originals including a couple from the sometimes Modest Mouse, sometimes Hackensaw Tom Peloso."

Following the release of Love What You Do and Look Out!, The Hackensaws departed from Nettwerk Records to release two independently produced six-song EPs, The Old Sound of Music, Vol. 1 and The Old Sound of Music, Vol. 2 These two collections are "recommended for anyone who feels that time, popularity and (maybe) Don Was has watered down Old Crow Medicine Show, The Hackensaw Boys bring the Appalachian string band roots with punk rock flowers hard and raw." The albums resulted from recording sessions held at the Sound of Music studios in Richmond, Virginia. They were mastered by Grammy award winner Charlie Pilzer. As with Look Out! in 2007, all songs were engineered by Bryan Hoffa, archival audio restoration specialist at the Library of Congress. The titles, bestowed by Ferd Lionel Moyse IV were inspired by the fact that these were the last two recording projects to come out of the old Sound Of Music facility, which has recently moved to a new building in Richmond.

=== Charismo (2016) ===
The group released Charismo through Free Dirt Records in 2016, after almost a decade without putting together a studio album. Larry Campbell produced. Glide Magazine said of the album that the group take "a tack similar to that of Old Crow Medicine Show, the Punk Brothers, The Howlin' Brothers and other modern outfits that draw from the past to make an impression in the present." They went on to say that theirs is "a sound once heard on back porches throughout the heartland, now brought to life with the stirring enthusiasm of would-be rock stars performing for appreciative audiences."

. . when we were making this record, we realized that the only true constant in this band from the very first tour on to the present day has been the charismo. So that is what we named the new record, because it personifies our work ethic. It's like -- you have to put something together, then try to maintain it, find new players for it. You know, its like holding something together that looks like it could fall apart, and that is what this band has been about.

New Material - Lineup Change (2018–2019)

In January 2018, the band saw the exit of Ferd Moyse and Brian Gorby, to focus on family and other musical projects. Face to face with the possibility and fear of having to hang it all up, David recruited long-time friend and former band-mate from a previous project, Beau Dodson for charismo, drums/percussion and vocals. Chris Stevens, who had sat in on bass for Hackensaw in the past, was brought on full time, adding bass to the line-up once again after a stint without. To round out the new line-up, Chris recommended his astonishingly talent band-mate and pal Caleb Powers for fiddle and vocals. In December 2018 the reformed team entered the studio to record a five-song EP, due to be released in the spring of 2019.

== Charismo (the instrument) ==
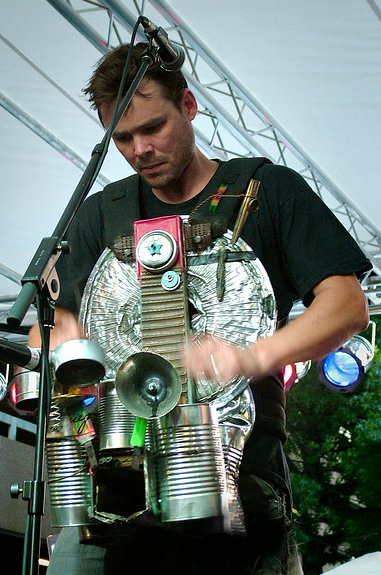
Justin Neuhardt on charismo with The Hackensaw Boys, Legacy Credit Union Stage--Birmingham, Alabama June 15, 2008.

A distinctive aspect of the Hackensaw live-performance experience is the percussion instrument known as a "charismo". Invented and played by former band member Justin "Salvage" Neuhardt, who also performed on spoons and the musical saw, it is described as "a home-made tin can contraption." As founder Sickmen remembers it:

Just before we went out on a 6-week tour, Justin came to us and said, "I can't come on tour for 6 weeks JUST playing the spoons," but at the time we didn't want a drummer with a full kit, so I said to him, "Why don't you just make something up?" So he did! He came back with the very first Charismo, which he'd made out of tin cans, hub caps, and general scrap he'd found around the diner. It was pretty primitive, but when he hit it with those metal brushes and I heard that train sound, I knew it was what we wanted."

Calvin James Pynn of The Tartan (Radford University) states "Neuhardt's charismo" is the "most notable" of the group's instruments:

. . a homemade percussion instrument made from tin cans, license plates, a hubcap, and book bag straps, and then mercilessly beat with wire-brush sticks. While old-time music is generally marked by its strict absence of percussion, the charismo has an almost symbolic presence in The Hackensaw Boys' music and live shows, and is an irreplaceable aspect of their sound.

In an interview with Scott Simon of NPR, Neuhardt himself explains how it came to be:

Q: Salvage . . now you say you play a pile of junk?

A: That's right.

Q: We're looking at your instrument now has . . like, half a dozen tin cans, a punctured aerosol can . .

A: A coconut milk can, tea can, breath mints, bike bells . .

Q: Hubcap is that?

A: Hubcap, yep, found on the border of Colorado. Most of it has just come from where ever we've been, and various recycling centers around the United States.

Q: So you keep adding to your instrument?

A: Well, I, uh, usually just make 'em and break 'em, and then make a new one. It's kind of ever-evolving, sort of ever-changing.

Brian Gorby, Neuhardt's friend and former bandmate in the percussion-heavy jam-band Humble Sacrifice, has carried on the charismo's tradition in the Hackensaw Boys as their touring percussionist. With funk influences, Gorby uses the charismo to bring a rambunctious flair to the band's old-time style.

== Musical style ==
When we typically do our shows, there's the raucous and the wild show and then we hop off the microphones and do acoustic songs. That is the testing ground for the new material. There's not as much pressure under the microphones and the lights. That is where we sneak stuff in. . . it's one of our favorite times of the show . . If you don't have a porch, we bring the porch to you.

— Ward Harrison, former member

Like the name dictates, the Hacksensaw Boys are all about finger picking banjos, fiddles and baritone harmonies run through the punk rock blue grass ringer. They are as likely to hit home with hippies as rockabillies, or anyone who wants to raise a glass and stomp a hole through the ole wooden dance floor.

— Herohill, Review of Look Out!

I don't get that fired up that many other times in my life like when we play our songs. It's remarkable how it can transform you that way, especially when you see old people get up and shuffle around dance style. I've seen some people make fools of themselves in a most delightful way. We play at ridiculous tempos, screaming and hollering, seemingly doing musically questionable, possibly atrocious things by pop culture standards, but if you're there and involved with it there's raw excitement. You can't package that.

— Jesse Fiske, former member

As former member and founder Bullington puts it "we can play an old folks home in the afternoon and then play for a bunch of punk rockers, or whoever else might still be up and ready for a good time, or some music at midnight. They all seem to enjoy it equally." Fellow founder Sickmen claims "the original intent of the band . . was to bring old-time Appalachian country punk rock." Band member Jesse "Baby J." Fiske questions the importance of assigning a specific style: "We're not really an old-time band either. As long as we speak to someone, it doesn't really matter what the genre is." The group largely performs original material, with a traditional feel. As former member Shawn Galbraith, banjo player, puts it: "We play original material provided by different members of the band. There are some traditional elements to our sound for sure, but we always try to maintain some uniqueness." "I don't think many people would call us a traditional oldtime band," states bandleader David Sickmen: "I'd say our songs are about ninety percent originals. Then we have some old-time songs we play in our own way."

As always, the band has been touring across the country like a pack of mad dogs, delivering the old-time, front-porch sounds of the Blue Ridge Mountains through a filter of punk angst.

— Jedd Ferris, The Daily Progress

== Awards, honors, distinctions ==
- Hackensaw Boys served as Country Music Hall of Fame member Charlie Louvin's backing band on a nationwide tour in 2003.
- Hackensaw Boys opened, along with King Wilkie, for The Del McCoury Band at that group's 2004 New Year's Eve bluegrass blowout at Nashville's Ryman Auditorium (former home of the Grand Ole Opry). The bill also featured the Waybacks and Whitey Johnson.
- Hackensaw Boys have performed at many prominent U.S. music festivals, including All Good Music Festival (2004 and 2006), Bonnaroo (2004), Telluride (2003), and FloydFest (2003).
- Hackensaw Boys appeared on National Public Radio's Weekend Edition with Scott Simon Saturday on November 26, 2005, and again on April 23, 2016. Making Their Own Kind of Music featured interviews and performances Robert Bullington, David Sickmen, Justin Neuhardt, Jesse Fiske, Jimmy Stelling, and Ferd Moyse, IV.
- Hackensaw Boys have twice performed at the prestigious European music festival in Norway, Bergenfest, where they shared the stage with Marianne Faithfull, Pet Shop Boys, and Shooter Jennings—in 2007—and Delbert McClinton, Mary Gauthier, Patti Smith, and Southside Johnny & The Asbury Jukes—in 2008.
- Hackensaw Boys were nominated for the Independent Country Music Awards "Best Bluegrass Band, Duo, or Group" category, 2012.

== Personnel ==
When we started the band . . I happened to be the one who had a mandolin 'cause I had inherited it from my great uncle who was in a band called the Roanoke Jug Band back in the Twenties . . I had never really thought about playing the mandolin, but I had one and therefore I became the mandolin player.

— Rob Bullington, founder

Current line-up as of May 2022:

- David Sickmen - Guitar/Vocal
- Caleb Powers - Fiddle/Vocal
- Chris Stevens - Bass
- Jonah Gillespie-Sickmen - Charismo/Drums/Percussion/Vocal
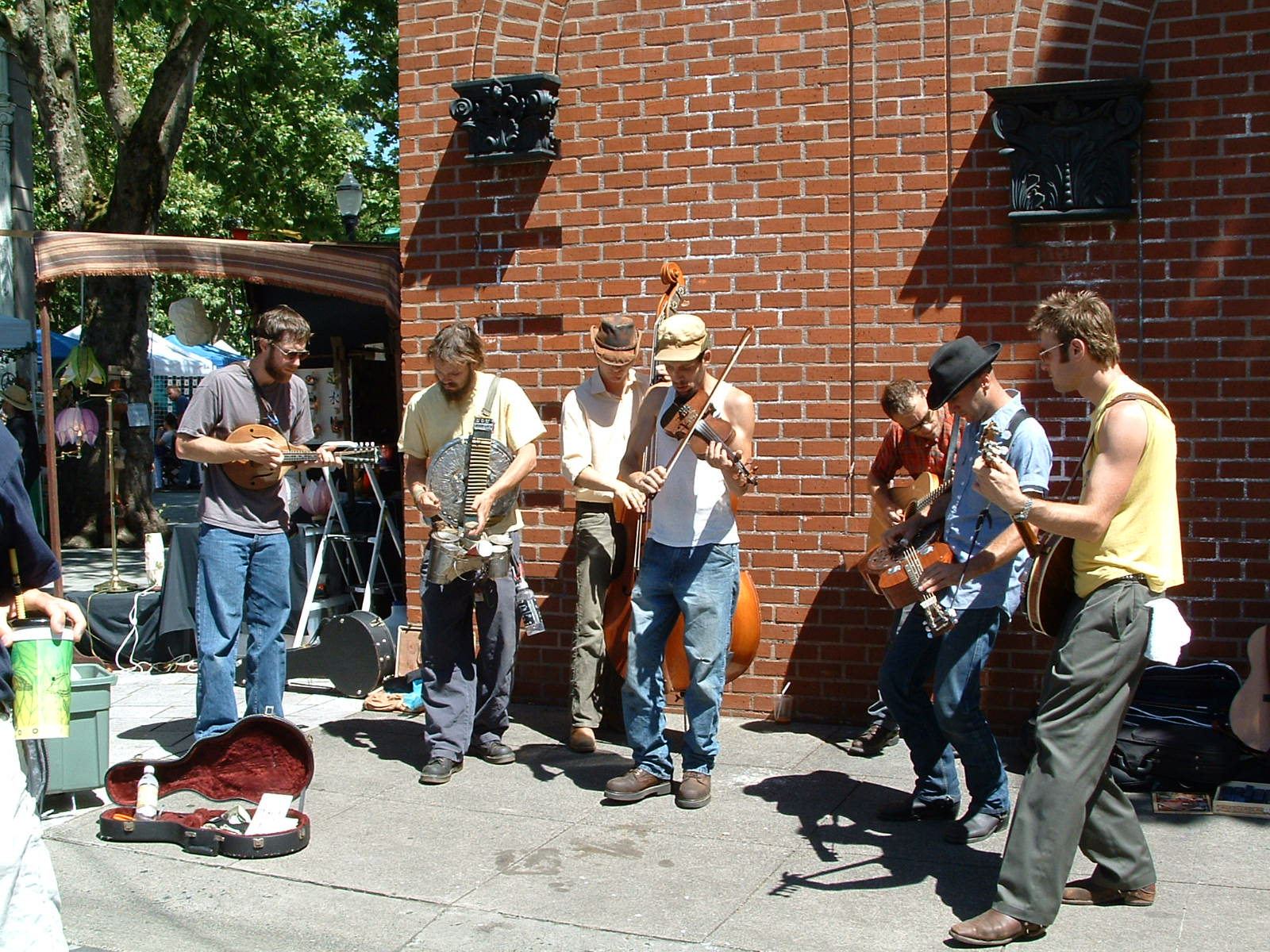
Busking at the 'Saturday Market'
Portland, Oregon
June 2003

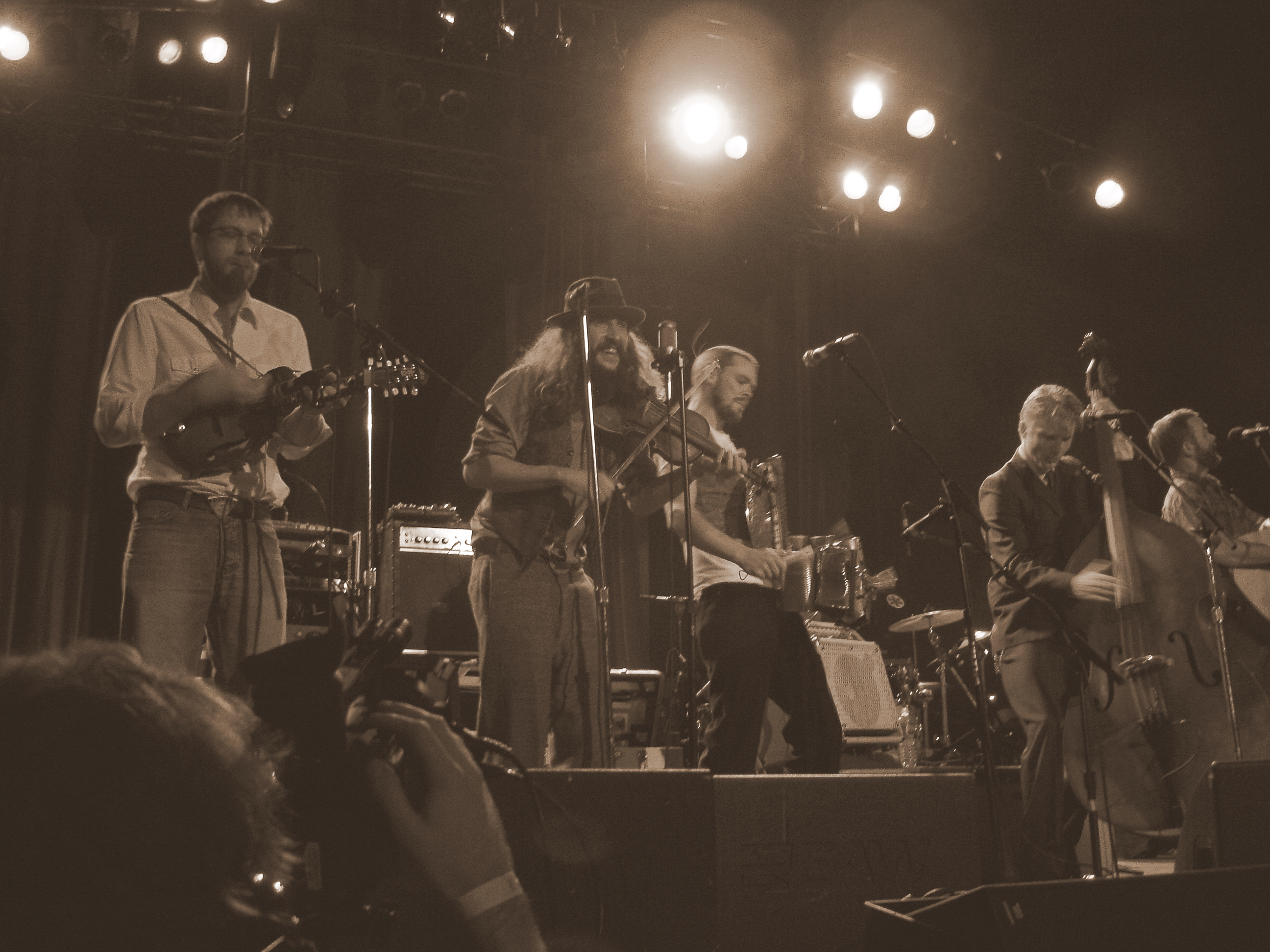
At The Trocadero
Philadelphia
December 31, 2006

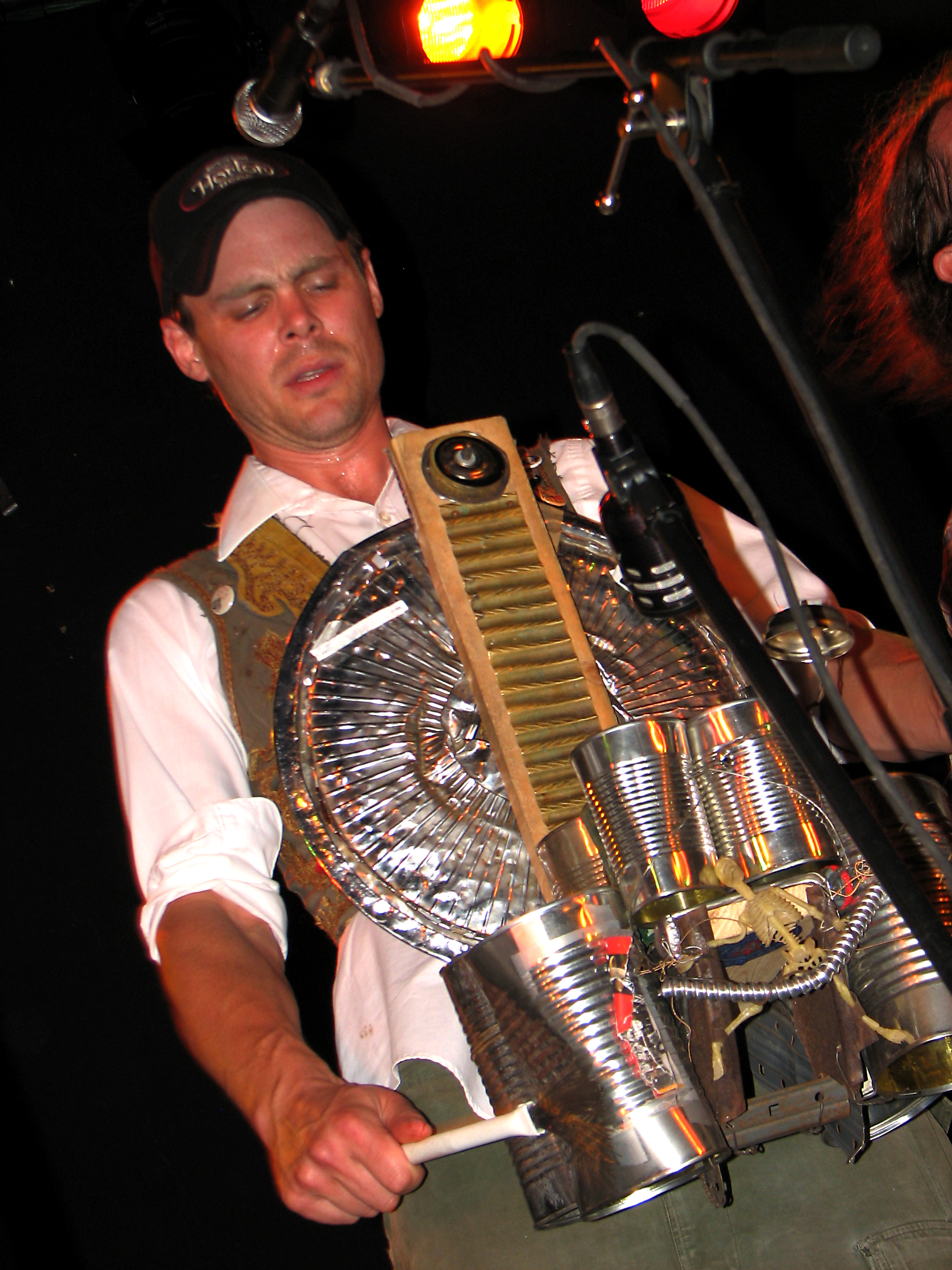
Justin Neuhardt on charismo
Strasburg Theater in Strasburg, Virginia
May 11, 2007

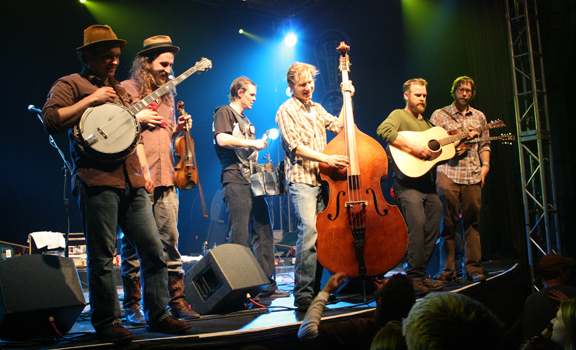
Granada Theater in Dallas
February 24, 2008

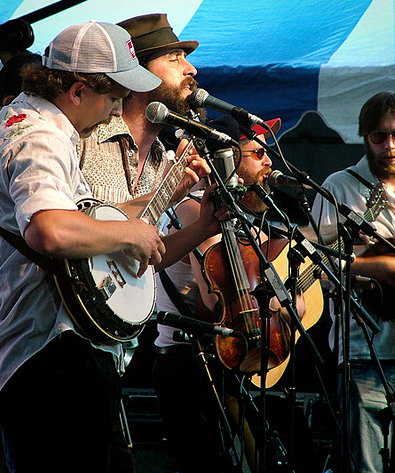
On Legacy Credit Union Stage
Birmingham, Alabama
June 15, 2008

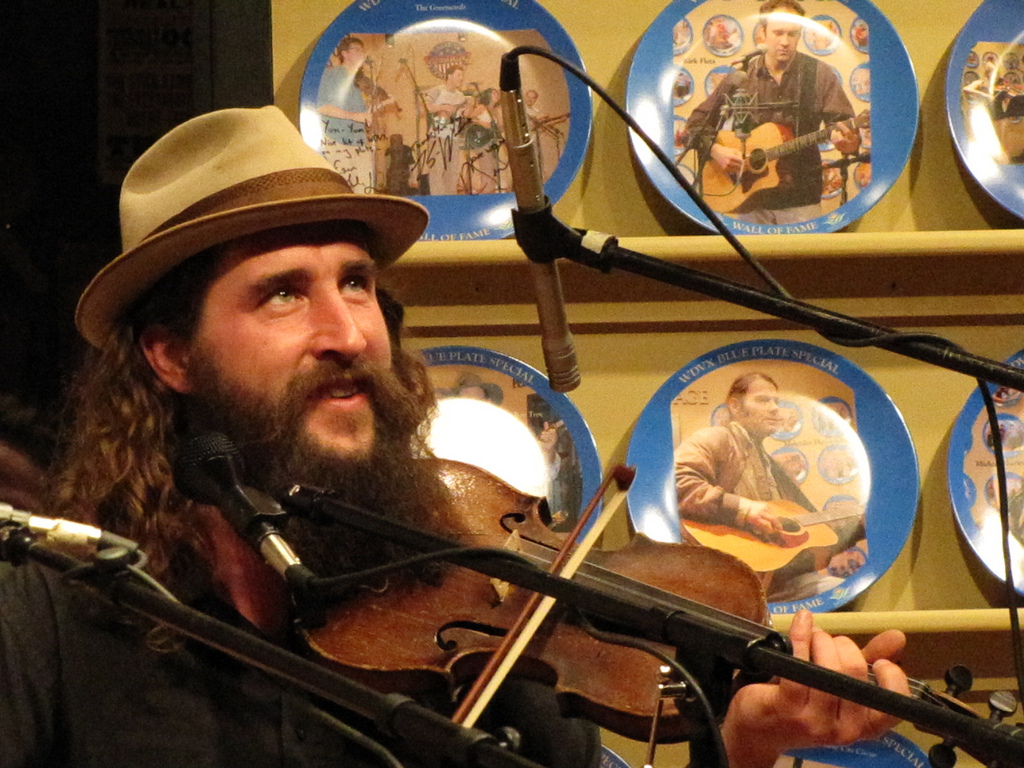
Ferd Lionel 'Four' Moyse, IV plays fiddle at WDVX
Knoxville, Tennessee
February 5, 2010

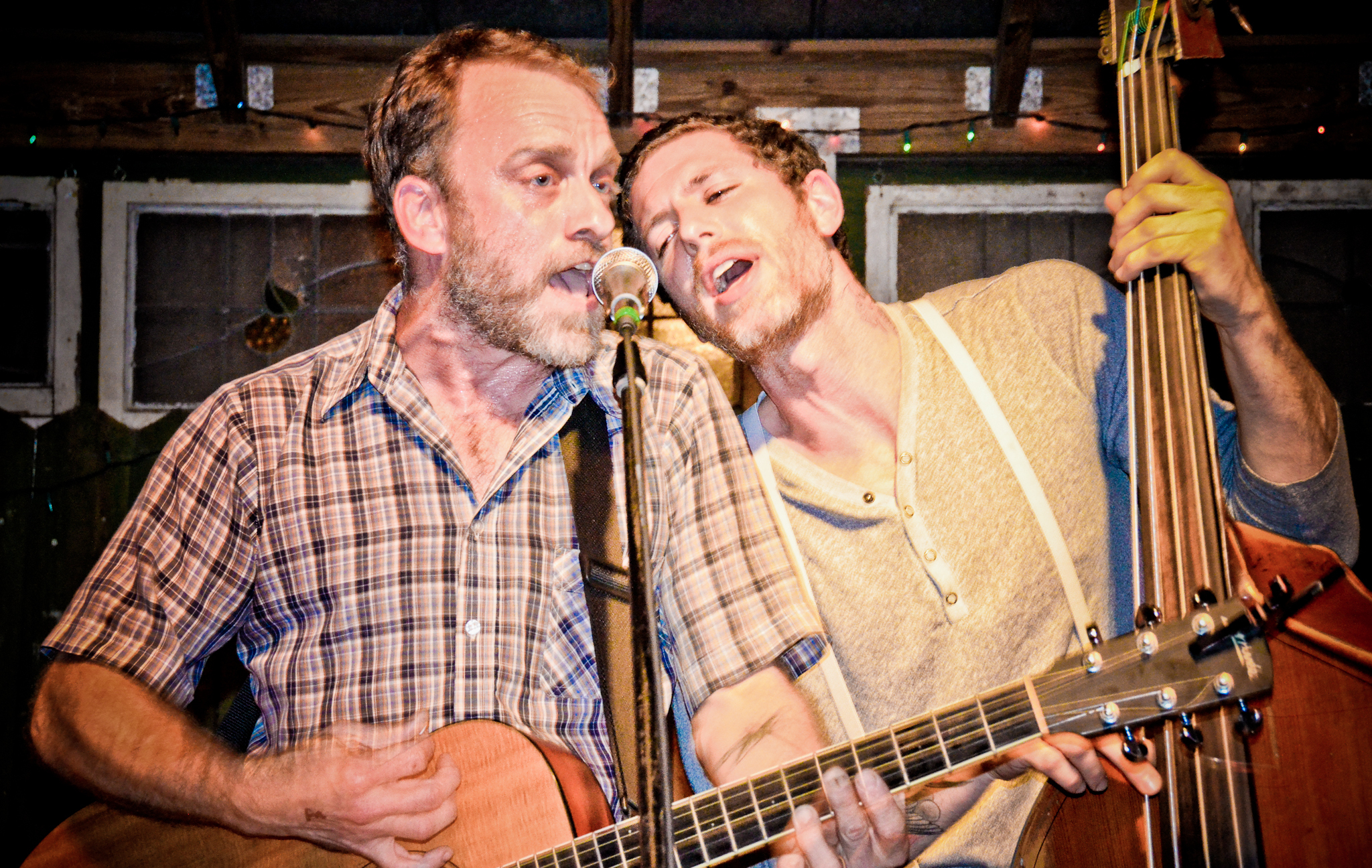
David Sickmen (guitar) Ben Jacobs (bass) at New World Brewery
Ybor City, Tampa, Florida
January 26, 2012

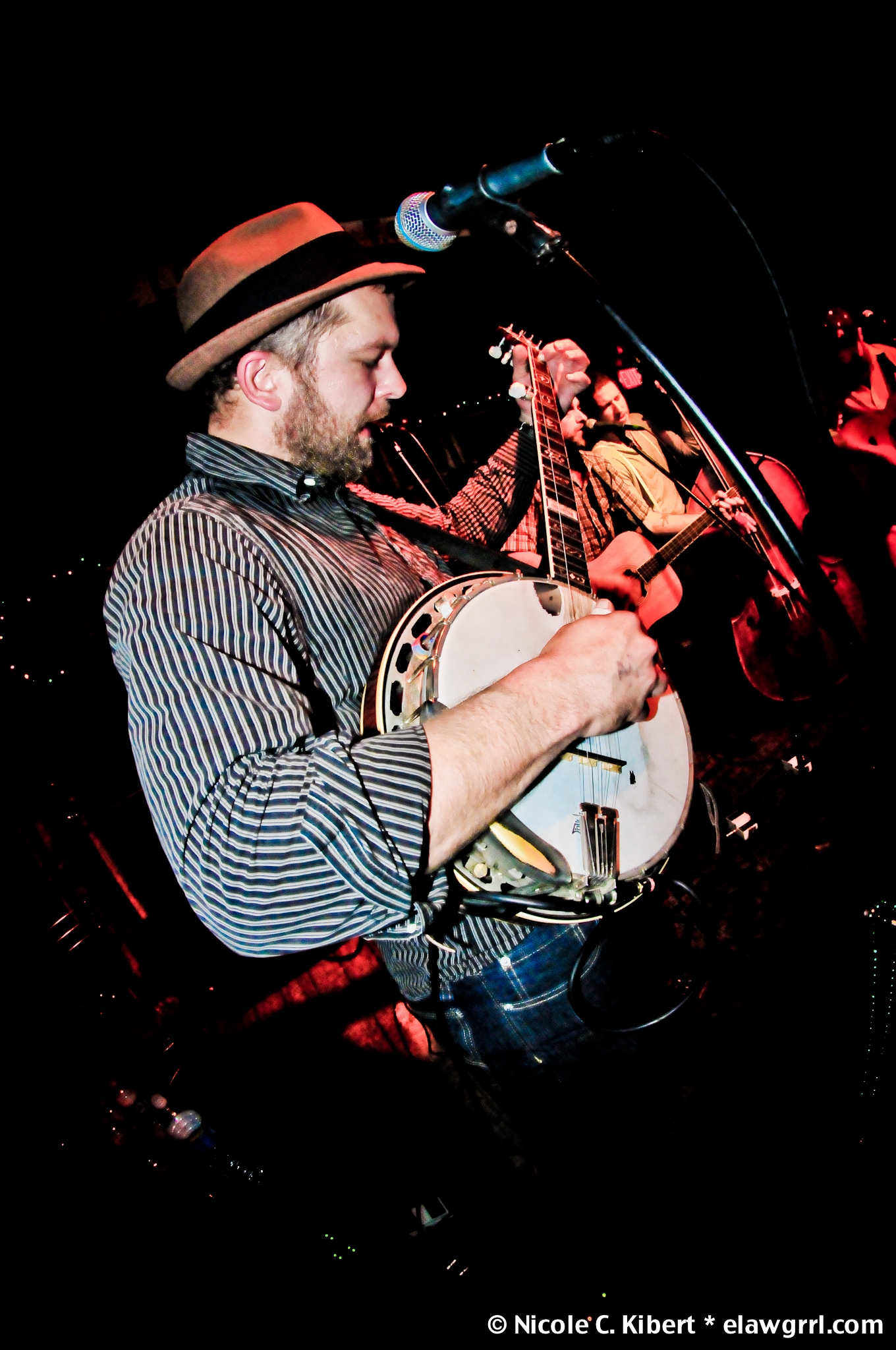
Shawn Galbraith on banjo at New World Brewery
Ybor City, Tampa, Florida
January 26, 2012

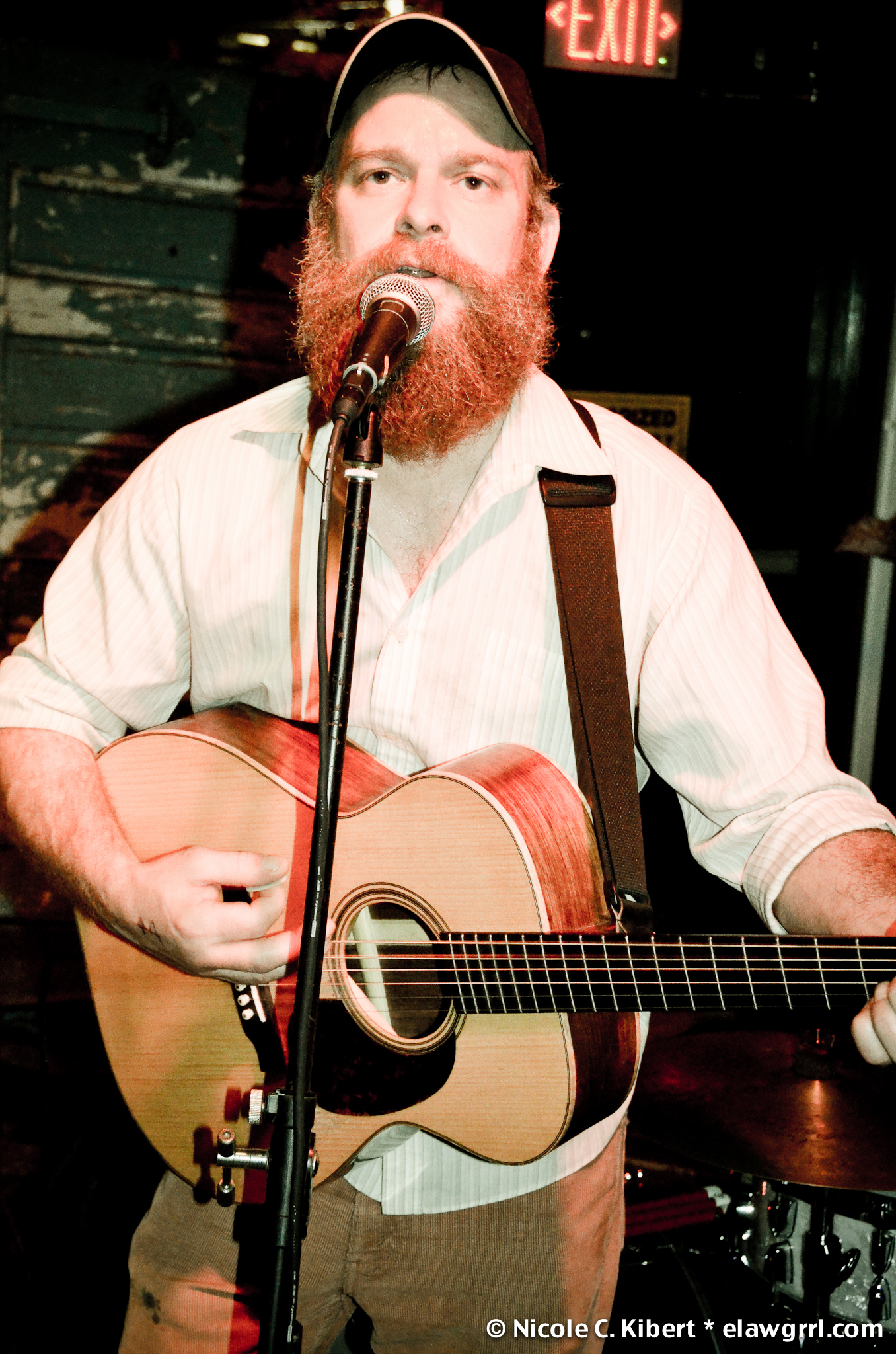
Ward Harrison on guitar at New World Brewery
Ybor City, Tampa, Florida
January 26, 2012

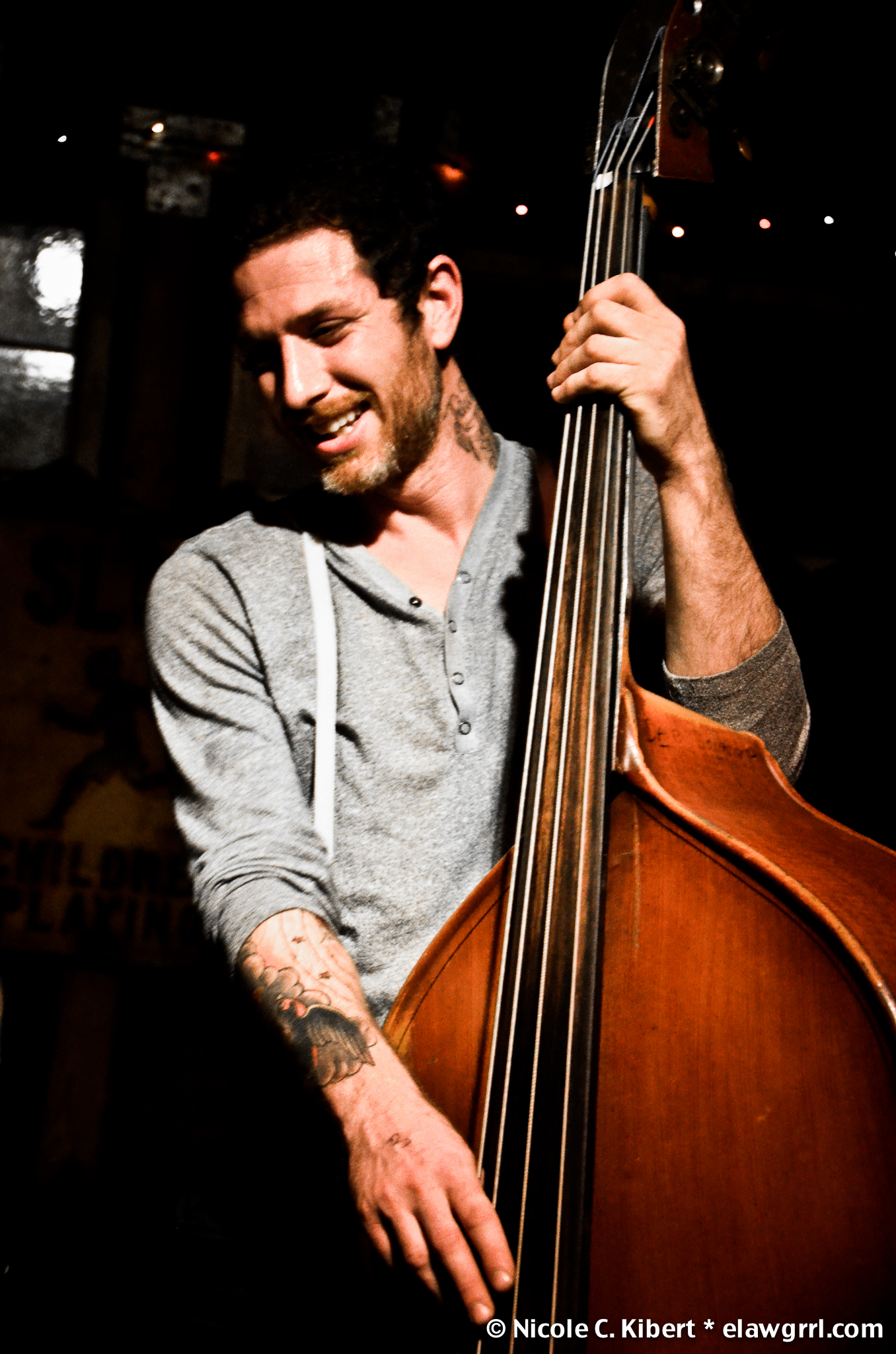
Ben Jacobs on bass at New World Brewery
Ybor City, Tampa, Florida
January 26, 2012

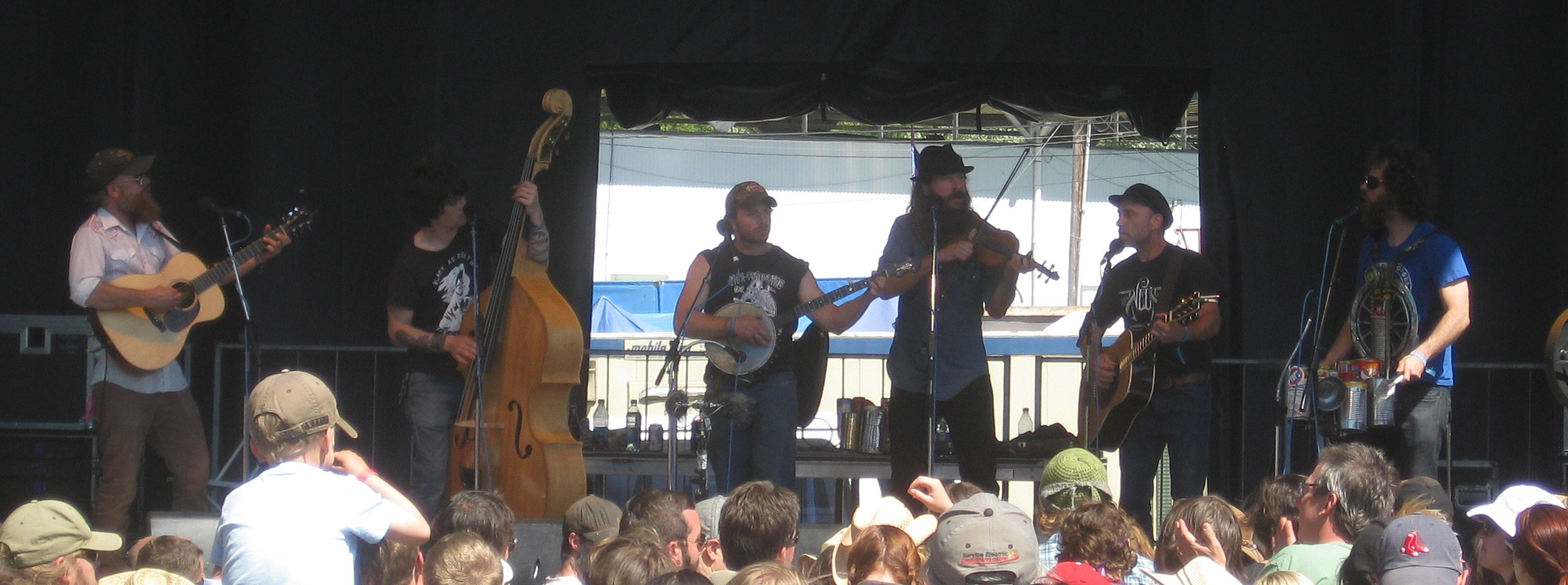
At 6th annual DelFest 2013

== Discography ==
LPs:

- Get Some (2000) Valley Entertainment
- Keep It Simple (2002) Valley Entertainment
- Give It Back (2004) - live (self-produced)
- Love What You Do (2005) Nettwerk Records
- Look Out! (2007) Nettwerk Records
- For The Love Of A Friend. Live in Kinderdijk (2012)
- Till the sweet by and by (2013) Milkcow Records
- Charismo (2016) Free Dirt Records

EPs:

- Who's Lookin' After Me? (2007)
- The Old Sound Of Music, Vol. 1 (2011)
- The Old Sound Of Music, Vol. 2 (2011)
- A Fireproof House of Sunshine (2019)

Music Videos:

- Alabama Shamrock (2006)

=== Video ===
- Hackensaw Boys - Wolves Are Howlin' At My Door Hackensaw Boys recorded live for the Mokum Sessions at Paradiso in Amsterdam, May 8, 2015
- Hackensaw Boys - C'Mon Baby Don't Bet Against Me Hackensaw Boys recorded live on WNRN, Charlottesville, VA June 11, 2014
- Hackensaw Boys - Look Out Dog, Slow Down Train Hackensaw Boys recorded live at the AB Club, Brussels Monday 23 April 2007.
- Hackensaw Boys - Radio (Live) Hackensaw Boys performing "Radio" from their release "Look Out!". Recorded live at the N9 Villa, Eeklo, Belgium Friday September 21, 2007.
- Cannonball - Hackensaw Boys Hackensaw Boys play "Cannonball" at the Lewis Ginter Botanical Gardens, Richmond, Virginia Summer 2006 (double bill with The Avett Brothers).

=== Appearances ===
- Making Old-Time New Again interview with Scott Simon, NPR's Weekend Edition Saturday on April 23, 2016.
- The Hackensaw Boys: Live at KDHX}} in St. Louis, Missouri on 3/3/12.
- Hackensaw Boys - Down South Blues Hackensaw Boys perform "Down South Blues" at WNRN in Charlottesville, Virginia on September 11, 2009.
- Hackensaw Boys - Nashville - 12/02/2006 Knoxville, TN WDVX Hackensaw Boys perform "Nashville" on the WDVX Blue Plate Special show in Knoxville, TN on December 2, 2006.
- Making Their Own Kind of Music interview with Scott Simon, NPR's Weekend Edition Saturday on November 26, 2005.

== See also ==
- Americana music
- Bluegrass music
- Charlottesville, Virginia
- Old-time music
- Nettwerk Records
- Free Dirt Records
- Charlie Louvin
