= Jake Blount =

American folk musician (born 1995)

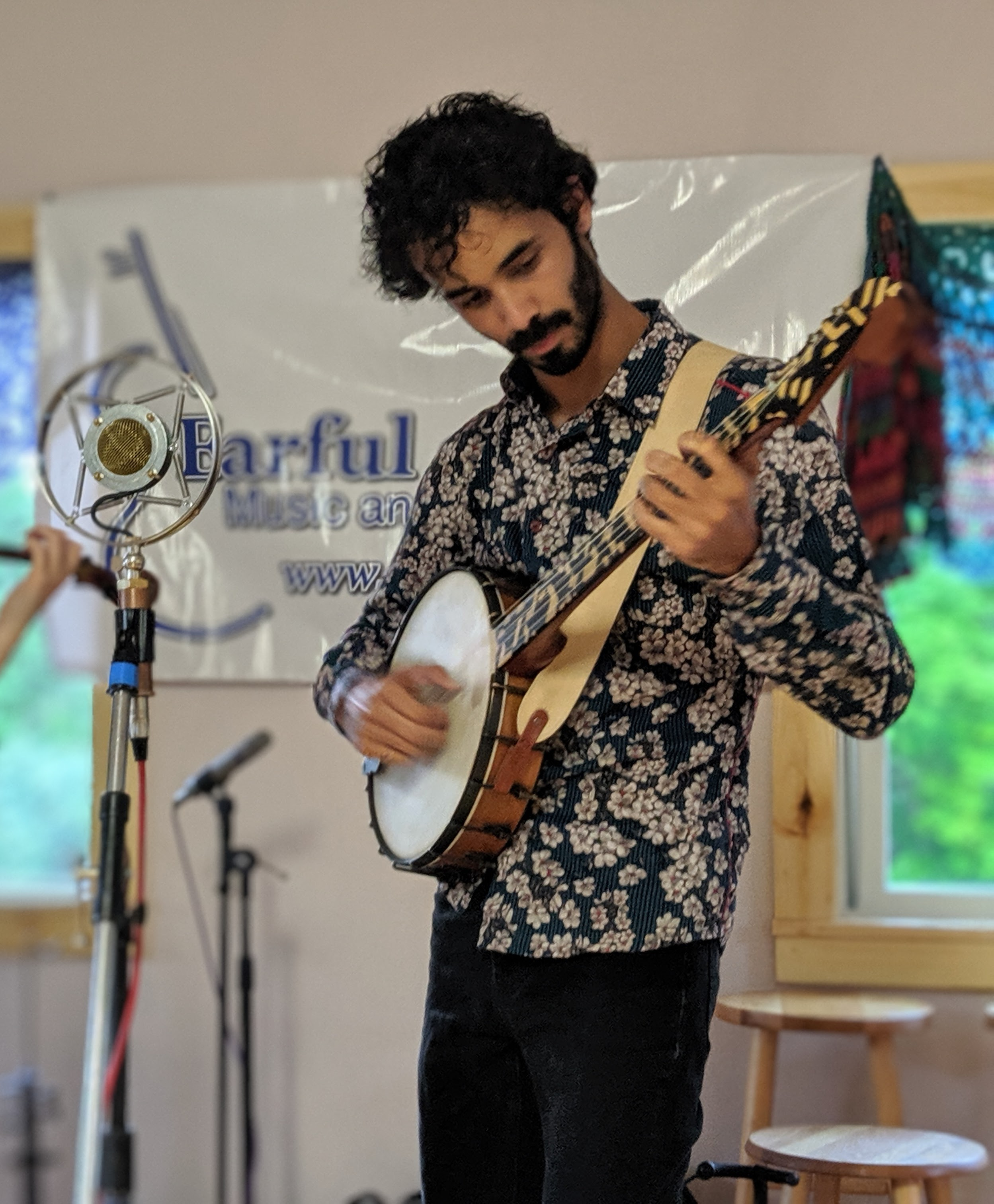
- Jake Blount performs at Earful of Fiddle

Background information
- Born: August 8, 1995 (age 31)
- Origin: Washington, DC, U.S.
- Genres: African-American Traditional, old-time, Afrofuturism
- Instruments: Banjo, fiddle, synthesizer, electric guitar, vocals
- Years active: 2016–present
- Labels: Free Dirt Records, Smithsonian Folkways Recordings
- Website: jakeblount.com

Jake Blount is an American musician and writer based in Providence, Rhode Island. He specializes in the traditional music of African Americans, and his work has been described as "Afrofuturist folklore." Blount, while initially recognized for his skill as an old-time banjo player and fiddler, is a versatile multi-instrumentalist and vocalist who has described his music as "genrequeer." He often performs most of the parts on his recordings, and fluently employs modern instruments and production techniques in his performances of centuries-old repertoire. His work critiques popular notions of genre and linear time, and usually centers themes of social and environmental justice.

Blount's first full-length solo album, Spider Tales, debuted at No. 2 on the Billboard Bluegrass Chart. It received a nomination for Album of the Year at the 2021 International Folk Music Awards, was named Best of the Americas in the Songlines Music Awards in the same year. Shortly after the album's release, Blount was awarded the Steve Martin Banjo Prize. His single "The Man Was Burning" appeared on Spotify's list of the Best Blues Songs of 2022. Blount's 2 most recent albums, The New Faith and Symbiont, were released by Smithsonian Folkways Recordings as part of their African-American Legacy Series. The New Faith was ranked among the best folk and roots releases of 2022 by news outlets including The Guardian, NPR and Rolling Stone.

== Early life ==
Blount was born and raised in Washington, DC. His family is interracial; his mother's family originates in Sweden and Jersey, and his father is Black. Blount and his older sister, Julia, attended Georgetown Day School. His parents, Jeanne Meserve and Jeffrey Blount, were television news professionals. He began learning to play electric guitar at age 12, and played in rock bands with his peers. Influenced by a chance encounter with Megan Jean and the KFB, Blount delved into acoustic music in the latter half of high school.

Blount enrolled at Hamilton College in 2013, where he focused his studies on early African-American folk music. He received his first banjo lessons from Lydia Hamessley, who would become his advisor, and delved into old-time music.

== Career ==
Blount first received widespread recognition within the old-time community in 2016, when his band The Moose Whisperers won the traditional band contest at the Appalachian String Band Music Festival in Clifftop, West Virginia. In mid-2017, Blount graduated from Hamilton College with a B.A. in ethnomusicology, released his debut EP, Reparations, with fiddler Tatiana Hargreaves, and began to tour in earnest. The Moose Whisperers put out their self-titled album in early 2018 and embarked on a release tour in Scandinavia. Upon returning, Blount and Hargreaves opened several shows for Rhiannon Giddens.

Blount and fiddler Libby Weitnauer formed the duo Tui on a tour of Australia in late 2018. They released their album, Pretty Little Mister, in 2019. In the following year, Blount appeared on Radiolab and was selected as a member of the International Bluegrass Music Association's Leadership Bluegrass Class of 2020. He also claimed first place in the banjo contest at the Appalachian String Band Music Festival, competing with tunes from Black banjoists Nathan Frazier and Dink Roberts.

Blount released his debut solo album, Spider Tales, on Free Dirt Records on May 29, 2020. It debuted at No. 2 on the Billboard Bluegrass Chart. The Guardian declared the record "an instant classic," and awarded it five out of five stars. Bandcamp selected it as their Album of the Day, and it received positive coverage from NPR, Rolling Stone, Billboard and more. In an interview with Country Queer, Blount stated that the album "came out of a desire to tease out the sort of anger and demands for justice and resentment that I see simmering in the black traditional music canon throughout history," and was intended to contradict preconceived notions about Black folk music. The album was named among the best releases of 2022 by publications including NPR, Bandcamp Daily, and The New Yorker.

Blount received the Steve Martin Banjo Prize shortly after the release of Spider Tales. He was prominently featured on NPR's Weekend Edition in a segment regarding traditional musicians and their efforts to address racism within the canon, and was interviewed by Hunter Kelly for Apple Music's Proud Radio show. The success of Spider Tales catapulted Blount onto the mainstream Americana touring circuit, leading to performances at venues including the Kennedy Center and the Newport Folk Festival.

In early 2022, Blount released the single "The Man Was Burning" on Free Dirt Records. The song received positive coverage from NPR, and appeared on Spotify's list of the Best Blues Songs of 2022.

Later that year, Blount made his Smithsonian Folkways debut with the Afrofuturist concept album The New Faith. The record, which incorporates rap, looping, digital processing and a wider array of instrumentation than his prior recorded works, represents a significant sonic and conceptual progression for Blount. While Blount has said that he views all his work as intrinsically Afrofuturist, The New Faith engages with Afrofuturism more explicitly. The album is set in the future, and depicts a religious ceremony held by descendants of Black climate refugees. It is composed entirely of rearranged traditional folk songs, some of which date back to the seventeenth century. NPR, The Guardian, Rolling Stone and others named it among the best roots and folk releases of 2022.

Blount began 2023 with a performance at NPR's Tiny Desk and a nomination for Artist of the Year at the International Folk Music Awards. In 2024, he released symbiont in collaboration with Mali Obomsawin, and later appeared in the country music documentary Rebel Country.

== Discography ==
=== Solo Studio albums ===
Title	Album details	Peak chart positions
Reparations (EP)	Label: Self-released; Release date: July 28, 2017	None
Spider Tales	Label: Free Dirt Records; Release date: May 29, 2020	US Bluegrass: No. 2
The New Faith	Label: Smithsonian Folkways; Release date: September 23, 2022	NACC Folk Chart: #1 FAI Folk Chart: #6
symbiont	Label: Smithsonian Folkways; Release date: September 27, 2024	
Single-Footing Horse	Label: ?; Release date: September 18, 2026	

=== As Tui ===
- Pretty Little Mister (2019)

=== As The Moose Whisperers ===
- The Moose Whisperers (2018)

== Singles ==
Title	Year
"The Man Was Burning"	2022
