= Che Apalache =

Argentinian-American string band

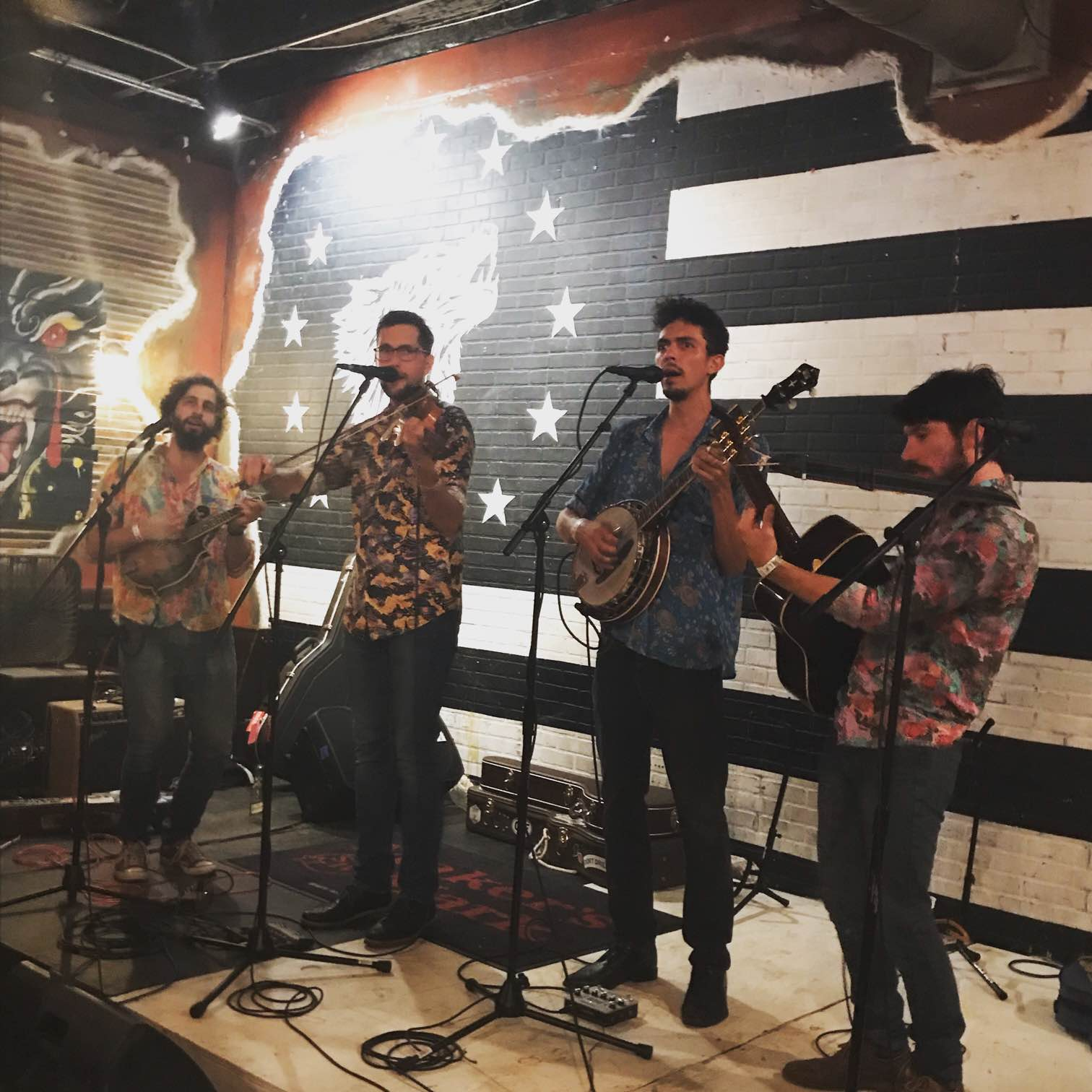
- Che Apalache performing in Nashville, TN

Background information
- Origin: Buenos Aires, Argentina
- Genres: Bluegrass, Americana, Latin
- Instruments: acoustic guitar, banjo, fiddle, mandolin
- Label: Free Dirt Records
- Members: Joe Troop (fiddle, vocals), Pau Barjau (banjo, vocals), Martín Bobrik (mandolin, vocals), Franco Martino (guitar, vocals)
- Website: www.cheapalache.com

Che Apalache was an Argentinian-American string band based in Buenos Aires, Argentina. Their style has attracted fans such as banjoist Béla Fleck who produced their Grammy-nominated album Rearrange My Heart.

== Biography ==
Che Apalache was formed in Buenos Aires in 2013. After living abroad in a number of countries including Spain and Japan, Joe Troop moved to Argentina in 2010 to teach bluegrass music. Troop grew up in Winston-Salem in the Piedmont region of North Carolina and was inspired to play bluegrass after hearing a Doc Watson concert as a child. In Argentina, he helped develop the small local scene and eventually formed Che Apalache with some of his best students. Troop notes that for their first five years they played only Appalachian music, and "that seemed amazing avant-garde to have a bluegrass band in the city of Buenos Aires." However, they later began to incorporate some of the Latin styles they had grown up with in Argentina and Mexico. They initially played with an upright bass but eventually settled on the lineup of Martin Bobrik and Franco Martino, from Buenos Aires, and Pau Barjau, from Mexico.

In 2017 they received assistance from the Virginia Folklife Program and PineCone, the Piedmont Council of Traditional Music, to tour the United States. From February to May of that year they recorded an album in Argentina to prepare for their first US tour. That summer they won the prestigious Clifftop old-time music contest in the neo-traditional band category.

The band's name is composed of "Che", a casual greeting ('buddy' or 'man' in Spanish) and "Apalache", the Spanish word for Appalachia.

== Influences ==
The band was known for the many influences they incorporated including: Uruguayan murga, candombe, flamenco, mountain gospel, Spanish Sephardic Jewish music, and classic bluegrass in the style of the Stanley Brothers. They sing in English, Spanish, and Japanese. They are also notable for their intricate percussive rhythms, often played right on their instruments, and other extended techniques not traditionally used in acoustic music. Their uncommon style caught the attention of Bela Fleck who decided to produce their second album, Rearrange My Heart, in his home studio. "These guys are just so unique and fascinating that it was impossible for me to say no," Fleck said. "Music should be about human expression and these guys are expressing it in spades." The album was released on August 9, 2019, on Free Dirt Records.

Rolling Stone Country notes "the group merges cultures to smash through the boundaries often set up around many types of folk music." NPR's "All Things Considered" called the band "a big hit." NPR's Alt.Latino column praised the "brilliant mash up of bluegrass and various form of Latin music. They went on, "From beginning to end, Rearrange My Heart is a Must Hear."

Che Apalache was forced to disband in 2020, due to the COVID-19 pandemic.

== Discography ==
- Rearrange My Heart (2019), Free Dirt Records
- Latin Grass (2017), self-released
