= Free Dirt Records =

Independent record label

- Founded: 2006
- Founder: John Smith, Erica Haskell
- Distributors: AMPED Distribution (US), MNRK Music Group
- Genre: Folk, American roots, country
- Country of origin: U.S.
- Location: Washington, DC
- Official website: www.freedirt.net

Free Dirt Records is an American independent record label and label services company founded in 2006 by John Smith and Erica Haskell that releases folk and roots music. The label's releases have received three Grammy nominations.

== History ==
John Smith met Erica Haskell when Haskell interned at Smithsonian Folkways in 2000. Later while Haskell was attending graduate school in ethnomusicology they collaborated on a box set of spoken word introductions paired with original songs by anarchist folk musician and storyteller Utah Phillips before founding Free Dirt Records in 2006. The label's first official release was by the traditional Bosnian group Mostar Sevdah Reunion. Smith and Haskell ventured to create a label where they could work with young artists making traditionally rooted music and showcase often overlooked material like spoken word. Since 2006, the label has released music by Pokey LaFarge, Anna & Elizabeth, Hackensaw Boys, Julian Lage & Chris Eldridge (Grammy-nominated), Cahalen Morrison, Che Apalache (Grammy-nominated), Dori Freeman,

== Roster ==
- Anna & Elizabeth
- Che Apalache
- Dori Freeman
- The Hackensaw Boys
- Hazel Dickens & Alice Gerrard
- Mat Callahan & Yvonne Moore
- Pokey LaFarge
- Jake Blount
- Joe Troop
- JP Harris
- Julian Lage & Chris Eldridge
- Kaia Kater
- Utah Phillips
- Rachel Baiman
- The Two Man Gentlemen Band

== See also ==
- List of record labels
