= Patient-controlled analgesia =

Administration of pain relief medication by a patient

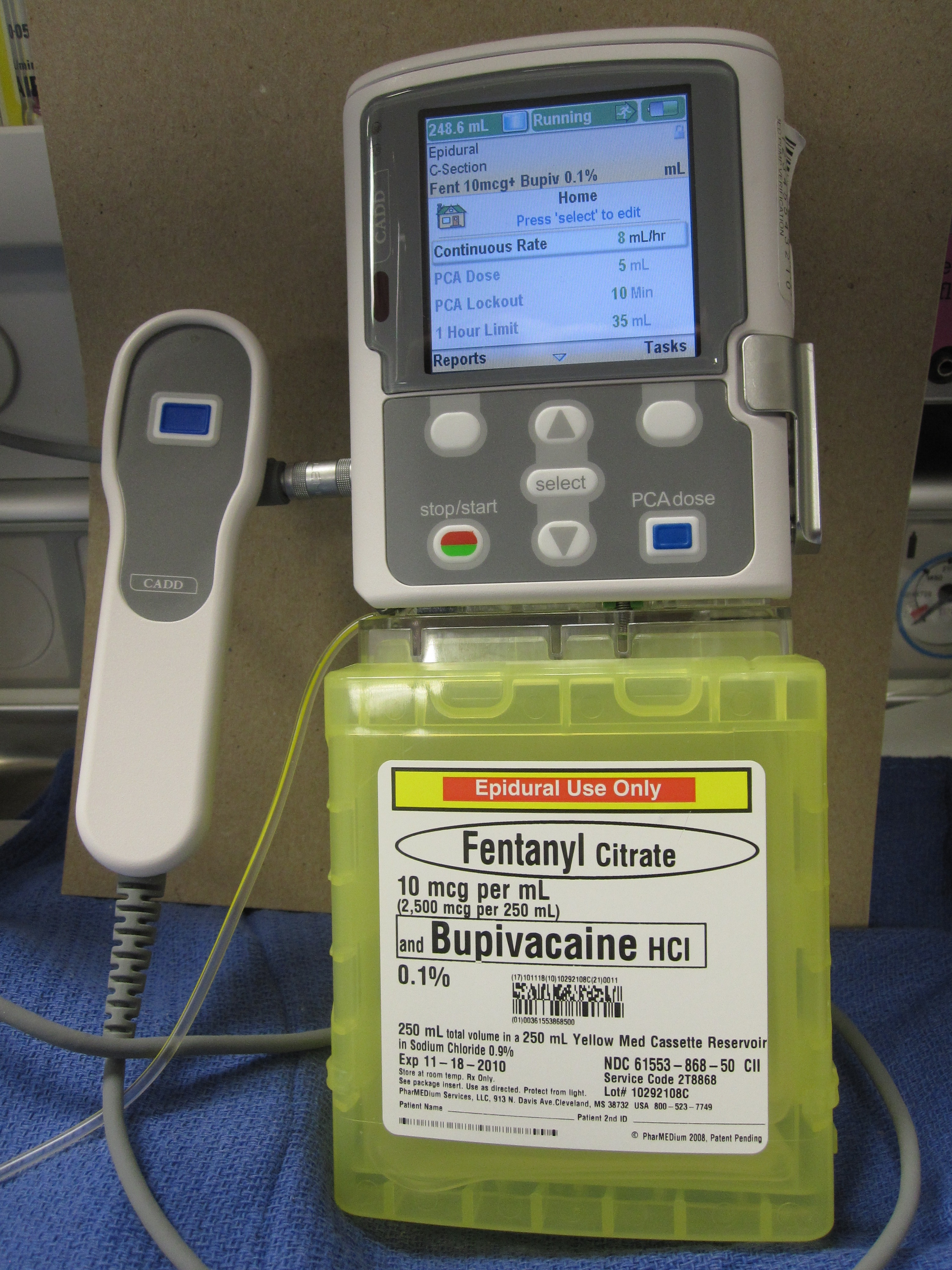
- A patient-controlled analgesia infusion pump, configured for epidural administration of fentanyl and bupivacaine for postoperative analgesia
- MeSH: D016058

Patient-controlled analgesia (PCA) is any method of allowing a person in pain to administer their own pain relief. The infusion is programmable by the prescriber. If it is programmed and functioning as intended, the machine is unlikely to deliver an overdose of medication. Providers must always observe the first administration of any PCA medication which has not already been administered by the provider to respond to allergic reactions.

== Routes of administration ==
=== Oral ===
The most common form of patient-controlled analgesia is self-administration of oral over-the-counter or prescription painkillers. For example, if a headache does not resolve with a small dose of an oral analgesic, more may be taken. As pain is a combination of tissue damage and emotional state, being in control means reducing the emotional component of pain.

=== Intravenous ===
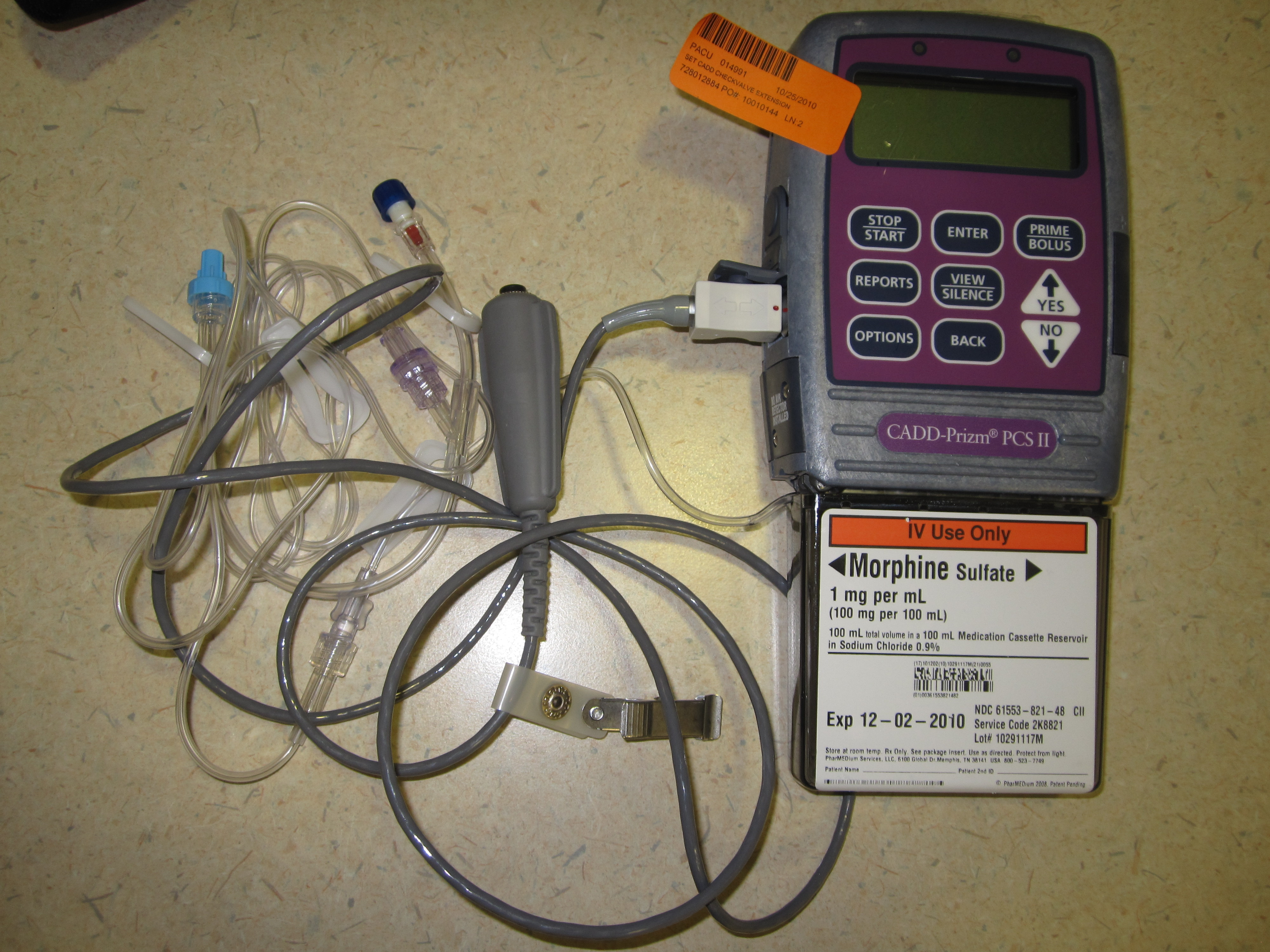
A patient-controlled analgesia infusion pump, configured for intravenous administration of morphine for postoperative analgesia

In a hospital setting, an intravenous PCA (IV PCA) refers to an electronically controlled infusion pump that delivers an amount of analgesic when the patient presses a button. IV PCA can be used for both acute and chronic pain patients. It is commonly used for post-operative pain management, and for end-stage cancer patients.

Narcotics are the most common analgesics administered through IV PCAs. It is important for caregivers to monitor patients for the first two to twenty-four hours to ensure they are using the device properly.

With an IV PCA the patient is protected from overdose by the caregiver programming the PCA to deliver a dose at frequent set intervals. If the patient presses the button sooner than the prescribed intake pressing the button does not operate the PCA. (The PCA can be set to emit a beep telling the patient a dose was NOT delivered). The inability of an obtunded patient to push the button is also considered an inherent safety feature of PCA.

=== Epidural ===
Patient-controlled epidural analgesia (PCEA) is a related term describing the patient-controlled administration of analgesic medicine in the epidural space, by way of intermittent boluses or infusion pumps. This can be used by women in labour, terminally ill cancer patients or to manage post-operative pain.

=== Inhaled ===
In 1968, Robert Wexler of Abbott Laboratories developed the Analgizer, a disposable inhaler that allowed the self-administration of methoxyflurane vapor in air for analgesia. The Analgizer consisted of a polyethylene cylinder 5 inches long and 1 inch in diameter with a 1 inch long mouthpiece. The device contained a rolled wick of polypropylene felt which held 15 milliliters of methoxyflurane. Because of the simplicity of the Analgizer and the pharmacological characteristics of methoxyflurane, it was easy for patients to self-administer the drug and rapidly achieve a level of conscious analgesia which could be maintained and adjusted as necessary over a period of time lasting from a few minutes to several hours. The 15 milliliter supply of methoxyflurane would typically last for two to three hours, during which time the user would often be partly amnesic to the sense of pain; the device could be refilled if necessary. The Analgizer was found to be safe, effective, and simple to administer in obstetric patients during childbirth, as well as for patients with bone fractures and joint dislocations, and for dressing changes on burn patients. When used for labor analgesia, the Analgizer allows labor to progress normally and with no apparent adverse effect on Apgar scores. All vital signs remain normal in obstetric patients, newborns, and injured patients. The Analgizer was widely utilized for analgesia and sedation until the early 1970s, in a manner that foreshadowed the patient-controlled analgesia infusion pumps of today. The Analgizer inhaler was withdrawn in 1974, but use of methoxyflurane as a sedative and analgesic continues in Australia and New Zealand in the form of the Penthrox inhaler.

=== Nasal ===
Patient Controlled Intranasal Analgesia (PCINA or Nasal PCA) refers to PCA devices in a Nasal spray form with inbuilt features to control the number of sprays that can be delivered in a fixed time period.

=== Transdermal ===
Transdermal PCA using iontophoretic technology are also available. The most advanced ones are used for administration of opioids such as fentanyl. An adhesive is applied to the intact hairless skin, while a small electric current allows the ionized drug to cross the stratum corneum to deliver the analgesic dose upon the device being triggered by the patient.

== Advantages and disadvantages ==
Advantages of patient-controlled analgesia include self-delivery of pain medication, faster alleviation of pain because the patient can address pain with medication, and dosage monitoring by medical staff (dosage can be increased or decreased depending on need). With a PCA the patient spends less time in pain and as a corollary to this, patients tend to use less medication than in cases in which medication is given according to a set schedule or on a timer.

Disadvantages include the possibility that a patient will use the pain medication non-medically, self-administering the narcotic for its euphoric properties even though the patient's pain is sufficiently controlled. If a PCA device is not programmed properly for the patient this can result in an under-dose or overdose in a medicine. The system may also be inappropriate for certain individuals, for example patients with learning difficulties or confusion. Also, patients with poor manual dexterity may be unable to press the buttons as would those who are critically ill. PCA may not be appropriate for younger patients.

== History ==
The PCA pump was developed and introduced by Philip H. Sechzer in the late 1960s and described in 1971.
