= Economy Candy =

Candy store in New York City founded 1937

Coordinates: 40°43′12″N 73°59′1″W

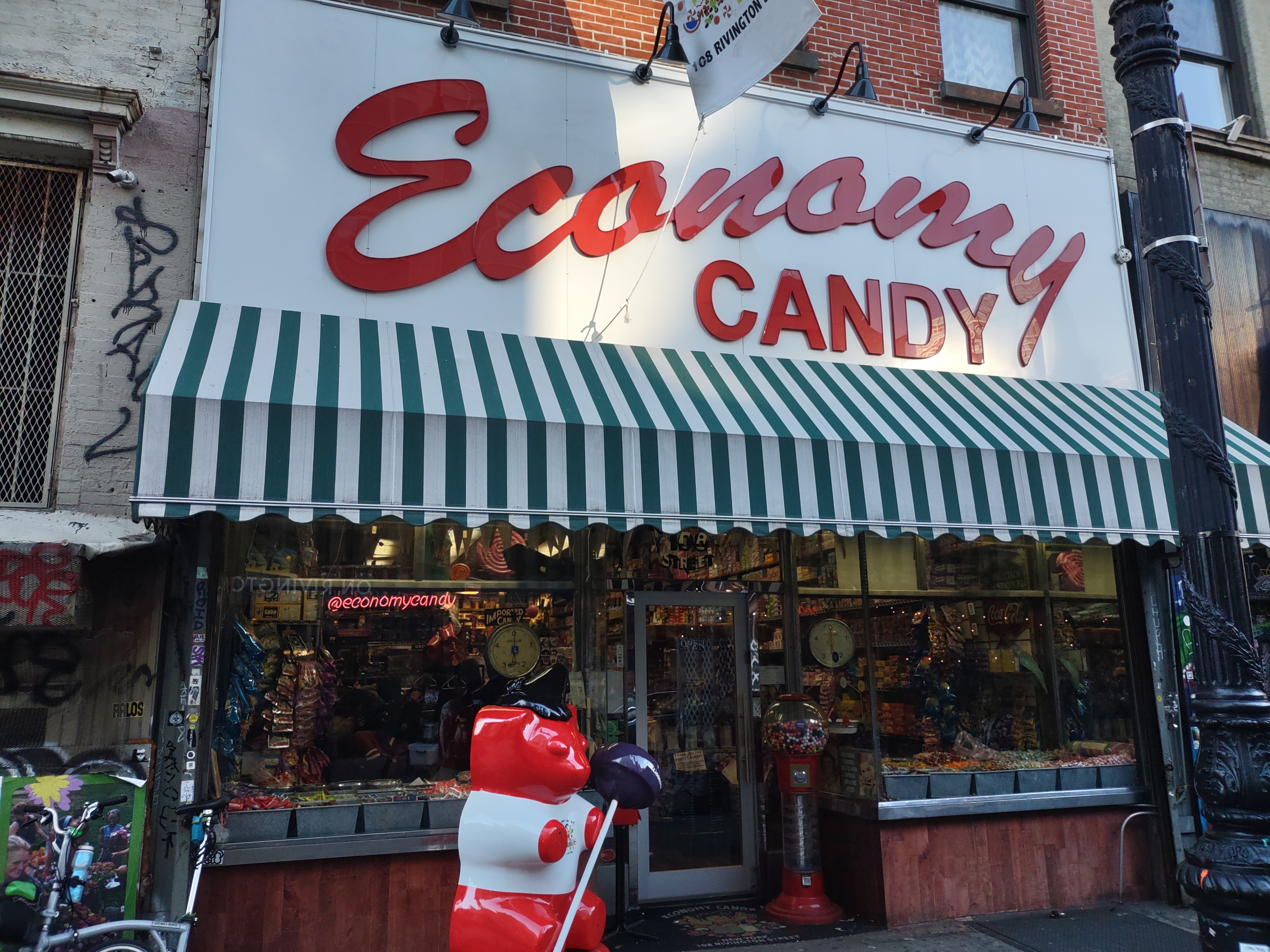
- Industry: Confectionery sales
- Founded: 1937; 89 years ago in New York City, New York, United States
- Headquarters: United States
- Area served: United States
- Products: Candies
- Website: https://economycandy.com/

Economy Candy is a family-owned candy store on the Lower East Side of Manhattan in New York City which stocks numerous branded candies, including older brands which are difficult to find elsewhere. It was established in 1937. The store celebrated its 85th anniversary with a Block party in July 2022. In February 2023, the store announced its first expansion location in the Chelsea Market.

Serious Eats described Economy Candy as the craziest and best candy store in New York City.

The Cohen family, who owns the store also has a history of themselves working at the store.
