= Jefferson Blues Magazine =

Swedish blues music magazine

Jefferson Blues Magazine is a Swedish blues magazine. It is published by the Swedish Blues Association (SBA). The first issue was published in the spring 1968, which makes it the oldest blues magazine still in print in the world. The Finnish Blues News is almost as old as Jefferson, as is the French Soul Bag, which covers blues and related genres.
