= Lilli Lewis =

American singer/songwriter

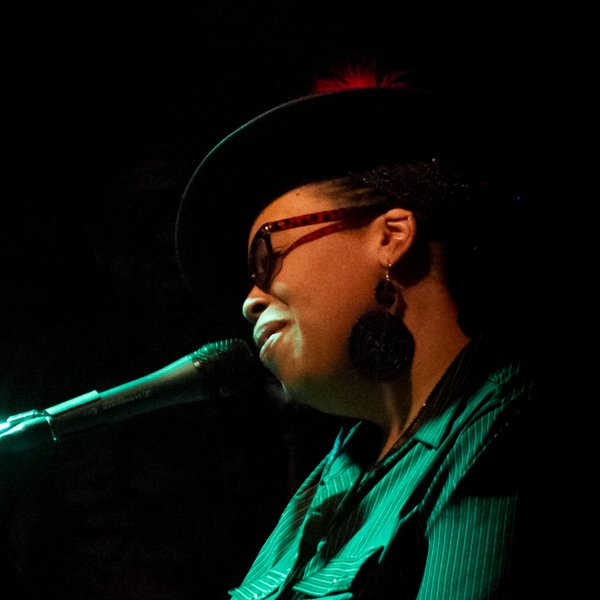

Background information
- Born: Athens, Georgia
- Genres: Folk; Americana
- Occupation: Singer-songwriter
- Instruments: Vocals; Piano
- Years active: 2009–present

Lilli Lewis is an American folk and Americana singer, songwriter, and pianist based in New Orleans, Louisiana. She is sometimes known as the "Folk Rock Diva".

== Musical career ==
Lewis is originally from Athens, Georgia. She released her first album Out from Yonder in 2008. She was first known as the "Folk Rock Diva" in the folk rock band The Shiz, which she founded with her wife Liz Hogan in 2009. She has also released records backed by a big band containing several notable New Orleans musicians, known as the Lilli Lewis Project. Their album We Belong received positive reviews from the jazz press in 2019. The album My American Heart received media attention in 2020 with one reviewer comparing Lewis to opera singer Jessye Norman.

In 2020, Lewis co-wrote and co-produced "Mask Up! COVID Down!" as part of Louisiana Red Hot Records' efforts for public health in the COVID-19 pandemic. She also contributed a set of twelve arias for a cycle entitled Cura Personalis, commissioned by the Opera Workshop at Loyola University.

In 2021, Lewis released her album Americana on Louisiana Red Hot Records. NPR Music chose it as a Top 10 Album of the week. NPR Morning Edition also interviewed her in a segment on black musicians and activists forging a new path.

Lewis' album Americana was pulled from streaming service Spotify after the track "A Healing Inside" featuring the original Lady A was flagged by the band formerly known as Lady Antebellum, and was restored to the service after days. Rolling Stone noted the controversy, and reviewed Lewis' "Copper John" as one of its Songs You Need to Know.

== Activism ==
Lewis has spoken out on racial, gender, and LGBTQ equity in Americana music in her role as Vice President and head of A&R at Louisiana Red Hot Records, with panels covered by Rolling Stone and American Songwriter. She told Nashville Scene: "Country and Americana share space with the profound legacies of entrepreneurial female artists like Ma Rainey and Bessie Smith."

== Albums ==
- Out from Yonder (2008)
- Very Small Things (2009)
- The Promised Lands: Songs of the Sacred South (2011)
- Orange Music (2017)
- The Henderson Sessions (2018 - Louisiana Red Hot Records)
- We Belong (The Lilli Lewis Project, 2019 - Louisiana Red Hot Records)
- My American Heart + The Blue EP (2020 - Louisiana Red Hot Records)
- Americana (2021 - Louisiana Red Hot Records)
- All Is Forgiven (2023 - Righteous Babe Records)
