= Midnight ramble =

Segregation-era film screenings for African Americans

A midnight ramble was a segregation-era midnight showing of films for an African American audience, often in a cinema where, under Jim Crow laws they would never have been admitted at other times. The films shown were often from among the over 500 films that were made between 1910 and 1950 in the United States with black producers, writers, actors and directors. Film archivist Pearl Bowser said these films "were important to Black audiences because it provided them with images of themselves that they didn't see in the regular cinema".

Oscar Micheauxs films were popular, and they starred all Black casts and were produced by Black filmmakers. He was the first director to make feature length films, many of which explored subjects that were considered "taboo" at the time, like; alcoholism, crime, class conflict, interracial relationships, racism and lynchings.

== See also ==
- Oscar Micheaux's filmography
- Race films
