= Tyler Childers discography =

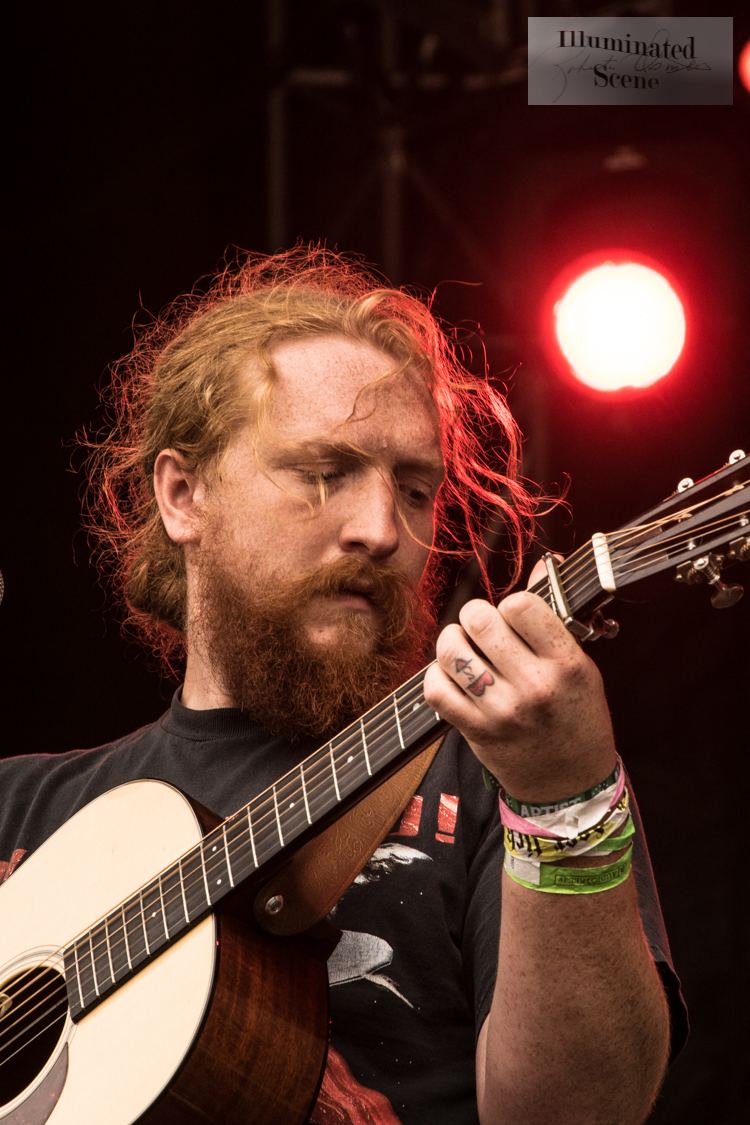
- Tyler Childers in 2018.
- Studio albums: 7
- EPs: 3
- Singles: 6
- Music videos: 6

American country music singer Tyler Childers has released seven studio albums, three extended plays, and six singles. He debuted in 2011 with the album Bottles and Bibles through his own label Hickman Holler. The follow-up, 2017's Purgatory, was his most commercially successful, receiving a platinum certification from the Recording Industry Association of America (RIAA). While not a single, the track "Feathered Indians" from this album is his highest-certified, at double platinum. He has charted four times on the Billboard Hot Country Songs charts with the single "All Your'n" as well as three album tracks.

== Studio albums ==
List of studio albums, with selected details, peak chart positions, sales and certifications shown
Title	Album details	Peak chart positions						Sales	Certifications
Title	Album details	US	US Country	US Indie	US Folk	CAN	UK Country	Sales	Certifications
Bottles and Bibles	Release date: October 11, 2011; Label: Tyler Childers	—	—	—	—	—	—		
Purgatory	Release date: August 4, 2017; Label: Hickman Holler	71	9	3	2	78	—	US: 82,900	RIAA: Platinum; MC: Platinum
Country Squire	Release date: August 2, 2019; Label: Hickman Holler	12	1	—	1	86	1	US: 65,400	RIAA: Platinum; MC: Gold
Long Violent History	Release date: September 18, 2020; Label: Hickman Holler	45	6	—	1	—	—		
Can I Take My Hounds to Heaven?	Release date: September 30, 2022; Label: Hickman Holler, RCA	8	3	—	—	—	—	US: 27,000	
Rustin' in the Rain	Release date: September 8, 2023; Label: Hickman Holler, RCA	10	4	—	2	63	9		
Snipe Hunter	Release date: July 25, 2025; Label: Hickman Holler, RCA	7	2	—	1	38	—	US: 27,000	
"—" denotes releases that did not chart

== EPs ==
List of EPs, with selected details and peak chart positions shown
Title	Album details	Peak chart positions			Certifications
Title	Album details	US	US Heat	US Indie	Certifications
Live on Red Barn Radio	Release date: October 24, 2013; Label: Tyler Childers & the Highwall	—	—	—	
Live on Red Barn Radio II	Release date: April 24, 2014; Label: Tyler Childers & the Highwall	—	—	—	
Live on Red Barn Radio I & II (rerelease of 2 EPs as one)	Release date: June 29, 2018; Label: Hickman Holler	196	5	14	RIAA: Gold
Reimagined	Release date: October 18, 2019; Label: Hickman Holler	—	—	—	
"—" denotes releases that did not chart

== Singles ==
List of singles, with year released, selected peak chart positions, sales, certifications and album name shown
Year	Title	Peak chart positions								Sales	Certifications	Album
Year	Title	US	US Country	US Country Airplay	US AAA	CAN	CAN Country	NZ Hot	WW	Sales	Certifications	Album
2017	"Lady May"	—	—	—	—	—	—	—	—		RIAA: Platinum; MC: 3× Platinum; RMNZ: Gold	Purgatory
2017	"Whitehouse Road"	—	—	—	—	—	—	—	—	US: 82,000	RIAA: Platinum; MC: 2× Platinum	Purgatory
2017	"Universal Sound"	—	—	—	—	—	—	—	—		MC: Gold	Purgatory
2019	"House Fire"	—	—	—	40	—	—	—	—		RIAA: Platinum; MC: Gold	Country Squire
2019	"All Your'n"	—	46	—	16	—	—	—	—	US: 21,000	RIAA: 6× Platinum; BPI: Silver; MC: 2× Platinum; RMNZ: Platinum	Country Squire
2023	"In Your Love"	43	7	43	7	91	56	29	131		RIAA: 2× Platinum; MC: Platinum	Rustin' in the Rain
2025	"Nose On the Grindstone"	—	—	60	15	—	—	—	—		RMNZ: Platinum	Snipe Hunter
2025	"Bitin' List"	— (Note: "Bitin' List" did not enter the Billboard Hot 100, but peaked at No. 2 on the Bubbling Under Hot 100 chart)	30	—	33	—	—	—	—		RIAA: Gold	Snipe Hunter
"—" denotes releases that did not chart

== Other charted and certified songs ==
List of other charted and certified songs, with selected peak chart positions and certifications shown
Year	Title	Peak chart positions			Certifications	Album
Year	Title	US Bub.	US Country	NZ Hot	Certifications	Album
2017	"Feathered Indians"	—	—	—	RIAA: 2× Platinum; BPI: Silver; MC: 3× Platinum; RMNZ: Platinum	Purgatory
2017	"Tattoos"	—	—	—	MC: Gold	Purgatory
2019	"Country Squire"	—	—	—	RIAA: Gold	Country Squire
2020	"Long Violent History"	—	48	—		Long Violent History
2022	"Angel Band"	—	41	—		Can I Take My Hounds to Heaven?
2022	"Way of the Triune God"	—	37	—	RIAA: Platinum	Can I Take My Hounds to Heaven?
2024	"Song While You're Away"	—	48	—		Twisters: The Album
2025	"Oneida"	14	37	32		Snipe Hunter
2025	"Eatin' Big Time"	12	35	29		Snipe Hunter
"—" denotes releases that did not chart

== Music videos ==
List of music videos, with year of release and director name shown
Year	Video	Director(s)	Ref.
2017	"Whitehouse Road"	Brainwrap Productions	
2019	"House Fire"		
2019	"All Your'n"	Matt Stawski	
2020	"Country Squire"	Tony Moore	
2022	"Angel Band (Jubilee Version)"	Bryan Schlam	
2023	"In Your Love"	Bryan Schlam	
