= 2023 Americana Music Honors & Awards =

Americana Music Honors & Awards

- Date: September 20, 2023
- Location: Ryman Auditorium; Nashville, Tennessee
- Hosted by: The Milk Carton Kids

Highlights
- Most nominations: Charley Crockett and Margo Price (3)
- Website: americanamusic.org/awards

Television/radio coverage
- Network: Circle, PBS,

The 2023 Americana Music Honors & Awards ceremony was held on Wednesday, September 20, 2023, at Ryman Auditorium the in Nashville, Tennessee. The marquee event for the Americana Music Association, artists are awarded for outstanding achievements in the music industry. The show was livestreamed on the Circle YouTube channel and on the AMA's Facebook page, plus live radio broadcasts on SiriusXM and local Tennessee stations WSM, WMOT and WRLT. An hour-long special of highlights aired on PBS in November as part of Austin City Limits. The Milk Carton Kids returned to host the ceremony, having previously hosted in 2018 and 2019.

Charley Crockett and Margo Price lead the member-voted nominations, with three each, followed by Allison Russell with two. In addition to the six competitive categories, five lifetime achievement awards and one special award (to Russell) were also presented at the ceremony.

== Performers ==
Performers were announced on September 14, 2023. All performers were backed by the All-Star Americana House Band led by Buddy Miller (guitar) and featuring Brady Blade (drums), Catherine Popper (bass), Fred Eltringham (drums), Jen Gunderman (piano), Jim Hoke (pedal steel), Larry Campbell (fiddle/mandolin/guitar) and The McCrary Sisters (vocals).

Artist(s)	Song(s)
Logan Ledger	Tribute to Jimmy Buffett "Come Monday"
Sunny War	"Whole"
49 Winchester	"Russell County Line"
Adeem the Artist	"Middle of a Heart"
Bettye LaVette	"In the Meantime"
William Prince	"When You Miss Someone"
S.G. Goodman	"Space And Time"
The Milk Carton Kids Noah Kahan	"American Tune"
Nickel Creek	"Where the Long Line Leads"
Rufus Wainwright Logan Ledger	"Ol' '55"
The War and Treaty	"Stretch Out"
Margo Price	"Been To The Mountain"
Allison Russell	"Eve Was Black"
Patty Griffin	"Shine a Different Way"
Bonnie Raitt	"Made Up Mind"
Buddy Miller	"We're Leavin'"
Brandy Clark Brandi Carlile	"Dear Insecurity"
Hermanos Gutiérrez	"Hermosa Drive"
Angel Olsen	"Big Time"
The Avett Brothers	"I Wish I Was"
Larry Campbell The Avett Brothers Bettye LaVette Nickel Creek SistaStrings Billy Strings Margo Price The Milk Carton Kids Angel Olsen Rufus Wainwright S.G. Goodman William Prince Jim Lauderdale Allison Russell Brandi Carlile Shovels & Rope Noah Kahan Steve Jordan The McCrary Sisters	Tribute to Robbie Robertson "Cripple Creek"

== Winners and nominees ==
The eligibility period for the 22nd Americana Music Honors & Awards is April 1, 2022 to March 31, 2023. The nominees were announced by Gina Miller on May 9, 2023, at a ceremony at the National Museum of African American Music in Nashville which features performances from Margo Price, S.G. Goodman and The McCrary Sisters.

Artist of the Year	Album of the Year
Billy Strings; Charley Crockett; Sierra Ferrell; Margo Price; Allison Russell	Can I Take My Hounds to Heaven? - Tyler Childers; Big Time - Angel Olsen; El Bueno y el Malo - Hermanos Gutiérrez; The Man from Waco - Charley Crockett; Strays - Margo Price
Song of the Year	Emerging Act of the Year
"Just Like That" - Bonnie Raitt; "Change of Heart" - Jeremy Ivey and Margo Price; "I'm Just a Clown" - Charley Crockett; "Something in the Orange" - Zach Bryan; "You're Not Alone" - Allison Russell	S.G. Goodman; Adeem the Artist; William Prince; Thee Sacred Souls; Sunny War
Duo/Group of the Year	Instrumentalist of the Year
The War and Treaty; 49 Winchester; Caamp; Nickel Creek; Plains	SistaStrings (Chauntee and Monique Ross); Isa Burke; Allison de Groot; Jeff Picker; Kyle Tuttle

== Honors ==
The 2023 Lifetime Achievement honorees were announced on September 8, 2023.

=== Americana Trailblazer Award ===
- Nickel Creek

=== Legacy of Americana Award ===
- Bettye LaVette

=== Lifetime Achievement Award for Executive ===
- George Fontaine Sr

=== Lifetime Achievement Award for Performance ===
- The Avett Brothers

=== Lifetime Achievement Award for Songwriting ===
- Patty Griffin

=== Spirit of Americana Award ===
- Allison Russell

== Presenters ==
Presenters were announced on September 14, 2023.

- Dom Flemons - presented Instrumentalist of the Year
- Buddy Miller - presented Lifetime Achievement Award for Executive
- Pete Muller - introduced Adeem the Artist
- Noelle Taylor and Steve Jordan - presented Legacy of Americana Award
- The War and Treaty - introduced William Prince
- Silas House - introduced S.G. Goodman
- Shovels & Rope - presented Emerging Act of the Year and introduced The Milk Carton Kids with Noah Kahan
- Kacey Musgraves - presented Americana Trailblazer Award
- Warren Zanes - introduced Rufus Wainwright
- John Seigenthaler, Gloria Johnson, Justin Jones and Justin J. Pearson - presented Spirit of Americana Award
- Jessi Colter - introduced Margo Price
- John Oates and William Bell - presented Duo/Group of the Year and introduced Allison Russell
- Sarah Silverman - presented Lifetime Achievement Award for Songwriting
- Jed Hilly - introduced Bonnie Raitt
- Lyle Lovett - presented Song of the Year and introduced Hermanos Gutiérrez
- Teddy Thompson - introduced Angel Olsen
- Anthony Mason - presented Album of the Year
- Brandi Carlile - presented Lifetime Achievement Award for Performance
- Jim Lauderdale - presented Artist of the Year
