= El Bueno y el Malo =

Studio album by Hermanos Gutiérrez
- Released: 28 October 2022
- Studio: Easy Eye (Nashville, Tennessee)
- Genre: Ambient; instrumental rock
- Length: 33:41
- Label: Easy Eye Sound
- Producer: Dan Auerbach

Hermanos Gutiérrez chronology
Eternamente (2021)	El Bueno y el Malo (2022)	Sonido Cósmico (2024)

El Bueno y el Malo ("The Good and the Bad") is the fifth studio album by Ecuadorian-Swiss band Hermanos Gutiérrez, consisting of brothers Estevan and Alejandro Gutiérrez. It was released on 28 October 2022 by Easy Eye Sound. The ambient instrumental rock album was recorded by producer Dan Auerbach in his Nashville studio.

Musically, it centers on the brothers' guitar interplay, with additions of percussion, drums, electric keyboards, and strings. The album was praised by critics, who compared its sound primarily to Ennio Morricone's soundtrack for namesake film The Good, the Bad and the Ugly. It was nominated for Album of the Year at the 2023 Americana Music Honors & Awards, and was part of Auerbach's nomination for the Grammy Award for Producer of the Year, Non-Classical at the 65th Annual Grammy Awards.

== Background and release ==
The album was released on 28 October 2022, by Easy Eye Sound, with distribution handled by Concord Records. Its titled, translated in English to "The Good and the Bad", was named after the 1966 film The Good, the Bad and the Ugly, and was inspired by Ennio Morricone's soundtrack for the movie.

== Recording ==
The duo, consisting of real-life brothers Estevan and Alejandro Gutiérrez, recorded at Dan Auerbach's Nashville studio Easy Eye Sound. Auerbach said that he got a "powerful sensation" when he first heard the brothers' music which made him instantly want to work with them. He described their music by saying "You have to recalibrate yourself when you listen to their music. You gotta get down in there to be able to hear it all. They have this supernatural brother bond and I don't think they even realize how into these rhythms and deep down into these songs they exist." Their first day in studio was the first time they had met Auerbach in person. In recording them, Auerbach added limited guitar and percussion, but his goal to preserve their sound meant adding too much would throw off the balance they had already perfected. The title track was recorded 20 minutes after the duo arrived at the studio, with Auerbach having pressed the record button without telling the brothers to capture them as they worked out the song.

== Style ==
The duo's sound centers on the interplay between Estevan's electric guitar and Alejandro's lap steel guitar, with the two switching between lead and rhythm guitar roles. The duo's ambient instrumental rock sound takes cues most notably from Ennio Morricone, with other noted influences including Ry Cooder (especially his score for Paris, Texas); the Western film scores of Nico Fidenco, Alessandro Alessandroni, and Luis Bacalov; and Latin American music from the 1950s and 1960s, including notes of Mexican cumbia. They are backed by strings by Matt Combs; congas, shakers, triangles, and other percussion by Sam Bacco; electric keyboards by Mike Rojas, and drums by Jay Mumford. Auerbach joins on guitar on the song "Tres Hermanos".

== Reception ==
El Bueno y el Malo ratings
Review scores
Source	Rating
AllMusic	4/5 stars
Louder Than War	3.5/5 stars
Mojo	4/5 stars

PopMatters's Evan Sawdey called El Bueno y el Malo the third-best ambient album of 2022, praising the brothers' "unmissable guitar interplay" and summarizing by saying its name "references the Good and the Bad, but it feels misleading when every track here is of excellent quality." Similarly, Louder Than War's Gordon Rutherford said there was no ugly nor bad in the album, only "the good and, at times, the very good", and made a favorable comparison to Calexico's 2022 album El Mirador. AllMusic's Thom Jurek wrote that the "gorgeous" album "will present a greater opportunity for listeners to encounter the nomadic, atmospheric sound world of Hermanos Gutiérrez. Don't miss it." Variety's Jem Aswad called it "the kind of album you can put on and leave on all day, and the relatively amorphous nature of the songs helps make it not feel repetitive", and particularly recommended it for fans of Khruangbin. Mojo's Jim Irvin made the same comparison to Khruangbin.

El Bueno y el Malo was nominated for Album of the Year at the 2023 Americana Music Honors & Awards, losing to Tyler Childers's Can I Take My Hounds to Heaven? For his collected work in that period, including El Bueno y el Malo, Auerbach was nominated for the Grammy Award for Producer of the Year, Non-Classical at the 65th Annual Grammy Awards.

== Live ==
The duo performed on NPR Music's Tiny Desk Concert on 31 January 2023, playing the title track, "Tres Hermanos", "Thunderbird", and "Pueblo Man".

== Track listing ==
All tracks are written by Estevan and Alejandro Gutiérrez.

El Bueno y el Malo track listing
No.	Title	Length
1.	"El Bueno y el Malo"	3:25
2.	"Hermosa Drive"	3:54
3.	"Los Chicos Tristes"	3:49
4.	"Thunderbird"	3:28
5.	"Cielo Grande"	2:56
6.	"Tres Hermanos" (featuring Dan Auerbach)	3:21
7.	"Pueblo Man"	2:48
8.	"La Verdad"	3:58
9.	"Los Amantes"	2:36
10.	"Dorado Valley"	3:26
Total length:		33:41

== Personnel ==
=== Hermanos Gutiérrez ===
- Estevan Gutiérrez – electric guitar, bongo (2, 4–10), cowbell (6), bass guitar (7)
- Alejandro Gutiérrez – electric guitar, slide guitar, gut-string guitar

=== Additional musicians ===
- Sam Bacco – conga (1–7, 9, 10), maracas (1–3, 5–7), tambourine (1, 10), triangle (3), castanets (4), timbales (6)
- Mike Rojas – electric piano (2, 6, 8, 10)), Hammond B3 (4), bass (8, 9)
- Jay Mumford – drums (2, 4, 8, 10)
- Matt Combs – strings (3)
- Dan Auerbach – guitar (6)

=== Technical ===
- Dan Auerbach – producer, mixing engineer
- M. Allen Parker – recording engineer, mixing engineer
- Jonny Ullman, McKinley James, and Tyler Zwiep – assistant recording engineers
- Caleb VanBuskirk – audio engineer
- Ryan Smith – mastering engineer

== Charts ==
El Bueno y el Malo charts
Chart	Peak
UK Americana Albums (OCC)	3
