= Grammy Award for Best Country Solo Performance =

Annual music award

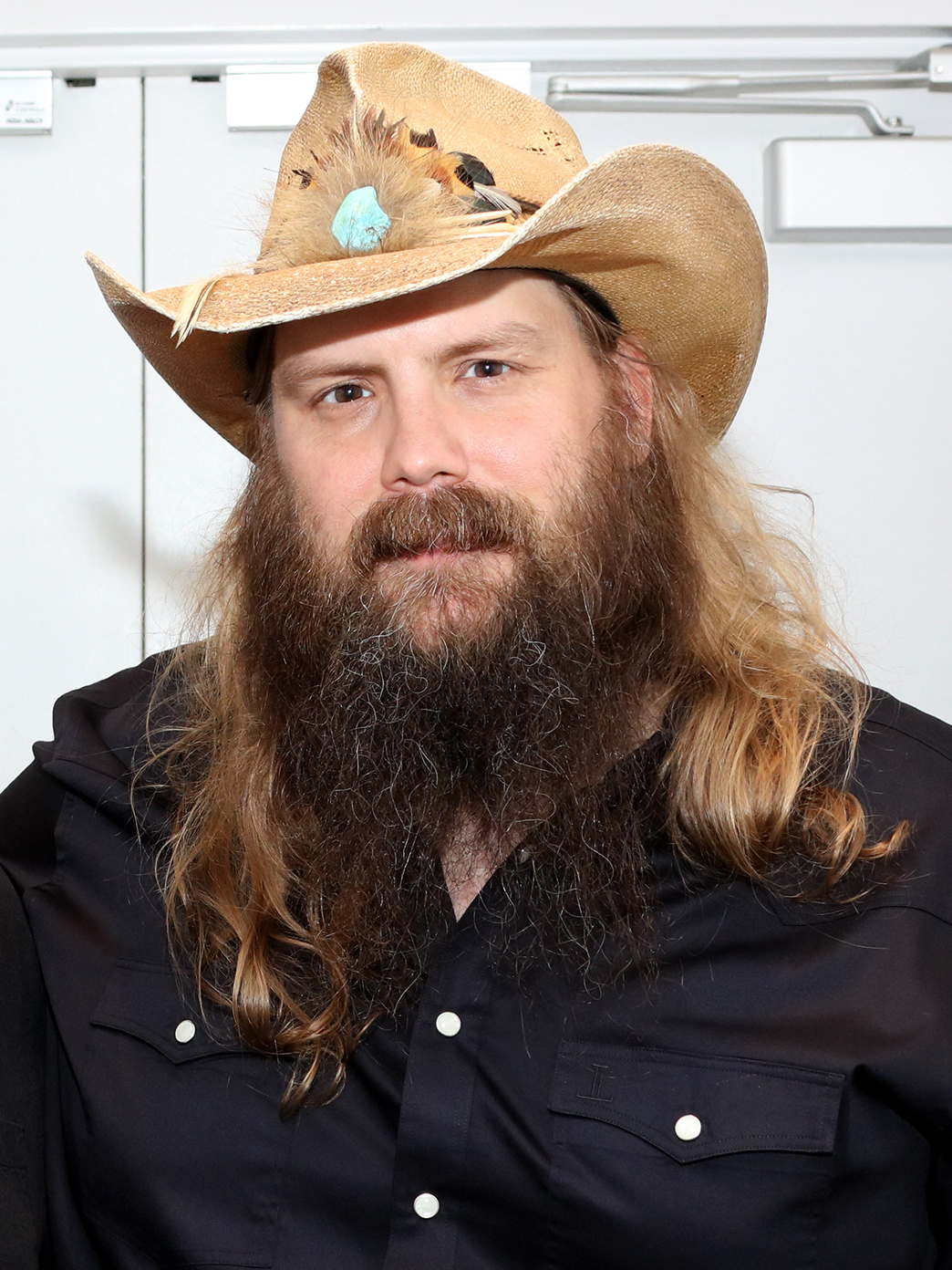
- "Bad as I Used to Be" (from F1 the Movie) by Chris Stapleton is the most recent recipient
- Awarded for: Quality solo vocal or instrumental country recordings
- Country: United States
- Presented by: National Academy of Recording Arts and Sciences
- First award: 2012
- Currently held by: Chris Stapleton – "Bad as I Used to Be" (2026)
- Website: grammy.com

The Grammy Award for Best Country Solo Performance is an award presented at the Grammy Awards, a ceremony that was established in 1958 and originally called the Gramophone Awards. According to the 54th Grammy Awards description guide, it is designed for solo (vocal or instrumental) country recordings and is limited to singles or tracks only.

The award combines the previous categories for Best Female Country Vocal Performance, Best Male Country Vocal Performance and Best Country Instrumental Performance (if it is an instrumental solo performance). The restructuring of these categories was a result of the Recording Academy's wish to decrease the list of categories and awards and to eliminate the distinctions between male and female performances.

== Recipients ==
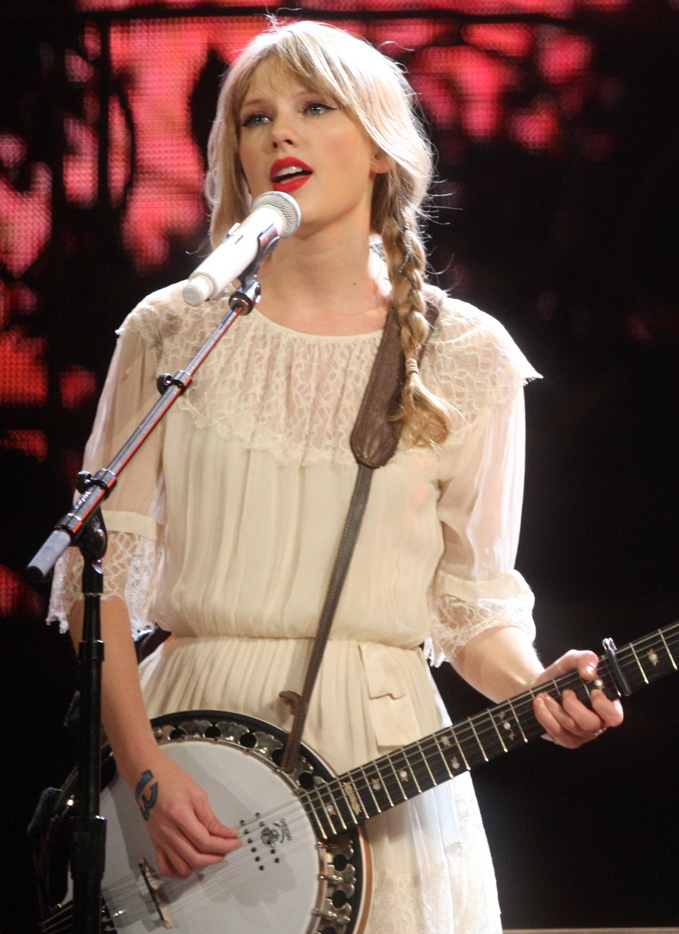
The first winner of the award was Taylor Swift for her song "Mean" in 2012.

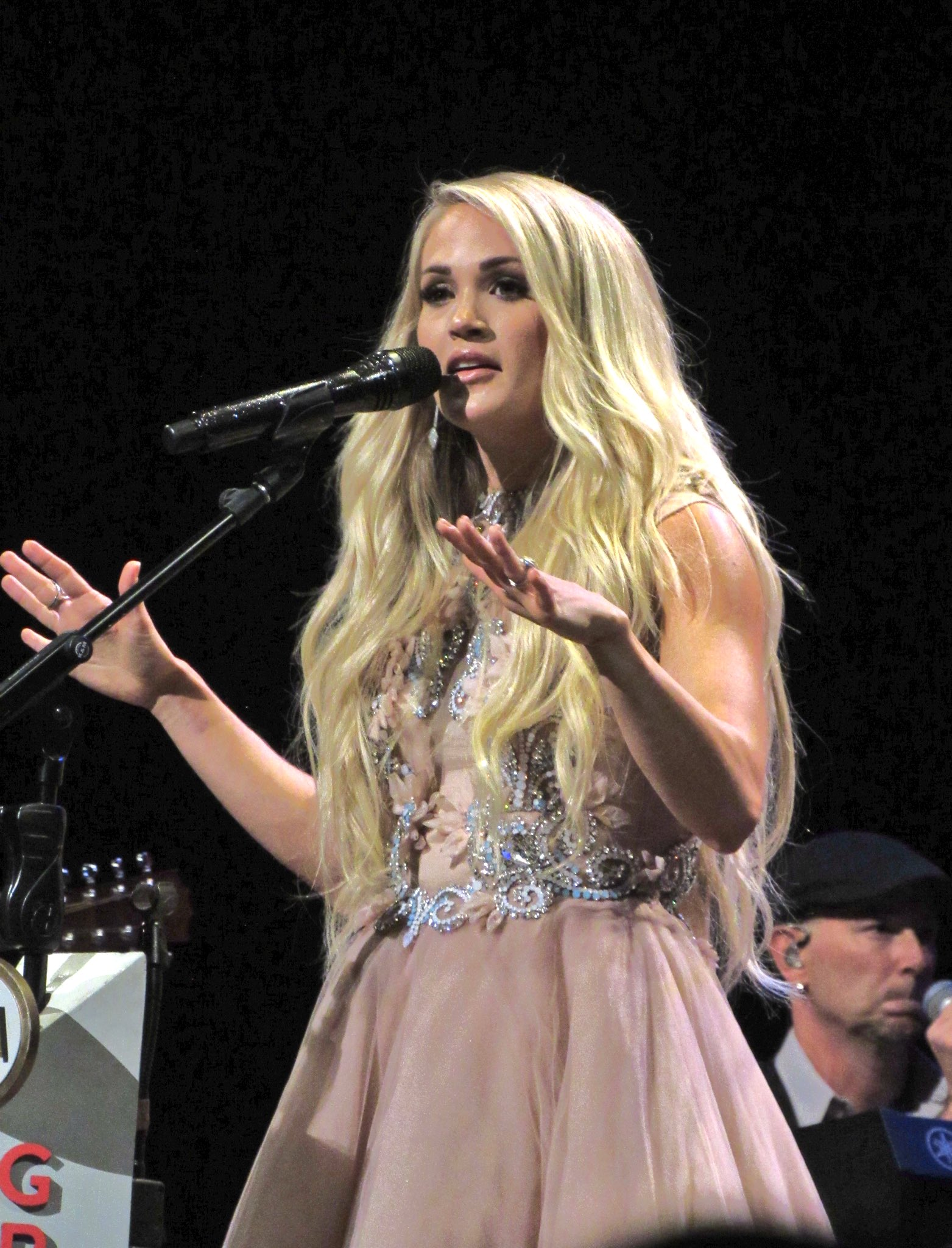
Two-time winner Carrie Underwood

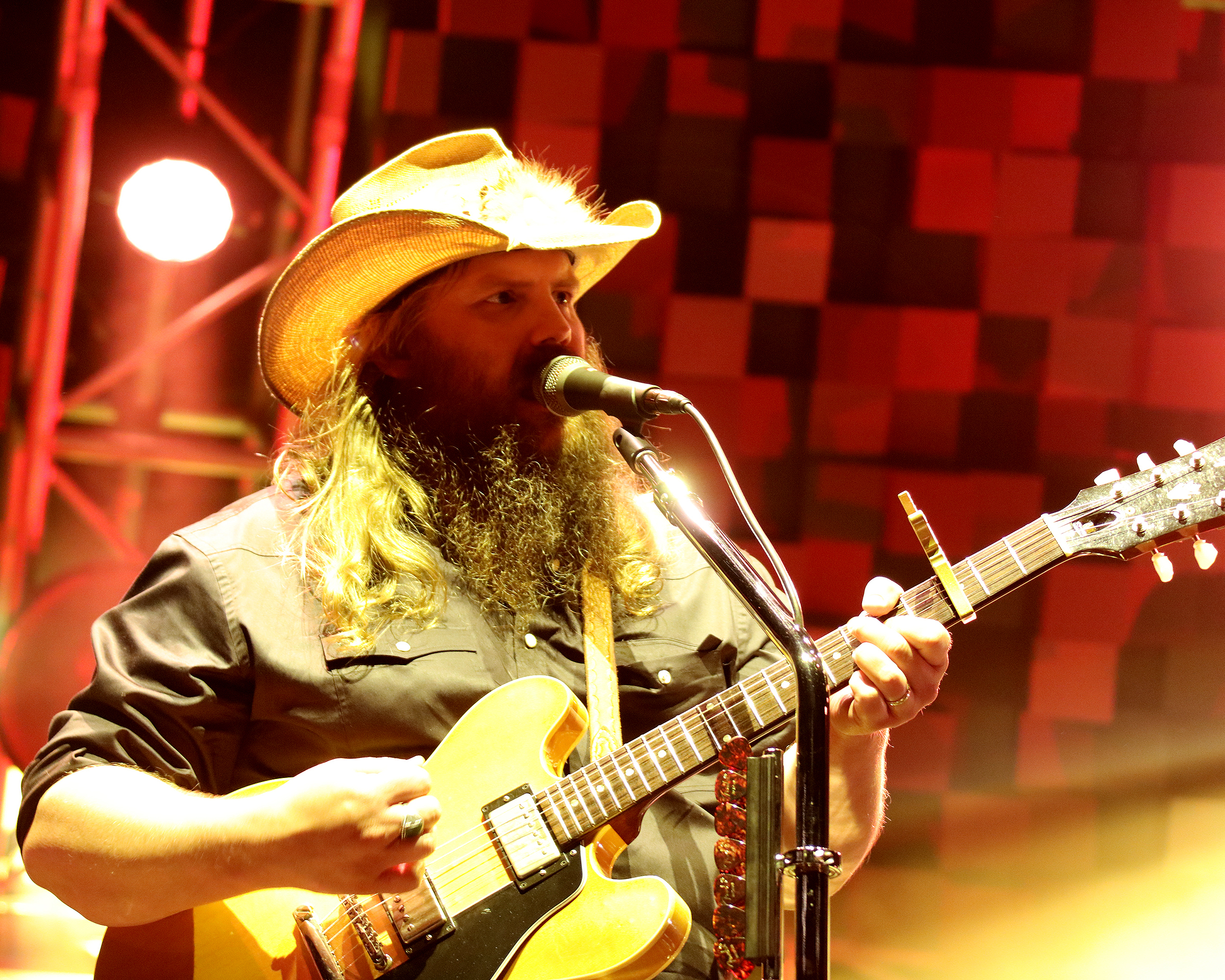
Chris Stapleton has the most wins with six in total.

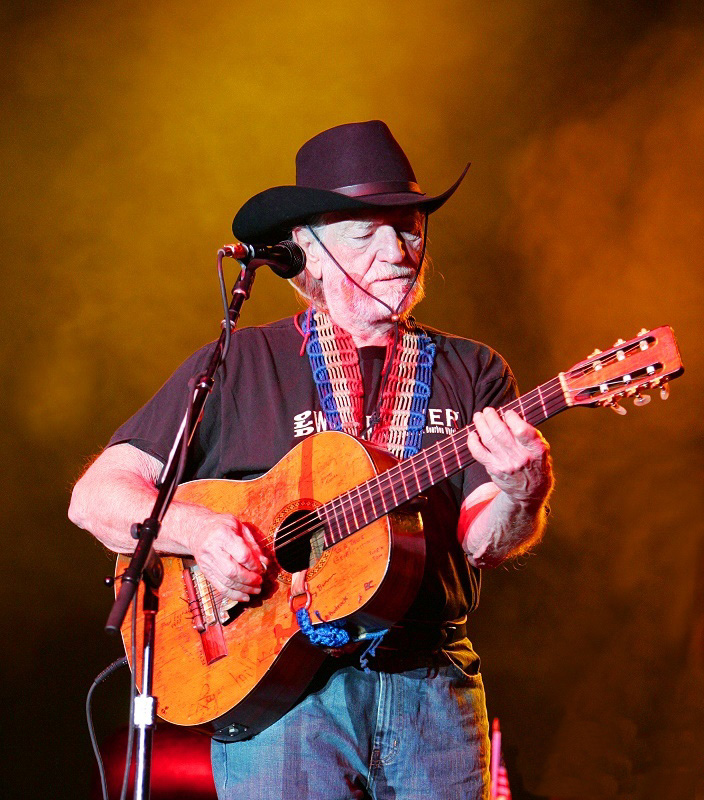
2020 and 2023 winner Willie Nelson

=== 2010s ===
Year	Artist	Work
2012
2012	Taylor Swift	"Mean"
2012	Jason Aldean	"Dirt Road Anthem"
2012	Martina McBride	"I'm Gonna Love You Through It"
2012	Blake Shelton	"Honey Bee"
2012	Carrie Underwood	"Mama's Song"
2013
2013	Carrie Underwood	"Blown Away"
2013	Dierks Bentley	"Home"
2013	Eric Church	"Springsteen"
2013	Ronnie Dunn	"Cost of Livin'"
2013	Hunter Hayes	"Wanted"
2013	Blake Shelton	"Over"
2014
2014	Darius Rucker	"Wagon Wheel"
2014	Lee Brice	"I Drive Your Truck"
2014	Hunter Hayes	"I Want Crazy"
2014	Miranda Lambert	"Mama's Broken Heart"
2014	Blake Shelton	"Mine Would Be You"
2015
2015	Carrie Underwood	"Something in the Water"
2015	Eric Church	"Give Me Back My Hometown"
2015	Hunter Hayes	"Invisible"
2015	Miranda Lambert	"Automatic"
2015	Keith Urban	"Cop Car"
2016
2016	Chris Stapleton	"Traveller"
2016	Cam	"Burning House"
2016	Carrie Underwood	"Little Toy Guns"
2016	Keith Urban	"John Cougar, John Deere, John 3:16"
2016	Lee Ann Womack	"Chances Are"
2017
2017	Maren Morris	"My Church"
2017	Brandy Clark	"Love Can Go to Hell"
2017	Carrie Underwood	"Church Bells"
2017	Keith Urban	"Blue Ain't Your Color"
2017	Miranda Lambert	"Vice"
2018
2018	Chris Stapleton	"Either Way"
2018	Sam Hunt	"Body Like a Back Road"
2018	Alison Krauss	"Losing You"
2018	Miranda Lambert	"Tin Man"
2018	Maren Morris	"I Could Use a Love Song"
2019
2019	Kacey Musgraves	"Butterflies"
2019	Loretta Lynn	"Wouldn't It Be Great?"
2019	Maren Morris	"Mona Lisas and Mad Hatters"
2019	Chris Stapleton	"Millionaire"
2019	Keith Urban	"Parallel Line"

=== 2020s ===
Year	Artist	Work
2020
2020	Willie Nelson	"Ride Me Back Home"
2020	Ashley McBryde	"Girl Goin' Nowhere"
2020	Tyler Childers	"All Your'n"
2020	Blake Shelton	"God's Country"
2020	Tanya Tucker	"Bring My Flowers Now"
2021
2021	Vince Gill	"When My Amy Prays"
2021	Eric Church	"Stick That in Your Country Song"
2021	Brandy Clark	"Who You Thought I Was"
2021	Miranda Lambert	"Bluebird"
2021	Mickey Guyton	"Black Like Me"
2022
2022	Chris Stapleton	"You Should Probably Leave"
2022	Luke Combs	"Forever After All"
2022	Mickey Guyton	"Remember Her Name"
2022	Jason Isbell	"All I Do Is Drive"
2022	Kacey Musgraves	"Camera Roll"
2023
2023	Willie Nelson	"Live Forever"
2023	Kelsea Ballerini	"Heartfirst"
2023	Zach Bryan	"Something in the Orange"
2023	Miranda Lambert	"In His Arms"
2023	Maren Morris	"Circles Around This Town"
2024
2024	Chris Stapleton	"White Horse"
2024	Tyler Childers	"In Your Love"
2024	Brandy Clark	"Buried"
2024	Luke Combs	"Fast Car"
2024	Dolly Parton	"The Last Thing on My Mind"
2025
2025	Chris Stapleton	"It Takes a Woman"
2025	Beyoncé	"16 Carriages"
2025	Jelly Roll	"I Am Not Okay"
2025	Kacey Musgraves	"The Architect"
2025	Shaboozey	"A Bar Song (Tipsy)"
2026
2026	Chris Stapleton	"Bad as I Used to Be"
2026	Tyler Childers	"Nose on the Grindstone"
2026	Shaboozey	"Good News"
2026	Zach Top	"I Never Lie"
2026	Lainey Wilson	"Somewhere Over Laredo"
2027	Vince Gill	"The Whole World"
2027	Ella Langley	"Choosin' Texas"
2027	Kacey Musgraves	"Dry Spell"
2027	Lainey Wilson	"Can't Sit Still"
2027	Stephen Wilson Jr.	"Gary"

== Artists with multiple wins ==
6 wins

- Chris Stapleton

2 wins

- Carrie Underwood
- Willie Nelson

== Artists with multiple nominations ==
7 nominations

- Chris Stapleton

6 nominations

- Miranda Lambert

5 nominations

- Carrie Underwood

4 nominations

- Maren Morris
- Kacey Musgraves
- Blake Shelton
- Keith Urban

3 nominations

- Brandy Clark
- Tyler Childers
- Eric Church
- Hunter Hayes

2 nominations

- Luke Combs
- Vince Gill
- Mickey Guyton
- Willie Nelson
- Shaboozey
- Lainey Wilson

== See also ==
- Grammy Award for Best Female Country Vocal Performance
- Grammy Award for Best Male Country Vocal Performance
- Grammy Award for Best Country Duo/Group Performance
- Grammy Award for Best Country Song
- Grammy Award for Best Country Album
