= S.G. Goodman =

American singer-songwriter

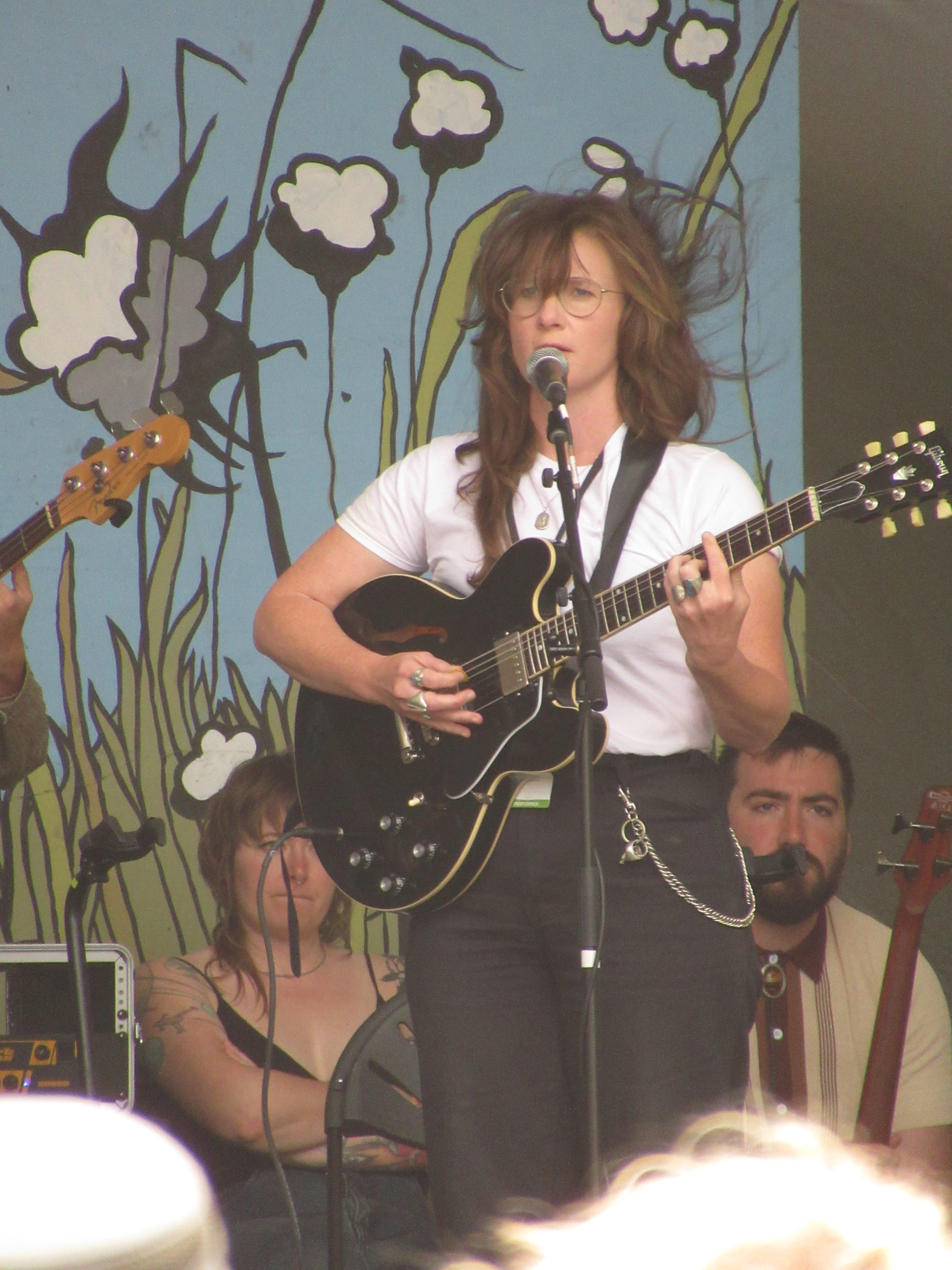
- S.G. Goodman performing at the Winnipeg Folk Festival

Background information
- Born: 1989 (age 36); Hickman, Kentucky, US
- Genres: Americana, folk, country, rock
- Occupation: Singer-songwriter
- Label: Slough Water Records
- Formerly of: The Savage Radley
- Website: www.sggoodman.net

S.G. Goodman is an American folk and country singer-songwriter from Hickman, Kentucky. She has released three studio albums, Old Time Feeling in 2020, Teeth Marks in 2022, and Planting by the Signs in 2025, and received the 2023 Emerging Artist of the Year award at the Americana Music Association Awards.

== Early life ==
Goodman was raised in Hickman, Kentucky. The Southern Baptist church played a central role in her childhood in Kentucky saying she went to church 3 times a week with her family. Goodman began performing by singing in church. Her father was a farmer. She has played rhythm guitar since she was 15 and been driving since she was 7, which is illegal under Kentucky state law.

Goodman moved to Murray, Kentucky, in 2007 to attend Murray State University, where she studied philosophy.

== Career ==
Prior to her solo career, Goodman started the music project The Savage Radley with drummer Stephen Montgomery, releasing their first and only album Kudzu with Slough Water Records.

Her debut solo album, Old Time Feeling, was co-produced by Jim James of My Morning Jacket. The album has been described as Americana, folk, country, and rock. She is signed to Verve Forecast Records. Tyler Childers covered "Space and Time" from Old Time Feeling on his album Rustin' in the Rain. "Space and Time" was also covered by Devonté Hynes and Mereba for the soundtrack to the 2022 film, Master Gardener. Her favorite guitar to use are Guild Starfires due to their humbuckers.

In 2021, as a solo artist, she was among other things part of the Newport Folk Festival in July.

In June 2022, Goodman released her second album, Teeth Marks, on Verve Forecast. She usually plays with her guitar tuned down a whole step, though some songs on the record were played in this tuning with a capo. The fifth track on the album, "If You Were Someone I Loved" deals with the opioid crisis. Because her debut album was released during the COVID-19 pandemic, Goodman did not headline a tour for the album. As such, her tour for Teeth Marks was her first solo tour.

Goodman released her third studio album, Planting by the Signs, on June 20, 2025, via Slough Water Records and Thirty Tigers in LP, CD and digital formats.

== Personal life ==
Goodman lives in Murray, Kentucky.

== Discography ==
Studio albums

- Old Time Feeling (2020)
- Teeth Marks (2022)
- Planting by the Signs (2025)

== Awards and nominations ==
Year	Award	Category	Work	Result	Notes	Ref.
2023	Americana Music Honors & Awards	Emerging Artist of the Year	n/a	Won		
2023	Hollywood Music in Media Awards	Original Song – Independent Film	"Space and Time"	Nominated	S.G. Goodman (writer); Mereba (performer); Master Gardener (film)	
2026	Americana Music Honors & Awards	Album of the Year	Planting by the Signs	TBA		
2026	Americana Music Honors & Awards	Song of the Year	"Snapping Turtle"	TBA		
