= Bryan Schlam =

American music video director

- Occupations: Music video director, editor
- Years active: 2012–present

Bryan Schlam is an American music video director. His video for Tyler Childers's "In Your Love" was nominated for a Grammy Award for Best Music Video.

== Career ==
Schlam graduated from Emerson College in 2008. He has directed music videos for artists including Tyler Childers, The Black Keys, Billy Strings, James Bay, James Arthur, Krewella, and Dan Auerbach. He recently directed Billy Strings’s “10,000 Miles from a Friend” (2026).

== Filmography ==
=== Selected music videos ===
Year	Title	Artist/Band	Roles
2012	"Alive"	Krewella	Director and editor
2012	"Still Life with Hot Deuce and Silver Platter"	Titus Andronicus	Director and editor
2015	"Nausea"	Jeff Rosenstock	Director and editor
2015	"No Price"	Slam Dunk'd	Director and editor
2016	"Sometimes"	Oscar	Director and editor
2016	"Good Things"	Oscar	Director and editor
2017	"Waiting on a Song"	Dan Auerbach	Director and editor
2018	"Us"	James Bay	Director and editor
2018	"Stock Image"	Miya Folick	Director and editor
2019	"Go"	The Black Keys	Director and editor
2021	"September"	James Arthur	Director and editor
2022	"Wild Child"	The Black Keys	Director and editor
2022	"Angel Band (Jubilee)"	Tyler Childers	Director and editor
2023	"In Your Love"	Tyler Childers	Director and editor
2024	"Seven Weeks in County"	Billy Strings	Director and editor
2026	"10,000 Miles from a Friend"	Billy Strings	Director and editor

== Awards and nominations ==
Year	Result	Award	Category	Work	Ref.
2016	Won	AIM Independent Music Awards	Independent Video of the Year	Oscar - "Sometimes"	
2022	Nominated	UK Music Video Awards	Best Rock Video - International	The Black Keys – "Wild Child"	
2023	Nominated	Tribeca Festival	Music videos	The Black Keys – "Wild Child"	
2024	Nominated	Grammy Awards	Best Music Video	Tyler Childers – "In Your Love"	
2024	Nominated	CMT Music Awards	Male Breakthrough Video of the Year	Tyler Childers – "In Your Love"	
2024	Nominated	CMT Music Awards	Video of the Year	Tyler Childers – "In Your Love"	
2024	Nominated	Academy of Country Music Awards	Visual Media of the Year	Tyler Childers – "In Your Love"	
2024	Nominated	MTV Video Music Awards	Video for Good	Tyler Childers – "In Your Love"	
2024	Nominated	Webby Awards	Best Social Short Form Video	The Black Keys – "Ohio Players"	
2025	Nominated	South by Southwest	Music Video competition	Billy Strings – "Seven Weeks in County"	
2025	Won	Clio Awards	Best Music Video	Billy Strings – "Seven Weeks in County"	
