= Planting by the Signs =

Studio album by S.G. Goodman
- Released: June 20, 2025
- Studios: NuttHouse Recording Studio, Sheffield, Alabama; Chase Park Transduction Studio; Earthwave Studio
- Length: 48:02
- Labels: Slough Water; Thirty Tigers
- Producers: Matthew Rowan; S.G. Goodman; Drew Vandenberg

S.G. Goodman chronology
Teeth Marks (2022)	Planting by the Signs (2025)

Singles from Planting by the Signs
- 1. "Fire Sign" Released: April 2, 2025; 2. "Satellite" Released: April 23, 2025; 3. "Snapping Turtle" Released: May 14, 2025

Planting by the Signs is the third studio album by American singer-songwriter S.G. Goodman. It was released on June 20, 2025, via Slough Water Records and Thirty Tigers in LP, CD and digital formats.

== Background ==
Consisting of tracks ranging between three and eight minutes, with a total runtime of approximately fifty-one minutes, the album was co-produced by Matthew Rowan, Goodman and Drew Vandenberg. It was recorded at NuttHouse in Sheffield, Alabama.

Preceded by Goodman's 2022 project, Teeth Marks, it features contributions from Bonnie Billy, and centers on the themes of loss and love.

The first single, "Fire Sign", was released on April 2, 2025. It was followed by the second single, "Satellite", on April 23, 2025, and the third single, "Snapping Turtle", on May 14, 2025, with a music video directed by Elaine McMillion Sheldon.

== Reception ==
Professional ratings
Review scores
Source	Rating
Mojo	4/5 stars
Paste	8.4/10
Pitchfork	8.1/10
Record Collector	4/5 stars
Spectrum Culture	70%
Spill	4.5/5 stars

American Songwriter described the album as capturing "the soul of Appalachia, from its roots and growths to more personal circle of life stories of endings and rebirths" and centering "around the notion of passing down stories and sayings over generations." Spill Magazine assigned it a rating of four and a half, stating "Stylistically, no big changes, after all, there was no need for those, but the level of the songwriting has gone up a few notches, both lyrically and musically, so has the level of arrangements, pushing Goodman's excellent vocals to the foreground and letting her lyrics shine even more."

The album received a 8.4 rating from Paste, whose reviewer Andy Crump described it as "a deeply mournful piece of work, characterized broadly by unhurried drum patterns and fretwork with an inner core where Goodman contends with her darkest hours in 2023," referring to the period in which Goodman's friend Harmon and her dog Howard died. Planting by the Signs was given a rating of 8.1 by Pitchfork, which remarked, "All across the album, Goodman showcases a great understanding of space and how to fill it." Spectrum Culture rated the album 70% and noted, "Planting by the Signs doesn't exactly arrive as a concept album, but it delivers a thematic and compositional unity that positions it in its own place and time."

Mark Cooper of Mojo assigned it a rating of four stars and commented, "Goodman's latest collection has an unhurried Southern swing that pulls like an undertow against the emotional freight of confessional songs, while there's a new radio-friendly focus to crunchy opening anthems that should deservedly expand her appeal." Kevin Harley of Record Collector described it as "a record that connects earthy personal striving with lunar cycles," giving it a rating of four stars. Maeri Ferguson of No Depression stated that the album "relishes the quiet respite of settling back in, communing with neighbors and relearning the rhythms of home."

=== Accolades ===
Planting by the Signs was nominated for Album of the Year at the 2026 Americana Music Honors and Awards. "Snapping Turtle" was also nominated for Song of the Year.

== Track listing ==
All tracks are written by S.G. Goodman, except where noted.

Planting by the Signs track listing
No.	Title	Writer(s)	Length
1.	"Satellite"		3:42
2.	"Fire Sign"		2:58
3.	"I Can See the Devil"		3:18
4.	"Snapping Turtle"		6:24
5.	"Michael Told Me"		3:51
6.	"Solitaire"		4:14
7.	"I'm in Love"		3:42
8.	"Nature's Child" (featuring Bonnie "Prince" Billy)	Tyler Ladd	3:52
9.	"Heat Lightning"		3:22
10.	"Planting by the Signs" (featuring Matthew Rowan)		3:40
11.	"Heaven Song"		8:59
Total length:			48:02

== Personnel ==
Credits for Planting by the Signs adapted from Bandcamp.

- S.G. Goodman – vocals, guitar, keys, production, arranging
- Matthew Rowan – guitar, keys, bass, vocals, production
- Matt Pence – drums and percussion
- Craig Burletic – bass
- Ben Tanner – keys
- Eddy Dunlap – pedal steel
- Rich Ruth – guitar
- Bonnie "Prince" Billy – vocals
- Zak Riles – baritone guitar, engineering
- Clyde Charles – additional voices
- Mary Overbey – additional voices
- Myrtle Turner – additional voices
- Drew Vandenberg – production, mixing, engineering
- Sarah Register – mastering
- Josh Bovender – cover image, illustration
- Sarah Goldstein – layout and design
- Ryan Hartley – photography
