= Sonido Cósmico =

Studio album by Hermanos Gutiérrez
- Released: 14 June 2024
- Studio: Easy Eye (Nashville, Tennessee)
- Length: 40:04
- Label: Easy Eye Sound
- Producer: Dan Auerbach

Hermanos Gutiérrez chronology
El Bueno y el Malo (2022)	Sonido Cósmico (2024)

Sonido Cósmico ("Cosmic Sound") is the sixth studio album by Ecuadorian-Swiss band Hermanos Gutiérrez, consisting of brothers Estevan and Alejandro Gutiérrez. It was released on 14 June 2024 by Easy Eye Sound and recorded by producer Dan Auerbach at his Nashville studio, their second collaboration with Auerbach after predecessor El Bueno y el Malo (2022). The album received positive reviews from critics.

== Critical reception ==
Professional ratings
Aggregate scores
Source	Rating
Metacritic	87/100
Review scores
Source	Rating
AllMusic	4/5 stars
Clash	8/10
PopMatters	8/10
Uncut	9/10

Sonido Cósmico received a score of 87 out of 100 on review aggregator Metacritic based on four critics' reviews, which the website categorised as "universal acclaim". Uncut felt that "while the album is rooted in Ennio Morricone's dusty spaghetti western soundtracks and Daniel Lanois' high-lonesome ambient, songs like the spacy 'El Fantasma' and the kaleidoscopic title track ground their psychedelic drift in the intense chemistry between the two brothers and the way they play off each other supernaturally". Thom Jurek of AllMusic observed that the album "doesn't abandon their rich bevy of desert-blasted soundscapes entirely; these 12 tracks use a wider range of instruments and ponder the mysteries of space as much as the lonely, arid horizon".

Jamie Wilde of Clash wrote that "each moment on Sonido Cosmico feels different from the other; each picture evoking something different from the imagination. It's hard to find a track not to like here" as "the fact that two brothers create music of such depth playing nothing but their own guitars is astonishing". Adriane Pontecorvo of PopMatters stated that while "broadly echoing guitars and sparing percussion make up the bulk of the instrumentation", "no matter how spacey it all becomes, [...] the human warmth of the Gutiérrez brothers' playing continues to define their sound: their delicate approach to their instruments transforms string sounds into living voices, resonant in terms of both acoustics and emotions".

== Track listing ==
All tracks are written by Daniel Alejandro Hotz and Stephan Ricardo Hotz.

Sonido Cósmico track listing
No.	Title	Length
1.	"Lágrimas Negras"	3:12
2.	"Low Sun"	3:08
3.	"Cumbia Lunar"	2:37
4.	"Abuelita"	3:32
5.	"El Fantasma"	3:03
6.	"It's All in Your Mind"	4:38
7.	"Sonido Cósmico"	3:43
8.	"Barrio Hustle"	3:14
9.	"Until We Meet Again"	3:01
10.	"Los Navegantes"	4:12
11.	"Luz y Sombra"	3:08
12.	"Misterio Verde"	2:36
Total length:		40:04

== Personnel ==
Hermanos Gutiérrez

- Alejandro Gutiérrez – slide guitar (tracks 1, 2, 5, 9, 12), electric guitar (3, 4, 6–12)
- Estevan Gutiérrez – electric guitar (all tracks), bongos (2, 3, 5–7), cowbell (3, 8), claves (4), conga (9)

Additional musicians

- Mike Rojas – Hammond B3 (tracks 1, 2, 4–10), harmonium (1), piano (2–4, 6), Farfisa (3, 5, 7, 8), Rhodes electric piano (3, 8), vibraphone (7), Wurlitzer electric piano (9), Juno synthesizer (10)
- Jeffrey Clemens – drums (tracks 2, 4, 6)
- Dan Auerbach – Mellotron (track 2), tik-tak bass (6, 7), electric guitar (6, 8, 9), bass (6)
- Tom Bukovac – electric guitar (tracks 2, 4, 7, 10, 11), acoustic guitar (4), Mellotron (4)
- Sam Bacco – percussion (tracks 3–8, 10, 12)
- Adam Schreiber – drums, percussion (tracks 5, 7, 9, 10)
- Matt Combs – strings (track 7)

Technical

- Dan Auerbach – production, mixing
- Ryan Smith – mastering
- M. Allen Parker – mixing, engineering, recording
- Caleb VanBuskirk – additional engineering
- McKinley James – engineering assistance
- Jonny Ullman – engineering assistance
- Tyler Zweip – engineering assistance

Visuals

- Perry Shall – design, layout
- Jim Herrington – photography

== Charts ==
Chart performance for Sonido Cósmico
Chart (2024)	Peak position
Belgian Albums (Ultratop Flanders)	50
Belgian Albums (Ultratop Wallonia)	125
Dutch Albums (Album Top 100)	99
German Albums (Offizielle Top 100)	53
Scottish Albums (OCC)	53
Spanish Albums (PROMUSICAE)	45
Swiss Albums (Schweizer Hitparade)	6
UK Album Downloads (OCC)	75
UK Albums Sales (OCC)	22
UK Americana Albums (OCC)	6
US Billboard 200	193

Chart (2026)	Peak position
Greek Albums (IFPI)	96
