= All Your'n =

2019 song by Tyler Childers

Single by Tyler Childers

from the album Country Squire
- Released: June 21, 2019
- Studio: Butcher Shoppe (Nashville, Tennessee)
- Genre: Honky-tonk; country; neotraditional country
- Length: 3:38
- Label: Hickman Holler/RCA Nashville
- Songwriter: Tyler Childers
- Producers: Sturgill Simpson; David Ferguson

Tyler Childers singles chronology
"House Fire" (2019)	"All Your'n" (2019)	"In Your Love" (2023)

"All Your'n" is a song written and recorded by American country music singer Tyler Childers, released on June 21, 2019. It is the second single for Childers' third album Country Squire (2019) and is considered to be one of his signature songs.

== Background ==
"All Your'n" is a mid-tempo country-soul ballad. It blends traditional Appalachian roots music with elements of Muscle Shoals and Motown soul. The studio arrangement features throbbing keyboards, steady percussion, and wah-wah guitar. Childers wrote the song as a direct, sincere declaration of devotion to his wife and fellow musician, Senora May.

== Accolades ==
Year	Award show	Category	Nominated work	Result	Ref
2020	Grammy Awards	Best Country Solo Performance	"All Your'n"	Nominated	

== Music video ==
The official music video for "All Your'n" was released on July 22, 2019 as a comedic exercise in rural psychedelia. It was directed by Matt Stawicki and features illustration work by Serge Gay Jr. and comic artist Tony Moore. Critics noted that the video's mind-bending, hallucinatory visuals contrast with the straightforward, romantic message of the track. Commentators from Wide Open Country highlighted that the video visualizes Childers' comfort with "trippy" aesthetics, comparing his style to the Grateful Dead rather than traditional country tropes.

== Live performances ==
Childers joined Olivia Rodrigo onstage to perform "All Your'n" during the Guts World Tour in Lexington in 2024.

== Chart performance ==
Despite the immense popularity of the song, "All Your'n" debuted and peaked at only No. 46 on the Billboard Hot Country Songs chart dated for August 17, 2019 following the release of Country Squire. It also reached the Top 20 of Adult Alternative Airplay chart.

The song received a 6× Platinum certification from the Recording Industry Association of America (RIAA) in 2026, and has sold 21,000 digital copies in the United States as of January 2020.

== Charts ==
Weekly chart performance for "All Your'n"
Chart (2019)	Peak position
US Adult Alternative Airplay (Billboard)	16
US Hot Country Songs (Billboard)	46

== Certifications ==
Certifications for "All Your'n"
Region	Certification	Certified units/sales
Canada (Music Canada)	2× Platinum	160,000^{‡}
New Zealand (RMNZ)	Platinum	30,000^{‡}
United Kingdom (BPI)	Silver	200,000^{‡}
United States (RIAA)	6× Platinum	6,000,000^{‡}
^{‡} Sales+streaming figures based on certification alone.
