= Long Violent History =

Studio album by Tyler Childers
- Released: September 18, 2020
- Genre: Country, bluegrass Old Time
- Label: Hickman Holler
- Producer: Tyler Childers

Tyler Childers chronology
Country Squire (2019)	Long Violent History (2020)	Can I Take My Hounds to Heaven? (2022)

Long Violent History is the fourth studio album by American country music singer Tyler Childers. It is an album centralized on the title track, a protest song against racism. Childers released the album in 2020 with no publicity other than a six-minute video.

== Content ==
In September 2020, Childers announced the album's release via a video message posted on YouTube. In the six-minute video, Childers addresses the album's central themes in opposition of racism, especially when viewed from the perspective of "rural white" listeners. The first eight songs on the album are traditional fiddle tunes, and then it ends with the lyrical title track, a self-penned protest song. According to NPR, Childers cited the Black Lives Matter movement, along with the Battle of Blair Mountain in 1921, as the two main influences of the album's themes.

== Critical reception ==
Stephen Thomas Erlewine of AllMusic wrote that it was "the rare protest album that doesn't need words to shout, and it's all the more powerful because of it."

== Track listing ==
All tracks public domain except "Long Violent History", written by Tyler Childers.

1. "Send In the Clowns" (instrumental) - 4:08
2. "Zollie's Retreat" (instrumental) - 2:25
3. "Squirrel Hunter" (instrumental) - 3:59
4. "Sludge River Stomp" (instrumental) - 4:38
5. "Midnight on the Water" (instrumental) - 4:08
6. "Camp Chase" (instrumental) - 3:54
7. "Jenny Lynn" (instrumental) - 3:10
8. "Bonaparte's Retreat" (instrumental) - 2:46
9. "Long Violent History" - 3:10

== Charts ==
Chart (2020)	Peak position
US Billboard 200	45
US Top Country Albums (Billboard)	6
