= Adeem the Artist =

American singer-songwriter (born 1988)

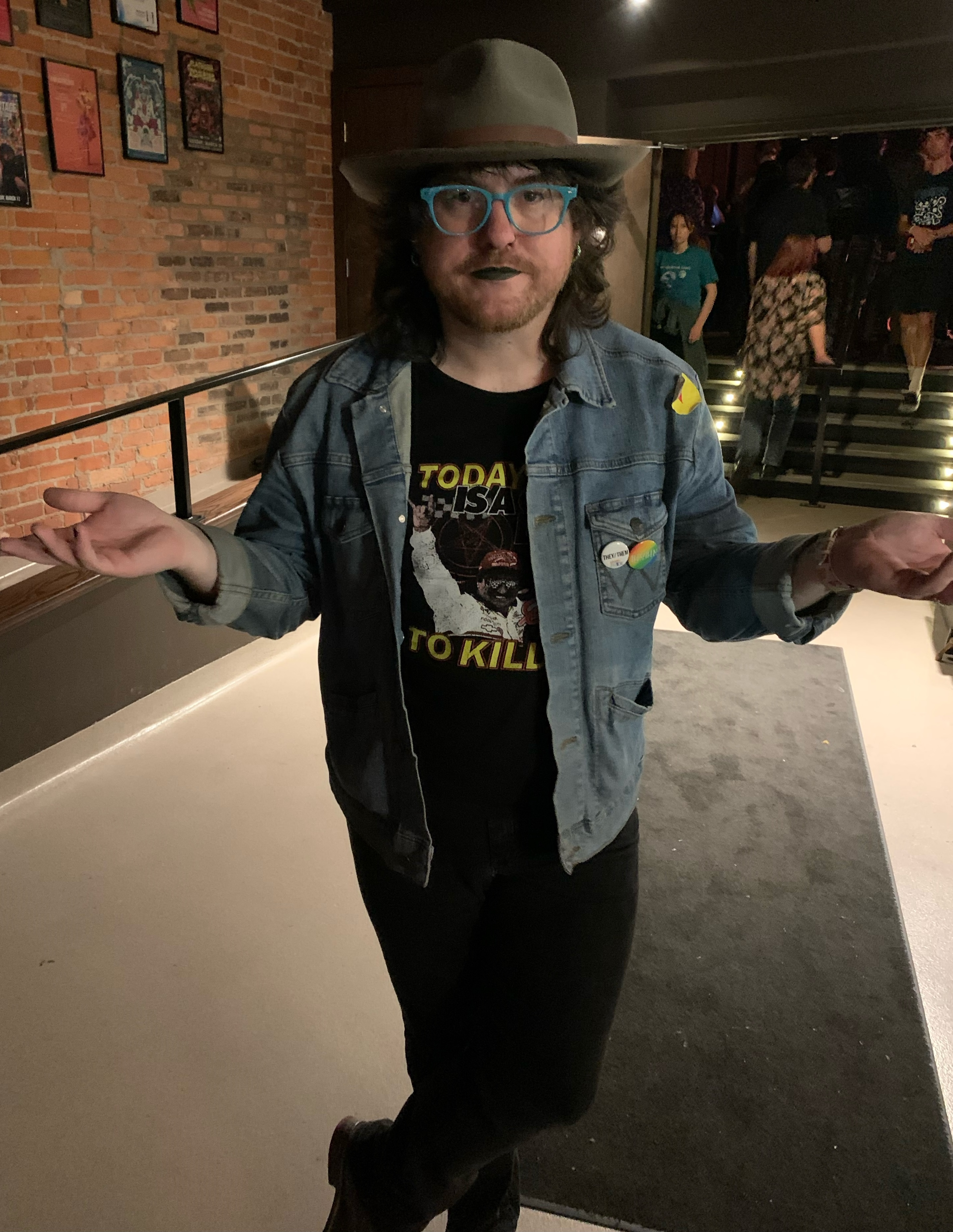
- Adeem the Artist in April 2023

Background information
- Also known as: Adeem Maria; Adeem Bingham
- Born: 1988 (age 37–38); Locust, North Carolina, U.S.
- Origin: Knoxville, Tennessee, U.S.
- Genres: Country, indie
- Occupation: Singer-songwriter
- Instruments: Vocals, guitar
- Years active: 2002-present
- Labels: Four Quarters, Thirty Tigers
- Spouse: Hannah Bingham
- Website: adeemtheartist.com

Adeem Maria Bingham (born 1988), known professionally as Adeem the Artist, is an American country music singer. They (Note: Adeem is nonbinary and uses they/them pronouns.) have released nine studio albums and four EPs.

== Early life ==
Adeem the Artist was born in 1988. They were born in Locust, North Carolina but when they were 12 years old, their family moved to Syracuse, New York. When Adeem was in their 20s, they began performing on cruise ships. They later moved to Knoxville, Tennessee with the intent of being a pastor, but later abandoned this plan and began recording music. In 2016, they performed tribute shows for John Prine and Joni Mitchell in Knoxville.

In 2020, Adeem became an editor and columnist for Country Queer, writing the publication's "Buried Treasure" feature, a bi-weekly column that focused on the work of lesser known queer musical artists.

== Career ==
In 2021, after releasing several independent albums on Bandcamp, Adeem released the album Cast-Iron Pansexual. Adeem largely funded the album through Patreon and wrote most of its songs in 2020. They premiered their tracks on the website Audio Femme that March.

Rolling Stone editors Jon Freeman and Joseph Hudak selected the title track of Cast Iron Pansexual as a "pick of the week" after the album's release, stating that the song "stakes out their place as a born Southerner armed with a radical outlook and a brain that won't just ease up". American Songwriter described Adeem as having a "scruffy timbre". The editors of this site also selected "I Wish You Would've Been a Cowboy", a response to Toby Keith's 1993 hit "Should've Been a Cowboy". Adeem co-wrote the song, which is critical of Keith's patriotism, with Palestinian-American poet Summer Awad. Steve Wildsmith of The Daily Times wrote that the album had a "rich currency of exploration, past-life condemnation and present-day illumination." Following the success of this album, they toured with American Aquarium in 2021. In April 2022, Adeem signed with Thirty Tigers after contacting the label's owner on Twitter. They announced plans to release their first album for the label later in the year. "Middle of a Heart" was also released from the album in October 2022, followed by "Run This Town" a month later. Their first Thirty Tigers album, White Trash Revelry, was released in December 2022.

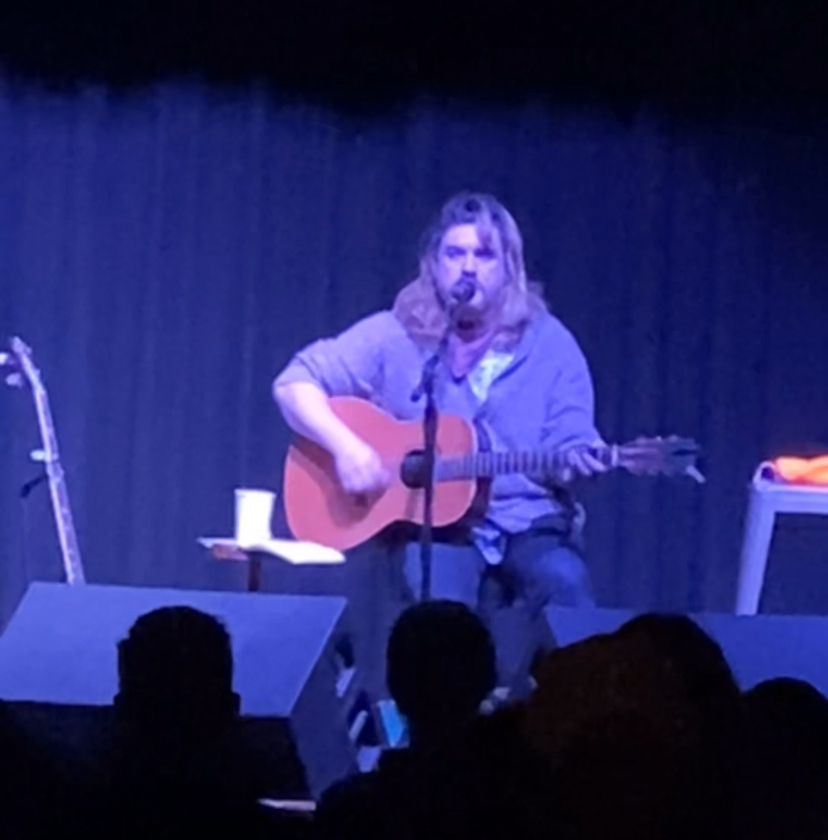
Adeem the Artist performing at Motorco Music Hall in Durham, North Carolina in 2024

In 2023, Adeem the Artist was nominated for Emerging Act of the Year at the Americana Music Honors & Awards. Adeem the Artist released a new single titled "One Night Stand" from their next Thirty Tigers album Anniversary.

On September 9, 2025, Adeem the Artist announced in a social media post that "As of right now, Atlanta Pride will be my final performance, and then Adeem the Artist is on hiatus.”

== Personal life ==
Adeem the Artist identifies as non-binary and uses they/them pronouns. They are also pansexual and married to their wife, Hannah Bingham. Adeem told The Daily Times in 2021 that some of the themes of Cast Iron Pansexual deal with their own gender and sexual identity issues, particularly since they grew up in a Christian household in the Southern United States.

== Discography ==
=== Albums ===
- The Living Room Tapes (2011)
- armour. (2012)
- [syracuse.] (2013)
- Kyle Adem Is Dead (2016)
- Live Recordings (2017)
- Forgotten Songs & American Dreams (2019)
- Cast Iron Pansexual (2021)
- White Trash Revelry (2022)
- Anniversary (2024)
- notes from the inside (2026)
- Survival Strategies Vol. 1: Enmeshment (2026)

=== EPs ===
- Beautiful Dreamer (2014)
- The Owl (2017)
- The Flamingo (2017)
- Home Recordings Vol. 2 (2023)

=== Singles ===
- "Sidewalk" (2015)
- "5th Avenue Homicide" (2017)
- "The Last Summer" (2017)
- "Scruffy Little Christmas" (2017)
- "Pandemic Days" (2020)
- "Ashes in Flight" (2020)
- "Tiger Prince of Knoxville" (2020)
- "Asheville Blues" (2021)
- "Merry Christmas, Urgent Care" (2021)
- "I Wish You Would've Been a Cowboy" (2021)
- "Going to Hell" (2022)
- "ICU" (2023)
- "What If We Stayed"(2023)
