= In Your Love =

2023 song by Tyler Childers

Single by Tyler Childers

from the album Rustin' in the Rain
- Released: July 27, 2023
- Genre: Country
- Length: 3:46
- Label: Hickman Holler/RCA Nashville
- Songwriters: Tyler Childers; Geno Seale
- Producers: Tyler Childers; The Food Stamps

Tyler Childers singles chronology
"All Your'n" (2019)	"In Your Love" (2023)	"Nose on the Grindstone" (2025)

"In Your Love" is a song written, recorded, and produced by American country music singer Tyler Childers. The song is the lead single to Childers' album Rustin' in the Rain. Upon release, "In Your Love" received media attention for its music video, depicting a relationship between two gay coal miners in the 1950s. The song received nominations at the 66th Annual Grammy Awards for Best Country Solo Performance, Best Country Song, and Best Music Video.

== Content ==
Tyler Childers wrote the song "In Your Love" in 2023 with Geno Seale. It is the first single from Childers's album Rustin' in the Rain, released on September 8.

The song's corresponding music video was written by poet Silas House and directed by Bryan Schlam. This video received significant media attention upon release, due to it portraying a relationship between two gay male coal miners in 1950s Kentucky. Childers told National Public Radio (NPR) interviewer Ann Powers that he was inspired to include gay themes in the video because of a gay cousin whom he considered a musical mentor. Actors Colton Haynes and James Scully portray the couple in the video. The video features Haynes and Scully's characters developing a relationship before Scully's character dies of black lung disease at the end.

== Chart performance ==
On the Billboard charts dated for August 12, 2023, "In Your Love" debuted at number seven on the Billboard Hot Country Songs chart and number 43 on the Hot 100. The song is Childers' highest peak on the former, and his first entry on the latter.

=== Weekly charts ===
Weekly chart performance for "In Your Love"
Chart (2023–2024)	Peak position
Canada Hot 100 (Billboard)	91
Canada Country (Billboard)	56
Global 200 (Billboard)	131
US Billboard Hot 100	43
US Country Airplay (Billboard)	43
US Hot Country Songs (Billboard)	7
US Rock & Alternative Airplay (Billboard)	37

=== Year-end charts ===
2023 year-end chart performance for "In Your Love"
Chart (2023)	Position
US Hot Country Songs (Billboard)	66

2024 year-end chart performance for "In Your Love"
Chart (2024)	Position
US Hot Country Songs (Billboard)	57

== Certifications ==
Certifications for "In Your Love"
Region	Certification	Certified units/sales
United States (RIAA)	2× Platinum	2,000,000^{‡}
^{‡} Sales+streaming figures based on certification alone.
