= Rustin' in the Rain =

Studio album by Tyler Childers
- Released: September 8, 2023
- Genre: Country; honky-tonk; neotraditional country
- Length: 28:01
- Label: Hickman Holler Records; RCA
- Producer: Tyler Childers; The Food Stamps (Note: The Food Stamps consists of Craig Burletic, Chase Lewis, Rodney Elkins, James Barker, Jesse Wells, and C. J. Cain.)

Tyler Childers chronology
Can I Take My Hounds to Heaven? (2022)	Rustin' in the Rain (2023)	Snipe Hunter (2025)

Singles from Rustin' in the Rain
- 1. "In Your Love" Released: July 27, 2023

Rustin' in the Rain is the sixth album by American singer Tyler Childers. It was released on September 8, 2023, through Childers' own independent label Hickman Holler Records and major label RCA. Produced by Childers and his backing band the Food Stamps, the album includes the single "In Your Love".

== Content ==
The album's lead single is "In Your Love". This song's corresponding music video received media attention for its storyline, depicting a romance between two coal miners in the 1950s. Childers also covers Kris Kristofferson's "Help Me Make It Through the Night" and S.G. Goodman's "Space and Time". He told the Associated Press that he conceptualized the album as if he were pitching songs to Elvis Presley.

== Musical style and composition ==
Rustin' in the Rain has been described as a country, honky-tonk, and neotraditional country album, with elements of progressive country, gospel, outlaw country, country pop, and country soul.

== Critical reception ==
Professional ratings
Review scores
Source	Rating
AllMusic	4.5/5 stars
American Songwriter	3.5/5 stars
Paste	8.0/10
Pitchfork	7.6/10
PopMatters	8/10

Stephen Thomas Erlewine of AllMusic found influence of 1970s outlaw country in Childers's delivery, but thought that the inclusion of "Phone Calls and Emails", as well as the video for "In Your Love", showed more modern influence. Of said influence, Erlewine wrote, "he's explicitly treating country music as a genre that evolves, one that can encompass all manners of stories by building upon what's already been laid at the foundation. With its empathetic heart and kinetic kick, Rustin' in the Rain illustrates how vibrant and vital that idea can be." Pitchfork's Nadine Smith called it "impossible to mistake for anything but country music" and despite not being "a break with country music[,] it is a light cast on its history, a recognition of what it has been and can become".

== Track listing ==
All tracks written by Tyler Childers except as noted.

1. "Rustin' in the Rain" – 3:36
2. "Phone Calls and Emails" – 4:16
3. "Luke 2:8–10" – 3:03
  - featuring Margo Price, Erin Rae, and S.G. Goodman
4. "Help Me Make It Through the Night" (Kris Kristofferson) – 4:08
5. "Percheron Mules" – 4:30
  - featuring the Travelin' McCourys
6. "In Your Love" (Childers, Geno Seale) – 3:45
7. "Space and Time" (S.G. Goodman) – 4:42
  - featuring S.G. Goodman and Erin Rae

== Personnel ==
Musicians

- Tyler Childers – vocals
- C. J. Cain – acoustic guitar
- Craig Burletic – double bass (all tracks), background vocals (track 3), fretless bass (5)
- Rod Elkins – drums (all tracks), tambourine (1, 2, 5, 6), shaker (2–4, 7), background vocals (3)
- James Barker – electric guitar (1, 5), pedal steel guitar (2–4, 6, 7)
- Jesse Wells – electric guitar (all tracks); banjo, mandolin (6)
- Chase Lewis – piano (all tracks), background vocals (3, 5), synthesizer (6, 7)
- Margo Price – background vocals (3)
- S.G. Goodman – background vocals (3, 7)
- Erin Rae – background vocals (3, 7)
- Ronnie McCoury – vocals, background vocals, mandolin (5)
- Jason Carter – vocals, background vocals (5)
- Alan Bartram – vocals, background vocals (5)

Technical

- Tyler Childers – production
- The Food Stamps – production
- Pete Lyman – mastering
- Kenny Miles – mixing, engineering
- Tom Ashpitel – engineering
- James Barker – engineering
- Gordon Davidson – engineering
- Sean Sullivan – engineering
- Jesse Wells – engineering
- Joe Wyatt – engineering
- Daniel Bacigalupi – engineering assistance
- Chase Lewis – miscellaneous production (1, 3, 5)

== Charts ==
=== Weekly charts ===
Weekly chart performance for Rustin' in the Rain
Chart (2023)	Peak position
Australian Country Albums (ARIA)	25
Canadian Albums (Billboard)	63
Scottish Albums (OCC)	9
UK Album Downloads (OCC)	43
UK Country Albums (OCC)	9
US Billboard 200	10
US Americana/Folk Albums (Billboard)	2
US Top Country Albums (Billboard)	4

=== Year-end charts ===
Year-end chart performance for Rustin' in the Rain
Chart (2023)	Position
US Top Country Albums (Billboard)	70
