= White Trash Revelry =

2022 album by Adeem the Artist

Studio album by Adeem the Artist
- Released: December 2, 2022
- Venue: Pink Moon Sound, Knoxville, Tennessee
- Genre: Country
- Length: 40:40
- Label: Four Quarters/Thirty Tigers
- Producer: Kyle Crownover

Adeem the Artist chronology
Cast Iron Pansexual (2021)	White Trash Revelry (2022)	Anniversary (2024)

White Trash Revelry is a studio album by American musician Adeem the Artist. It was released on December 2, 2022, by Four Quarters and Thirty Tigers.

== Content ==
In September 2022, Adeem the Artist released the song and music video "Going to Hell", which they confirmed as the first single from their upcoming album. This was followed by "Middle of a Heart" in October, and "Run This Town" in November.

Prior to these songs' release, Adeem the Artist funded the album through a crowdfunding project which they called "Redneck Fundraiser". Matt Wickstrom of No Depression also noted lyrical themes of Southern upbringing and social justice in tracks such as "Heritage of Arrogance". According to Adeem the Artist, the song "My America" was written as an answer song to Aaron Lewis' "Am I the Only One".

== Critical reception ==
Rick Quinn of Popmatters wrote that "There is an authentic empathy that permeates this album and lends genuine gravity to the songs held within." Quinn also noted themes throughout the lyrics such as condemnation of racism, culture of the Southern United States, religion, and sexuality. John Moore of Glide magazine called the album "a deeply satisfying mix of songs", praising the songwriting on the singles in particular.

== Track listing ==
All tracks written by Adeem the Artist (Adeem Bingham); "Redneck, Unread Hicks" co-written by Jett Holden and Zach Russell.

1. "Carolina" - 3:24
2. "For Judas" - 4:28
3. "Heritage of Arrogance" - 4:29
4. "Painkillers & Magic" - 3:35
5. "Run This Town" - 2:45
6. "Baptized in Well Spirits" - 3:18
7. "Middle of a Heart" - 4:01
8. "Going to Hell" - 2:59
9. "Redneck, Unread Hicks" - 3:54
10. "Books & Records" - 4:29
11. "My America" - 3:18

== Personnel ==
Adapted from liner notes.

Musicians

- Adeem the Artist (Adeem Maria) - vocals, acoustic guitar
- Ellen Angelico - pedal steel guitar, baritone guitar, electric guitar, mandolin, acoustic guitar, keyboards
- Jake Blount - banjo
- Craig Burletic - bass guitar
- Mya Byrne - lap steel guitar
- Giovanni Carnuccio III - drums
- Joy Clark - electric guitar
- Jessye DeSilva - piano
- Alyssa Donyae - background vocals on "Painkillers & Magic"
- Jason Hanna - electric guitar
- Caleb Haynes - background vocals on "Painkillers & Magic"
- Jett Holden - background vocals on "Redneck, Unread Hicks" and "Painkillers & Magic"
- Dale Mackey - background vocals on "Painkillers & Magic"
- Lizzie No - harp; background vocals on "Painkillers & Magic"
- Zach Russell - background vocals on "Redneck, Unread Hicks"
- Kristin Webber - fiddle
- William Wright - accordion, synthesizer

Technical

- Robbie Artress - mixing, engineering
- Kyle Crownover - producer
- John Naclerio - mastering
