= Hermanos Gutiérrez =

Ecuadorian-Swiss band

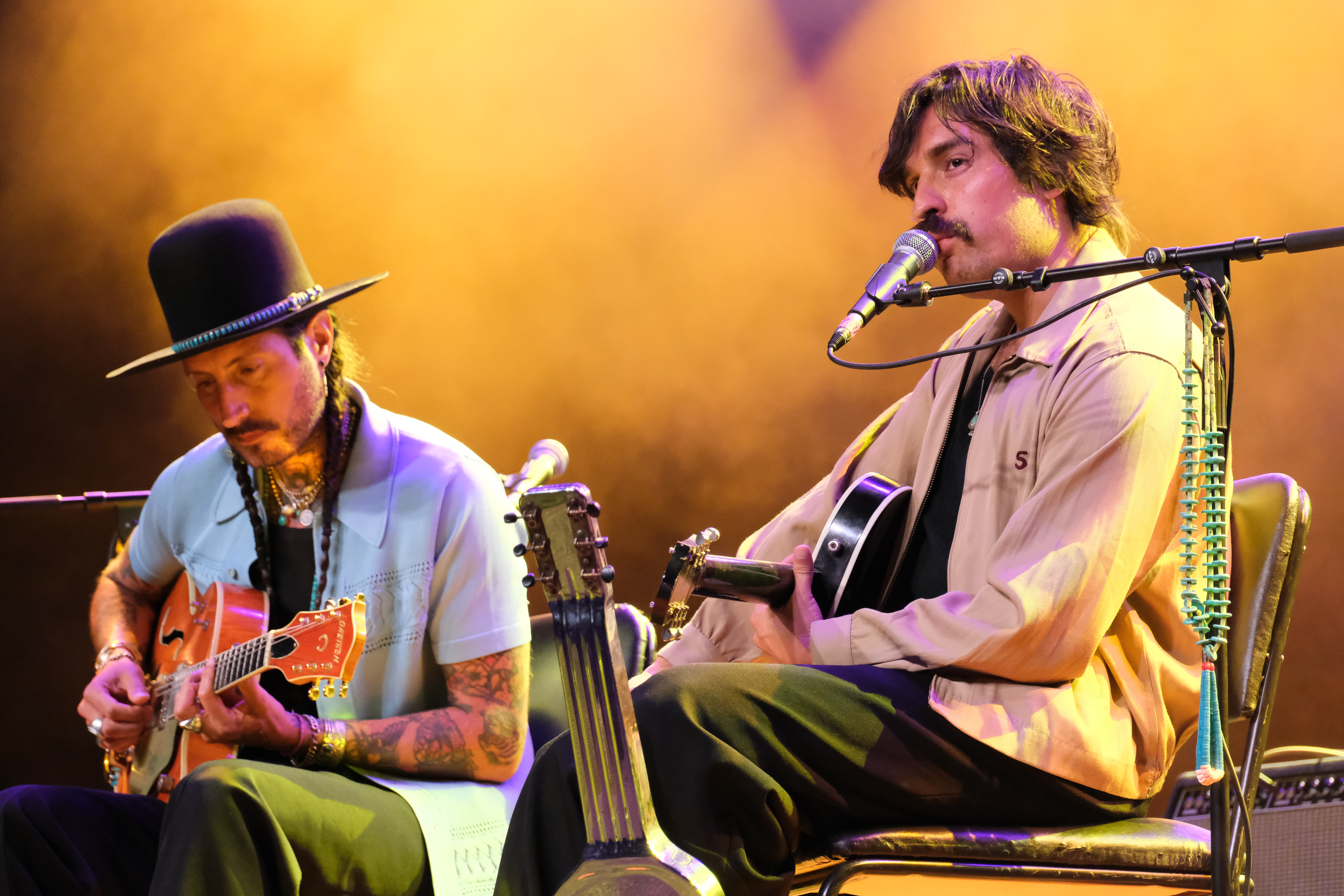
- Hermanos Gutiérrez at the 2025 Istanbul Jazz Festival

Background information
- Origin: Zürich, Switzerland
- Genres: Instrumental; Latin; Western
- Years active: 2015–present
- Label: Easy Eye Sound
- Members: Alejandro Gutiérrez; Estevan Gutiérrez
- Website: www.hermanosgutierrez.ch

Hermanos Gutiérrez (Spanish for "Gutiérrez Brothers") is a Latin instrumental band formed in 2015 in Zürich by Ecuadorian-Swiss brothers Alejandro Gutiérrez (guitar and lap steel) and Estevan Gutiérrez (guitar and percussion). The US label Easy Eye Sound has released the band's fifth album El Bueno y el Malo in 2022, their sixth album Sonido Cósmico in 2024, and their seventh album Los Ojos Del Cóndor in 2026.

== History ==
Alejandro and Estevan Gutiérrez, two of four siblings, were raised by an Ecuadorian mother and a Swiss father in Switzerland, and often visited family in Playas, Ecuador. Around age nine, Estevan learned to play classical guitar in Latin styles such as milonga and salsa, and as a surfer was later inspired by surf rocker Jack Johnson. Alejandro, who is eight years younger, taught himself guitar by watching tutorial videos on YouTube. The Hermanos Gutiérrez band traces its origins to a jam session in Alejandro's apartment in Zürich during a visit from Estevan in 2015.

The band's first three albums (8 Años, El Camino de mi Alma, and Hoy Como Ayer) drew broadly from the world of Latin music. A visit to Mexico and the Southwest US in February 2020 inspired their fourth album, Hijos del Sol, which incorporated more Western sounds. An eight-minute music video for the title track came out in advance of the album's release on 25 September 2020.

El Bueno y el Malo, the band's first non-indie project, was recorded in Nashville in collaboration with Dan Auerbach of the Black Keys and released by his label Easy Eye Sound on 28 October 2022. The album (and its title) were inspired by Ennio Morricone's The Good, the Bad and the Ugly soundtrack. The album was critically acclaimed and has been described as mentally transporting listeners to Spaghetti Western landscapes. Songs from El Bueno y el Malo comprised Hermanos Gutiérrez's set list in an NPR Tiny Desk Concert in January 2023. That year, Auerbach was nominated for the Grammy Award for Non-Classical Producer of the Year in part for his work with Hermanos Gutiérrez.

Auerbach is also the producer of Sonido Cósmico, five compositions from which the musicians performed live in the studio for KEXP in June 2025. They collaborated with Natalia Lafourcade on her 2025 album Cancionera, which won the 2025 Latin Grammy Award for best singer/songwriter album.

In 2025, Auerbach returned to produce a collaboration between Leon Bridges and Hermanos Gutierrez on their first English-language track titled "Elegantly Wasted". The video for Elegantly Wasted was nominated for Best Music Video in the shorts category at the 2026 Tribeca Film Festival.

In 2026, Jack Johnson invited Alejandro and Estevan to accompany him for the score to his documentary Surfilmusic that premiered at SXSW. The band's album Los Ojos Del Cóndor was released on 25 September 2026.

== Musical style ==
The band's genre has evolved into a mix of Latin and Western music. Jon Freeman of Rolling Stone describes the band's "minimal approach to their instrumental guitar music ... It's music that sings without needing a singer, that's lyrical without needing words". Brian Sandford writes in The Santa Fe New Mexican that the band's songs "alternate between shuffling and brooding, spooky and solitary".

Alejandro Gutiérrez plays electric guitar and lap steel guitar, while Estevan Gutiérrez plays electric guitar and percussion (bongos, maracas, etc.). The brothers have described having a musical chemistry such that they are able to compose together without needing to talk; NPR writes, "They weave intricate guitar lines over each other that intertwine to the point that if you close your eyes you can't tell where one begins and the other ends". Of their proficiency with "rhythm and timing", Auerbach has jokingly commented, "They are Swiss".

Early influences include Julio Jaramillo; later influences include film composers such as Ennio Morricone and Gustavo Santaolalla.

== Discography ==
- Adapted from Bandcamp.

=== Studio albums ===
List of studio albums
Title	Album details	Peak chart positions	
Title	Album details	US	AUS
8 Años	Released: 6 January 2017; Label: Self-released; Format: LP, digital download, streaming	—	—
El Camino de mi Alma	Released: 23 May 2018; Label: Self-released; Format: LP, digital download, streaming	—	—
Hoy Como Ayer	Released: 27 September 2019; Label: Self-released; Format: LP, digital download, streaming	—	—
Hijos del Sol	Released: 25 September 2020; Label: Self-released; Format: LP, digital download, streaming	—	—
El Bueno y el Malo	Released: 28 October 2022; Label: Easy Eye Sound/Concord; Format: LP, CD, digital download, streaming	—	—
Sonido Cósmico	Released: 14 June 2024; Label: Easy Eye Sound/Concord; Format: LP, CD, digital download, streaming	193	—
Los Ojos Del Cóndor	Released: 25 September 2026; Label: Easy Eye Sound/Concord; Format: LP, CD, digital download, streaming	171	88

=== Compilation albums ===
List of compilation albums
Title	Album details
Eternamente	Released: 3 December 2021; Label: Self-released; Format: LP, digital download, streaming
