= Purgatory (Tyler Childers album) =

Studio album by Tyler Childers
- Released: August 4, 2017
- Studio: Butcher Shoppe (Nashville, Tennessee)
- Genre: Country; bluegrass; honky-tonk; Appalachian; Americana; folk
- Length: 37:41
- Label: Hickman Holler Records; Thirty Tigers
- Producer: Sturgill Simpson; David R. Ferguson

Tyler Childers chronology
Bottles and Bibles (2011)	Purgatory (2017)	Country Squire (2019)

Singles from Purgatory
- 1. "Lady May" Released: June 9, 2017; 2. "Whitehouse Road" Released: June 23, 2017; 3. "Universal Sound" Released: July 7, 2017

Purgatory is the second studio album by American country music singer Tyler Childers. It was released in August 2017 through two independent labels, Childers' own Hickman Holler Records and Nashville-based label Thirty Tigers. The album was certified platinum by the RIAA.

== Musical style and composition ==
Purgatory has been described as a country, bluegrass, honky-tonk, Appalachian, Americana, and folk album, with its Appalachian storytelling compared to albums such as Steve Earle's Copperhead Road, Sturgill Simpson's Metamodern Sounds in Country Music, and Patty Loveless' Mountain Soul.

== Reception ==
Professional ratings
Aggregate scores
Source	Rating
Metacritic	82/100
Review scores
Source	Rating
AllMusic	4/5 stars
American Songwriter	4/5 stars
Record Collector	5/5 stars
The Independent	3/5 stars

The album has received a Metacritic rating of 82 based on 6 reviews, indicating "universal acclaim".

The album has sold 638,178 copies, both CD and streamable, in the United States as of December 2020.

=== Accolades ===
Publication	Accolade	Rank	Ref.
Noisey	Top 100 Albums of 2017	75	
NPR Music	Top 50 Albums of 2017	39	
Rolling Stone	Top 40 Best Country and Americana Albums of 2017	14	

== Album cover artwork ==
The album cover artwork, drawn by an artist local to Kentucky, references the geographic outline of Lawrence County, Kentucky, Childers' birthplace.

Additionally, the coloration and shape are reminiscent of Kentucky agate, Kentucky's official state gemstone and a type of agate found in Estill, Jackson, Powell, Madison, and Rockcastle counties in Kentucky that has distinctive red, black, yellow, and gray bands due to its derivation from the Mississippian Borden Formation.

== Track listing ==
No.	Title	Length
1.	"I Swear (To God)"	3:20
2.	"Feathered Indians"	3:45
3.	"Tattoos"	3:23
4.	"Born Again"	3:28
5.	"Whitehouse Road"	4:41
6.	"Banded Clovis"	4:19
7.	"Purgatory"	2:46
8.	"Honky Tonk Flame"	4:57
9.	"Universal Sound"	3:42
10.	"Lady May"	3:04

== Charts ==
=== Weekly charts ===
Chart (2017)	Peak position
US Billboard 200	71
US Top Country Albums (Billboard)	9
US Americana/Folk Albums (Billboard)	2
US Independent Albums (Billboard)	3

Chart (2024)	Peak position
Canadian Albums (Billboard)	78

=== Year-end charts ===
Chart (2019)	Position
US Top Country Albums (Billboard)	61
US Folk Albums (Billboard)	21

Chart (2020)	Position
US Top Country Albums (Billboard)	19
US Folk Albums (Billboard)	3

Chart (2021)	Position
US Billboard 200	149
US Top Country Albums (Billboard)	14
US Folk Albums (Billboard)	3

Chart (2022)	Position
US Billboard 200	113
US Independent Albums (Billboard)	16
US Top Country Albums (Billboard)	11
US Folk Albums (Billboard)	4

Chart (2023)	Position
US Billboard 200	97
US Independent Albums (Billboard)	13
US Top Country Albums (Billboard)	21
US Folk Albums (Billboard)	6

Chart (2024)	Position
US Billboard 200	133
US Top Country Albums (Billboard)	29

Chart (2025)	Position
US Top Country Albums (Billboard)	30

== Certifications ==
Region	Certification	Certified units/sales
Canada (Music Canada)	Platinum	80,000^{‡}
United States (RIAA)	Platinum	1,000,000^{‡}
^{‡} Sales+streaming figures based on certification alone.

== Usage in film ==
Multiple songs from Tyler Childers' Purgatory have been used in movies and television shows. In the hit series, Yellowstone, "Lady May" is featured in season 3 episode 2.

== See also ==
- Lawrence County, Kentucky
