= Can I Take My Hounds to Heaven? =

Studio album by Tyler Childers
- Released: September 30, 2022
- Genres: Country; gospel
- Length: 108:44
- Label: Hickman Holler
- Producer: Tyler Childers

Tyler Childers chronology
Long Violent History (2020)	Can I Take My Hounds to Heaven? (2022)	Rustin' in the Rain (2023)

Can I Take My Hounds to Heaven? is the fifth studio album by American country music singer Tyler Childers. It was released on September 30, 2022, via Hickman Holler. The album consists of three discs, each containing different remixes of eight gospel music songs.

== Content ==
The album is a gospel music project featuring Childers' touring band, The Food Stamps. The band recorded eight different gospel songs, each in three different versions: a "Hallelujah" version, a "Jubilee" version, and a "Joyful Noise" version. The "Hallelujah" versions were recorded live in the studio; the "Jubilee" versions incorporate horn sections and string sections; and the "Joyful Noise" versions incorporate remixes and sampling. "Old Country Church" is a cover of a Hank Williams song, while "Purgatory" is a re-recording of a song from Childers' 2017 album of the same name.

== Critical reception ==
Stephen Thomas Erlewine of AllMusic rated the album 4.5 out of 5 stars, praising the musicianship of The Food Stamps as well as the influences of soul music and Dixieland jazz present in the "Jubilee" versions of songs.

== Track listing ==
"The Old Country Church", "Two Coats", and "Jubilee" are public domain; all other tracks written by Tyler Childers.

Can I Take My Hounds to Heaven? track listing
#	Title	Length (Hallelujah Version)	Length (Jubilee Version)	Length (Joyful Noise Verson)
1.	"The Old Country Church"	4:46	4:47	3:09
2.	"Can I Take My Hounds to Heaven?"	4:04	4:15	4:41
3.	"Two Coats"	3:25	3:30	6:15
4.	"Purgatory"	4:24	4:23	4:55
5.	"The Way of the Triune God"	3:28	3:27	3:10
6.	"Angel Band"	6:12	6:12	5:17
7.	"Jubilee"	4:29	4:37	4:24
8.	"Heart You've Been Tendin'"	4:45	4:46	5:23
Total length		35:33	35:57	37:14

== Charts ==
=== Weekly charts ===
Chart performance for Can I Take My Hounds to Heaven?
Chart (2022)	Peak position
US Billboard 200	8
US Top Country Albums (Billboard)	3

=== Year-end charts ===
Year-end chart performance for Can I Take My Hounds to Heaven?
Chart (2023)	Position
US Top Country Albums (Billboard)	75
