= Country Squire =

Studio album by Tyler Childers
- Released: August 2, 2019
- Studios: Butcher Shoppe (Nashville, Tennessee)
- Genres: Honky-tonk; country; neotraditional country
- Length: 35:10
- Labels: Hickman Holler; RCA
- Producers: Sturgill Simpson; David R. Ferguson

Tyler Childers chronology
| Purgatory (2017) | Country Squire (2019) | Long Violent History (2020) |

Singles from Country Squire
- 1. "House Fire" Released: May 16, 2019; 2. "All Your'n" Released: June 21, 2019

Country Squire is the third studio album and major label debut by American country musician Tyler Childers. Recorded at the Butcher Shoppe in Nashville, the album was produced by Sturgill Simpson and was released on August 2, 2019, jointly through Childers' own independent label Hickman Holler Records and major label RCA.

The album received a Metacritic rating of 85 based on six reviews, indicating universal acclaim.

== Commercial performance ==
Country Squire debuted at No. 1 on Billboard's Top Country Albums and Americana/Folk Albums, his first on No. 1 on these charts. It sold 24,000 in traditional albums, 32,000 in equivalent album units in the first week. As of March 2020, the album has sold 65,400 copies in the United States.

== Background ==
Following the critical success of his breakthrough 2017 album Purgatory, Childers signed an exclusive licensing deal with major label RCA Records and announced his follow up album, named Country Squire, on May 16, 2019. On the same day, the music video for "House Fire" was released. As part of his deal with RCA, Childers would own the copyright through his own Hickman Holler Records and have creative control. Additionally, country singer-songwriter Sturgill Simpson was re-recruited to produce Country Squire.

== Musical style and composition ==
Country Squire has been described as a honky-tonk, country, and neotraditional country album, that is compared to the styles of its predecessor, Purgatory.

== Critical reception ==
Professional ratings
Aggregate scores
| Source | Rating |
|---|---|
| Metacritic | 85/100 |
Review scores
| Source | Rating |
| AllMusic | 4/5 stars |
| Paste | 4/5 stars |
| Pitchfork | 7.8/10 |

Country Squire was met with immediate critical acclaim. Writing for Pitchfork, Stephen Deusner remarks that "[Childers] has a remarkable facility with telling details, which pepper Country Squire as vividly they did his 2017 breakout Purgatory."

=== Accolades ===
"All Your'n" was nominated for Best Solo Country Performance at the 2019 Grammy Awards, but lost to Willie Nelson and his song "Ride Me Back Home".

== Track listing ==
All tracks are written by Tyler Childers.

| No. | Title | Length |
|---|---|---|
| 1. | "Country Squire" | 3:21 |
| 2. | "Bus Route" | 3:07 |
| 3. | "Creeker" | 5:01 |
| 4. | "Gemini" | 2:32 |
| 5. | "House Fire" | 3:52 |
| 6. | "Ever Lovin' Hand" | 4:38 |
| 7. | "Peace of Mind" | 4:42 |
| 8. | "All Your'n" | 3:38 |
| 9. | "Matthew" | 4:13 |
| Total length: | | 35:04 |

== Personnel ==
From Country Squire liner notes.

Musicians

- Tyler Childers - vocals (all tracks), acoustic guitar (all tracks), hand claps (8)
- Stuart Duncan - fiddle (all tracks), mandolin (2, 4, 7, 9), banjo (5, 9), hand claps (8)
- Miles Miller - drums (all tracks except 9), background vocals (all tracks except 9), washboard (4), hand claps (8)
- Russ Pahl - electric guitar (1, 3, 4, 5, 6, 8), pedal steel guitar (1, 3, 7, 8), baritone guitar (1, 4), Dobro (2, 7), classical guitar (7), acoustic guitar (8, 9), Jew's harp (2), mandolin (5), hand claps (8)
- David Roe - bass guitar (all tracks), hand claps (8)
- Mike Rojas - piano (1, 3, 4, 6), accordion (2), Hammond B-3 organ (3, 5, 6), clavinet (4), synthesizer (5), Wurlitzer electric piano (7)
- Sturgill Simpson - background vocals (2), hand claps (8)
- Bobby Wood - Wurlitzer electric piano (3, 8), piano (7, 8), Hammond B-3 organ (8), harmonium (9)

Technical

- Daniel Bacigalupi - assistant
- David R. Ferguson - producer, engineer, mixing
- Pete Lyman - mastering
- Senora May - photography
- Colonel Tony Moore - illustration
- Sturgill Simpson - producer
- Sean Sullivan - engineer
- Jimbo Valentine - album layout

== Charts ==
=== Weekly charts ===
| Chart (2019) | Peak position |
|---|---|
| Australian Digital Albums (ARIA) | 44 |
| Canadian Albums (Billboard) | 86 |
| Scottish Albums (Official Charts) | 40 |
| UK Country Albums (Official Charts) | 1 |
| US Billboard 200 | 12 |
| US Top Country Albums (Billboard) | 1 |

=== Year-end charts ===
| Chart (2019) | Position |
|---|---|
| US Top Country Albums (Billboard) | 64 |

| Chart (2023) | Position |
|---|---|
| US Top Country Albums (Billboard) | 67 |

== Certifications ==
| Region | Certification | Certified units/sales |
|---|---|---|
| Canada (Music Canada) | Gold | 40,000^{‡} |
| United States (RIAA) | Platinum | 1,000,000^{‡} |
^{‡} Sales+streaming figures based on certification alone.
