= Snipe Hunter =

Studio album by Tyler Childers
- Released: July 25, 2025
- Genre: Country
- Length: 53:59
- Labels: Hickman Holler Records; RCA
- Producer: Rick Rubin

Tyler Childers chronology
Rustin' in the Rain (2023)	Snipe Hunter (2025)

Singles from Snipe Hunter
- 1. "Nose on the Grindstone" Released: June 12, 2025

Snipe Hunter is the seventh studio album by American country musician Tyler Childers, released on July 25, 2025, via Hickman Holler Records and RCA Records. The album was produced by Rick Rubin. The album received widespread critical acclaim upon release.

== Background and recording ==
Childers began writing Snipe Hunter after the release of his 2023 album Rustin' in the Rain. He recorded the album primarily in Malibu and Hawaii, with producer Rick Rubin encouraging an unstructured, organic creative process.

According to Childers, the album reflects a period of artistic and personal liberation, embracing both reverence for tradition and curiosity for the unknown.

Snipe Hunter was officially announced in May 2025, accompanied by the release of "Nose on the Grindstone".

The album was released on July 25, 2025, via Childers' Hickman Holler Records and RCA Records.

== Critical reception ==
Professional ratings
Aggregate scores
Source	Rating
Metacritic	87/100
Review scores
Source	Rating
AllMusic	4/5 stars
Holler	9.1/10
Paste	8.5/10
Pitchfork	7.8/10
Rolling Stone	4.5/5 stars
Slant Magazine	4.5/5 stars

Snipe Hunter received widespread acclaim from critics upon release. At Metacritic, which assigns a rating out of 100 to reviews from professional publications, the album received a weighted average score of 87, based on six reviews, which the website categorized as "universal acclaim".

Holler awarded the album a 9.1 out of 10, calling it "Childers at his most musically adventurous yet still deeply rooted" and praising its balance of "silence and chaos." Caitlin Hall of Holler described the album as "expansive, strange, but unshakably grounded," noting its vulnerable character work and seamless blend of rural imagery and cosmic questions. Fellow Holler reviewer Alli Patton rated it a 9.5/10, calling Snipe Hunter "an unsightly, eviscerating, necessary process," and praised the song "Tirtha Yatra" as "the most magnetic song I've ever heard."

Rolling Stone highlighted the album's inventive range, noting its unexpected detours and its capacity to hold space for both "bootlegger fiddle music" and spiritual chants. Reviewer Daisy Innes drew comparisons to Sturgill Simpson's Sound & Fury and declared Snipe Hunter a strong contender for album of the year. Pitchfork awarded the album a 7.8, celebrating its unpredictability and Rubin's production style.

On October 5, 2026, the Grammy-winning track "Bitin' List" received RIAA Gold Certification.

== Track listing ==
All tracks are written by Tyler Childers.

No.	Title	Length
1.	"Eatin' Big Time"	4:45
2.	"Cuttin' Teeth"	3:45
3.	"Oneida"	4:38
4.	"Getting to the Bottom"	4:30
5.	"Bitin' List"	2:56
6.	"Nose on the Grindstone"	2:55
7.	"Watch Out"	3:44
8.	"Down Under"	4:47
9.	"Poachers"	4:09
10.	"Snipe Hunt"	3:09
11.	"Tirtha Yatra"	4:42
12.	"Tomcat and a Dandy"	4:42
13.	"Dirty Ought Trill"	4:31
Total length:		53:59

== Personnel ==
- Tyler Childers – vocals (all tracks), percussion, additional producer (1), acoustic guitar (2–4, 6, 9), electric guitar (8), fiddle, background vocals (12)
- James Barker – pedal steel guitar (tracks 1–4, 8, 10, 11, 13), electric guitar (2, 5, 7), acoustic guitar (9), background vocals (13)
- Craig Burletic – bass (tracks 1–5, 7–11), background vocals (2, 5, 8, 13), background vocals (13)
- C. J. Cain – acoustic guitar (tracks 1, 4, 5, 8–10), electric guitar (2, 3, 5, 7, 11)
- Kory Caudill – piano (tracks 1, 3, 8, 9), synthesizer (1, 4), organ (2, 5–7, 9–11), Wurlitzer piano (4, 11, 13), harpsichord (4), background vocals (5, 8), clavinet (7, 11), synth bass (8), cymbal (12)
- Rod Elkins – drums (tracks 1–5, 7–11, 13), percussion (1–5, 7–9, 11, 13)
- Matt Rowland – organ (track 1), piano (2, 11), accordion (3, 9, 10, 12), vocoder (4, 5, 7), Wurlitzer piano (7), background vocals (8, 9, 12, 13), synthesizer (8), mandolin (9), programming (13)
- Jesse Wells – electric guitar (tracks 1, 2, 4, 5, 7, 8, 13), fiddle (3, 11, 12), banjo (5, 9), mandolin, background vocals (9), acoustic guitar (10)
- Nick Sanborn – additional producer (tracks 1–5, 7, 10–12), additional engineer (1–5, 7, 11, 12), percussion (1, 2, 7, 9, 13), synthesizer (1, 8, 9, 12, 13), tubular bells (8), vocoder (9), organ (12)
- Alex Sauser-Monnig – background vocals (tracks 2, 4, 5, 7, 13)
- Amelia Meath – background vocals (tracks 2, 4, 5, 7, 13)
- Emma Delvante – tubular bells (track 4)
- Oliver Child-Lanning – harp (tracks 5, 13), additional producer (13)
- Kenny Miles – background vocals (track 9)
- Rick Rubin – producer (all tracks)
- Ryan Hewitt – engineer (tracks 1–3, 6, 9, 11–13)
- Louis Remenapp – assistant engineer (tracks 1–3, 6, 9–13)
- Alli Rogers – engineer (tracks 1–9, 11–13)
- Shawn Everett – mixing (tracks 1–13)
- Ian Gold – assistant mixing (tracks 1–5, 7–13)
- Greg Calbi – mastering (tracks 1–13)
- Steve Fallone – mastering (tracks 1–5, 7–13)
- Jason Lader – engineer (tracks 4, 5, 7, 8)
- Tyler Harris – engineer (tracks 4, 5, 7, 8)
- Cole Elias – assistant engineer (tracks 4, 5, 7, 8)

== Charts ==
=== Weekly charts ===
Weekly chart performance for Snipe Hunter
Chart (2025)	Peak position
Canadian Albums (Billboard)	38
Scottish Albums (Official Charts)	78
UK Country Albums (Official Charts)	3
US Billboard 200	7
US Americana/Folk Albums (Billboard)	1
US Top Country Albums (Billboard)	2

=== Year-end charts ===
Year-end chart performance for Snipe Hunter
Chart (2025)	Position
US Top Country Albums (Billboard)	60
