= Tyler Childers =

American singer and songwriter (born 1991)

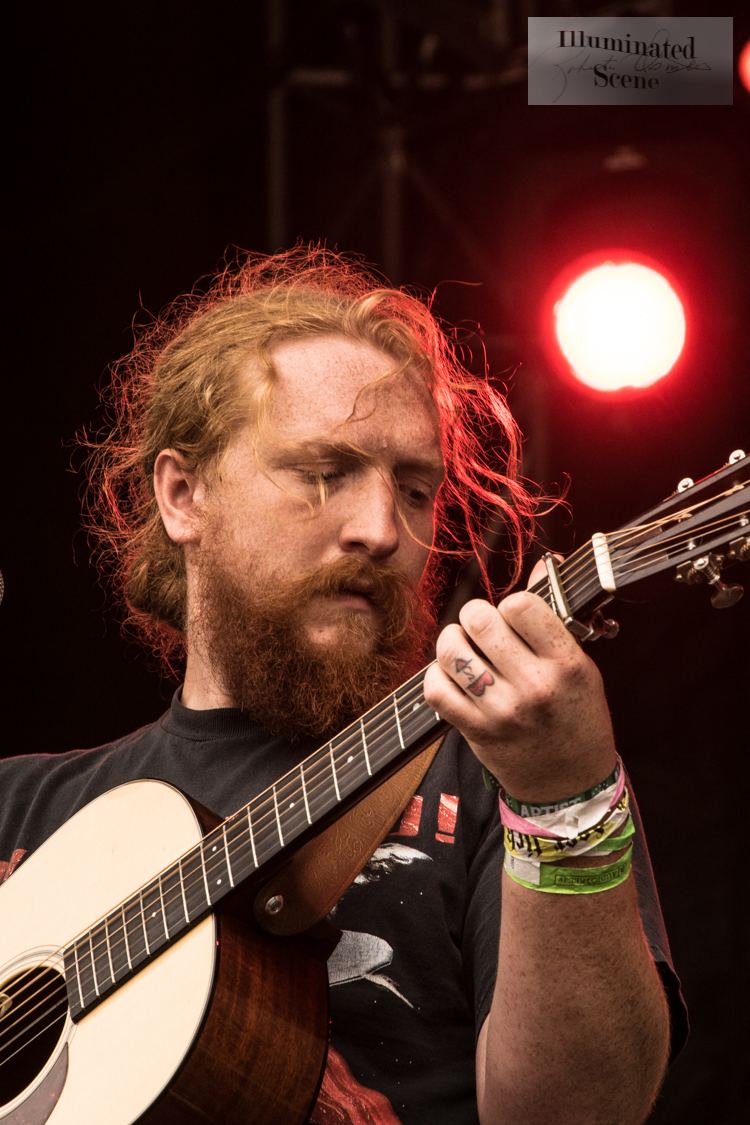
- Childers in 2018

Background information
- Born: Timothy Tyler Childers; June 21, 1991 (age 35); Lawrence County, Kentucky, U.S.
- Origin: Louisa, Kentucky
- Genres: Neotraditional country; bluegrass; folk; honky-tonk
- Occupations: Singer-songwriter; philanthropist
- Instruments: Vocals; guitar
- Years active: 2010–present
- Labels: Hickman Holler Records; Thirty Tigers; RCA
- Member of: Tyler Childers and the Food Stamps
- Spouse: Senora May (m. 2015)
- Website: tylerchildersmusic.com

Timothy Tyler Childers (/tʃɪldərz/ CHILL-dərz; born June 21, 1991) is an American country singer-songwriter. His music has been described as a mix of neotraditional country, bluegrass, folk, and honky-tonk. His breakthrough studio album, Purgatory (2017), was named one of the best albums of the year by several publications, and earned Childers an Americana Music Award. He subsequently received Grammy Award nominations for his albums Long Violent History (2020) and Rustin' in the Rain (2023) and the singles "All Your'n" (2019) and "In Your Love" (2023), the latter of which was his first top 10 hit on Billboard's Hot Country Songs chart.

== Early life ==
Tyler Childers was born and grew up in Lawrence County, Kentucky. His father worked in the coal industry and his mother is a nurse. He was born with clubfoot and had to undergo surgeries to remedy the condition when he was 18 months old, and again when he was aged five. He learned to sing in church as a member of the choir. Childers started to play guitar and write songs at approximately 13 years of age. He attended Lawrence County High School (LCHS) and transferred to Paintsville High School, Johnson County where he graduated in 2009. Fellow country musicians from Johnson County include Chris Stapleton (Staffordsville), Loretta Lynn (Butcher Hollow), and Crystal Gayle; Sturgill Simpson, a known acquaintance of Childers, is from Jackson, Kentucky in nearby Breathitt County, Kentucky.

Childers studied for a semester at Western Kentucky University and then enrolled at Bluegrass Community and Technical College for a few semesters. He dropped out of college and worked odd jobs for some time while pursuing a music career.

== Career ==
Childers began performing in Lexington, Kentucky, and Huntington, West Virginia. In 2011, when he was 19, Childers released his first album, Bottles and Bibles. In 2012, he uploaded an acoustic recording of "Jersey Giant" to SoundCloud with vocals from Senora May. He released two EPs recorded in 2013 at Red Barn Radio, a radio show from Lexington. The two EPs were later released as one recording called Live on Red Barn Radio I & II after the success of his album Purgatory; they reached No. 5 on Heatseekers Albums. He performed with his backing band, The Food Stamps.

=== Purgatory (2017) ===
Childers' first success was with his 2017 album Purgatory. It was produced by Sturgill Simpson and David Ferguson and recorded at The Butcher Shoppe in Nashville. Simpson also played guitar and sang backing vocals on the album; Miles Miller is on drums, Stuart Duncan on fiddle and Russ Pahl played other instruments. It debuted at No. 1 on Billboard's Heatseekers Albums chart, No. 17 on the Country albums chart and No. 4 on the Americana/Folk albums chart. In September 2018, Childers won Emerging Artist of the Year at the 2018 Americana Music Honors & Awards; he gave an acceptance speech noted for its criticism of the Americana genre label saying after the awarder mispronounced his last name that "as a man who identifies as a country music singer, I feel Americana ain't no part of nothing and is a distraction from the issues that we're facing on a bigger level as country music singers. It kind of feels like purgatory."

=== Country Squire (2019) ===
Country Squire, a second album under the Hickman Holler label and Childers' third overall, was released on August 2, 2019. The album was also produced by Simpson and Ferguson. The video of the lead single from the album House Fire was released on May 16, 2019. "All Your'n", the second single from the album, was nominated for Best Country Solo Performance at the 62nd Annual Grammy Awards.

=== Long Violent History (2020) ===
On September 18, 2020, Childers released Long Violent History, an album consisting mainly of traditional fiddle tracks. The album closes with the title track, which discusses racism, civil unrest, and police brutality. He released a video message to accompany the song; in it he discussed his intention for the album in general and the title track in particular, calling for empathy above all else. He said the profits from the album would support underserved communities in the Appalachian region, through Childers' Hickman Holler Appalachian Relief Fund.

=== Can I Take My Hounds to Heaven? (2022) ===
On September 30, 2022, Childers released a triple album Can I Take My Hounds to Heaven?. The album is divided into three parts: Hallelujah, Jubilee, and Joyful Noise; eight songs are presented in three ways (Jubilee versions for example have additional instruments added to the Hallelujah version). The album charted at No. 8, which is Childers' first top 10 album on Billboard 200, based on 27,000 units earned in the first week. In that same year, he gave his song "Jersey Giant" to Elle King, which she included in her album Come Get Your Wife.

=== Rustin' in the Rain (2023) ===
Childers released a new single in July 2023 titled "In Your Love", which was co-written with Geno Seale. The release was followed by the announcement of a new upcoming album Rustin' in the Rain. The accompanying music video for the single was written by Silas House and depicts a relationship between two gay coal miners in the 1950s. Rustin' in the Rain was released on September 8, 2023. The album features a cover of S.G. Goodman's song "Space and Time". Childers was announced as one of the headliners in the 2024 Bourbon & Beyond festival in his home state, taking place in Louisville in September.

Childers contributed a previously unreleased live version of the song "Bus Route" from his Country Squire album to the "Cardinals At The Window" benefit album, which was released in 2024. All proceeds from "Cardinals At The Window" go directly to organizations assisting western North Carolina communities impacted by Hurricane Helene.

=== Snipe Hunter (2025) ===
Childers released his seventh studio album, Snipe Hunter, on July 25, 2025, where he blended Appalachian music, experimental rock, psychedelia, and gospel music. In the album, he explored themes such as death, faith, personal myth, and regional identity.

== Musical style ==
Childers' music is influenced by his home state of Kentucky and its connection to country music and bluegrass. He often writes about coal mining, which was his father's occupation, and its effects. Rebecca Bengal, writing for The Guardian, described Childers' songs as a "counternarrative to the outsiders who seek to perpetuate stereotypes of backwardness and poverty." He emphasizes lyrical content in songs, comparing the songwriting process to telling short stories about past relationships and his youth.

In January 2020, Childers spoke of his position on Americana during an interview with World Cafe:

Everybody always talks about the state of country music and puts down commercial country and [says] "something's gotta be done" and "we need to be elevating artists that are doing more traditional country." But then we're not calling those artists country artists, they're getting put into this Americana thing. It is what it is, and I don't really know how to define what Americana is. We're our own thing, it's a new time, and I don't know what it's called but I've been calling it country, y'know? I think, a lot of times, it's kind of become just a costume.

== Personal life ==
In 2015, Childers married fellow performer Senora May, who is also a Kentucky native. In May 2022, they announced that they were expecting their first child. Tyler and Senora started Hickman Holler Appalachian Relief Fund in 2020 to bring awareness and financial support for philanthropic efforts in the Appalachian region.

While not explicitly affiliated with any political party, Tyler Childers expressed support for coal miners' rights as well as same-sex marriage, in the music video of his 2023 song "In Your Love". He supported Democratic candidate Charles Booker's campaign for U.S. Senate in 2022 and sang at the second inauguration of Kentucky governor Andy Beshear, also a Democrat. In June 2025, Childers performed his song "Long Violent History" on stage for the first time during a show in Los Angeles. The choice to perform the song five years after its release was interpreted as a statement in support of June 2025 Los Angeles protests against the Trump administration's immigration raids.

Childers has described himself in 2020 as a "recovering alcoholic" who had "drunk and drugged himself around the world playing music for the better part of eleven years." He noted in September 2020 that he had six months of sobriety. During a New Year's Eve performance in Lexington, Kentucky in 2023, Childers referenced drinking his last beer a day before he and Sturgill Simpson played a show at Rupp Arena on February 28, 2020.

== The Food Stamps band members ==
=== Current members ===
- Craig Burletic – bass guitar
- Rodney Elkins – drums
- James Barker – pedal steel guitar
- "The Professor" Jesse Wells – other guitars, fiddle
- CJ Cain – guitar
- Kory Caudill – keyboards
- Matt Rowland – piano, synthesizer, accordion, vocoder

== Discography ==
Studio albums

- Bottles and Bibles (2011)
- Purgatory (2017)
- Country Squire (2019)
- Long Violent History (2020)
- Can I Take My Hounds to Heaven? (2022)
- Rustin' in the Rain (2023)
- Snipe Hunter (2025)

== Awards and nominations ==
| Award | Year | Category | Nominee/Work | Result | Ref. |
|---|---|---|---|---|---|
| American Music Awards | 2026 | Best Americana / Folk Artist | Himself | Nominated | |
| Americana Music Honors & Awards | 2018 | Emerging Artist of the Year | Himself | Won | |
| Americana Music Honors & Awards | 2023 | Album of the Year | Can I Take My Hounds to Heaven? | Won | |
| Grammy Awards | 2020 | Best Country Solo Performance | "All Your'n" | Nominated | |
| Grammy Awards | 2022 | Best Folk Album | Long Violent History | Nominated | |
| Grammy Awards | 2024 | Best Country Solo Performance | "In Your Love" | Nominated | |
| Grammy Awards | 2024 | Best Country Song | "In Your Love" | Nominated | |
| Grammy Awards | 2024 | Best Music Video | "In Your Love" | Nominated | |
| Grammy Awards | 2024 | Best Country Album | Rustin' in the Rain | Nominated | |
| Grammy Awards | 2024 | Best Americana Performance | "Help Me Make It Through the Night" | Nominated | |
| Grammy Awards | 2026 | Best Country Solo Performance | "Nose on the Grindstone" | Nominated | |
| Grammy Awards | 2026 | Best Country Duo/Group Performance | "Love Me Like You Used To Do" (with Margo Price) | Nominated | |
| Grammy Awards | 2026 | Best Contemporary Country Album | Snipe Hunter | Nominated | |
| Grammy Awards | 2026 | Best Country Song | "Bitin' List" | Won | |
