= Tammy Wynette singles discography =

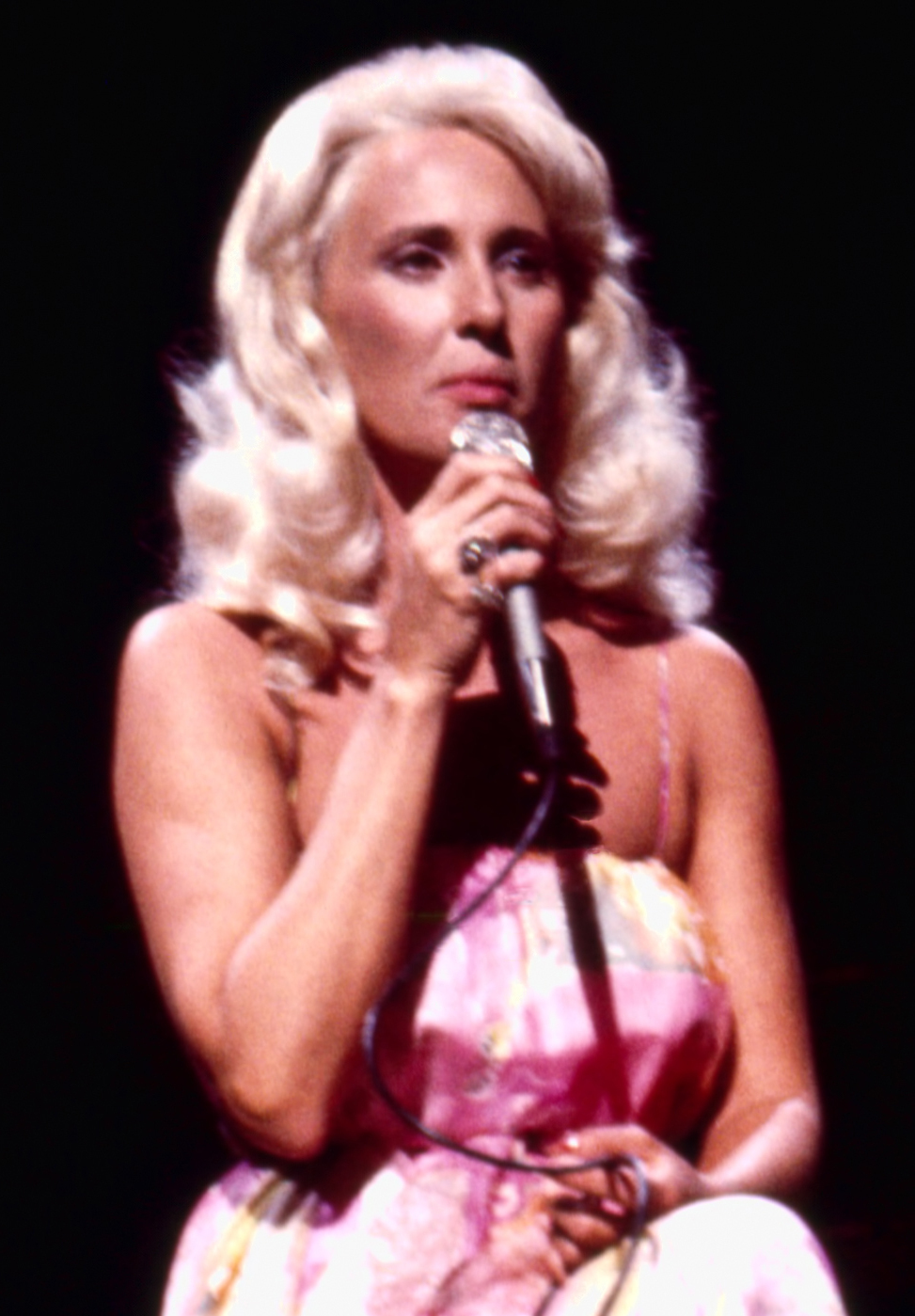
- Tammy Wynette, 1977
- Singles: 65
- Music videos: 6
- Featured singles: 2
- Promotional singles: 3

The singles discography of American country musician Tammy Wynette contains 65 singles, 6 music videos, 3 promotional singles and 2 featured singles. Wynette signed with Epic Records in 1966 and her debut single "Apartment No. 9" was released the same year. Her single "Your Good Girl's Gonna Go Bad" (1967) became a major hit, reaching number 3 on the Billboard Hot Country Singles chart. Its follow-up singles: "My Elusive Dreams" (a duet with David Houston), "I Don't Wanna Play House", "Take Me to Your World" and "D-I-V-O-R-C-E", became number 1 hits on the Hot Country Singles chart.

Wynette's next single release, "Stand by Your Man", would become her biggest solo hit. The song peaked at number 1 on the country singles chart and crossed over to number 19 on the Billboard Hot 100. Over the next several years, Wynette had several number 1 hits on the Billboard country chart including "Singing My Song", "The Ways to Love a Man", "He Loves Me All the Way" and "Kids Say the Darndest Things". After several more top ten singles, "'Til I Can Make It on My Own" and "You and Me" both reached number 1 on the country songs chart in 1976. Wynette continued having a series of top 10 singles through the remainder of the decade, including "(Let's Get Together) One Last Time" (1977) and "Womanhood" (1978).

Beginning in 1980, Wynette's singles began peaking outside the top 10. She continued having major hits in the top 20 of the Billboard country chart with "He Was There (When I Needed You)" (1980) and "Crying in the Rain" (1981). Wynette's 1982 single "Another Chance" reached the top 10 of the country chart as well as a cover version of "Sometimes When We Touch" in 1985. In 1987, she had two major hits from the album Higher Ground including "Your Love". In 1991, Wynette collaborated with British electronic band The KLF on the song "Justified and Ancient". The song became a major international hit single. Wynette's final chart appearance was a reissue of "Stand by Your Man", which peaked at number 56 in 1998.

== Singles ==
=== 1960s ===
List of singles, with selected chart positions, certifications and other relevant details
Title	Year	Peak chart positions									Certifications	Album
Title	Year	US	US AC	US Cou.	AUS	CAN	CAN AC	CAN Cou.	ND	UK	Certifications	Album
"Apartment No. 9"	1966	—	—	44	—	—	—	—	—	—		Your Good Girl's Gonna Go Bad
"Your Good Girl's Gonna Go Bad"	1967	—	—	3	—	—	—	—	—	—		Your Good Girl's Gonna Go Bad
"My Elusive Dreams" (with David Houston)	1967	89	—	1	65	—	—	—	—	—		My Elusive Dreams
"I Don't Wanna Play House" (Note: "I Don't Wanna Play House" was re-released and then charted in the United Kingdom in 1975. It was spawned from the album, The Best of Tammy Wynette (1975).)	1967	—	—	1	60	—	—	3	25	37		Take Me to Your World/ I Don't Wanna Play House
"Take Me to Your World"	1967	—	—	1	—	—	—	1	—	—		Take Me to Your World/ I Don't Wanna Play House
"It's All Over" (with David Houston)	1968	—	—	11	78	—	—	—	—	—		My Elusive Dreams
"D-I-V-O-R-C-E" (Note: "D-I-V-O-R-C-E" was re-released and then charted in the United Kingdom in 1975. It was spawned from the album, The Best of Tammy Wynette (1975).)	1968	63	—	1	59	74	—	1	9	12		D-I-V-O-R-C-E
"Stand by Your Man" (Note: "Stand by Your Man" was re-released and then charted in the United Kingdom in 1975. It was spawned from the album, The Best of Tammy Wynette (1975).)	1968	19	11	1	8	15	—	1	1	1	BPI: Gold; RMNZ: Gold	Stand by Your Man
"Singing My Song"	1969	75	—	1	71	65	35	1	—	—		Tammy's Greatest Hits
"The Ways to Love a Man"	1969	81	18	1	71	78	33	1	—	—		The Ways to Love a Man
"I'll See Him Through"	1969	100	—	2	91	—	—	3	—	—		Tammy's Touch
"—" denotes a recording that did not chart or was not released in that territory.

=== 1970s ===
List of singles, with selected chart positions, and other relevant details
Title	Year	Peak chart positions						Album
Title	Year	US	US AC	US Cou.	AUS	CAN AC	CAN Cou.	Album
"He Loves Me All the Way"	1970	97	—	1	—	—	2	Tammy's Touch
"Run Woman Run"	1970	92	—	1	—	—	1	The First Lady
"The Wonders You Perform"	1970	— (Note: "The Wonders You Perform" did not enter the Billboard Hot 100, but peaked at number 4 on the Bubbling Under the Hot 100 chart.)	—	5	—	—	2	Non-album single
"One Happy Christmas"	1970	—	—	—	—	—	—	Christmas with Tammy
"We Sure Can Love Each Other"	1971	— (Note: "We Sure Can Love Each Other" did not enter the Billboard Hot 100, but peaked at number 3 on the Bubbling Under the Hot 100 chart.)	—	2	—	—	1	We Sure Can Love Each Other
"Good Lovin' (Makes It Right)"	1971	— (Note: "Good Lovin' (Makes It Right)" did not enter the Billboard Hot 100, but peaked at number 11 on the Bubbling Under the Hot 100 chart.)	—	1	—	—	1	Tammy's Greatest Hits, Volume II
"Bedtime Story"	1971	86	—	1	—	—	1	Bedtime Story
"Reach Out Your Hand (And Touch Somebody)"	1972	—	—	2	—	—	1	Bedtime Story
"My Man (Understands)"	1972	—	—	1	—	—	1	My Man
"'Til I Get It Right"	1972	— (Note: "'Til I Get It Right" did not enter the Billboard Hot 100, but peaked at number 6 on the Bubbling Under the Hot 100 chart.)	—	1	—	—	1	My Man
"Kids Say the Darndest Things"	1973	72	—	1	80	—	2	Kids Say the Darndest Things
"One Final Stand"	1973	—	—	—	—	—	—	Another Lonely Song
"Another Lonely Song"	1973	—	—	1	—	—	1	Another Lonely Song
"No Charge" (credited as Tammy and Tina)	1974	—	—	—	—	—	—	George & Tammy & Tina
"Woman to Woman"	1974	—	—	4	—	—	1	Woman to Woman
"(You Make Me Want to Be a) Mother"	1975	—	—	4	—	—	9	Tammy Wynette's Greatest Hits, Volume 3
"I Still Believe in Fairy Tales"	1975	—	—	13	—	—	—	I Still Believe in Fairy Tales
"'Til I Can Make It on My Own"	1976	84	41	1	—	37	1	'Til I Can Make It on My Own
"You and Me"	1976	— (Note: "You and Me" did not enter the Billboard Hot 100, but peaked at number 1 on the Bubbling Under the Hot 100 chart.)	28	1	—	19	6	You and Me
"(Let's Get Together) One Last Time"	1977	—	—	6	—	—	8	Let's Get Together
"One of a Kind"	1977	—	—	6	—	—	17	One of a Kind
"I'd Like to See Jesus (On the Midnight Special)"	1978	—	—	26	—	—	27	Womanhood
"Womanhood"	1978	—	—	3	—	—	3	Womanhood
"They Call It Making Love"	1979	—	—	6	—	—	6	Just Tammy
"No One Else in the World"	1979	—	—	7	—	—	5	Just Tammy
"—" denotes a recording that did not chart or was not released in that territory.

=== 1980s ===
List of singles, with selected chart positions, and other relevant details
Title	Year	Peak chart positions		Album
Title	Year	US Cou.	CAN Cou.	Album
"He Was There (When I Needed You)"	1980	17	28	Only Lonely Sometimes
"Starting Over"	1980	17	41	Only Lonely Sometimes
"Cowboys Don't Shoot Straight (Like They Used To)"	1981	21	36	You Brought Me Back
"Crying in the Rain"	1981	18	11	You Brought Me Back
"Another Chance"	1982	8	3	Soft Touch
"You Still Get to Me in My Dreams"	1982	16	42	Soft Touch
"A Good Night's Love"	1982	19	39	Good Love & Heartbreak
"I Just Heard a Heart Break (And I'm So Afraid It's Mine)"	1983	46	—	Good Love & Heartbreak
"Unwed Fathers"	1983	63	—	Even the Strong Get Lonely
"Still in the Ring"	1983	63	—	Even the Strong Get Lonely
"Lonely Heart"	1984	40	—	Non-album single
"Sometimes When We Touch" (with Mark Gray)	1985	6	24	Sometimes When We Touch
"You Can Lead a Heart to Love (But You Can't Make It Fall)"	1985	48	—	Sometimes When We Touch
"Alive and Well"	1986	53	47	Non-album single
"Your Love"	1987	12	13	Higher Ground
"Talkin' to Myself Again"	1987	16	23	Higher Ground
"Beneath a Painted Sky"	1988	25	28	Higher Ground
"Next to You"	1988	51	—	Next to You
"Thank the Cowboy for the Ride"	1989	66	51	Next to You
"—" denotes a recording that did not chart or was not released in that territory.

=== 1990s ===
List of singles, with selected chart positions, and other relevant details
Title	Year	Peak chart positions		Album
Title	Year	US Cou.	CAN Cou.	Album
"Let's Call It a Day Today"	1990	57	66	Heart Over Mind
"I'm Turning You Loose"	1990	—	—	Heart Over Mind
"What Goes with Blue"	1991	56	—	Heart Over Mind
"We're Strangers Again" (with Randy Travis)	1991	49	75	Best Loved Hits
"Silver Threads and Golden Needles" (with Loretta Lynn and Dolly Parton)	1993	68	—	Honky Tonk Angels
"Girl Thang" (with Wynonna)	1994	67	—	Without Walls
"Every Breath You Take" (with Sting)	1994	—	—	Without Walls
"Stand by Your Man" (re-release)	1998	56	—	Stand by Your Man
"—" denotes a recording that did not chart or was not released in that territory.

== As a featured artist ==
List of singles, with selected chart positions, certifications and other relevant details
Title	Year	Peak chart positions									Certifications	Album
Title	Year	US	US Cou.	AUS	CAN	GER	IRE	NZ	SWE	UK	Certifications	Album
"While the Feeling's Good" (Wayne Newton with Tammy Wynette)	1989	—	63	—	—	—	—	—	—	—		Coming Home
"Justified & Ancient (Stand by the JAMS)" (The KLF featuring Tammy Wynette)	1991	11	—	3	8	3	3	1	1	2	ARIA: Gold; BPI: Silver	The White Room
"—" denotes a recording that did not chart or was not released in that territory.

== Promotional singles ==
List of singles, showing all relevant details
Title	Year	Album	Ref.
"White Christmas"	1973	Christmas with Tammy	
"A Woman's Need" (with Elton John)	1994	Without Walls	
"Stand by Your Man"	2001	—N/a	

== Music videos ==
List of music videos, showing year released and director
Title	Year	Director(s)	Ref.
"Beneath a Painted Sky"	1988	Jim May	
"Next to You"	1988	Jim May	
"Let's Call It a Day Today"	1990	Burt Reynolds	
"Justified and Ancient (Stand by the JAMS)" (The KLF featuring Tammy Wynette)	1991	not available	
"Silver Threads and Golden Needles" (with Loretta Lynn and Dolly Parton)	1993	Deaton-Flanigen	
"Precious Memories"	1994	Stan Strickland	
