= Tammy Wynette albums discography =

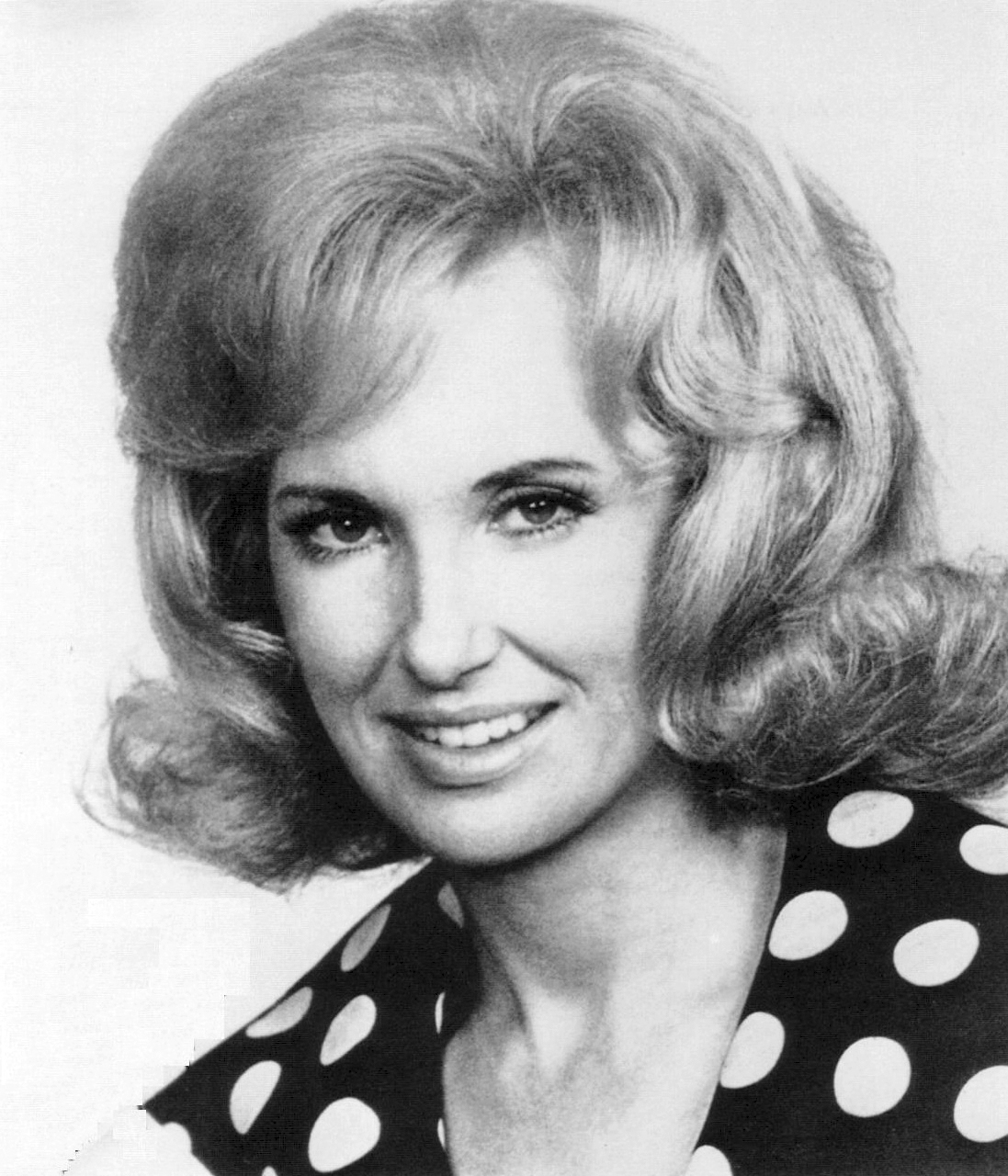
- Tammy Wynette, early 1970s
- Studio albums: 33
- Compilation albums: 55
- Box sets: 2
- Other album appearances: 6

The albums discography of American country music artist Tammy Wynette contains 33 studio albums, 55 compilation albums, 2 box sets and has appeared on 6 additional albums. In 1966, Wynette signed a recording contract with Epic Records. The following year, her debut studio album entitled Your Good Girl's Gonna Go Bad was issued, peaking at number 7 on the Billboard Country Albums chart. The same year, she collaborated with David Houston on the studio album My Elusive Dreams, which reached number 11 on the same chart. The following year, her fourth studio album D-I-V-O-R-C-E peaked at number 1 on the Country Albums list, spending two weeks at the top spot. Wynette's fifth studio record Stand by Your Man (1969) reached number 2 on the country albums chart and peaked at number 43 on the Billboard 200 albums list. Wynette's first compilation released entitled Tammy's Greatest Hits (1969) would spend 61 weeks on the Billboard 200 before peaking at number 37.

Into the 1970s, Wynette released several studio albums per year. Reaching the top ten on the Top Country Albums chart during this time included Tammy's Touch (1970), The Ways to Love a Man (1970) and My Man (1972). After several more studio releases, her 1976 albums, 'Til I Can Make It on My Own and You and Me, reached the top five of the Country Albums chart. Wynette issued four more studio albums before the end of decade, including One of a Kind (1977) and Just Tammy (1979).

By the 1980s, Wynette's commercial success began to decline. Her highest-charting studio releases peaked within top forty positions on the Country Albums chart: Only Lonely Sometimes (1980), Soft Touch (1982) and Sometimes When We Touch (1985). Her 1987 studio album Higher Ground was critically acclaimed and featured collaborations with various music artists. In 1993, Wynette collaborated with Loretta Lynn and Dolly Parton on the studio release Honky Tonk Angels. The album was certified gold in sales by the Recording Industry Association of America for exceeding 500,000 units. Her final studio album was 1994's Without Walls, which featured collaborations with Sting and Elton John.

== Studio albums ==
=== 1960s ===
List of studio albums, with selected chart positions, certifications and other relevant details
Title	Album details	Peak chart positions			Certifications
Title	Album details	US	US Cou.	UK	Certifications
Your Good Girl's Gonna Go Bad	Released: May 1, 1967; Label: Epic; Formats: LP	—	7	—	
My Elusive Dreams (with David Houston)	Released: August 7, 1967; Label: Epic; Formats: LP	—	11	—	
Take Me to Your World / I Don't Wanna Play House	Released: January 15, 1968; Label: Epic; Formats: LP	—	3	—	
D-I-V-O-R-C-E	Released: July 1, 1968; Label: Epic; Formats: LP	147	1	—	
Stand by Your Man	Released: January 13, 1969; Label: Epic; Formats: LP, cassette	43	2	13	BPI: Silver
Inspiration	Released: March 31, 1969; Label: Epic; Formats: LP	189	19	—	
"—" denotes a recording that did not chart or was not released in that territory.

=== 1970s ===
List of studio albums, with selected chart positions, certifications and other relevant details
Title	Album details	Peak chart positions			
Title	Album details	US	US Cou.	CAN	CAN Cou.
The Ways to Love a Man	Released: January 26, 1970; Label: Epic; Formats: LP, cassette	83	3	—	—
Tammy's Touch	Released: April 27, 1970; Label: Epic; Formats: LP, cassette	85	1	—	—
The First Lady	Released: October 5, 1970; Label: Epic; Formats: LP	119	2	—	—
Christmas with Tammy	Released: November 9, 1970; Label: Epic; Formats: LP, cassette	—	—	—	—
We Sure Can Love Each Other	Released: May 3, 1971; Label: Epic; Formats: LP, cassette	115	8	11	—
Bedtime Story	Released: March 27, 1972; Label: Epic; Formats: LP, cassette	133	7	—	—
My Man	Released: September 25, 1972; Label: Epic; Formats: LP, cassette	201	2	—	—
Another Lonely Song	Released: March 18, 1974; Label: Epic; Formats: LP	—	8	—	—
Woman to Woman	Released: November 25, 1974; Label: Epic; Formats: LP	—	21	—	—
I Still Believe in Fairy Tales	Released: September 8, 1975; Label: Epic; Formats: LP	—	24	—	—
'Til I Can Make It on My Own	Released: March 8, 1976; Label: Epic; Formats: LP	—	3	—	—
You and Me	Released: October 5, 1976; Label: Epic; Formats: LP	—	4	—	—
Let's Get Together	Released: May 30, 1977; Label: Epic; Formats: LP, cassette	—	19	—	—
One of a Kind	Released: November 14, 1977; Label: Epic; Formats: LP, cassette	—	32	—	—
Womanhood	Released: July 24, 1978; Label: Epic; Formats: LP, cassette	—	14	—	8
Just Tammy	Released: June 11, 1979; Label: Epic; Formats: LP, cassette	—	25	—	—
"—" denotes a recording that did not chart or was not released in that territory.

=== 1980s ===
List of studio albums, with selected chart positions, and other relevant details
Title	Album details	Peak chart positions
Title	Album details	US Country
Only Lonely Sometimes	Released: June 9, 1980; Label: Epic; Formats: LP, cassette	37
You Brought Me Back	Released: June 22, 1981; Label: Epic; Formats: LP, cassette	—
Soft Touch	Released: May 3, 1982; Label: Epic; Formats: LP, cassette	31
Good Love & Heartbreak	Released: November 1, 1982; Label: Epic; Formats: LP, cassette	62
Even the Strong Get Lonely	Released: June 20, 1983; Label: Epic; Formats: LP, cassette	66
Sometimes When We Touch	Released: April 1, 1985; Label: Epic; Formats: LP, cassette	32
Higher Ground	Released: July 6, 1987; Label: Epic; Formats: LP, cassette, CD	43
Next to You	Released: March 7, 1989; Label: Epic; Formats: LP, cassette, CD	42
"—" denotes a recording that did not chart or was not released in that territory.

=== 1990s ===
List of studio albums, with selected chart positions, certifications and other relevant details
Title	Album details	Peak chart positions					Certifications
Title	Album details	US	US Cou.	AUS	CAN	CAN Cou.	Certifications
Heart Over Mind	Released: September 3, 1990; Label: Epic; Formats: Cassette, CD	—	64	135	—	—	
Honky Tonk Angels (with Loretta Lynn and Dolly Parton)	Released: November 2, 1993; Label: Columbia; Formats: Cassette, CD	42	6	177	44	6	MC: Gold; RIAA: Gold
Without Walls	Released: October 18, 1994; Label: Epic; Formats: Cassette, CD	—	—	8	—	—	
"—" denotes a recording that did not chart or was not released in that territory.

== Compilation albums ==
=== 1960s ===
List of compilation albums, with selected chart positions, certifications and other relevant details
Title	Album details	Peak chart positions		Certifications
Title	Album details	US	US Cou.	Certifications
The Best of Tammy Wynette	Released: 1968; Label: CBS; Formats: LP	—	—	
The Heart of Tammy Wynette	Released: 1969; Label: Epic; Formats: LP	—	—	
Tammy's Greatest Hits	Released: August 11, 1969; Label: Epic; Formats: LP	37	2	MC: Platinum; RIAA: Platinum
"—" denotes a recording that did not chart or was not released in that territory.

=== 1970s ===
List of compilation albums, with selected chart positions, certifications and other relevant details
Title	Album details	Peak chart positions				Certifications
Title	Album details	US	US Cou.	AUS	UK	Certifications
The World of Tammy Wynette	Released: May 1970; Label: Epic; Formats: LP, cassette	145	8	—	—	
Tammy's Greatest Hits, Volume II	Released: September 6, 1971; Label: Epic; Formats: LP, cassette	118	5	—	—	RIAA: Gold
Straight from the Heart (with David Houston)	Released: December 1971; Label: Columbia Musical Treasures; Formats: LP	—	—	—	—	
Kids Say the Darndest Things	Released: April 23, 1973; Label: Epic; Formats: LP, cassette	—	3	—	—	
First Songs of the First Lady	Released: November 1973; Label: Epic; Formats: LP	—	17	—	—	
Country & Western Superstar	Released: 1973; Label: Epic; Formats: LP	—	—	—	—	
Tammy Wynette	Released: 1974; Label: Columbia; Formats: LP, cassette	—	—	—	—	
Stand by Your Man	Released: 1975; Label: Epic; Formats: LP, cassette	—	—	—	—	
The Best of Tammy Wynette	Released: 1975; Label: Epic; Formats: LP	—	—	—	4	
Tammy Wynette's Greatest Hits, Volume 3	Released: March 3, 1975; Label: Epic; Formats: LP	—	28	—	—	
No Charge	Released: 1976; Label: CBS/Embassy; Formats: LP, cassette	—	—	—	—	
Tammy Wynette's New Greatest Hits	Released: 1976; Label: CBS/Sony; Formats: LP	—	—	—	—	
Tammy	Released: 1977; Label: K-tel; Formats: Cassette, CD	—	—	43	—	
20 Country Classics	Released: 1977; Label: CBS; Formats: LP	—	—	—	3	BPI: Gold
Her Favorite Hits	Released: 1977; Label: Columbia Special Products; Formats: LP, cassette	—	—	—	—	
20 Country Classics	Released: 1977; Label: CBS/Warwick; Formats: LP, cassette	—	—	—	—	
The Best of Tammy Wynette Vol. 2	Released: 1978; Label: Epic Records; Formats: LP, cassette	—	—	—	—	
D-I-V-O-R-C-E	Released: 1978; Label: CBS/Embassy; Formats: LP, cassette	—	—	—	—	
Country Superstars	Released: 1978; Label: CBS; Formats: LP	—	—	—	—	
Greatest Hits, Volume 4	Released: October 2, 1978; Label: Epic; Formats: LP	—	37	—	—	
Tammy Wynette	Released: 1979; Label: CBS/St. Michael; Formats: LP	—	—	—	—	
The Classic Collection	Released: 1979; Label: Epic; Formats: LP, cassette	—	—	—	—	
"—" denotes a recording that did not chart or was not released in that territory.

=== 1980s ===
List of compilation albums, with selected chart positions, certifications and other relevant details
Title	Album details	Peak chart positions			Certifications
Title	Album details	US Cou.	AUS	UK	Certifications
Country's Greatest	Released: 1981; Label: Epic; Formats: Cassette	—	—	—	
Haar Grootste Successen	Released: 1981; Label: CBS; Formats: LP	—	—	—	
Greatest Hits	Released: 1981; Label: CBS; Formats: LP	—	—	—	
Encore	Released: June 1981; Label: Epic; Formats: LP, cassette	44	—	—	
Country Classics	Released: 1982; Label: Columbia; Formats: LP, cassette	—	—	—	
Biggest Hits	Released: September 1982; Label: Epic; Formats: LP, cassette	64	—	—	
Here with the Hits	Released: 1982; Label: CBS Special Products; Formats: LP, cassette	—	—		
Golden Highlights	Released: 1985; Label: Epic; Formats: LP	—	—	—	
Anniversary: 20 Years of Hits	Released: 1987; Label: Epic; Formats: LP, cassette, CD	—	129	45	BPI: Silver
I Love Country	Released: 1988; Label: Epic; Formats: CD	—	—	—	
"—" denotes a recording that did not chart or was not released in that territory.

=== 1990s ===
List of compilation albums, with selected chart positions, and other relevant details
Title	Album details	Peak chart positions
Title	Album details	AUS
The Very Best of Patsy Cline and Tammy Wynette (with Patsy Cline)	Released: 1990; Label: J&B Records (412); Formats: Cassette, CD	76
Stand by Your Man	Released: 1992; Label: Epic; Formats: Cassette, CD	—
Best Loved Hits	Released: 1991; Label: Epic; Formats: Cassette, CD	—
Winners	Released: 1993; Label: Epic; Formats: Cassette, CD	—
Greatest Hits	Released: 1993; Label: Epic; Formats: CD	—
Singing My Songs	Released: 1994; Label: Epic; Formats: Cassette	—
Super Hits	Released: May 19, 1996; Label: Sony; Formats: Cassette, CD	—
The Best of Tammy Wynette	Released: May 13, 1996; Label: Sony; Formats: Cassette, CD	—
Singing My Songs	Released: 1994; Label: Epic; Formats: Cassette	—
Tammy Wynette: Collector's Edition	Released: October 13, 1998; Label: Sony; Formats: Cassette, CD	—
Super Hits, Volume 2	Released: October 13, 1998; Label: Epic/Sony; Formats: Cassette, CD	—
16 Biggest Hits	Released: February 2, 1999; Label: Epic; Formats: CD	—
The Definitive Collection	Released: 1999; Label: Epic; Formats: CD	—
"—" denotes a recording that did not chart or was not released in that territory.

=== 2000s–2010s ===
List of compilation albums, with selected chart positions, and other relevant details
Title	Album details	Peak chart positions
Title	Album details	UK
Love Songs	Released: January 14, 2003; Label: Epic; Formats: CD	—
The Essential Tammy Wynette	Released: March 30, 2004; Label: Epic, Legacy; Formats: CD	—
Stand by Your Man: The Best of Tammy Wynette	Released: March 31, 2008; Label: Sony; Formats: CD	23
Playlist: The Best of Tammy Wynette	Released: July 8, 2008; Label: Legacy; Formats: CD	—
Collections	Released: September 29, 2008; Label: Sony BMG; Formats: CD	—
The Essential Tammy Wynette	Released: August 8, 2013; Label: Epic/Legacy; Formats: CD	—
"—" denotes a recording that did not chart or was not released in that territory.

== Box sets ==
List of compilations albums, showing all relevant details
Title	Album details
Tears of Fire: The 25th Anniversary Collection	Released: November 3, 1992; Label: Epic; Formats: CD
The Box Set Series	Released: May 27, 2014; Label: Epic/Legacy; Formats: CD

== Other album appearances ==
List of non-single guest appearances, with other performing artists, showing year released and album name
Title	Year	Other artist(s)	Album	Ref.
"If I Could Hear My Mother Pray Again"	1991	Charlie Louvin	And That's the Gospel	
"Bedtime Story"	1992	Branson Brothers	Heartmender	
"A Christmas Festival Medley"	1993	Lorrie Morgan	Merry Christmas from London	
"A Woman's Needs"	1993	Elton John	Duets	
"Away in a Manger"	1993	David Foster	The Christmas Album	
"Golden Ring"	1994	George Jones	Bradley Barn Sessions	
