= Tammy's Greatest Hits, Volume II =

Greatest hits album by Tammy Wynette
- Released: September 6, 1971
- Genres: Country; Nashville Sound
- Label: Epic
- Producer: Billy Sherrill

Tammy Wynette chronology
We Sure Can Love Each Other (1971)	Tammy's Greatest Hits, Volume II (1971)	We Go Together (1971)

Singles from Tammy's Greatest Hits, Volume II
- 1. "Good Lovin' (Makes It Right)" Released: June 1971

Tammy's Greatest Hits, Volume II is a compilation album (specifically characterized as a greatest hits album) by American country artist, Tammy Wynette. It was released on September 6, 1971, via Epic Records and featured 11 tracks. A majority of the album compiled previously released singles from the late sixties and early seventies. Some tracks were new material, including "Good Lovin' (Makes It Right)". Released as the disc's lead single, it topped the country charts in 1971. The album itself reached the top five of the American country LP's chart in 1971 and later certified gold in the United States.

== Background, recording and content ==
Tammy Wynette had become one of the country genre's most popular and successful artists. She had a series of chart-topping singles during the sixties and seventies, while additional singles charted the top ten. Several years prior, the Epic label released Wynette's first greatest hits collection, which proved to be successful. By 1971, Wynette had seven singles reach the top ten of the American country charts, four of which topped the chart. This resulted in the making of her second greatest hits collection. The disc featured songs recorded between 1969 and 1971. The compilation compiled 11 songs in total.

Of the album's 11 tracks, seven were previously released as singles. Six of these songs previously appeared on different albums. Previously released singles included "Run, Woman, Run", "We Sure Can Love Each Other", "The Ways to Love a Man", "He Loves Me All the Way", "I'll See Him Through" and "The Wonders You Perform". Three tracks were new recordings that had not been previously released: "Our Last Night Together", "The Only Time I'm Really Me" and "You Can't Hang On". The track, "Still Around", was not a single but previously appeared on Wynette's album, The Ways to Love a Man (1970).

== Critical reception ==
Professional ratings
Review scores
Source	Rating
Allmusic	4/5 stars

Tammy's Greatest Hits, Volume II received mixed critical reception. After its original release, Billboard magazine gave it a positive response. "Volume One of 'Tammy's Greatest Hits' proved a potent seller, and Volume Two has all the hit ingredients to follow suit," the publication commented. Meanwhile, Robert Christgau of Christgau's Record Guide: Rock Albums of the Seventies gave the album a negative response. Christgau found most of the disc to have "the most appalling divine justice songs in that godforsaken subgenre". He did find the tracks "The Only Time I'm Really Me" and "The Wonders You Perform" to be exceptions to the rest of the album. "Beyond those two it's the best of the usual--her sultry resignation has archetypal power when the ideology isn't too repellent. It's more archetypal on her first best-of, though," he concluded. AllMusic rated the album 4.5 out of five stars.

== Release, chart performance and singles ==
Tammy's Greatest Hits, Volume II was released on September 6, 1971, on Epic Records. It was the second greatest hits album of Wynette's career. It was originally distributed as both a vinyl LP and a cassette. Five songs were on the disc's first side, while six songs were on the second's opposite side. The album reached number five on the American Billboard Top Country Albums chart in 1971. It was her ninth disc to make the top ten on the country albums list. It also reached number 118 on the Billboard 200 chart in 1971. Among the album's new tracks was the song, "Good Lovin' (Makes It Right)". It was issued as the lead single for the compilation in June 1971. The song reached the number one spot on the Billboard Hot Country Songs chart and the Canadian RPM Country Tracks chart in 1971. In 1995, the album received a gold certification from the Recording Industry Association of America for selling over 500,000 copies. It became Wynette's third disc to certify gold from the RIAA in her career.

== Track listing ==
Side one
No.	Title	Writer(s)	Length
1.	"Good Lovin' (Makes It Right)"	Billy Sherrill	2:29
2.	"Run, Woman, Run"	Ann Booth; Duke Goff; Anne Hoffman	2:25
3.	"We Sure Can Love Each Other"	Shereill; Tammy Wynette	2:43
4.	"You Can't Hang On (Lookin' On)"	Carmol Taylor; Norro Wilson	2:07
5.	"The Ways to Love a Man"	Sherrill; Glenn Sutton; Wynette	2:27

Side two
No.	Title	Writer(s)	Length
1.	"He Loves Me All the Way"	Sherrill; Taylor; Wilson	2:35
2.	"I'll See Him Through"	Sherrill; Wilson	2:51
3.	"Still Around"	Sherrill	2:47
4.	"The Only Time I'm Really Me"	Wynette	2:27
5.	"Our Last Night Together"	Ron Gist	2:46
6.	"The Wonders You Perform"	Jerry Chesnut	3:28

== Charts ==
Chart (1971)	Peak position
US Billboard 200	118
US Top Country Albums (Billboard)	5

== Certifications ==
Certifications for Greatest Hits, Volume II
Region	Certification	Certified units/sales
United States (RIAA)	Gold	500,000^{^}
^{^} Shipments figures based on certification alone.

== Release history ==
Release history and formats for Tammy's Greatest Hits, Volume II
Region	Date	Format	Label	Ref.
Australia	September 6, 1971	Vinyl	Epic Records	
Europe	September 6, 1971	Vinyl	Epic Records	
North America	September 6, 1971	Vinyl; cassette	Epic Records	
