= We Sure Can Love Each Other =

We Sure Can Love Each Other may refer to:

- "We Sure Can Love Each Other" (song), a 1971 song by Tammy Wynette
- We Sure Can Love Each Other (album), a 1971 album by Tammy Wynette
