= You and Me (Tammy Wynette album) =

- North American cover art

Studio album by Tammy Wynette
- Released: September 27, 1976
- Recorded: June 1976
- Studio: Columbia (Nashville, Tennessee)
- Genre: Country
- Length: 30:02
- Label: Epic
- Producer: Billy Sherrill

Tammy Wynette chronology
Golden Ring (1976)	You and Me (1976)	Let's Get Together (1977)

Alternate cover
- International cover art

Singles from You and Me
- 1. "You and Me" Released: August 1976

Professional ratings
Review scores
Source	Rating
AllMusic	3/5 stars

You and Me is the sixteenth studio album by American country music singer-songwriter Tammy Wynette. It was released on September 27, 1976, by Epic Records.

== Chart performance ==
The album peaked at No. 4 on the Billboard Country Albums chart. The album's only single, "You and Me", peaked at No. 1 on the Billboard Country Singles chart.

== Track listing ==
Side one
No.	Title	Writer(s)	Length
1.	"You and Me"	Billy Sherrill, George Richey	3:20
2.	"Every Now and Then"	Mac Davis	3:07
3.	"Funny Face"	Donna Fargo	2:43
4.	"The Hawaiian Wedding Song (Ke Kali Nei Au)"	Al Hoffman, Dick Manning, Charles E. King	2:20
5.	"Little Things"	Willie Nelson, Shirley Nelson	4:10

Side two
No.	Title	Writer(s)	Length
1.	"Jesus Send a Song"	Earl Montgomery, A. McLendon, A. Stancil	2:13
2.	"One of These Days"	Montgomery	2:55
3.	"You Hurt the Love Right Out of Me"	Johnny Paycheck	2:05
4.	"When Love Was All We Had"	Richey, Montgomery	2:48
5.	"Dixieland (You Will Never Die)"	Johnny Cunningham	4:21

== Personnel ==
Adapted from the album liner notes.

- Lou Bradley - engineer
- The Jordanaires - backing vocals
- Bill McElhiney - string arrangements
- Billy Sherrill - producer
- Tammy Wynette - lead vocals

== Charts ==
=== Album ===
Year	Chart	Peak position
1976	Country Albums (Billboard)	4

=== Singles ===
Year	Single	Chart	Peak position
1976	"You and Me"	Country Singles (Billboard)	1
