= The Wonders You Perform =

Single by Tammy Wynette
- B-side: "Gentle Shepherd"
- Released: November 1970
- Recorded: February 26, 1970
- Studio: Columbia Recording Studio; Nashville, Tennessee, U.S.
- Genre: Country; gospel
- Length: 3:25
- Label: Epic
- Songwriter: Jerry Chesnut
- Producer: Billy Sherrill

Tammy Wynette singles chronology
"Run Woman Run" (1970)	"The Wonders You Perform" (1970)	"One Happy Christmas" (1970)

"The Wonders You Perform" is a song written by Jerry Chesnut, and recorded by American country music artist Tammy Wynette. It was released as a single in November 1970.

== Background and reception ==
"The Wonders You Perform" was first recorded on February 26, 1970, at the Columbia Recording Studio in Nashville, Tennessee. Three additional tracks were recorded during a session produced by Billy Sherrill. Sherrill was Wynette's long-time producer.

The song was written by Jerry Chesnut, who was Wynette's brother-in-law at the time. Chesnut originally wrote it as a gospel song about the "miracles of Jesus" and how he helps heal through challenging times.

The song reached number 5 on the Billboard Hot Country Singles chart in early 1971. It did not chart within the Billboard Hot 100, but instead reached a charting position on the Billboard Bubbling Under Hot 100 list. In September 1971 the song was included on Wynette's second compilation album with Epic Records entitled Tammy's Greatest Hits, Volume Two.

"The Wonders You Perform" was also notably recorded by Jean Shepard for her 1971 album Here and Now and by Connie Smith for her 1974 album That's the Way Love Goes.

== Track listings ==
7" vinyl single

- "The Wonders You Perform" – 3:25
- "Gentle Shepherd" – 2:40

== Charts ==
=== Weekly charts ===
Chart (1970–71)	Peak position
US Bubbling Under Hot 100 (Billboard)	4
US Hot Country Singles (Billboard)	5
CAN Country Singles (RPM)	2
