= Good Lovin' (Makes It Right) =

Single by Tammy Wynette

from the album Tammy's Greatest Hits, Volume II
- B-side: "I Love You Mr. Jones"
- Released: June 1971
- Genre: Country
- Label: Epic
- Songwriter(s): Billy Sherrill
- Producer(s): Billy Sherrill

Tammy Wynette singles chronology
"We Sure Can Love Each Other" (1971)	"Good Lovin' (Makes It Right)" (1971)	"Bedtime Story" (1971)

"Good Lovin' (Makes It Right)" is a song written by Billy Sherrill and recorded by American country music artist Tammy Wynette. It was released in June 1971 as a single from her compilation album Tammy's Greatest Hits, Volume Two. The song was Wynette's ninth number one on the country chart. The single stayed at number one for two weeks and a total of spent fifteen weeks on the country chart.

== Chart performance ==
Chart (1971)	Peak position
US Hot Country Songs (Billboard)	1
U.S. Billboard Bubbling Under the Hot 100	111
Canadian RPM Country Tracks	1
