= You and Me (Tammy Wynette song) =

- Dutch release picture sleeve

Single by Tammy Wynette

from the album You and Me
- B-side: "When Love Was All We Had"
- Released: July 1976
- Recorded: June 1976
- Genre: Country
- Length: 3:20
- Label: Epic 8-50264
- Songwriter(s): Billy Sherrill and George Richey
- Producer(s): Billy Sherrill

Tammy Wynette singles chronology
""'Til I Can Make It On My Own" " (1976)	"You and Me" (1976)	""Near You" (with George Jones) " (1977)

"You and Me" is a song written by Billy Sherrill and George Richey, and recorded by American country music artist Tammy Wynette. It was released in July 1976 as the first single and title track from the album You and Me. The song was Wynette's sixteenth and final number one country hit as a solo artist. The single stayed at number one for two weeks and spent a total of twelve weeks on the country chart.

== Composition ==
According to Richey in a 1987 interview, the lyrics were inspired by his own (at the time) secret admiration for Wynette, who was still recovering from the fallout of her recent divorce from George Jones. The pair became close friends and eventually married two years later.

== Charts ==
=== Weekly charts ===
Chart (1976)	Peak position
US Hot Country Songs (Billboard)	1
U.S. Billboard Bubbling Under the Hot 100	101
U.S. Billboard Easy Listening	28
Canadian RPM Country Tracks	6
Canadian RPM Adult Contemporary Tracks	19

=== Year-end charts ===
Chart (1976)	Position
US Hot Country Songs (Billboard)	24
