= We Sure Can Love Each Other (song) =

Single by Tammy Wynette

from the album We Sure Can Love Each Other
- B-side: "Fun"
- Released: February 1971
- Genre: Country
- Label: Epic
- Songwriter(s): Billy Sherrill; Tammy Wynette
- Producer(s): Billy Sherrill

Tammy Wynette singles chronology
"The Wonders You Perform" (1970)	"We Sure Can Love Each Other" (1971)	"Good Lovin' (Makes It Right)" (1971)

"We Sure Can Love Each Other" is a song recorded American country music artist Tammy Wynette. It was released in February 1971 as the only single from her album of the same name. The song peaked at number 2 on the Billboard Hot Country Singles chart. It also reached number 1 on the RPM Country Tracks chart in Canada. The song was written by Wynette, along with Billy Sherrill.

== Chart performance ==
Chart (1971)	Peak position
U.S. Billboard Hot Country Singles	2
U.S. Billboard Bubbling Under the Hot 100	103
Canadian RPM Country Tracks	1
