= Even the Strong Get Lonely =

Studio album by Tammy Wynette
- Released: June 20, 1983
- Recorded: Mar. 1983
- Studio: Woodland (Nashville, Tennessee); Sound Shop (Nashville, Tennessee)
- Genre: Country
- Length: 31:41
- Label: Epic
- Producer: George Richey

Tammy Wynette chronology
Good Love & Heartbreak (1982)	Even the Strong Get Lonely (1983)	Sometimes When We Touch (1985)

Singles from Even the Strong Get Lonely
- 1. "Unwed Fathers" Released: Jun. 1983; 2. "Still in the Ring" Released: Sep. 1983

Professional ratings
Review scores
Source	Rating
Allmusic	2.5/5 stars

Even the Strong Get Lonely is the twenty-fifth studio album by American country music singer-songwriter Tammy Wynette. It was released on June 20, 1983, by Epic Records.

== Commercial performance ==
The album peaked at No. 66 on the Billboard Country Albums chart. The album's first single, "Unwed Fathers", and second single, "Still in the Ring", both peaked at No. 63 on the Billboard Country Singles chart.

== Track listing ==
Side one
No.	Title	Writer(s)	Length
1.	"Unwed Fathers"	Bobby Braddock, John Prine	3:10
2.	"I'm So Afraid That I'd Live Through It"	Tammy Wynette, Cathye Walker	2:45
3.	"A Slightly Used Woman"	Tammy Wynette, Melvin Powers, Tommy Boyce	2:33
4.	"Only the Strong Survive"	Larry Butler	3:22
5.	"With a Friend Like You (Who Needs a Lover)"	Jimbeau Hinson, Paulette Carlson	3:05

Side two
No.	Title	Writer(s)	Length
1.	"Still in the Ring"	Michael Garvin, Bucky Jones	3:24
2.	"Midnight Love"	Buck Moore	3:21
3.	"Love Overdue"	John Virgin, Jamey Ryan	3:41
4.	"Darlin' Take Care of Yourself"	Mickey Newbury	3:01
5.	"Even the Strong Get Lonely Sometimes"	Jeff Tweel, Paul Richey	3:19

== Personnel ==
Adapted from the album liner notes.

- David Briggs - keyboards
- Mike Douchette - acoustic guitar, harmonica
- Mike Leech - bass
- Farrell Morris - percussion
- Weldon Myrick - steel guitar
- The Nashville String Machine - strings
- George Richey - producer
- Jerry Stembridge - acoustic guitar
- James Stroud - drums
- Pete Wade - lead guitar
- D. Bergen White - spring arrangements
- Hank Williams - mastering
- Tommy Williams - fiddle
- Tammy Wynette - lead vocals

== Chart positions ==
=== Album ===
Year	Chart	Peak position
1983	Country Albums (Billboard)	66

=== Singles ===
Year	Single	Chart	Peak position
1983	"Unwed Fathers"	Country Singles (Billboard)	63
1983	"Still in the Ring"	Country Singles (Billboard)	63
