= One of a Kind (Tammy Wynette album) =

Studio album by Tammy Wynette
- Released: November 7, 1977
- Recorded: December 1976–July 1977
- Studio: Columbia (Nashville, Tennessee)
- Genre: Country
- Length: 28:53
- Label: Epic
- Producer: Billy Sherrill

Tammy Wynette chronology
Let's Get Together (1977)	One of a Kind (1977)	Womanhood (1978)

Singles from One of a Kind
- 1. "One of a Kind" Released: September 26, 1977

Professional ratings
Review scores
Source	Rating
AllMusic	4.5/5 stars
The Rolling Stone Album Guide	3/5 stars

One of a Kind is a studio album by American country music singer-songwriter Tammy Wynette. It was released on November 14, 1977, by Epic Records.

== Commercial performance ==
The album peaked at No. 32 on the Billboard Country Albums chart. The album's only single, "One of a Kind", peaked at No. 6 on the Billboard Country Singles chart.

== Track listing ==
Side one
No.	Title	Writer(s)	Length
1.	"One of a Kind"	Billy Sherrill, Stephen Allen Davis	2:54
2.	"That's the Way It Could Have Been"	Tammy Wynette	2:52
3.	"Love Survived"	Jerry Foster, Bill Rice	2:46
4.	"That's Just the Way I Am"	George Richey, Roger Bowling	2:42
5.	"Sweet Music Man"	Kenny Rogers	3:26

Side two
No.	Title	Writer(s)	Length
1.	"What I Had with You"	Curly Putman, Sonny Throckmorton	2:32
2.	"I'm Not That Good at Goodbye"	Bob McDill, Don Williams	3:17
3.	"Heaven's Just a Sin Away"	Jerry Gillespie	2:25
4.	"I'll Be Your Bridge (Just Lay Me Down)"	Royce Porter, Paul Huffman	2:59
5.	"Dear Daughters"	Wynette	3:00

== Personnel ==
Adapted from the album liner notes.

- Bill Barnes - album design
- Lou Bradley - engineer
- Ken Laxton - engineer
- Bill McElhiney - string arrangement
- Judy Mock - photography
- The Nashville Edition - backing vocals
- Billy Sherrill - producer
- Bergen White - string arrangement
- Tammy Wynette - lead vocals

== Chart positions ==
=== Album ===
Year	Chart	Peak position
1977	Country Albums (Billboard)	32

=== Singles ===
Year	Single	Chart	Peak position
1977	"One of a Kind"	Country Singles (Billboard)	6
