= Christmas with Tammy =

Studio album by Tammy Wynette
- Released: November 9, 1970
- Recorded: September 1970
- Studio: Columbia Studio B (Nashville, Tennessee)
- Genre: Christmas; Country
- Label: Epic
- Producer: Billy Sherrill

Tammy Wynette chronology
The First Lady (1970)	Christmas with Tammy (1970)	We Sure Can Love Each Other (1971)

Singles from Christmas with Tammy
- 1. "One Happy Christmas" Released: November 1970

Christmas with Tammy is a studio album by American country artist, Tammy Wynette. It was released on November 9, 1970, via Epic Records and featured 12 tracks of Christmas music. The project was also Wynette's tenth studio album in her career and made an appearance on the Billboard Best Bets for Christmas chart. Christmas with Tammy was re-released several times in various formats. One single was spawned from the album. The project received a positive reception from critics following its release.

== Background, recording and content ==
Tammy Wynette had reached her peak commercial success by 1970. She had a string of chart-topping country singles during the late sixties and through 1970 with songs like "I Don't Wanna Play House", "Take Me to Your World", "D-I-V-O-R-C-E", "Singing My Song" and her signature "Stand by Your Man". She also won a series of accolades including a Grammy award and recorded a series of studio albums during this period. Outside of Wynette's mainstream country albums, she also recorded an inspirational album in 1969 and a Christmas album in 1970. Christmas with Tammy was recorded in September 1970 at Columbia Studio B (the "Quonset hut studio") located in Nashville, Tennessee. The project was produced by Billy Sherrill.

Christmas with Tammy consisted of 12 tracks. The liner notes described it as being "a return to the original meaning of Christmas", which referenced its Christian influence. Among its material were several country versions of traditional Christmas music. The traditional songs were included on the first half of the disc: "O Little Town of Bethlehem", "It Came Upon a Midnight Clear", "Silent Night, Holy Night", "Joy to the World" and "Away in a Manger". The second half of the album featured two covers of more recent Christmas selections: "Blue Christmas" and "White Christmas". She also covered George Jones's "Lonely Christmas Call". New holiday material was also included on the project: "One Happy Christmas" and "(Merry Christmas) We Must Be Having One".

== Critical reception ==
Professional ratings
Review scores
Source	Rating
Allmusic	3/5 stars

Christmas with Tammy was given a positive reception from critics and writers. In its original release, it was reviewed by Billboard magazine who praised that traditional material was mixed in with "solid fresher tunes". Billboard critics also remarked that its new material would serve well as singles for the Christmas season. It was later reviewed by William Ruhlmann of AllMusic, who rated the project three out of five stars. Ruhlmann concluded that, "She and producer Billy Sherrill were playing it safe, which is not a bad thing in a Christmas album." Author of Wynette's 2010 biography, Jimmy McDonough, commented on Christmas with Tammy as well. McDonough positively commented that the project was a departure from the "usual collection of random hits plus random songs of varying quality." McDonough further commented that Wynette's vocals "delivered" on the album.

== Release, chart performance and singles ==
Christmas with Tammy was originally released on November 9, 1970, on Epic Records. It was Wynette's tenth studio album and first studio collection of Christmas material. The album was issued as both a vinyl LP and a cassette. Five songs were included on both sides of the discs. The album did not make the American Billboard country albums chart, but instead peaked at number 30 on the Billboard Best Bets for Christmas chart. In its original release, one single was spawned from the album: "One Happy Christmas". The single was also released in November 1970. Christmas with Tammy was re-released several times over the years. In Europe it was re-released twice in the seventies. In 1987, it was re-released in the United Kingdom as both an LP and as a cassette. In North America, it was re-released as a compact disc and a cassette in 1991. In 1998, it was re-released following Wynette's death earlier that year. Only ten track were included on the 1998 version. The 1998 version was then issued digitally with ten tracks again. It was reissued in the 2010s by Sony Music Entertainment, however a specific date is not known.

== Track listings ==
=== Original version ===
Side one
No.	Title	Writer(s)	Length
1.	"Silent Night, Holy Night"	Arranged by Billy Sherrill; Traditional	3:19
2.	"O Little Town of Bethlehem"	Arranged by Billy Sherrill; Traditional	2:12
3.	"It Came Upon the Midnight Clear"	Arranged by Billy Sherrill; Traditional	3:12
4.	"Joy to the World"	Arranged by Billy Sherrill; Traditional	2:13
5.	"Away in a Manger"	Arranged by Billy Sherrill; Traditional	2:23
6.	"Gentle Shepherd"	B. Reichner	2:40

Side two
No.	Title	Writer(s)	Length
1.	"Blue Christmas"	Bill Hayes; Jay W. Johnson	2:27
2.	"(Merry Christmas) We Must Be Having One"	Danny Walls; Norro Wilson	2:28
3.	"White Christmas"	Irving Berlin	2:38
4.	"One Happy Christmas"	Carmol Taylor	2:06
5.	"Lonely Christmas Call"	George Jones	2:51
6.	"Let's Put Christ Back in Christmas"	Taylor; Agnes Wilson	2:29

=== Christmas with Tammy Wynette ===
Compact disc and digital versions
No.	Title	Writer(s)	Length
1.	"Silent Night"	Arranged by Billy Sherrill; Traditional	3:25
2.	"O Little Town of Bethlehem"	Arranged by Billy Sherrill; Traditional	2:16
3.	"It Came Upon a Midnight Clear"	Arranged by Billy Sherrill; Traditional	3:14
4.	"Joy to the World"	Arranged by Billy Sherrill; Traditional	2:18
5.	"Away in a Manger"	Arranged by Billy Sherrill; Traditional	2:25
6.	"Blue Christmas"	Hayes; Johnson	2:34
7.	"Merry Christmas"	Walls; Wilson	2:34
8.	"White Christmas"	Berlin	2:44
9.	"One Happy Christmas"	Taylor	2:09
10.	"Let's Put Christ Back in Christmas"	Taylor; Wilson	2:32

== Personnel ==
All credits are adapted from the original liner notes of Christmas with Tammy.

- The Jordanaires – backing vocals
- The Nashville Edition – backing vocals
- Billy Sherrill – producer
- Tammy Wynette – lead vocals

== Charts ==
Chart (1970)	Peak position
US Best Bets for Christmas (Billboard)	30

== Release history ==
Region	Date	Format	Label	Ref.
North America	November 9, 1970	Vinyl; cassette	Epic Records	
Europe	1975	Vinyl	Epic Records	
Europe	1976	Vinyl	Epic Records	
Europe	1987	Vinyl; cassette	Epic Records	
North America	1991	Compact disc; cassette	Sony Special Products	
North America	1998	Compact disc	Epic Records	
North America	2010s	Music download; streaming	Sony Music Entertainment	
