= Sometimes When We Touch (album) =

Studio album by Tammy Wynette
- Released: April 1, 1985
- Recorded: Nov.–Dec. 1984
- Studio: The Bennett House (Franklin, Tennessee)
- Genre: Country
- Length: 31:53
- Label: Epic
- Producer: Steve Buckingham

Tammy Wynette chronology
Even the Strong Get Lonely (1983)	Sometimes When We Touch (1985)	Higher Ground (1987)

Singles from Sometimes When We Touch
- 1. "Sometimes When We Touch" Released: February 1985; 2. "You Can Lead a Heart to Love (But You Can't Make It Fall)" Released: June 1985

Sometimes When We Touch is the twenty-sixth studio album by American country music singer-songwriter Tammy Wynette. It was released on April 1, 1985, by Epic Records.

== Commercial performance ==
The album peaked at No. 32 on the Billboard Country Albums chart. The album's first single, "Sometimes When We Touch", peaked at No. 6 on the Billboard Country Singles chart, and the second single, "You Can Lead a Heart to Love (But You Can't Make It Fall)", peaked at No. 48.

== Track listing ==
Side one
No.	Title	Length
1.	"Sometimes When We Touch" (duet with Mark Gray)	3:37
2.	"You Can Lead a Heart to Love (But You Can't Make It Fall)"	3:02
3.	"Breaking Away"	3:03
4.	"Every Time You Touch Her (Think of Me)"	3:24
5.	"Between Twenty-Nine and Danger"	3:07

Side two
No.	Title	Length
1.	"It's Only Over for You"	3:17
2.	"The Party of the First Part"	3:03
3.	"It's Hard To Be The Dreamer (When I Used To Be The Dream)"	3:19
4.	"If It Ain't Love"	2:55
5.	"He Talks to Me"	3:06

== Chart positions ==
=== Album ===
Year	Chart	Peak position
1985	Country Albums (Billboard)	32

=== Singles ===
Year	Single	Chart	Peak position
1985	"Sometimes When We Touch"	Country Singles (Billboard)	6
1985	"You Can Lead a Heart to Love (But You Can't Make It Fall)"	Country Singles (Billboard)	48
