= Tammy Wynette =

American country singer (1942–1998)

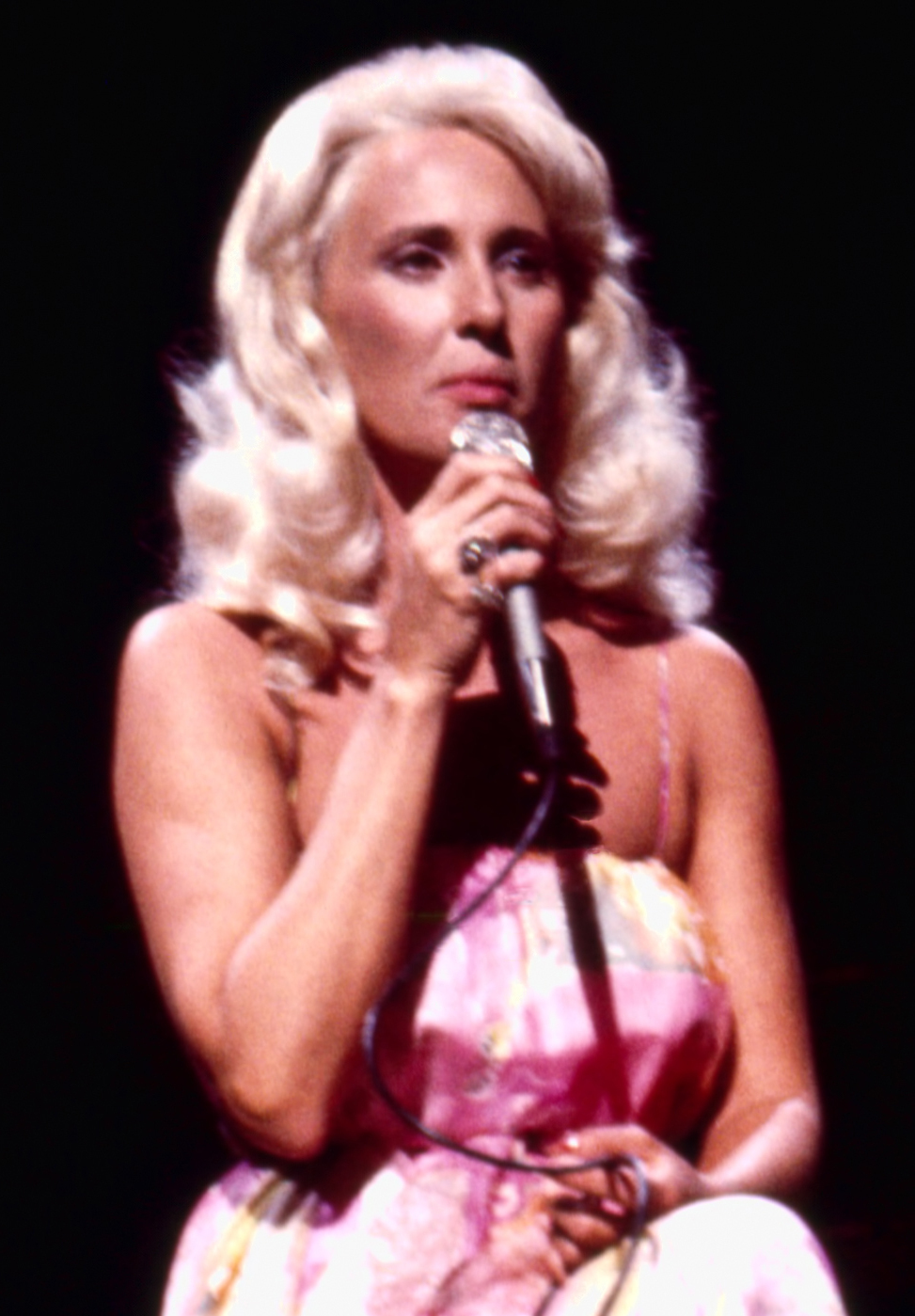
- On the set of The Johnny Cash Show in 1971
- Born: Virginia Wynette Pugh; May 5, 1942; Tremont, Mississippi, U.S.
- Died: April 6, 1998 (aged 55); Nashville, Tennessee, U.S.
- Resting place: Woodlawn Memorial Park
- Occupations: Singer; songwriter; author; actress
- Years active: 1965–1998
- Spouses: Euple Byrd (m. 1960; div. 1965); Don Chapel (m. 1967; ann. 1968); George Jones (m. 1969; div. 1975); Michael Tomlin (m. 1976; ann. 1976); George Richey (m. 1978)
- Children: 4
- Musical career
- Genres: Country; Nashville sound
- Instruments: Vocals; guitar; piano
- Works: Albums; singles
- Labels: Epic; Columbia; MCA Nashville
- Website: tammywynette.com

Tammy Wynette (born Virginia Wynette Pugh; May 5, 1942 – April 6, 1998) was an American country music singer and songwriter, considered among the genre's most influential and successful artists. Wynette was one of the few singers who brought a woman's perspective to the male-dominated country music field. Her characteristic vocal delivery has been acclaimed by critics, journalists and writers for conveying unique emotion. Twenty of her singles topped the US country chart during her career. Her signature song "Stand by Your Man" received both acclaim and criticism for its portrayal of women's loyalty to their husbands.

Wynette was born and raised near Tremont, a small town in Itawamba County, Mississippi, by her mother, stepfather, and maternal grandparents. During childhood, Wynette picked cotton on her family's farm but also had aspirations of becoming a singer. She performed music through her teen years and married Euple Byrd at age 17. Wynette enrolled in cosmetology school and later appeared on a local country music television program. Wynette then divorced and moved to Nashville, Tennessee, to pursue a country music career in 1965. She soon met her second husband, Don Chapel, and eventually signed with Epic Records. Under the production of Billy Sherrill, her first single, "Apartment No. 9", was released in 1966. In 1967, she had her first commercial success with the single "Your Good Girl's Gonna Go Bad". In the late 1960s, Wynette's career rose further with the number one country singles "I Don't Wanna Play House", "D-I-V-O-R-C-E" and the self-penned "Stand by Your Man".

As her career entered the 1970s, Wynette was among country music's most popular artists and regularly topped the charts. During the late 1960s, she had met and in 1969 married her third husband, fellow country artist George Jones. The pair had a recording career together that resulted in several number one country singles and a successful touring act. However, their relationship was tumultuous and they divorced in 1975. Following their separation Wynette returned as a headlining solo performer. She also continued to have singles regularly make the upper reaches of the country charts into the 1980s. During this time, she also acted on several television shows, including Capitol (1986). Wynette had several more high-profile relationships before marrying her final husband, George Richey, in 1978. Several intestinal health problems led to hospitalizations and addictions to prescription pain killers, the latter of which was said to have led to her death in 1998.

Wynette has sold an estimated 30 million records worldwide. She has received two Grammy Awards, three Country Music Association awards, and two Academy of Country Music Awards. Wynette was also among country music's first female performers to have discs certify gold and platinum by the Recording Industry Association of America. Her influence as a country music artist led to several inductions into music associations. This includes inductions into the Country Music Hall of Fame and the Nashville Songwriters Hall of Fame.

== Early years ==
Virginia Wynette Pugh was born in Itawamba County, Mississippi, in 1942. The farm where she was born was near the Alabama state line, between Red Bay, Alabama, and Tremont, Mississippi. She later credited both Alabama and Mississippi as her home states. She was the only child born to Mildred Faye Russell and William Hollis Pugh. Mildred Russell was a school teacher, while William Pugh was an aspiring musician who played guitar and sang in a group. Her father was diagnosed with an inoperable brain tumor and died when Wynette was only nine months old. Weeks before his death, Wynette's father took her to the family piano and insisted she learn to play when she became old enough. Following his death, Wynette's mother moved to Memphis, Tennessee, where she worked in a defense plant during World War II. She was left in the care of her grandparents and picked cotton on their Mississippi farm. "I hated every minute I spent picking cotton", she recalled. Her mother's sister, Carolyn Russell, was raised alongside Wynette and they developed a sister-like bond. She also learned to play the musical instruments that her father left behind.

Wynette referred to her grandparents as "Mama" and "Daddy" while Mildred Russell was simply referred to as "Mother". Most people referred to young Virginia Pugh by her middle name, "Wynette". In 1946, Mildred Russell married Wynette's stepfather, Foy Lee. As a child, Wynette played basketball but was not allowed to wear the shorts provided to the girls' team. Instead, her grandfather had Wynette wear blue jeans. She later made the all-state basketball team in both 1958 and 1959. She also took piano lessons and learned to play by ear. After several lessons, the instructor told her mother she was "wasting her money" because of her natural ability on the instrument. In upper elementary school, Wynette befriended classmate Linda Cayson. The pair became close friends and later realized they could harmonize with one another. Along with another friend, they would form a trio called Wynette, Linda & Imogene. The trio often sang at gospel functions together. A local Methodist minister had both Linda and Wynette sing on his early-morning Saturday radio show on WERH. They listened to music together, including country artists Ernest Tubb and Hank Williams.

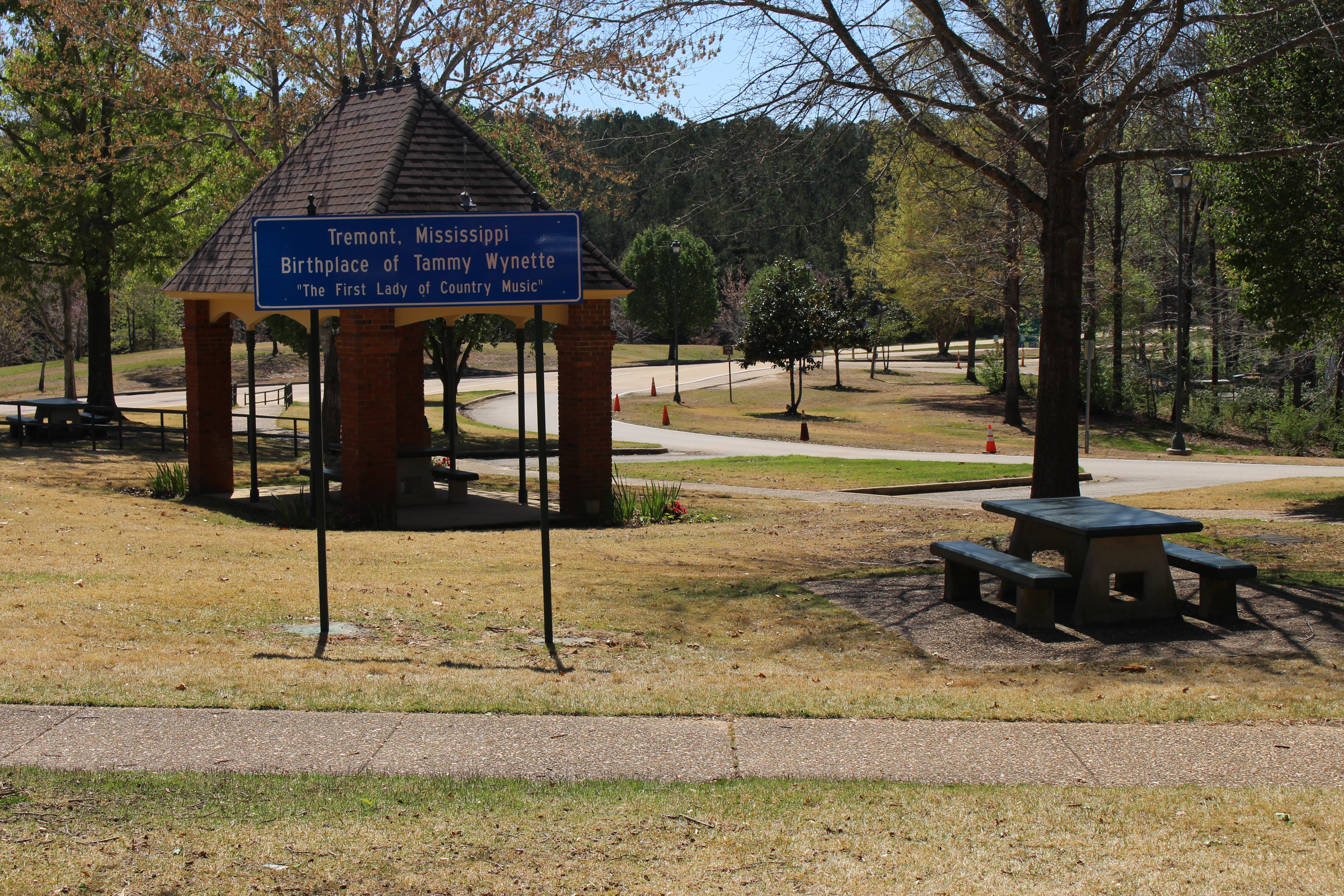
Wynette was born and raised mostly in Itawamba County, Mississippi, attending high school in Tremont, as noted in the picture.

Wynette attended Tremont High School in Tremont, Mississippi. She was considered to be "popular" by high school friends. In 1960, she was voted "Miss Tremont High School" by her classmates. She smoked cigarettes and became fascinated with the opposite sex. "She was into datin' and boys long before we were", recalled friend Holly Ford. However, her mother Mildred disapproved of her daughter dating and the pair often argued about it during her teenage years. During this period, Wynette fell in love with Billy Cole, who attended the same church. She insisted on marrying Cole and attempted to keep it from her mother by mail-ordering eight dollar rings to her high school. However, Wynette's mother discovered her daughter's idea and stopped the courtship. She temporarily moved to Birmingham, Alabama, when she was 17, where her mother and Foy Lee were living at the time. She soon moved back to her grandparents' farm after her mother found her difficult to control.

At age 17, she married Euple Byrd, which caused friction with Wynette's mother. The couple lived temporarily at Euple's family home and then in a small apartment in Tupelo, Mississippi. By this point, Wynette had become pregnant with her first child and was given the opportunity to live rent-free at a home owned by her grandfather. Built in 1844, the home had no running water, heat, or electricity. Friend Linda Cayson helped Wynette nail cardboard boxes to the walls to keep the wind out during the winter months.

In 1963, Euple obtained a job in Red Bay, Alabama, that allowed the family to move to a home with more amenities. To help sustain themselves financially, Wynette convinced her mother to help pay for her to attend Mrs. McGuire's School of Beauty. In the middle of her schooling, Euple found work in Memphis, Tennessee, and the young family moved there. In Memphis, she obtained a job as a barmaid and sang for customers. Both the bar owner and the building's in-house pianist were impressed by Wynette's talents and encouraged a move to Nashville, Tennessee. However, the family soon returned to Tupelo where she finished cosmetology school. After becoming famous, she continued renewing her cosmetology license every year for the rest of her life, in case she ever had to go back to a daily job. Wynette ultimately left her first marriage and moved to Birmingham, Alabama.

== Career ==
=== 1964–1966: Early career in Alabama and the move to Nashville ===
Wynette moved to Birmingham in 1964 and lived with her paternal grandparents, uncle, and cousins. She discovered that her cosmetology license would not transfer to Alabama, so she enrolled at a beauty college. Her paternal family also encouraged Wynette's musical talents. Her uncle worked for the WBRC television station in Birmingham and helped his niece secure an audition for the Country Boy Eddie country music television show. The show's headliner, Eddie Burns, was impressed and agreed to have her on the program. On her first show, she sang a cover of Patsy Cline's "Sweet Dreams" while the camera pointed above her waist to avoid showing Wynette's pregnant body. Wynette performed on the program from six to eight o'clock each morning before going to school, then went to work at the Midfield Beauty Salon. She received 45 dollars per week. She befriended the show's pianist, David Vest, who helped record demos. The pair often performed together, playing piano bars in the Birmingham area.

Wynette started visiting a local radio station called WYAM and met disc jockey Fred Lehner. She accompanied Lehner on a trip to Nashville, Tennessee, which inspired her to pursue a country music career. Meanwhile, Euple Byrd continued returning to Birmingham. Not officially divorced, the couple agreed to give their marriage one final chance and they lived in a Birmingham housing project near the steel industry. Byrd secured a new job but did not return to their residence, according to Wynette. She decided to make the move to Nashville in January 1966 with her three children and all their belongings in their car.

After she arrived in Nashville, Wynette moved into the Anchor Motel while she attempted to secure a recording contract. She met her future husband, musician Don Chapel, at the motel. They eventually moved into an East Nashville apartment and put together a road show. For several months the pair performed in several states, including Georgia and Pennsylvania. Chapel attempted to help Wynette secure a country recording contract with the Musicor, Hickory, Kapp, and Decca labels, but Wynette was turned down by every company. Nashville producer Kelso Herston helped her arrange a meeting with new Epic Records producer Billy Sherrill. Wynette went into Sherrill's office and pitched him several songs. Sherrill was impressed by her voice and signed her to a recording contract with Epic in 1966.

On her first recording session, Wynette cut Bobby Austin's "Apartment No. 9". At that point Sherrill changed her stage name from Wynette Byrd to Tammy Wynette. "You look like a Tammy to Me," Sherrill told her in reference to the film Tammy and the Bachelor. "Apartment No. 9" was released as Wynette's debut single and reached number 44 on the US country songs chart. Although she had a charting single, Wynette still had little income. Sherrill arranged for booking agent Hubert Long to set up tour dates for her. Most promoters did not want to book Wynette because she was a female performer. "I had begun to realize I was working in a man's world, and most of them looked down on women in the business", she later explained.

=== 1967–1975: Breakthrough, "Stand by Your Man" and recordings with George Jones ===
In 1967, Epic released "Your Good Girl's Gonna Go Bad". It climbed to number three on the US country singles chart and was Wynette's first chart success. Her debut album of the same name was also released in 1967 and reached number seven on the US Country LPs chart. They were followed by a duet with David Houston called "My Elusive Dreams", which was her first number one country single. Its follow-up was the solo single "I Don't Wanna Play House" which topped the US country chart in 1967. It later won Wynette the Grammy Award for Best Female Country Vocal Performance. Her next singles topped the US country chart through 1968: "Take Me to Your World" and "D-I-V-O-R-C-E". The latter was her second to make the US Hot 100 and also her first to top Canada's country chart. The recordings appeared on Wynette's third studio disc, Take Me to Your World / I Don't Wanna Play House, which reached number three on the Country LPs chart in 1968.

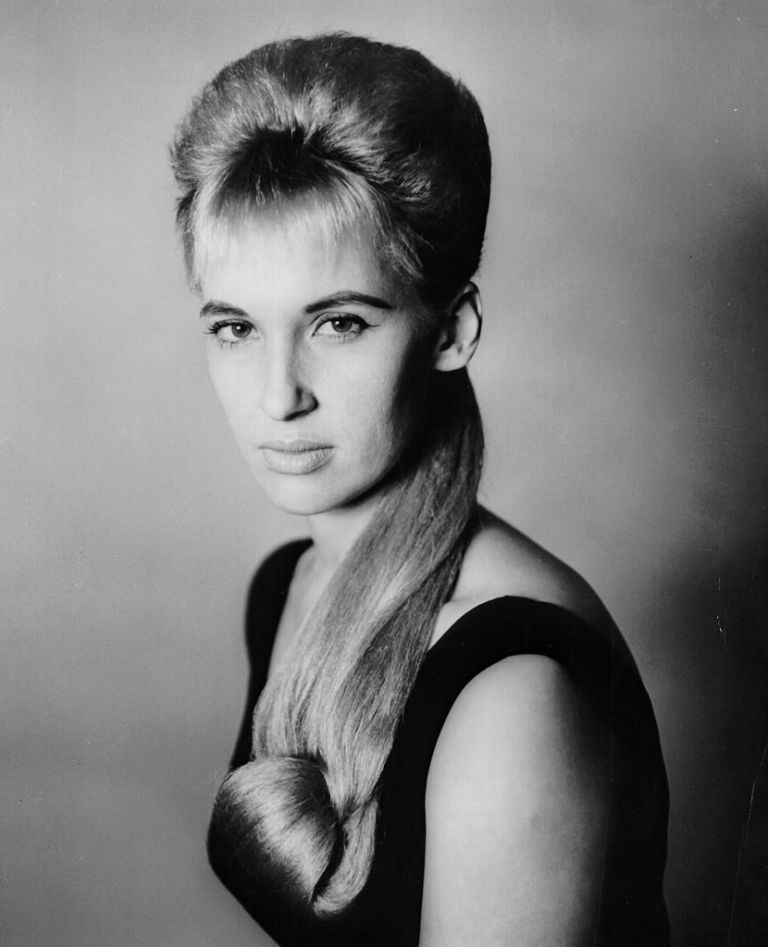
A promotional image of Wynette, 1970

Wynette started touring amidst her newfound success. She was joined by second husband, Don Chapel, and a band called the Countrypolitans. The group featured a drummer, steel guitarist, guitar player, bass player, and background singer. Wynette herself played acoustic guitar on occasion. She toured for the first time internationally in late 1967 to Germany and the United Kingdom. She also did several package dates with Chapel, David Houston, and George Jones. Wynette and Jones began performing "My Elusive Dreams" on the road following an argument with Houston's management. Upon realizing their romantic feelings for one another, Wynette divorced Chapel and married Jones in 1969.

During this time, Wynette went into the studio to record the single "Stand by Your Man". Reportedly written by Wynette and Billy Sherrill in 15 minutes, the song's emphasis on women standing by their husbands made her a spokeswoman for the working class housewife. It also received criticism from the feminist movement who found it too conservative. "Stand by Your Man" topped the US and Canadian country charts, reached number 19 on the US Hot 100 and later topped the United Kingdom chart. A corresponding LP of the same name reached number two on the US country albums chart.

In the wake of "Stand by Your Man", Wynette received a series of accolades. In 1969, she joined the cast of the Grand Ole Opry and won her second Grammy award. She won the 1969 Top Female Vocalist accolade from the Academy of Country Music and three back-to-back honors for Female Vocalist of the Year from the Country Music Association (1968, 1969 and 1970). Her 1969 compilation, Tammy's Greatest Hits, was among the first female country albums to certify gold (and later platinum) by the Recording Industry Association of America. Critics had also taken notice of her music. Greg Adams of AllMusic described the Stand by Your Man LP as "consistent" and gave it five stars. Writer Kurt Wolff found her material "from the mid-60's onward" created "a solid female perspective on country radio that the listening public badly craved." Meanwhile, rock critic Robert Christgau found Wynette's "sultry" delivery to have "archetypal power".

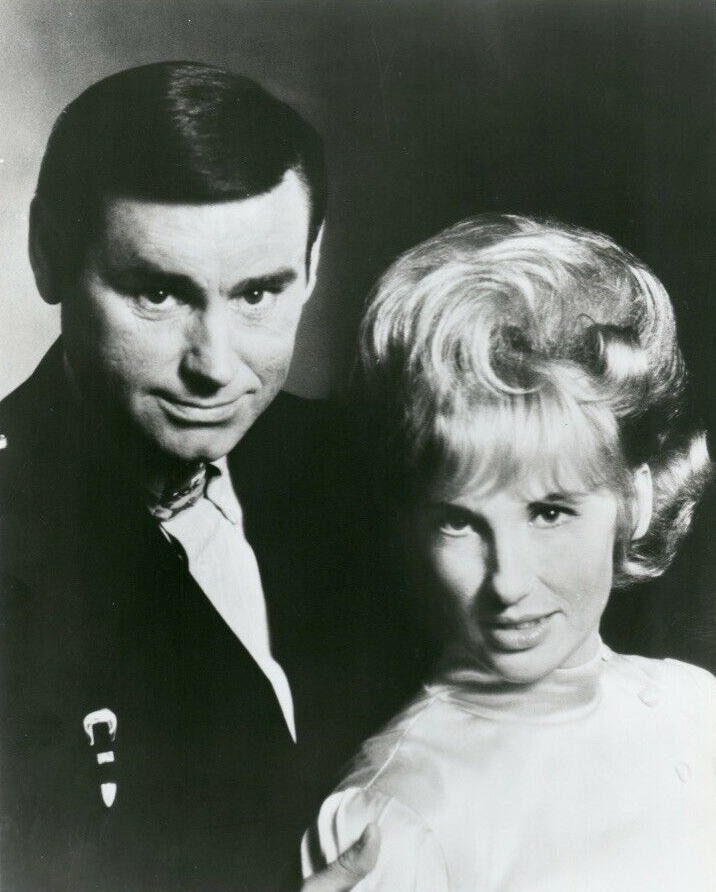
In 1969, Wynette married George Jones. They recorded and toured together as a duet. Their relationship went through several challenges, ultimately ending in their 1975 divorce.

Wynette was among country music's most commercially successful and popular artists. She followed it with ten more singles that topped the 'US country chart: "Singing My Song" (1969), "The Ways to Love a Man" (1969), "He Loves Me All the Way" (1970), "Run Woman Run" (1970), "Good Lovin' (Makes It Right)" (1971), "Bedtime Story" (1971), "My Man (Understands)" (1972), "'Til I Get It Right" (1972), "Kids Say the Darndest Things" (1973), and "Another Lonely Song" (1973). Most of these songs followed similar themes about housewives attempting to keep their husbands happy or the effects that troubled marriages have on children. Additionally, Epic Records released a series of studio albums by Wynette during this period. Between 1969 and 1970 alone, Epic released six original albums. This included the 1969 gospel LP, Inspiration, and the 1970 holiday LP, Christmas with Tammy. Additional album projects featured her number one and top ten singles of the period. Of these LPs, Tammy's Touch (1970) topped the US country LP's chart. The Ways to Love a Man (1970), The First Lady (1971) and My Man (1972) reached the Billboard country top five.

Jones and Wynette had been wanting to record together since they married. Although they started touring together in 1969, they could not record together until 1971, when Jones was released from his previous contract. Their first single was a remake of Jones's solo release, "Take Me". In 1971, it climbed to number nine on the US country chart and number 12 on the Canadian country chart. Their first studio LP, We Go Together (1971), reached the top five of the Billboard country albums chart. Their 1972 single, "The Ceremony", was also a top ten single in the US and Canada. Altogether, Epic label issued seven studio albums of Jones and Wynette duets. The pair were considered among country music's most successful and well-known duet partnerships. Touring as a packaged duo, they were often referred to as the "President and First Lady". Their tour bus was labeled "Mr. and Mrs. Country Music".

However, their marriage had several challenges which made their day-to-day life difficult, such as Jones's alcoholism. Jones often missed shows after drinking too much, which increased Wynette's growing frustration with their relationship. The couple's marital problems prompted her to file for divorce in 1973, but the pair reconciled. Shortly afterwards, they recorded the autobiographical single, "We're Gonna Hold On". It became their first song to top the US country chart. An album of the same name charted at number three on the Country LP's list. It was followed by the top ten single "We Loved It Away" in 1974. After a fight between the couple, Wynette filed for divorce again. This time however, the pair went through with it and they officially split in 1975. Despite their divorce, they were coaxed back into the studio once more to record the album Golden Ring. Its title track became the duo's second US number one country single, while also reaching number five in Canada in 1976.

=== 1976–1984: Solo return with "'Til I Can Make It on My Own" and continued success ===
Despite her divorce from George Jones, Wynette had to continue her career. However, she had anxiety about doing so. Fans would shout, "Where's George?" during most early performances following their split. "Even though I'd been on stage for eight years, I didn't know how to communicate with the people," she recalled. Previously a packaged act with Jones, Wynette created her own stage show for the first time. She hired the Gatlin Brothers (Larry Gatlin and his brothers Rudy and Steve) to be her road band. She also hired several women as part of her road crew. Wynette included up-tempo gospel songs to energize the audience along with slow ballads that were "extraordinarily intimate," according to writers Mary A. Bufwack and Robert K. Oermann.

In 1976, she returned to the top of the country charts with "'Til I Can Make It on My Own". It was her first US chart-topper as a solo artist in almost three years. The song was co-written by Wynette and reflected her life following the divorce. According to Wynette, it was her favorite song she recorded in her career. Her album of the same name reached number three on the US country LPs chart. "'Til I Can Make It on My Own" was nominated for Song of the Year by the Country Music Association, while Wynette herself was nominated for Female Vocalist of the Year. Her next release, "You and Me", also topped the US country chart, while a corresponding studio LP reached the country albums top five. A duet with Jones recorded the year before, "Near You", also topped the North American country charts in 1976.

Several incidents in Wynette's personal life also occurred during this period. These incidents included several short-term relationships, house burglaries, and alleged kidnappings. She also developed health problems that led to a dependence on pain killers. Yet, her commercial success continued. Although none of her solo singles topped the charts, she continued reaching the top ten. Both "(Let's Get Together) One Last Time" and "One of a Kind" reached number six on the UScountry chart in 1977. Through 1979, Wynette had three more solo releases reach the top ten: "Womanhood", "They Call It Making Love" and "No One Else in the World".

Critics and writers highlighted Wynette's music of this period. Bufwack and Oermann observed that her late 1970s singles "took a candid look at modern sexuality". AllMusic's Thom Jurek found 1977's One of a Kind LP to evoke the performances of a "true diva" and "country music's reigning queen". Critic Eugene Chadbourne found the musical quality of 1978's Womanhood to be mediocre and gave it two-and-a-half stars.

As the 1980s progressed, Wynette continued having commercial success but with less frequency. In 1980, she reunited with George Jones for the duet single "Two Story House". It reached number two on the Billboard country chart and number one on the RPM country chart. However, it also proved to be her final American top five single. The pair also reunited for several shows including a performance at Wembley Stadium and an HBO special. In 1980, Wynette told Billy Sherrill that she was ready to work with a new record producer. "She needed fresh blood, fresh ideas," Sherrill commented in 2010. The final Sherrill-produced album was 1980's Only Lonely Sometimes. Both singles from the LP ("He Was There (When I Needed You)" and "Starting Over") reached number 17 on the Billboard country chart.

Several years prior, Wynette married for the fifth (and final) time to George Richey. The pair previously wrote songs together, but after marrying, he became her full-time manager. Besides business affairs, he also produced several of her albums. Following the Chips Moman-produced You Brought Me Back (1981), Richey produced Wynette's 1982 LP, Soft Touch. The album spawned "Another Chance", which became her first top ten single in several years. Additional early 1980s singles made the country top 20: "Crying in the Rain" (1981), "You Still Get to Me in My Dreams" (1982), and "A Good Night's Love" (1983). Wynette's record sales began to wane following 1982. Both the albums Good Love & Heartbreak (1982) and Even the Strong Get Lonely (1983) reached only the Billboard country top 60. Wynette's singles also reached progressively lower chart positions following 1982. This included "Still in the Ring" and a cover of John Prine's "Unwed Fathers".

=== 1985–1998: Commercial comeback, collaborations and final years ===
Around 1985, Wynette made changes to her declining career. She hired California-based Stan Moress to serve as her manager. Moress had Wynette cut her hair, change her wardrobe, and incorporate choreography into her shows. Steve Buckingham also started producing Wynette's next album, which was to feature a duet. Although she wanted to collaborate with Merle Haggard, she was instead paired with Mark Gray. Gray had left Exile before that band's shift from pop to country, and was beginning a solo country music career of his own at the time. Their result was a cover of the pop song "Sometimes When We Touch". Wynette and Gray's rendition peaked at number six on the US country chart in 1985. It became her first top ten recording in four years. The Buckingham collaboration resulted in Wynette's 1985 album of the same name, which charted at number 32 on the US country LPs survey. Amidst a commercial comeback, Wynette also faced several setbacks. In late 1986, Wynette entered the Betty Ford Center to treat her addiction to prescription drugs. Two years later, Wynette and her husband declared bankruptcy following several failed investments.

Wynette's longtime label released her next album titled Higher Ground in 1987. The second Buckingham-produced project, he described it as "a more rural, more back-home" album. It featured collaborations with Emmylou Harris, Ricky Skaggs, The O'Kanes, Gene Watson, and Larry Gatlin. Bufwack and Oermann called it a "landmark LP", while AllMusic gave it a four-star rating. Despite positive reviews, Higher Ground only peaked at number 43 on the US country chart. Its singles proved more commercially successful. In 1987, "Your Love" reached the US and Canadian country top 20, while "Talkin' to Myself Again" reached number 16 on the former. Following Higher Ground, Buckingham told Sony Music executives that it was becoming difficult to think of new album concepts for Wynette. This resulted in a temporary end to their professional partnership. Instead, she was paired with producer Norro Wilson for 1989's Next to You and Bob Montgomery for 1990's Heart Over Mind. Singles spawned from both albums reached positions outside the country top 40.

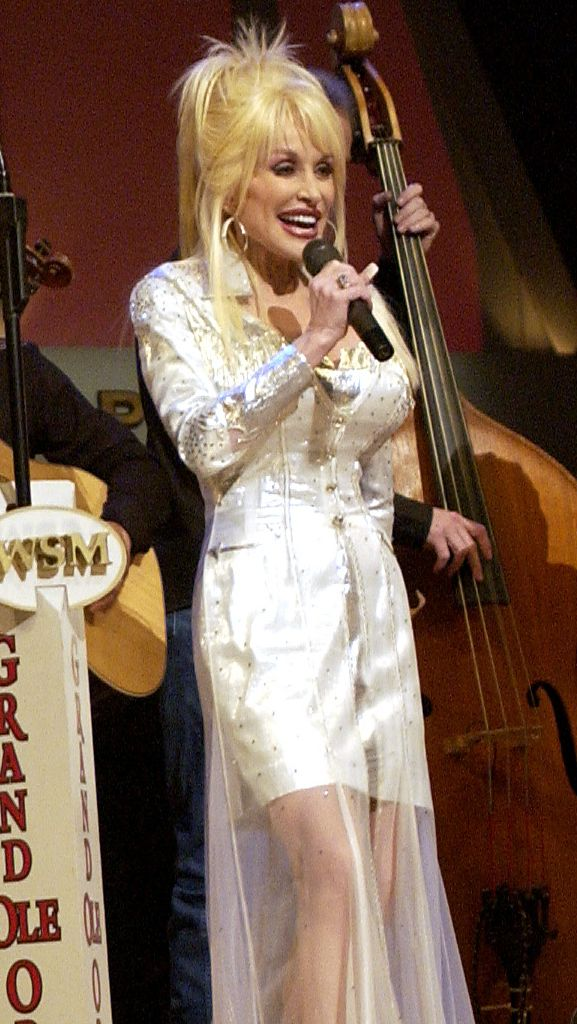
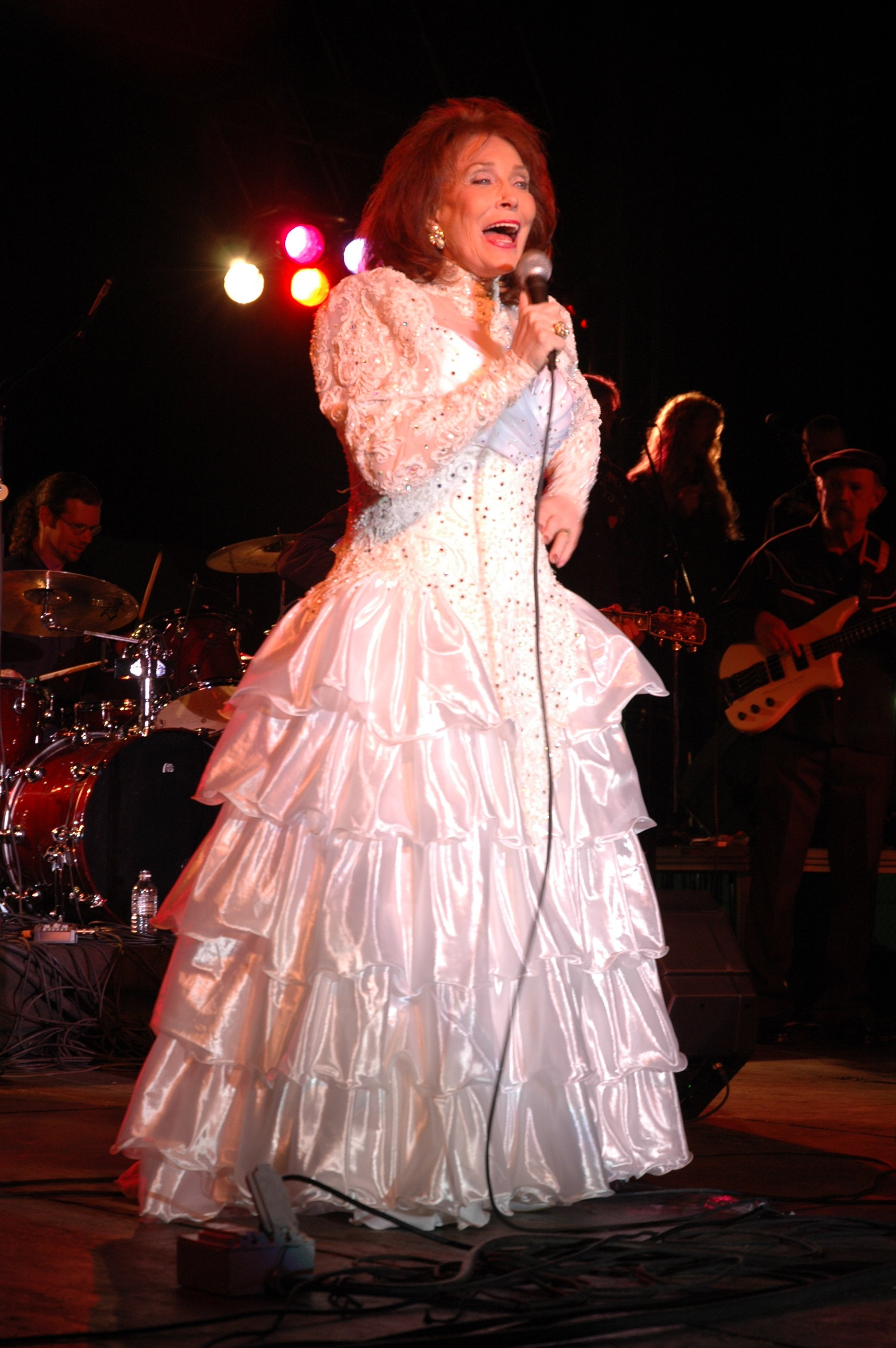
During the 1980s and 1990s, Wynette collaborated with several artists of different genres. Among her collaborations was a trio album with Loretta Lynn and Dolly Parton titled Honky Tonk Angels (1993).

As Wynette's career entered the 1990s, several new team members were hired to manage her business affairs. These included Epic vice president Mark Martinovich, who had to convince the Nashville establishment that Wynette was still marketable. Martinovich had her perform in more diverse settings, including The Bottom Line venue in Greenwich Village. Other new ventures included Wynette recording with British group the KLF. In 1991, they collaborated on the song, "Justified and Ancient (Stand by the JAMs)". KLF member Bill Drummond was a fan of Wynette's and personally called to ask her permission to record the track. Wynette accepted and Drummond helped produce it. Although she had difficulty singing in-time to the track, the song was pieced together by studio engineers when Drummond returned to England. The dance-pop song centering around an imaginary setting called "Mu Mu Land" was considered a departure from Wynette's previous recordings in terms of song choice and production. It became a chart success. By 1992, the single was being routinely played on MTV and reached number one in 18 countries.

In 1993, Wynette joined with Loretta Lynn and Dolly Parton to record the studio album Honky Tonk Angels. Parton herself explained that she wanted to make the project "before one of us goes". Consisting of classic country recordings performed in three-part harmonies, the album reunited Wynette with Steve Buckingham. Several selections on the project were penned by the trio, including one composed by Wynette herself. Honky Tonk Angels reached number six on the Billboard country albums chart and number 42 on the Billboard 200. It was Wynette's first top ten US album in 18 years and her first album in 22 years to certify gold in the United States. AllMusic's Kelly McCartney called it "a fun listen" while the Songwriters Hall of Fame described it as a "landmark album".

In 1994, Wynette released a studio album of duets titled Without Walls. It featured collaborations with notable artists of the era including Melissa Etheridge, Elton John, and Sting. Its first single was a duet with Wynonna Judd titled "Girl Thang", which was among Wynette's final charting singles. Although it did not chart in North America, Without Walls did reach number eight on the ARIA charts in Australia. The project received mixed reviews. BBC called it a "respect-laden series of duets", while biographer Jimmy McDonough called it "cringe-worthy". Health problems continued to affect Wynette into the 1990s as her dependence on prescription drugs increased. She often missed concerts because she was too ill to perform. In the mid-1990s, Wynette was hospitalized with a severe bile duct infection that nearly led to her death. Wynette was visited by George Jones during her recovery, who encouraged her to record another album with him. The result was 1995's One. Released on MCA Records, the album reached number 12 on the Billboard country chart. It was followed by a high-profile duet tour featuring Jones and Wynette as headliners.

In 1995, Wynette was dropped by her long-time label, Epic Records. Despite this, she continued to be a popular concert attraction until her death. During this period, she re-made The Beach Boys' "In My Room" with Brian Wilson. The song proved to be her final recording. Wynette's final concerts and television performances were held in March 1998.

== Other works ==
Other works by Wynette have also appeared outside of music. In 1979, she published a book about her life with author Joan Dew. Released by Simon & Schuster, it was titled Stand by Your Man: An Autobiography. Dew toured with Wynette in the 1970s and wrote down what Wynette told her verbatim.

Wynette's career also took shape through film and television. In 1981, CBS aired a television film about her life, also called Stand by Your Man. Directed by Jerry Jameson, the film featured Annette O'Toole as Wynette while George Jones was portrayed by Tim McIntire. Both actors did their own singing for the roles. It was reviewed unfavorably by newspaper critics. The New York Times commented, "The rags-to-riches sagas, presumably meant to be inspiring, tend to get trapped under a cloud of dreariness," wrote John O'Connor. "Suspicious viewers may legitimately conclude that the whole Tammy Wynette story has yet to be told." Richard Harrington of The Washington Post wrote, "It seems to capitalize on the creative achievement and financial success of the Loretta Lynn film bio, 'Coal Miner's Daughter.' Unfortunately, television will be television, and the results are lackluster and somewhat misleading."

In 1986, Wynette joined the cast of the CBS soap opera Capitol, playing the role of a hair stylist-turned-singer, Darlene Stankowski. It was her first major acting role. In 1987, BBC released a documentary about her life called Stand by Your Dream. A film crew followed Wynette while on the road and at home with her husband. The documentary was directed by Rosemary Bowen-Jones, who commented on it years later: "When you're someone like that, you've kind of rehearsed your life." Throughout her life, Wynette enjoyed cooking, and repeatedly cooked pinto beans on a range on her tour bus. This would inspire her to compile her 1990 cookbook Tammy Wynette's Southern Cookbook, issued by the Pelican Publishing Company. The book featured southern American-inspired recipes used routinely in Wynette's family.

In the 1990s, Wynette received more exposure on television. In 1994, she guest-starred on Burt Reynolds's CBS television program Evening Shade. Fellow country artist K. T. Oslin also appeared on the show. She made a cameo on the sitcom Married... with Children in 1996. Wynette later voiced a role for the animated television show King of the Hill. She portrayed Hank Hill's mother between 1997 and 1998.

Further works about her were released posthumously. Among them were three books that appeared in the years following her death. The first was written by Wynette's daughter, Jaclyn Daly, titled Tammy Wynette: A Daughter Recalls Her Mother's Tragic Life and Death. Daly collaborated on the book with country music biographer Tom Carter. The second was written by Jimmy McDonough and titled Tammy Wynette: Tragic Country Queen. The book offered a detailed account of both Wynette's life and career told through his own words and interviews he gave of those close to Wynette. A second was published by Wynette's fourth child, Georgette Jones, and was titled The Three of Us. The book was focused on Georgette's own account of being Wynette's daughter and living her life with her father, George Jones. It was said Georgette wrote the book in response to the unfavorable portrayal of her mother in Jimmy McDonough's book. A limited series that will focus on Wynette and Jones's marriage began production in mid-2022. Titled George and Tammy, it features Jessica Chastain in the role of Wynette and Michael Shannon as Jones. The series is based on Georgette Jones's memoir and aired its first of six weekly episodes on Showtime December 4, 2022.

== Illness and death ==
Wynette was plagued by health problems throughout her life. Her health declined even more in the final years of her life and she began to look frailer. Nashville writer Alanna Nash recalled watching one of Wynette's final music videos and remembered her physical condition: "Tammy looked ancient, like a plant that had withered up about to die. I thought, 'this woman is dying – why isn't somebody doing something?'" Wynette died on April 6, 1998, while sleeping at her Nashville, Tennessee, home. She was 55 years old. Husband George Richey and Wynette were sleeping all day on adjacent living room couches when he discovered that evening that she was dead. Her death was certified by her doctor, Wallis Marsh, who flew from Pennsylvania to make it official. He stated in his original report that Wynette died from a blood clot in her lung.

In the days following her death, performers and other industry insiders reacted to her death. "She'll always be dear to me. She'll always be special. She'll always live in our memories," said Dolly Parton. "Tammy Wynette was an American original, and we will miss her," said Bill and Hillary Clinton. "We once made a record called One of a Kind," commented producer Billy Sherrill. "There are no more words. The words have all been said", he added.

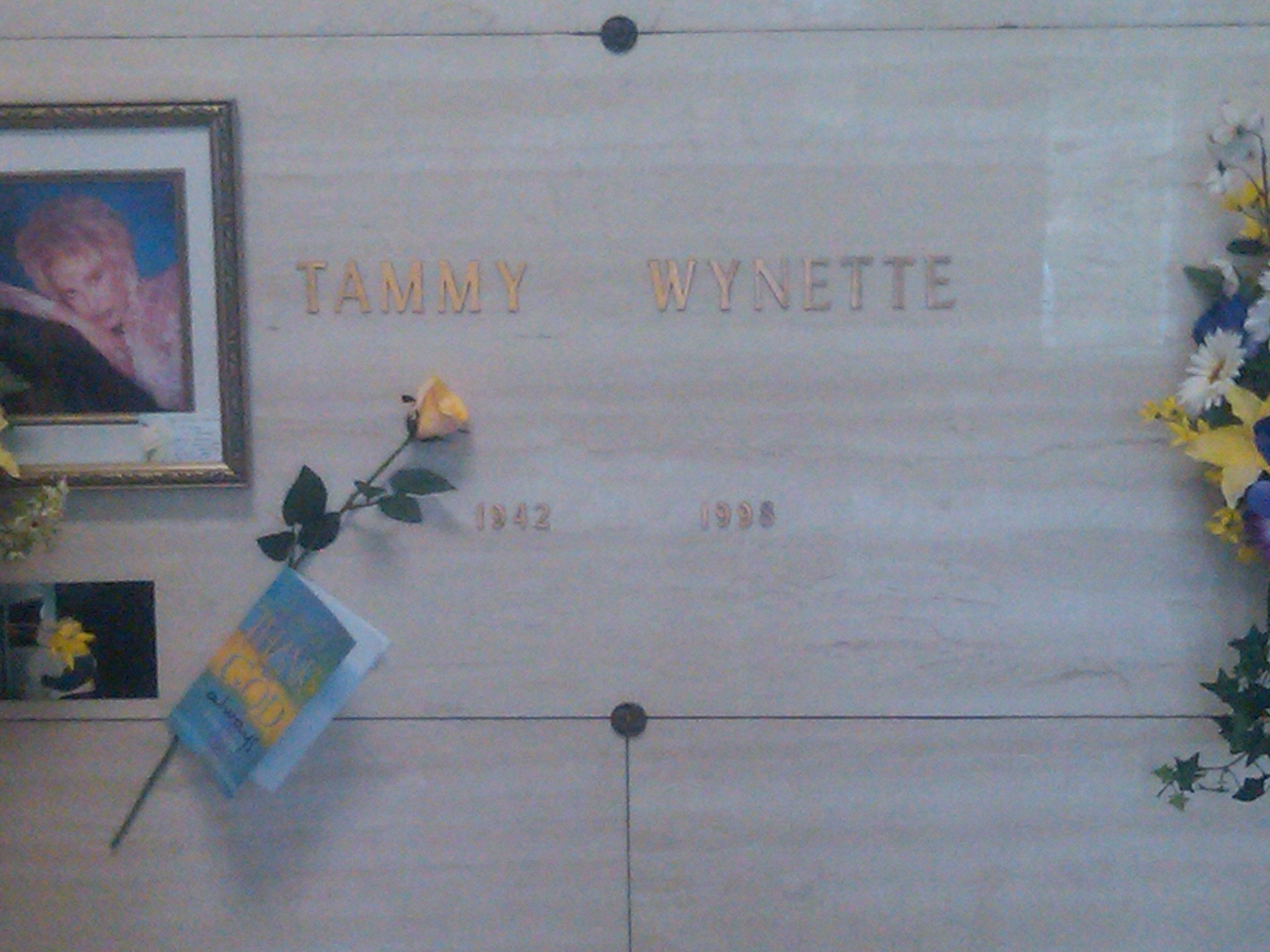
Wynette's final resting place at Woodlawn Memorial Park. The name on her grave was changed three times, eventually changed back to her stage name as pictured here.

A public memorial service, attended by about 1,500 people, was held at Nashville's Ryman Auditorium on April 9, 1998. The service was televised live by cable networks CNN and The Nashville Network. Parton gave remarks and performed a specially written song, closing her performance with a chorus from "I Will Always Love You". Country stars Wynonna Judd and Lorrie Morgan also performed while Merle Haggard offered his performance through a prerecorded video. Eulogies were given by other notable country artists, including Naomi Judd. A private, graveside service had been held earlier with a crypt entombment at Nashville's Woodlawn Memorial Park.

According to her daughters, a will written by Wynette years prior had provided a trust. The specifics of the trust included money to be given to her four daughters over a period of time. The yellow legal pad which included this information (written by Wynette herself) was missing in the days following her death. Instead, Wynette's daughters were denied their inheritance of their mother's will by George Richey. Executive decisions were instead given to Richey and his brother, Carl Richardson. Richey received a one million dollar estate policy, along with an additional 1.4 million dollars on his own insurance policy. According to daughter Jackie, Richey was "evasive" when asked about the daughters' own payouts. Surprised by the will, Wynette's daughters began to question their mother's death.

Further detective work was conducted by local television reporter Jennifer Kraus. She discovered that a local company called Care Solutions Inc. had been delivering prescription drugs to Wynette's home through 1998. In April 1999, Wynette's daughters filed a wrongful death lawsuit against her doctor, Wallis Marsh, Care Solutions, and George Richey. The sisters claimed they were responsible for the country star's demise. Furthermore, they claimed that Richey refused to take advice from Dr. Marsh. According to Dr. Marsh, he had told Richey to take Wynette to a hospital in the days leading up to her death. In 1999, Wynette's body was exhumed and an autopsy was given. The medical examiner who performed the autopsy declared Wynette died from cardiac arrhythmia. The autopsy also revealed that Wynette had several powerful drugs in her system at the time of her death including Versed and Phenergan. Jackie Daly noted that her mother was regularly taking these drugs at the time of her death. Wynette used syringes and was later fitted with a permanent catheter into her side that allowed drugs to directly enter her bloodstream. The catheter was also used for Wynette to inject food because of her intestinal issues.

Richey was later dropped as a defendant from the suit, a court dismissed the claims against Care Solutions, and the remaining parties reached a confidential settlement with the doctor. Wynette's remains were re-interred in the Woodlawn Cross Mausoleum at Woodlawn Memorial Park, Nashville, Tennessee.

In March 2012, the name on Wynette's tomb was changed from "Tammy Wynette" to "Virginia W. Richardson", her legal married name at the time of her death. Wynette's daughters were angered by the name change. Through Facebook, they launched a petition to urge fans to help change the name of her tomb back to "Tammy Wynette". More than 3,000 fans voted in support of the petition. In March 2014, the name on the tomb was changed back through a court order.

== Personal life ==
=== First marriage ===
Wynette married Euple Byrd (who was five years her senior) when she was 17, one month before her high-school graduation. She originally intended to marry his brother, D.C., but the relationship ended when he remarried his first wife. Wynette was not yet of legal age so her mother was required to sign the marriage paperwork, but she refused and instead forced her daughter to leave the family home; her grandfather signed the papers that legalized their marriage. Byrd and Wynette fought throughout their relationship. Many of their marital conflicts stemmed from Byrd being unable to hold down a steady job. After becoming pregnant again, Wynette asked Euple to leave but he kept returning. After one argument, Wynette suffered a "nervous breakdown", according to biographer Jimmy McDonough, and her family took her to a psychiatric hospital. Doctors diagnosed her with depression and gave her 12 rounds of electric shock treatment.

Upon returning from the hospital, she still insisted on filing for divorce. However, her mother disapproved and Wynette secretly moved with her children to Birmingham, Alabama. While in Birmingham, Byrd returned and Wynette agreed to give their marriage one more chance. However, their problems continued and they eventually divorced in 1965. In one of their final encounters, Wynette told Byrd her ambitions of becoming a country performer. He then replied, "Dream on baby, dream on." A decade later, Byrd appeared at one of her concerts. When he asked for her autograph, she signed it, "Dream on, baby. Love, Tammy". Wynette and Byrd would later see each other at family functions when he began attempting to re-establish his relationship with their three daughters. In 1996, Byrd was killed in a car crash.

=== Second marriage ===
Wynette met her second husband, Don Chapel, upon moving to Nashville in 1965. Chapel was a front desk attendant at the Red Anchor Motel in Nashville where Wynette was staying. The pair developed a romantic relationship through their day-to-day interactions at the motel. Chapel was also an aspiring songwriter and musician. He would later write several popular country songs, including one made commercially successful by George Jones titled "When the Grass Grows Over Me". The couple married in 1967. Her growing affection for George Jones would lead to the couple's divorce in 1968. She later claimed in her autobiography that Chapel had taken and traded nude photographs of her to other male colleagues. Chapel denied the allegations and later filed a lawsuit against her for $37 million. The couple had no children and Chapel died in 2015.

=== Third marriage ===
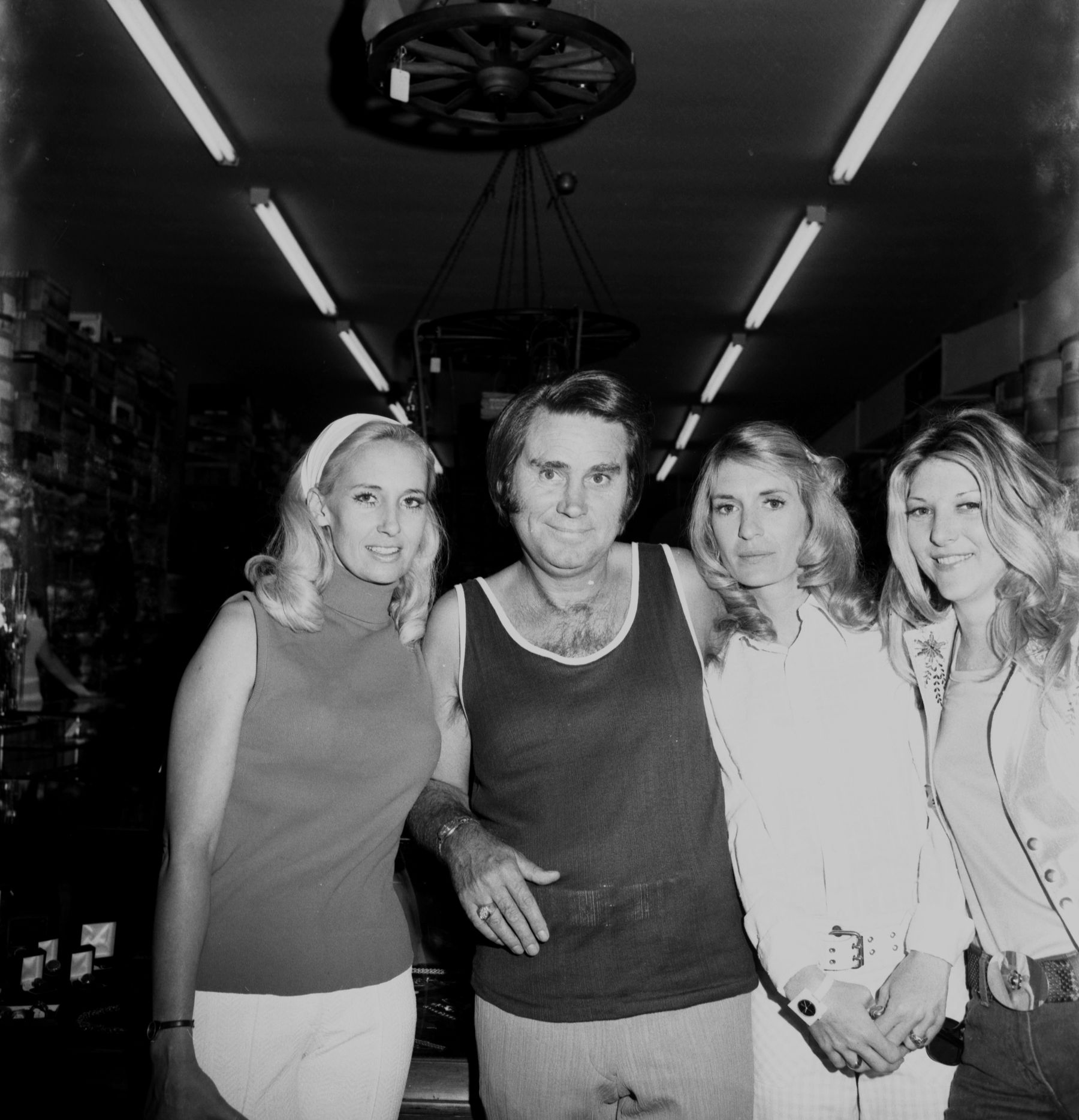
George Jones and Tammy Wynette, 1973 with hairdressers Janette and Nanette Smith

Wynette first met George Jones while on tour with him in the late 1960s. Jones was also friendly with her second husband, Don Chapel, and the three often spent time together. According to Wynette, Jones helped her one evening when one of her children was hospitalized with food poisoning. The following day, Jones stopped by Chapel and Wynette's home. Chapel was irritated with Wynette because she would not stop playing Jones's music on their record player. Chapel then began directing derogatory words and profanity at her. Angered by Chapel's conduct, Jones overturned the couple's dining room table. Jones and Wynette then proceeded to confess their love for each other to Chapel. Immediately after the incident, Jones escorted Wynette and her three daughters out of the Chapel home. They never returned.

After leaving Chapel, they flew to Mexico to get a quick divorce. However, her marriage to Chapel was later annulled because she remarried quickly after her first marriage to Euple Byrd. Jones and Wynette officially wed on February 16, 1969, in Ringgold, Georgia. The couple then proceeded to move into a 6,000-square-foot (560 m^{2}) plantation home in Lakeland, Florida. They later built a performance venue on the property, which they titled "Old Plantation Music Park".

Jones and Wynette's marriage was tumultuous. A major factor that affected their relationship was Jones's alcoholism. When he drank, he became difficult to control. This led to Wynette becoming angry with Jones's behavior. For a short period, Jones stopped drinking but then relapsed. In an effort for Jones to retain sobriety, they moved from Lakeland back to Nashville in 1972. However, Jones relapsed again, which caused further friction in their marriage. She attempted to stop his drinking herself. To stop Jones from driving under the influence, Wynette began hiding his car keys. On one day, Jones could not find where Wynette had hidden his keys. As a result, he took the keys to their riding lawnmower and successfully rode it into town and back to purchase alcohol.

In a separate incident, Wynette claimed in her autobiography that Jones had chased her through their home with a loaded rifle. Jones later denied this in his own autobiography. Wynette filed for divorce in 1973, but the couple ultimately reconciled. By this point, they had moved to a larger home, also located in Nashville. However, their problems continued. Jones would often disappear for days at a time. In one attempt to locate him, Wynette drove her children and two friends down to Florida but were unsuccessful in their search. After a recording session between the couple in late 1974, Jones disappeared again. Disappointed and upset, Wynette filed for divorce for a second time. It was finalized on January 8, 1975. After the divorce became public, Wynette told the press, "George is one of those people that can't tolerate happiness. If everything is right, there's something in him that makes him destroy it."

Wynette and Jones's relationship was dramatized in a miniseries, starring Jessica Chastain and Michael Shannon. The miniseries was created by Abe Sylvia and based on the memoir of the couple's daughter, Georgette, and directed by John Hillcoat. It was released on Showtime, CMT and the Paramount Network.

=== Short-term relationships and fourth marriage ===
Following her divorce from George Jones, Wynette was romantically linked to several people. She was briefly involved with Rudy Gatlin, a brother of Larry Gatlin and then-member of her touring band. According to Joan Dew, Larry did not approve of the relationship. Additionally, the couple received negative publicity after a fire was mysteriously started at Wynette's home. Rumors circulated that Rudy had started the fire. Amidst the publicity, their relationship ended. Wynette also dated actor Burt Reynolds during this period. The pair met while performing on a television show hosted by country artist Jerry Reed. Their relationship was temporarily kept secret but was eventually revealed by the press in 1977. The couple spent time in Florida, where Wynette owned a home. During one evening, Reynolds was taking a bath at her home when she found him unconscious. She was able to pull Reynolds out before he drowned. He was later diagnosed with having low blood sugar. Knowing that Reynolds was not ready to commit to a relationship, Wynette chose to end their romance. However, they remained friends until Wynette's death in 1998.

Wynette then met real estate developer Michael Tomlin through her friend Nan Crofton. It was a brief courtship, as they married only weeks after meeting. The couple wed on July 18, 1976, at her Nashville home. Tomlin was known for renting private jets, drinking Dom Pérignon, and driving a Mercedes-Benz. It has since been claimed by several of Wynette's friends that Tomlin was not truthful about his life. "It was all a facade. The furniture in his office was rented", said Joan Dew. Following the couple's honeymoon in Hawaii, Wynette claimed that Tomlin spent a lot of money and attempted to fire a gun on the beach, which scared her children. The marriage was annulled six weeks following their wedding.

=== Final marriage to George Richey ===
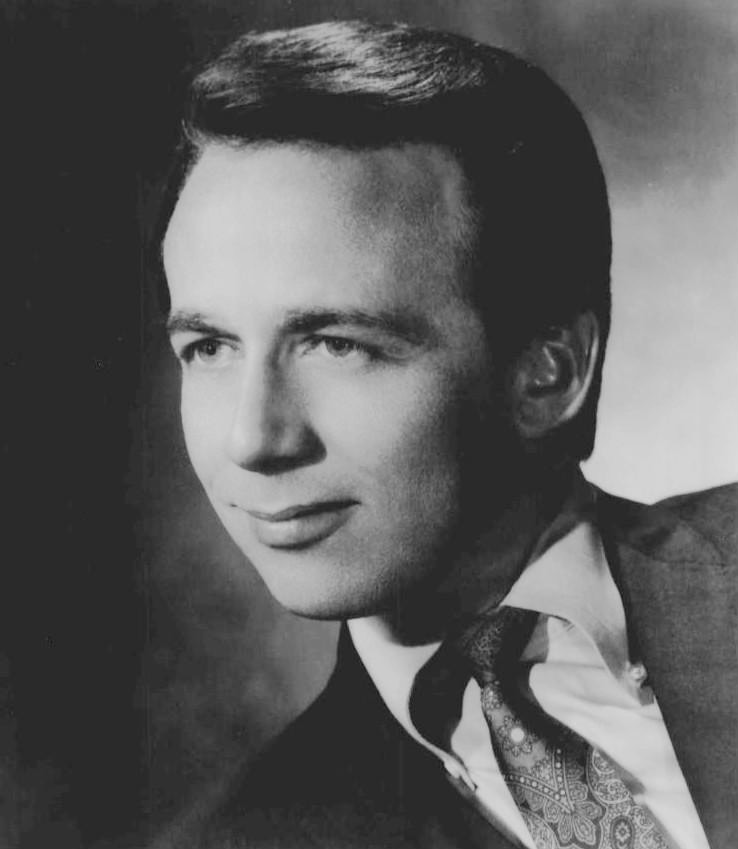
Wynette was married to songwriter and producer, George Richey, until her death in 1998.

On July 6, 1978, Wynette married her fifth husband, George Richey. Richey had previously been a songwriter, music publisher, and record producer. Many of the songs Richey wrote had been recorded by George Jones, Merle Haggard, and Wynette herself. The two already had a professional relationship but a series of events in Wynette's personal life changed their relationship. This included several instances when Richey visited Wynette while she was recovering from illnesses at the hospital. After a recording session one evening, Richey professed his love for Wynette. The pair then married. Richey then became his wife's full-time manager. Among his first moves as manager was to fire several of Wynette's female road crew members. "I cannot start a life with and build a relationship with Tammy and her girls when I'm livin' in a female dormitory", he told a female co-worker. He also took control of her finances.

Wynette's marriage to Richey caused friction between her loved ones. According to Wynette's youngest daughter, Georgette Jones, Richey attempted to keep his wife away from her close friends. Georgette also claimed to have been estranged from her father (George Jones) because Richey did not want her to see him. Older daughter, Jackie Daly, claimed that Richey had helped to "enable" her mother's drug addiction. Singer Lorrie Morgan believed that Richey was only interested in his new wife's money and earnings. George Jones commented, "I believe a lot of things went on that shouldn't have went on. Let me put it that way." Wynette told the press that she loved Richey, while family and friends claimed that she regretted her decision to marry him. "It was an emotionally abusive relationship," reported Georgette Jones. Nonetheless, the couple remained together until her death in 1998. Richey married Dallas Cowboys cheerleader Sheila Slaughter in 2001. Richey died in 2010 at the age of 74.

=== Children ===
Wynette gave birth to four daughters. Three of her children were from her first marriage to Euple Byrd. Their first child, Gwendolyn Lee, was born on April 14, 1961. Their second, Jaclyn Faye, was born on August 21, 1962. Her third, Tina Denise, was born on March 27, 1965, which was three months early and she weighed only two pounds three ounces (990 g). Four months later, she was diagnosed with spinal meningitis and kept in isolation at a hospital for 17 days. Wynette borrowed several thousand dollars from her uncle to afford the hospital bills. Tina eventually made a full recovery. In 1975, Tina would record an album with her mother and stepfather titled George & Tammy & Tina.

In October 1970, Wynette had her fourth daughter, Tamala Georgette Jones, her only child from her relationship with George Jones. Georgette would eventually create her own music career as an adult. She has since recorded five albums and toured internationally as a country artist. Since their mother's death, Jaclyn and Georgette have worked to keep the legacy of their mother alive. Both daughters wrote memoirs about their mother following her death. The first was penned by Jaclyn Daly in 2000, titled Tammy Wynette: A Daughter Recalls Her Mother's Tragic Life and Death. Georgette would also publish a memoir of her childhood with Wynette and her father in 2011, titled The Three of Us: Growing Up with Tammy and George.

=== Controversies ===
A series of incidents occurred over the course of Wynette's personal life that were considered controversial. Among the most well-known was an incident in which Wynette claimed to have been kidnapped. On October 4, 1978, Wynette went shopping at Green Hills Shopping Center (now The Mall at Green Hills) in Nashville. Upon returning to her unlocked car, Wynette claimed a man was in the back seat with a gun. She was then released 80 miles away in Giles County, Tennessee, and claimed to have been suffering from neck injuries. She sought help from a local resident who brought her a cold wet rag and called Wynette's family. Richey appeared at the scene to retrieve her.

After the alleged kidnapping, more incidents occurred that were said to have been linked to the same event. Several days later, Wynette's youngest daughter (Georgette) was nearly abducted from school. Wynette then appeared in Columbia, South Carolina, to give a concert. Following the show, Wynette received a crumpled-up note backstage that said, "I'm still around, I'll get you." An FBI investigation occurred following these incidents that proved inconclusive and no arrests were ever made. Several rumors then began circulating about the alleged kidnapping. One rumor centered around ex-husband George Jones attempting to plot revenge on his ex-wife. Another rumor centered around Wynette using the kidnapping to cover up infidelity to Richey. Both Jackie Daly and Georgette Jones claimed the kidnapping was staged in an attempt to cover up being beaten by Richey.

During the late 1970s, a series of burglaries and break-ins occurred at Wynette's Nashville residence. One night while she was sleeping, Wynette woke to a fire. She attempted to call the police, but her phone lines were cut. Three rooms were destroyed from the incident. Police never discovered who had started the fire, despite giving several people lie detector tests. Once again, no arrests were ever made.

In 1992, 24 years after it topped the country chart, Wynette's signature song ("Stand by Your Man") became the subject of political debate. When Hillary Clinton was asked during a 60 Minutes interview about her marriage to then-presidential candidate Bill Clinton (who had been accused of infidelity), she said, "I'm not sitting here as some little woman standing by my man like Tammy Wynette". The end of this quotation has also appeared as "some little woman, standing by my man and baking cookies, like Tammy Wynette." However, the reference to cookie-baking more likely comes from an unrelated remark by Hillary Clinton: "I suppose I could have stayed home and baked cookies and had teas, but what I decided to do was to fulfill my profession, which I entered before my husband was in public life." The remark received widespread media and press attention. Wynette wrote to Clinton, saying, "With all that is in me, I resent your caustic remark. I believe you have offended every true country-music fan and every person who has made it on their own with no one to take them to the White House." Hillary then remarked to the press that she had no intention of speaking negatively about Wynette and that she enjoyed Wynette's music. She then personally called Wynette and apologized to her.

=== Health problems and drug addiction ===
In 1970, Wynette underwent a hysterectomy following the birth of her fourth daughter. This procedure started a series of health issues that affected Wynette for the rest of her life. Following the hysterectomy, Wynette developed an infection that resulted in a continual build-up of scar tissue (also known as adhesions). The infection and hysterectomy resulted in lifelong problems with her gall bladder. The pain was so severe that Wynette started taking pain killer medication to alleviate her symptoms.

Beginning in the early 1970s, she started taking Valium and regularly used it on the road before concerts. However, her adhesions continued and Wynette had a series of operations to stop them from forming. She then was being prescribed more painkillers, which caused a drug addiction starting in the 1970s. Along with Valium, Wynette also was prescribed Demerol to alleviate her stomach cramps and in time began taking the drug when she was not in pain. When Demerol pills became ineffective in warding off symptoms of withdrawal, she resorted to taking Demerol by injection. Members of her road crew administered some of these injections after one of Wynette's doctors trained them how to do so. Wynette's doctors soon realized that she had grown addicted to the medication they had prescribed and ceased giving prescriptions. In turn, Wynette found other physicians in various locations around the United States who would unwittingly give her the same prescriptions. Some nights on the road, Wynette scheduled overnight stops of the tour bus at hospitals, where she could acquire yet more pain killers. During this period, Wynette also underwent surgeries to remove nodules on her vocal cords and a surgery for a kidney problem.

Wynette's drug problem became public for the first time in November 1986 when she announced she would enter the Betty Ford Center for treatment. Her public appearances were then canceled until the start of 1987. Three weeks into the six-week treatment program, Wynette began having stomach pain following an afternoon meal. She was then hospitalized for an intestinal blockage. The blockage revealed that previous surgeries had caused a narrowing of the area where food left her stomach. She then had an eight-hour operation where she said 25 percent of her stomach was removed. She was then put back on the same drugs to alleviate the pain, which reinstated her addiction to painkillers.

Wynette continued abusing painkillers into the 1990s. During this time, she started taking Dilaudid for pain. Wynette often carried the drug in her purse. In 1993, she entered the hospital after developing a bile duct infection. She was in critical condition because of the infection's severity. Her blood pressure dropped and she was in a coma for several days. She later made a full recovery. In the final years of her life, Wynette was often given oxygen and IV treatments to alleviate further medical problems she developed. All the while, she continued to abuse drugs and was routinely being injected with pain medication until the end of her life.

== Artistry ==
=== Musical styles ===
Wynette was marketed as a country artist throughout her career and considered the genre to be the roots of her musical style. While Billy Sherrill served as her producer, he imparted his style of Nashville sound, also called "countrypolitan", a style of country characterized by heavy use of string sections and backing vocals. Jon Pareles of The New York Times called her "the standard-bearer of an elaborately orchestrated Nashville sound." Marcus K. Dowling of CMT commented that "the birth of the blend of blue-collar roots and countrypolitan flair that defined four decades of female country stars can be associated with Wynette." She also released music in country's sub-genres honky tonk and country pop.

Wynette's signature recording, "Stand by Your Man", was often considered to be about women remaining faithful to their husbands through difficult times. Mary A. Bufwack and Robert K. Oermann stated that the song "typecast Tammy as the long-suffering housewife, forlornly putting up with abuse for the sake of love." Jon Pareles wrote in 1998 that it "established Ms. Wynette in the role of a long-suffering but determinedly loyal wife, holding the family together even when her husband strayed."

The song and its concept drew criticism as well, including from the women's liberation movement who were gaining political traction when the single was released in 1968. Many feminists criticized it for influencing housewives to view themselves as subservient to their husbands. Sherrill explained to The Wall Street Journal his reasons for composing it: "I reworked the lyrics so the story came from the perspective of a woman singing to another woman—as if she were giving advice to a friend who was a little unsure about how to hold on to her man." "All I wanted to say in the song was, 'Be understanding. Be supportive'", Wynette herself later commented.

The song helped develop a sound and style that made her commercially successful in the next several years following "Stand by Your Man". Number one singles such as "Singing My Song", "I'll See Him Through", "The Ways to Love a Man", and "He Loves Me All the Way" followed similar themes about housewives staying faithful to their husbands. While she was often stereotyped for only recording songs about housewives, her song choices reflected various feminine perspectives. The 1967 single "Your Good Girl's Gonna Go Bad" warned a husband that his wife will start behaving like the rowdy women he interacts with at the bar. In the 1982 single "Another Chance", a woman chooses not to take her partner back after reassessing her life as a single woman. In her 1983 single "Unwed Fathers", Wynette described the scrutiny and societal backlash faced by teenage mothers.

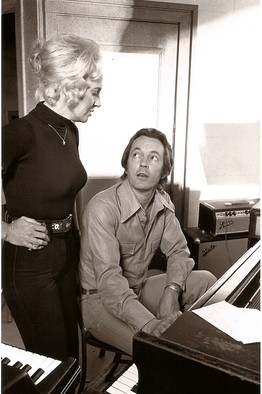
Wynette in the recording studio with her producer, Billy Sherrill, c. 1970

Wynette was also a songwriter and wrote many of her most popular recordings. She co-wrote "Stand by Your Man", along with the number one singles "Singing My Song", "The Ways to Love a Man", "We Sure Can Love Each Other", "Another Lonely Song", and "'Til I Can Make It on My Own".

=== Voice ===
Wynette had a mezzo-soprano vocal range. She was known for delivering singing performances with an emotional vulnerability that has been described as a "teardrop" vocal style. This delivery also helped her become billed as the "Heroine of Heartbreak". Her original producer was the first to give Wynette the "teardrop" moniker. The Country Music Hall of Fame wrote, "Her gripping, teardrop-in-every-note vocal style seemed to weep with emotion, while she elaborated on the theme that suffering ennobles a woman." Other publications described Wynette's emotional depth in other ways. Rolling Stone wrote, "Tammy could sustain power and complexity, whether whispering in your ear or shoving you up against a wall of sound." The New York Times wrote, "When the songs moved toward honky-tonk or old-fashioned weepers, Ms. Wynette did more than navigate the melody dutifully; her voice showed the emotional depth that was smothered elsewhere." In 2023, Rolling Stone ranked Wynette at number 127 on its list of the 200 Greatest Singers of All Time.

=== Influences ===
Before marrying George Jones, Wynette idolized him first as a country singer. Her mother owned all of Jones's records and Wynette was fascinated by his phrasing. She often sang his songs to pass the time while picking cotton on her family's farm during childhood. Wynette also cited female country artists Patsy Cline and Skeeter Davis as early influences on her music. Wynette also listened to early recordings of Billie Jo Spears after discovering her music once moving to Nashville. She learned to harmonize in the recording studio by listening to Davis's "The End of the World". She cited Hank Williams as an early inspiration. She recalled listening to Williams's records every night. Outside of country music, Wynette also was influenced by R&B music. She also credited Ray Charles and the Platters as influences on her music.

== Legacy, influence and awards ==
Wynette helped bring a female's perspective to country music. Her music spoke for rural and working-class women who previously lacked representation in the genre. Wynette's music also helped eliminate some of the male bias at country radio by expanding women into the record-buying public. Along with Patsy Cline, Loretta Lynn, Kitty Wells and Dolly Parton, Wynette elevated the popularity of female country artists. In total, Wynette had 39 singles reach the Billboard country chart while 20 topped the same chart. She has been said to have sold roughly 30 million records worldwide. Kurt Wolff of Country Music: The Rough Guide called her "the most successful woman country singer of the late 1960s". "Her vibrant, pleading timbre was up to the task of portraying women who have been wronged by their men, and women who are determined to stay in a relationship at any cost," he commented. Edward J. Reily of American Popular Culture Through History called Wynette "one of the most successful female country vocalists of all time."

Wynette's impact led to her being referred to by critics and fans as "The First Lady of Country Music". David Don Drehle of The Washington Post described the title in 1998: "Wynette's voice – raw, broken, sad, knowing – prophesied [...] The First Lady of Country, she came to be known for her string of hurtin' hits." Stephen Thomas Erlewine of AllMusic stated that Wynette achieved the honorary title because she "dominated the country charts". He also commented that both her record production and modern storylines that defined her songs also helped give her the title.

Her partnership with George Jones is considered among country music's most iconic collaborations. Sara Kettler of Biography commented, "Despite many ups and downs – including two divorce filings – the pair still recorded some of the best duets in country music history." Noah Berlatsky of The Atlantic wrote, "The part-schtick, part-sincere corniness that was in different ways so integral to both of their performance styles was multiplied to extravagant levels when they sang together under [Billy] Sherrill's auspices."

Journalist Claudia Levy of The Washington Post called Wynette "one of country music's most influential singers." Her career helped influence an entire generation of female country performers, according to NPR. Faith Hill stated, "Especially with the next generation developing and creating their music, I think it's important they hear Tammy Wynette." Miranda Lambert found that Wynette's "Stand by Your Man" had a double meaning that reflected both the loyalty women have towards spouses and the strength they have as women. Kellie Pickler wanted to bring awareness of her music to a new generation by recording a track titled "Where's Tammy Wynette" for her 2012 album 100 Proof. Reba McEntire credited her as influence and later recorded a song called "Tammy Wynette Kind of Pain" for her 2019 album Stronger Than the Truth. In 2021, Swedish pop band ABBA recorded a country influenced song titled "I Can Be That Woman" for their first and final album in 40 years, Voyage (ABBA album). Member Björn Ulvaeus said the song is "A little gesture to the queen of country, as far as I'm concerned: Tammy Wynette", the lyrics prominently feature a dog named Tammy as well. Other artists who have cited Wynette as an influence include Garth Brooks, Suzy Bogguss, Rosanne Cash, Brandi Carlile, Terri Clark, Sheryl Crow, Sara Evans, Melissa Etheridge, Emmylou Harris, Elton John, Wynonna Judd, Martina McBride, Lorrie Morgan, Carly Pearce, Orville Peck, Taylor Swift, Pam Tillis, Shania Twain, Tanya Tucker, Carrie Underwood, Lee Ann Womack and Trisha Yearwood.

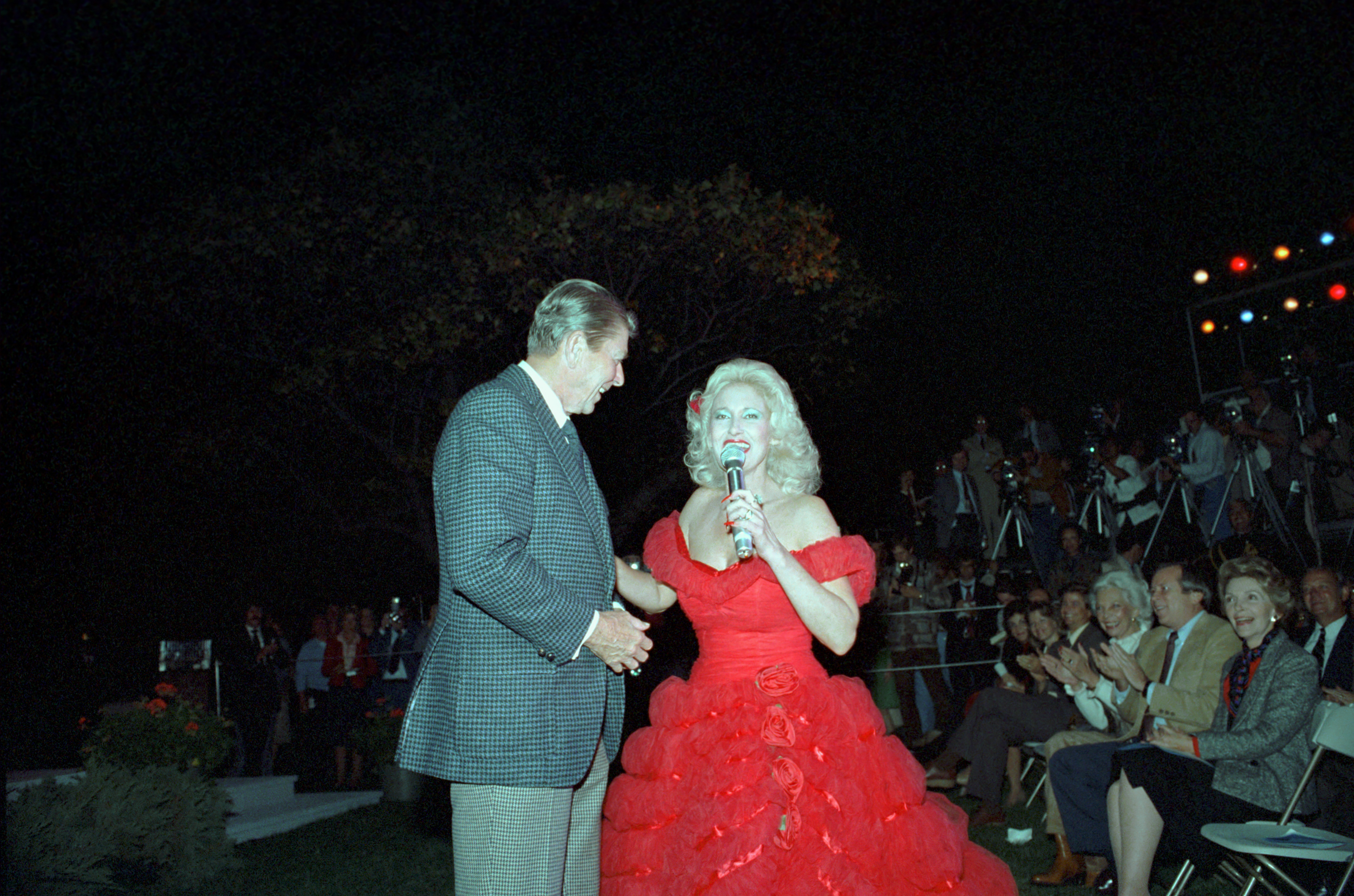
Wynette received several honors in her lifetime. Among them was performing for several American presidents, including Ronald Reagan.

Wynette received a number of honors during her lifetime and posthumously. In 1970, the governor of North Carolina presented her with the Order of the Long Leaf Pine. In 1991, Music City News gave Wynette the Living Legend Award. In 1996, she received the American Music Awards' "Award of Merit", given to artists "who have made truly exceptional contributions to the music industry". In 1993, she was inducted into the Alabama Music Hall of Fame. She also performed for several American presidents during her lifetime. This included performing for Ronald Reagan at The White House in 1983. In 1991, she performed at the Ford's Theatre for then-President George H. W. Bush.

Posthumously, Asylum Records released a tribute album called Tammy Wynette Remembered in 1998. The project featured some of Wynette's most popular songs re-recorded by contemporary artists from various musical genres. Also in 1998, she was inducted into the Country Music Hall of Fame. In 1999, "Stand by Your Man" was inducted into the Grammy Hall of Fame. The song was later added to the National Recording Registry. In 1999, Wynette was included on VH1's list of the 100 Greatest Women of Rock. In 2003, she was posthumously given the Pioneer Award from the Academy of Country Music. Country Music Television included her on its list of "40 Greatest Women of Country Music" in 2002. In 2009, Wynette's contributions as a songwriter allowed for her induction into the Nashville Songwriters Hall of Fame.

In 2010, the state of Mississippi designated a segment of Mississippi Highway 23 the Tammy Wynette Memorial Highway. The 17-mile (27 km) stretch of road is in Itawamba County, where Wynette was born. Also that year, the Country Music Hall of Fame opened an extended exhibit showcasing Wynette's life and career. Titled "Tammy Wynette: First Lady of Country Music", the exhibit ran from August 2010 to June 2011. In 2017, she was ranked number 16 on Rolling Stone's 100 Greatest Country Artists of All-Time list. In 2021, her recording of "Stand by Your Man" was ranked as No. 473 on Rolling Stone magazine's "500 Greatest Songs of All Time". Additionally, her recording of "D-I-V-O-R-C-E" placed at number 69 on Rolling Stones 2014 list of the "100 Greatest Country Songs of All Time".

Stand By Your Man plays on the soundtrack of the 1993 romantic movie Sleepless in Seattle. Tammy Wynette is posthumously mentioned by Zuri on the sitcom Jessie in the season two episode G.I. Jessie, being called "the late, great country legend Tammy Wynette".

== Discography ==
Studio albums

- Your Good Girl's Gonna Go Bad (1967)
- My Elusive Dreams (with David Houston) (1967)
- Take Me to Your World / I Don't Wanna Play House (1968)
- D-I-V-O-R-C-E (1968)
- Stand by Your Man (1969)
- Inspiration (1969)
- The Ways to Love a Man (1970)
- The World of Tammy Wynette (1970)
- Tammy's Touch (1970)
- The First Lady (1970)
- Christmas with Tammy (1970)
- We Sure Can Love Each Other (1971)
- Bedtime Story (1972)
- My Man (1972)
- Another Lonely Song (1974)
- Woman to Woman (1974)
- I Still Believe in Fairy Tales (1975)
- 'Til I Can Make It on My Own (1976)
- You and Me (1976)
- Let's Get Together (1977)
- One of a Kind (1977)
- Womanhood (1978)
- Just Tammy (1979)
- Only Lonely Sometimes (1980)
- You Brought Me Back (1981)
- Soft Touch (1982)
- Good Love & Heartbreak (1982)
- Even the Strong Get Lonely (1983)
- Sometimes When We Touch (1985)
- Higher Ground (1987)
- Next to You (1989)
- Heart Over Mind (1990)
- Honky Tonk Angels (with Dolly Parton and Loretta Lynn) (1993)
- Without Walls (1994)

Studio albums with George Jones

- We Go Together (1971)
- Me and the First Lady (1972)
- We Love to Sing About Jesus (1972)
- Let's Build a World Together (1973)
- We're Gonna Hold On (1973)
- George & Tammy & Tina (1975)
- Golden Ring (1976)
- Together Again (1980)
- One (1995)

== Filmography ==
List of film and TV appearances by Tammy Wynette, showing all relevant details
Title	Year	Role	Notes	Ref.
Nashville 99	1977	Herself	Cameo appearance	
Capitol	1986–1987	Darlene Stankowski		
Stand by Your Dream	1987	Herself	Documentary	
Evening Shade	1994	Jolene Eldridge		
Married... with Children	1996	Herself	Cameo appearance	
King of the Hill	1997–1998	Tilly Hill (voice)	Final role	

== Books ==
- With Dew, Joan (1979). Stand by Your Man. New York: Simon & Schuster. ISBN 978-0-671-22884-2 – via the Internet Archive.
- The Tammy Wynette Southern Cookbook. Elmwood, La.: Pelican Publishing Company. 1990. ISBN 978-0-88289-734-9.
