= Tammy's Greatest Hits =

Compilation album by Tammy Wynette
- Released: 1969
- Genre: Country
- Length: 29:22
- Label: Epic Records
- Producer: Billy Sherrill

Professional ratings
Review scores
| Source | Rating |
|---|---|
| Allmusic | 5/5 stars |

Tammy's Greatest Hits is a compilation album by American country music singer-songwriter Tammy Wynette. It was released on August 11, 1969, by Epic Records. The album was certified platinum in 1989 by the RIAA.

== Track listing ==
| No. | Title | Album | Length |
|---|---|---|---|
| 1. | "Stand by Your Man" | Stand by Your Man, 1969 | 2:38 |
| 2. | "Singing My Song" | Previously unreleased | 2:20 |
| 3. | "Take Me to Your World" | Take Me to Your World / I Don't Wanna Play House, 1967 | 2:47 |
| 4. | "Apartment #9" (album version) | Your Good Girl's Gonna Go Bad, 1967 | 2:54 |
| 5. | "D-I-V-O-R-C-E" | D-I-V-O-R-C-E, 1968 | 2:54 |
| 6. | "I Don't Wanna Play House" | Take Me to Your World / I Don't Wanna Play House, 1967 | 2:34 |
| 7. | "Your Good Girl's Gonna Go Bad" | Your Good Girl's Gonna Go Bad, 1967 | 2:01 |
| 8. | "Run, Angel, Run" | Run, Angel, Run! (soundtrack) | 2:29 |
| 9. | "Too Far Gone" | Previously unreleased | 2:50 |
| 10. | "Almost Persuaded" | Your Good Girl's Gonna Go Bad, 1967 | 2:56 |
| 11. | "My Elusive Dreams" | My Elusive Dreams | 2:50 |

== Certifications ==
| Region | Certification | Certified units/sales |
|---|---|---|
| Canada (Music Canada) | Platinum | 100,000^{^} |
| United States (RIAA) | Platinum | 1,000,000^{^} |
^{^} Shipments figures based on certification alone.
