= We Sure Can Love Each Other (album) =

Studio album by Tammy Wynette
- Released: May 3, 1971
- Recorded: February 1970 – February 1971
- Studios: Columbia Studio B (Nashville, Tennessee)
- Genres: Country; country pop
- Label: Epic
- Producer: Billy Sherrill

Tammy Wynette chronology
Christmas with Tammy (1970)	We Sure Can Love Each Other (1971)	Tammy's Greatest Hits, Volume II (1971)

Singles from We Sure Can Love Each Other
- 1. "We Sure Can Love Each Other" Released: February 1971

We Sure Can Love Each Other is a studio album by American country artist, Tammy Wynette. It was released on May 3, 1971, via Epic Records and was the eleventh studio album released in her career. The disc contained a total of 11 tracks, mixing new material with cover tunes. The title track was the only singles included and became a chart-topping country song in North America. The album itself also charted in the top ten of the American country albums chart and received positive reviews by critics.

== Background, recording and content ==
Tammy Wynette had become among country music's most popular artists during the sixties and seventies. She had a string of chart-topping and top ten country songs, including her signature recording of "Stand by Your Man" (1969). Between 1971 and 1973 alone, Wynette had five number one singles on the country charts. Among these recordings was 1971's "We Sure Can Love Each Other". Co-written by Wynette, she was inspired to write the track after hearing Johnny Cash say "we sure can hurt each other" on a talk show. Wynette's eleventh studio album was named for the single. Material for the project was recorded between February 1970 and February 1971. Sessions were held at Columbia Studio B (the "Quonset hut studio"), located in Nashville, Tennessee. The project was produced by Billy Sherrill.

We Sure Can Love Each Other consisted of 11 tracks. Several cover tunes were included on the album. The track "If You I Love You Now (I've Just Started)" was first a top 20 country single by Jody Miller in 1970. "Bring Him Safely Home to Me" was recorded around the same time by Sandy Posey, whose version was a top 20 country single in 1971. Another recording, "Have a Little Faith", was a chart-topping country song for David Houston in 1968. Remaining tracks were new material such as "He Knows All the Ways to Love", "Make Me Your Kind of Woman" and "Don't Liberate Me (Love Me)". The latter recording was considered a protest song against the Equal Rights Amendment in the United States. Its lyrics describe how a housewife enjoys being a homemaker and wants to "remain a woman".

== Release, chart performance, singles and reception ==
Professional ratings
Review scores
Source	Rating
Allmusic	3/5 stars

We Sure Can Love Each Other was originally released on May 3, 1971, on Epic Records. It was originally distributed as a vinyl LP and a cassette. Five tracks were included on the first side while six tracks were included on the second side. Decades later it was reissued digitally by Sony Music Entertainment during the 2010s, however a specific date is not known. Following its initial release, the album received a positive review by Billboard in May 1971. Critics found it to include "some of her best performances", while concluding, "Heart and soul performances, a top chart item." Years later, it was given three out of stars by AllMusic. The disc peaked at number eight on the American Billboard Top Country Albums chart in July 1971. It also reached number 115 on the Billboard 200 and charted at number 11 on the Canadian RPM Top Tape Sellers chart. It was Wynette's only chart entry on the Tape Sellers list. The title track was the only single included. It was originally released by Epic in February 1971. By April 1971, the song reached number two on the Billboard Hot Country Songs chart while also topping the RPM Country Tracks chart.

== Track listing ==
Side one
No.	Title	Writer(s)	Length
1.	"We Sure Can Love Each Other"	Billy Sherrill; Tammy Wynette	2:43
2.	"The Joys of Being a Woman"	Dan Hoffman; Chuck Woolery	2:35
3.	"He Knows All the Ways to Love"	Carmol Taylor	2:14
4.	"Make Me Your Kind of Woman"	Emily Mitchell; Norro Wilson	2:35
5.	"Don't Liberate Me (Love Me)"	Van Givens; Clyde Pitts; J. Lan Pitts	2:30

Side two
No.	Title	Writer(s)	Length
1.	"Bring Him Safely Home to Me"	Sherrill; Larry Butler	2:23
2.	"The Only Thing"	Raymond E. Page; Mary Popplewell	2:30
3.	"Longing to Hold You Again"	Don Robertson	2:14
4.	"Have a Little Faith"	Sherrill; Glenn Sutton	2:12
5.	"If You Think I Love You Now (I've Just Started)"	Sherrill; Curly Putman	2:47
6.	"Baby, Come Home"	Forest Borders	2:55

== Personnel ==
All credits are adapted from the liner notes of We Sure Can Love Each Other.

- Al Clayton – photography
- The Jordanaires – backing vocals
- Billy Sherrill – producer
- Tammy Wynette – lead vocals

== Charts ==
Chart (1971)	Peak position
Canada Top Tape Sellers (RPM)	11
US Billboard 200	115
US Top Country Albums (Billboard)	8

== Release history ==
Region	Date	Format	Label	Ref.
Australia	May 3, 1971	Vinyl	Epic Records	
Europe	May 3, 1971	Vinyl	Epic Records	
Japan	May 3, 1971	Vinyl	Epic Records	
North America	May 3, 1971	Vinyl; cassette	Epic Records	
North America	2010s	Music download; streaming	Sony Music Entertainment	
