= George Jones and Tammy Wynette discography =

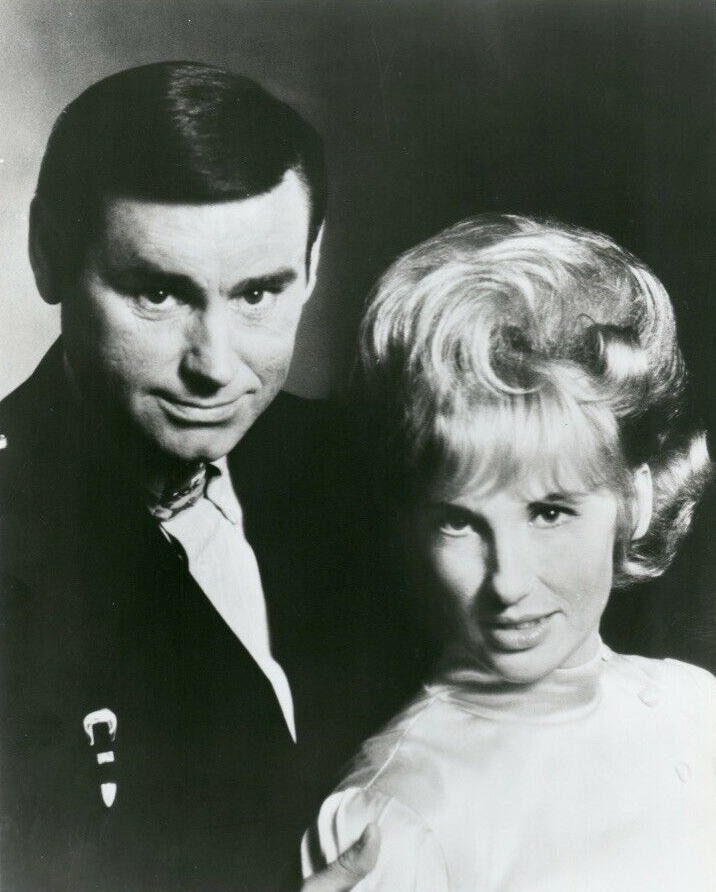
- Promotional image of George Jones and Tammy Wynette in 1969.
- Studio albums: 9
- Compilation albums: 14
- Singles: 15
- Music videos: 1

The discography of American country artists George Jones and Tammy Wynette contains the recordings they made as a vocal duo. Their discography includes nine studio albums, 14 compilation albums, 15 singles and one music video. In October 1971, the duo's first studio album was released by Epic Records and was titled We Go Together. It peaked at number three on the American Billboard Top Country Albums chart and number 169 on the Billboard 200 list. Included on the disc was the duo's first single, "Take Me". It reached the top ten on the American Billboard Hot Country Songs chart and the top 20 on the Canadian RPM Country Tracks chart. It was followed by their second studio album called Me and the First Lady, which charted at number six on the Billboard country list. Featured on the disc was their second top ten single, "The Ceremony".

Jones and Wynette's third studio recording was a gospel disc titled We Love to Sing About Jesus (1972), which featured the top 40 single, "Old Fashioned Singing". In 1973, Epic issued two studio albums of the duo's material: Let's Build a World Together and We're Gonna Hold On. The latter disc's title track was the pair's first number one single on the Billboard country chart. Between 1974 and 1975, three singles were issued by the Jones-Wynette duo. Of the three, its most successful was 1974's "We Loved It Away". It peaked in the Billboard country top ten and was included on their sixth studio album, George & Tammy & Tina. The latter included Wynette's daughter, Tina. In 1976, Epic issued the pair's seventh studio disc titled Golden Ring. It was their only album to top the Billboard country albums chart. The disc included the number one Billboard singles: "Golden Ring" and "Near You". Both singles also charted on the RPM country chart, with "Near You", topping the chart.

Jones and Wynette reunited sporadically over the next two decades to record and perform. In 1977, the new single, "Southern California", was included on their Greatest Hits album. The single itself reached number five on the Billboard country chart. In 1980, the duo returned for the recording of their eighth studio album, Together Again. Included on the disc was the single, "Two Story House". The track was a number two Billboard country hit and a number one RPM country hit. Jones and Wynette recorded for the final time in 1995 and released the album, One. The disc peaked at number 12 on the Billboard country chart while also being their first to chart on the RPM Country Albums list. It included the chart single, "One", which also featured a corresponding music video.

== Albums ==
=== Studio albums ===
List of albums, with selected chart positions, showing other relevant details
Title	Album details	Peak chart positions		
Title	Album details	US	US Cou.	CAN Cou.
We Go Together	Released: October 18, 1971; Label: Epic; Formats: LP	—	—	—
Me and the First Lady	Released: August 8, 1972; Label: Epic; Formats: LP	—	6	—
We Love to Sing About Jesus	Released: November 6, 1972; Label: Epic; Formats: LP	—	—	—
Let's Build a World Together	Released: February 5, 1973; Label: Epic; Formats: LP	—	12	—
We're Gonna Hold On	Released: November 19, 1973; Label: Epic; Formats: LP	—	3	—
George & Tammy & Tina (with Tina Byrd)	Released: February 10, 1975; Label: Epic; Formats: LP	—	37	—
Golden Ring	Released: August 9, 1976; Label: Epic; Formats: LP	—	1	—
Together Again	Released: September 22, 1980; Label: Epic; Formats: LP	—	26	—
One	Released: June 20, 1995; Label: MCA; Formats: Cassette, CD	117	12	33
"—" denotes a recording that did not chart or was not released in that territory.

=== Compilation albums ===
List of albums, with selected chart positions and certifications, showing other relevant details
Title	Album details	Peak chart positions	Certifications
Title	Album details	US Country	Certifications
Greatest Hits	Released: November 7, 1977; Label: Epic; Formats: LP	23	RIAA: Gold
George & Tammy	Released: 1977; Label: Columbia; Formats: LP	—	
Encore	Released: June 15, 1981; Label: Epic; Formats: LP, cassette	—	
The President and the First Lady	Released: 1982; Label: Columbia/TeeVee; Formats: LP, cassette	—	
Greatest Hits, Vol. 2	Released: January 28, 1992; Label: Epic; Formats: Cassette, CD	—	
George and Tammy Super Hits	Released: May 2, 1995; Label: Epic; Formats: Cassette, CD	—	
The Best of George Jones & Tammy Wynette	Released: 1995; Label: Heartland/MCA; Formats: Cassette, CD	—	
Together Again: The Encore Collection	Released: April 13, 1999; Label: BMG; Formats: Cassette, CD	—	
16 Biggest Hits	Released: August 10, 1999; Label: Epic/Legacy; Formats: Cassette, CD	—	
It Sure Was Good	Released: January 1, 2001; Label: Sony; Formats: Cassette, CD	—	
Love Songs	Released: January 9, 2004; Label: Epic; Formats: CD	—	
George & Tammy: Duets	Released: 2004; Label: Sony/Time Life; Formats: CD	—	
Playlist: The Very Best of George Jones & Tammy Wynette	Released: October 9, 2012; Label: Epic/Sony Music; Formats: CD	—	
The Classic Christmas Album	Released: 2013; Label: Epic/Legacy; Formats: CD	72	
"—" denotes a recording that did not chart or was not released in that territory.

== Singles ==
List of singles, with selected chart positions, showing other relevant details
Title	Year	Peak chart positions		Album
Title	Year	US Cou.	CAN Cou.	Album
"Take Me"	1971	9	12	We Go Together
"The Ceremony"	1972	6	3	Me and the First Lady
"Old Fashioned Singing"	1972	38	—	We Love to Sing About Jesus
"Let's Build a World Together"	1973	32	—	Let's Build a World Together
"We're Gonna Hold On"	1973	1	2	We're Gonna Hold On
"Mr. and Mrs. Santa Claus"	1973	—	—	—N/a
"(We're Not) The Jet Set"	1974	15	16	We're Gonna Hold On
"We Loved It Away"	1974	8	—	George & Tammy & Tina
"God's Gonna Get'cha (For That)"	1975	25	—	George & Tammy & Tina
"Golden Ring"	1976	1	5	Golden Ring
"Near You"	1976	1	1	Golden Ring
"Southern California"	1977	5	17	Greatest Hits
"Two Story House"	1980	2	1	Together Again
"A Pair of Old Sneakers"	1980	19	59	Together Again
"One"	1995	69	88	One
"—" denotes a recording that did not chart or was not released in that territory.

== Music videos ==
List of music videos, showing year released and director
Title	Year	Director(s)	Ref.
"One"	1995	Marc Ball	

== See also ==
- George Jones albums discography
- George Jones singles discography
- Tammy Wynette albums discography
- Tammy Wynette singles discography
