= List of awards and nominations received by Tammy Wynette =

Tammy Wynette awards and nominations
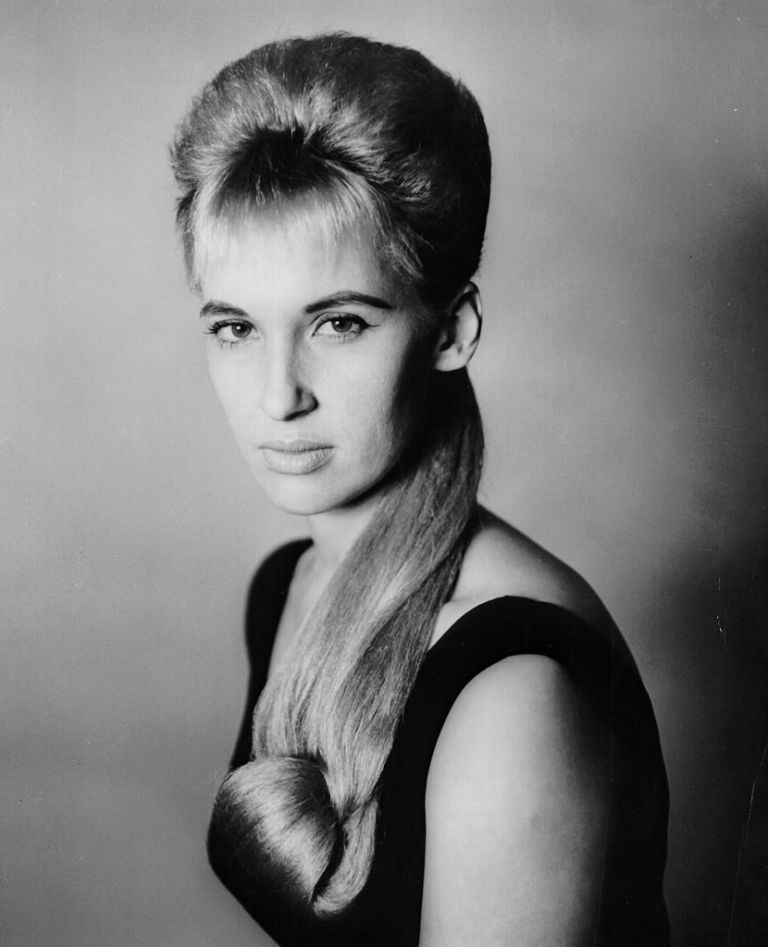
- Wynette in 1970
Awards and nominations
Award	Wins	Nominations
Academy of Country Music	2	6
Country Music Association	3	22
Grammy Awards	3	12

Totals (Note: Certain award groups do not simply award one winner. They acknowledge several different recipients, have runners-up, and have third place. Since this is a specific recognition and is different from losing an award, runner-up mentions are considered wins in this award tally. For simplification and to avoid errors, each award in this list has been presumed to have had a prior nomination.)
- Wins: 43
- Nominations: 43

American country music artist, Tammy Wynette, has received various awards, honors and nominations for her work. This includes two accolades from the Academy of Country Music and two awards from Record World Magazine. She also received three back-to-back accolades from the Country Music Association for Top Female Vocalist. The association also nominated her 22 more times for her work. Wynette has also been given two Grammy awards for Best Female Country Vocal Performance. The Grammy's also nominated Wynette 12 additional times. Posthumously, her song "Stand by Your Man" was inducted into the Grammy Hall of Fame. Wynette has also been inducted into the Alabama Music Hall of Fame and the Country Music Hall of Fame.

== Academy of Country Music Awards ==
Year	Nominee / work	Award	Result	Ref.
1969	Tammy's Greatest Hits	Album of the Year	Nominated	
1969	"Stand by Your Man"	Single Record of the Year	Nominated	
1969	Tammy Wynette	Top Female Vocalist	Won	
1970	Tammy Wynette	Top Female Vocalist	Nominated	
1976	Tammy Wynette	Top Female Vocalist of the Year	Nominated	
1976	Tammy Wynette and George Jones	Top Vocal Duo	Nominated	
1995	"One"	Top Vocal Duet	Nominated	
2001	Tammy Wynette	Cliffie Stone Pioneer Award	Won	

== Alabama Music Hall of Fame ==
Year	Nominee / work	Award	Result	Ref.
1993	Tammy Wynette	Alabama Music Hall of Fame	Won	

== American Music Awards ==
Year	Nominee / work	Award	Result	Ref.
1974	Tammy Wynette	Favorite Country Female Artist	Nominated	
1996	Tammy Wynette	American Music Award of Merit	Won	

== Billboard Music Awards ==
Year	Nominee / work	Award	Result	Ref.
1970	Tammy Wynette	Best Female Vocalist	Won	
1970	Tammy Wynette	Best Female Artist, Albums	Won	
1970	Tammy Wynette	Best Female Artist, Singles	Won	
1971	Tammy Wynette	Best Female Artist, Albums	Won	
1972	Tammy Wynette	Best Female Artist, Albums	Won	
1972	George Jones and Tammy Wynette	Best Duo, Album	Won	
1974	Tammy Wynette	Best Female Vocalist	Won	
1974	George Jones and Tammy Wynette	Best Duo, Album	Won	

== BMI Film & TV Awards ==
Year	Nominee / work	Award	Result	Ref.
1969	"Stand by Your Man"	Songwriter's Citation for Achievement	Won	
1971	"Singing My Song"	Songwriter's Citation for Achievement	Won	
1972	"We Sure Can Love Each Other"	Songwriter's Citation for Achievement	Won	
1973	"Reach Out Your Hand (And Touch Somebody)"	Songwriter's Citation for Achievement	Won	
1974	"Another Lonely Song"	Songwriter's Citation for Achievement	Won	
1976	"'Til I Can Make It on My Own"	Songwriter's Citation for Achievement	Won	
1976	"'Til I Can Make It on My Own"	Songwriter's Citation Achievement (Pop and Country)	Won	
1980	"Two Story House"	Songwriter's Citation Achievement	Won	
1986	"'Til I Can Make It on My Own"	Million-Air's Award	Won	
1989	"Stand by Your Man"	Million-Air's Award	Won	

== British Country Music Awards ==
Year	Nominee / work	Award	Result	Ref.
1976	Tammy Wynette	Number One Female Vocalist of the Year	Won	

== Cashbox Awards ==
Year	Nominee / work	Award	Result	Ref.
1968	Tammy Wynette	Most Programmed Female Artist	Won	
1972	George Jones and Tammy Wynette	Top Vocal Duo	Won	
1974	George Jones and Tammy Wynette	Top Vocal Duo	Won	

== Country Music Association Awards ==
Year	Nominee / work	Award	Result	Ref.
1967	Tammy Wynette	Female Vocalist of the Year	Nominated	
1967	Tammy Wynette and David Houston	Vocal Group of the Year	Nominated	
1968	D-I-V-O-R-C-E	Album of the Year	Nominated	
1968	Tammy Wynette	Female Vocalist of the Year	Won	
1968	"D-I-V-O-R-C-E"	Single of the Year	Nominated	
1969	Stand by Your Man	Album of the Year	Nominated	
1969	Tammy Wynette	Female Vocalist of the Year	Won	
1969	"Stand by Your Man"	Song of the Year	Nominated	
1970	Tammy Wynette	Female Vocalist of the Year	Won	
1971	Tammy Wynette	Female Vocalist of the Year	Nominated	
1971	Tammy Wynette and George Jones	Vocal Duo of the Year	Nominated	
1972	Tammy Wynette	Female Vocalist of the Year	Nominated	
1972	Tammy Wynette and George Jones	Vocal Duo of the Year	Nominated	
1973	Tammy Wynette	Female Vocalist of the Year	Nominated	
1973	Tammy Wynette and George Jones	Vocal Duo of the Year	Nominated	
1974	Tammy Wynette and George Jones	Vocal Duo of the Year	Nominated	
1975	Tammy Wynette and George Jones	Vocal Duo of the Year	Nominated	
1976	Tammy Wynette	Female Vocalist of the Year	Nominated	
1976	"'Til I Can Make It on My Own"	Song of the Year (with George Richey and Billy Sherrill)	Nominated	
1976	Tammy Wynette and George Jones	Vocal Duo of the Year	Nominated	
1977	Tammy Wynette and George Jones	Vocal Duo of the Year	Nominated	
1980	Tammy Wynette and George Jones	Vocal Duo of the Year	Nominated	
1981	Tammy Wynette and George Jones	Vocal Duo of the Year	Nominated	
1992	Tammy Wynette and Randy Travis	Vocal Event of the Year	Nominated	
1994	Tammy Wynette, Loretta Lynn and Dolly Parton	Vocal Event of the Year	Nominated	

== Country Music Hall of Fame and Museum ==
Year	Nominee / work	Award	Result	Ref.
1998	Tammy Wynette	Country Music Hall of Fame and Museum	Won	

== Country Song Roundup Magazine ==
Year	Nominee / work	Award	Result	Ref.
1967	Tammy Wynette	Most Promising Female Artist of the Year	Won	

== Grammy Awards ==
Year	Nominee / work	Award	Result	Ref.
1968	"I Don't Wanna Play House"	Best Country & Western Solo Vocal Performance, Female	Won	
1969	"D-I-V-O-R-C-E"	Best Country Vocal Performance, Female	Nominated	
1970	"Stand by Your Man"	Best Country Vocal Performance, Female	Won	
1971	"Run, Woman, Run"	Best Country Vocal Performance, Female	Nominated	
1972	"Good Lovin' (Makes It Right)"	Best Country Vocal Performance, Female	Nominated	
1973	"Take Me"	Best Country Vocal Performance By A Duo Or Group (with George Jones)	Nominated	
1973	"My Man (Understands)"	Best Country Vocal Performance, Female	Nominated	
1974	"We're Gonna Hold On"	Best Country Vocal Performance By A Duo Or Group (with George Jones)	Nominated	
1974	"Kids Say the Darndest Things"	Best Country Vocal Performance, Female	Nominated	
1975	"Woman to Woman"	Best Country Vocal Performance, Female	Nominated	
1977	"Golden Ring"	Best Country Vocal Performance By A Duo Or Group (with George Jones)	Nominated	
1977	"'Til I Can Make It on My Own"	Best Country Vocal Performance, Female	Nominated	
1978	"Near You"	Best Country Vocal Performance By A Duo Or Group (with George Jones)	Nominated	
1994	"Silver Threads and Golden Needles"	Best Country Vocal Collaboration (with Loretta Lynn and Dolly Parton)	Nominated	
1999	"Stand by Your Man"	Grammy Hall of Fame	Won	

== Music City News Awards ==
Year	Nominee / work	Award	Result	Ref.
1967	Tammy Wynette	Most Promising Female Artist of the Year	Won	
1970	Tammy Wynette	Female Artist of the Year	Won	
1980	"Two Story House"	Country Hit of the Year (with George Jones)	Won	
1991	Tammy Wynette	Living Legend Award	Won	

== Nashville Songwriters Hall of Fame ==
Year	Nominee / work	Award	Result	Ref.
2009	Tammy Wynette	Nashville Songwriters Hall of Fame	Won	

== National Association of Recording Merchandisers ==
Year	Nominee / work	Award	Result	Ref.
1968	Tammy Wynette	Best-Selling Female Artist	Won	
1969	Tammy Wynette	Best-Selling Female Artist	Won	
1972	Tammy Wynette	Best-Selling Female Artist	Nominated	

== Record World Awards ==
Year	Nominee / work	Award	Result	Ref.
1967	Tammy Wynette	Most Promising Female Artist of the Year	Won	
1970	Tammy Wynette	Top Female Artist (tied with Loretta Lynn)	Won	
