= Greatest Hits (George Jones and Tammy Wynette album) =

Compilation album by George Jones and Tammy Wynette
- Released: November 7, 1977
- Genre: Country
- Label: Epic
- Producer: Billy Sherrill

George Jones and Tammy Wynette chronology
Golden Ring (1976)	Greatest Hits (1977)	Together Again (1980)

Singles from Greatest Hits
- 1. "Southern California" Released: June 27, 1977

Professional ratings
Review scores
Source	Rating
Christgau's Record Guide	A−

Greatest Hits is an album by country music artists George Jones and Tammy Wynette. It was the first compilation by Epic Records that collected some of their biggest hits, including the number-one singles "We're Gonna Hold On", "Golden Ring", and "Near You". It is also significant for containing the new song "Southern California", which rose to number five in 1977. Although Jones and Wynette had divorced in 1975, they remained a valuable commercial commodity for Epic, scoring their biggest chart hits after their split. The album peaked at number 23 on the Billboard country albums chart and eventually went Gold in the U.S.

== Track listing ==
1. "Golden Ring" (Bobby Braddock/Rafe Van Hoy)
2. "We're Gonna Hold On" (George Jones/Earl Montgomery)
3. "We Loved It Away" (George Richey/Carmol Taylor)
4. "Take Me" (Jones/Leon Payne)
5. "Near You" (Francis Craig/Rob Goellner/Kermit Goell)
6. "Southern California" (Richey/Sherrill/Roger Bowling)
7. "God's Gonna Getcha (For That)" (Eddie Collins)
8. "(We're Not) The Jet Set" (Braddock)
9. "Let's Build a World Together" (Richey/Sherril/Norrow Wilson)
10. "The Ceremony" (Sherrill/Taylor/Jenny Strickland)
