= George and Tammy Super Hits =

Greatest hits album by George Jones and Tammy Wynette
- Released: May 2, 1995
- Genre: Country
- Length: 28:27
- Label: Epic

George Jones chronology
The Bradley Barn Sessions (1994)	George and Tammy Super Hits (1995)	One (1995)

Tammy Wynette chronology
Without Walls (1994) (1994)	George and Tammy Super Hits (1995) (1995)	One (1995) (1995)

Professional ratings
Review scores
Source	Rating
Allmusic	3/5 stars

George and Tammy Super Hits is an album by American country music artists George Jones and Tammy Wynette released on May 2, 1995, on the Epic Records.

== Track listing ==
No.	Title	Writer(s)	Length
1.	"Golden Ring"	Bobby Braddock, Rafe Van Hoy	3:03
2.	"We're Gonna Hold On"	George Jones, Earl Montgomery	2:59
3.	"When I Stop Dreaming"	Charlie Louvin, Ira Louvin	3:17
4.	"We Go Together"	Sammy Lyons, Danny Walls, Norro Wilson	2:31
5.	"Southern California"	Roger Bowling, George Richey, Billy Sherrill	2:53
6.	"(We're Not) The Jet Set"	Braddock	2:27
7.	"Two Story House"	David Lindsay, Glenn Tubb, Tammy Wynette	2:42
8.	"Something to Brag About"	Braddock	2:15
9.	"My Elusive Dreams"	Curly Putman, Sherrill	3:37
10.	"The Ceremony"	Sherrill, Jenny Strickland, Carmol Taylor	3:04
