= God's Gonna Get'cha (For That) =

"God's Gonna Get'cha for That"

Single by George Jones and Tammy Wynette

from the album George & Tammy & Tina
- B-side: "Those Were the Good Times"
- Released: June 1975 (U.S.)
- Recorded: 1974
- Genre: Country
- Length: 2:38
- Label: Epic 50235
- Songwriter: E. E. Collins
- Producer: Billy Sherrill

George Jones and Tammy Wynette singles chronology
"We Loved It Away" (1974)	"God's Gonna Get'cha for That" (1975)	"Golden Ring" (1976)

"God's Gonna Get'cha for That" is a song by country music singers George Jones and Tammy Wynette. Released in the spring of 1975, the song was the second of two chart singles from their 1974 duet album George & Tammy & Tina.

The song reached number 25 on the U.S. Hot Country Singles chart. It asserts that the Christian God is aware of, and will inevitably judge, the sins of all people, particularly hypocrisy and hidden sins among professed people of faith including ministers.

== Charts ==
Chart (1975)	Peak position
U.S. Billboard Hot Country Singles	25
