= Southern California (song) =

Single by George Jones & Tammy Wynette

from the album Greatest Hits
- B-side: "Keep the Change"
- Released: June 27, 1977
- Genre: Country
- Length: 2:54
- Label: Epic
- Songwriters: George Richey, Billy Sherrill, Roger Bowling
- Producer: Billy Sherrill

George Jones & Tammy Wynette singles chronology
"Near You" (1977)	"Southern California" (1977)	"Two Story House" (1980)

"Southern California" is a song written by George Richey, Billy Sherrill and Roger Bowling, recorded by American country music artists George Jones and Tammy Wynette. It was released in June 1977 as the first single from their Greatest Hits. The reached number five on the Billboard country chart.

== Background ==
Although George Jones and Tammy Wynette divorced in 1975, they enjoyed their biggest commercial successes together in the two years that followed. In 1976, Epic released the duets, "Golden Ring" and "Near You", which both became number-one hits. The couple were forced to make appearances together because the demand for concert bookings with either Tammy or George fell off drastically after they split, with an often ill Tammy finding herself strangely uncomfortable in front of disappointed and often angry audience members, a few of whom never failed to holler and scream, even in the middle of one of her songs: 'Where's George!?'" Despite the acrimony between them, Jones and Wynette were compelled to record and even perform together, leaving fans wondering if they might reconcile.

== Charts ==
Chart (1977)	Peak position
US Billboard Hot Country Singles	5
Canadian RPM Country Tracks	17
