= Kids Say the Darndest Things (album) =

Compilation album by Tammy Wynette
- Released: April 23, 1973
- Recorded: 1968 – 1973
- Genre: Country
- Label: Epic
- Producer: Billy Sherrill

Tammy Wynette chronology
Let's Build a World Together (1973)	Kids Say the Darndest Things (1973)	We're Gonna Hold On (1973)

Singles from Kids Say the Darndest Things
- 1. "Kids Say the Darndest Things" Released: March 1973

Kids Say the Darndest Things is a compilation album by American country artist, Tammy Wynette. It was released on April 23, 1973, via Epic Records and contained 11 tracks. The disc was a concept album centering around children and domestic life. The title track was the lead single from the album and topped the country charts in 1973. The album itself also made the American country albums chart. It received positive reviews from critics.

== Background ==
Tammy Wynette was among the country genre's most successful recording artists during the sixties and seventies. She had a string of number one and top ten country singles, including her signature "Stand by Your Man". She also collaborated with then-husband, George Jones, on a series of albums and singles. During this period, Epic Records often released two or three albums of Wynette's music per year. However, most of the projects were not centered around a particular theme. One of the exceptions was 1973's Kids Say the Darndest Things. Considered a concept album, the project was meant to center on children and the affects marriages have on their children. The album's concept was crafted by its producer, Billy Sherrill. Sherrill had to receive permission from Art Linkletter to title the album. This was because Linkletter had a popular book of the same name.

== Recording and content ==
Kids Say the Darndest Things consisted of 11 tracks. Because most of the tracks were previously released, it is considered a compilation album. Compiled were a series of recordings from Wynette's career that centered around themes about children. Specifically, some songs focused on the way marriages affect children. Among the previously released songs were the tracks "D-I-V-O-R-C-E" and "I Don't Wanna Play House". Both songs were originally chart-topping country singles in the United States between 1967 and 1968. Other songs were album cuts collected from Wynette's previous studio discs. "Joey" and "Don't Make Me Go to School" were first included on the 1969 Stand by Your Man LP. "I Wish I Had a Mommy Like You", "My Daddy Doll" and "Buy Me a Daddy" originated from the 1970 LP, The First Lady. Three recordings were previously not released: the title track, "Too Many Daddies" and "Listen, Spot". The album collected songs recorded between 1968 and 1973.

== Release, reception, chart performance and singles ==
Professional ratings
Review scores
Source	Rating
Allmusic	3/5 stars

Kids Say the Darndest Things was released by Epic Records on April 23, 1973. It was distributed as a vinyl LP and a cassette. It received positive reviews from critics. Billboard magazine named it among its "country picks" in April 1973. "Get out the crying towels. If this doesn't bring tears, you're beyond repair. Anyone can identify with this album of songs about families and children, and there's plenty of message," the magazine commented. Dan Cooper of AllMusic rated it three out of stars in his review. "Sound funny? It is. Except 'Too Many Daddies' will still rip your heart out," Cooper concluded.

The disc peaked at the number three position on the American Billboard Top Country Albums chart in 1973. It became Wynette's sixteenth disc to chart in the top ten of country albums list. The title track was the only single issued from the project. It was released by Epic Records in March 1973. The single topped the Billboard Hot Country Songs chart in 1973, along with reaching number 72 on the Billboard Hot 100. In Canada, the title track reached the number two spot on the RPM country chart.

== Track listing ==
Side one
No.	Title	Writer(s)	Length
1.	"Bedtime Story"	Billy Sherrill; Glenn Sutton	4:15
2.	"My Daddy Doll"	Carmol Taylor; Sherrill; Tammy Wynette	2:53
3.	"I Wish I Had a Mommy Like You"	Sherrill; Danny Walls; Norro Wilson	3:33
4.	"Listen, Spot"	Gene Crysler	2:33
5.	"D-I-V-O-R-C-E"	Bobby Braddock; Curly Putman	2:55

Side two
No.	Title	Writer(s)	Length
1.	"Kids Say the Darndest Things"	Sherrill; Sutton	2:50
2.	"I Don't Wanna Play House"	Sherrill; Sutton	2:32
3.	"Too Many Daddies"	Sherrill; Putman	2:30
4.	"Joey"	Don Chapel	2:28
5.	"Buy Me a Daddy"	Taylor	2:14
6.	"Don't Make Me Go to School"	Crysler	3:30

== Technical personnel ==
All credits are adapted from the liner notes of Kids Say the Darndest Things.

- Kristy Barnes – children's artwork
- Bill Barnes – cover, design, front cover photograph
- W.E. Lawson – front and back cover photographs
- Billy Sherrill – producer

== Charts ==
Chart (1973)	Peak position
US Top Country Albums (Billboard)	3

== Release history ==
Region	Date	Format	Label	Ref.
Australia	April 23, 1973	Vinyl	Epic Records	
Malaysia	April 23, 1973	Vinyl	CBS Records International; Sony Music	
North America	April 23, 1973	Vinyl; cassette	Epic Records	
