= Bedtime story (disambiguation) =

A bedtime story is a popular form of storytelling.

Bedtime Story or Bedtime stories may also refer to:

== Film ==
- A Bedtime Story, a 1933 comedy film
- Bedtime Story (1938 film), a British drama film directed by Donovan Pedelty
- Bedtime Story (1941 film), a 1941 comedy film
- Bedtime Story (1964 film), a 1964 comedy film, with a different plot than the 1941 film
- Bedtime Stories (film), a 2008 family fantasy comedy starring Adam Sandler

== Television ==
- Bedtime Stories (1974 TV series), an BBC2 anthology series
- "Bedtime Stories" (How I Met Your Mother), an episode of the television series How I Met Your Mother
- "Bedtime Stories" (Supernatural), an episode of the television series Supernatural
- "Bedtime Story" (Charlie Jade), an episode of the television series Charlie Jade
- "Bedtime Story" (Golden Girls episode), a 1987 episode of the television series Golden Girls
- Shelley Duvall's Bedtime Stories (1992–1994), a series on Showtime
- Tim & Eric's Bedtime Stories (2013–2017), a TV anthology series

== Music ==
=== Albums ===
- Bedtime Stories (album), a 1994 album by Madonna
  - Bedtime Stories: The Untold Chapter, a 2025 EP by Madonna
- Bedtime Stories (David Baerwald album), 1990
- Jay Chou's Bedtime Stories, a 2016 album by Jay Chou, featuring the song "Bedtime Stories"
- Bedtime Stories, a 1975 album by Judge Dread
- Bedtime Story (album), a 1972 album by Tammy Wynette

=== Songs ===
- "Bedtime Story" (Madonna song), 1994
- "Bedtime Story" (Tammy Wynette song), 1972
- "Bedtime Story" (Warm Guns song), 1983

== Other uses ==
- Bedtime Stories, a series of children's storybooks by Arthur S. Maxwell
- "Bedtime Stories", a newspaper column by American author Thornton W. Burgess
- Bed/Time/Story, a 1974 memoir about drug addiction by Jill Schary Robinson
