= I'll Follow You =

I'll Follow You or I Will Follow You may refer to:

== Albums ==
- I'll Follow You, by Oakley Hall, 2007

== Songs ==
- "I'll Follow You", written by Fred Ahlert and Roy Turk, 1932
- "I'll Follow You", by Jim Reeves, 1955
- "I'll Follow You", by Martha and the Vandellas from Watchout!, 1966
- "I'll Follow You (Up to Our Cloud), by George Jones, 1971
- "I'll Follow You", by REO Speedwagon from Good Trouble, 1982
- "I Will Follow You", by Night Ranger from 7 Wishes, 1985
- "I Will Follow You", by Modern Talking from Back for Good, 1998
- "I Will Follow You", by Schiller, 2010
- "I'll Follow You" (Shinedown song), 2013
- "I Will Follow You", by Blue October from This Is What I Live For, 2020

== See also ==
- ”I Will Follow Him”, Little Peggy March, 1963
