= Midnight Oil (disambiguation) =

Midnight Oil are an Australian rock band, formed in 1972.

Midnight Oil may also refer to:

- Midnight Oil (Midnight Oil album), the band's 1978 eponymous debut album
- Midnight Oil (Jerome Richardson album), 1959

== See also ==
- The Midnight Oil, a 1973 album by Barbara Mandrell
  - "The Midnight Oil" (song), a song written by Joe Allen, recorded by Barbara Mandrell
