= Bedtime Story (album) =

Studio album by Tammy Wynette
- Released: March 27, 1972
- Recorded: October 1971 – January 1972
- Studios: Columbia Studio B (Nashville, Tennessee)
- Genres: Country; Nashville Sound
- Label: Epic
- Producer: Billy Sherrill

Tammy Wynette chronology
We Go Together (1971)	Bedtime Story (1972)	Me and the First Lady (1972)

Singles from Bedtime Story
- 1. "Bedtime Story" Released: November 1971; 2. "Reach Out Your Hand" Released: April 1972

Bedtime Story is a studio album by American country artist, Tammy Wynette. It was released in March 1972 via Epic Records and contained 11 tracks. The disc featured both new recordings and cover tunes. Two singles were included: title track and "Reach Out Your Hand". Both made top positions on the North American country charts in 1972. The album itself reached the top ten of the American country albums chart following its release.

== Background, content and recording ==
Tammy Wynette was at her commercial peak by 1972. She had a string of number one and top ten singles such as "I Don't Wanna Play House", "D-I-V-O-R-C-E" and her signature "Stand by Your Man". Her success continued through the seventies with a series of more chart-topping singles. Among her chart-topping releases was the song "Bedtime Story" (penned by Billy Sherrill and Glenn Sutton). The song served as the lead single and name for Wynette's next studio project. Sessions for the project were recorded between October 1971 and January 1972 at Columbia Studio B (the "Quonset hut studio"), which was located in Nashville, Tennessee. The sessions were produced by Billy Sherrill.

Bedtime Story consisted of 11 tracks. Several of the tracks were new recordings. Two of these recordings were co-written by Wynette herself: "Reach Out Your Hand" and "Take Me Home and Love Me". Other tracks such as "That's When I Feel It", "I Got Me a Man" and "Your Love's Been a Long Time Coming" were all new recordings for the project. Additional material were cover tunes. The song, "If This Is Our Last Time", was originally top 40 country single for Brenda Lee in 1970. "Just as Soon as I Get Over Loving You" was a low-charting single for Jean Shepard in 1971. "Tonight My Baby's Coming Home" was a top ten single for Barbara Mandrell in 1971. "Love's the Answer" was a top ten single for Tanya Tucker in 1972.

== Release, reception, chart performance and singles ==
Bedtime Story was released on March 27, 1972 on Epic Records. It was the thirteenth studio album in Wynette's career. It was originally distributed as a vinyl LP and a cassette. When reviewing the compilation My Man/Bedtime Story (which compiled tracks from this album and her My Man LP), Stephen Cook of AllMusic praised the songs "I'm Gonna Keep on Loving Him" and "Tonight My Baby's Coming Home". Cook called them "top notch tracks". The album reached the number seven position on the American Billboard Top Country Albums chart in May 1972. It also reached number 133 on the Billboard 200 albums chart in 1972. Two singles were spawned from the disc. The first was the title track, which was first released by Epic in November 1971. By March 4, 1972, the song reached the number one spot on the Billboard Hot Country Songs chart. It also climbed to number 72 on the Billboard Hot 100. The second single issued was "Reach Out Your Hand", which was issued as the next single in April 1972. The track went to number two on the Billboard country chart by July 1972. Both singles also topped Canada's RPM Country Tracks chart in 1972.

== Track listing ==
Side one
No.	Title	Writer(s)	Length
1.	"Bedtime Story"	Billy Sherrill; Glenn Sutton	4:13
2.	"That's When I Feel It"	Taylor; Norro Wilson	2:25
3.	"Take Me Home and Love Me"	Taylor; Wilson; Tammy Wynette	2:14
4.	"If This Is Our Last Time"	Dallas Frazier	3:07
5.	"Tonight My Baby's Coming Home"	Sherrill; Sutton	2:07

Side two
No.	Title	Writer(s)	Length
1.	"Love's the Answer"	Emily Mitchell; Wilson	2:23
2.	"I'm Gonna Keep on Loving Him"	Taylor; Wilson	2:17
3.	"Just as Soon as I Get Over Loving You"	Ben Peters; George Richey	2:42
4.	"I Got Me a Man"	Jimmy Peppers	2:10
5.	"Your Love's Been a Long Time Coming"	Taylor; Wilson	2:05
6.	"Reach Out Your Hand"	Sherrill; Wynette	2:50

== Personnel ==
All credits are adapted from the liner notes of Bedtime Story.

- Bill Barnes – cover, design
- Charlie Bragg – engineer
- Lou Bradley – engineer
- The Jordanaires – backing vocals
- George McClelland – Cover photography
- The Nashville Edition – backing vocals
- Billy Sherrill – producer

== Charts ==
Chart (1972)	Peak position
US Billboard 200	133
US Top Country Albums (Billboard)	7

== Release history ==
Region	Date	Format	Label	Ref.
Australia	March 27, 1972	Vinyl	Epic Records	
North America	March 27, 1972	Vinyl; cassette	Epic Records	
United Kingdom	March 27, 1972	Vinyl	Epic Records	
Europe	1976	Vinyl; cassette	Embassy Records	
North America	2010s	Music download; streaming	Sony Music Entertainment	
