= We Go Together (disambiguation) =

We Go Together is the first studio album by American country music artists George Jones and Tammy Wynette 1971.

We Go Together may also refer to:

- "We Go Together", single by Jan and Dean charted #53 1960
- "We Go Together" (Grease song), song written by Warren Casey, Jim Jacobs 1971
- "We Go Together", song written by Sammy Lyons, Danny Walls, Norris Wilson from the album We Go Together, beginning "The places where we used to meet we go together"
