= Holdin' On (To the Love I Got) =

Single by Barbara Mandrell

from the album The Midnight Oil
- B-side: "Smile, Somebody Loves You"
- Released: September 25, 1972
- Recorded: August 31, 1972
- Studio: Columbia Studio B (Nashville, Tennessee)
- Genre: Countrypolitan; soul
- Length: 2:05
- Label: Columbia
- Songwriters: Billy Sherrill; Carmol Taylor; Tammy Wynette
- Producer: Billy Sherrill

Barbara Mandrell singles chronology
"Show Me" (1972)	"Holdin' On (To the Love I Got)" (1972)	"Give a Little, Take a Little" (1973)

"Holdin' On (To the Love I Got)" is a song written by Billy Sherrill, Carmol Taylor and Tammy Wynette. It was originally recorded by American country music artist Tammy Wynette before being recorded again by Barbara Mandrell. Mandrell's version was released in September 1972 as the third from her album The Midnight Oil. It was one of Mandrell's early single releases in her career and among her first to reach the top 40 on the American country songs chart.

== Background, recording and release ==
"Holdin' On (To the Love I Got)" was composed by Billy Sherrill, Carmol Taylor and Tammy Wynette. In May 1972, Wynette recorded her version of the song for her 1972 studio album My Man. The track was produced by Billy Sherrill. Barbara Mandrell recorded her version of the song on August 31, 1972. Sherrill also served as the song's producer.

Mandrell's version of "Holdin' On (To the Love I Got)" was released as a single on Columbia Records on September 25, 1972. It was backed on the B-side by the song "Smile, Somebody Loves You". The track was issued by the label as a seven inch vinyl single. The single spent 12 weeks on America's Billboard country songs chart, peaking at number 27 by the end of the year. In Canada, the song reached the RPM Country Singles chart, climbing to number 38 in 1972. The song was released on Mandrell's second studio LP titled The Midnight Oil. The album was released in 1973.

== Track listing ==
7" vinyl single

- "Holdin' On (To the Love I Got)" – 2:14
- "Smile, Somebody Loves You" – 2:13

== Charts ==
Chart performance for "Holdin' on (To the Love I Got)"
Chart (1972)	Peak position
Canada Country Songs (RPM)	38
US Hot Country Songs (Billboard)	27
