= A Pair of Old Sneakers =

Single by George Jones & Tammy Wynette

from the album Together Again
- B-side: "We'll Talk About It Later"
- Released: 1980
- Recorded: 1980
- Genre: Country
- Length: 2:24
- Label: Epic
- Songwriter(s): Glenn Sutton, Larry Kingston
- Producer(s): Billy Sherrill

George Jones & Tammy Wynette singles chronology
"Two Story House" (1980)	"A Pair of Old Sneakers" (1980)	"One" (1995)

"A Pair of Old Sneakers" is a song recorded by country music artists George Jones and Tammy Wynette. It was released in 1980 as the second single from their album Together Again, but it was not as successful as their previous hit "Two Story House", peaking at No. 19 on the country singles chart. Written by Glenn Sutton and Larry Kingston, the song comically uses sneakers as a metaphor for two cheating lovers ("We're just a pair of old sneakers, stringin' each other along..."). After the Together Again sessions, Jones and Wynette would not record again until the 1994 Jones LP Bradley Barn Sessions and would not release another single until "One" in 1995.

== Charts ==
Chart (1980)	Peak position
US Billboard Hot Country Singles	19
Canadian RPM Country Tracks	59
