= Together Again (George Jones and Tammy Wynette album) =

1980 album by George Jones and Tammy Wynette

Studio album by George Jones and Tammy Wynette
- Released: September 22, 1980
- Recorded: January 1980
- Studio: Columbia (Nashville, Tennessee); FAME (Muscle Shoals, Alabama)
- Genre: Country, country pop, urban cowboy
- Length: 28:52
- Label: Epic
- Producer: Billy Sherrill

George Jones and Tammy Wynette chronology
Greatest Hits (1977)	Together Again (1980)	One (1995)

George Jones chronology
I Am What I Am (1980)	Together Again (1980)	Still the Same Ole Me (1981)

Tammy Wynette chronology
Only Lonely Sometimes (1980)	Together Again (1980)	You Brought Me Back (1981)

Singles from Together Again
- 1. "Two Story House" Released: February 18, 1980; 2. "A Pair of Old Sneakers" Released: August 25, 1980

Together Again is the eighth studio album by country music artists George Jones and Tammy Wynette, released in 1980 on Epic Records. It was their first album since their 1976 hit album Golden Ring; their next album would not come until 1995 with One.

== Reception ==
Professional ratings
Review scores
Source	Rating
AllMusic	2.5/5 stars

AllMusic's Stephen Thomas Erlewine retrospectively concedes that Together Again "doesn't have the spark of some of their earlier duets" but both of the singers "sound terrific...Even when the material isn't up to their talents, the duo sounds recharged, which makes Together Again a thoroughly enjoyable, if inconsistent, listen."

== Track listing ==
No.	Title	Writer(s)	Length
1.	"A Pair of Old Sneakers"	Glenn Sutton, Larry Kingston	2:23
2.	"Right in the Wrong Direction"	Jerry Taylor, Robert John Jones	3:23
3.	"I Just Started Livin' Today"	Jerry Taylor, Robert John Jones	2:59
4.	"Love in the Meantime"	Jerry Taylor, Robert John Jones	2:42
5.	"We Could"	Felice Bryant	2:41
6.	"Two Story House"	Tammy Wynette, David H. Lindsey, Douglas Glenn Tubb	2:40
7.	"If We Don't Make It"	Paul Richey	2:45
8.	"It's Not My Fault"	Bobby Braddock	3:12
9.	"We'll Talk About It Later"	Tammy Wynette	2:25
10.	"Night Spell"	Troy Seals, Eddie Setser, Mark Gray	3:42
