= The Midnight Oil =

Studio album by Barbara Mandrell
- Released: November 9, 1973
- Recorded: September 29, 1971–May 25, 1973
- Studio: Columbia (Nashville, Tennessee)
- Genre: Country
- Length: 26:41; 39:10 (2010 CD reissue & 2018 expanded edition)
- Label: Columbia
- Producer: Billy Sherrill

Barbara Mandrell chronology
A Perfect Match (1972)	The Midnight Oil (1973)	This Time I Almost Made It (1974)

Singles from The Midnight Oil
- 1. "Tonight My Baby's Coming Home" Released: November 29, 1971; 2. "Show Me" Released: March 20, 1972; 3. "Holdin' On (To the Love I Got)" Released: September 25, 1072; 4. "Give a Little, Take a Little" Released: March 26, 1973; 5. "The Midnight Oil" Released: July 23, 1973

The Midnight Oil is the second solo studio album by American country music singer Barbara Mandrell, released in 1973.

Mandrell had not released a solo studio album since 1971. It was her most successful album while under her Columbia label. This album brought Mandrell into more controversial territory, especially with the title track, "The Midnight Oil" which discussed a woman cheating on her husband. The album spawned five Top 40 Country hits, "Tonight My Baby's Coming Home" (#10), "Show Me" (#11), "Holdin' On (To the Love I Got)" (#27), "Give a Little, Take a Little" (#24), and the title track (#7). This album brought Mandrell's first pair of solo Top 10 hits on the Hot Country Singles & Tracks chart. The album consisted of 11 tracks, some of which were cover versions, including Tanya Tucker's "The Jamestown Ferry", Martha Carson's "Satisfied" and the George Jones and Tammy Wynette hit, "We're Gonna Hold On". The album peaked at #8 on the Top Country Albums chart in 1974.

== Track listing ==
Side one
No.	Title	Writer(s)	Length
1.	"The Midnight Oil"	Joe Allen	2:40
2.	"Give a Little, Take a Little"	Steve Pippin; Michael Kossler	2:39
3.	"The Jamestown Ferry"	Mack Vickery; Bobby Borchers	2:41
4.	"Show Me"	Joe Tex	2:22
5.	"In the Name of Love"	Earl Montgomery; Carmol Taylor; George Richey	2:08

Side two
No.	Title	Writer(s)	Length
1.	"Tonight My Baby's Coming Home"	Billy Sherrill; Glenn Sutton	2:05
2.	"Ain't It Good"	Freddy Weller	2:25
3.	"Satisfied"	Martha Carson	2:23
4.	"Holdin' On (To the Love I Got)"	Taylor, Norro Wilson; Tammy Wynette	2:24
5.	"Smile, Somebody Loves You"	Tony Austin	2:13
6.	"We're Gonna Hold On"	George Jones; Montgomery	2:41

2010 CD reissue and 2018 expanded edition bonus tracks
No.	Title	Writer(s)	Original album release	Length
12.	"The Ten Commandments of Love" (with David Houston)	Marshall Paul	Single A-side (1974)	2:48
13.	"This Time I Almost Made It"	Sherrill	This Time I Almost Made It (1974)	2:17
14.	"Wonder When My Baby's Comin' Home"	Kermit Goell; Arthur Kent	This Time I Almost Made It (1974)	2:08
15.	"After Closing Time" (with David Houston)	Sherrill; Wilson; Danny Walls	A Perfect Match (1972)	2:10
16.	"I Love You, I Love You" (with David Houston)	Walls; Wilson; Sammy Lyons	A Perfect Match (1972)	3:09

== Charts ==
=== Weekly charts ===
Chart (1973–1974)	Peak position
US Top Country Albums (Billboard)	8

=== Year-end charts ===
Chart (1974)	Position
US Top Country Albums (Billboard)	36

=== Singles ===
Year	Single	Chart	Position
1971	"Tonight My Baby's Coming Home"	Hot Country Singles & Tracks	#10
1972	"Show Me"	Hot Country Singles & Tracks	#11
1972	"Holdin' On (To the Love I Got)"	Hot Country Singles & Tracks	#27
1973	"Give a Little, Take a Little"	Hot Country Singles & Tracks	#24
1973	"The Midnight Oil"	Hot Country Singles & Tracks	#7
