= Everything's Gonna Be Alright =

Everything's Gonna Be Alright may refer to:

- Everything's Gonna Be Alright (film), a 2020 comedy-drama film
- Everything's Gonna Be Alright (album), a 1998 album by Deana Carter
- "Everything's Gonna Be Alright" (Naughty by Nature song), 1992
- "Everything's Gonna Be Alright" (Sweetbox song), 1997
- "Everything's Gonna Be Alright" (David Lee Murphy and Kenny Chesney song), 2018
- "Everything Gonna Be Alright", often misspelled or covered as "Everything's Gonna Be Alright", a song by "Little Walter" Jacobs from his 1959 album Hate to See You Go
- "Everything's Gonna Be Alright", a song by Tammy Wynette and George Jones from their 1972 album We Love to Sing About Jesus
- "Everything's Gonna Be Alright", a song by England Dan & John Ford Coley from their 1976 album Nights Are Forever
- "Everything's Gonna Be Alright", a 1987 song by Al Green from his album Soul Survivor
- "Everything's Gonna Be Alright", a song by Aaliyah from her 1996 album One in a Million
- "Everything's Gonna Be Alright", a song by Barry Manilow from his 2011 album 15 Minutes
- "Everything's Gonna Be Alright", a song by Enquire Iglesias from his 2010 album Euphoria
- "Everything's Gonna Be Alright", a song by Jolin Tsai from her 2000 album Don't Stop
- "Everything's Gonna Be Alright", by Shane Filan from the 2013 album You and Me

== See also ==
- "Three Little Birds", a 1977 song by Bob Marley & The Wailers which features the refrain "every little thing gonna be all right"
- “No Woman, No Cry”, another song by The Wailers that features the refrain.
