= George Jones with Love =

Studio album by George Jones
- Released: February 1971
- Genre: Country
- Length: 25:50
- Label: Musicor
- Producer: Bob Moore

George Jones chronology
Will You Visit Me on Sunday? (1970)	George Jones with Love (1971)	George Jones Sings the Great Songs of Leon Payne (1971)

Singles from George Jones with Love
- 1. "Going Life's Way" Released: May 1970; 2. "A Good Year for the Roses" Released: October 1970; 3. "I'll Follow You (Up to Our Cloud)" Released: August 1971

George Jones with Love is an album by American country music artist George Jones, released in 1971 on the Musicor Records label.

== Reception ==
Chris Woodstra of AllMusic calls the singer's vocal on the Jerry Chestnut song "one of his all-time greatest performances."

AllMusic states, "By 1970, George Jones' stay at Musicor had been marked by a glut of sloppy releases that would continually repackage and repeat material in different thematically based 'concept' albums; initially, it would seem that George Jones With Love, with its lineup of all love-based songs, would fall into this disposable category. One listens, however, shows this to be an exception to the rule."

Professional ratings
Review scores
Source	Rating
Allmusic	link

== Track listing ==
No.	Title	Writer(s)	Length
1.	"A Good Year for the Roses"	Jerry Chesnut	3:10
2.	"I'll Follow You (Up to Our Cloud)"	David Turner	2:38
3.	"Playing Possum"	Dallas Frazier	2:15
4.	"Try"	Paul Vandergriff	2:17
5.	"Going Life's Way"	Tammy Wynette	2:41
6.	"I Know"	George Jones, Tammy Wynette	2:39
7.	"Divorce or Destroy"	Don Hosea	2:43
8.	"Loving Makes You Mine"	Jack Ripley	2:36
9.	"A Day in the Life of a Fool"	Eddie Noack	2:14
10.	"Never Grow Cold (duet with Tammy Wynette)"	George Jones, Tammy Wynette	2:37

== Chart performance ==
=== Weekly charts ===
Chart (1971)	Peak position
US Top Country Albums (Billboard)	9

=== Year-end charts ===
Chart (1971)	Position
US Top Country Albums (Billboard)	35

=== Singles ===
Year	Single	Peak chart positions		
Year	Single	US Bub.	US Country	CAN Country
1970	A Good Year for the Roses	12	2	4
1971	I'll Follow You (Up to Our Cloud)	-	13	-
