= The Bradley Barn Sessions =

Studio album by George Jones
- Released: October 11, 1994
- Studio: Bradley's Barn, Mt. Juliet, Tennessee
- Genre: Country
- Label: MCA Nashville
- Producer: Brian Ahern

George Jones chronology
High-Tech Redneck (1993)	The Bradley Barn Sessions (1994)	George and Tammy Super Hits (1995)

Singles from The Bradley Barn Sessions
- 1. "A Good Year for the Roses" Released: November 1994

Professional ratings
Review scores
Source	Rating
Allmusic	link

The Bradley Barn Sessions is a duet album released in 1994 by American country music artist George Jones.

Several unreleased tracks recorded during this album's sessions were later included on Jones' 2008 duets album Burn Your Playhouse Down.

== Reception ==
Stephen Thomas Erlewine of AllMusic calls The Bradley Barn Sessions "a stilted, nearly lifeless album. The production is too clean and polished, lacking any of the grit of true honky tonk records. Furthermore, songs like "A Good Year for the Roses" suffer from the stringless, stripped-down arrangements.

== Track listing ==
No.	Title	Writer(s)	Duet partner(s)	Length
1.	"One Woman Man"	Tillman Franks, Johnny Horton	Marty Stuart	2:50
2.	"A Good Year for the Roses"	Jerry Chesnut	Alan Jackson	3:38
3.	"Why Baby Why"	George Jones, Darrell Edwards	Ricky Skaggs	2:32
4.	"Golden Ring"	Bobby Braddock, Rafe Van Hoy	Tammy Wynette	3:05
5.	"Say It's Not You"	Dallas Frazier	Keith Richards	2:59
6.	"The Love Bug"	Wayne Kemp, Curtis Wayne	Vince Gill	2:27
7.	"Where Grass Won't Grow"	Earl Montgomery	Trisha Yearwood, Emmylou Harris, Dolly Parton	3:52
8.	"The Race Is On"	Jones, Don Rollins	Travis Tritt	2:29
9.	"Bartender Blues"	James Taylor	Trisha Yearwood	3:54
10.	"White Lightnin'"	J.P. Richardson	Mark Knopfler	3:31
11.	"Good Ones and Bad Ones"	Joe Chambers, Larry Jenkins	Mark Chesnutt	3:08
Total length:				34:25

== Personnel ==
- Brian Ahern – rhythm guitar (track 1), bass (track 10), acoustic guitar (tracks 2, 5 – 7, 9, 11)
- Eddie Bayers – drums (tracks 1 – 3, 5, 7 – 10)
- Richard Bennett – acoustic guitar (tracks 1, 4, 6, and 11)
- James Burton – electric guitar (tracks 5 and 11)
- Jerry Douglas – resonator guitar (tracks 1 – 4, 8, and 9)
- Paul Franklin – steel guitar (tracks 5, 7, and 10)
- Vince Gill – guitar (tracks 4, 6, 7, and 10)
- Glen D. Hardin – piano (tracks 2, 3, 7 – 9)
- Emmylou Harris – acoustic guitar (track 5)
- Randy Howard – mandolin (track 11)
- John Hughey – steel guitar (tracks 4 and 6)
- David Hungate – bass (tracks 4, 6, and 11)
- John Jennings – electric guitar (tracks 3 and 9)
- Mark Knopfler – electric guitar (track 10)
- Mac McAnally – acoustic slide guitar (track 1), acoustic guitar (tracks 2, 3, 5, 7 – 10)
- Keith Richards – electric guitar (track 5)
- Hargus "Pig" Robbins – piano (tracks 1 and 10)
- Brent Rowan – electric guitar (tracks 2 and 8)
- Leon Russell – piano (tracks 4 – 6, 11)
- Ricky Skaggs – harmony vocals (tracks 4 and 8), fiddle (tracks 1, 2, 5 – 11), acoustic guitar (tracks 3 and 4)
- Tommy Spurlock – steel guitar (tracks 2, 3, 8, 9, and 11), resonator guitar (track 7)
- Harry Stinson – drums (tracks 4, 6, and 11)
- Marty Stuart – electric slide guitar (track 1), mandolin (tracks: 2 – 10)
- Glenn Worf – acoustic guitar (track 3), acoustic bass (tracks 1, 2, 5, 7–10)

== Special Thanks ==
- Nancy Jones
- Tony Brown
- Renee White
- Owen Bradley
- Michael Sales
- Bob Bradley
- Glen D. Hardin
- Ricky Scaggs
- Tommy Waco Spurlock
- Greg Humphrey
- Joyce Write
- Julie Ballweg
- Marsha Southerland
- Pee Wee Johnson
- John Spencer
- Scott Dorsey

Photographer Fritz Hoffman
