= My Man (album) =

Studio album by Tammy Wynette
- Released: September 25, 1972
- Recorded: May 1971 – May 1972
- Studios: Columbia Studio B (Nashville, Tennessee)
- Genres: Country; Countrypolitan
- Label: Epic
- Producer: Billy Sherrill

Tammy Wynette chronology
Me and the First Lady (1972)	My Man (1972)	We Love to Sing About Jesus (1972)

Singles from My Man
- 1. "My Man (Understands)" Released: August 1972; 2. "'Til I Get It Right" Released: December 1972

My Man is a studio album by American country artist, Tammy Wynette. It was released on September 25, 1972, via Epic Records and was the fifteenth studio album of her career. The disc was a collection of 11 tracks whose themes centered around spousal loyalty and heartache. Two singles were spawned from the album: "My Man (Understands)" and "'Til I Get It Right". Both topped the country charts in 1972 and 1973, respectively. The album itself reached the top position on the American country albums chart.

== Background, recording and content ==
Tammy Wynette was among the most successful country artist of the sixties and seventies decades. She had a series of chart-topping and top ten country singles that earned her the title of "The First Lady of Country Music". Between 1971 and 1973, she had five number one singles on the country charts including "My Man (Understands)". The song served as the lead single and name for Wynette's next studio release. The sessions for My Man were recorded between May 1971 and May 1972 at Columbia Studio B (the "Quonset hut studio"), located in Nashville, Tennessee. The sessions were produced by Billy Sherrill.

The project contained a total of 11 tracks. Most of the album's material followed themes centered around housewives staying loyal to their husbands, such as the title track, "Hold On (To the Love I Got)" and "Good Lovin' (Makes It Right)". Other selections such as "You Can't Hang On" and "'Til I Get It Right" had lyrics that described heartbreak. Four tracks on the project had writing credits from Carmol Taylor, while two had credits from Norro Wilson. Wynette herself contributed to two of the album's tracks. A cover version of "The Happiest Girl in the Whole U.S.A." by Donna Fargo also appeared. Fargo's version was a number one country single in 1972. The track, "Hold On (To the Love I Got)" was released in 1972 as a single by Barbara Mandrell whose version was a top 40 country single.

== Release, chart performance, reception and singles ==
Professional ratings
Review scores
Source	Rating
Allmusic	2/5 stars

My Man was originally released on September 25, 1972, on Epic Records. It was originally distributed as both a vinyl LP and a cassette. Decades later, it became available digitally. My Man later peaked at number two on the American Billboard Top Country Albums chart in January 1973. It peaked outside the Billboard 200, at number 201 during this period as well. My Man was given only two out of five stars from AllMusic. A compilation release (that also contained tracks from her 1972 LP Bedtime Story) was also reviewed by AllMusic. However, the recordings were given praise: "Wynette is in fine form as well, delivering heartbreak and determination in equal measure."

Two singles were spawned from the album. The first was the title track, which was originally released by Epic Records in August 1972. By November 1972, the song reached the number one spot on the Billboard Hot Country Songs chart. The album's second single was "'Til I Get It Right" and was released in December 1972. By March 1973, the single also reached the number one position on the Billboard country chart. On Canada's RPM Country Tracks chart, both singles also reached number one.

== Track listing ==
Side one
No.	Title	Writer(s)	Length
1.	"My Man"	Billy Sherrill; Carmol Taylor	2:50
2.	"Things I Love to Do"	Earl Montgomery; Tammy Wynette	2:54
3.	"Hold On (To the Love I Got)"	Taylor; Norro Wilson; Wynette	2:08
4.	"Loving You Could Never Be Better"	Montgomery	3:01
5.	"'Til I Get It Right"	Larry Henley; Red Lane	2:36

Side two
No.	Title	Writer(s)	Length
1.	"Walk Softly on the Bridges"	Dallas Frazier; Laura Lee Owens	2:58
2.	"The Bridge of Love"	Jae J. Kay	2:45
3.	"You Can't Hang On"	Taylor; Wilson	2:05
4.	"The Happiest Girl in the Whole U.S.A."	Donna Fargo	2:15
5.	"Gone with Another Man"	Taylor	2:14
6.	"Good Lovin' (Makes It Right)"	Sherrill	2:29

== Personnel ==
All credits are adapted from the liner notes of My Man.

- Bill Barnes – cover design
- Al Clayton – photography (front cover)
- The Jordanaires – backing vocals
- Slick Lawson – photography (back cover)
- The Nashville Edition – backing vocals
- Billy Sherrill – producer

== Charts ==
Chart (1972–1973)	Peak position
US Billboard 200 (Billboard)	201
US Top Country Albums (Billboard)	2

== Release history ==
Region	Date	Format	Label	Ref.
Australia	September 25, 1972	Vinyl	Epic Records	
Europe	September 25, 1972	Vinyl	Epic Records	
North America	September 25, 1972	Vinyl; cassette; reel to reel-	Epic Records	
North America	2010s	Music download; streaming	Sony Music Entertainment	
