= We Loved It Away =

Single by George Jones & Tammy Wynette

from the album George & Tammy & Tina
- B-side: "Ain't Love Been Good"
- Released: August 1974
- Genre: Country
- Length: 2:21
- Label: Epic
- Songwriters: George Richey, Carmol Taylor
- Producer: Billy Sherrill

George Jones & Tammy Wynette singles chronology
"(We're Not) the Jet Set" (1974)	"We Loved It Away" (1974)	"Golden Ring" (1975)

"We Loved It Away" is a song by George Jones and Tammy Wynette. It was composed by George Richey and Carmol Taylor.

== Chart performance ==
Chart (1974)	Peak position
U.S. Billboard Hot Country Singles	8
