= Tonight My Baby's Coming Home =

Single by Barbara Mandrell

from the album The Midnight Oil
- B-side: "He'll Never Take the Place of You"
- Released: November 29, 1971
- Recorded: September 29, 1971
- Studio: Columbia Studio B (Nashville, Tennessee)
- Genre: Countrypolitan; soul
- Length: 2:05
- Label: Columbia
- Songwriters: Billy Sherrill; Glenn Sutton
- Producer: Billy Sherrill

Barbara Mandrell singles chronology
| "Treat Him Right" (1971) | "Tonight My Baby's Coming Home" (1971) | "Show Me" (1972) |

"Tonight My Baby's Coming Home" is a song written by Billy Sherrill and Glenn Sutton, and recorded by American country music artist Barbara Mandrell. It was released in November 1971 as the first single from the album The Midnight Oil. It was one of Mandrell's early single releases in her career and among her first to reach the top ten on the American country songs chart.

== Background and recording ==
In 1969, Barbara Mandrell signed with Columbia Records and recorded a series of singles that reached top 40 charting positions on the American country singles chart. Her earliest recordings cut with producer Billy Sherrill combined country and soul music together. Among her first Columbia songs was "Tonight My Baby's Coming Home". The song's concept was based on a wife who was "lusting" after her truck-driving husband according to writer Kurt Wolff. The song was composed by Billy Sherrill along with Glenn Sutton. Sherrill also served as the song's producer. It was recorded at Columbia Recording Studios, located in Nashville, Tennessee. The session took place on September 29, 1971. On the same recording session, Mandrell also cut "Ain't It Good".

== Release and chart performance ==
"Tonight My Baby's Coming Home" was released as a single on Columbia Records on November 29, 1971. It was backed on the B-side by the song "He'll Never Take the Place of You". The track was issued by the label as a seven inch vinyl single. The single spent 13 weeks on America's Billboard country songs chart, peaking at number ten by December. It was Mandrell's second top ten hit single and first solo top ten hit in her career. In Canada, "Tonight My Baby's Coming Home" was her among first singles to enter the RPM Country Singles chart, climbing to number 34 in 1971. The song was released on Mandrell's second studio LP titled The Midnight Oil. The album was released in 1973.

== Track listing ==
7" vinyl single

- "Tonight My Baby's Coming Home" – 2:05
- "He'll Never Take the Place of You" – 3:13

== Charts ==
Chart performance for "Tonight My Baby's Coming Home"
| Chart (1971) | Peak position |
|---|---|
| Canada Country Songs (RPM) | 34 |
| US Hot Country Songs (Billboard) | 10 |
