= We Go Together =

Studio album by George Jones and Tammy Wynette
- Released: October 18, 1971
- Genre: Country
- Length: 27:00
- Label: Epic
- Producer: Billy Sherrill

George Jones and Tammy Wynette chronology
| We Go Together (1971) | Me and the First Lady (1972) |

George Jones chronology
| George Jones Sings the Great Songs of Leon Payne (1971) | We Go Together (1971) | A Picture of Me (Without You) (1972) |

Tammy Wynette chronology
| Tammy's Greatest Hits, Volume II (1971) | We Go Together (1971) | Bedtime Story (1972) |

Singles from We Go Together
- 1. "Take Me" Released: December 6, 1971

Professional ratings
Review scores
| Source | Rating |
|---|---|
| Allmusic | 3/5 stars |

We Go Together is the first studio album by American country music artists George Jones and Tammy Wynette. This album was released on October 18, 1971 on the Epic Records label. This is Jones' first album with Epic and his then wife Tammy Wynette. This is also Jones' first album with producer Billy Sherrill.

== Background ==
Although Jones and Wynette had been married since 1969 and had toured together for years, they had not been able to record together due to record contract constraints, although Tammy had sung backup on a handful of George's songs while he was on the Musicor label and had even appeared on the cover of his 1969 LP I'll Share My World With You. Jones eventually broke his contract with Musicor at a hefty sum so he could join Tammy at Epic Records and record with her producer Billy Sherrill. As Jones recalled in his memoir I Lived to Tell It All, "I paid $300,000 to get out of one contract so I could enter another." Jones pairing with Sherrill came as a surprise to many; Sherrill and business partner Glenn Sutton are regarded as the defining influences of the countrypolitan sound, a smooth amalgamation of pop and country music that was popular during the late 1960s and throughout the 1970s, a far cry from what was Jones' honky tonk roots.

As they admitted in the 1989 Jones documentary Same Ole Me, they were both extremely nervous, with Sherrill commenting, "I was scared to death. I was scared of him – he said he was scared of me." Sherrill added that one modification he did make to Jones's style was having him sing in lower keys because he found the vocals on his early records "really, really high, and kind of annoying, to me." In the same film, Jones explains that when the producer got to know him and his feelings that he wanted to do strictly country arrangements – what Jones called "hard-core country" – it all worked out. When asked about recording Jones and Wynette, Sherill told Dan Daley in 2002, "It did increase my scotch intake some. We started out trying to record the vocals together, but George drove Tammy crazy with his phrasing. He never, ever did it the same way twice. He could make a five-syllable word out of 'church.' Finally, Tammy said, 'Record George and let me listen to it, and then do my vocal after we get his on tape.' Tammy was a very quick study."

Jones had not been the presence he had been in the charts towards the end of his Musicor run but his association with Wynette, who was twelve years younger and had scored monster hits like "Stand by Your Man" in 1969, suddenly gave him a contemporary edge. Country music fans also ate up the fairy tale songs Sherrill brought around for them to record and they soon became the hottest duo in the country music business, touring together and selling out everywhere they went. Vocally, the pair was an almost perfect blend, and their first single together, a song Jones had released in 1965 called "Take Me", became a top ten hit.

The songs on We Go Together are almost all celebrations of new love to the point of giddiness, as Sherrill tried to find songs for them that reflected their new life together. Jones and Wynette composed two of the songs on the album, "It's So Sweet" and "Never Grow Cold", the latter having been recorded by Jones earlier when he was with Musicor. "Livin' On Easy Street" had also been recorded on Musicor as a duet with Melba Montgomery and, years later, Jones would maintain repeatedly that Montgomery fit his style of singing even better than Wynette did. The one somber song on the album is a reading of Jack Clement's "Just Someone I Used To Know", which had been a hit for Porter Wagoner and Dolly Parton (Jones had also recorded this song on his own years earlier when he was with United Artists). Also included on the album is "After Closing Time", which had been released as a duet single the prior year by David Houston and Barbara Mandrell.

== Reception ==
We Go Together eventually rose to number three on the country albums chart. Stephen Thomas Erlewine of AllMusic opines that We Go Together gains "most of its strength from George and Tammy’s easy, natural chemistry, which is evident and ebullient despite the sometimes rocky material."

== Track listing ==
| No. | Title | Writer(s) | Length |
|---|---|---|---|
| 1. | "We Go Together" | Sammy Lyons, Danny Walls, Norro Wilson | 2:35 |
| 2. | "It's So Sweet" | George Jones, Tammy Wynette | 2:32 |
| 3. | "Something to Brag About" | Bobby Braddock | 2:17 |
| 4. | "Never Grow Old" | Jones, Wynette | 2:47 |
| 5. | "You're Everything" | Wynette | 2:26 |
| 6. | "Take Me" | George Jones, Leon Payne | 2:26 |
| 7. | "Just Someone I Used to Know" | Jack Clement | 2:29 |
| 8. | "Living on Easy Street" | Earl Montgomery | 2:20 |
| 9. | "A Lifetime Left Together" | Wynette | 2:41 |
| 10. | "When True Love Steps In" | Shirley Tackett, Carmol Taylor | 2:16 |
| 11. | "After Closing Time" | Billy Sherrill, Danny Walls, Norro Wilson | 2:11 |

== Charting singles ==
| Single | Chart | Peak position |
|---|---|---|
| Take Me | U.S. Billboard Hot Country Singles | 9 |
| Take Me | Canadian Country (RPM) | 12 |
