= 'Til I Get It Right =

Single by Tammy Wynette

from the album My Man
- B-side: "Bridge of Love"
- Released: December 1972
- Studio: Columbia Studio B (Nashville, Tennessee)
- Genre: Country
- Label: Epic
- Songwriter(s): Red Lane; Larry Henley
- Producer(s): Billy Sherrill

Tammy Wynette singles chronology
"My Man (Understands)" (1972)	"'Til I Get It Right" (1972)	"Kids Say the Darndest Things" (1973)

"'Til I Get it Right" is a song recorded by American country music artist Tammy Wynette. It was released in December 1972 as the second single from the album My Man. The song was Wynette's twelfth number one, spending one week at number one and a total of twelve on the U.S. country singles chart. The song was written by Red Lane and Larry Henley.

In her memoir, Australian singer Diana Trask claimed that she had cut "'Til I Get It Right" first but was "immediately covered" by Wynette which resulted in her version never being released as a single. "I was furious – I seemed to come up against Tammy all the time and emerge the loser," she wrote. It was also recorded by Highway 101 and their 1991 album Bing Bang Boom.

== Chart performance ==
Chart (1972–1973)	Peak position
US Hot Country Songs (Billboard)	1
US Billboard Bubbling Under the Hot 100	106
Canadian RPM Country Tracks	1
