= We're Gonna Hold On =

Studio album by George Jones and Tammy Wynette
- Released: November 19, 1973
- Genre: Country
- Length: 27:49
- Label: Epic
- Producer: Billy Sherrill

George Jones and Tammy Wynette chronology
Let's Build a World Together (1973)	We're Gonna Hold On (1973)	George & Tammy & Tina (1975)

George Jones chronology
Nothing Ever Hurt Me (Half as Bad as Losing You) (1973)	We're Gonna Hold On (1973)	In a Gospel Way (1974)

Tammy Wynette chronology
Kids Say the Darndest Things (1973)	We're Gonna Hold On (1973)	Another Lonely Song (1974)

Singles from We're Gonna Hold On
- 1. "We're Gonna Hold On" Released: August 13, 1973; 2. "(We're Not) The Jet Set" Released: January 21, 1974

Professional ratings
Review scores
Source	Rating
Allmusic	2/5 stars

We're Gonna Hold On is the fifth studio album by country music artists George Jones and Tammy Wynette. It was released in 1973 (see 1973 in country music) on the Epic Records label.

== Background ==
After recording three duet albums together, country music's first couple finally scored a number one smash with "We're Gonna Hold On", a song Jones wrote with Earl Montgomery. The song's theme was the perseverance of love in the face of hardship, something that Jones and Wynette knew about all too well. As Bob Allen recounts in his book George Jones: The Life and Times of a Honky Tonk Legend, "Outside of a close circle of friends and business associates, few people realized the abject emotional squalor into which their marriage had sunk. The world at large was still deeply infatuated with their fame, their mansions and their expensive clothes and cars, and to fans, their marriage was still a precious thing indeed." Joan Dew, the co-author of Wynette’s autobiography Stand By Your Man, speculated to Nick Tosches in 1994 that Tammy was not only distraught by George’s drinking but jaded by the marriage as well: "I think she really got bored with him very quick down there. George is a little fuddy-duddy...He sits around and watches TV all day and goes fishing. George is only exciting onstage." In the BBC documentary Tammy Wynette: 'Til I Can Make It On My Own, Wynette's future husband George Richey recalled, "The writers who wrote for her, and there were about four of us who wrote regularly, would sort of write what was happening that day, and if she and Jones were having a tough time that's what we wrote about." As their marriage became more turbulent, their audience's fascination only increased. The album cover - two separate, non-smiling photos of George and Tammy partially overlapping each other - contrasts significantly with the sleeves of their previous duet albums.

The title song "We're Gonna Hold On" hit number 1 on Oct 27 1973 (for 2 weeks) and "(We're Not) The Jet Set" was a minor hit, reaching number 15.

== Reception ==
AllMusic: "...by this point, the two had become a part of the touring machine and the album seems to be built around a stage show. The songs, outside of the title track (a number one hit), aren't particularly memorable."

== Track listing ==
1. "We're Gonna Hold On" (George Jones, Earl Montgomery) 2:57
2. "When True Love Steps In" (Carmol Taylor, Shirley Tackett) 2:09
3. "Never Ending Song of Love" (Delaney Bramlett) 2:22
4. "Wouldn't I" (Bobby Braddock, Curly Putman) 2:08
5. "Roll in My Sweet Baby's Arms" (Lester Flatt) 2:48
6. "(We're Not) The Jet Set" (Bobby Braddock) 2:25
7. "Crawdad Song" (Billy Sherrill) 2:33
8. "If Loving You Starts Hurting Me" (George Richey, Earl Montgomery, Carl Montgomery) 2:55
9. "That Man of Mine" (Joyce McCord) 2:09
10. "Woman Loves Me Right" (Earl Montgomery) 2:51
11. "As Long as We Can" (Agnes Wilson, Roni Rivers) 2:32
