= Give a Little, Take a Little =

Single by Barbara Mandrell

from the album The Midnight Oil
- B-side: "Ain't It Good"
- Released: March 26, 1973
- Recorded: August 31, 1972
- Studio: Columbia Studio
- Genre: Countrypolitan; soul
- Length: 2:05
- Label: Columbia
- Songwriters: Michael Kossler; Steve Pippin
- Producer: Billy Sherrill

Barbara Mandrell singles chronology
"Holdin' On (To the Love I Got)" (1972)	"Give a Little, Take a Little" (1973)	"The Midnight Oil" (1973)

"Give a Little, Take a Little" is a song written by Michael Kossler and Steve Pippin, and recorded by American country music artist Barbara Mandrell. It was released in March 1973 as the fourth single from the album The Midnight Oil. It was one of Mandrell's early single releases in her career and among her first to reach the top 40 on the American country songs chart.

== Background, recording and release ==
"Give a Little, Take a Little" was composed by Michael Kossler and Steve Pippin. Barbara Mandrell recorded the song on August 31, 1972. Billy Sherrill served as the song's producer. In the same session, Mandrell also cut the single "Holdin' On (To the Love I Got).

The track was released as a single on Columbia Records on March 26, 1973. It was backed on the B-side by the song "Ain't It Good". The track was issued by the label as a seven inch vinyl single. The single spent 11 weeks on America's Billboard country songs chart, peaking at number 24 later in 1973. In Canada, the song reached the RPM Country Singles chart, climbing to number 29 in 1973. The song was released on Mandrell's second studio LP titled The Midnight Oil. The album was released in 1973.

== Track listing ==
7" vinyl single

- "Give a Little, Take a Little" – 2:39
- "Ain't It Good" – 2:15

== Charts ==
Chart performance for "Give a Little, Take a Little"
Chart (1973)	Peak position
Canada Country Songs (RPM)	29
US Hot Country Songs (Billboard)	24
