= Let's Build a World Together (song) =

Single by George Jones and Tammy Wynette

from the album Let's Build a World Together
- B-side: "Touching Shoulders"
- Released: March 7, 1973
- Recorded: 1973
- Genre: Country
- Length: 2:52
- Label: Epic
- Songwriters: Billy Sherrill, George Richey, Norro Wilson
- Producer: Billy Sherrill

George Jones and Tammy Wynette singles chronology
"Old Fashion Singing" (1972)	"Let's Build a World Together" (1973)	"We're Gonna Hold On" (1973)

"Let's Build a World Together" is a love song by George Jones and Tammy Wynette. It was the married couple's fourth single together on Epic Records and became the title track of their fourth LP in 1973. Although the song expressed the promise of new love, 1973 would be the beginning of the end as far as their marriage was concerned, with Wynette filing for divorce for the first time in August of that year. Their tumultuous personal life, which often made the gossip papers, coupled with their flawless vocal harmonies on love songs like "Let's Build a World Together," mesmerized their fans. Indeed, the more their lives deteriorated, the bigger hits the couple would have, especially after their 1975 divorce. However, "Let's Build a World Together" was a very minor hit at best, only making it to #32 on the Billboard singles chart. Co-writer George Richey became Wynette's fifth husband.

== Chart performance ==
Chart (1973)	Peak position
U.S. Billboard Hot Country Singles	32
Canadian RPM Country Tracks	-
