= Without Walls =

Studio album by Tammy Wynette
- Released: October 18, 1994
- Recorded: 1993–1994
- Genre: Country
- Length: 38:35
- Label: Epic
- Producer: Barry Beckett, Cliff Richard, Paul Moessl

Tammy Wynette chronology
Honky Tonk Angels (1993)	Without Walls (1994)	One (1995)

Singles from Without Walls
- 1. "Girl Thang" Released: September 1994; 2. "Every Breath You Take" Released: November 1994

Professional ratings
Review scores
Source	Rating
Allmusic	3/5 stars

Without Walls is the thirtieth and final studio album by American country music singer-songwriter Tammy Wynette. It was released on October 18, 1994, by Epic Records. It would turn out to be the final solo studio album Wynette released during her lifetime.

== Commercial performance ==
The album failed to chart on the Billboard Top Country Albums chart. The album's first single, "Girl Thang", peaked at No. 67 on the Billboard Hot Country Songs chart. The album's second single, "Every Breath You Take", did not chart.

== Track listing ==
Without Walls track listing
No.	Title	Writer(s)	Length
1.	"If It's the Last Thing I Do"	Doug Gill, Phillis Austin	3:57
2.	"A Woman's Needs" (duet with Elton John)	Elton John, Bernie Taupin	5:16
3.	"Every Breath You Take" (duet with Sting)	Sting	4:15
4.	"If You Were to Wake Up" (duet with Lyle Lovett)	Lyle Lovett	4:24
5.	"Glass Houses" (duet with Joe Diffie)	Rex Benson, Steve Gillette	3:35
6.	"Girl Thang" (duet with Wynonna)	Judy Rodman, Keith Hinton, Michele Laybourn	3:03
7.	"This Love" (duet with Cliff Richard)	Dave Cooke, Paul Field	4:00
8.	"I Second That Emotion" (duet with Smokey Robinson)	Alfred Cleveland, William Smokey Robinson	3:05
9.	"All I Am to You" (duet with Aaron Neville)	Mike Lantrip, Tom Paden, Toni Dae	3:42
10.	"What Do They Know"	Donny Kees, Richard Ross	3:18

== Personnel ==
All tracks except "This Love":

- Eddie Bayers – drums
- Barry Beckett – keyboards, producer
- Paul Franklin – steel guitar
- Owen Hale – drums
- Dann Huff – electric guitar
- Elton John – keyboards
- Phil Naish – keyboards
- Don Potter – acoustic guitar
- Michael Rhodes – bass
- Tom Roady – percussion
- Brent Rowan – electric guitar
- Sting – bass
- Harry Stinson – backing vocals
- Willie Weeks – bass
- Dennis Wilson – backing vocals
- Curtis Young – backing vocals

Personnel on "This Love":

- D. Bishop – soprano sax
- John Clarke – guitar
- Peter May – drums
- Paul Moessl – keyboards, synthesizer, producer
- Cliff Richard – producer
- Frank Ricotti – percussion
- (20 personnel) – strings

== Charts ==
Chart performance for Without Walls
Chart (1994)	Peak position
Australian Albums (ARIA)	8
