= Promise Land, Arkansas =

Coordinates: 36.427°N 92.529°W

Promise Land (sometimes Promised Land) is a small settlement mostly in Marion County, Arkansas. It is close to Oakland, Arkansas, and the two are often referred to together as "Oakland–Promise Land". The community is centered on Promise Land Road which extends across the Marion-Baxter County line.

== Landmarks ==
- Promise Land Bible Church is at 8256 Promise Land Road, in Baxter County.
- Promise Land Cemetery is a small cemetery on the south side of Promise Land Road, on Promise Land Ridge near Bull Shoals Reservoir.

== Notable people ==
- George Richey American songwriter and record producer, born in Promise Land 1935.

== See also ==
- Oakland, Arkansas
