= George Jones Sings the Great Songs of Leon Payne =

Studio album by George Jones
- Released: 1971
- Genre: Country
- Length: 24:01
- Label: Musicor

George Jones chronology
George Jones with Love (1971)	George Jones Sings the Great Songs of Leon Payne (1971)	George Jones (We Can Make It) (1972)

George Jones Sings the Great Songs of Leon Payne is an album by American country music artist George Jones, released in 1971 on the Musicor Records label containing nine Leon Payne covers and one Jones co-write with Payne, "Take Me". Eight of the ten songs on this album had been released on earlier Jones albums. Of those eight, three were re-recorded in 1970 and included here, and the other five are just re-releases of the original 1960s recordings. The two previously unreleased songs, "Brothers of a Bottle" and "Lifetime to Regret", were also recorded in 1970. This was the last Jones "studio" album that was released by Musicor as he had already signed with Epic Records.

== Reception ==
Professional ratings
Review scores
Source	Rating
AllMusic	link
The Rolling Stone Album Guide	3.5/5 stars

The album, which features some of Payne's more obscure songs, reached number 26 on the country albums chart. Stephen Thomas Erlewine of AllMusic calls the album one of the finest minor gems in the Possum's catalogue: "From ballads like "Blue Side of Lonesome" to uptempo honky tonkers like "Brothers of a Bottle," all of the cuts on The Great Songs of Leon Payne are first-rate and Jones brings each of them to life."

== Track listing ==
All songs written by Leon Payne, except for the co-write with George Jones on "Take Me".

No.	Title	Re-Recording date/Original Album	Length
1.	"They'll Never Take Her Love from Me"	11/16/70	2:40
2.	"Brothers of a Bottle"	9/22/70	2:48
3.	"Blue Side of Lonesome"	original 1966 Love Bug album version	2:45
4.	"There's No Justice"	9/22/70	2:32
5.	"With Half a Heart"	9/21/70	2:47
6.	"Lifetime to Regret"	11/16/70	2:47
7.	"Let a Little Loving Come In"	original 1965 Mr. Country & Western Music album version	2:21
8.	"Take Me"	original 1965 New Country Hits album version	2:46
9.	"The Selfishness in Man"	original 1965 Mr. Country & Western Music album version	2:45
10.	"Things Have Gone to Pieces"	original 1965 For the First Time! Two Great Stars - George Jones and Gene Pitney album version	2:55
