= I Will Follow You =

Single by Schiller with Hen Ree

from the album Atemlos
- Released: 11 June 2010
- Genre: Electronica
- Label: Island Records (Universal Music)
- Songwriter: Christopher von Deylen
- Producer: Christopher von Deylen

Schiller singles chronology
"Try" (2010)	"I Will Follow You" (2010)	"Sonne" (2012)

I Will Follow You is the second single from the 2010 Schiller gold album Atemlos with vocals by Swedish singer Hen Ree (Rickard Olsén). The single was officially released on 11 June 2010 and did not chart. The single CD included a Magnet with the cover of the Atemlos album. The Remixes were released as a download single on 2 July 2010. The music video was shot in Berlin, Germany.

== Track listing ==
=== Maxi single ===
No.	Title	Length
1.	"I Will Follow You (Radio Version)"	3:47
2.	"I Will Follow You (Album Version)"	4:35

=== Remixes (Download single) ===
Released on 2 July 2010.

No.	Title	Length
1.	"I Will Follow You (Dave Ramone Mix)"	6:17
2.	"I Will Follow You (Dave Ramone Edit 2)"	2:48
3.	"I Will Follow You (Niels Van Gogh Vs. Sunloverz Remix)"	7:12
4.	"I Will Follow You (Niels Van Gogh Vs. Sunloverz Dub Mix)"	7:12
5.	"I Will Follow You (Niels Van Gogh Vs. Sunloverz Short Edit)"	3:49

== Credits ==
- Music written and produced by Christopher von Deylen
- Artwork by Katja Stier

== Music video ==
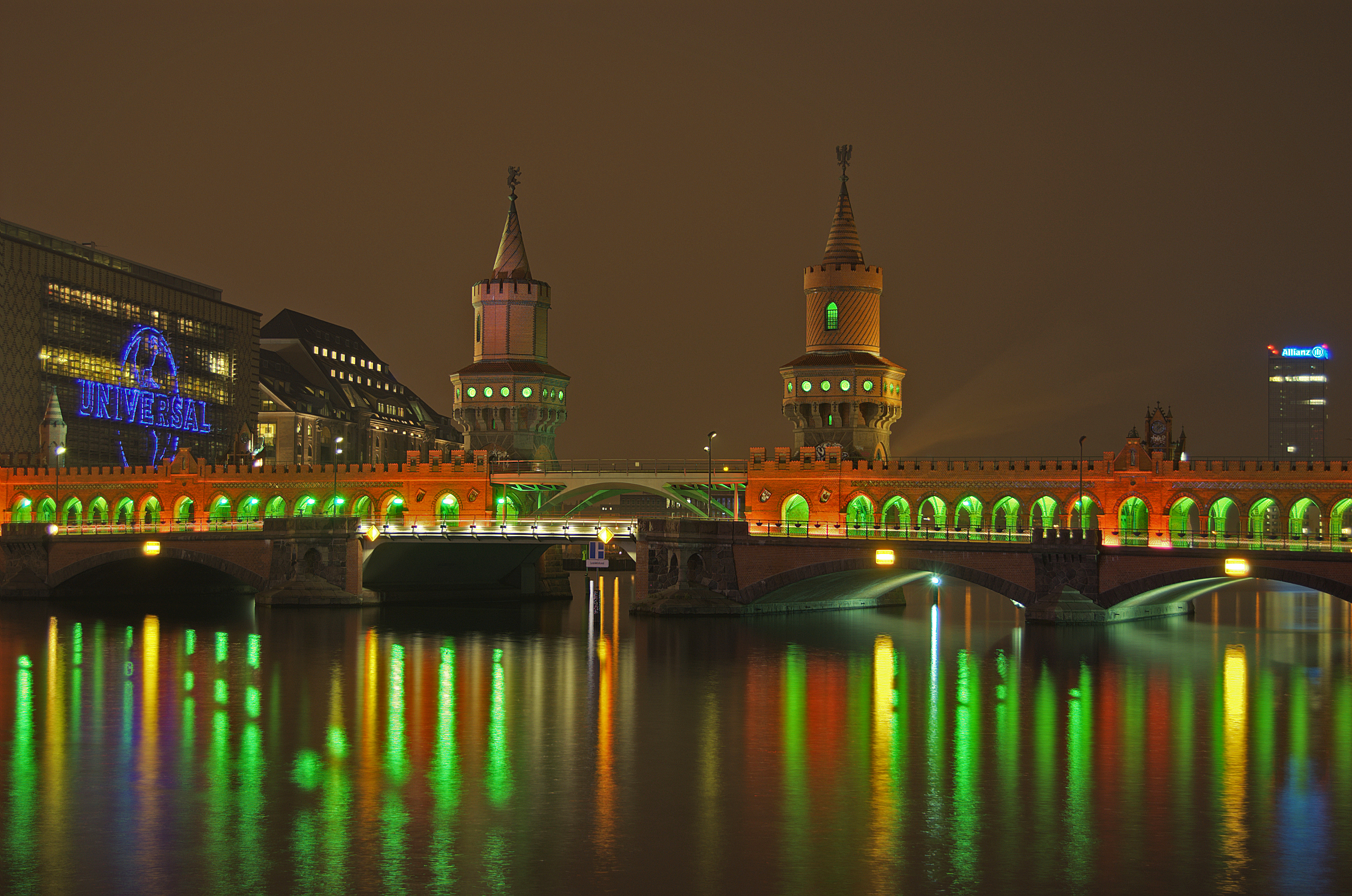
One of the locations of the video shot: The Oberbaum Bridge in Berlin

The official music video for "I Will Follow You" was produced by Tribune Records and Jörg Kundinger Produktion and was shot in 2010 in Germany by German director Jörg Kundinger. Director of photography was Oliver Ackermann. The post production was made by GMP (Garnier Media Produktion). The video has a length of 3:41 minutes. The music video was shot in the German capital city Berlin. The video features alternately cityscape shots of Berlin and shots of different people from Berlin, which are sometimes singing to the lyrics of the song. One of the shown persons is the German actress Mila Böhning (* 2001). The shots of the city were made with the tilt–shift effect.

Some of the shown locations and buildings are the Oberbaum Bridge, the Strausberger Platz, the Marx-Engels-Forum, the Alexanderplatz, Unter den Linden, the Museum Island, the Rotes Rathaus and the O2 World.
