= I'll Follow You (Up to Our Cloud) =

Single by George Jones

from the album George Jones with Love
- B-side: "Getting Over the Storm"
- Released: 1971
- Recorded: 1971
- Genre: Country
- Length: 2:41
- Label: Musicor
- Songwriter(s): David Turner
- Producer(s): Pappy Daily

George Jones singles chronology
| "Right Won't Touch a Hand" (1971) | "I'll Follow You (Up to Our Cloud)" (1971) | "We Can Make It" (1972) |

"I'll Follow You (Up to Our Cloud)" is a song by George Jones. It was written by David Turner.

== History ==
This was Jones' thirty-second and final single release on Musicor before joining his wife Tammy Wynette at Epic Records.

== Lyrics ==
The song is sung from the perspective of an elderly man who cannot bear the thought of leaving his wife alone after he dies and promises to hold on until it's her time; only then will he "let go" and follow her "up to our cloud."

== Reception ==
The song failed to make the Top 10, peaking at #13.

== Pappy Daily ==
The single marked the end of Jones' relationship with producer and manager Pappy Daily, who had guided his career from the beginning. The parting was acrimonious; in Bob Allen's 1983 book George Jones: The Life and Times of a Honky Tonk Legend, the author quotes Jones in interviews complaining about the uneven quality of his recordings and raising questions about the royalty rights that he alleged he had hastily relinquished in the document signing that had accompanied each of his record-label changes. In 1994, record producer Huey Meaux, who had known Jones from the 1940s, defended Daily, insisting to Nick Tosches in the Texas Monthly, "He was George’s career. He was George’s daddy. He was George’s everything. And George gave him a lot of goddam hell, man. Getting drunk, getting in trouble, getting in fights. Pappy was the only one that could sit down and talk to George. Pappy got George back together so many times it’s unreal."

== Sources ==
- Allen, Bob (30 November 1995). George Jones: The Life and Times of a Honky Tonk Legend. St Martins Press(Mm). ISBN 978-0-312-95698-1.
