= George & Tammy & Tina =

Studio album by George Jones and Tammy Wynette
- Released: February 10, 1975
- Genre: Country
- Length: 25:36
- Label: Epic
- Producer: Billy Sherrill

George Jones and Tammy Wynette chronology
We're Gonna Hold On (1973)	George & Tammy & Tina (1975)	Golden Ring (1976)

George Jones chronology
The Grand Tour (1974)	George & Tammy & Tina (1975)	Memories of Us (1975)

Tammy Wynette chronology
Woman to Woman (1974)	George & Tammy & Tina (1975)	I Still Believe in Fairy Tales (1975)

Singles from George & Tammy & Tina
- 1. "We Loved It Away" Released: July 15, 1974; 2. "God's Gonna Get'cha (For That)" Released: April 28, 1975

George & Tammy & Tina is the sixth studio album by American country music artists George Jones and Tammy Wynette. The "Tina" in the title refers to Tina Byrd Jones, Tammy Wynette's then eight-year-old daughter from her marriage to Euple Byrd. George Jones adopted Tina and her sisters shortly after the birth of their daughter, Georgette. The album was released in 1975 on the Epic Records label. It peaked at number 37 on the Billboard country albums chart. The opening track, "We Loved It Away", reached number 8 on the Billboard country singles chart. Another single released that year, "God's Gonna Get'cha (For That)", peaked at number 25 on the Billboard country singles chart. In March 1974, a single was issued with two songs that ended up on the album, "No Charge", a collaboration between Tammy and her daughter, Tina, and the flip-side, "The Telephone Call", which is a collaboration between George and Tina and peaked as at number 25 on the Billboard country singles chart in 1974.

== Track listing ==
No.	Title	Writer(s)	Length
1.	"We Loved It Away"	George Richey, Carmol Taylor	2:28
2.	"Ain't Love Been Good"	Earl Montgomery, George Jones	2:45
3.	"We're Putting It Back Together"	Sammy Lyons, Danny Walls	2:07
4.	"It"	Bobby Braddock	2:31
5.	"The Telephone Call"	Billy Sherrill, Carmol Taylor	2:28
6.	"God's Gonna Get'cha (For That)"	Eddie Collins	2:38
7.	"Number One"	Jerry Chesnut	2:05
8.	"Closer Than Ever"	George Jones, Carmol Taylor, Norro Wilson	2:15
9.	"Those Were the Good Times"	Glenn Martin	3:10
10.	"No Charge"	Harlan Howard	3:09

== Personnel ==
- The Nashville Edition
- The Jordanaires - vocal accompaniment
- Strings arranged by Bergen White

=== Production ===
- Producer - Billy Sherrill
- Engineer - Lou Bradley
