= Golden Ring (album) =

Studio album by George Jones and Tammy Wynette
- Released: August 9, 1976
- Recorded: December 12, 1974–April 1976
- Studio: Columbia (Nashville, Tennessee)
- Genre: Country
- Length: 26:12
- Label: Epic
- Producer: Billy Sherrill

George Jones and Tammy Wynette chronology
George & Tammy & Tina (1975)	Golden Ring (1976)	Greatest Hits (1977)

George Jones chronology
Alone Again (1976)	Golden Ring (1976)	The Battle (1976)

Tammy Wynette chronology
'Til I Can Make It on My Own (1976)	Golden Ring (1976)	You and Me (1976)

Singles from Golden Ring
- 1. "Golden Ring" Released: May 24, 1976; 2. "Near You" Released: November 29, 1976

Golden Ring is the seventh studio album by American country music artists George Jones and Tammy Wynette, released in August 1976 on the Epic Records label. It reached No. 1 on the Billboard Country Album chart. The singles "Near You" and "Golden Ring" both reached No. 1 on the Country Singles chart.

== Background ==
Although Jones and Wynette had divorced in 1975, Epic still released duets they had recorded together because public interest in the couple remained so intense. In fact, Golden Ring would be their only number one LP together, and the pair would score four top five hits between 1976 and 1980. As Bob Allen points out in his biography George Jones: The Life and Times of a Honky Tonk Legend, the couple, who had endured a very bitter, public divorce, were forced to make appearances together because "After the divorce, the demand for concert bookings with either Tammy or George, separately, fell off drastically...Tammy found herself strangely ill at ease in front of disappointed and often angry audience members, a few of whom never failed to holler and scream, even in the middle of one of her songs: 'Where's George!?'" (In a 1995 television special on The Nashville Network, Wynette recalled that she would often reply, "I don't know and he doesn't know, either.") Jones was faring little better: his 1975 album Memories of Us had barely broken the top 50 on Billboard, stalling at number 43. Jones, who at the time made no secret of the fact that he still carried a torch for his ex-wife, later addressed the issue of reteaming with Wynette in his 1996 memoir by insisting, "That wasn't my idea. In fact, I hated to work with her. It brought back too many unpleasant memories, and when some fans saw us together, they got it in their heads that we were going to get back together romantically." The album cover, which looks like the stoic couple are silently watching television at home together, is a far cry from the beaming faces that appeared on their earlier albums just a few years before. Jones accepted the responsibility for the failure of the marriage but vehemently denied Wynette's allegations in her autobiography that he beat her and fired a shotgun at her. Their next album, Together Again, would not come until four years in 1980.

== Composition ==
The song "Golden Ring" was conceived by songwriter Bobby Braddock, who had seen a television drama about the life of a handgun. The story showed the gun changing hands several times, with a hunter, police officer, criminal and a father of a 2-year-old child all owning the gun at one point, with the consequences played out in each segment. Braddock applied the same concept to a song about the life of a wedding ring. Here, a young couple from Chicago - apparently very much in love - goes to a pawn shop to shop for a ring for their upcoming wedding. The man (both characters are unnamed in the song) laments that he is unable to pick out a more expensive band, but he's willing to buy it to show how much he loves his bride-to-be, whom - in the song's second verse - he marries in a small wedding chapel later on that afternoon. In the third verse, the couple has been fighting which leads to "their final round". The man accuses his wife of planning to leave town; the woman retorts by telling her husband she doesn't love him anymore and throws down the ring "as she walks out the door." The final verse features the ring once again in a pawnshop waiting for its next owners. The refrains tell about the meaning of the ring through its lifecycle with the couple with the hook: "By itself, it's just a cold metallic thing, only love can make a golden wedding ring". The song could not have been a better fit for Jones and Wynette in 1976 in the wake of their broken marriage and shot to the top of the charts. This was followed with another number one, "Near You", a pop standard written and originally recorded by Francis Craig and His Orchestra in 1947 with lyrics provided by Kermit Goell. Recorded in the winter of 1974, it reached the top of the country charts in 1977, its atypical arrangement proof positive that country fans still had an appetite for any music performed by the estranged couple. Golden Ring also includes a painfully sad version of the Buck Owens composition "Cryin' Time".

== Reception ==
Writing for AllMusic, Thom Jurek deems Golden Ring "simply a classic," enthusing: "This is a set full of heartbreak songs accompanied by real heartbreak. Jones went on a multi-year bender after the divorce was final, putting his health, reputation, and even career on the line. It's no stretch to say that these songs are loaded with emotion..." In July 2013 Uncut called the LP "A collection of brutal songs...sung by two people breaking each other's hearts."

Professional ratings
Review scores
Source	Rating
Allmusic	link

== Track listing ==
No.	Title	Writer(s)	Length
1.	"Golden Ring"	Bobby Braddock, Rafe Van Hoy	3:04
2.	"Even the Bad Times Are Good"	Carl Belew, Clyde Pitts	2:49
3.	"Near You"	Francis Craig, Rob Goellner, Kermit Goell	2:22
4.	"Cryin' Time"	Buck Owens	2:42
5.	"I've Seen Better Days"	Red Lane, Danny Morrison	3:40
6.	"Did You Ever?"	Bobby Braddock	2:07
7.	"Tattletale Eyes"	Jody Emerson	2:41
8.	"I'll Be There (If You Ever Want Me)"	Ray Price, Rusty Gabbard	1:55
9.	"If You Don't, Somebody Else Will"	Johnny "Country" Mathis, Jimmy Lee Fautheree, Geraldine Hamilton	1:55
10.	"Keep the Change"	Carmol Taylor, Billy Sherrill, Monroe Fields	2:57
