= Kids Say the Darndest Things (song) =

Single by Tammy Wynette

from the album Kids Say the Darndest Things
- B-side: "I Wish I Had a Mommy Like You"
- Released: March 1973
- Genre: Country
- Label: Epic
- Songwriter(s): Billy Sherrill; Glenn Sutton
- Producer(s): Billy Sherrill

Tammy Wynette singles chronology
"'Til I Get It Right" (1972)	"Kids Say the Darndest Things" (1973)	"One Final Stand" (1973)

"Kids Say the Darndest Things" is a song written by Billy Sherrill and Glenn Sutton, and recorded by American country music artist Tammy Wynette. According to the liner notes of her 1992 boxed set, "Tears of Fire: The 25th Anniversary Collection," the song was recorded in 1969. It would shortly serve as the title track of a compilation album of Wynette's child-themed songs.

== Song Background ==
In the song, the narrator reveals her marital problems, by way of innocent comments her small children repeat, which they'd overheard their parents make ("My four-year old said 'I want a divorce', now where did she hear that").

== Chart performance ==
The song was released in March 1973 as the only single from her album of the same name. It was Wynette's thirteenth number one on the U.S. country singles chart, staying at number one for a single week and spending a total of thirteen weeks on the chart.

Chart (1973)	Peak position
U.S. Billboard Hot Country Singles	1
U.S. Billboard Hot 100	72
Canadian RPM Country Tracks	2
