= One (George Jones and Tammy Wynette album) =

1995 album by George Jones and Tammy Wynette

Studio album by George Jones and Tammy Wynette
- Released: June 20, 1995
- Genre: Country
- Length: 31:19
- Label: MCA Nashville
- Producer: Tony Brown; Norro Wilson

George Jones and Tammy Wynette chronology
Together Again (1980)	One (1995)

George Jones chronology
George and Tammy Super Hits (1995)	One (1995)	I Lived to Tell It All (1996)

Tammy Wynette chronology
Without Walls (1994)	One (1995)

Singles from One
- 1. "One" Released: May 1995

Professional ratings
Review scores
Source	Rating
Allmusic	2/5 stars

One is the ninth and final studio album by American country music artists George Jones and Tammy Wynette. This album was released on June 20, 1995, on the MCA Nashville Records label. It was Jones and Wynette's first album together in 15 years; it would also turn out to be their last album together. The album was Wynette's last studio album she would record before her death in 1998.

== Reception ==
AllMusic calls One "a pleasant listen" and contends, "The main pleasure of the record is hearing George and Tammy together again after all these years, but if One is judged by their previous efforts, it looks rather thin."

== Track listing ==
No.	Title	Writer(s)	Length
1.	"One"	Ed Bruce, Judith Bruce, Ron Peterson	4:10
2.	"It's an Old Love Thing"	Kenny Cornell	2:40
3.	"What Ever Happened to Us"	Donny Kees, Don Sampson	4:16
4.	"Will You Travel Down This Road with Me"	Kieran Kane, Jamie O'Hara	3:10
5.	"(She's Just) An Old Love Turned Memory"	John Schweers	3:08
6.	"If God Met You"	Freida Wells, Mae Daniels	2:51
7.	"Just Look What We've Started Again"	Dennis Knutson, A.L. "Doodle" Owens	3:20
8.	"Solid as a Rock"	Max D. Barnes, Merle Haggard	2:30
9.	"They're Playing Our Song"	Toni Dae, Barry Paul Jackson, Buck Moore	3:08
10.	"All I Have to Offer You Is Me"	Dallas Frazier, Owens	3:26

== Personnel ==
- Brian Ahern – acoustic guitar, electric guitar
- Richard Bailey – banjo
- Eddie Bayers – drums
- Harold Bradley – bass guitar, six-string bass guitar
- David Briggs – keyboards
- Glen Duncan – fiddle
- Stuart Duncan – fiddle
- Paul Franklin – pedal steel guitar
- Steve Gibson – electric guitar
- Owen Hale – drums
- Randy Howard – fiddle
- John Hughey – pedal steel guitar
- Roy Huskey Jr. – upright bass
- George Jones – acoustic guitar, lead vocals, background vocals
- Liana Manis – background vocals
- Brent Mason – electric guitar
- Mac McAnally – acoustic guitar
- Steve Nathan – keyboards
- Louis Dean Nunley – background vocals
- Jennifer O'Brien – background vocals
- Hargus "Pig" Robbins – keyboards
- Matt Rollings – keyboards
- John Wesley Ryles – background vocals
- Randy Scruggs – acoustic guitar
- Glenn Worf – bass guitar
- Tammy Wynette – lead vocals, background vocals
- Curtis Young – background vocals
