= The Midnight Oil (song) =

Single by Barbara Mandrell

from the album The Midnight Oil
- B-side: "In the Name of Love"
- Released: July 25, 1973
- Recorded: May 25, 1973
- Studio: Columbia Studio
- Genre: Countrypolitan; soul
- Length: 2:40
- Label: Columbia
- Songwriter: Joe Allen
- Producer: Billy Sherrill

Barbara Mandrell singles chronology
"Give a Little, Take a Little" (1973)	"The Midnight Oil" (1973)	"This Time I Almost Made It" (1974)

"The Midnight Oil" is a song written by Joe Allen, and recorded by American country music artist Barbara Mandrell. It was released in July 1973 as the fifth single and title track from the album The Midnight Oil. The song received positive critical reception and became one of Mandrell's first top ten hits on the North American country music charts.

== Background and recording ==
Barbara Mandrell made the shift from background musician to recording artist upon signing to Columbia Records in 1970. Her singles reached the top 40 of country songs chart. Her highest-charting country single during this period was 1973's "The Midnight Oil". Composed by Joe Allen, the song told the story of a woman who lies working late in an effort to have her husband not find out that she is carrying on an affair. The song was considered to be one of the first "cheating songs" to be performed by a woman. The track was recorded on May 25, 1973, in a session produced by Billy Sherrill at the Columbia Studio, located in Nashville, Tennessee.

== Critical reception ==
"The Midnight Oil" has received a positive reception from critics and writers. Kurt Wolff of Country Music: The Rough Guide called a "late-night love tryst" and a "cheating song". Greg Adams of AllMusic praised the song in reviewing her 1997 compilation Super Hits, calling its production "glossy" and "firmly rooted in the 70s". He concluded by calling the track (along with the album's additional material) among "the best recordings Barbara Mandrell ever made."

== Release and chart performance ==
"The Midnight Oil" was released as a single on Columbia Records on July 25, 1973. It was backed on the B-side by the song "In the Name of Love". The track was issued by the label as a seven inch vinyl single. The single spent multiple weeks on America's Billboard country songs chart, peaking at number seven by the end of the year. It was Mandrell's second single to reach the top ten of the country songs chart in the United States. It was also her highest-climbing solo single up to that point. In Canada, "The Midnight Oil" was her first top ten entry on RPM Country Singles chart, peaking at number five in 1973. The song was released on Mandrell's second studio LP, also titled The Midnight Oil. The album was released in November 1973.

== Track listing ==
7" vinyl single

- "The Midnight Oil" – 2:40
- "In the Name of Love" – 2:08

== Charts ==
Chart performance for "The Midnight Oil"
Chart (1973)	Peak position
Canada Country Songs (RPM)	5
US Hot Country Songs (Billboard)	7
