= Me and the First Lady =

Studio album by George Jones and Tammy Wynette
- Released: August 7, 1972
- Genre: Country
- Length: 27:24
- Label: Epic
- Producer: Billy Sherrill

George Jones and Tammy Wynette chronology
We Go Together (1971)	Me and the First Lady (1972)	We Love to Sing About Jesus (1972)

George Jones chronology
George Jones (We Can Make It) (1972)	Me and the First Lady (1972)	We Love to Sing About Jesus (1972)

Tammy Wynette chronology
Bedtime Story (1972)	Me and the First Lady (1972)	My Man (1972)

Singles from Me and the First Lady
- 1. "The Ceremony" Released: June 19, 1972

Me and the First Lady is the second studio album by country music artists George Jones and Tammy Wynette, released on August 7, 1972, on the Epic Records label.

== Recording and composition ==
The duets found on the early albums that Jones and Wynette recorded together feature songs that almost always celebrate the joys of domestic bliss and true love, something producer Billy Sherrill did purposefully to reflect the assumptions of their captivated audience. A good example of this is "The Ceremony", a song Sherrill co-wrote; the song, which mimics a wedding service, begins with a minister's preamble over a church organ and contains verses where George and Tammy renew their vows and profess their love for each other. It became a highlight of their live shows, with Bob Allen wryly noting in his book George Jones: The Saga of an American Singer: "When they sang "The Ceremony" onstage in places like Sioux City and Peoria, they enacted for the benefit of their fans an elaborate wedding ritual which, in reality, was quite unlike the quickie civil ceremony with which they'd actually sealed their nuptial bond." In 1996 Jones admitted in his autobiography, "It sounds cheesy now, but it was a show-stopper for two people whose divorce was often the subject of tabloid speculation. People went crazy when we did 'The Ceremony' live."

As if mirroring their doomed marriage, a couple of the songs on Me and the First Lady hint at the cracks that had already appeared in the relationship of country music's first couple: "A Lovely Place To Cry" (co-written by Wynette with Earl Montgomery) and "The Great Divide" both contemplate fading love and the possibility of divorce.

== Reception ==
Jones biographer Bob Allen has a dim view of the album, comparing the "syrupy" songs to "two-and-a-half-minute-long musical Cliff's Notes to Harlequin novels."

Professional ratings
Review scores
Source	Rating
Allmusic	link

== Track listing ==
No.	Title	Writer(s)	Length
1.	"We Believe in Each Other"	Curly Putman	2:39
2.	"Lovely Place to Cry"	Tammy Wynette, Earl Montgomery	2:45
3.	"There's Power in Our Love"	Montgomery	2:11
4.	"Perfect Match"	Glenn Sutton, Ben Peters	2:11
5.	"Great Divide"	Putman	2:40
6.	"To Live on Love"	Montgomery	2:57
7.	"You and Me Together"	Jimmy Peppers	1:52
8.	"Lovin' You Is Worth It"	Carmol Taylor, Quinton Claunch	2:28
9.	"We're Gonna Try to Get Along"	Peppers	2:08
10.	"It's Been A Beautiful Life"	Taylor, Billy Sherrill	2:27
11.	"The Ceremony"	Taylor, Sherrill, Jenny Strickland	3:06

== Charts ==
Chart (1973)	Peak position
US Top Country Albums (Billboard)	6

== Charting Singles ==
Single	Chart	Peak position
The Ceremony	U.S. Billboard Hot Country Singles	6
The Ceremony	Canadian Country (RPM)	3
