= My Man (Understands) =

- German release picture sleeve

Single by Tammy Wynette

from the album My Man
- B-side: "Things I Love to Do"
- Released: August 16, 1972
- Studio: Columbia Studio B (Nashville, Tennessee)
- Genre: Country
- Label: Epic
- Songwriter(s): Billy Sherrill; Norro Wilson; Carmol Taylor
- Producer(s): Billy Sherrill

Tammy Wynette singles chronology
"Reach Out Your Hand (And Touch Somebody)" (1972)	"My Man (Understands)" (1972)	"'Til I Get It Right" (1972)

"My Man (Understands)" is a song written by Billy Sherrill, Norro Wilson and Carmol Taylor, and recorded by American country music artist Tammy Wynette. It was released in August 1972 as the first single from the album My Man. The song was Wynette's twentieth release on the country charts. "My Man (Understands)" went to number one for a single week on the country charts and spent twelve weeks on the chart.

== Chart performance ==
Chart (1972)	Peak position
US Hot Country Songs (Billboard)	1
Canadian RPM Country Tracks	1
