= Let's Build a World Together =

Studio album by George Jones and Tammy Wynette
- Released: February 5, 1973
- Recorded: 1973
- Genre: Country
- Length: 29:33
- Label: Epic
- Producer: Billy Sherrill

George Jones and Tammy Wynette chronology
We Love to Sing About Jesus (1972)	Let's Build a World Together (1973)	We're Gonna Hold On (1973)

George Jones chronology
We Love to Sing About Jesus (1972)	Let's Build a World Together (1973)	Nothing Ever Hurt Me (Half as Bad as Losing You) (1973)

Tammy Wynette chronology
We Love to Sing About Jesus (1972)	Let's Build a World Together (1973)	Kids Say the Darndest Things (1973)

Singles from Let's Build a World Together
- 1. "Let's Build a World Together" Released: March 7, 1973

Professional ratings
Review scores
Source	Rating
Allmusic	2.5/5 stars

Let's Build a World Together is the fourth studio album by the country music artists George Jones and Tammy Wynette. The album was released in 1973 (see 1973 in country music) on the Epic Records label. It peaked at number 12 on the Billboard Country Albums chart.

== Background ==
Let's Build a World Together contains more songs celebrating the fairy tale romance of country music's royal couple featuring producer Billy Sherrill's Phil Spector-influenced production. Regardless of what the reality may have been, country fans couldn't get enough of the pair who appeared to be living every word they sang. As Eugene Chadbourne of AllMusic astutely observes, "The chemistry that develops between partners in a male and female country music duo can sometimes be based on fantasy, as was obviously the case with Loretta Lynn and Ernest Tubb, who no country listener even imagined for a moment were romantically involved. Tammy Wynette and George Jones, on the other hand, did have a relationship." The truth was not as idyllic as their fans preferred to imagine it.

Years later, in the documentary Stand By Your Dream, Wynette recalled, "It was very difficult on us, both of us being in the business and both of us being together twenty-four hours a day. We were constantly together. We never had any breathing room, no space...And Jones had a very bad drinking problem, and I knew that when we married, but, you know, you always think, 'Oh shoot, he'll be so happy when he marries me and that'll all stop.' You think you can change somebody but you never can. And it wasn't all his fault...I nagged him about his drinkin' an awful lot because he has cirrhosis of the liver and the doctors told him that it was gonna kill him if he did not quit drinkin'. Well, you can't sit by and watch someone you love totally destroy themselves and not try and do something. Maybe I did it in the wrong way but it was the only way I knew to do it at the time."

The album produced no big hits, although the stunning title track was released as a single and reached number 32 on the charts. Other notable tracks include two standards, "After the Fire is Gone", a duet that Conway Twitty and Loretta Lynn took to number one in 1971, and "My Elusive Dreams", a duet Wynette and David Houston also took to number one in 1967. Jones and Wynette also wrote "Touching Shoulders" together.

== Reception ==
AllMusic writes: "The blend of these two beautiful voices is of course a great moment in country history, but this is one of those albums where it is the songs, and not the singers, that have to provide something for the country fan to gnaw on other than distracted thoughts about what the world they built might have really been like."

== Track listing ==
No.	Title	Writer(s)	Length
1.	"Let's Build a World Together"	George Richey, Billy Sherrill, Norris Wilson	2:52
2.	"The World Needs a Melody"	Larry Henley, Red Lane, Johnny Slate	3:21
3.	"When I Stop Dreaming"	Charlie Louvin, Ira Louvin	3:15
4.	"After the Fire is Gone"	L. E. White	2:24
5.	"My Elusive Dreams"	Curly Putman, Billy Sherrill	3:33
6.	"Your Shining Face"	Joe Allen, Buddy Killen	2:47
7.	"Touching Shoulders"	George Jones, Tammy Wynette	2:21
8.	"Love Is All We Need"	Duke Goff, Mark Sherrill	2:05
9.	"Help the People"	George Jones, Earl Montgomery	2:08
10.	"Our Way of Life"	Earl Montgomery, Carl Montgomery	2:23
11.	"This Growing Old Together Love We Share"	Jenny Strickland, Carmol Taylor, Norris Wilson	2:24

== Charts ==
Chart (1976)	Peak position
US Top Country Albums (Billboard)	12

== Charting Singles ==
Single	Chart	Peak position
Let's Build A World Together	U.S. Billboard Hot Country Singles	32
