= Reach Out Your Hand (And Touch Somebody) =

Single by Tammy Wynette

from the album Bedtime Story
- B-side: "Love's the Answer"
- Released: April 1972
- Genre: Country
- Label: Epic
- Songwriter(s): Billy Sherrill; Tammy Wynette
- Producer(s): Billy Sherrill

Tammy Wynette singles chronology
"Bedtime Story" (1971)	"Reach Out Your Hand (And Touch Somebody)" (1972)	"My Man (Understands)" (1972)

"Reach Out Your Hand (And Touch Somebody)" is a song recorded by American country music artist Tammy Wynette. It was released in April 1972 as the second single from her album Bedtime Story. The song peaked at number 2 on the Billboard Hot Country Singles chart. It also reached number 1 on the RPM Country Tracks chart in Canada. The song was written by Wynette, along with Billy Sherrill.

== Charts ==
=== Weekly charts ===
Chart (1972)	Peak position
US Hot Country Songs (Billboard)	2
Canadian RPM Country Tracks	1

=== Year-end charts ===
Chart (1972)	Position
US Hot Country Songs (Billboard)	42
