= We Love to Sing About Jesus =

Studio album by George Jones and Tammy Wynette
- Released: November 6, 1972
- Genres: Country; Gospel
- Length: 26:02
- Label: Epic
- Producer: Billy Sherrill

George Jones and Tammy Wynette chronology
Me and the First Lady (1972)	We Love to Sing About Jesus (1972)	Let's Build a World Together (1973)

George Jones chronology
Me and the First Lady (1972)	We Love to Sing About Jesus (1972)	Let's Build a World Together (1973)

Tammy Wynette chronology
My Man (1972)	We Love to Sing About Jesus (1972)	Let's Build a World Together (1973)

Singles from We Love to Sing About Jesus
- 1. "Old Fashioned Singing" Released: October 31, 1972

Professional ratings
Review scores
Source	Rating
Allmusic	2/5 stars

We Love to Sing About Jesus is the third studio album by country music artists George Jones and Tammy Wynette released on November 6, 1972, by Epic Records.

== Reception ==
Stephen Thomas Erlewine of AllMusic derides the album, calling it "overproduced, overwrought and under-written" and, while praising their rendition of Tom T. Hall's "Me and Jesus", laments that "the bombastic production gets a little nerve-wracking about halfway through the album, and by the end of the record the music hasn't provided much inspiration. In all, a wasted opportunity."

== Track listing ==
No.	Title	Writer(s)	Length
1.	"We Love to Sing About Jesus"	Earl Montgomery; Tammy Wynette	1:54
2.	"Old Fashioned Singing"	Montgomery; Wynette	2:50
3.	"He Is My Everything"	Dallas Frazier	2:17
4.	"Me and Jesus"	Tom T. Hall	3:14
5.	"Noah and the Ark"	Jenny Strickland; Carmol Taylor	2:26
6.	"Let's All Go Down to the River"	Montgomery; Sue Richards	2:35
7.	"Let's All Sing Ourselves to Glory"	Montgomery	2:25
8.	"Talkin' About Jesus"	Montgomery	2:25
9.	"When Jesus Takes His Children Home"	Duke Goff; Mark Sherrill	1:46
10.	"Everything's Gonna Be Alright"	Taylor; Agnes Wilson	1:52
11.	"Show Him That You Love Him"	Montgomery	1:54

== Charting Singles ==
Single	Chart	Peak position
Old Fashioned Singing	U.S. Billboard Hot Country Singles	38
