= Show Me (Joe Tex song) =

1967 single by Joe Tex

Single by Joe Tex
- B-side: "A Woman Sees a Hard Time (When Her Man Is Gone)"
- Released: March 1967
- Recorded: February 1, 1967
- Genre: Soul
- Length: 2:53
- Label: Dial
- Songwriter: Joe Tex
- Producer: Buddy Killen

"Show Me" is a title track of the 1967 album by Joe Tex, who also wrote the song. The single was Joe Tex's fourteenth release to make the US R&B chart. "Show Me" went to #24 on the R&B chart and #35 on the Hot 100.

== Cover versions ==
- In 1967, Checkmates, Ltd. released a version of the song on their debut album, Live! At Caesar's Palace.
- In 1969, The Foundations covered the song which appears on their album From the Foundations.
- In 1969, Lulu recorded a cover that was included in her Lulu's Album release.
- In 1972, Barbara Mandrell recorded the song for her album The Midnight Oil. Her version peaked at #11 on the Hot Country Singles chart.
- In 1976, Eddie and the Hot Rods released a version of the song on their album Teenage Depression.
- The Lightnin 3 (Rosemary Standley, Brisa Roché and Ndidi Onukwulu) recorded this song on their unique album (discogs link) published in 2012.
- In 2017, Ronnie Baker Brooks recorded the song. His cover was included on his Times Have Changed release.

== Personnel ==
- Clarence Hadley (bass)
- Lee Royal Hadley (guitar)
- Clyde Williams (drums)
- Emile Hall (trumpet)
