= The Ceremony (song) =

Single by George Jones and Tammy Wynette

from the album Me and the First Lady
- B-side: "The Great Divide"
- Released: June 7, 1972
- Recorded: 1972
- Genre: Country
- Length: 2:58
- Label: Epic
- Songwriters: Billy Sherrill, Carmol Taylor, Jenny Strickland
- Producer: Billy Sherrill

George Jones and Tammy Wynette singles chronology
| "Take Me" (1971) | "The Ceremony" (1972) | "Old Fashion Singing" (1972) |

"The Ceremony" is a duet by country artists George Jones and Tammy Wynette. It was released by Epic Records as the married couple's second single together in 1972 and reached No. 6 on the Billboard country survey.

== Background ==
"The Ceremony" was co-written by producer Billy Sherrill, who immediately recognized the potential sales-wise in recording duets on George and Tammy. Wynette, who had enjoyed immense success recording at CBS with Sherrill, convinced Jones to cut ties with his mentor Pappy Daily and buy out his contract at Musicor so he could record with her at Epic. Their first single, "Take Me," had been a Top 10 hit, but Sherrill saw it as only the beginning:

"He knew that Tammy and George were now in the process of turning their celebrated romance into a country-music passion play. He knew they wanted to take their romantic road shows out to strange cities like Sioux City and Peoria, where they would perform for all the people who'd been reading in the tabloids and fan mags about their story-book love affair."

"The Ceremony" became the template for many of their early duets: romantic, occasionally overwrought Harlequin love songs that bubbled with optimism. The song mimics a wedding service, beginning with a minister's preamble over a church organ and containing verses where George and Tammy renew their vows and profess their love for each other. It became a highlight of their live shows, although Jones biographer Bob Allen wryly noted that when they sang "The Ceremony" onstage, it was "quite unlike the quickie civil ceremony with which they'd actually sealed their nuptial bond." In 1995, Jones reflected in his autobiography, "It sounds cheesy now, but it was a show-stopper for two people whose divorce was often the subject of tabloid speculation. People went crazy when we did 'The Ceremony' live."

== Chart performance ==
| Chart (1972) | Peak position |
|---|---|
| US Billboard Hot Country Singles | 6 |
| Canadian RPM Country Tracks | 3 |
