= Bedtime Story (Tammy Wynette song) =

- German release picture sleeve

Single by Tammy Wynette

from the album Bedtime Story
- B-side: "Reach Out Your Hand (And Touch Somebody)"
- Released: November 1971
- Genre: Country
- Length: 4:13
- Label: Epic
- Songwriters: Billy Sherrill; Glenn Sutton
- Producer: Billy Sherrill

Tammy Wynette singles chronology
"Good Lovin' (Makes It Right)" (1971)	"Bedtime Story" (1971)	"Reach Out Your Hand (And Touch Somebody)" (1972)

"Bedtime Story" is a song written by Billy Sherrill and Glenn Sutton, and recorded by American country music artist Tammy Wynette. It was released in November 1971 as the first single and title track from the album Bedtime Story. The song was Wynette's eleventh number one on the country charts spending one week at the top and a total of thirteen weeks on the country charts.

== Charts ==
=== Weekly charts ===
Chart (1971–1972)	Peak position
US Billboard Hot 100	86
US Hot Country Songs (Billboard)	1
Canadian RPM Country Tracks	1

=== Year-end charts ===
Chart (1972)	Position
US Hot Country Songs (Billboard)	30
