= (We're Not) The Jet Set =

Single by George Jones & Tammy Wynette

from the album We're Gonna Hold On
- B-side: "Crawdad Song"
- Released: 1974
- Recorded: 1973
- Genre: Country
- Length: 2:26
- Label: Epic
- Songwriter: Bobby Braddock
- Producer: Billy Sherrill

George Jones & Tammy Wynette singles chronology
"We're Gonna Hold On" (1973)	"(We're Not) The Jet Set" (1974)	"We Loved It Away" (1974)

"(We're Not) The Jet Set" is a song recorded by country music duo George Jones and Tammy Wynette. It was written by country songwriter Bobby Braddock.

== Chart performance ==
Chart (1974)	Peak position
U.S. Billboard Hot Country Singles	15
Canadian RPM Country Tracks	16
