= Take Me (George Jones song) =

Single by George Jones

from the album Love Bug
- B-side: "Ship of Love"
- Released: 1965
- Recorded: 1965
- Genre: Country
- Length: 2:43
- Label: Musicor
- Songwriters: George Jones, Leon Payne
- Producer: Pappy Daily

George Jones singles chronology
"Love Bug" (1965)	"Take Me" (1965)	"I'm a People" (1966)

"Take Me"

Single by George Jones and Tammy Wynette

from the album We Go Together
- B-side: "We Go Together"
- Released: 1971
- Recorded: 1971
- Genre: Country
- Length: 2:21
- Label: Epic
- Songwriters: George Jones, Leon Payne
- Producer: Billy Sherrill

George Jones and Tammy Wynette singles chronology
"Take Me" (1971)	"The Ceremony" (1972)

"Take Me" is a song written by George Jones and Leon Payne. Jones originally released the song on the Musicor label in 1966 and scored a No. 8 hit. However, the song is best remembered for being the first single release by Jones and his third wife Tammy Wynette in 1971 on Epic Records. That version was also a top ten hit, peaking at No. 9.

== Recording and composition ==
Jones wrote "Take Me" with Leon Payne, who is perhaps best known for his hits "I Love You Because", "You've Still Got a Place in My Heart", and for the two songs of his Hank Williams recorded: "Lost Highway" and "They'll Never Take Her Love from Me". In his autobiography I Lived to Tell It All, Jones recalled, "When I was at Musicor, I might record an entire album in three hours, a practice that violated the musician's union's rules. I'd go through one take...Yet I recorded some of my biggest songs in that casual fashion, including 'Take Me'..."

== Tammy Wynette ==
The song took on a whole new poignancy when Jones cut it with his third wife, country star Tammy Wynette. Although Jones and Wynette had been married since 1969 and had toured together for years, they had not been able to record together due to record contract constraints, although Tammy had sung backup on a handful of George's songs while he was on the Musicor label and had even appeared on the cover of his 1969 LP I'll Share My World with You. Jones eventually broke his contract with Musicor at a hefty sum so he could join Tammy at Epic Records and record with her producer Billy Sherrill. "Take Me" became the couple's first single release together and climbed to No. 9, kicking off a remarkable run for the duo that would last beyond their divorce in 1975. In the liner notes to the 2005 Sony reissue of My Very Special Guests, Jones is quoted, "When we first started doing duets, she had a hard time following me because I don't open my mouth much when I sing. She had to learn to read my lips!" Jones performed the song with Shelby Lynne at the George Jones and Friends: 50th Anniversary Concert in 2007.

While appearing on Charlie Rose with Alison Krauss and T-Bone Burnett to promote the album Raising Sand, former Led Zeppelin vocalist Robert Plant spoke of being overwhelmed when he had recently heard the duet version of "Take Me" for the first time, with Burnett adding, "George Jones and Tammy Wynette doing 'Take Me' is sublime. That's about as good as music gets."
