= We're Gonna Hold On (song) =

Single by George Jones and Tammy Wynette

from the album We're Gonna Hold On
- B-side: "My Elusive Dreams"
- Released: August 1973
- Genre: Country
- Label: Epic
- Songwriters: George Jones; Earl Montgomery
- Producer: Billy Sherrill

George Jones and Tammy Wynette singles chronology
| "Let's Build a World Together" (1973) | "We're Gonna Hold On" (1973) | "(We're Not) the Jet Set" (1974) |

"We're Gonna Hold On" is a 1973 duet single by George Jones and Tammy Wynette. The duo, who were a married couple at the time, had their first of three number-one songs on the U.S. country chart. "We're Gonna Hold On" was the most successful of these releases spending fourteen weeks on the chart. George Jones co-wrote the song with Earl Montgomery.

== Background ==
The song was released not long after the couple's reconciliation after Tammy filed for divorce on August 1, 1973 due to George's increasing bouts of drunkenness. Like many of their songs, "We're Gonna Hold On" seemed to mirror their stormy marriage, with Jones telling Music City News in 1973, "I was tired of waking up sick and having people talk about me - having my wife and children mad at me...I just looked at the situation and realized all the pain I was causing and all the pain I was suffering wasn't worth it. We love each other very much." According to Jones' biographer Bob Allen, Earl "Peanutt" Montgomery was inspired to write the song from a title suggested by Jones and his own sense of shame; while on tour with George and Tammy in Pennsylvania, he had gotten drunk in the lounge of a Holiday Inn where they were staying and had charged all his drinks to Tammy's room. It was the first #1 for Jones since 1967. The pair would promote the single extensively with several television appearances, including one on The Midnight Special.

== Chart performance ==
| Chart (1973) | Peak position |
|---|---|
| U.S. Billboard Hot Country Singles | 1 |
| Canadian RPM Country Tracks | 2 |
