= Two Story House =

Single by George Jones and Tammy Wynette

from the album Together Again
- B-side: "It Sure Was Good"
- Released: February 1980
- Genre: Country
- Label: Epic
- Songwriter(s): David Lindsey; Glenn Douglas Tubb; Tammy Wynette
- Producer(s): Billy Sherrill

George Jones singles chronology
"You Can Have Her" (1979)	"Two Story House" (1980)	"He Stopped Loving Her Today" (1980)

Tammy Wynette singles chronology
"No One Else in the World" (1979)	"Two Story House" (1980)	"He Was There (When I Needed You)" (1980)

"Two Story House" is a song recorded American country music artists George Jones and Tammy Wynette. It was released in February 1980 as the first single from their album Together Again. The song reached #2 on the Billboard Hot Country Singles chart and #1 on the RPM Country Tracks chart in Canada.

== Recording and composition ==
Wynette wrote the song with David Lindsey and Glenn Douglas Tubb. The song's lyrics – a couple buying a "two-story house" - are a metaphor for a failed marriage. A young couple reflects on working hard to achieve the dream of owning a large two-story house but, in working to achieve the goal, they rarely are able to spend time together to consummate their love. When it comes time to make the move, the couple becomes the envy of their neighbors and the house is quickly filled with such things as rare antiques, marble floors, chandeliers and more...but the most important element – love between the couple – is missing. The background vocals were sung by The Jordanaires. Tammy and George, who divorced bitterly in 1975, performed the song together on the Jones HBO television special With a Little Help From My Friends in 1980.

In 2012, the recording was used in a television commercial for GMC trucks.

Part of the song's verses borrow the tune of The Itsy-Bitsy Spider.

== Historic week ==
"Two Story House" was part of a historic week on the Billboard Hot Country Singles chart in the week it reached No. 5 for the week ending April 19, 1980. That week, all of the top five positions were held by female singers. The Top 5 from that week was:

1. "It's Like We Never Said Goodbye" by Crystal Gayle
2. "A Lesson in Leavin'" by Dottie West
3. "Are You on the Road to Lovin' Me Again" by Debby Boone
4. "Beneath Still Waters" by Emmylou Harris
5. "Two Story House" by Tammy Wynette (duet with George Jones)

== Chart performance ==
Chart (1980)	Peak position
US Hot Country Songs (Billboard)	2
Canadian RPM Country Tracks	1
