= Golden Ring (song) =

Single by George Jones and Tammy Wynette

from the album Golden Ring
- B-side: "We're Putting It Back Together"
- Released: May 1976
- Recorded: 1976
- Genre: Country
- Length: 3:02
- Label: Epic
- Songwriters: Bobby Braddock, Rafe Van Hoy
- Producer: Billy Sherrill

George Jones and Tammy Wynette singles chronology
"God's Gonna Get'cha (For That)" (1975)	"Golden Ring" (1976)	"Near You" (1976)

"Golden Ring" is a song written by Bobby Braddock and Rafe Van Hoy, and recorded by American country music singers George Jones and Tammy Wynette. It was released in May 1976 as the first single and title track to their duet album of the same name. It was a number-one hit on the Billboard country chart.

== Recording and composition ==
The song was conceived by songwriter Bobby Braddock, who had seen a television film called The Gun about the life of a handgun. The story showed the gun changing hands several times, with a hunter, police officer, a criminal, and a father of a 2-year-old child all owning the gun at one point, with the consequences played out in each segment. Braddock applied the same concept to a song about the life of a wedding ring.

In the song, a young couple from Chicago - apparently very much in love - goes to a pawn shop to shop for a ring for their upcoming wedding. The man (both characters are unnamed in the song) laments that he is unable to pick out a more expensive band, but he is willing to buy it to show how much he loves his bride-to-be, whom - in the song's second verse - he marries in a small wedding chapel later on that afternoon. In the third verse, the couple has been fighting and, with the marriage clearly in trouble, the man accuses his wife of planning to leave town. Shortly afterward, the woman retorts by telling her husband that she does not love him anymore, throws the ring down and leaves. The final verse features the ring, once again in a pawn shop, waiting for its next owners.

The refrains tell about the meaning of the ring through its life cycle with the couple. The first refrain speaks of the promise of love shown in the glittering ring; the second verse talks about how "at last, it's found a home", and the finale tells of how the ring has been cast aside "like the love that's dead and gone". Each refrain ends with how a wedding band is meaningless without love ("By itself, it's just a cold metallic thing / Only love can make a golden wedding ring").

According to Rich Kienzle's essay for the 1994 Sony compilation The Essential George Jones: The Spirit of Country, the recording features Pete Wade and Jerry Kennedy on acoustic guitars and drummer Jerry Carrigan playing a snare drum with his hands, as instructed by producer Billy Sherrill. Released in May 1976 – 14 months after their real-life divorce – "Golden Ring" was the second George Jones-Tammy Wynette duet to reach No. 1 on the Billboard Hot Country Singles chart that August. With its tale of a young couple's engagement, marriage, and bitter break-up, the song is arguably the one that is most closely identified with Jones and Wynette, whose tumultuous six-year marriage had ended in bitter recrimination. Country audiences, however, remained more fascinated with the couple than ever, with Eugene Chadbourne of AllMusic observing, "The chemistry that develops between partners in a male and female country music duo can sometimes be based on fantasy, as was obviously the case with Loretta Lynn and Ernest Tubb, who no country listener even imagined for a moment were romantically involved. Tammy Wynette and George Jones, on the other hand, did have a relationship."

Like many of the duets that the two recorded when they were still husband and wife, "Golden Ring" resonated with an authentic sense of romantic tragedy and irresolution that was hauntingly similar to the real-life timbre of their troubled, on-again-off-again love affair. Jones, who at the time made no secret of the fact that he still carried a torch for his ex-wife, later addressed the issue of re-teaming with Wynette in his 1996 memoir by insisting, "That wasn't my idea. In fact, I hated to work with her. It brought back too many unpleasant memories, and when some fans saw us together, they got it in their heads that we were going to get back together romantically." It was precisely this romantic titillation that sparked their record sales, however, and they would record again at various times throughout the rest of the decade.

Jones and Wynette re-recorded the song on Jones's 1994 album The Bradley Barn Sessions, an album which comprised re-recordings of Jones's material in duet form. A cover version was recorded by Jason Sellers as a duet with Pam Tillis on Sellers' 1998 album A Matter of Time. It has also been recorded by the Dry Branch Fire Squad bluegrass band. Ashton Shepherd and Daryle Singletary also covered it for Ashton's third album "This Is America" (2013).

== Critical reception ==
In 2024, Rolling Stone ranked the song at #63 on its 200 Greatest Country Songs of All Time ranking.

== Charts ==
Chart (1976)	Peak position
US Hot Country Songs (Billboard)	1
Canadian RPM Country Tracks	5

== Cover versions ==
"Golden Ring" was covered by Jason Sellers and Pam Tillis. The song was included on Sellers' 1999 LP A Matter of Time.
