= George Richey =

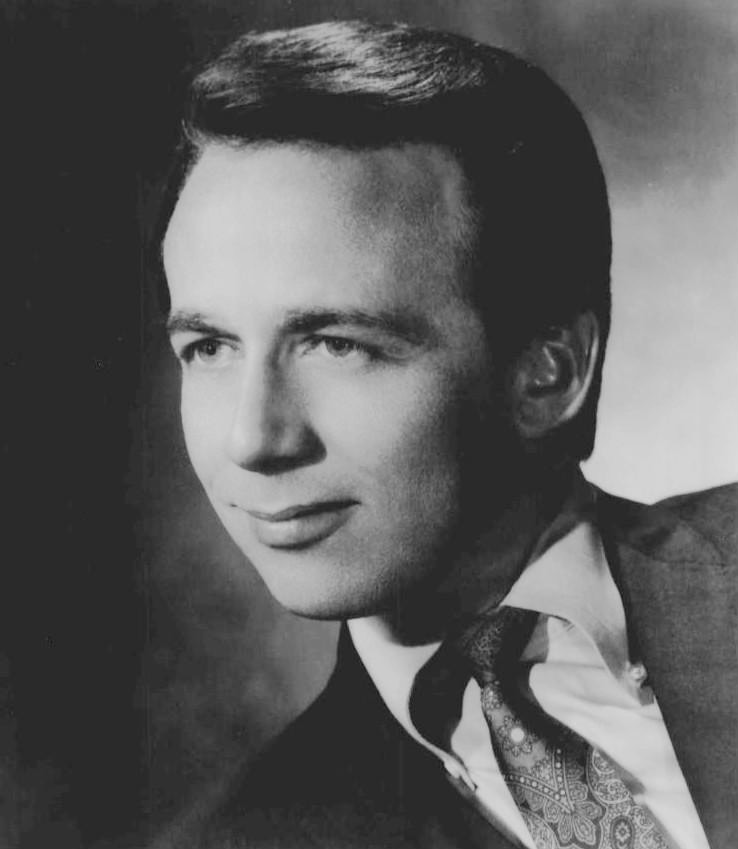
- Richey in 1967.
- Born: George Baker Richardson; November 30, 1935; Promise Land, Arkansas, US
- Died: July 31, 2010 (aged 74); Nashville, Tennessee, US
- Spouses: Dorothy Ann Tippit (m. 1953; div. 1969); Sheila Hall (m. 1974; div. 1977); Tammy Wynette (m. 1978; died 1998); Sheila Slaughter (m. 2001)
- Children: 3
- Musical career
- Genre: Country
- Occupations: Songwriter, producer, session musician
- Instrument: Piano
- Years active: 1960s–1990s

George Richey (born George Baker Richardson; November 30, 1935 – July 31, 2010) was an American songwriter and record producer. He was born in Promise Land, Arkansas, as was his songwriting brother, Paul Richey, but raised in Malden, Missouri.

== Career ==
Richey was a mainstay of the Nashville country music community since the 1960s through his songwriting and record production. In the 1970s, he co-wrote "Keep Me in Mind," a No. 1 country hit for Lynn Anderson in 1973. He also co-wrote hits for future wife Tammy Wynette and Wynette's then-husband, George Jones, including Jones's "A Picture of Me (Without You)" and "The Grand Tour," and Wynette's "'Til I Can Make It On My Own" and "You and Me", among many other artists. Richey served as a session musician for recordings by Marty Robbins, Ringo Starr and Lefty Frizzell.

Richey served as the musical director for the television show Hee Haw from 1970 to 1977.

While married to Wynette, he was her full-time manager, producer and songwriter. Following her death in 1998, he largely retreated from public life.

== Personal life ==
In 1953, Richey married Dorothy Ann Tippit. While together, they had two children, Kelly and Diedre. Richey and Tippit divorced in 1969. In 1974, he married Sheila Hall. In 1977, Hall filed for divorce on the grounds of "cruel and inhuman treatment", which she later withdrew. Hall would again file for divorce in October 1977 after learning that Richey was having an affair with Tammy Wynette.

=== Marriage to Tammy Wynette ===
George Richey and Tammy Wynette married on July 6, 1978. Richey then became Wynette's full-time manager and also took control of her finances. Georgette Jones, Wynette's daughter by former husband, George Jones, has claimed that Richey attempted to keep Wynette away from her children and close friends. She also claims that Richey was abusive to Wynette for the duration of their marriage. Georgette Jones, and another of Wynette's daughters, Jackie Daly, both claimed that Wynette admitted that her infamous kidnapping incident was staged in order to explain bruises from a beating from Richey.

On April 5, 1998, Wynette felt a burning in her leg. Richey called her doctor, Wallis Marsh, who was 500 miles away in Pittsburgh. Marsh urged Richey to take her to the emergency room, but Richey did not. She died in her sleep the following afternoon. Richey would later claim that Wynette didn't want to be taken to a hospital, as she had started feeling better.

=== After Wynette's death ===
In April 1999, Wynette's daughters Tina, Jackie and Georgette filed a $50 million wrongful death lawsuit against Richey and Marsh after local reporter, Jennifer Kraus, discovered that Midazolam had been shipped to Wynette. Richey subsequently allowed for an autopsy to be performed on Wynette. No cause of death was determined, with no Midazolam found in Wynette's body. Richey was later dropped from the lawsuit.

In 2001, Richey married former Dallas Cowboys cheerleader and television producer Sheila Slaughter. They had a daughter, Tatum Keys, and remained married until Richey's death.

=== Death ===
Richey, a long-time smoker, died on July 31, 2010, following a long battle with chronic obstructive pulmonary disease. There was no public memorial, per his request, and he was buried in Nashville near Wynette. His death was kept private for over three weeks, with his Facebook page continuing to add new posts post-mortem, initially leading to confusion about his death.

== In popular culture ==
He is portrayed by Steve Zahn in the 2022 television miniseries George & Tammy.
