= Bobby Braddock =

American singer-songwriter (born 1940)

- Born: Robert Valentine Braddock; August 5, 1940 (age 86); Lakeland, Florida
- Genre: Country
- Occupation: songwriter
- Instruments: Piano, saxophone

Robert Valentine Braddock (born August 5, 1940) is an American country songwriter and record producer. A member of the Country Music Hall of Fame and the Nashville Songwriters Hall of Fame, Braddock has contributed numerous hit songs during more than 40 years in the industry, including 13 number-one hit singles.

== Early years ==
Braddock was born in Lakeland, Florida, to a father who was a citrus grower. Braddock spent his youth in Auburndale, Florida, where he learned to play piano and saxophone. The musician toured Florida and the South with rock and roll bands in the late 1950s and early 1960s. At the age of 24, Braddock moved to Nashville, Tennessee, to pursue a career in country music.

== Musical success ==
After arriving in Nashville, Braddock joined Marty Robbins' band as a pianist in February 1965. In January of the next year, a song he wrote for Robbins, "While You're Dancing", became Braddock's first record to appear on the charts. He then signed his first of five recording contracts with major record labels and a publishing contract with Tree Publishing Company, now Sony BMG. Braddock quickly established himself as a bankable songwriter, penning songs in the 1970s for such artists as the Statler Brothers, Tammy Wynette, George Jones, Nancy Sinatra, Johnny Duncan, Willie Nelson, Tanya Tucker, Jerry Lee Lewis, and Tommy Overstreet.

Braddock continued his successful songwriting career well into the 21st century, writing songs recorded by artists including Lacy J. Dalton, T.G. Sheppard, John Anderson, Mark Chesnutt, and Tracy Lawrence. Braddock sometimes co-wrote songs with Curly Putman or Sonny Throckmorton, fellow members of the Nashville Songwriters Hall of Fame.

As a producer, Braddock's greatest success thus far is the discovery of country singer Blake Shelton, securing a recording deal in 2001. Braddock is credited as producer for several of Shelton's number-one country hits, including his debut single "Austin", which spent five weeks at the top of the charts.

Also in 2001, Braddock penned the song "I Wanna Talk About Me", intended for Shelton, but eventually recorded by Toby Keith. The song topped the Billboard country charts for five weeks in 2002.

Braddock currently resides in Nashville and continues to write songs for the publishing company Sony/ATV.

In July 2017, Braddock was featured in an episode of Malcolm Gladwell 's podcast, Revisionist History, which analyzed the emotional appeal of country music relative to other genres. Gladwell dubbed Braddock the "King of Tears".

=== Books ===
In 2007, Braddock published a memoir recounting his early life in pre-Disney World Central Florida, titled Down in Orburndale: A Songwriters Youth in Old Florida.

In 2015, Vanderbilt University Press published Bobby Braddock: A Life on Nashville's Music Row, a second memoir of Braddock's tumultuous career in Nashville's music industry. The book was aided by 85 of the author's personal journals going back as far as 1971.

== Awards and recognition ==
- The George Jones classic, "He Stopped Loving Her Today", which Braddock co-wrote with Curly Putman, won the Country Music Association Song of the Year award two years in a row (1980 and 1981) and the 1981 Song of the Year from the Academy of Country Music. This song was voted Country Song of the Century in a poll by Radio & Records magazine, as well as Best Country Song of All Time in a poll conducted by the BBC and Country America magazine.
- 1981 Music City News Songwriter of the Year
- 1981 Nashville Songwriters Association Song of the Year
- 1981 Inductee into the Nashville Songwriters Hall of Fame
- 2011 Inductee into the Country Music Hall of Fame.

== Songwriting ==
Songs Braddock wrote or co-wrote that made the Billboard country singles chart include:

Title	Artist(s)	Hit Year	Billboard Peak
"Ruthless"	The Statler Brothers	1967	10
"You Can't Have Your Kate and Edith Too"	The Statler Brothers	1967	14
"Country Music Lover"	Little Jimmy Dickens	1967	23
"D-I-V-O-R-C-E"	Tammy Wynette	1968	1
"Ballad of Two Brothers"	Autry Inman	1968	14
"Something to Brag About"	Charlie Louvin and Melba Montgomery	1970	18
"Did You Ever"	Charlie Louvin and Melba Montgomery	1971	26
"Nothing Ever Hurt Me (Half as Bad as Losing You)"	George Jones	1973	7
"(We're Not) The Jet Set"	George Jones and Tammy Wynette	1974	15
"I Believe the South is Gonna Rise Again"	Tanya Tucker	1975	18
"Golden Ring"	George Jones and Tammy Wynette	1976	1
"Thinkin' of a Rendezvous"	Johnny Duncan	1976	1
"Her Name Is..."	George Jones	1976	3
"Peanuts and Diamonds"	Bill Anderson	1976	10
"Something to Brag About"	Mary Kay Place with Willie Nelson	1977	9
"Womanhood"	Tammy Wynette	1978	3
"Come on In"	Jerry Lee Lewis	1978	10
"Fadin' In, Fadin' Out"	Tommy Overstreet	1978	11
"Georgia in a Jug"	Johnny Paycheck	1978	17
"They Call It Making Love"	Tammy Wynette	1979	6
"He Stopped Loving Her Today"	George Jones	1980	1
"I Feel Like Loving You Again"	T.G. Sheppard	1980	1
"Hard Times"	Lacy J. Dalton	1980	7
"Would You Catch a Falling Star"	John Anderson	1982	6
"Faking Love"	T.G. Sheppard and Karen Brooks	1983	1
"I Don't Remember Loving You"	John Conlee	1983	10
"Old Flames Have New Names"	Mark Chesnutt	1992	5
"Texas Tornado"	Tracy Lawrence	1995	1
"Time Marches On"	Tracy Lawrence	1996	1
"I Wanna Talk About Me"	Toby Keith	2001	1
"People Are Crazy"	Billy Currington	2009	1

== Albums ==
- Between the Lines 1979
- Love Bomb 1980
- Hardpore Cornography 1983

== Singles ==
Year	Single	Chart Positions
Year	Single	US Country
1967	"I Know How to Do It"	74
1969	"The Girls in Country Music"	62
1979	"Between the Lines"	58
1980	"Nag, Nag, Nag"	87
