= Uncle Kracker discography =

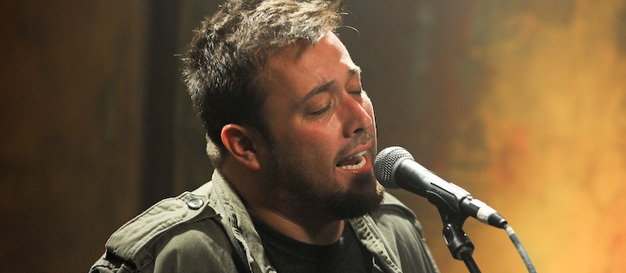
Uncle Kracker in 2012

This is the discography for American musician Uncle Kracker.

== Albums ==
=== Studio albums ===
| Title | Album details | Peak chart positions | | | | | | | | | | Certifications (sales threshold) |
| Title | Album details | US | US Rock | AUS | AUT | GER | NOR | NZ | SWE | SWI | UK | Certifications (sales threshold) |
|---|---|---|---|---|---|---|---|---|---|---|---|---|
| Double Wide | Release date: June 30, 2000; Label: Lava; Formats: CD, cassette | 7 | — | 15 | 5 | 3 | 26 | 21 | 16 | 13 | 40 | RIAA: 2× Platinum; ARIA: Gold; MC: Platinum |
| No Stranger to Shame | Release date: August 27, 2002; Label: Lava; Formats: CD | 43 | — | — | 70 | 92 | — | — | — | — | — | RIAA: Gold |
| Seventy Two and Sunny | Release date: June 29, 2004; Label: Lava; Formats: CD, music download | 39 | — | — | — | — | — | — | — | — | — | |
| Happy Hour | Release date: September 15, 2009; Label: Atlantic; Formats: CD, music download | 38 | 13 | — | — | — | — | — | — | — | — | |
| Midnight Special^{[A]} | Release date: November 16, 2012; Label: Sugar Hill; Formats: Vinyl, CD, music download | — | — | — | — | — | — | — | — | — | — | |
| Coffee & Beer | Release date: July 12, 2024; Label: Sturgeon General; Formats: Music download | — | — | — | — | — | — | — | — | — | — | |
"—" denotes releases that did not chart or were not released to that country

Notes

- A Midnight Special peaked at number 33 on the Billboard Top Country Albums chart and number 16 on the Billboard Independent Albums chart.

=== Compilation albums ===
| Title | Album details |
|---|---|
| An Introduction to Uncle Kracker | Released: 2018; Label: Rhino Entertainment; Formats: CD, music download |

== Extended plays ==
| Title | EP details | Peak chart positions | | |
| Title | EP details | US | US Country | US Rock |
|---|---|---|---|---|
| Happy Hour: The South River Road Sessions | Release date: June 22, 2010; Label: Atlantic; Formats: CD, music download | 66 | 9 | 17 |

== Singles ==
| Year | Title | Peak chart positions | | | | | | | | | | | Certifications (sales threshold) | Album |
| Year | Title | US | US AC | US Adult | US Country | US Pop | AUS | AUT | CAN | NZ | SWI | UK | Certifications (sales threshold) | Album |
|---|---|---|---|---|---|---|---|---|---|---|---|---|---|---|
| 2000 | "Follow Me" | 5 | 7 | 1 | — | 3 | 1 | 1 | 34 | 1 | 3 | 3 | ARIA: Platinum; BPI: Silver; BVMI: Gold; RMNZ: 3× Platinum | Double Wide |
| 2000 | "Yeah, Yeah, Yeah" | — | — | — | — | — | 23 | — | — | — | — | — | | Double Wide |
| 2002 | "In a Little While" | 59 | 26 | 4 | — | 28 | 88 | 39 | — | 18 | 37 | — | | No Stranger to Shame |
| 2003 | "Drift Away" (featuring Dobie Gray) | 9 | 1 | 2 | — | 10 | — | — | — | 25 | — | — | RMNZ: 2× Platinum | No Stranger to Shame |
| 2003 | "Memphis Soul Song" | — | — | 35 | — | — | — | — | — | — | — | — | | No Stranger to Shame |
| 2004 | "Rescue" | — | — | 20 | — | — | — | — | — | — | — | — | | Seventy Two and Sunny |
| 2004 | "Writing It Down" | — | — | — | — | — | — | — | — | — | — | — | | Seventy Two and Sunny |
| 2009 | "Smile" | 31 | 3 | 2 | 6 | 30 | 3 | 31 | 44 | 8 | — | — | RIAA: 3× Platinum; ARIA: Platinum; MC: Gold; RMNZ: Gold | Happy Hour |
| 2010 | "Good to Be Me" (featuring Kid Rock) | 113 | — | 29 | 28 | — | — | — | — | — | — | — | | Happy Hour |
| 2011 | "My Hometown" | — | — | — | 45 | — | — | — | — | — | — | — | | Non-album single |
| 2012 | "Nobody's Sad on a Saturday Night" | — | — | — | 42 | — | — | — | — | — | — | — | | Midnight Special |
| 2013 | "Blue Skies" | — | — | — | — | — | — | — | — | — | — | — | | Midnight Special |
| 2014 | "Endlessly" | — | — | — | — | — | — | — | — | — | — | — | | Non-album singles |
| 2018 | "Floatin'" | — | — | — | — (Note: "Floatin'" did not enter the Billboard Hot Country Songs chart, but peaked at number 48 on the Country Airplay chart.) | — | — | — | — | — | — | — | | Non-album singles |
| 2020 | "No Time to Be Sober" | — | — | — | — | — | — | — | — | — | — | — | | Non-album singles |
| 2023 | "Sweet 16" | — | — | — | — | — | — | — | — | — | — | — | | Coffee & Beer |
"—" denotes releases that did not chart or were not released to that country

== Featured singles ==
| Year | Single | Artist | Peak chart positions | | Certifications (sales threshold) | Album |
| Year | Single | Artist | US Country | US | Certifications (sales threshold) | Album |
|---|---|---|---|---|---|---|
| 2004 | "When the Sun Goes Down" | Kenny Chesney | 1 | 26 | US: 3× Platinum | When the Sun Goes Down |

== Videography ==
=== Music videos ===
| Year | Video | Director |
|---|---|---|
| 2000 | "Follow Me" | Nick Egan |
| 2000 | "Yeah, Yeah, Yeah" | Tom Dey |
| 2002 | "In a Little While" | Nick Quested |
| 2003 | "Memphis Soul Song" | Thom Oliphant |
| 2004 | "Rescue" | Trey Fanjoy |
| 2005 | "Writing It Down" | Shaun Silva |
| 2006 | "Drift Away" | Bronston Jones |
| 2008 | "Smile" | Darren Doane |
| 2009 | "My Girlfriend" | Darren Doane |
| 2010 | "Good to Be Me" (featuring Kid Rock) | Christopher Sims |
| 2012 | "Nobody's Sad on a Saturday Night" | Darren Doane |
| 2013 | "Blue Skies" | Eric Welch |
| 2018 | "Floatin'" | Jameson Stafford |

=== Guest appearances ===
| Year | Video | Director |
|---|---|---|
| 2004 | "When the Sun Goes Down" (with Kenny Chesney) | Shaun Silva |
