= List of Billboard Adult Contemporary number ones of 2003 =

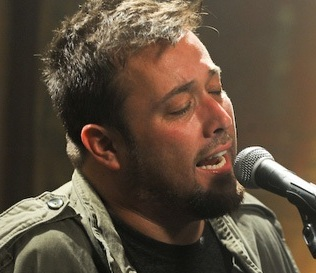
Uncle Kracker's cover version of "Drift Away" held the number one position for 23 consecutive weeks.

Adult Contemporary is a chart published by Billboard ranking the top-performing songs in the United States in the adult contemporary music (AC) market. In 2003, eight different songs topped the chart in 52 issues of the magazine, based on weekly airplay data from radio stations compiled by Nielsen Broadcast Data Systems.

In the first issue of Billboard of the new year, the number one song was Josh Groban's rendition of the 19th century Christmas song "O Holy Night", which was in its second week atop the chart. It held the top spot for a single week in 2003 before being replaced by "Cry" by the country singer Faith Hill. Five of the year's eight chart-toppers featured female vocalists, including "Beautiful", which gave pop singer Christina Aguilera her first AC number one. The song had been considered for release as the first single from Aguilera's album Stripped, but was passed over in favor of the uptempo, sexually charged song "Dirrty". When that single performed poorly, "Beautiful", a ballad with themes of personal acceptance and inner beauty, was released and went on to become one of the singer's signature tracks. None of 2003's AC number ones topped Billboard's all-genre chart, the Hot 100; Aguilera's "Beautiful" came the closest, peaking at number 2. In 2003 the top spot on the Hot 100 was almost exclusively occupied by R&B and hip hop acts such as Beyoncé and 50 Cent.

In the issue of Billboard dated June 7, Uncle Kracker reached the top spot on the AC listing with his rendition of "Drift Away", featuring additional vocals by Dobie Gray, who had achieved the biggest hit of his career with his version of the song in 1973. It was the first AC number one for Kracker, who had launched a solo career as a singer in 2000 after performing as the backing DJ for rap rock star Kid Rock. Released as the lead single from Kracker's second solo album No Stranger to Shame, his version of "Drift Away" topped the AC listing for 23 consecutive weeks, keeping it atop the chart into November. It would ultimately achieve a total of 28 weeks at number one, a new record for the AC chart which would stand until 2019 when it was broken by the band Maroon 5. Despite this level of success, however, it would prove to be Kracker's only AC number one. The year's final AC number one was "Unwell" by the band Matchbox Twenty.

== Chart history ==
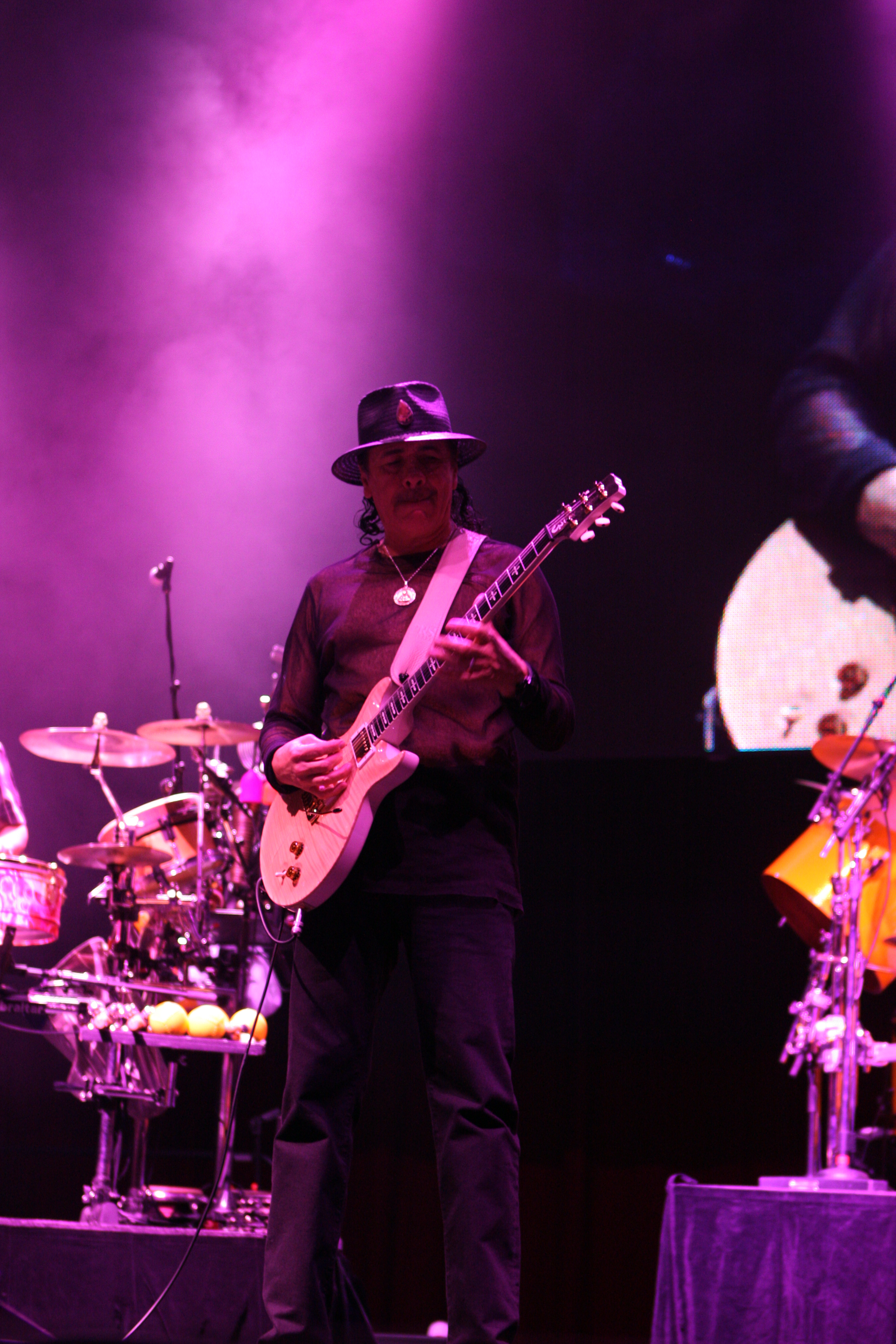
Santana (leader Carlos Santana pictured) had two spells at number one with "The Game of Love", featuring vocalist Michelle Branch.

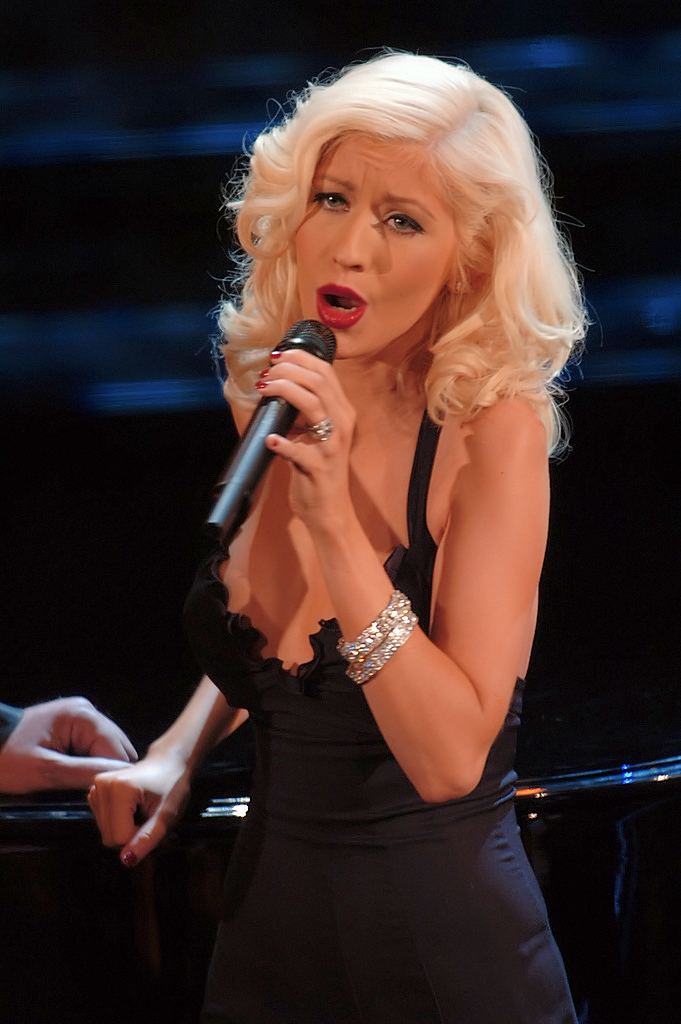
"Beautiful" was the first AC number one for Christina Aguilera.

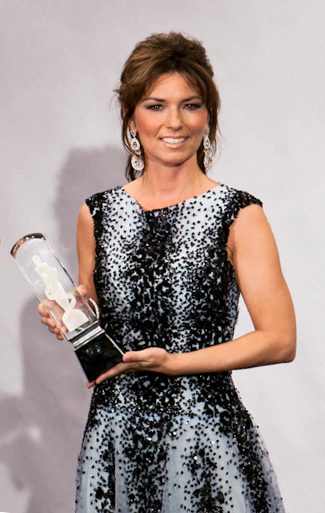
Shania Twain topped the chart with "Forever and for Always".

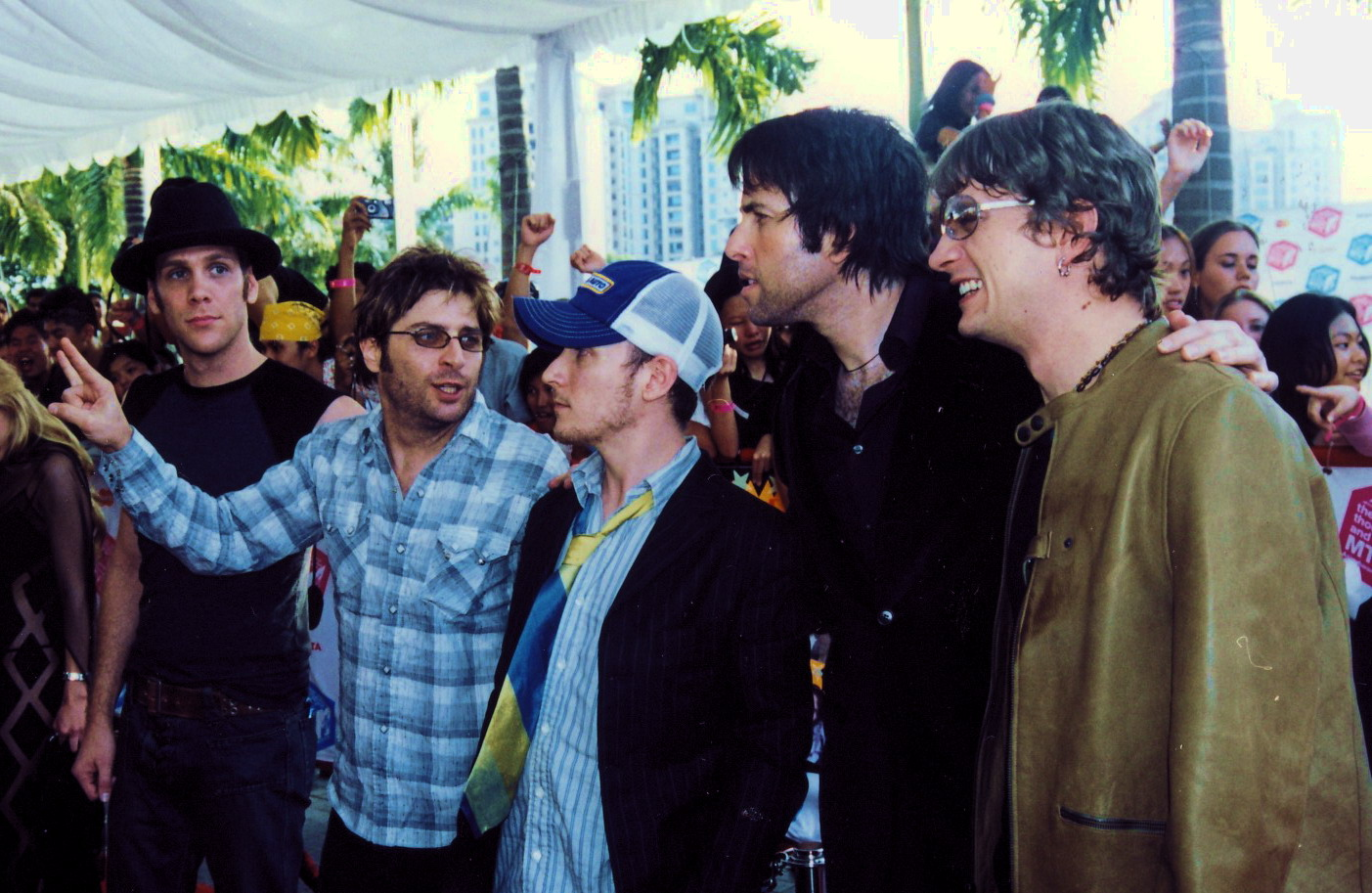
American rock band Matchbox Twenty ended the year at number one with their song “Unwell”

Issue date	Title	Artist(s)	Ref.
January 4	"O Holy Night"	Josh Groban	
January 11	"Cry"	Faith Hill	
January 18	"Cry"	Faith Hill	
January 25	"Cry"	Faith Hill	
February 1	"Cry"	Faith Hill	
February 8	"Cry"	Faith Hill	
February 15	"Landslide"	Dixie Chicks	
February 22	"Landslide"	Dixie Chicks	
March 1	"Landslide"	Dixie Chicks	
March 8	"Landslide"	Dixie Chicks	
March 15	"Landslide"	Dixie Chicks	
March 22	"Landslide"	Dixie Chicks	
March 29	"Landslide"	Dixie Chicks	
April 5	"The Game of Love"	Santana featuring Michelle Branch	
April 12	"The Game of Love"	Santana featuring Michelle Branch	
April 19	"Beautiful"	Christina Aguilera	
April 26	"Beautiful"	Christina Aguilera	
May 3	"Beautiful"	Christina Aguilera	
May 10	"Beautiful"	Christina Aguilera	
May 17	"Beautiful"	Christina Aguilera	
May 24	"The Game of Love"	Santana featuring Michelle Branch	
May 31	"The Game of Love"	Santana featuring Michelle Branch	
June 7	"Drift Away"	Uncle Kracker featuring Dobie Gray	
June 14	"Drift Away"	Uncle Kracker featuring Dobie Gray	
June 21	"Drift Away"	Uncle Kracker featuring Dobie Gray	
June 28	"Drift Away"	Uncle Kracker featuring Dobie Gray	
July 5	"Drift Away"	Uncle Kracker featuring Dobie Gray	
July 12	"Drift Away"	Uncle Kracker featuring Dobie Gray	
July 19	"Drift Away"	Uncle Kracker featuring Dobie Gray	
July 26	"Drift Away"	Uncle Kracker featuring Dobie Gray	
August 2	"Drift Away"	Uncle Kracker featuring Dobie Gray	
August 9	"Drift Away"	Uncle Kracker featuring Dobie Gray	
August 16	"Drift Away"	Uncle Kracker featuring Dobie Gray	
August 23	"Drift Away"	Uncle Kracker featuring Dobie Gray	
August 30	"Drift Away"	Uncle Kracker featuring Dobie Gray	
September 6	"Drift Away"	Uncle Kracker featuring Dobie Gray	
September 13	"Drift Away"	Uncle Kracker featuring Dobie Gray	
September 20	"Drift Away"	Uncle Kracker featuring Dobie Gray	
September 27	"Drift Away"	Uncle Kracker featuring Dobie Gray	
October 4	"Drift Away"	Uncle Kracker featuring Dobie Gray	
October 11	"Drift Away"	Uncle Kracker featuring Dobie Gray	
October 18	"Drift Away"	Uncle Kracker featuring Dobie Gray	
October 25	"Drift Away"	Uncle Kracker featuring Dobie Gray	
November 1	"Drift Away"	Uncle Kracker featuring Dobie Gray	
November 8	"Drift Away"	Uncle Kracker featuring Dobie Gray	
November 15	"Forever and for Always"	Shania Twain	
November 22	"Drift Away"	Uncle Kracker featuring Dobie Gray	
November 29	"Drift Away"	Uncle Kracker featuring Dobie Gray	
December 6	"Forever and for Always"	Shania Twain	
December 13	"Forever and for Always"	Shania Twain	
December 20	"Unwell"	Matchbox Twenty	
December 27	"Unwell"	Matchbox Twenty	

== See also ==
- 2003 in music
- List of artists who reached number one on the U.S. Adult Contemporary chart
