= Happy Hour: The South River Road Sessions =

EP by Uncle Kracker
- Released: June 22, 2010
- Genre: Country
- Length: 22:41
- Label: Atlantic; Top Dog
- Producer: Michael Bradford, Rob Cavallo, Kid Rock, Uncle Kracker

Uncle Kracker chronology
Happy Hour (2009)	Happy Hour: The South River Road Sessions (2010)	Midnight Special (2012)

Professional ratings
Review scores
Source	Rating
Allmusic	2.5/5 stars

Happy Hour: The South River Road Sessions is an EP by Uncle Kracker. It was released on June 22, 2010 under Atlantic Records. The EP features country versions of select tracks from Kracker's Happy Hour album released in 2009, and "Letter to My Daughters" from his second album No Stranger to Shame. South River Road is an actual road in Harrison Twp. MI where he grew up and attended high school. It has a review rating of 2.5.

== Track listing ==
No.	Title	Writer(s)	Length
1.	"Smile"	Jeremy Bose, Blair Daly, John T. Harding, Matthew Shafer	3:31
2.	"Good to Be Me" (featuring Kid Rock)	Harding, Brett James, Robert J. Ritchie, Shafer	4:01
3.	"Me Again" (featuring Jesse Lee)	Daly, Harding, Jesse Lee, Shafer	3:41
4.	"I'm Not Leaving"	Michael Bradford, Shafer	4:34
5.	"Livin' the Dream"	Josh Abraham, David Coverdale, Oliver Goldstein, Bernie Marsden, Shafer, Luke Walker	3:47
6.	"Letter to My Daughters"	David Allan Coe, Shafer	3:07

== Personnel ==
- Alex Al- bass guitar
- Herschel Boone- background vocals
- Mike Bradford- bass guitar, electric guitar, keyboards, string arrangements
- Dennis Caplinger- banjo, fiddle
- Chris Chaney- bass guitar
- Dan Chase- programming
- Sheryl Crow- background vocals on "Smile"
- Dorian Crozier- drums, percussion, programming
- George Doering- electric guitar
- Paul Franklin- pedal steel guitar
- Tommy Harden- drums
- James House- acoustic guitar
- Sean Hurley- bass guitar
- Kid Rock- programming and vocals on "Good To Be Me"
- Jesse Lee- vocals on "Me Again"
- Doug McKean- programming
- Jamie Muhoberac- keyboards
- Larry Paxton- upright bass
- Tim Pierce- electric guitar
- Gary Prim- piano
- Rae Rae- background vocals
- Marty Rifkin- dobro, pedal steel guitar
- Steve Stetson- drums
- Ty Stone- background vocals
- Russell Terrell- background vocals
- Neal Tiermann- acoustic guitar
- James Trombly- Hammond organ, piano
- Uncle Kracker- lead vocals
- Wanda Vick- dobro, fiddle, mandolin
- Marlon Young- bass guitar, acoustic guitar

== Chart performance ==
Chart (2010)	Peak position
U.S. Billboard 200	66
U.S. Billboard Country Albums	9
U.S. Billboard Rock Albums	17
