= John Henry Kurtz =

American songwriter and actor

- Born: October 24, 1945; Havertown, Pennsylvania, US
- Died: March 8, 2008 (aged 62) Cape May Court House, New Jersey, US
- Genre: Country rock
- Years active: 1970–1972 (as musician), 1986–2008 (as actor)
- Label: ABC Records

John Henry Kurtz (October 24, 1945 – March 8, 2008) was an American singer-songwriter and actor best known for recording an early version of the song "Drift Away", which was later popularized by Dobie Gray.

== Biography ==
John Henry Kurtz was born on October 24, 1945, in Havertown, Pennsylvania. He released his first and only studio album, Reunion, in 1972. The album contains "Drift Away", which was written by Mentor Williams. Though many sources cite Kurtz's version as the original, it was actually first recorded by English singer and actor Mike Berry two months earlier, appearing on his 1972 debut album of the same name.

While Kurtz's musical career was unsuccessful, he later turned to acting. He lived most of his life in Vail, Colorado, and moved to New York City in 1981. He also served in the U.S. Navy during the Vietnam era. A resident of Cape May, New Jersey, Kurtz died of cancer at Cape Regional Medical Center in Cape May, New Jersey on March 8, 2008.

== Filmography ==
=== Film ===
Year	Title	Role	Note
1994	The Cosby Mysteries	Mr. Poppy	TV movie
2006	Exiled	Newscaster	
2009	Frame of Mind	Man on the phone	Posthumous role

=== Television ===
Year	Title	Role	Note
1986–1994	Saturday Night Live	Announcer; The Global Warming Christmas Special Announcer; Colon Blow announcer; Dan Quayle: President narrator; Announcer: Pork commercials (voice)	5 episodes
1990	H.E.L.P.	Calwin	1 episode
1991	Law & Order	Pelletier	1 episode
1994	The Cosby Mysteries	Mr. Poppy	1 episode
1996	3rd Rock from the Sun	Voice Announcer	1 episode
2000–2004	Little Bill	TV Announcer; Newscaster; Baseball Announcer	3 episodes
2001	100 Centre Street	Hostage	1 episode
2007	Power, Privilege & Justice	Narrator	1 episode
