= 'Til I Can Make It on My Own (album) =

Studio album by Tammy Wynette
- Released: March 8, 1976
- Recorded: Dec. 1975
- Studio: Columbia (Nashville, Tennessee)
- Genre: Country
- Length: 28:24
- Label: Epic
- Producer: Billy Sherrill

Tammy Wynette chronology
I Still Believe in Fairy Tales (1975)	'Til I Can Make It on My Own (1976)	Golden Ring (1976)

Singles from 'Til I Can Make It on My Own
- 1. "'Til I Can Make It on My Own" Released: January 1976

Professional ratings
Review scores
Source	Rating
Allmusic	4/5 stars

'Til I Can Make It on My Own is the fifteenth studio album by American country music singer-songwriter Tammy Wynette. It was released on March 8, 1976, by Epic Records.

== Commercial performance ==
The album peaked at No. 3 on the Billboard Country Albums chart. The album's only single, "'Til I Can Make It on My Own", peaked at No. 1 on the Billboard Country Singles chart.

== Album Notes ==
"Easy Come, Easy Go" is a Dobie Gray cover from his 1975 album, New Ray of Sunshine. Wynette also recorded a completely different song also called "Easy Come, Easy Go" on her 1981 album, You Brought Me Back, which is a Mama Cass Elliot cover from her 1969 album, Bubblegum, Lemonade, and... Something for Mama.

== Track listing ==
Side one
No.	Title	Writer(s)	Length
1.	"'Til I Can Make It on My Own"	Billy Sherrill, George Richey, Tammy Wynette	3:00
2.	"Just in Case"	Hugh Moffatt	2:45
3.	"He's Just an Old Love Turned Memory"	John Schweers	2:52
4.	"The World's Most Broken Heart"	Fred Labour, Troy Seals	2:45
5.	"If I Could Only Win Your Love"	Charlie Louvin, Ira Louvin	2:12

Side two
No.	Title	Writer(s)	Length
1.	"The Heart"	Larry Gatlin	3:21
2.	"You Can Be Replaced"	Bill Anderson, Jerry Crutchfield	2:35
3.	"Love Is Something Good for Everybody"	Earl Montgomery	2:14
4.	"Where Some Good Love Has Been"	Max D. Barnes, Seals	3:14
5.	"Easy Come, Easy Go"	Barnes, Seals, Dobie Gray	3:26

== Personnel ==
Adapted from the album liner notes.

- Lou Bradley - engineer
- Billy Sherrill - producer
- Tammy Wynette - lead vocals

== Chart positions ==
=== Album ===
Year	Chart	Peak position
1976	Country Albums (Billboard)	3

=== Singles ===
Year	Single	Chart	Peak position
1976	"'Til I Can Make It on My Own"	Country Singles (Billboard)	1
