= 'Til I Can Make It on My Own =

1976 single by Tammy Wynette

Single by Tammy Wynette

from the album 'Til I Can Make It on My Own
- B-side: "Love Is Something Good for Everybody"
- Released: January 1976
- Recorded: December 15, 1975
- Studio: Columbia Recording, Nashville, Tennessee
- Genre: Country
- Length: 3:02
- Label: Epic 8-50196
- Songwriters: George Richey, Billy Sherrill, Tammy Wynette
- Producer: Billy Sherrill

Tammy Wynette singles chronology
"I Still Believe in Fairy Tales" (1975)	"'Til I Can Make It on My Own" (1976)	"Golden Ring" (1976)

"'Til I Can Make It on My Own"

Single by Kenny Rogers and Dottie West

from the album Classics
- B-side: "Midnight Flyer"
- Released: July 7, 1979
- Genre: Country
- Length: 3:17
- Label: Liberty
- Songwriters: George Richey, Billy Sherrill, Tammy Wynette
- Producer: Larry Butler

Kenny Rogers singles chronology
"She Believes in Me" (1979)	"'Til I Can Make It on My Own" (1979)	"You Decorated My Life" (1979)

Dottie West singles chronology
"All I Ever Need Is You" (1979)	"'Til I Can Make It on My Own" (1979)	"You Pick Me Up (And Put Me Down)" (1979)

"'Til I Can Make It on My Own" is a song co-written and first recorded by American country music artist Tammy Wynette. It was released in January 1976 as the first single and title track from the album 'Til I Can Make It on My Own. The song was Wynette's fifteenth number one on the country charts. The single stayed at number one for one week and spent a total of eleven weeks on the country charts. Wynette noted on multiple occasions that the song was her personal favorite of all that she had written or recorded, and it would remain a staple of her concerts for the remainder of her career. Wynette wrote the song with George Richey and Billy Sherrill.

== Cover versions ==
Kenny Rogers and Dottie West released their own version in July 1979 and took it up to #3 on the country charts. It was also covered by Billy Gilman on his 2000 album One Voice and by Martina McBride in 2005 on her Timeless album. Lulu Roman (of Hee Haw fame) released a cover on her 2013 album At Last featuring Georgette Jones (daughter of Tammy Wynette and George Jones) on harmony vocals. Georgette then released an album with this as the title track in 2013. Sam Williams and Carter Faith released a duet version in 2024 that subsequently appeared on Williams's EP Act I: Scarlet Lonesome.

== Charts ==
=== Tammy Wynette ===
Chart (1976)	Peak position
US Hot Country Songs (Billboard)	1
US Billboard Hot 100	84
US Adult Contemporary (Billboard)	41
Canadian RPM Country Tracks	1
Canadian RPM Adult Contemporary Tracks	37

=== Year-end charts ===
Chart (1976)	Position
US Hot Country Songs (Billboard)	23

=== Kenny Rogers and Dottie West ===
Chart (1979)	Peak position
US Hot Country Songs (Billboard)	3
Canadian RPM Country Tracks	1

=== Year-end charts ===
Chart (1979)	Position
US Hot Country Songs (Billboard)	42
