= Happy Hour (Uncle Kracker album) =

Studio album by Uncle Kracker
- Released: September 15, 2009
- Recorded: 2009
- Studios: Lightning Sound Studios (Hidden Hills, CA); Capitol Studios (Los Angeles, CA); The Allen Roadhouse (Clarkston, MI); Fresh Kills Music
- Genres: Alternative rock; country
- Length: 43:34
- Labels: Top Dog; Atlantic
- Producers: Rob Cavallo; Kid Rock; S*A*M and Sluggo

Uncle Kracker chronology
Seventy Two and Sunny (2004)	Happy Hour (2009)	Happy Hour: The South River Road Sessions (2010)

Singles from Happy Hour
- 1. "Smile" Released: July 13, 2009; 2. "Good to Be Me" Released: July 12, 2010

Happy Hour is the fourth studio album by American musician Uncle Kracker. It was released on September 15, 2009 via Top Dog and Atlantic Records. It is his final album on both labels. Production was handled by Rob Cavallo, except for "Good to Be Me", which was produced by Kid Rock, and "Hot Mess", which was produced by S*A*M and Sluggo.

The album peaked at number 38 on the Billboard 200 and number 13 on the Top Rock Albums in the United States. Its lead single, "Smile" made it to number 31 on the Billboard Hot 100.

== Critical reception ==
Professional ratings
Review scores
Source	Rating
AllMusic	2.5/5 stars
Entertainment Weekly	C+

Stephen Thomas Erlewine of AllMusic rated the album two-and-a-half stars out of five, saying "his attitude gets in his way, his party-hearty quips never jibing with his marshmallow music". Mikael Wood of Entertainment Weekly wrote: "Uncle Kracker's always believed in the power of positive thinking (or at least in the power of a case of Coors Light), so there's little here that hints at his recent troubles. Instead, you get smarmy frat-country jams about taking a seat at the corner bar and discovering that your girlfriend has a girlfriend now. On "Livin’ the Dream", he even comforts himself by quoting Whitesnake".

== Track listing ==
No.	Title	Writer(s)	Length
1.	"Smile"	Matthew Shafer; John Thomas Harding; Blair Daly; Jeremy Bose	3:21
2.	"Another Love Song"	Shafer; Michael Bradford; Mark McGuinn; Kevin Fish	3:32
3.	"My Girlfriend"	Shafer; Harding; Daly	3:00
4.	"Livin' the Dream"	Shafer; Josh Abraham; Luke Walker; Oliver Goldstein; David Coverdale; Bernie Marsden	3:45
5.	"Corner Bar"	Shafer; Martin "Tino" Gross	4:18
6.	"Me Again" (featuring Jesse Lee)	Shafer; Jessica Lee Levin; Harding; Daly	3:36
7.	"Good to Be Me"	Shafer; Harding; Robert James Ritchie; Brett James	4:12
8.	"I Hate California"	Shafer; James	3:38
9.	"Hot Mess"	Shafer; Sam Hollander; Dave Katz	2:52
10.	"Hey Hey Hey"	Shafer; Harding; Daly	3:29
11.	"I'm Not Leaving"	Shafer; Bradford	4:30
12.	"Mainstreet"	Robert Clark Seger	3:27
Total length:			43:34

iTunes Deluxe Edition
No.	Title	Writer(s)	Length
13.	"Celebrate"		3:40
14.	"Josephine"	Dave Bassett	3:29
15.	"Let Me Love You"		3:36
16.	"Smile" (Video)	Shafer; Harding; Daly; Bose	3:30

iTunes Deluxe Edition (Pre-Order Only)
No.	Title	Length
17.	"Happy Hour" (featuring Leo Sayer)	4:55

Outtakes

- "Vegas Baby" (featuring Mr. Hahn of Linkin Park) - 4:07
- "The One That Got Away" - 3:34
- "That's What's Happenin" - 3:37

== Personnel ==
- Matthew "Uncle Kracker" Shafer – main artist, vocals
- Jessica Lee "Jesse Lee" Levin – featured artist, vocals (track 6)
- Alfie Silas Durio – backing vocals
- Carmen Carter – backing vocals
- Clydene Jackson – backing vocals
- Rae Rae Jensen – backing vocals
- Ty Stone – backing vocals
- Herschel Boone – backing vocals (track 7)
- Dave Katz – backing vocals & programming (track 9)
- Sam Hollander – backing vocals & programming (track 9)
- Neal Tiemann – guitar
- Tim Pierce – guitar
- Marlon Young – acoustic guitar & bass (track 7)
- Sean Gould – guitar & engineering (track 9)
- Jamie Muhoberac – keyboards
- James "Jimmie Bones" Trombly – B3 electric piano (track 7)
- Ben Levels – organ (track 9)
- Alex Al – bass
- Chris Chaney – bass
- Michael Bradford – bass
- Paul Bushnell – bass
- Sean Hurley – bass
- Rashawn Ross – trumpet
- Dorian Crozier – percussion & programming
- Steve Stetson – drums (track 7)
- Dan Chase – programming
- Doug McKean – programming, engineering
- Mike Fasano – drum technician
- David Campbell – strings arranger (track 1)
- Rob Cavallo – producer
- Robert "Kid Rock" Ritchie – producer & programming (track 7)
- Jaime Neely – assistant producer
- Chris Lord-Alge – mixing
- Al Sutton – engineering & mixing (track 7)
- Lars Fox – Pro-Tools engineering
- Aaron Walk – engineering assistant
- Russ Waugh – engineering assistant
- Steve Rea – engineering assistant
- Andrew Schubert – additional mixing
- Brad Townsend – additional mixing
- Keith Armstrong – mixing assistant
- Nik Karpen – mixing assistant
- Ted Jensen – mastering
- Alex Kirzhner – art direction, design
- Chris Woehrle – design
- Kristie Borgmann – design
- Chapman Baehler – photography
- Craig Rosen – A&R
- Lesley Melincoff – A&R
- Pete Ganbarg – A&R
- Cheryl Jenets – product management
- Lee Trink – management
- Vera Salamone – management
- Chris Stang – marketing
- Thomas Valentino – legal
- Kyle Wilensky – booking
- Mitch Rose – booking
- Rick Roskin – booking

== Charts ==
Chart (2009)	Peak position
US Billboard 200	38
US Top Rock Albums (Billboard)	13
