= I Still Believe in Fairy Tales (song) =

Single by Tammy Wynette

from the album I Still Believe in Fairy Tales
- B-side: "You Memory Has Gone to Rest"
- Released: August 1975
- Recorded: June 1975
- Studio: Columbia (Nashville, Tennessee)
- Genre: Country
- Length: 2:20
- Label: Epic
- Songwriter(s): Grady Martin
- Producer(s): Billy Sherrill

Tammy Wynette singles chronology
"(You Make Me Want to Be a) Mother" (1975)	"I Still Believe in Fairy Tales" (1975)	"'Til I Can Make It on My Own" (1976)

"I Still Believe in Fairy Tales" is a song written by Grady Martin, and recorded by American country music artist Tammy Wynette. It was released in August 1975 as the first single and title track from the album I Still Believe in Fairy Tales.

== Background and reception ==
"I Still Believe in Fairy Tales" was first recorded in June 1975 at the Columbia Recording Studio in Nashville, Tennessee. Several additional tracks were also recorded at this session. The recording session was produced by Billy Sherrill, Wynette's long-time producer.

The song reached number 13 on the Billboard Hot Country Singles chart in 1975. It was Wynette's first solo single to not break through the top 10 on the Billboard country chart since 1967. The song was issued on Wynette's 1975 studio album of the same name.

== Track listings ==
7" vinyl single

- "I Still Believe in Fairy Tales" – 2:20
- "Your Memory's Gone to Rest" – 3:04

== Charts ==
=== Weekly charts ===
Chart (1975)	Peak position
US Hot Country Singles (Billboard)	13
