= In a Little While (Uncle Kracker song) =

2002 single by Uncle Kracker

Single by Uncle Kracker

from the album No Stranger to Shame
- B-side: "I Don't Know" (remix)
- Released: August 12, 2002
- Genre: Country
- Length: 4:10 (album version); 3:59 (radio version/edit)
- Label: Lava
- Songwriters: Matthew Shafer; Mike Bradford
- Producers: Kid Rock; Mike Bradford

Uncle Kracker singles chronology
"Yeah, Yeah, Yeah" (2001)	"In a Little While" (2002)	"Drift Away" (2003)

Music video
- "In a Little While" on YouTube

"In a Little While" is a song by American singer-songwriter Uncle Kracker from his second album, No Stranger to Shame (2002). It was released as a single on August 12, 2002, and peaked at number 59 on the US Billboard Hot 100. The single also entered the top 20 in Canada and New Zealand.

== Music video ==
The music video was directed by Nick Quested and premiered the week of August 26, 2002. American singer-songwriter Willa Ford makes an appearance.

== Track listing ==
European and Australian maxi-CD single

1. "In a Little While" (radio edit) – 3:59
2. "In a Little While" (album version) – 4:10
3. "I Don't Know" (remix) – 3:54

== Charts ==
=== Weekly charts ===
Chart (2002–2003)	Peak position
Australia (ARIA)	88
Austria (Ö3 Austria Top 40)	39
Canada CHR (Nielsen BDS)	14
Germany (GfK)	72
New Zealand (Recorded Music NZ)	18
Switzerland (Schweizer Hitparade)	37
US Billboard Hot 100	59
US Adult Contemporary (Billboard)	26
US Adult Pop Airplay (Billboard)	4
US Pop Airplay (Billboard)	28

=== Year-end charts ===
Chart (2002)	Position
US Adult Top 40 (Billboard)	37

Chart (2003)	Position
US Adult Top 40 (Billboard)	26

== Release history ==
Region	Date	Format(s)	Label(s)	Ref.
United States	August 12, 2002	Contemporary hit; hot adult contemporary radio	Lava	
Australia	August 26, 2002	CD	Lava	
United States	October 28, 2002	Adult contemporary radio	Lava	
