= Midnight Special (Uncle Kracker album) =

Studio album by Uncle Kracker
- Released: November 20, 2012
- Recorded: July–November 2012
- Genre: Country
- Length: 39:12
- Label: Sugar Hill Records
- Producer: Keith Stegall

Uncle Kracker chronology
Happy Hour: The South River Road Sessions (2010)	Midnight Special (2012)	Coffee & Beer (2024)

Singles from Midnight Special
- 1. "Nobody's Sad on a Saturday Night" Released: October 8, 2012; 2. "Blue Skies" Released: July 15, 2013

Professional ratings
Review scores
Source	Rating
Allmusic	3/5 stars
Roughstock	4/5 stars

Midnight Special is the fifth studio album by Uncle Kracker, released on November 20, 2012, under Sugar Hill Records. It his first full-length country album and his first not to involve Kid Rock in any capacity.

== Track listing ==
No.	Title	Writer(s)	Length
1.	"You Got That Thang"	J. T. Harding, Matthew Shafer	3:49
2.	"I'd Be There"	Harding, Shafer	3:12
3.	"Four Letter Word"	Shafer	3:39
4.	"Blue Skies"	Shafer, Scooter Carusoe	3:45
5.	"When I Close My Eyes"	Shafer	4:01
6.	"In Between Disasters"	Harding, Shafer, Trevor Rosen, Shane McAnally	3:29
7.	"Happy"	Harding, Shafer	3:33
8.	"Nobody's Sad on a Saturday Night"	Harding, Shafer	3:18
9.	"Nuthin' Changes"	Harding, Shafer	3:45
10.	"Who We Are"	Shafer	3:13
11.	"It Is What It Is"	Harding, Shafer	3:35
Total length:			39:12

== Personnel ==
- Robert Bailey Jr. - background vocals
- Mark Beckett - drums
- Tom Bukovac - electric guitar
- John Catchings - cello
- Mark Douthit - saxophone
- Dan Dugmore - slide guitar
- Nick Garvin - background vocals
- Vicki Hampton - background vocals
- J. T. Harding - background vocals
- Mike Haynes - trumpet
- Uncle Kracker - lead vocals
- Randy McCormick - Hammond B-3 organ, keyboards, piano, Wurlitzer
- Brent Mason - acoustic guitar, electric guitar, slide guitar
- Gary Prim - accordion, Hammond B-3 organ, keyboards, piano, Wurlitzer
- John Wesley Ryles - background vocals
- Bobby Terry - acoustic guitar, electric guitar
- Michael White - background vocals
- Justin Wilson - background vocals
- Glenn Worf - bass guitar
- Joe Geis - album art

== Reception ==
=== Critical reception ===
Reception of the album has been mostly mixed to positive. Allmusic described the album as "a sunny, laid-back ride, a record made for lazy afternoons of day drinking." Roughstock gave the album 4/5 stars and stated "It'd be easy to dismiss Uncle Kracker's first full-length country album as yet another attempt by a pop/rock has-been trying to cash in on mainstream country music's popularity." They also added that Uncle Kracker's transition to Country felt like "A natural one." In a mixed review, Country Weekly noted Uncle Kracker "seeks to have him ingrained further in the genre, despite no hint of country instrumentation." On a more positive note, they added the album is "like tuning in to 1970s AM radio, full of sunny melodies and smooth grooves."

== Chart performance ==
=== Album ===
Chart (2012)	Peak position
US Top Country Albums (Billboard)	33
US Independent Albums (Billboard)	16

=== Singles ===
Year	Single	Peak chart positions	
Year	Single	US Country	US Country Airplay
2012	"Nobody's Sad on a Saturday Night"	42	43
2013	"Blue Skies"	—	47
"—" denotes releases that did not chart
