= Out on the Floor =

"Out On The Floor"

Single by Dobie Gray
- A-side: "Out On The Floor"
- B-side: "Be A Man"
- Released: 1966 (U.S.), 1975 (UK)
- Genre: Soul, pop
- Label: Black Magic BM 107
- Songwriter(s): Darian, De Lory

Dobie Gray singles chronology
| "Watch Out For Lucy" (1975 UK) | "Out On The Floor" (1966) | "What A Lady" (1976 UK) |

Out On The Floor is a single by Dobie Gray. Since its release in 1966, it has become significant as a popular northern soul song. It has been referred to as the song that defines northern soul.

== Background ==
The song was released in May, 1966 as a single backed by "No Room to Cry" on Charger CRG-115. The track was included on his album, "Dobie Gray Sings for "In" Crowders That Go "Go-Go". It was re-issued on the Black Magic label in 1975 (see record label).

It charted twice in the UK. The first time was in 1975, when it reached No. 42, spending 8 weeks in the chart. The second time was in 1983, when it settled in at No. 95.

=== References in popular culture etc. ===
In Nick Hornby's book, Juliet, Naked, the song is referred to as the "National Anthem of Northern". It is also mentioned in the book Oil and Honey: The Education of an Unlikely Activist by Bill McKibben, Last Days of Disco by David F. Ross, and more.

== Releases ==
List
| Title | Label, cat | Year | Country | Notes |
|---|---|---|---|---|
| "Out On The Floor" / "No Room To Cry" | Charger CRG-115 | 1966 | US | Original; Matrix / Runout (Side A runout, stamped): CR.2049; Matrix / Runout (Side B runout, stamped): CR.2050 |
| "Out On The Floor" / "No Room To Cry" | Reo 8943X | 1966 | Canada | |
| "Out On The Floor" / "No Room To Cry" | Soul Sounds SS 1030 | 1970 | UK | Repro |
| "Out On The Floor" / "No Room To Cry" | Charger Records CRG-115 | 1973 | US | Unofficial Release repro Matrix / Runout: CR 2049 (Scratched) |
| "Out On The Floor" / "Be A Man" | Black Magic BM 107 | 1975 | UK | |
| The Biggest Northern Sound Of All Time "(I Get My Kicks) Out On The Floor" / "Be A Man" | Destiny DS 1001 | 1979 | UK | |
| "Out On The Floor" / "Funky Funky Feelin'" | Inferno Soul Club BURN 2 | 1982 | UK | |
| "Out On The Floor" / "Out On The Floor (Neil's All Nighter Mix)" | Inferno Soul Club UK BURN 2 | 1983 | UK | Special Edition 7" |
| "Out On The Floor" / "The In Crowd" | Outta Sight OSV 077 | 2012 | UK | |
| "Out On The Floor" / "The Snake" | Goldmine Soul Supply Sevens GS 007 | | UK | B side by Al Wilson |
