= Beautiful (Christina Aguilera song) =

2002 single by Christina Aguilera

Single by Christina Aguilera

from the album Stripped
- B-side: "Dame lo que Yo Te Doy"
- Released: November 16, 2002
- Studio: The Enterprise (Burbank, California); Conway (Hollywood, California)
- Genre: Pop; R&B; operatic pop
- Length: 4:00
- Label: RCA
- Songwriter: Linda Perry
- Producer: Linda Perry

Christina Aguilera singles chronology
"Dirrty" (2002)	"Beautiful" (2002)	"Fighter" (2003)

Music video
- "Beautiful" on YouTube

"Beautiful" is a song recorded by American singer Christina Aguilera for her fourth studio album, Stripped (2002). It was released as the album's second single on November 16, 2002. A pop and R&B ballad, "Beautiful" was written and produced by Linda Perry and discusses inner-beauty, as well as self-esteem and insecurity. Aguilera commented that she put "her heart and soul" into the track, which she felt represented the theme of Stripped.

"Beautiful" received universal acclaim from music critics, who have ranked it among Aguilera's strongest material. It won the Grammy Award for Best Female Pop Vocal Performance and was also nominated for Song of the Year at the 2004 ceremony. "Beautiful" was also a commercial success, topping the charts in eleven countries, including Australia, Canada, Ireland and the United Kingdom. The song peaked at number two on the Billboard Hot 100 in the United States, where it was certified double platinum for over 2 million units sold.

"Beautiful" has been widely embraced as an anthem by the LGBTQ community for its message of self-empowerment and inner-beauty. An accompanying music video was directed by Jonas Åkerlund, and earned Aguilera a GLAAD Media Award for its positive portrayal of gay and transgender people. In 2011, UK LGBTQ rights organization Stonewall named "Beautiful" the most empowering song of the previous decade for gay, lesbian, and bisexual people. In 2009, Rolling Stone and VH1 listed it as one of the best songs of the 2000s. The song was later re-recorded in an electronic style, titled "You Are What You Are (Beautiful)", for her first greatest hits album Keeps Gettin' Better: A Decade of Hits (2008).

== Background and recording ==
"Beautiful" was written and produced by Linda Perry. Christina Aguilera recorded the song at two studios: The Enterprise Studios in Burbank, California, and Conway Recording Studios in Hollywood. Prior to the collaboration with Aguilera, Perry had written the song with the intention of recording it for a solo record. Perry previewed the song for Pink during recording sessions for the latter's sophomore studio album Missundaztood (2001), on which Perry worked as a producer. However, after hearing Aguilera sing the song at Perry's house to "break the ice", Perry was very impressed and allowed Aguilera to include the track on her then-upcoming album Stripped. The choice resulted in a feud between Pink against Aguilera and Perry, with the former stating that it was "annoying" for the latter to collaborate with artists "[she] didn't like".

Perry later revealed to ASCAP, "When Christina came over to my house to start working, she asked me to play some songs to break the ice. [...] I had a long conversation with my manager about it. We both decided to hear Christina sing it. We demoed the song with her singing it, and I was like, 'Wow'. That rough vocal is what is out there on radio. It was that vocal that got her the song". In 2016, Perry's then-wife Sara Gilbert confirmed on her show The Talk that the final version was "just a demo." Gilbert also revealed that Aguilera wanted to re-record the song because she did not like the initial vocals. Perry denied the request because the song is supposed to be about imperfection and being vulnerable. Perry said as Aguilera stepped in the booth to record, she said to her friend, "Don't look at me" – which Perry left at the start of the final track. She told Rolling Stone: "I knew I was going to keep that on the record, and I knew she was the right person for the song. I realized, 'Oh, she's insecure. She's one of those beautiful people who's got everything but is super insecure. Okay, this song is hers.'" In 2026, Perry repudiated on this story, stating that Aguilera begged her to let her re-record the song for seven months, and that when Perry finally agreed to re-record the song, she expressed her fears that Aguilera would "ruin" the song with the re-recording. Perry added that as Aguilera began re-recording the song, she caught herself oversinging the first verse, and promptly stopped the recording and conceded to Perry.

== Composition and lyrics ==
"Beautiful" (2002)
23-second sample of "Beautiful", a piano-driven ballad with bass guitar, cello, drums, keyboards, piano, and violin

"Beautiful" is a pop and R&B ballad that discusses issues of self-esteem and insecurity, promoting a message of self-empowerment and embracing inner beauty. Larry Flick of Billboard added that the song talks about "overcoming life's trials", Chuck Taylor also of Billboard observed that it has a message of "holding oneself up against criticism from the outside," and Todd Burns of Stylus noted that the song "also explores the main theme of the record, being stripped bare in front of the public." Its instrumentation incorporates bass guitar, cello, drum kits, keyboards, piano, and violin. Sheet music for "Beautiful" gives the key of E♭ Mixolydian, with a slow tempo of 76 beats per minute. Aguilera's vocal range spans over two octaves from the low note of E♭_{3} to the high note of G_{5}; she uses several melismas in the song, fitting as many as seven notes in one syllable.

== Release ==
"Beautiful" was released as the second single from Stripped. It was first sent to American contemporary hit and rhythmic radio stations on November 16, 2002. The song was later released as a CD single on January 27, February 10, February 24, and February 25, 2003, in Germany, Australia, the United Kingdom, and France, respectively. Also on February 25, a digital remix EP of "Beautiful" was released worldwide. Two days later, the single was released as a maxi single in Canada. On March 11, 2003, the single was released as a CD in the United States.

== Critical reception ==
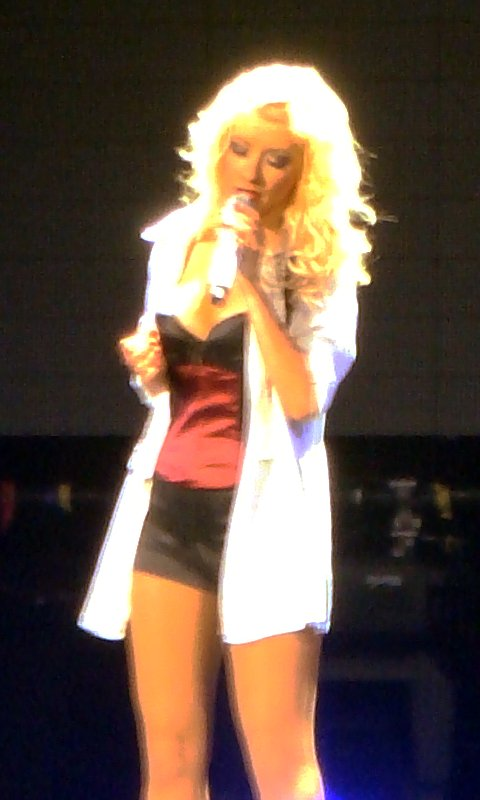
Aguilera performing "Beautiful" on her Back to Basics Tour

"Beautiful" received universal acclaim from music critics who praised its empowering lyrics. Stephen Thomas Erlewine of AllMusic commended the song for not following the "club and street-level R&B, which fit her poorly". Similarly, a reviewer from Billboard described "Beautiful" as a "single-worthy ballad" from a record of "pleasantly surprising depth". In a separate review, Chuck Taylor from the same magazine deemed the song "breathtaking", and highlighted its melody and lyrical message. Entertainment Weekly's David Browne called the song one of Stripped's "moments", noting that it is "more restrained" than the other songs from the album. Sal Cinquemani of Slant Magazine commented that the collaboration with Linda Perry found Aguilera "truly naked" and reflective of the album's title. Stylus Magazine's Todd Burns gave Stripped a negative review, but complimented "Beautiful" for "tastefully [reining] in Aguilera's frequent vocal acrobatics". Jane Dark of The Village Voice compared the song to the works of Mariah Carey "made back when she was a natural", and the Attitude magazine called it "universal". The Advocate's Larry Flick named "Beautiful" a "Beatlesque ballad" and the "great queer anthem of 2003". He also listed it as one of the best songs of the year. Ian Watson of Dotmusic shared a similar sentiment to Flick's, writing that the single resembles the work of the Beatles. In contrast, Amanda Murray from Sputnikmusic criticized the "platitude-drenched" lyrics but praised the overall production. At the 2004 Grammy Awards, "Beautiful" won the award for Best Female Pop Vocal Performance and was nominated for Song of the Year.

"Beautiful" is considered to be Aguilera's signature song and has been recognized as being among the strongest tracks in her catalog. The song was ranked as her third-best single by Rachel McRady of Wetpaint, who commented that "[Aguilera]'s inspiration ballad motivated an entire generation". PopCrush's Alexandra Capotorto named it as her favorite track by Aguilera, opining that the song is "definitely one of the most memorable and greatest Christina Aguilera songs to date". Rolling Stone ranked "Beautiful" at number 52 on their list of the 100 best songs of the 2000s, stating that it is "delivered with full-fathom force by the bottle-blond with the biggest voice". Similarly, VH1 positioned the track at number 18 on their list of the 100 greatest songs of the past decade. It is listed as one of the 100 best pop songs of all time by About.com. Pride Life Global ranked it as one of the twenty best gay anthems of all time. Blender ranked the song on its 2005 list of the 500 greatest songs of the 1980s–2000s, praising Aguilera for her "near-operatic vocals".

== Chart performance ==
"Beautiful" was quickly released after the underperformance of the album's first single, "Dirrty" in the United States. It achieved international success and was the highest-charting single from Stripped in several territories. The song peaked at number two on the US Billboard Hot 100 for one week, becoming Aguilera's longest-charting solo track, spending 27 weeks on the chart. The song additionally topped Billboard Adult Contemporary, Dance Club Play, and Mainstream Top 40 component charts. In October 2022, it was certified double platinum by the Recording Industry Association of America (RIAA) for shipments of 2,000,000 copies. As of August 2014, the single has sold 1,512,000 digital copies in that country. In Canada, the song peaked at number one on the Billboard Canadian Hot 100. Similarly, "Beautiful" proved successful in Europe, where it peaked within the top five of most markets in which it was released. The song entered the UK Singles Chart at number 71 and peaked atop the chart in its fourth week, becoming Aguilera's fourth UK number one; it was certified silver by the British Phonographic Industry. It peaked at numbers three and 18 on the Belgian Ultratop 50 and Ultratop 40, respectively. In Germany, the song peaked at number four after charting for thirteen weeks on the Media Control GfK chart. However, "Beautiful" proved less successful on the French Syndicat National de l'Édition Phonographique, where it reached number 27. The song was a success in Australia, peaking at number one on the ARIA Singles Chart, where it spent a total of 13 weeks. "Beautiful" was later certified platinum by the Australian Recording Industry Association (ARIA) for shipments of 70,000 units. The song also charted on the New Zealand Top 40 Singles Chart for 23 weeks, during which period it peaked at number one.

In 2011, Aguilera performed the song alongside her finalist Beverly McClellan on the first-season finale of The Voice. The following week, it debuted at number 74 on the US Billboard Hot 100 and peaked at number 52 on the Hot Digital Songs diagram with first-week sales of 42,000 downloads on the iTunes Store.

== Music videos ==
"Aguilera's plaintive performance was intercut with scenes of gay and transgendered people grappling with their inner and external beauty. Unlike much of the media's portrayal of queers in recent times, 'Beautiful' was devoid of clownish camp and diva-like poses. It zeroed in on the reality of how some struggle with finding their beauty in a world where they're inherently different."

— Larry Flick analyses the video (2004).

The accompanying music video for "Beautiful" was directed by Jonas Åkerlund and premiered on December 9, 2002. It opens with Aguilera speaking the line "Don't look at me", followed by scenes of her singing alone in a room intercut with self-image-related sequences of other people. An anorexic girl examines herself in a mirror, eventually punching through it; a thin teenage boy stands lifting weights in a room plastered with images of bodybuilders; and an African-American girl rips out pages of women's magazines including photos of only white women and throws them into a fire. In one sequence, a girl is physically bullied by several peers, and in another, a goth man sits at the back of a bus while several people get up and move. The video also touches on LGBT issues; one scene features a gay couple, portrayed by Jordan Shannon and Justin Croft, kissing on a bench and ignoring the stares of people who pass them. Another shows a transgender woman, played by Robert Sherman, putting on makeup, a wig, and women's clothing. The music video debuted at number 2 on Total Request Live, spending a total of 50 days on the chart and retiring at number 6. It topped MuchMusic's Countdown for two consecutive weeks and remained on the countdown for 15 weeks.

The video was positively reviewed by music critics, and received a Special Recognition award, presented by David LaChapelle, from the Gay & Lesbian Alliance Against Defamation at its 14th GLAAD Media Awards. After an a cappella performance of the song, Aguilera stated in her acceptance speech that "this song is definitely a universal message that everybody can relate to – anyone that's been discriminated against or unaccepted, unappreciated or disrespected just because of who you are. It was so important to me that I support the gay community in this sense." Billboard included "Beautiful" on its list of the greatest music videos of the 21st century, and Gail Mitchell wrote that it "eloquently touches on insecurity". Gay journalist Larry Flick praised the video for its "stunning execution" and depiction of self-love, and noted that with its help the song "became a perfect slice of cinematic empowerment". In 2024, Glamour noted that the video "was a true act of radicalism in the face of America's puritanical, conservative Bush years".

On October 21, 2022, Aguilera released a new music video for the song, which depicts kids and teens grappling with the onslaught of negative messaging on social media, body dysmorphia, plastic surgery, depression, and suicidal ideation. CelebMix called the message behind the video "powerful", noting that it "highlights the impact of popular culture and social media on young people". Aguilera was given the Cybersmiler of the Month Award after the video was released. It also won the British Television Advertising Award, and won two awards at the 2023 Webby's — Best Music Video and Best Video (People's Voice).

== Live performances ==
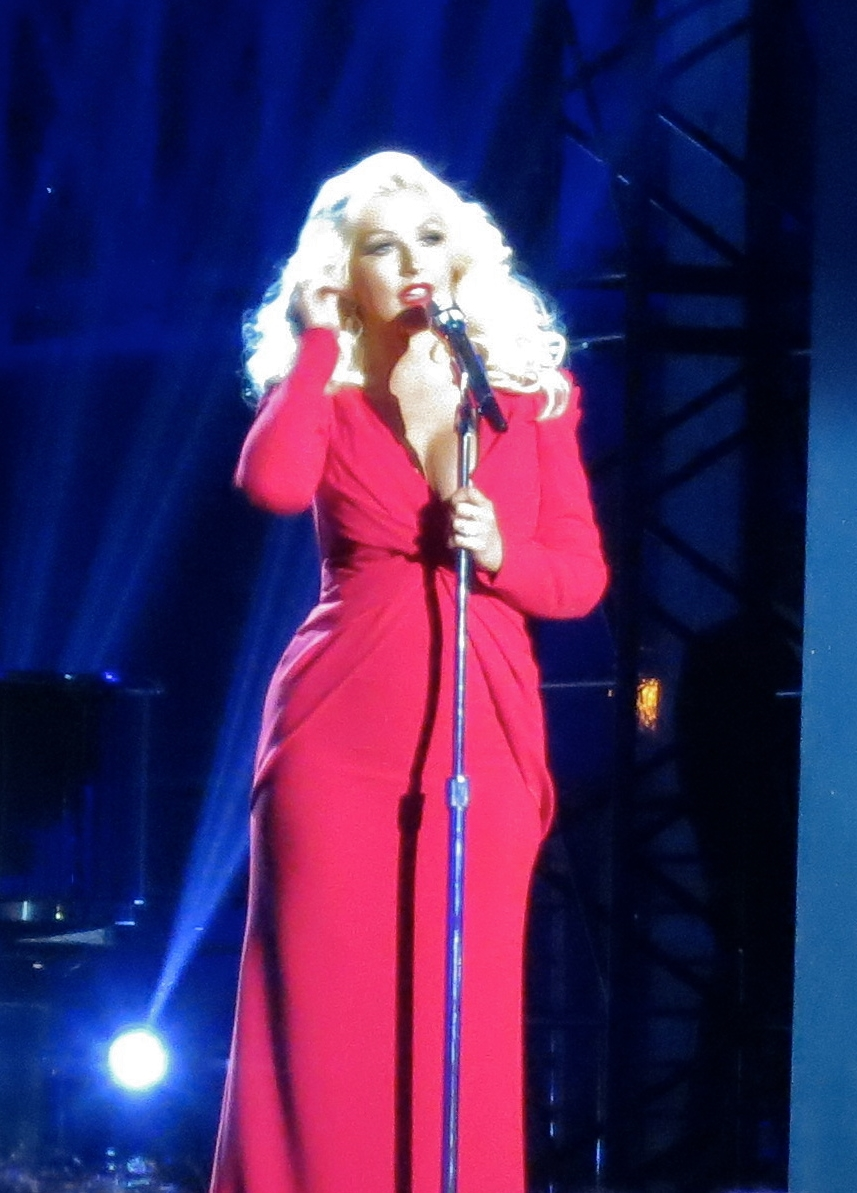
Aguilera performs the song at the 2014 Breakthrough Prize ceremony

Recognized as one of her signature songs, Aguilera has performed "Beautiful" at a number of venues and events. During the promotion of Stripped, she appeared on VH1's Big In Awards, Top of the Pops, and the 46th Annual Grammy Awards. The song was included on the setlists of The Stripped Tour, the Justified and Stripped Tour in 2003 and the Back to Basics Tour in 2006. "Beautiful" was also sung on the television special VH1 Storytellers in 2010. "Beautiful" has also been performed on charity events and fundraisings, such as CNN Heroes introduced by Anderson Cooper saying, "It's my pleasure to introduce a performer with unparalleled range and passion; her song is a reminder that out of great trials and tribulations we can all create something beautiful"; Justin Timberlake & Friends in 2010, and Hurricane Sandy: Coming Together in 2012.

In 2021, Aguilera sang "Beautiful" at the Verizon's "Big Concert for Small Business" Super Bowl afterparty, at her performance at the Hollywood Bowl with Gustavo Dudamel and the Los Angeles Philharmonic, as well as the 47th People's Choice Awards.

In January 2026, Aguilera performed the song at the Gala des Pièces Jaunes in Paris, in front of an audience of 35,000 people.

== Legacy ==
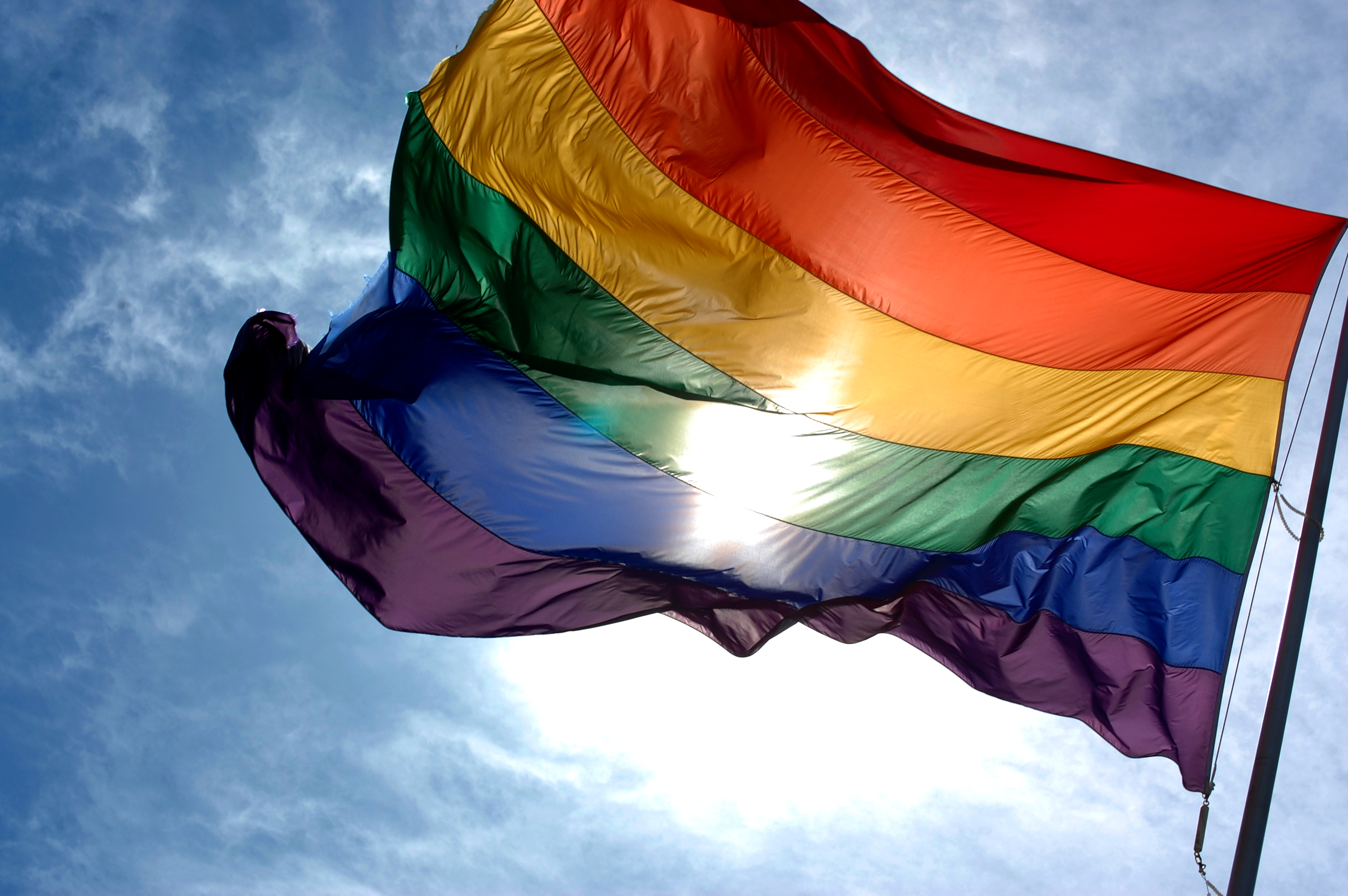
"Beautiful" is widely regarded as an anthem by the LGBT community.

"Beautiful" has been embraced by the LGBT community as an anthem. The Advocate's Larry Flick believed the release of the song was "one of the most powerful moments of queer activism in 2003". On October 5, 2010, several hundred people gathered in front of the Massachusetts State House and sang "Beautiful" as a tribute to the teenagers who had committed suicide due to anti-gay bullying during the previous months. In March 2011, the Columbus Children's Choir and Columbus Gay Men's Chorus joined to perform the song as a contribution to the It Gets Better Project. UK LGBT rights charity Stonewall named "Beautiful" the most empowering song of the decade for lesbian, gay and bisexual people; media personality and Stonewall contributor Paul Gambaccini called the song "a major achievement that has inspired millions of young people around the world." The result is based on the choice from 1,007 readers. Aguilera commented of the song's reception from the LGBT community, "I cannot express in words how much the LGBT community means to me. On my darkest day their support lifts me up. I feel honored that some of my songs become anthems to them as well."

"Beautiful" Attitude and Glamour magazines noted that before Katy Perry's "Firework" (2010) and Lady Gaga's "Born This Way" (2011), there was "Beautiful" by Aguilera. The transgender character from its music video seemingly influenced the Denis O'Hare's Liz Taylor role in the horror television series American Horror Story: Hotel. Sabrina Carpenter stated that "Beautiful" inspired her vocally and artistically. Rita Ora noted that the music video for "Beautiful" inspired her song "Girl in the Mirror", and Alessia Cara credits the ballad as source of inspiration for her single "Scars to Your Beautiful". In 2022, Billboard ranked the song the second on their list of "The 100 Greatest Songs of 2002". They noted that the "Grammy-winning empowerment anthem provides a stunningly detailed illustration of the search for one's inner beauty amid battling insecurities".

== Formats and track listings ==
- US, Germany and France CD single
1. "Beautiful" – 3:58
2. "Dame lo que Yo Te Doy" – 3:46
3. "Beautiful" (music video) – 3:59
- UK CD single
1. "Beautiful" – 3:58
2. "Dirrty" (MaUVe Remix) – 8:11
3. "Beautiful" (music video) – 3:59
- Digital remix EP
1. "Beautiful" (Peter Rauhofer Radio Mix) – 3:58
2. "Beautiful" (Al B Rich Radio Mix) – 4:14
3. "Beautiful" (Valentin Radio Mix) – 3:59
4. "Beautiful" (Peter Rauhofer Short Club) – 7:03
5. "Beautiful" (Brother Brown Mishow) – 5:11
6. "Beautiful" (Brother Brown Divine Mix) – 9:03
7. "Beautiful" (Al B Rich Next Level Mix) – 8:36
8. "Beautiful" (Peter Rauhofer Beautiful Theme) – 3:40
9. "Beautiful" (Valentin Club Mix) – 5:56
10. "Beautiful" (Peter Rauhofer Extended Club) – 10:33
11. "Beautiful" (Brother Brown Dub) – 7:50

== Credits and personnel ==
Credits are adapted from the "Beautiful" CD single liner notes.

=== Recording locations ===
- Mixed at The Enterprise Studios, Burbank, California
- Engineered at Mad Dog Studios, Burbank, California
- Additional recording at The Enterprise Studios, Burbank, California
- Mastered at Bernie Grundman Mastering

=== Personnel ===
- Writing, Composing, Producing – Linda Perry
- Mixing – Dave "Hard Drive" Pensado
- Assisted mixing – Ethan Willoughby
- Engineering – Linda Perry, David Guerrero
- Pro Tools engineering – Davy Vain
- Mastering – Brian "Big Bass" Gardner
- Editing – Mike Barnard

=== Musicians ===
- Vocals – Christina Aguilera
- Piano, Guitar, Bass – Linda Perry
- Keyboards – Damon Fox
- Drums – Brian MacLeod
- Strings – The Section Quartet
  - Violin – Eric Gorfain
  - Viola – Shanti Randall
  - Cello – Richard Dodd
- Additional Strings and String Arrangement – Linda Perry

== Charts ==
=== Weekly charts ===
Weekly chart performance for "Beautiful"
Chart (2002–2003)	Peak position
Australia (ARIA)	1
Australian Club (ARIA)	2
Austria (Ö3 Austria Top 40)	5
Belgium (Ultratop 50 Flanders)	3
Belgium (Ultratop 50 Wallonia)	18
Canada (Nielsen SoundScan)	1
Canada Radio (Nielsen BDS)	1
Canada AC (Nielsen BDS)	1
Canada CHR/Top 40 (Nielsen BDS)	1
Croatia International (HRT) (Note: Only a partial archive of the Croatian chart is available so it is possible that the single had a higher peak.)	8
Czech Republic (Rádio Top 50)	7
Denmark (Tracklisten)	9
Ecuador (Notimex)	1
El Salvador (Notimex)	3
Europe (Eurochart Hot 100)	3
Finland Airplay (Suomen virallinen lista)	2
France (SNEP)	27
Germany (GfK)	4
Guatemala (Notimex)	1
Hungary (Rádiós Top 40)	6
Hungary (Single Top 40)	10
Iceland (Íslenski Listinn Topp 20)	2
Ireland (IRMA)	1
Italy (FIMI)	8
Lithuania (AGATA)	1
Netherlands (Dutch Top 40)	2
Netherlands (Single Top 100)	4
New Zealand (Recorded Music NZ)	1
Norway (VG-lista)	5
Peru (Notimex)	3
Poland Airplay (Music & Media)	1
Poland (Polish Airplay Top 30)	3
Romania (Romanian Top 100)	1
Scottish Singles Sales (Official Charts)	1
Sweden (Sverigetopplistan)	3
Switzerland (Schweizer Hitparade)	7
UK Singles (Official Charts)	1
US Billboard Hot 100	2
US Adult Contemporary (Billboard)	1
US Adult Pop Airplay (Billboard)	9
US Dance Club Songs (Billboard)	1
US Dance Singles Sales (Billboard)	15
US Pop Airplay (Billboard)	1
US Rhythmic Airplay (Billboard)	13

=== Year-end charts ===
Year-end chart performance for "Beautiful"
Chart (2003)	Position
Australia (ARIA)	24
Austria (Ö3 Austria Top 40)	45
Belgium (Ultratop 50 Flanders)	31
Belgium (Ultratop 50 Wallonia)	84
Brazil (Crowley)	73
Germany (Media Control GfK)	79
Ireland (IRMA)	16
Italy (FIMI)	45
Netherlands (Dutch Top 40)	20
Netherlands (Single Top 100)	35
New Zealand (RIANZ)	3
Romania (Romania Top 100)	23
Sweden (Hitlistan)	27
Switzerland (Schweizer Hitparade)	66
UK Singles (OCC)	23
US Billboard Hot 100	16
US Adult Contemporary (Billboard)	5
US Adult Top 40 (Billboard)	30
US Mainstream Top 40 (Billboard)	4
US Rhythmic Top 40 (Billboard)	49

== Certifications ==
Certifications and sales for "Beautiful"
Region	Certification	Certified units/sales
Australia (ARIA)	Platinum	70,000^{^}
Canada (Music Canada)	2× Platinum	160,000^{‡}
Denmark (IFPI Danmark)	Gold	45,000^{‡}
France	—	22,406
Italy (FIMI)	Gold	25,000^{‡}
Mexico (AMPROFON)	2× Platinum	120,000^{‡}
New Zealand (RMNZ)	Platinum	15,000^{*}
Spain (Promusicae)	Gold	30,000^{‡}
United Kingdom (BPI)	Platinum	600,000^{‡}
United States (RIAA)	2× Platinum	2,000,000^{‡}
^{*} Sales figures based on certification alone.^{^} Shipments figures based on certification alone.^{‡} Sales+streaming figures based on certification alone.

== Release history ==
Release dates and formats for "Beautiful"
Region	Date	Format(s)	Label(s)	Ref.
United States	November 16, 2002	Contemporary hit radio; rhythmic contemporary radio	RCA	
Germany	January 27, 2003	Maxi CD	BMG	
Australia	February 10, 2003	Maxi CD	BMG	
Sweden	February 10, 2003	Maxi CD	RCA	
United Kingdom	February 24, 2003	Cassette; maxi CD	RCA	
France	February 25, 2003	Maxi CD	Jive	
Canada	February 27, 2003	Maxi CD	BMG	
United States	March 18, 2003	12-inch vinyl	RCA	

== See also ==
- List of number-one adult contemporary singles of 2003 (U.S.)
- List of number-one dance singles of 2003 (U.S.)
- List of Romanian Top 100 number ones of the 2000s
