= I Still Believe in Fairy Tales =

Studio album by Tammy Wynette
- Released: September 8, 1975
- Recorded: Dec. 1974–Jun. 1975
- Studio: Columbia (Nashville, Tennessee)
- Genre: Country
- Length: 26:53
- Label: Epic
- Producer: Billy Sherrill

Tammy Wynette chronology
George & Tammy & Tina (1975)	I Still Believe in Fairy Tales (1975)	'Til I Can Make It on My Own (1976)

Singles from I Still Believe in Fairy Tales
- 1. "I Still Believe in Fairy Tales" Released: August 1975

Professional ratings
Review scores
Source	Rating
Allmusic	2/5 stars

I Still Believe in Fairy Tales is the fourteenth studio album by American country music singer-songwriter Tammy Wynette. It was released on September 8, 1975, by Epic Records.

== Commercial performance ==
The album peaked at No. 24 on the Billboard Country Albums chart. The album's only single, "I Still Believe in Fairy Tales", peaked at No. 13 on the Billboard Country Singles chart.

== Track listing ==
Side one
No.	Title	Writer(s)	Length
1.	"I Still Believe in Fairy Tales"	Grady Martin	2:20
2.	"I Did My Best (To Fall in Love Last Night)"	Jimmy Payne, Danny Hice, Ruby Hice	2:34
3.	"Brown Paper Bag"	Larry Gatlin	3:01
4.	"I Just Had You on My Mind"	Sue Richards	3:25
5.	"Dallas"	Leona Williams	2:10

Side two
No.	Title	Writer(s)	Length
1.	"I'll Take What You Can Give Me (When You Can)"	Billy Sherrill, Sammy Lyons, Steve Davis	2:45
2.	"I'm Not a Has-Been (I Just Never Was)"	Tammy Wynette, Carmol Taylor	2:47
3.	"The Man from Bowling Green"	Troy Seals, Max D. Barnes	2:17
4.	"The Bottle"	Tammy Wynette	2:30
5.	"Your Memory's Gone to Rest"	Tammy Wynette	3:04

== Personnel ==
Adapted from the album liner notes.

- Lou Bradley - engineer
- The Nashville Edition - backing vocals
- Billy Sherrill - producer
- Tammy Wynette - lead vocals

== Chart positions ==
=== Album ===
Year	Chart	Peak position
1975	Country Albums (Billboard)	24

=== Singles ===
Year	Single	Chart	Peak position
1975	"I Still Believe in Fairy Tales"	Country Singles (Billboard)	13
