= (You Make Me Want to Be a) Mother =

Single by Tammy Wynette

from the album Tammy Wynette's Greatest Hits, Volume 3
- B-side: "I'm Not a Has Been (I Just Never Was)"
- Released: January 1975
- Recorded: December 1974
- Studio: Columbia Recording Studio; Nashville, Tennessee, U.S.
- Genre: Country
- Length: 2:51
- Label: Epic
- Songwriters: Billy Sherrill; Norro Wilson
- Producer: Billy Sherrill

Tammy Wynette singles chronology
"Woman to Woman" (1974)	"(You Make Me Want to Be a) Mother" (1975)	"I Still Believe in Fairy Tales" (1975)

"(You Make Me Want to Be a) Mother" is a song written by Billy Sherrill and Norro Wilson, and recorded by American country music artist Tammy Wynette. It was released in January 1975 as a single from her compilation album Tammy's Greatest Hits, Vol. 3.

== Background and reception ==
"(You Make Me Want to Be a) Mother" was first recorded in November 1969 at the Columbia Recording Studio in Nashville, Tennessee. Two additional tracks were recorded during this session including the single's B-side. The recording session was produced by Billy Sherrill, Wynette's long-time producer.

The song reached number 4 on the Billboard Hot Country Singles chart in 1975.

== Track listings ==
7" vinyl single

- "(You Make Me Want to Be a) Mother" – 2:22
- "I'm Not a Has Been (I Just Never Was)" – 2:46

== Charts ==
=== Weekly charts ===
Chart (1975)	Peak position
US Hot Country Songs (Billboard)	4
CAN Country Singles (RPM)	9

=== Year-end charts ===
Chart (1975)	Position
US Hot Country Songs (Billboard)	31
