= Good to Be Me =

Single by Uncle Kracker with Kid Rock

from the album Happy Hour
- Released: July 12, 2010
- Genre: Country rock
- Length: 4:12
- Label: Top Dog/Atlantic
- Songwriters: Matthew Shafer; Brett James; J. T. Harding; Robert J. Ritchie
- Producer: Rob Cavallo

Uncle Kracker singles chronology
"Smile" (2009)	"Good to Be Me" (2010)	"My Hometown" (2011)

Kid Rock singles chronology
"Can't You See" (2010)	"Good to Be Me" (2010)	"Let's Roll" (2011)

Music video
- "Good to Be Me" on YouTube

"Good to Be Me" is a song recorded by Uncle Kracker. It was released in 2010 as the second single from Kracker's album Happy Hour. The song was written by Matthew Shafer, Brett James, J. T. Harding and Robert J. Ritchie. The single version features Kracker's friend Kid Rock.

== Critical reception ==
Giving it 3.5 stars out of 5, Bobby Peacock of Roughstock said that it was "laid back, happy and tuneful", and that it would "stand out" because of its rock sound.

== Music video ==
The music video was directed by Christopher Sims and premiered in September 2010.

== Chart performance ==
The song debuted at number 55 on the U.S. Billboard Hot Country Singles & Tracks chart for the week of July 31, 2010.

Chart (2010–2011)	Peak position
US Adult Pop Airplay (Billboard)	29
US Hot Country Songs (Billboard)	28
US Bubbling Under Hot 100 (Billboard)	13
