= Seventy Two and Sunny =

Studio album by Uncle Kracker
- Released: June 29, 2004
- Recorded: 2003–2004
- Studio: Chunky Style Music Studios, Los Angeles, California
- Genre: Country; pop
- Length: 52:46
- Label: Lava; Top Dog
- Producer: Mike Bradford; Uncle Kracker; Kid Rock (exec.)

Uncle Kracker chronology
No Stranger to Shame (2002)	Seventy Two and Sunny (2004)	Happy Hour (2009)

Singles from Seventy Two and Sunny
- 1. "Rescue" Released: 2004; 2. "Writing It Down" Released: 2004

Professional ratings
Aggregate scores
Source	Rating
Metacritic	52/100
Review scores
Source	Rating
Allmusic	2/5 stars
Billboard	(favorable)
Blender	2/5 stars
Entertainment Weekly	B−
Rolling Stone	2/5 stars
Spin	(6/10)
The Village Voice	(unfavorable)

Seventy Two and Sunny is Uncle Kracker's third studio album, released on Lava Records on June 29, 2004. It is Uncle Kracker's first album not to receive a parental advisory sticker and to feature no rap songs. It is also his last to be released on Lava Records.

== Critical reception ==
Seventy Two and Sunny was met with "mixed or average" reviews from critics. At Metacritic, which assigns a weighted average rating out of 100 to reviews from mainstream publications, this release received an average score of 52 based on 8 reviews.

Among the positive reviews is Chuck Kosterman's take in Spin Magazine, where he writes "You’d have to work pretty hard not to like these songs, though I’m sure some people will try", a reference to the fact that Uncle Kracker was never a critic's darling, despite his record sales. In a review AllMusic, John Luerssen noted the album is "largely absent of originality", while going on to say "like the bulk of Uncle Kracker's second musical helping, it's dang hard to swallow." David Browne's mixed review in Entertainment Weekly said: "Kracker now sees himself as a scruffy Nashville troubadour, and on his third CD, he pulls off the conceit far better than [Kid] Rock has." On a critical note, Browne adds "Kracker's voice is too banal - and his material too mundane - to cut as deeply as his rural heroes."

== Track listing ==
All tracks are written by Michael Bradford and Matt Shafer, unless noted.

Seventy Two and Sunny track listing
No.	Title	Writer(s)	Length
1.	"This Time"		3:41
2.	"Rescue"	Diane Warren	4:04
3.	"Further Down the Road"		4:23
4.	"Don't Know How (Not to Love You)"	Frank J. Myers; Shafer; Bradford	4:10
5.	"What Do We Want?"		3:34
6.	"Writing It Down"	Bradford	4:37
7.	"A Place at My Table"		4:16
8.	"Some Things You Can't Take Back"		4:11
9.	"Blues Man"		3:19
10.	"Songs About Me, Songs About You"		3:34
11.	"Please Come Home"	M. Miers; Shafer	3:59
12.	"You're Not Free"		3:31
13.	"Last Night Again" (featuring Kenny Chesney)		2:57

== Personnel ==
- Uncle Kracker – lead vocals
- Mike Bradford – banjo, bass guitar, dobro, acoustic guitar, electric guitar, pedal steel guitar, piano, keyboards, drums, background vocals
- Laurie Melanson – dobro, acoustic guitar, harmonica, hi–string guitar
- Frank J. Myers – acoustic guitar, background vocals
- Dan Dugmore – pedal steel guitar
- Brent Mason – electric guitar
- Eric Gorfain – violin
- John Catchings – cello
- Larry Paxton – double bass
- Richard Baker – piano
- Jerome Day – drums
- Eddie Bayers – drums
- Russ Kunkel – drums
- Annie Ree Bradford – introduction vocals
- Kenny Chesney – lead vocals on "Last Night Again"
- Bret Michaels – background vocals on "Last Night Again"
- Phil Vassar – piano and background vocals on "Writing It Down"

== Charts ==
Chart performance for Seventy Two and Sunny
Chart (2004)	Peak position
US Billboard 200	39
