= Drift Away =

1970 song written by Mentor Williams

Song by Mike Berry

from the album Drift Away
- Released: 1972
- Length: 3:13
- Label: York
- Songwriter: Mentor Williams

"Drift Away"

Single by John Henry Kurtz

from the album Reunion
- Written: 1970
- Released: 1972
- Genre: Swamp rock
- Length: 3:30
- Label: ABC
- Songwriter: Mentor Williams
- Producers: Steve Barri; Dan Walsh; Harvey Price

John Henry Kurtz singles chronology
"Drift Away" (1972)	"One Tin Soldier" (1973)

"Drift Away" is a song written by Mentor Williams in 1970 and originally recorded by British singer and actor Mike Berry on his 1972 album Drift Away. A version by John Henry Kurtz was released two months later in November 1972. Mentor Williams was a country songwriter, and John Henry Kurtz was an actor and swamp rock singer. It was later given to soul singer Dobie Gray for whom it became a surprise international hit. In 1973, the song became Gray's biggest hit, peaking at number five on the US Billboard Hot 100 and receiving a gold certification from the Recording Industry Association of America (RIAA). The song has been covered by numerous musicians.

== Dobie Gray version ==
"Drift Away"

Single by Dobie Gray

from the album Drift Away
- B-side: "City Stars"
- Released: January 1973
- Genre: Soft rock; soul
- Length: 3:54
- Label: Decca
- Songwriter: Mentor Williams
- Producer: Mentor Williams

Dobie Gray singles chronology
"Rose Garden" (1972)	"Drift Away" (1973)	"Loving Arms" (1973)

=== Personnel ===
- Dobie Gray – vocals
- David Briggs – keyboards
- Mike Leech – bass
- Kenny Malone – drums
- Troy Seals – acoustic and electric guitar
- Reggie Young – acoustic and electric guitar and banjo
- Weldon Myrick – pedal steel guitar
- Buddy Spicher – violin on L.A.Lady
- Mentor Williams – acoustic guitar on Now That I Am Without You

=== Charts ===
==== Weekly charts ====
Chart (1973)	Peak position
Australia (Kent Music Report)	44
Canada Top Singles (RPM)	7
US Billboard Hot 100	5
US Adult Contemporary (Billboard)	12
US Hot Soul Singles (Billboard)	42
US Cash Box Top 100	8

==== Year-end charts ====
Chart (1973)	Rank
Canada Top Singles (RPM)	83
US Billboard Hot 100	17
US Cash Box Top 100	18

=== Certifications ===
Region	Certification	Certified units/sales
United Kingdom (BPI)	Silver	200,000^{‡}
United States (RIAA)	Gold	1,000,000^{^}
^{^} Shipments figures based on certification alone.

== Other versions ==
=== Narvel Felts version ===
"Drift Away"

Single by Narvel Felts

from the album Drift Away
- B-side: "Foggy Misty Morning"
- Released: 1973
- Length: 3:15
- Label: Cinnamon
- Producer: Farah Productions

Narvel Felts singles chronology
"Rockin' Little Angel" (1973)	"Drift Away" (1973)	"All in the Name of Love" (1973)

A country version was recorded by American country music and rockabilly singer Narvel Felts in 1973. Felts' version — which changed the lyrics "I wanna get lost in your rock and roll" to "I wanna get lost in your country song" — peaked at number 8 on the US Billboard Hot Country Singles chart in mid-August 1973, about three months after Gray's version reached its popularity peak. This song marked Narvel's first success in the country scene, as he was known from the late 1950s as a rockabilly singer.

==== Charts (Narvel Felts) ====
Chart (1973)	Peak position
Canada Country Tracks (RPM)	48
US Hot Country Singles (Billboard)	8

=== Michael Bolton version ===
"Drift Away"

Single by Michael Bolton

from the album Timeless: The Classics
- Released: December 14, 1992
- Length: 6:07
- Label: Columbia
- Producers: David Foster; Walter Afanasieff; Michael Bolton

Michael Bolton singles chronology
"To Love Somebody" (1992)	"Drift Away" (1992)	"Reach Out I'll Be There" (1992)

American singer and songwriter Michael Bolton covered "Drift Away" and released it as the second single from his 1992 covers album, Timeless: The Classics, in December 1992 by Columbia Records. His rendition was produced by Bolton with David Foster and Walter Afanasieff. It became the only hit version of the song in the United Kingdom, where it reached number 18, and also charted in Ireland and New Zealand.

==== Charts ====
Chart (1992–1993)	Peak position
Australia (ARIA)	104
Europe (Eurochart Hot 100)	35
Europe (European Hit Radio)	39
Iceland (Íslenski Listinn Topp 40)	18
Ireland (IRMA)	15
New Zealand (Recorded Music NZ)	23
UK Singles (Official Charts)	18
UK Airplay (Music Week)	10

=== Uncle Kracker featuring Dobie Gray version ===
"Drift Away"

Single by Uncle Kracker featuring Dobie Gray

from the album No Stranger to Shame
- Released: January 27, 2003
- Length: 4:15 (album version); 3:40 (radio edit)
- Label: Lava
- Producers: Michael Bradford; Uncle Kracker

Uncle Kracker singles chronology
"In a Little While" (2002)	"Drift Away" (2003)	"Memphis Soul Song" (2003)

Dobie Gray singles chronology
"Take It Real Easy" (1987)	"Drift Away" (2003)

Music video
- "Drift Away" on YouTube

American singer-songwriter Uncle Kracker released a cover version from his second studio album, No Stranger to Shame (2002), in January 2003. This version, which features Dobie Gray singing parts of the song with Kracker, reached number nine on the Billboard Hot 100 and spent a then-record-setting 28 weeks atop the Billboard Adult Contemporary chart. It also peaked at number 25 on the New Zealand Singles Chart.

==== Music video ====
The music video for the song was directed by Bronston Jones. Filmed in Kracker's hometown of Detroit, it shows him performing the song on stage to an audience (Dobie, during his parts, comes in to perform) and Kracker working at a garage (owned by his brother), unloading and stacking tires. Scenes also feature him walking alone on snowy railroad tracks, and singing on an empty stage in the garage. His mechanic's uniform is labeled "Matt," a reference to his real first name, Matthew.

==== Charts ====
===== Weekly charts =====
Chart (2003–2004)	Peak position
New Zealand (Recorded Music NZ)	25
US Billboard Hot 100	9
US Adult Contemporary (Billboard)	1
US Adult Pop Airplay (Billboard)	2
US Pop Airplay (Billboard)	10

===== Year-end charts =====
Chart (2003)	Position
US Billboard Hot 100	19
US Adult Contemporary (Billboard)	3
US Adult Top 40 (Billboard)	2
US Mainstream Top 40 (Billboard)	34

Chart (2004)	Position
US Adult Contemporary (Billboard)	4

==== Certifications ====
Region	Certification	Certified units/sales
New Zealand (RMNZ)	2× Platinum	60,000^{‡}
^{‡} Sales+streaming figures based on certification alone.

=== Release history ===
Region	Date	Format(s)	Label(s)	Ref.
United States	January 27, 2003	Hot adult contemporary radio	Lava	
United States	May 5, 2003	Contemporary hit radio	Lava	

== Other cover versions ==
The Rolling Stones recorded a cover of the song during the sessions for their It's Only Rock 'n Roll LP in 1974, but it did not appear on the finished album. It was finally given an official release in October 2021 as part of the Tattoo You reissue.

Rod Stewart recorded a cover of the song for the album Atlantic Crossing in 1975.

Dolly Parton performed the song with Randy Parton and Anne Murray on her variety show Dolly in 1976.

Ringo Starr recorded "Drift Away" for his 1998 studio album Vertical Man featuring vocals by Tom Petty, Alanis Morissette, and Steven Tyler who also played drums on the track while Ringo played guitar.

Waylon Jennings performed the song during his January 5–6, 2000 performance at The Ryman Auditorium and included it on the album Never Say Die: Live. The performance dropped in October of that year, being the final album released in Jennings' lifetime.

Dustin Lynch's 2023 song "Chevrolet", featuring Jelly Roll, contains lyrics set to the melody of "Drift Away".

== See also ==
- List of Billboard Adult Contemporary number ones of 2003 and 2004 (U.S.)
