= Smile (Uncle Kracker song) =

2009 song by Uncle Kracker

Single by Uncle Kracker

from the album Happy Hour
- Released: July 13, 2009
- Genre: Country
- Length: 3:21
- Label: Atlantic
- Songwriters: Matthew Shafer; Blair Daly; J. T. Harding; Jeremy Bose
- Producer: Rob Cavallo

Uncle Kracker singles chronology
"Writing It Down" (2004)	"Smile" (2009)	"Good to Be Me" (2010)

Music video
- "Smile" on YouTube

"Smile" is a song by American musician Uncle Kracker from his fourth studio album, Happy Hour (2009). It was released as the album's first single on July 13, 2009, and again charted in August 2010. The track features pop rock singer Rae Rae, who sings backing vocals throughout the song and at the end of the title. Commercially, the song reached number 31 on the US Billboard Hot 100, number 44 in Canada, and number three in Australia.

== Chart performance ==
On the chart week of November 7, 2009, the original album version of "Smile" debuted at number 57 on the U.S. Billboard Hot Country Songs chart, becoming his first solo entry on that chart as well as his second chart single since he was featured with Kenny Chesney on "When the Sun Goes Down" in 2004. The song is also his second entry on the Hot Country Songs charts, debuting at number 57 on the week of November 7, 2009. On the Billboard Hot 100, the song reached number 31. Following strong unsolicited airplay of a remix of "Smile" featuring country music influences on Detroit country music stations, "Smile" was re-mixed and released to country radio as an official single to promote his extended play Happy Hour: The South River Road Sessions. It has since become his first solo top-10 country hit, peaking at number six.

Outside the United States, the song charted in a few other countries. In Canada, the song debuted at number 98 on the Canadian Hot 100 on May 15, 2010, and reached number 44 on its 13th week. It then dropped out of the top 100 the next week. In Europe, the song appeared on the charts of Germany and Austria, but did not break the top 30 in either country. The song's highest peak on any country's national chart was in Australia, where it reached number three on the ARIA Singles Chart on July 11, 2010, three weeks after its debut at number 36. It stayed in the top 50 for 14 more weeks, totaling 18 weeks on the chart altogether, and finished 2010 as Australia's 54th-best-selling single.

== Music video ==
A music video for the song was released in September 2009, directed by Darren Doane. The video is set in Northern Michigan with some scenes from Hale and nearby Long Lake.

== Uses on television ==
"Smile" has been featured in promotions for The Office special "Baby" episode as well as TV advertisements for Season 3 of the Australian drama series Packed to the Rafters. Joe McElderry recorded a cover of the song for his album Wide Awake, which was released in October 2010. The song was featured in an episode of the 2009 sequel to Melrose Place. The song was featured in Bucky Larson: Born to Be a Star. Kelly Ripa had the song played to an accompanying montage in tribute to co-host Regis Philbin on his last episode of Live with Regis & Kelly, following his retirement from the series. Cold Stone also used the song in their commercials.

== Charts ==
=== Weekly charts ===
Chart (2009–2010)	Peak position
Australia (ARIA)	3
Austria (Ö3 Austria Top 40)	31
Canada Hot 100 (Billboard)	44
Canada AC (Billboard)	3
Canada Country (Billboard)	13
Canada Hot AC (Billboard)	23
Germany (GfK)	47
US Billboard Hot 100	31
US Adult Contemporary (Billboard)	3
US Adult Pop Airplay (Billboard)	2
US Hot Country Songs (Billboard)	6
US Pop Airplay (Billboard)	30
US Ringtones (Billboard)	8

=== Year-end charts ===
Chart (2009)	Position
US Adult Top 40 (Billboard)	33

Chart (2010)	Position
Australia (ARIA)	54
Austria (Ö3 Austria Top 40)	111
US Billboard Hot 100	97
US Adult Contemporary (Billboard)	4
US Adult Top 40 (Billboard)	35
US Country Songs (Billboard)	27
US Digital Songs (Billboard)	58
US Ringtones (Billboard)	5

Chart (2011)	Position
US Adult Contemporary (Billboard)	34

== Certifications ==
Region	Certification	Certified units/sales
Australia (ARIA)	Platinum	70,000^{^}
Canada (Music Canada)	Gold	40,000^{*}
New Zealand (RMNZ)	Gold	15,000^{‡}
United States (RIAA)	3× Platinum	3,000,000^{‡}
^{*} Sales figures based on certification alone.^{^} Shipments figures based on certification alone.^{‡} Sales+streaming figures based on certification alone.
