= Jesse Lee (singer) =

American singer-songwriter

- Born: Jessica Lee Levin c. 1986 (age 38–39)
- Origin: Palo Alto, California, United States
- Genres: Country
- Occupation(s): Singer, Songwriter
- Instrument: Vocals
- Years active: 2003-present
- Labels: Direct Image; Atlantic/Bigger Picture (Former)

Jesse Lee (born c. 1986) is an American country music singer and songwriter. Signed to Atlantic Nashville in 2007, she released her debut single "It's a Girl Thing" in 2009, which debuted on the Billboard Hot Country Songs chart dated for June 6, 2009. A second single, "Like My Mother Does," was released in 2010, which failed to chart. Jesse and Atlantic Records parted ways after three and a half years together. She is signed as a songwriter with Disney Music Group. In addition to her solo career, Lee co-wrote Kelsea Ballerini's "Peter Pan".

== Biography ==
Jesse Lee was raised in Los Altos, California. Inspired by country music at an early age, she began performing in state festivals by age eleven before her family moved to Florida, eventually serving as an opening act for Ronnie Milsap, Willie Nelson and Clay Walker. By age 14, she had made her first trip to Nashville, Tennessee to collaborate with hit songwriters, as well as record demos. She attended Belmont University's music business program after graduating from high school, meanwhile performing at local songwriters' clubs. She co-wrote and sang the duet "Me Again" on Uncle Kracker's album Happy Hour and wrote the title track to Kristy Lee Cook's debut album Why Wait.

Jesse was living in Nashville at the time but traveled back to Jacksonville, Florida, where Lee was singing at a fair and was discovered by someone who sent her music to the president of Atlantic Records, who upon hearing her demo, flew her to New York and offered her a record deal. Her debut album is produced by Paul Worley, Mark Bright and Nathan Chapman, and it includes her debut single "It's a Girl Thing", which debuted at No. 59 on the U.S. country charts dated for June 6, 2009. The song was also made into a music video, which has aired on CMT.

"It's a Girl Thing" received a favorable review from Matt Bjorke of Roughstock, who said that the song (which she co-wrote with Victoria Banks and Rachel Proctor) had a mainstream sound but showcased Lee's vocals. Karlie Justus of Engine 145 gave it a thumbs-down rating, saying that the song was cliché and stereotyped, although she also described Lee's vocal performance favorably.

In 2016, Lee celebrated her first #1 song, Kelsea Ballerini's "Peter Pan". In 2016, Jesse penned one of the 13 songs on Keith Urban's album RIPCORD, "That Could Still Be Us".

In January 2018, Jesse Lee had her second consecutive #1 song with Brett Young, "Like I Loved You." It was a 3-week Billboard number one which she co-wrote with Brett Young.

In 2022, Dean Brody recorded "You Got the Wrong Guy", which was co-written by Lee.

== Discography ==
=== Albums ===
- Hotel (2015)

=== Singles ===
Year	Single	Peak positions	Album
Year	Single	US Country	Album
2003	"Room to Breathe"	—	Room to Breathe
2009	"It's a Girl Thing"	52	Non-album song
2010	"Like My Mother Does"	—	Non-album song
"—" denotes releases that did not chart

=== Music videos ===
Year	Video	Director
2009	"It's a Girl Thing"	Mark Staubach

=== Other appearances ===
Year	Song	Album
2009	"Me Again" (with Uncle Kracker)	Happy Hour
