= No Stranger to Shame =

Studio album by Uncle Kracker
- Released: August 27, 2002
- Studio: Chunky Style Studios, Burbank, California; Ocean Way, Nashville, Tennessee; (Note: Portions of the album was recorded at an unnamed studio in Mount Clemens, Michigan above the Metry and Metry law office)
- Genre: Hip hop; country; Southern rock
- Length: 45:31
- Label: Lava
- Producer: Kid Rock (exec.); Michael Bradford; Uncle Kracker (co.)

Uncle Kracker chronology
Double Wide (2000)	No Stranger to Shame (2002)	Seventy Two and Sunny (2004)

Singles from No Stranger to Shame
- 1. "In a Little While" Released: August 12, 2002; 2. "Drift Away" Released: January 27, 2003; 3. "Memphis Soul Song" Released: 2003

Professional ratings
Review scores
Source	Rating
AllMusic	4/5 stars
Entertainment Weekly	B−
Los Angeles Times	3/4 stars

No Stranger to Shame is the second studio album by American recording artist Uncle Kracker. It was released on August 27, 2002, via Lava Records. The album peaked at number 43 on the Billboard 200, spawning two charted singles "In a Little While" and "Drift Away" (featuring original singer Dobie Gray), the latter reaching #9 on the Billboard Hot 100 in the United States. It was certified gold by the Recording Industry Association of America on July 29, 2003.

== Music ==
The music of No Stranger to Shame, like its predecessor, features an eclectic sound broadly categorized as rock by AllMusic, and as southern rock by Entertainment Weekly. The album also incorporates elements of hip hop and country. It is his last album to receive a parental advisory label and his last to feature rapping, on the songs "Keep It Comin'" and "No Stranger to Shame".

== Track listing ==
All tracks written by Matthew Shafer and Michael Bradford, except where noted.

No.	Title	Writer(s)	Length
1.	"Keep It Comin'"		3:22
2.	"Thunderhead Hawkins"		3:48
3.	"In a Little While"		4:09
4.	"I Wish I Had a Dollar"		4:04
5.	"Drift Away"	Mentor Williams	4:15
6.	"Baby Don't Cry"		4:26
7.	"I Do"		3:11
8.	"Memphis Soul Song"	Shafer; Bradford; Martin "Tino" Gross	3:58
9.	"I Don't Know"		3:57
10.	"To Think I Used to Love You"		3:29
11.	"Letter to My Daughters"	Shafer; Bradford; David Allan Coe	3:08
12.	"No Stranger to Shame"		3:40
Total length:			45:31

== Personnel ==
- Matthew Shafer – lead vocals, co-producer
- Jimmie "Bones" Trombly – background vocals (tracks 2, 10), organ & piano (tracks: 1, 8), drums (track 9)
- Michael Bradford – background vocals (tracks: 4, 10), additional vocals (tracks: 5, 12), keyboards (tracks: 1–9, 11–12), guitar (tracks: 1–11, 12), bass guitar (tracks: 1–9, 12), drums (tracks: 2–4, 8), mixing, producer
- Dobie Gray – vocals (track 5)
- Beth Hart – background vocals (track 7)
- Mark McGrath – additional vocals (track 12)
- Richard Baker – piano (track 5)
- Dean Parks – guitar (tracks: 5, 10)
- Philip Sayce – guitar (track 6)
- Wanda Vick – dobro, fiddle and mandolin (track 10)
- Jimmy Johnson – bass guitar (track 10)
- Larry Paxton – upright bass (track 11)
- Russ Kunkel – drums (tracks: 5, 10)
- Scott Krauss – drums (track 6)
- Jeffrey Fowlkes – drums (tracks: 7, 8)
- Dan Higgins – saxophone (track 7)
- Bill Reichenbach Jr. – saxophone (track 7)
- Jerry Hey – trumpet (track 7)
- Robert James Ritchie – executive producer
- Andy VanDette – mastering
- F. Scott Shafer – photography

== Charts ==
Chart (2002)	Peak position
Austrian Albums (Ö3 Austria)	70
German Albums (Offizielle Top 100)	92
US Billboard 200	43

=== Year-end charts ===
Chart (2002)	Position
Canadian Alternative Albums (Nielsen SoundScan)	186

== Certifications ==
Region	Certification	Certified units/sales
United States (RIAA)	Gold	500,000^{^}
^{^} Shipments figures based on certification alone.
