= Mentor Williams =

American songwriter (1946–2016)

- Born: Mentor Ralph Williams; June 11, 1946; Omaha, Nebraska, U.S.
- Died: November 16, 2016 (aged 70) Taos, New Mexico, U.S.
- Genres: Country
- Occupation: Songwriter

Mentor Ralph Williams (June 11, 1946 – November 16, 2016) was an American songwriter and producer. He is best known for writing "Drift Away", a popular song first performed by Mike Berry in 1972 and popularized by Dobie Gray the following year, and which has since been covered by multiple artists. He also co-wrote the chart-topping song "When We Make Love", recorded by the American country music band Alabama in 1984. He was the brother of songwriter and actor Paul Williams.

== Early life ==
Williams was born in Omaha, Nebraska, the son of Paul Hamilton Williams, an architectural engineer, and his wife, Bertha Mae (née Burnside), a homemaker.

His father died in a car accident in 1953, when Williams was 7 years old, after which the Williams family moved to Long Beach, California, to live with an aunt.

One of his brothers is John J. Williams, a NASA rocket scientist, who participated in the Mercury and Apollo programs and who was awarded the NASA Distinguished Service Medal, their highest honor, in 1969. His other brother is Paul Williams, a Songwriter's Hall of Fame inductee.

== Career ==
Williams pursued a songwriting career in which he received an ASCAP award for his 30 years of songwriting, and won 17 other writing awards.

Williams maintained an office at Almo-Irving, in Los Angeles, as staff writer in the late 1960s. He produced for A&M, MCA, RSO and Columbia Records, commuting between Los Angeles, Nashville, and London.

He worked at The Record Plant with Paul McCartney and Kenney Jones and at Apple Studios in London with Stealers Wheel and Gerry Rafferty. He produced albums for his brother, as well as for Kim Carnes, John Stewart, and Dobie Gray for who he wrote the standard "Drift Away", among others. Williams was also a post-production/remix engineer for The Muppet Movie, which won a Grammy Award and an Academy Award, and also worked on the Butch Cassidy and the Sundance Kid soundtrack. He also produced five songs by the Textones, one of which appeared on their album Through the Canyon (Rhino Records).

== Personal life ==
Williams built a home overlooking Taos, New Mexico, which he shared with country music singer Lynn Anderson; the two were in a romantic relationship from the 1980s until her death in 2015.

He held numerous songwriting seminars and lectures at the college level, in an attempt to help up-and-coming writers learn the craft of putting words and music together.

Williams died in 2016 of lung cancer, at age 70, at his home in Taos.
