= J. T. Harding =

American country music songwriter

- Born: John Thomas Harding
- Origin: Nashville, Tennessee, U.S.
- Genres: Country, pop, rock
- Occupation: Songwriter
- Years active: 2000s-present

John Thomas Harding is an American country music songwriter. He has written songs for Uncle Kracker, Kenny Chesney, Keith Urban, Blake Shelton, Dierks Bentley, and Darius Rucker.

== History ==
Harding is the biological son of actor and comedian Jay Thomas, who put him up for adoption at an early age (the two later met and reconciled). His adoptive parents, Larry and Kendra Harding, moved from Nashville to Grosse Pointe, Michigan when Harding was young. Harding's adoptive father worked at a rock music radio station in Detroit. In the late 1990s, Harding moved to California, where he worked at Tower Records. He also competed on Rock & Roll Jeopardy! He performed and released music under the stage name JTX.

Harding moved to Nashville at the suggestion of a song publisher while working as an assistant for the band Linkin Park. After that, Harding co-wrote Uncle Kracker's "Smile". He has also written number one songs for other country music artists including Darius Rucker, Keith Urban, Dierks Bentley, Blake Shelton, and Kenny Chesney.

== Discography ==
(as JTX)

=== Albums ===
| Year | Album | Record label |
|---|---|---|
| 2009 | From Detroit With Love | Next Plateau Entertainment |
| 2020 | Empire | self-published |

=== Singles ===
| Year | Single | Record label |
|---|---|---|
| 2009 | "(I'm Gonna) Party Like a Rockstar" | Next Plateau Entertainment |
| 2010 | "Love In America" | Next Plateau Entertainment |
| 2012 | "Seven Day Weekend" | Next Plateau Entertainment |
| 2013 | "Summer Lover" | Next Plateau Entertainment |
