= Uncle Kracker =

American musician (born 1974)

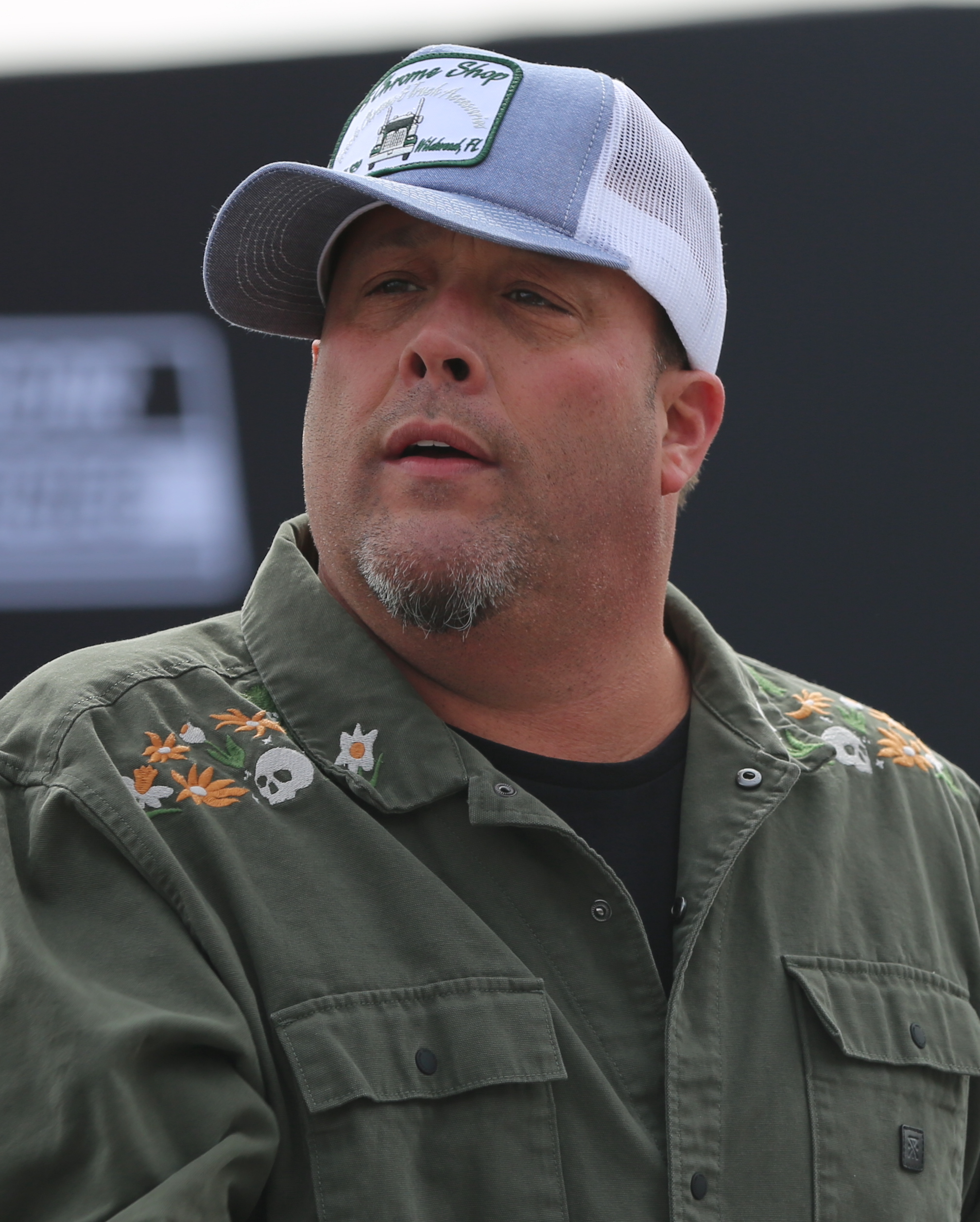
- Uncle Kracker performing at Las Vegas Motor Speedway in 2023

Background information
- Born: Matthew Shafer; June 6, 1974 (age 52); Mount Clemens, Michigan, U.S.
- Genres: Country rock; pop rock; rap rock; country rap
- Occupations: Singer; songwriter; musician; rapper
- Instruments: Vocals; turntables
- Years active: 1992–present
- Labels: Atlantic; Lava; Sugar Hill; Top Dog
- Formerly of: Twisted Brown Trucker
- Website: unclekracker.com

Matthew Shafer (born June 6, 1974), also known by his stage name Uncle Kracker, is an American singer and musician. He came to prominence in the 1990s as a turntablist for Kid Rock's backing group Twisted Brown Trucker and launched a solo career in 1999. He is best known for his singles "Follow Me", "Drift Away", and "Smile" – all of which peaked within the top 40 of the Billboard Hot 100.

== Early life ==
Shafer was born in Mount Clemens, Michigan, on June 6, 1974. With his brother Mike Shafer, he visited a nightclub in Clawson, Michigan, where a turntables competition was occurring. His older brother was competing against a then-unknown musician, Kid Rock, with whom Shafer soon became friends. In those times, he was mainly rapping. He went to L'Anse Creuse High School. In 1994, Kid Rock asked Shafer to play turntables for his band called Twisted Brown Trucker. Shafer knew nothing of using turntables, but since his brother was an experienced DJ, he agreed. He only performed at live shows at the time, until he began recording for Rock's album, Early Mornin' Stoned Pimp; Shafer was a featured vocalist on some of the tracks. He then began working on a solo album, but he continued being the DJ for Kid Rock. Upon the release of Rock's multi-platinum album, The History of Rock, Shafer decided that it was time to release his first solo album, Double Wide, in 2000.

== Career ==
=== Double Wide ===
Double Wide was Uncle Kracker's first solo album. Released on June 30, 2000, it peaked at Number 7 on the Billboard 200 album chart and is Shafer's most successful and highest-selling album. The album was produced by Kid Rock, with mixing additional production by Michael Bradford. The first single taken off the album was "Follow Me", which was co-written with Bradford, and peaked at Number 5 on the Billboard Hot 100 in June 2001. The album spent the next 10 months on the Billboard 200, and "Follow Me" also had a long chart run. His second single, "Yeah, Yeah, Yeah", failed to hit the Hot 100 chart; however, the song has been released one year earlier in the soundtrack of Shanghai Noon. Double Wide was certified 2× multi-platinum on November 29, 2001.

=== No Stranger to Shame ===
After a great deal of touring to promote the first album, he began to work on a follow-up album. Entitled No Stranger to Shame, it was released on August 27, 2002. The album reached No. 43 on the Billboard albums chart. A hit single was released, a cover version of Dobie Gray's 1973 Top 5 hit, "Drift Away" – also including Gray as a guest vocalist. Kracker's version of this song peaked at No. 9 on the Hot 100 one week to the day after Gray's 63rd birthday, and it set a record for most weeks at No. 1 on the Adult Contemporary chart, remaining atop this chart for 28 nonconsecutive weeks. Other singles released from No Stranger to Shame include "In A Little While", which peaked at No. 59 on the Hot 100 and No. 26 on the Adult Contemporary charts. A third single was released, "Memphis Soul Song", which charted on the Adult Top 40 at No. 35. A special remix of "Memphis Soul Song" was also released, featuring harmonies by legendary singing group The Jordanaires, who had famously sung harmonies with Elvis Presley. The album was certified gold by the RIAA within a year of its release. Soon after this period, Kracker became good friends with country music star Kenny Chesney and the two began a successful touring partnership together, brought on by the success of Kenny's hit single "When the Sun Goes Down", featuring Uncle Kracker both on the single, and prominently in the video.

=== Seventy Two and Sunny ===
After touring, Shafer began working on a third album which he called Seventy Two and Sunny. It was his first not to feature a parental advisory label as well as the first one to not feature any hip-hop songs, and moved onto a pure country sound. The album featured two singles: "Rescue", which only charted at No. 20 on the Billboard Adult Contemporary singles chart but did not chart on any other charts, and "Writing It Down," which did not chart at all. Shafer did have some success that year though when he was featured on Chesney's track, "When the Sun Goes Down", which peaked at No. 1 on the Hot Country Songs chart, and went on to achieve Gold status. Seventy Two and Sunny has sold about 200,000 copies. It peaked at No. 39 on the Billboard 200.

=== Happy Hour ===
Uncle Kracker's fourth studio album is entitled Happy Hour. The album was in the works for five years and was delayed due to Atlantic Records' decision to bring in Rob Cavallo to produce the album right as they were finishing their cut of the album in late 2007. An early promo version of the album contained the tracks "Happy Hour", "Vegas Baby", "I'm Not Leaving", "The One That Got Away", and "That's What's Happenin". "Smile," the first single from the album, was released on July 13, 2009, and has peaked at No. 31 on the Billboard Hot 100. The album was released on September 15, 2009. "Smile" also became his first solo entry on the Hot Country Songs chart, where it debuted at No. 57 for the week of November 7, 2009, and peaked at No. 6 in September 2010. A music video for the track "My Girlfriend" was released in November 2009. The album also features country singer Jesse Lee (also on Atlantic Records) in a duet they wrote called "Me Again."

==== Happy Hour: The South River Road Sessions ====
A six-song EP, Happy Hour: The South River Road Sessions, was released on June 22, 2010. The EP features country remakes of songs off the Happy Hour album. The singles released were a remake of "Smile" and "Good to Be Me", featuring Kid Rock.

=== Midnight Special ===
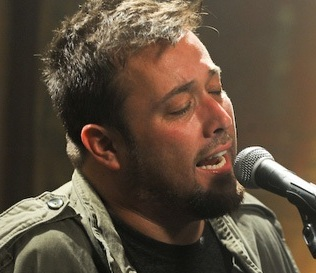
Uncle Kracker performing in 2012

On November 16, 2012, Uncle Kracker released his fifth studio album, Midnight Special, produced by Keith Stegall. Sugar Hill Records and Vanguard Records released the album under parent company Welk Music Group. The album was a full-fledged country record, and was his first that did not feature the involvement of Kid Rock in any capacity. The first single to come off of the album was "Nobody's Sad on a Saturday Night", followed by "Blue Skies". Shafer performed songs from the album while on the road with Kid Rock for his $20 Best Night Ever Tour during 2013.

=== New singles and Coffee & Beer (2018–present) ===
On August 10, 2018, Kracker released his new single entitled "Floatin'", along with an accompanying music video.

On May 4, 2020, "No Time to Be Sober" premiered with a simple lockdown music video. On December 21, 2020, "Silver Bells" released for Christmas.

On June 9, 2023, Uncle Kracker released the single "Sweet 16".

On July 20, 2023, "Reason to Drink" was released.

Uncle Kracker toured with Lynyrd Skynyrd and ZZ Top on their Sharp Dressed Simple Man Tour, which commenced on July 21, 2023 in West Palm Beach and concluded on September 17 in Camden.

On October 19, 2023, "Cruising Altitude" released after the finished tour.

"Beach Chair," Uncle's latest single with accompanying video directed by The Manning Brothers, was released on May 31, 2024.

On July 12, 2024, Uncle Kracker released his first album in a decade entitled Coffee & Beer.

== Personal life ==
Shafer was married to Melanie Haas from 1998 to 2013. They had three children together. Shafer has two children with his second wife.

In 2007, Shafer was arrested for a second-degree sex offense charge and released on $75,000 bond after a 26-year old woman alleged he groped her at a nightclub. He pleaded guilty to a lesser charge and was sentenced to a year of probation, saying he did touch the woman but denying any sexual intent and claiming the incident happened after the woman bumped into him at the club.

== Awards and nominations ==
| Award | Year | Nominee(s) | Category | Result | Ref. |
|---|---|---|---|---|---|
| BMI Pop Awards | 2001 | "Only God Knows Why" | Award-Winning Songs | Won | |
| BMI Pop Awards | 2002 | "Follow Me" | Award-Winning Songs | Won | |
| BMI Pop Awards | 2003 | "Follow Me" | Award-Winning Songs | Won | |
| CMT Music Awards | 2004 | "Drift Away" (with Dobie Gray) | Collaborative Video of the Year | Nominated | |
| Detroit Music Awards | 2001 | Double Wide | Outstanding National Album | Nominated | |
| Detroit Music Awards | 2001 | "Yeah, Yeah, Yeah" | Outstanding National Single | Nominated | |
| Detroit Music Awards | 2010 | Happy Hour | Outstanding Major Label Recording | Nominated | |
| Detroit Music Awards | 2010 | "Smile" | Outstanding National Single | Won | |
| Detroit Music Awards | 2010 | "Smile" | Outstanding Video | Nominated | |
| Detroit Music Awards | 2011 | "Good to Be Me" (with Kid Rock) | Outstanding National Single | Nominated | |
| Detroit Music Awards | 2011 | "Good to Be Me" (with Kid Rock) | Outstanding Video | Nominated | |
| Teen Choice Awards | 2001 | "Follow Me" | Choice Rock Track | Nominated | |
| Teen Choice Awards | 2001 | North American Tour (with Sugar Ray) | Choice Concert | Nominated | |

== Discography ==
- Double Wide (2000)
- No Stranger to Shame (2002)
- Seventy Two and Sunny (2004)
- Happy Hour (2009)
- Midnight Special (2012)
- Coffee & Beer (2024)
