= Dobie Gray =

American singer and songwriter (1940–2011)

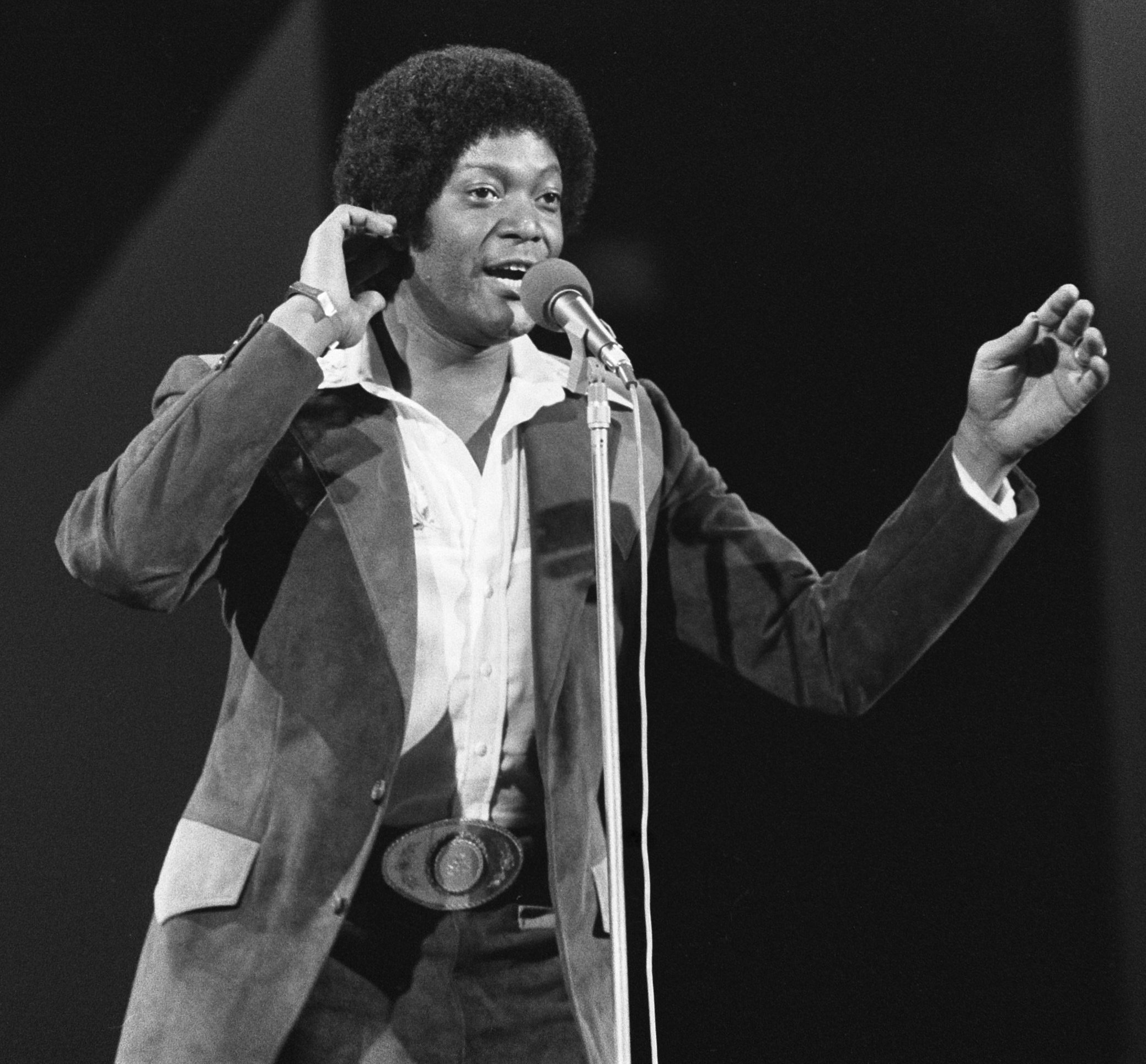
- Gray performing in the Netherlands in 1974

Background information
- Also known as: Leonard Ainsworth; Larry Curtis; Larry Dennis; Larry Brown
- Born: Lawrence Darrow Brown; July 26, 1940; Simonton, Texas, U.S.
- Died: December 6, 2011 (aged 71) Nashville, Tennessee, U.S.
- Genres: Soul; R&B; pop; country
- Occupations: Singer; songwriter; record producer
- Instrument: Vocals
- Years active: 1960–2011
- Labels: Decca, White Whale Infinity
- Website: www.dobiegray.com

Dobie Gray (born Lawrence Darrow Brown; July 26, 1940 – December 6, 2011) was an American singer and songwriter. Gray's music spanned multiple genres, including soul, country, pop, and musical theater. His hit songs included "The 'In' Crowd" in 1965 and "Drift Away" (a cover of a song written by Mentor Williams). "Drift Away" was one of the biggest hits of 1973, has sold over one million copies, and remains a staple of radio airplay.

Dobie Gray was a member of the cast of Hair at the Aquarius Theater in Hollywood from 1968 to 1969.

== Background ==
Gray was born in Simonton, Texas. His birth name was most likely Lawrence Darrow Brown, listed in Fort Bend County birth records as being born in 1940 to Jane and Jethro C. Brown. Other sources suggest he may have been born Leonard Victor Ainsworth, a name he used on some early recordings.

His family sharecropped. He discovered gospel music through his grandfather, a Baptist minister.

== Career ==
In the early 1960s Gray moved to Los Angeles, intending to pursue an acting career while also singing to make money. He recorded for several local labels under the names Leonard Ainsworth, Larry Curtis, and Larry Dennis, before Sonny Bono directed him toward the small independent Stripe Records. They suggested that he record under the name "Dobie Gray", an allusion to the then-popular sitcom The Many Loves of Dobie Gillis.

His first taste of success came in 1962 when his seventh single "Look At Me", on the Cor-Dak label and recorded with bassist Carol Kaye, reached No. 91 on the Billboard Hot 100.

However, his first album Look! failed to sell. Greater success came in early 1965 when his original recording of "The 'In' Crowd" (recorded later that year as an instrumental by Ramsey Lewis and also covered in 1965 by Petula Clark) reached No. 13. Written by Billy Page and arranged by his brother Gene and produced by Fred Darian, Gray's record reached No. 11 on the US R&B chart and No. 25 in the UK. The follow-up, "See You at the Go-Go", recorded with such top session musicians as Kaye, Hal Blaine, and Larry Knechtel, also reached the Hot 100, and he issued an album, Dobie Gray Sings for 'In' Crowders That Go 'Go Go,' which featured some self-penned songs.

Dobie sang the title song, (Out of Sight) Out on the Floor from the film Out of Sight (1966) that featured on the soundtrack album.

Gray continued to record, albeit with little success, for small labels such as Charger and White Whale, as well as contributing to movie soundtracks. He also spent several years working as an actor, including two and a half years in the Los Angeles production of Hair.

In 1970, while working there, he joined the band Pollution as singer and percussionist. They were managed by actor Max Baer Jr. (best known as "Jethro" in The Beverly Hillbillies) and released two albums of soul-inspired psychedelic rock, Pollution I and Pollution II. The band included singer Tata Vega and guitarist/singer James Quill Smith. He also worked at A&M Records on demo recordings with songwriter Paul Williams.

In 1972, he signed a recording contract with Decca Records (shortly before it became part of MCA) to make an album with producer Mentor Williams—Paul's brother—in Nashville. Among the songs they recorded at the Quadrafonic Sound Studios, co-owned by session musicians Norbert Putnam and David Briggs, was Mentor Williams's "Drift Away", featuring a guitar riff by Reggie Young. Released as a single, the song rose to No. 5 on the US pop chart and remains Dobie Gray's signature song. It placed at No. 17 in the Billboard Year-End Hot 100 singles of 1973, sold over 1 million copies, and was awarded a gold disc by the RIAA on July 5, 1973. The follow-up, a version of Tom Jans's much-covered song "Loving Arms", hit No. 61. Gray also released three albums with MCA, Drift Away, Loving Arms, and Hey, Dixie, but later stated that MCA were unsure of how to market the albums -- "They didn't know where to place a black guy in country music."

In the mid-1970s, he moved permanently to Nashville and signed with Capricorn Records, writing songs in collaboration with Troy Seals. His last solo hit singles were "If Love Must Go", No. 78 in 1976, and "You Can Do It", No. 37 in 1978. He increasingly concentrated on songwriting, writing songs for a variety of artists including Ray Charles, George Jones, Johnny Mathis, Charley Pride, and Don Williams. He also toured in Europe, Australia and Africa in the 1970s. He performed in South Africa only after persuading the apartheid authorities to allow him to play to integrated audiences, becoming the first artist to do so. His popularity in South Africa continued through numerous subsequent concert tours.

In 1981, Dobie Gray was included on a Word Records/Myrrh Contemporary Christian Music showcase called Premier Performance. Dobie was featured on two selections: "Everything To Me" and Walter Carter's "Last Train to Glory".

Dobie Gray re-emerged as a recording artist for Capitol Records in the mid-1980s, recording with producer Harold Shedd. He placed two singles on the US country chart in 1986–87, including "That's One to Grow On" which peaked at No. 35. His country albums included From Where I Stand in 1986, and he made several appearances at Charlie Daniels's popular Volunteer Jam concerts. He also sang on a number of TV and radio jingles. Gray sang the song "Paradise Road", which appeared in the 1988 film Blind Justice, starring Christopher Cazenove, Patrick Shai, Oliver Reed and Edita Brychta.

In 1997, he released the album Diamond Cuts, including both new songs and re-recordings of older material.

In 2000, Wigan Casino DJ Kev Roberts, compiled The Northern Soul Top 500, which was based on a survey of Northern soul fans. Gray's "Out on the Floor", a 1966 recording which would become a British hit in 1975, peaking at No. 42.

"Drift Away" became a hit again in 2003, when he covered the song as a duet with Uncle Kracker on the latter's No Stranger to Shame album. The re-recording peaked at No. 9 one week to the day after Gray's 63rd birthday and placed at No. 19 in the Billboard Year-End Hot 100 singles of 2003 as well as logging a record-setting 28 weeks atop the Adult Contemporary chart in 2003–04.

== Death ==
Gray died on December 6, 2011, of complications from cancer surgery in Nashville, Tennessee, aged 71. His remains were buried at Woodlawn Memorial Park And Mausoleum in Nashville. Upon his death, he bequeathed 100% of his musical assets and royalties in trust to benefit St. Jude Children's Research Hospital and the Tennessee School for the Blind.

== Discography ==
=== Albums ===
Year	Album	Chart positions			Label
Year	Album	US	US R&B	AUS	Label
1963	Look	—	—	—	Stripe
1965	Dobie Gray Sings for "In" Crowders That Go "Go-Go"	—	—	—	Charger
1970	Pollution (as lead singer)	—	—	—	Prophecy/Atlantic
1971	Pollution II (as lead singer)	—	—	—	Prophecy/Atlantic
1973	Drift Away	64	—	63	Decca/MCA
1973	Loving Arms	188	—	—	MCA
1975	Hey Dixie	—	—	94	MCA
1975	New Ray of Sunshine	—	—	—	Capricorn
1977	Let Go	—	—	—	Capricorn
1978	The Best of Dobie Gray	—	—	—	Gallo
1978	Dobie Gray & Mary Wells	—	—	—	Gusto Inc.
1978	Mellow Man	—	—	—	Capricorn
1978	Midnight Diamond	174	72	89	Infinity
1979	Dobie Gray	—	—	—	Infinity
1981	Welcome Home	—	—	—	Equity/Robox
1981	Premiere Performance	—	—	—	Myrrh
1986	From Where I Stand	—	—	—	Capitol/EMI
1987	Love's Talkin'	—	—	—	Capitol/EMI
1996	Dobie Gray: His Very Best	—	—	—	Razor & Tie
1998	Diamond Cuts	—	—	—	Dobie Gray Prods.
2001	Soul Days	—	—	—	CDMemphis
2001	Dobie Gray: The Ultimate	—	—	—	Universal Hip-O
2001	Songs of the Season	—	—	—	Dobie Gray Prods.
2005	Dobie Gray: A Decade of Dobie (1969–1979)	—	—	—	UMG/Select-O-Hits
"—" denotes releases that did not chart.

=== Chart singles ===
Year	Single	Peak chart positions									Certifications (sales threshold)
Year	Single	US	US R&B	US AC	US Country	AUS	CAN	CAN AC	CAN Country	UK	Certifications (sales threshold)
1963	"Look at Me"	91	—	—	—	—	—	—	—	—	
1965	"The 'In' Crowd"	13	11	—	—	—	8	—	—	25	
1965	"See You at the Go-Go"	69	—	—	—	—	—	—	—	—	
1969	"Rose Garden"	119	—	—	—	—	89	—	—	—	
1973	"Drift Away"	5	42	12	—	44	7	—	—	—	US: Gold
1973	"Loving Arms"	61	81	7	—	—	67	2	—	—	
1973	"Good Old Song"	103	—	—	—	—	—	—	—	—	
1974	"Watch Out for Lucy"	107	—	—	—	—	—	—	—	—	
1975	"Roll On Sweet Mississippi"	—	—	—	—	84	—	—	—	—	
1975	"Out on the Floor"	—	—	—	—	—	—	—	—	42	
1976	"If Love Must Go"	78	—	—	—	—	—	—	—	—	
1976	"Find 'Em, Fool 'Em & Forget 'Em"	94	71	—	—	—	—	—	—	—	
1979	"You Can Do It"	37	32	—	—	96	58	—	—	—	
1979	"The In Crowd"	—	—	—	—	—	—	47	—	—	
1986	"That's One to Grow On"	—	—	—	35	—	—	—	—	—	
1986	"The Dark Side of Town"	—	—	—	42	—	—	—	48	—	
1986	"From Where I Stand"	—	—	—	67	—	—	—	—	—	
1987	"Take It Real Easy"	—	—	—	82	—	—	—	—	—	
"—" denotes releases that did not chart or were not released to that country

=== Featured singles ===
Year	Single	Artist	Peak chart positions						Album
Year	Single	Artist	US	US Country	US Adult	US AC	US Pop	NZ	Album
1985	"One Big Family"	Heart of Nashville	—	61	—	—	—	—	single only
2003	"Drift Away"	Uncle Kracker	9	—	2	1	10	25	No Stranger to Shame

=== Music videos ===
Year	Video	Director
1985	"One Big Family" (Heart of Nashville)	Steve Von Hagel

== See also ==
- List of soul musicians
- List of disco artists (A-E)
- List of Decca Records artists
