= Adult (disambiguation) =

An adult is a human or other organism that has reached the mature developmental stage.

Adult may also refer to:

- Adult (band), an American rock band
- Adult (album), a 2006 album by Tokyo Jihen
- Adult (magazine), a magazine of erotic art and literature
- Adults (TV series), a 2025 ensemble comedy series

== See also ==
- Adulthood (disambiguation)
- Man (disambiguation)
- Woman (disambiguation)
- Mature (disambiguation)
- Maturation (disambiguation)
- Maturity (disambiguation)
