= Womanhood (disambiguation) =

Womanhood is the state of being a woman.

Womanhood may also refer to:

- Femininity, a set of attributes, behaviors, and roles typically associated with girls and women
- Womanhood (album), a 1978 album by Tammy Wynette
  - "Womanhood" (song), the title track of the album

== See also ==
- Adulthood (disambiguation)
- Manhood (disambiguation)
- Woman (disambiguation)
