= Sam McKinniss =

American painter

- Born: 1985 (age 40–41); Northfield, Minnesota
- Known for: Painting
- Website: sammckinniss.com

Sam McKinniss (born 1985) is an American abstract and figurative postmodern painter based in Brooklyn.

== Education ==
Sam McKinniss was born in Minnesota and grew up in Connecticut. He graduated from the Glasgow School of Art, Glasgow, Scotland in 2005. He received a BFA in painting from the Hartford Art School in Hartford, Connecticut in 2007, and an MFA from the Steinhardt School at New York University in 2013.

== Work ==
Sam McKinniss, White Roses in a Short Glass (after Fantin-Latour), 2016, oil and acrylic on canvas, 9" x 12"

McKinniss's work has been shown in galleries and museums since 2005.

His first solo show in New York, entitled "Black Leather Sectional," opened at Joe Sheftel Gallery in May 2015 and his first solo show in Los Angeles, "Dear Metal Thing," opened at Team Bungalow in June 2015. His show "Egyptian Violet" opened at Team Gallery in New York in October 2016. He made his first appearance at the Miami edition of the international art fair Art Basel in 2015.

In his figurative painting, which has become the dominant practice, McKinniss works from photographs, found images as well as pictures he took. His subjects include reclining male nudes, images from popular culture, and floral still lifes. McKinniss develops a symbolist vocabulary for contemporary figurative painting; he sources material primarily from online image searching.

McKinniss has made a large number of paintings that draw on the still-lifes of the 19th-century artist Henri Fantin-Latour, for example, White Roses in a Short Glass (after Fantin-Latour). Latour’s influence on his style can be seen in the heightened color contrasts with which he paints his figurative paintings.

McKinniss painted a series of "men in repose" for the second issue of Adult. His painting of Lorde was the cover art of her 2017 album Melodrama. NME magazine selected the cover for their list of the best album art of the 21st century so far and it received praise from commentators at Billboard, Paste, and Fuse.

== Exhibitions ==
=== Solo exhibitions ===
- Dear Metal Thing, Team (Bungalow), Venice, California, 2015
- Egyptian Violet, Team Gallery, New York, New York, October 2016
- Daisy Chain, Team (Bungalow), Venice Beach, California, January 7 – February 25, 2018

=== Group exhibitions ===
- 1999: A Group Exhibition, The Fireplace Project, East Hampton, New York, 2016
- Catastrophe, Albert Merola Gallery, Provincetown, Massachusetts, 2016 (curated by John Waters)
- BOTÁNICA, Curated by Todd Von Ammon, Berggruen Gallery, San Francisco, California, 2017

== Award ==
- New Boston Fund Individual Artist Fellowship, Greater Hartford Arts Council, Hartford, Connecticut, 2009
