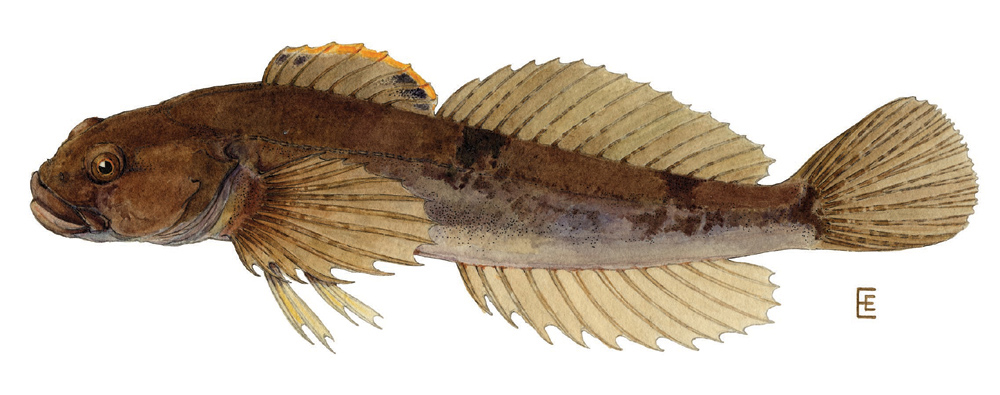

Conservation status
- Least Concern (IUCN 3.1)

Scientific classification
- Kingdom: Animalia
- Phylum: Chordata
- Class: Actinopterygii
- Division: Teleostei
- Order: Perciformes
- Suborder: Cottoidei
- Family: Cottidae
- Genus: Cottus
- Species: C. cognatus

Binomial name
- Cottus cognatus J. Richardson, 1836

Synonyms
- Cottus cognatus cognatus Richardson, 1836; Cottus gracilis Heckel, 1837; Uranidea gracilis (Heckel, 1837); Uranidea quiescens DeKay, 1842; Cottus franklini Agassiz, 1850; Uranidea franklini (Agassiz, 1850); Cottus boleoides Girard, 1850; Uranidea boleoides (Girard, 1850); Cottus formosus Girard, 1851; Uranidea formosa (Girard, 1851); Uranidea hoyi Putnam, 1876; Cottus philonips C. H. Eigenmann & Eigenmann, 1892; Cottus chamberlaini Evermann & Goldsborough, 1907; Cottus kaganowskii Berg, 1932

= Slimy sculpin =

Species of fish

This image displays the distribution of much of the slimy sculpin population in green, across North America

The slimy sculpin (Cottus cognatus) is a freshwater species of fish belonging to the family Cottidae, the largest family of the sculpin. They tend to occupy colder streams and lakes across much of the Northern United States and also parts of Siberia, Russia. The slimy sculpin are nocturnal fish that spend majority of their lives on the bottoms of water bodies, amongst rocks and sediment. Additionally, the slimy sculpin can be mistaken for the close relatives the mottled sculpin which are all species of freshwater fish. The main differentiation of the slimy sculpin is the mottled coloration, the specific microhabitats they occupy, and the appearance of hopping, due to their inefficient swim pattern. The slimy sculpin feeds primarily on aquatic invertebrates and insect larva and nymphs, thus serving as a predator of smaller organisms and prey for larger fish.

Furthermore, the species is of interest to scientific studies, due to their lack of movement, which makes them ideal candidates for studies involving environmental impacts. The fish has been studied in waters where there is current freshwater acidification. Sculpin were found to be less active and have lower rates of reproduction when found in these waters. For these reasons, slimy sculpin have been identified as a good indicator species for changes in acidification among lakes, ponds, and streams.

== Distribution ==
Slimy sculpin is a native species to much of the United States, Canada, and parts of Russia. The greatest quantity of slimy sculpin in North America resides primarily within Lake Superior and Lake Michigan, as well as subgroups within the tributaries. Additionally, the species can be located within much of the Northern United States, including Alaska, and almost the entirety of Canada and eastern parts of Siberia, Russia. Additionally, in larger bodies of water such as the Great Lakes, as they are deeper, the slimy sculpins are found in much deeper depths than their close competitor, the round goby. By shifting their specific depth in deeper regions, they avoided competition and competitive exclusion.

== Physical description ==
The slimy sculpin displays a mottled color amongst the entirety of its body, in addition to that they arrange from brown, green, or gray tones to their coloration. The head of the fish is rather large in comparison to its body, whilst thinning towards the tail. Additively, they exhibit 7-10 dorsal spines, 14-19 dorsal soft rays, 10-14 anal soft rays, and 30-35 vertebrae. Expanding upon those features, the species also contains a short lateral line that stops abruptly under the second dorsal fin. The mouth contains very fine conical teeth on the top and bottom jaws. The slimy sculpin is often compared to the mottled sculpin, roundnose gobies, and tubenose gobies. The slimy sculpin also displays a unique lack of a swim bladder, which can be connected to why it is a bottom-dweller, and why it swims in partial bursts opposed to a continuous swimming motion. In addition to that, the sculpin family itself differs from gobies, as sculpin possess two separate pelvic fins, whereas the gobies have a fused singular pelvic fin, which is an example of convergent evolution between the two genus. Slimy sculpin after maturity tends be from 5-8 centimeters in size, and roughly 3-5 centimeters in size when juveniles. The weight associated with the adult fish range from 3-7 grams or 0.11–0.25 ounces. There is no conclusive measurement recorded for the largest slimy sculpin. The fish are colored so that they will be camouflaged within their environment when they sit still, which is advantageous to their survival.

== Habitat ==
Slimy sculpins tend to inhabit inland wetland habitats with vast amounts of oxygen present through stable flow and lower water temperatures with minimal thermal fluctuation, more specifically rippling rocky-bottom streams, flowing cold springs, and stone covered non-stagnant lakes, typically at far deeper depths (90-106 meters). Additionally, they can also be found within brackish streams, although only for short periods of time only to feed. They are found in greatest quantities in undisturbed bodies of sediment, which are ideal for nesting. Additionally, slimy sculpins prefer temperatures between 9-16 °C and face the initial lethal temperature of 22 °C. This species moves to shallower currents when nesting at night in order to lay eggs, as they are nocturnal, in sheltered and protected areas, where they then rely upon the male to guard the nest from predators. Although the pair themselves will not travel more than 20 meters and prefer to stay within a 10-20 meter range from their nesting site at all times. They will rarely switch between microhabitats, and oftentimes occupy the same pools once maturity is reached.

== Reproduction ==
In order for the slimy sculpin to reproduce, they need conditions such as water to be a specific temperature range from 45-55 degrees Fahrenheit. During breeding season (April-May) the male slimy sculpins tend to get more distinguished darkness along their sides, as well as a more noticeably orange first dorsal fin. This display of sexual dimorphism amongst the species causes the males to no longer camouflage into their environments as well and causes a higher mortality rate for the males. Additionally, the males must find a proper nesting site for their mate or mates to build their nest. Often times this location will be underneath a ledge, rocks, or even under submerged roots. Once the location is prepared, the males will then mate with one or more female, which will produce up to 1,400 adhesive, pink or yellow eggs in the nest. The male is then also in charge of protecting the nest from predation and from any other males, as they undergo intrasexual competition amongst each other in order to reproduce with the most females. The males must fan debris and keep the eggs clean in order for them to hatch. The males will continue to guard the nest for around 4 weeks, or until the eggs hatch, yet they will still protect the young until they are able to feed for themselves. The slimy sculpin reach maturity after 2-4 years, and have a lifespan of 4-7 years, yet it varies due to the different environmental factors they experience.

== Diet ==
The slimy sculpins are nocturnal ambush predators that prey primarily upon aquatic immature invertebrates, but they also eat small crustaceans, aquatic vegetation, and other small fish. The specific benthic invertebrates that are consumed include mayflies, caddis flies, stoneflies, and dragonflies.

== Conservation status ==
The biggest threats facing the slimy sculpin are abiotic factors including the amounts of dissolved oxygen within water, the lack of proper shelter and coarse non-mobile sediments, and the most lethal being water temperature, as they require cold-moving water to survive. Although the slimy sculpin is currently a species of low concern when it comes to threatened species, they are still considered an indicator species, as they are very intolerant of variations to water quality, such as turbidity and acidification. Species labeled as such are vital for scientists who aim to protect species of concern, as they can utilize data gathered from the indicator species. Furthermore, there are also no regulations on what sizes or quantities are allowed to be kept.
