= Adulthood (disambiguation) =

Adulthood is the period of being an adult.

Adulthood may also refer to:

- Legal adulthood, the age legally defined as adult
- Adulthood (album) 2011 album
- Adulthood (2008 film), British teen crime drama by Noel Clarke
- Adulthood (2025 film), American comedy noir film directed by Alex Winter

== See also ==
- Adult (disambiguation)
- Early adulthood (disambiguation)
- Manhood (disambiguation)
- Womanhood (disambiguation)
