= Another Chance (Tammy Wynette song) =

Single by Tammy Wynette

from the album Soft Touch
- B-side: "What's It Like to Be a Woman"
- Released: February 1982
- Recorded: January 1982
- Studio: Woodland Studios; Nashville, Tennessee, U.S.
- Genre: Country
- Length: 2:40
- Label: Epic
- Songwriters: Robert Dawdry; Dennis Knutson; Jerry Taylor
- Producer: George Richey

Tammy Wynette singles chronology
"Crying in the Rain" (1981)	"Another Chance" (1982)	"You Still Get to Me in My Dreams" (1982)

"Another Chance" is a song written by Robert Dawdry, Dennis Knutson and Jerry Taylor, and recorded by American country music artist Tammy Wynette. It was released in March 1982 as the first single from the album Soft Touch

"Another Chance" was recorded at Woodland Studios, located in Nashville, Tennessee. The recording session was produced by George Richey, Wynette's husband and musical collaborator. It was the first recording session of Wynette's to be produced by Richey. Previous recording sessions were mostly produced by Billy Sherrill, Wynette's long-time producer at Epic Records. The session included several more tracks that would appear on Wynette's 1982 studio album. Notable session musicians included Charlie McCoy playing the harmonica and Pete Wade playing guitar.

The song reached number 8 on the Billboard Hot Country Singles chart. "Another Chance" became Wynette's first solo single to reach the country songs "top 10" list since 1979's "No One Else in the World". It was released on her 1982 studio album Soft Touch.

== Track listing ==
7" vinyl single

- "Another Chance" – 2:40
- "What's It Like to Be a Woman" – 3:29

== Charts ==
Chart (1982)	Peak position
US Hot Country Singles (Billboard)	8
Canada Country Singles (RPM)	3
