= Expired =

Expired may refer to:

- Expired (2007 film), an American comedy-drama film
- Expired (2022 film), an Australian science fiction film

== See also ==
- Expiration (disambiguation)
- Expired air
