= Soft Touch (Tammy Wynette album) =

Studio album by Tammy Wynette
- Released: May 3, 1982
- Recorded: Jan. 1982
- Studio: Woodland (Nashville, Tennessee)
- Genre: Country
- Length: 32:19
- Label: Epic
- Producer: George Richey

Tammy Wynette chronology
You Brought Me Back (1981)	Soft Touch (1982)	Good Love & Heartbreak (1982)

Singles from Soft Touch
- 1. "Another Chance" Released: Mar. 1982; 2. "You Still Get to Me in My Dreams" Released: Jul. 1982

Professional ratings
Review scores
Source	Rating
AllMusic	2.5/5 stars

Soft Touch is the twenty-third studio album by American country music singer-songwriter Tammy Wynette. It was released on May 3, 1982, by Epic Records.

== Chart performance ==
The album peaked at No. 31 on the Billboard Country Albums chart. The album's first single, "Another Chance", peaked at No. 8 on the Billboard Country Singles chart, and the second single, "You Still Get to Me in My Dreams", peaked at No. 16.

== Track listing ==
Side one
No.	Title	Writer(s)	Length
1.	"Old Reliable"	Wayland Holyfield	3:03
2.	"She Can't Take My Love Off the Bed"	Debbie Hupp, Bob Morrison	2:56
3.	"Being Gone"	Bill Taylor, Bobby Keel, Toni Dae, Judy Tigert	3:18
4.	"What's It Like to Be a Woman" (duet with daughter Tina Byrd Jones)	Chris Waters, Michael Garvin	3:30
5.	"I'll Still Be Loving You This Much"	Bobby Borchers, Curly Putman	2:58

Side two
No.	Title	Writer(s)	Length
1.	"Another Chance"	Robert Dawdry, Jerry Taylor, Dennis Knutson	2:42
2.	"If I Didn't Have a Heart"	Jerry Taylor, Knutson, Linda Juma	3:53
3.	"You Still Get to Me in My Dreams"	A.L. "Doodle" Owens, Bill Shore	3:11
4.	"Sometimes I'm a Little Girl"	Larry Henley, C. Michael Spriggs, Kathy Burdick	3:24
5.	"Dancing Your Memory Away"	Eddie Burton, Thomas Grant	3:24

== Personnel ==
Adapted from the album liner notes.

- George Binkley - strings
- David Briggs - keyboard
- Jerry Carrigan - drums, percussion
- James Capps - acoustic guitar
- Marvin Chantry - strings
- Roy Christensen - strings
- Virginia Christensen - strings
- Jo Coulter - make-up
- Connie Ellisor - strings
- Phil Forrest - background vocals
- Lloyd Green - steel guitar
- Carl Gorodetzky - strings
- Sherri Huffman - background vocals
- Shane Keister - keyboard
- Millie Kirkham - background vocals
- Slick Lawson - photography
- Mike Leech - bass
- Rebecca Lynch - strings
- Connie McCollister - background vocals
- Ric McCollister - engineer
- Charlie McCoy - harmonica, vibes
- Dennis Molchan - strings
- Weldon Myrick - steel guitar
- George Richey - producer
- Billy Sanford - lead guitar
- Walter Schwede - strings
- Lisa Silver - background vocals
- Jan Smith - hairdresser, wardrobe
- Henry Strzelecki - bass
- Wendellyn Suits - background vocals
- Robert Thompson - acoustic guitar
- Diane Tidwell - background vocals
- Gary Vanosdale - strings
- Pete Wade - lead guitar
- D. Bergen White - background vocals, string arrangements
- Tommy Williams - fiddle
- Stephanie Woolf - strings
- Robert T. Wray, II - bass
- Tammy Wynette - lead vocals

== Charts ==
=== Album ===
Year	Chart	Peak position
1982	Country Albums (Billboard)	31

=== Singles ===
Year	Single	Chart	Peak position
1982	"Another Chance"	Country Singles (Billboard)	8
1982	"You Still Get to Me in My Dreams"	Country Singles (Billboard)	16
