= A Good Night's Love =

Single by Tammy Wynette

from the album Good Love & Heartbreak
- B-side: "I'm Going on with Everything Gone"
- Released: November 1982
- Recorded: January 1982
- Studio: Woodland (Nashville, Tennessee)
- Genre: Country
- Length: 2:48
- Label: Epic
- Songwriters: Tim DuBois; Chester Lester
- Producer: George Richey

Tammy Wynette singles chronology
"You Still Get to Me in My Dreams" (1982)	"A Good Night's Love" (1982)	"I Just Heard a Heart Break (And I'm So Afraid It's Mine)" (1983)

"A Good Night's Love" is a song written by Tim DuBois and Chester Lester, and recorded by American country music artist Tammy Wynette. It was released in November 1982 as the first single from the album Good Love & Heartbreak.

== Background and reception ==
"A Good Night's Love" was recorded in September 1982 at Woodland Studios, located in Nashville, Tennessee. Other songs recorded during the same session would later appear on Wynette's 1983 studio album. The song was produced by George Richey, Wynette's collaborator and husband. It was the second of Wynette's session to be produced by Richey. Other notable musicians that appeared on the recording were Pete Wade playing guitar and country artist Judy Rodman performing background vocals.

The song reached number 19 on the Billboard Hot Country Singles chart. It was released on her 1983 studio album Good Love & Heartbreak.

== Track listings ==
7" vinyl single

- "A Good Night's Love" – 2:48
- "I'm Going on with Everything Gone" – 2:39

== Charts ==
Chart (1982–83)	Peak position
US Hot Country Singles (Billboard)	19
Canada Country Singles (RPM)	39
