= One of a Kind (Tammy Wynette song) =

Single by Tammy Wynette

from the album One of a Kind
- B-side: "Loving You, I Do"
- Released: August 1977
- Recorded: December 1976
- Studio: Columbia (Nashville, Tennessee)
- Genre: Country
- Length: 2:51
- Label: Epic
- Songwriters: Stephen Allen Davis; Billy Sherrill
- Producer: Billy Sherrill

Tammy Wynette singles chronology
| "(Let's Get Together) One Last Time" (1977) | "One of a Kind" (1977) | "I'd Like to See Jesus (On the Midnight Special)" (1978) |

"One of a Kind" is a song written by Billy Sherrill and Stephen Allen Davis, and recorded by American country music artist Tammy Wynette. It was released August 1977 as the first single from the album One of a Kind.

== Background and reception ==
"One of a Kind" was first recorded in December 1976 at the Columbia Recording Studio in Nashville, Tennessee. Additional tracks were recorded during this session, which would ultimately become part of Wynette's studio album One of a Kind. The session was produced by Billy Sherrill and the song was issued as a single in August 1977.

The song reached number 6 on the Billboard Hot Country Singles chart. It released on her studio album One of a Kind.

== Track listings ==
7" vinyl single

- "One of a Kind" – 2:54
- "Loving You, I Do" – 2:50

== Charts ==
| Chart (1977) | Peak position |
|---|---|
| US Hot Country Singles (Billboard) | 6 |
| CAN Country Singles (RPM) | 17 |
