= I'd Like to See Jesus (On the Midnight Special) =

Single by Tammy Wynette

from the album Womanhood
- B-side: "Love Doesn't Always Come (On The Night It's Needed)"
- Released: March 1978
- Studio: Columbia Studio
- Genre: Country
- Length: 2:51
- Label: Epic
- Songwriters: Robert Seay; Dorval Lynn Smith
- Producer: Billy Sherrill

Tammy Wynette singles chronology
"One of a Kind" (1977)	"I'd Like to See Jesus (On the Midnight Special)" (1978)	"Womanhood" (1978)

"I'd Like to See Jesus (On the Midnight Special)" is a song written by Robert Seay and Dorval Lynn Smith that was originally recorded by American country artist Tammy Wynette. It was released as a single in 1978, reaching top 40 chart positions in both the United States and Canada. It was the first single off Wynette's 1978 album, Womanhood.

== Background, release and chart performance ==
Tammy Wynette was considered among country music's most popular female artists during the 1960s and 1970s. She had 20 number one Billboard country singles. Until the end of 1970s, she had continuous commercial success. One of the singles Wynette recorded in the late 1970s was "I'd Like to See Jesus (On the Midnight Special)". Written by Robert Seay and Dorval Lynn Smith, the song's story line was based on the late musical series, The Midnight Special.

The song was recorded at Columbia Studio B in Nashville, Tennessee in a session produced by Billy Sherrill. It was released as a single by Epic Records in March 1978 backed by Wynette's self-penned track, "Love Doesn't Always Come (On The Night It's Needed)". "I'd Like to See Jesus (On the Midnight Special)" peaked at number 26 on the American Billboard Hot Country Songs chart in 1978. It was Wynette's first solo charting single to miss the Billboard country top 20. In Canada, it reached number 27 on their RPM Country Songs chart. It was released on Wynette's 1978 studio album, Womanhood.

== Track listing ==
7" vinyl single

- "I'd Like to See Jesus (On the Midnight Special)" – 2:51
- "Love Doesn't Always Come (On The Night It's Needed)" – 2:39

== Charts ==
Chart (1980)	Peak position
US Hot Country Singles (Billboard)	26
Canada Country Singles (RPM)	27
