= Only Lonely Sometimes =

Studio album by Tammy Wynette
- Released: June 9, 1980
- Recorded: Jan. 1980
- Studio: Columbia, Nashville; FAME, Muscle Shoals
- Genre: Country
- Length: 32:38
- Label: Epic
- Producer: Billy Sherrill

Tammy Wynette chronology
Just Tammy (1979)	Only Lonely Sometimes (1980)	Together Again (1980)

Singles from Only Lonely Sometimes
- 1. "He Was There (When I Needed You)" Released: Mar. 1980; 2. "Starting Over" Released: Aug. 1980

Professional ratings
Review scores
Source	Rating
AllMusic	2.5/5 stars

Only Lonely Sometimes is the twenty-first studio album by American country music singer-songwriter Tammy Wynette. It was released on June 9, 1980, by Epic Records.

== Chart performance ==
The album peaked at No. 37 on the Billboard Country Albums chart. The album's first single, "He Was There (When I Needed You)", peaked at No. 17 on the Billboard Country Singles chart, and the album's second single, "Starting Over", also peaked at No. 17.

== Track listing ==
Side one
No.	Title	Writer(s)	Length
1.	"He Was There (When I Needed You)"	Sue Richards	3:15
2.	"I'll Be Thinking of You"	Richards	3:58
3.	"You Never Knew"	Jerry Taylor, Robert J. Jones	2:59
4.	"Come with Me"	Chuck Howard	2:56
5.	"You Needed Me"	Randy Goodrum	3:22

Side two
No.	Title	Writer(s)	Length
1.	"Starting Over"	Bob McDill	3:07
2.	"Out of the Spotlight"	Taylor, Jones	3:22
3.	"Only the Names Have Been Changed"	Tammy Wynette, Jan Howard	3:11
4.	"When You Love Me"	Taylor, Paul Richey	3:16
5.	"Ozark Mountain Lullaby"	Jones	3:12

== Personnel ==
Adapted from the album liner notes.

- Phil Baugh - lead guitar
- Ken Bell - rhythm guitar
- Lou Bradley - engineer
- Tom Brannon - background vocals
- Jimmy Capps - rhythm guitar
- Jerry Carrigan - drums
- Boomer Castleman - rhythm guitar
- C.C. Couch - background vocals
- Mike Daniel - engineer
- Chalmers Davis - keyboard
- Diane Davidson - background vocals
- Pete Drake - steel guitar
- Jimmy English - lead guitar
- Ralph Ezell - bass
- Johnny Gimble - fiddle
- Owen Hale - drums
- Kenny Malone - drums
- Bill McElhiney - string arrangements
- Steve Nathan - keyboard
- Nightstreets - background vocals
- June Page - background vocals
- Ron Reynolds - engineer
- George Richey - keyboard
- Hargus "Pig" Robbins - keyboard
- Norman Seeff - photography
- The Shelly Kurland Strings - strings
- Billy Sherrill - producer
- Henry Strzelecki - bass
- Virginia Team - art direction
- Pete Wade - rhythm guitar
- Tammy Wynette - lead vocals
- Reggie Young - lead guitar

== Charts ==
=== Album ===
Year	Chart	Peak position
1980	US Country Albums (Billboard)	37

=== Singles ===
Year	Single	Chart	Peak position
1980	"He Was There (When I Needed You)"	Country Singles (Billboard)	17
1980	"Starting Over"	Country Singles (Billboard)	17
