= Manhood (disambiguation) =

Manhood is the state of being a man.

Manhood may also refer to:

- Masculinity, a set of attributes, behaviors, and roles typically associated with boys and men
- Manhood (2003 film), an American comedy-drama film
- Manhood (2026 film), an American documentary film
- Manhood (Law & Order), a 1993 episode of Law & Order
- Manhood (album), a 2007 album by stic.man
- Manhood, a 2012 album by Muscles
- Manhood Peninsula in West Sussex, England
- Manhood Community College
- Manhood (play), a play acted in by William J. Le Moyne in 1882
- Manhood, an 1842 painting in The Voyage of Life series by Thomas Cole
- Manhood: The Masculine Virtues America Needs, a 2023 book by US Senator Josh Hawley

== People with the surname ==
- Harold Alfred Manhood (1904–1991), British author

== See also ==
- Adulthood (disambiguation)
- Man (disambiguation)
- Womanhood (disambiguation)
