= Womanhood (album) =

Studio album by Tammy Wynette
- Released: July 1978
- Recorded: April 1978
- Studio: Columbia (Nashville, Tennessee)
- Genre: Country
- Length: 28:23
- Label: Epic
- Producer: Billy Sherrill

Tammy Wynette chronology
One of a Kind (1977)	Womanhood (1978)	Just Tammy (1979)

Singles from Womanhood
- 1. "I'd Like to See Jesus (On the Midnight Special)" Released: April 10, 1978; 2. "Womanhood" Released: July 3, 1978

Professional ratings
Review scores
Source	Rating
AllMusic	2.5/5 stars
Christgau's Record Guide	B
The Rolling Stone Album Guide	3.5/5 stars

Womanhood is a studio album by American country music singer-songwriter Tammy Wynette, released in July 1978 by Epic Records.

== Commercial performance ==
The album peaked at No. 14 on the Billboard Country Albums chart. The album's first single, "I'd Like to See Jesus (On the Midnight Special)", peaked at No. 26 on the Billboard Country Singles chart, while the second single, "Womanhood", peaked at No. 3.

== Track listing ==
Side one
No.	Title	Writer(s)	Length
1.	"Womanhood"	Bobby Braddock	2:51
2.	"That's What Friends Are For"	Ed Penney, Rob Parsons	2:45
3.	"You Oughta Hear the Song"	Roger Bowling, Jody Emerson	2:55
4.	"What's a Couple More"	Dennis William Wilson	2:39
5.	"The One Song I Never Could Write"	Wayland Holyfield	3:20

Side two
No.	Title	Writer(s)	Length
1.	"I'd Like to See Jesus (On the Midnight Special)"	Robert Seay, Dorval Lynn Smith	2:51
2.	"Mem'ries"	Linda Hargrove, Susan Hargrove	2:50
3.	"Standing Tall"	Larry Butler, Ben Peters	3:03
4.	"Love Doesn't Always Come (On the Night It's Needed)"	Tammy Wynette, Joan Dew	2:27
5.	"50 Words or Less"	Danny Hogan, Frank Newberry	2:42

== Personnel ==
Adapted from the album liner notes.

- Lou Bradley - engineer
- Bill Justis - string arrangement
- The Nashville Edition - backing vocals
- Norman Seef - photography
- Billy Sherrill - producer
- Virginia Team - cover design
- Tammy Wynette - lead vocals

== Chart positions ==
=== Album ===
Year	Chart	Peak position
1978	Country Albums (Billboard)	14

=== Singles ===
Year	Single	Chart	Peak position
1978	"I'm Like to See Jesus (On the Midnight Special)"	Country Singles (Billboard)	26
1978	"Womanhood"	Country Singles (Billboard)	3
