= Good Love & Heartbreak =

Studio album by Tammy Wynette
- Released: November 1, 1982
- Recorded: Sep. 1982
- Studio: Woodland (Nashville, Tennessee)
- Genre: Country
- Length: 31:33
- Label: Epic
- Producer: George Richey

Tammy Wynette chronology
| Soft Touch (1982) | Good Love & Heartbreak (1982) | Even the Strong Get Lonely (1983) |

Singles from Good Love & Heartbreak
- 1. "A Good Night's Love" Released: Nov. 1982; 2. "I Just Heard a Heart Break (And I'm So Afraid It's Mine)" Released: May 1983

Professional ratings
Review scores
| Source | Rating |
|---|---|
| AllMusic | 2/5 stars |

Good Love & Heartbreak is the twenty-fourth studio album by American country music singer-songwriter Tammy Wynette. It was released on November 1, 1982, by Epic Records.

== Chart performance ==
The album peaked at No. 62 on the Billboard Country Albums chart. The album's first single, "A Good Night's Love", peaked at No. 19 on the Billboard Country Singles chart, and the second single, "I Just Heard a Heart Break (And I'm So Afraid It's Mine)", peaked at No. 46.

== Track listing ==
Side one
| No. | Title | Writer(s) | Length |
|---|---|---|---|
| 1. | "A Good Night's Love" | Chester Lester, Tim DuBois | 2:48 |
| 2. | "I Still Dream About You" | Agnes Wilburn | 3:23 |
| 3. | "Back to the Wall" | Larry Bastian | 3:34 |
| 4. | "Half the Heart" | Billy Henderson, Bud McGuire | 2:47 |
| 5. | "It's the Goodbye That Blows Me Away" | A.L. "Doodle" Owens, George Richey | 3:13 |

Side two
| No. | Title | Writer(s) | Length |
|---|---|---|---|
| 1. | "I Just Heard a Heart Break (And I'm So Afraid It's Mine)" | Richey, Jerry Taylor, Tammy Wynette | 3:04 |
| 2. | "Somebody Hold Me Until He Passes By" | Ava Aldridge, Roy Aldridge, Sue Richards | 2:59 |
| 3. | "Time" | Bastian | 2:32 |
| 4. | "I'm Going on with Everything Gone" | Agnes Wilson | 2:33 |
| 5. | "I've Come Back (To Say I Love You One More Time)" | Chuck Howard | 4:40 |

== Personnel ==
Adapted from the album liner notes.

- David Briggs - keyboards
- Jimmy Capps - acoustic guitar
- Jerry Carrigan - drums, percussion
- Mike Douchette - harmonica
- Andy Engel - artwork, color tinting
- Sonny Garrish - steel guitar
- Mike Leech - bass
- Rick McCollister - engineer
- Farrell Morris - percussion
- Weldon Myrick - steel guitar
- George Richey - producer
- Judy Rodman - background vocals
- Norman Seeff - photography
- Henry Strzelecki - bass
- Wendellyn Suits - background vocals
- Pete Wade - lead guitar
- D. Bergen White - background vocals, string arrangements
- Dennis Wilson - background vocals
- Tammy Wynette - lead vocals
- Chip Young - acoustic guitar

== Charts ==
=== Album ===
| Year | Chart | Peak position |
|---|---|---|
| 1982 | Country Albums (Billboard) | 62 |

=== Singles ===
| Year | Single | Chart | Peak position |
|---|---|---|---|
| 1982 | "A Good Night's Love" | Country Singles (Billboard) | 19 |
| 1983 | "I Just Heard a Heart Break (And I'm So Afraid It's Mine)" | Country Singles (Billboard) | 46 |
