= Just Tammy =

Studio album by Tammy Wynette
- Released: June 11, 1979
- Recorded: December 1978
- Studios: Columbia (Nashville, Tennessee)
- Genre: Country
- Length: 28:25
- Label: Epic
- Producer: Billy Sherrill

Tammy Wynette chronology
Womanhood (1978)	Just Tammy (1979)	Only Lonely Sometimes (1980)

Singles from Just Tammy
- 1. "They Call It Making Love" Released: January 29, 1979; 2. "No One Else in the World" Released: May 28, 1979

Professional ratings
Review scores
Source	Rating
AllMusic	3/5 stars
Christgau's Record Guide	B−
The Rolling Stone Album Guide	3/5 stars

Just Tammy is a studio album by American country music singer-songwriter Tammy Wynette. It was released on June 11, 1979, by Epic Records.

== Commercial performance ==
The album peaked at No. 25 on the Billboard Country Albums chart. The album's first single, "They Call It Making Love", peaked at No. 6 on the Billboard Country Singles chart, and the album's second single, "No One Else in the World", peaked at No. 7.

== Track listing ==
Side one
No.	Title	Writer(s)	Length
1.	"They Call It Making Love"	Bobby Braddock	2:19
2.	"We'll Talk About It Later"	Tammy Wynette	2:23
3.	"Somewhere"	John Greenebaum, Thomas Gmeiner	3:02
4.	"Mama, Your Little Girl Fell"	Earl Montgomery	3:34
5.	"I'm Not Ready Yet"	Tom T. Hall	3:31

Side two
No.	Title	Writer(s)	Length
1.	"No One Else in the World"	Billy Sherrill, Stephen Allen Davis	3:12
2.	"You Don't Know the Half of It"	Montgomery	2:29
3.	"I L-O-V-E Y-O-U"	Braddock	2:40
4.	"You Never Cross My Mind"	Curly Putman, Rafe Van Hoy, Deborah Allen	2:32
5.	"Let Me Be Me"	Wynette	2:43

== Personnel ==
Adapted from the album liner notes.

- Lou Bradley – engineer
- Bill McElhiney – string arrangement
- The Nashville Edition – backing vocals
- Norman Seeff – photography
- Billy Sherrill – producer
- Sherri West – hair and make-up
- Baron Wolman – photography
- Tammy Wynette – lead vocals

== Chart positions ==
=== Album ===
Year	Chart	Peak position
1979	Country Albums (Billboard)	25

=== Singles ===
Year	Single	Chart	Peak position
1979	"They Call It Making Love"	Country Singles (Billboard)	6
1979	"No One Else in the World"	Country Singles (Billboard)	7
