= (Let's Get Together) One Last Time =

- Dutch release picture sleeve

Single by Tammy Wynette

from the album Let's Get Together
- B-side: "Hardly a Day Goes By"
- Released: January 1977
- Recorded: December 1976
- Studio: Columbia Recording Studio; Nashville, Tennessee, U.S.
- Genre: Country
- Length: 2:51
- Label: Epic
- Songwriters: George Richey; Billy Sherrill
- Producer: Billy Sherrill

Tammy Wynette singles chronology
"You and Me" (1976)	"(Let's Get Together) One Last Time" (1977)	"One of a Kind" (1977)

"(Let's Get Together) One Last Time" is a song written by Billy Sherrill and George Richey, and recorded by American country music artist Tammy Wynette. It was released in January 1977 as the first single from the album Let's Get Together.

== Background and reception ==
"Let's Get Together" was first recorded in December 1976 at the Columbia Recording Studio in Nashville, Tennessee. Additional tracks were recorded during this session, which would ultimately become part of Wynette's studio album Let's Get Together. The session was produced by Billy Sherrill.

The song reached number 6 on the Billboard Hot Country Singles chart. It released on her studio album Let's Get Together.

== Track listings ==
7" vinyl single

- "(Let's Get Together) One Last Time" – 2:27
- "Hardly a Day Goes By" – 2:40

== Charts ==
Chart (1977)	Peak position
US Hot Country Singles (Billboard)	6
CAN Country Singles (RPM)	8
