= Expiration =

Expiration or expiration date may refer to:

== Expiration ==
Expiration may refer to:

- Death
- Exhalation of breath, breathing out
- Expiration (options), the legal termination of an option to take an action
- Shelf life, or the time after which a product expires
- Timeout (computing), or the expiration of Session (computer science) due to the passing of time
- Copyright expiration (disambiguation)
- Expiration (film), a 2004 independent feature film

== Expiration date ==
An expiration date is a predetermined date after which a particular product should no longer be used. The phrase may also refer to:

- Expiration Date (film), a 2006 American black comedy
- Expiration Date (2023 film), or Casi muerta, an Argentine-Uruguayan romantic comedy
- Expiration Date (Powers novel), a novel by Tim Powers
- Expiration Date (Swierczynski novel), written by Duane Swierczynski
- Expiration Date, a 2014 short film set in the Team Fortress 2 universe
- Expiry Date (miniseries), an Indian TV series

== See also ==
- Maturation (disambiguation)
- Notice period
