= You Still Get to Me in My Dreams =

Single by Tammy Wynette

from the album Soft Touch
- B-side: "If I Didn't Have a Heart"
- Released: July 1982
- Recorded: January 1982
- Studio: Woodland Studios; Nashville, Tennessee, U.S.
- Genre: Country
- Length: 3:09
- Label: Epic
- Songwriters: A.L. "Doodle" Owens; Bill Shore
- Producer: George Richey

Tammy Wynette singles chronology
"Another Chance" (1982)	"You Still Get to Me in My Dreams" (1982)	"A Good Night's Love" (1983)

"You Still Get to My Dreams" is a song written by A.L. "Doodle" Owens and Bill Shore, recorded by American country music artist Tammy Wynette. It was released in July 1982 as the second single from the album Soft Touch.

== Background and reception ==
"You Still Get to Me in My Dreams" was recorded at Woodland Studios, located in Nashville, Tennessee. The recording session was produced by George Richey, Wynette's husband and musical collaborator. It was the first recording session of Wynette's to be produced by Richey. Previous recording sessions were mostly produced by Billy Sherrill, Wynette's long-time producer at Epic Records. The session included several more tracks that would appear on Wynette's 1982 studio album. Notable session musicians included Charlie McCoy playing the harmonica and Pete Wade playing guitar.

The song reached number 16 on the Billboard Hot Country Singles chart. It was released on her 1982 studio album Soft Touch.

== Track listing ==
7" vinyl single

- "You Still Get to Me in My Dreams" – 3:09
- "If I Didn't Have a Heart" – 3:51

== Charts ==
Chart (1982)	Peak position
US Hot Country Singles (Billboard)	16
Canada Country Singles (RPM)	42
