= They Call It Making Love =

1978 song by Tammy Wynette

Single by Tammy Wynette

from the album Just Tammy
- B-side: "Let Me Be Me"
- Released: January 1979
- Recorded: December 1978
- Studio: Columbia Recording Studio; Nashville, Tennessee, U.S.
- Genre: Country
- Length: 2:19
- Label: Epic
- Songwriter: Bobby Braddock
- Producer: Billy Sherrill

Tammy Wynette singles chronology
"One of a Kind" (1978)	"They Call It Making Love" (1979)	"No One Else in the World" (1979)

"They Call It Making Love" is a song written by Bobby Braddock, and recorded by American country music artist Tammy Wynette. It released in January 1979 as the first single from the album Just Tammy.

== Background and reception ==
"They Call It Making Love" was first recorded in December 1978 at the Columbia Recording Studio in Nashville, Tennessee. Additional tracks were recorded during this session, which would ultimately become part of Wynette's studio album released with the single. The session was produced by Billy Sherrill and the song was issued as a single in January 1979.

The song reached number 6 on the Billboard Hot Country Singles chart. It released on her studio album Just Tammy.

== Track listings ==
7" vinyl single

- "They Call It Making Love" – 2:19
- "Let Me Be Me" – 2:43

== Charts ==
Chart (1979)	Peak position
US Hot Country Singles (Billboard)	6
CAN Country Singles (RPM)	6
