= Let's Get Together (Tammy Wynette album) =

Studio album by Tammy Wynette
- Released: May 30, 1977
- Recorded: December 1976
- Studio: Columbia (Nashville, Tennessee)
- Genre: Country
- Length: 26:53
- Label: Epic
- Producer: Billy Sherrill

Tammy Wynette chronology
You and Me (1976)	Let's Get Together (1977)	One of a Kind (1977)

Singles from Let's Get Together
- 1. "(Let's Get Together) One Last Time" Released: February 1977

Professional ratings
Review scores
Source	Rating
AllMusic	2.5/5 stars
The Rolling Stone Album Guide	2/5 stars

Let's Get Together is a studio album by American country music singer-songwriter Tammy Wynette. It was released on May 30, 1977, by Epic Records.

== Chart performance ==
The album peaked at No. 19 on the Billboard Country Albums chart. The album's only single, "Let's Get Together (One Last Time)", peaked at No. 6 on the Billboard Country Singles chart.

== Track listing ==
Side one
No.	Title	Writer(s)	Length
1.	"(Let's Get Together) One Last Time"	Billy Sherrill, George Richey	2:27
2.	"If We Never Love Again"	Paul Richey, Silvia Richey, Theresa Beaty, Albert E. Brumley	2:34
3.	"Loving You, I Do"	G. Richey, Tammy Wynette	2:50
4.	"It's Gonna Take a Long, Long Time"	Sue Richards	3:20
5.	"You Could Be Coming to Me"	Harold Reid, Don Reid	3:00

Side two
No.	Title	Writer(s)	Length
1.	"Your Sweet Lies (Turned Down My Sheets Again)"	James Vest, David Chamberlain	2:37
2.	"Cheatin' Is"	Rafe Van Hoy	2:32
3.	"I Can Love You"	Carmol Taylor, Agnes Wilson	2:15
4.	"No One Can Take His Place"	Taylor, Earl Bass	2:32
5.	"I Can Still Believe in You"	Steve Pippin, Mike Kosser	2:46

== Personnel ==
Adapted from the album liner notes.

- Bill Barnes - photography, album design
- Lou Bradley - engineer
- The Jordanaires - backing vocals
- Bill McElhiney - string arrangement
- The Nashville Edition - backing vocals
- Cheryl Pardue - album design
- Billy Sherrill - producer
- Bergen White - string arrangement
- Tammy Wynette - lead vocals

== Charts ==
=== Album ===
Year	Chart	Peak position
1977	US Country Albums (Billboard)	19

=== Singles ===
Year	Single	Chart	Peak position
1977	"Let's Get Together (One Last Time)"	Country Singles (Billboard)	6
