= Starting Over (Tammy Wynette song) =

Single by Tammy Wynette

from the album Only Lonely Sometimes
- B-side: "I'll Be Thinking of You"
- Released: July 1980
- Recorded: January 1980
- Studio: Columbia Recording Studio; Nashville, Tennessee, U.S.
- Genre: Country
- Length: 3:07
- Label: Epic
- Songwriter: Bob McDill
- Producer: Billy Sherrill

Tammy Wynette singles chronology
| "He Was There (When I Needed You)" (1980) | "Starting Over" (1980) | "Cowboys Don't Shoot Straight (Like They Used To)" (1981) |

"Starting Over" is a song written by Bob McDill, recorded by American country music artist Tammy Wynette. It was released in March 1980 as the second single from the album Only Lonely Sometimes.

== Background and reception ==
"Starting Over" was recorded in January 1980 at the Columbia Recording Studio in Nashville, Tennessee. The session featured tracks that would later appear on Wynette's 1980 album. The recording session was produced by Billy Sherrill and included renowned Nashville session musicians such as Johnny Gimble, Pete Drake and George Richey (Wynette's husband).

The song reached number 17 on the Billboard Hot Country Singles chart. It released on her 1980 studio album Only Lonely Sometimes.

== Track listings ==
7" vinyl single

- "Starting Over" – 3:07
- "I'll Be Thinking of You" – 3:58

== Charts ==
=== Weekly charts ===
| Chart (1980) | Peak position |
|---|---|
| US Hot Country Singles (Billboard) | 17 |
| CAN Country Singles (RPM) | 41 |
