= Melodrama (Lorde album) =

2017 studio album by Lorde

Studio album by Lorde
- Released: 16 June 2017
- Recorded: 2015–2017
- Studios: Electric Lady (New York); Rough Customer (Brooklyn Heights); Westlake (Los Angeles); Conway (Los Angeles); Jungle City (New York)
- Genres: Electropop; synth-pop; art pop
- Length: 40:59
- Labels: Universal; Lava; Republic
- Producers: Lorde; Jack Antonoff; Frank Dukes; Malay; Joel Little; Andrew Wyatt

Lorde chronology
The Hunger Games: Mockingjay – Part 1 (Original Motion Picture Soundtrack) (2014)	Melodrama (2017)	Solar Power (2021)

Singles from Melodrama
- 1. "Green Light" Released: 2 March 2017; 2. "Perfect Places" Released: 1 June 2017; 3. "Homemade Dynamite" Released: 16 September 2017

Melodrama is the second studio album by New Zealand singer-songwriter Lorde. It was released on 16 June 2017 by Lava and Republic Records and distributed through Universal. Following the breakthrough success of her debut album Pure Heroine (2013), Lorde retreated from the spotlight, and travelled between New Zealand and the United States. Initially inspired by her disillusionment with fame, she wrote Melodrama to capture heartbreak and solitude after her first breakup.

Lorde chose Jack Antonoff as the main collaborator because she felt the need to expand her artistry from the Joel Little-produced Pure Heroine. The final product is a synth-pop, art pop, and electropop record incorporating piano-based melodies, pulsing synthesisers and dense electronic beats. Critics viewed the album as a maximalist departure from the minimalist hip-hop-influenced production of its predecessor, and considered it a loose concept album chronicling the emotions ensued from a house party. The songs "Green Light", "Perfect Places", and "Homemade Dynamite" were released as singles. Lorde promoted the album through several music festivals she headlined, and the Melodrama World Tour in 2017 and 2018.

The album was Lorde's first number one in the United States and Canada, and also peaked atop the charts in Australia and New Zealand. It received gold or platinum certifications in the said countries and the United Kingdom. Melodrama received universal acclaim from music critics who complimented its sound and Lorde's vocals and direct songwriting; it was featured on various year-end and decade-end lists. It won a New Zealand Music Award for Album of the Year, and received a nomination for Album of the Year at the 60th Annual Grammy Awards in 2018. In 2020, Melodrama ranked at number 460 on Rolling Stone's revision of their list of the 500 greatest albums of all time.

== Background and recording ==
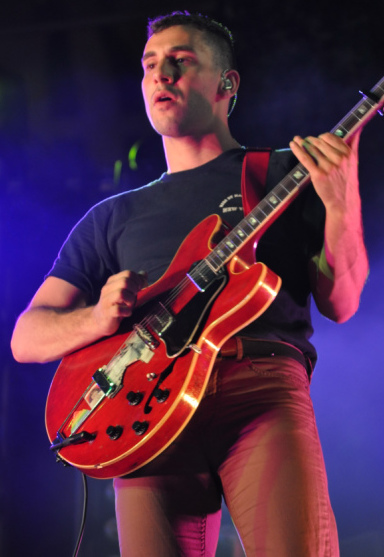
Jack Antonoff (pictured) co-wrote and co-produced the majority of the album with Lorde.

In December 2013, Lorde announced that she had begun writing material for an upcoming second studio album. The following year, she said it was in its early stages and that it was "totally different" from her debut album released earlier that year; she also said the shift in sound was due to the change in circumstances and settings of her life. Later in 2014, Lionsgate announced that Lorde would curate the soundtrack for the third installment of The Hunger Games franchise, which would be followed by the release of the film's lead single "Yellow Flicker Beat" to critical acclaim.

In an interview with Australia's Triple J radio network in February 2015, Joel Little, who produced Pure Heroine, said he was scheduled to join Lorde for a writing session in a recording studio the following month, although a definite plan was not yet established. More than a year later, he reported that even though he had written a few songs for the album, he would not serve as an executive producer, attributing this to Lorde "trying to do something different". Lorde was eventually featured on Disclosure's track "Magnets" which appears on the duo's 2015 album Caracal.

In January 2016, The New Zealand Herald reported that Lorde and James Lowe, her boyfriend, had ended their three-year relationship. The singer confirmed the break-up during interviews following the release of "Green Light" (2017), leading to her indulging in "heavy drinking" and noticing there was an "element of escapism and exploration" in doing so. Lorde eventually replied to a comment on her Instagram account in late August 2016 that she completed the writing process of Melodrama — still untitled at the time — and that she was in the production stages.

The singer went on to announce the album's title on 2 March 2017. She also began posting pictures of herself at Electric Lady Studios in New York City with Jack Antonoff on social media taken in and after December 2015. Further recording sessions took place at Antonoff's home studio in Brooklyn Heights, dubbed Rough Customer Studio, and Jungle City in New York City, as well as Westlake and Conway in Los Angeles. The duo recorded for 18 months. Melodrama was released through Universal, Lava and Republic Records on 16 June 2017.

== Writing and production ==
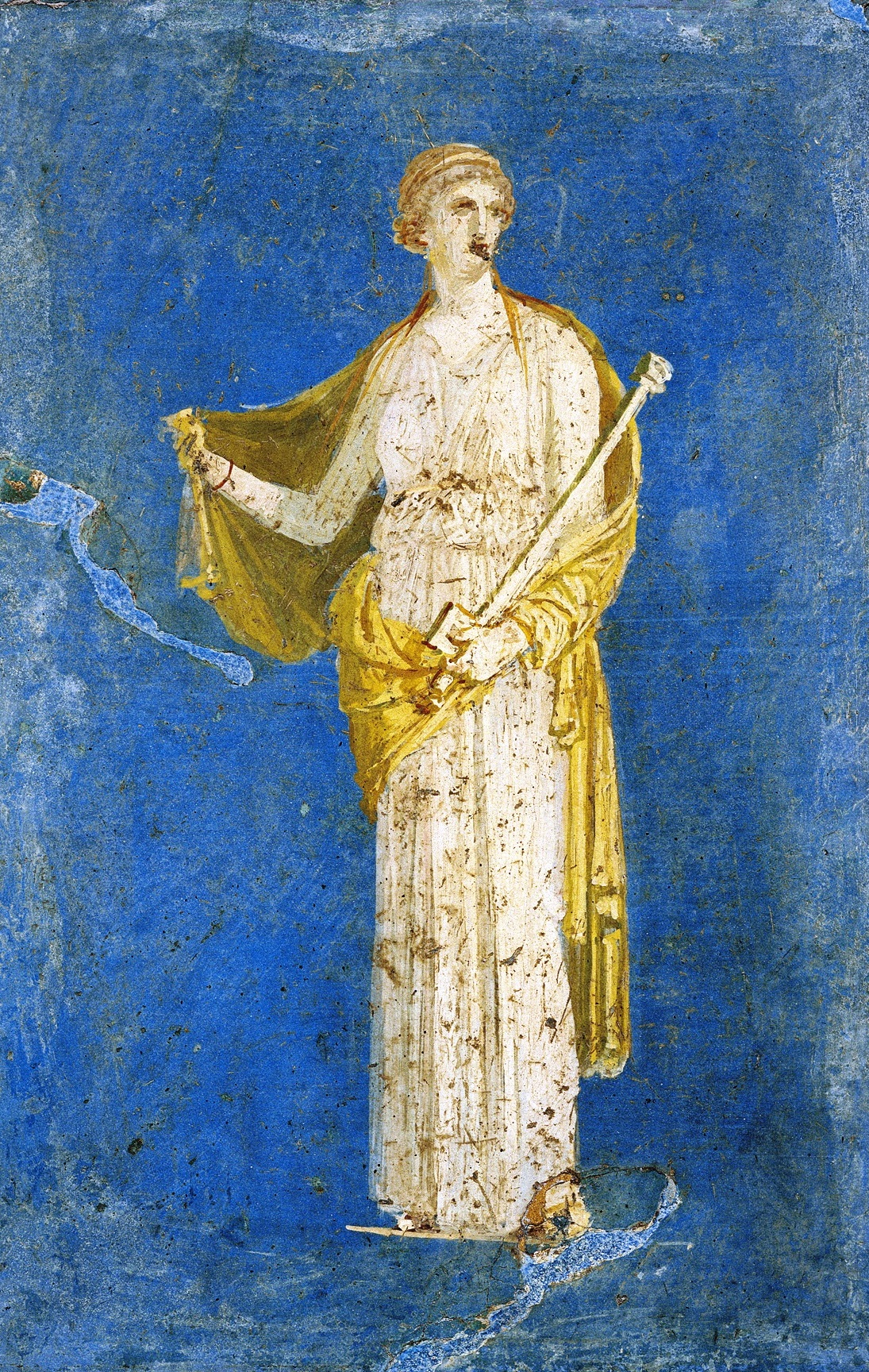
Lorde's tendency to draw parallels to Greek tragedies (Medea pictured) was a source of inspiration for the album's title.

Lorde said that during the early stages of writing content for Melodrama, she imagined writing the album from the perspective of aliens stepping outside a hermetically sealed environment for the first time, citing the 1950 science fiction short story "There Will Come Soft Rains" by Ray Bradbury as an inspiration. This was a reflection of her disengagement with her early fame. She scrapped the aliens idea and decided to write about her own struggles with the early stages of adulthood. Lorde also took notes from conversations with her friends and would fly multiple times between the United States and New Zealand to examine the world around her. The singer also travelled by helicopter to a rental house on Waiheke Island, where she could write without distractions, would continue working through "false starts, fruitless detours and stretches of inactivity" as she retreated from the public spotlight.

According to The New York Times, Melodrama is about a "grapple with emotions" in the aftermath of a break-up. Interviewed by the publication, Lorde says Melodrama is not simply a "breakup album" but is rather a "record about being alone", featuring both the favourable and unfavourable aspects associated with "heartbreak and solitude". She did, however, call "Green Light" a traditional break-up song. In an interview with Vanity Fair, Lorde said the title of the album is a "nod to the types of emotions you experience when you're 19 or 20." She cites her "love of theatre" and drawing parallels to Greek tragedies as inspiration for the album's title. According to Lorde, she had to deal with "very serious, vivid feelings" she needed to express after experiencing her first heartbreak and moving out of her parents' home; as a result, she spent time isolated in her own house.

While writing content for the album, Lorde took influence from a number of settings and tested new material by listening to demos through earphones at a diner near Columbus Circle, which she did for about four months to understand how the music would sound in everyday life. The diner usually played Top 40 radio, which she said would occasionally distract her from writing, although she sometimes removed her headphones to let the songs "wash over" her. She also took inspiration from strangers' conversations, often hearing certain phrases that she would think about for hours. These phrases also illustrated a "tableau" in her thoughts. In her home in New Zealand, Lorde had a wall of notes for her songs, which she used to "skim" the whole album; it allowed her to find connections to each track and "fill in their blanks". Each song was colour coded due to her sound-to-colour synesthesia; Lorde arranged the colours according to its theme and emotion. In a 2021 interview with Vogue, Lorde stated that the album was also influenced by her use of the drug MDMA.

== Artwork ==
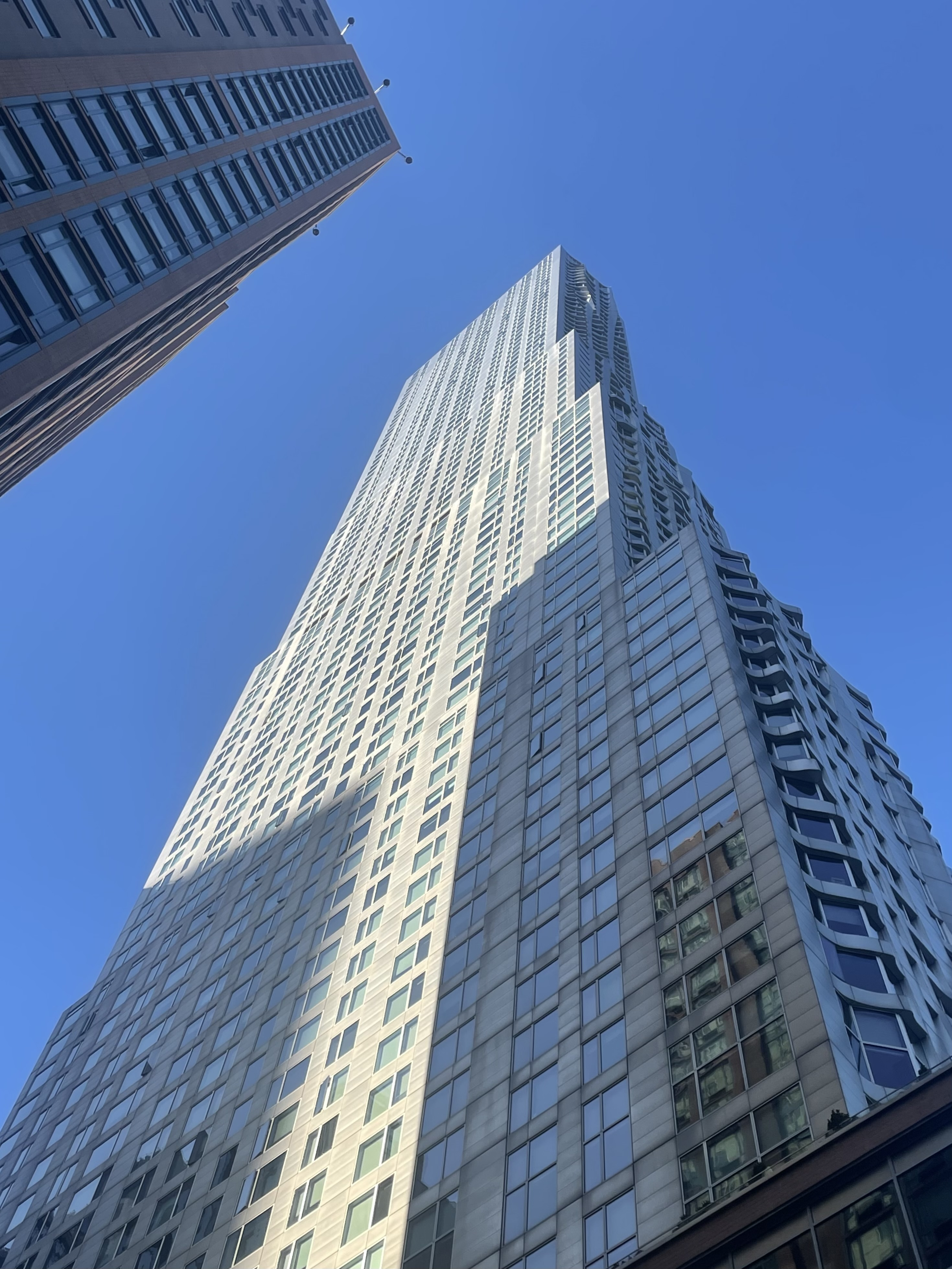
8 Spruce Street, where the album artwork's reference image was shot.

The cover artwork for Melodrama was painted by American abstract painter Sam McKinniss, with whom Lorde had communicated by email. The pair agreed to meet and started discussing a collaboration. Lorde later visited McKinniss' studio in Williamsburg, Brooklyn, where she took a liking to a full-figure portrait of the cover photograph of Prince's 1984 album Purple Rain and a painting of Lil' Kim. Lorde asked McKinniss to create a painting with a "kind of colorful teenage restlessness and excitement and energy and potential".

McKinniss and Lorde met in November 2016 at his friend's studio on the 42nd floor of Frank Gehry's 8 Spruce Street skyscraper, which consisted of coloured bulbs on a lighting rig and a space with several windows. For the album shoot, Lorde wore a vintage negligee and posed for two hours. According to McKinniss, the album art is the "converging of two like minds" and "simpatico spirits". The pair considered making the photography session "operatic" and pre-Raphaelite-inspired, but scrapped the idea because they were satisfied with Lorde's facial expressions on the resulting images. McKinniss made two paintings from his photographs; one featured a blue glow with a warm flush on Lorde's cheek and the other has different lighting, with "paler, sweeter" colours. The unused painting was later revealed in an interview with McKinniss for Dazed.

NME placed the cover on their list of the best album artworks of the 21st century so far. Paste ranked it at number 11 in their year-end list for album covers, and it also appeared on Billboard's unranked list. Tatiano Cirisano, writing for the latter publication, said McKinniss "perfectly communicates the intimacy and coming-of-age storyline" of the record with its "hazy twilight hues and bedside setting". Fuse also ranked the cover in their year-end list. Rolling Stone ranked the artwork at number 67 on their all-time list for album covers.

== Music and lyrics ==
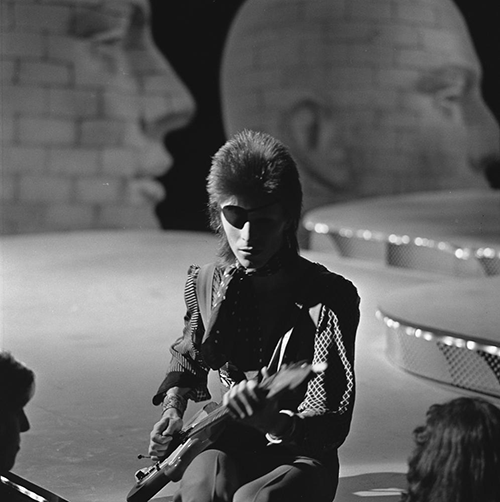
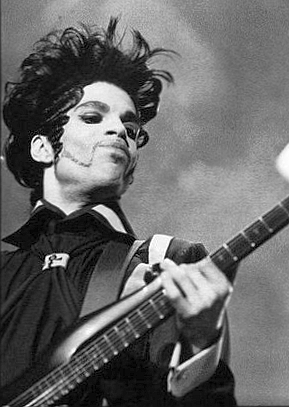
Among the album's inspirations were the deaths of David Bowie (left) and Prince (right).

Lorde's vocals on Melodrama have been noted for her emotional and multitrack delivery. She cites the emotional vocals of Kate Bush and Sinéad O'Connor, as well as Laurie Anderson's use of vocoder as inspiration for her vocal delivery on the album. The Daily Telegraph writer Neil McCormick noted that Lorde's vocals locate "different levels of intimacy in different vocal timbres, multi-tracking her voice so that it often sounds like songs are being delivered by competing versions of herself". According to NME, different personae of Lorde, ranging from the "strong, composed young woman" to the hidden "psycho", are showcased through her vocal performances on the album.

Melodrama is built around Antonoff's signature production, which incorporates drums, synths, layered vocals and straightforward hooks. Lorde and Antonoff met in early 2014 at a Grammy after-party and later had several "exploratory" writing sessions before Lorde hired him as the main co-writer on the album. Lorde worked on Melodrama in Antonoff's Rough Customer Studios in New York City and at her home in New Zealand. The song structures on the record are traditional in construction, with piano-based melodies in contrast with the hip-hop influences on Lorde's first album. The singer took a classicist approach, usually composing a melody and then trying different vocal falsettos; Lorde said that because of this, the whole album can be played in acoustic form. She also cited her desire to explore a "cathartic mode" for the album. Several publications noted its maximalist pop production, a departure from the singer's signature minimalist style. Melodrama has been described by critics as a pop, electropop, synth-pop, and art pop record.

The album's lyrics are about heartbreak and solitude. Though it has been denied by Lorde, music critics have described Melodrama as a loose concept album. Lorde has stated that the record has only a loose narrative; it follows the framework of a single house party, and the events and moods that ensue. According to the singer, the album's shift in narrative focuses on "I" in contrast with Pure Heroine's inclusion of "we" and "us". Lorde wanted to showcase contrast, going from "big and grand" to "really tiny and intimate", as well as desired to reference personal events, headlines and themes associated with the World Wide Web. She drew inspiration from Paul Simon's 1986 album Graceland, describing it as "enlightenment after love lost". She also mentioned the 2016 song "Somebody Else" by English band the 1975 as a track that provided influence on the tones, colours and emotions of the album. Lorde uses numerous metaphors on Melodrama, such as the teeth of great white sharks, continuing her incorporation of teeth in her lyrics.

== Songs ==
=== Tracks 1–5 ===
"The Louvre"
"The Louvre" is an acoustic guitar-driven electropop song with elements of indie rock and ambient music. Influenced by Frank Ocean's 2016 album Blonde, the song omits a chorus defying the traditional song structure.

The album's opening track, "Green Light", features titular metaphors; reviewers interpreted the "green light" as a street signal that gives the singer permission to move into the future. It was described by critics as an electropop, dance-pop, and post-disco song. Lorde was inspired to write the track after attending a Florence and the Machine concert with Antonoff; the writing process took her 18 months to complete. "Sober", which was formed using a bongo drum, was written after Lorde played a show at Coachella. The track's instrumentation also includes a tenor and baritone saxophone, a trumpet, as well as the sound of a tiger's roar, which was added when Antonoff looked through samples on his computer.

Lorde co-wrote "Homemade Dynamite" with Tove Lo. It is the only song on which Antonoff is not credited as a songwriter or producer. Lorde was inspired to write "The Louvre" after listening to Frank Ocean's 2016 album Blonde. She stated in a podcast interview with The Spinoff that she could have made a "big, easy single" but refrained from doing so because she felt it would not mean much to "simplify the journey" or "force a big chorus". She said that the production process was "exciting", stating, "I can use guitars and I can get a big gnarly Flume beat and throw it under water." According to Newsweek, the singer's cadence in some lines almost turns into rapping, which was compared with cross-genre music. "Liability" is the first piano ballad on the album; in a profile with The Spinoff, Lorde said was inspired by the track "Higher" from Rihanna's 2016 album Anti, which she listened to when she took a taxi home from a hike.

=== Tracks 6–11 ===
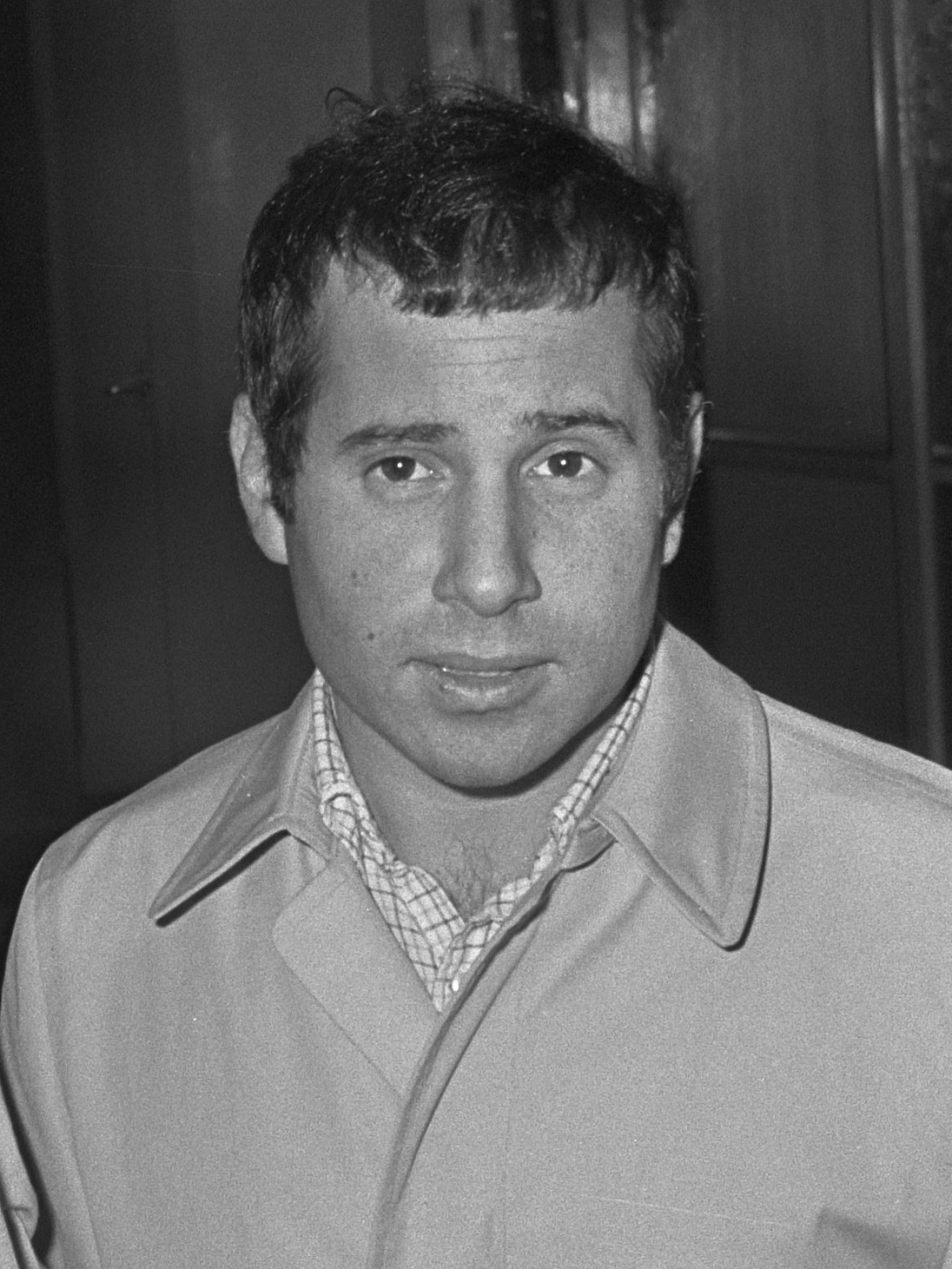
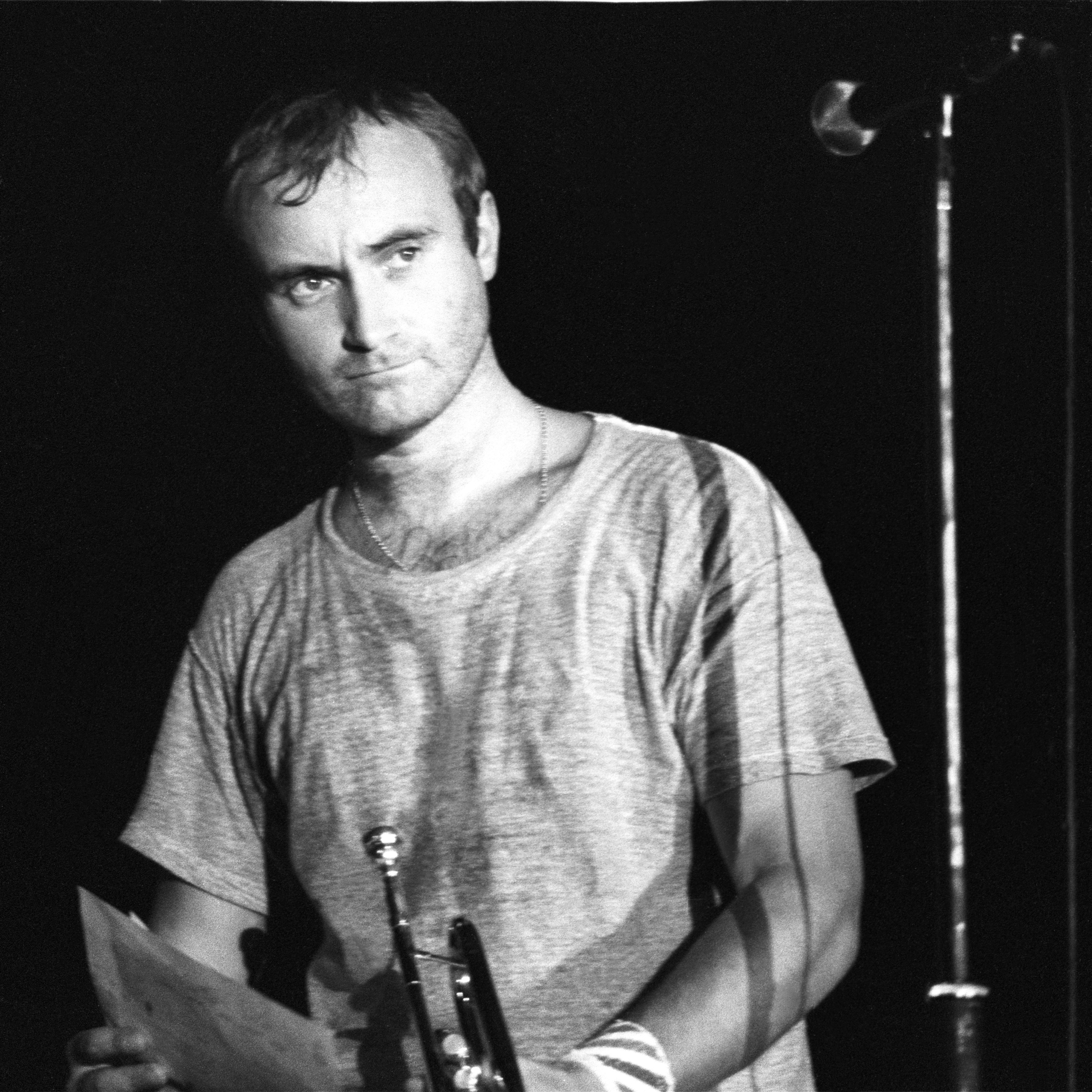
Lorde often listened to Paul Simon's (pictured left) 1986 album Graceland on taxis she took on her way home from parties. Critics also noted Phil Collins' (pictured right) signature instrumentation on the album.

The first part of the medley song "Hard Feelings/Loveless" uses a distorted synthesizer and elements of industrial, noise and electronica genres. Antonoff said one of his proudest moments while producing the album was the placing of a "synth at the end [of the song] that sounds like metal bending". The first two lines of "Loveless" were sampled from a documentary Lorde watched about Paul Simon's album Graceland. The drum solo used as the transition instrument linking "Hard Feelings" to "Loveless" was sampled from Phil Collins' 1981 song "In the Air Tonight". She often listened to the soft rock music of Leonard Cohen, Joni Mitchell, Fleetwood Mac and Paul Simon while riding the subways in New York City and taking cab rides home from parties in Auckland.

The following track, "Sober II (Melodrama)", a continuation of "Sober", details the emotions and sense of loneliness after a party is over. The song was originally titled "Sober (Interlude)" before its release. Lorde wrote down the main theme of "Writer in the Dark" after waking up in the middle of the night in a stranger's bed, feeling naughty and empowered while doing so. To her, it was a "cool, painful moment" on the record. The singer was inspired to write "Supercut" after driving through Ponsonby Road in Auckland in a taxi listening to Simon's album Graceland. Most of the song was constructed using drums, whereas "blanks" were later "filled" with piano sequences. It features an interpolation of a piano riff used in "Green Light". She considered turning "Liability (Reprise)" into an a cappella track before deciding to "be sensible" and adding a backing beat. "Perfect Places" was inspired after the deaths of David Bowie and Prince occurred, two musicians Lorde states were the most influential for the recording of Melodrama.

== Release and promotion ==
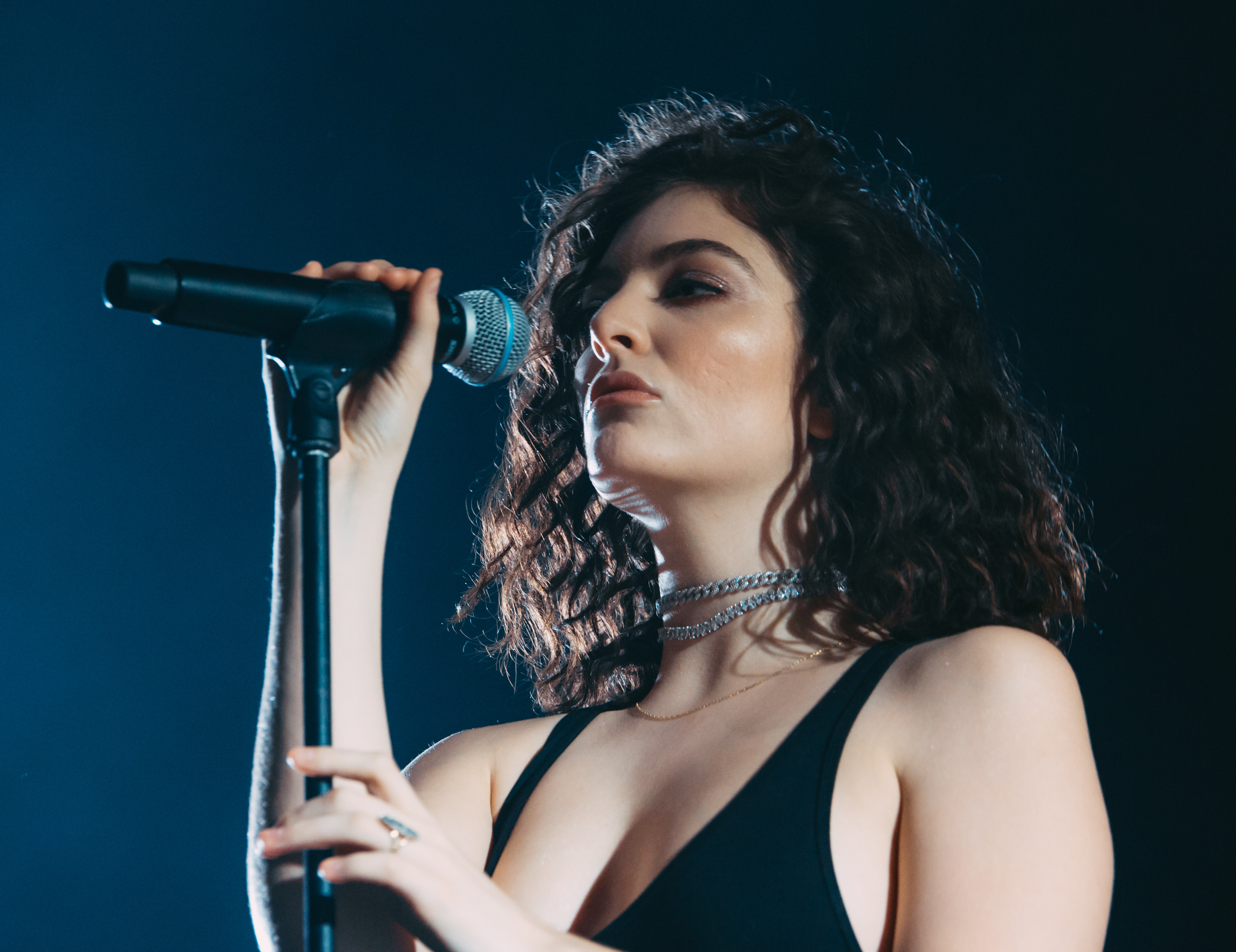
Lorde performing at the Osheaga Festival in 2017

Lorde first promoted the album by posting a link to a website called imwaitingforit.com to her Twitter account on 27 February 2017. The website featured a short clip of Lorde sitting in a car eating and drinking while a piano-backed track played in the background; this was followed with the dates "3.2.17 NYC" and "3.3.17 NZ" appearing onscreen. The video was titled "M" followed by seven asterisks and ending with "A", which would later be revealed as the album's name. According to Fact magazine, the clip was also broadcast on New Zealand's major television channels. The album was leaked online one day prior to release.

On 2 March 2017, Lorde released "Green Light" as the lead single from the album. The single was universally praised by critics, with many publications placing it in their year-end lists, and was recognised as NME's Single of the Year. It was commercially successful, earning platinum in the United States and a triple platinum certification in Australia. The following week, Lorde released "Liability" as Melodrama's first promotional single. She performed it alongside "Green Light" for the first time on 12 March 2017 episode of Saturday Night Live. This was her first performance in over two years, and gained positive reviews from critics.

Lorde released "Perfect Places" as the second single from Melodrama on 1 June 2017. The following week, "Sober" was announced as the album's second promotional single. At the 2017 MTV Video Music Awards, Lorde performed an interpretive dance to "Homemade Dynamite", which was met with mixed reviews from critics, some of whom called it "bizarre". Her decision not to sing came after she was diagnosed with influenza. Following her performance, Lorde released a remix of "Homemade Dynamite" that featured guest vocals by Khalid, Post Malone and SZA as the third single from the album on 16 September 2017. To further promote the album, Lorde embarked on a world tour with several opening acts; she announced the tour in June 2017. The tour began at the O2 Apollo Manchester in England on 26 September 2017 and ended on 19 October 2017 in Trondheim, Norway. The Oceania leg consisted of 13 dates. Lorde played an additional 30 shows in North America, which commenced in Milwaukee on 1 March 2018 and concluded in Nashville on 15 April 2018.

== Commercial performance ==
On the US Billboard 200, Melodrama debuted at number one with first-week sales of 109,000 album-equivalent units, of which 82,000 were pure sales, becoming Lorde's first number one in the United States. The album dropped to number 13 the following week. The Recording Industry Association of America (RIAA) awarded the album a gold certification, which denotes 500,000 units in consumption. Melodrama was also her first number-one album in Canada, where it received a platinum certification. It also debuted atop the charts in Australia and New Zealand, receiving double platinum and quadruple-platinum certifications in respective countries. It entered the UK Albums Chart at number five and was certified gold in the United Kingdom. The album also entered in European recorded music markets, reaching the top ten in Italy, Norway, Spain, Switzerland, Portugal, Sweden, Denmark and Netherlands, top twenty in Belgium, Poland and Germany, top thirty in France and top forty in Hungary.

== Critical reception ==
=== Critical response ===
Professional ratings
Aggregate scores
Source	Rating
AnyDecentMusic?	8.7/10
Metacritic	91/100
Review scores
Source	Rating
AllMusic	5/5 stars
The A.V. Club	A
The Daily Telegraph	5/5 stars
Entertainment Weekly	A
The Guardian	4/5 stars
The Independent	4/5 stars
NME	5/5 stars
Pitchfork	8.8/10
Rolling Stone	4/5 stars
Vice	B+

Upon release, Melodrama received widespread acclaim from music critics and fans. At Metacritic, which assigns a normalized rating out of 100 to reviews from mainstream critics, the album has an average score of 91, based on 32 critical reviews, indicating "universal acclaim". AnyDecentMusic? compiled 38 reviews and gave it an average score of 8.7 out of 10.

Alexis Petridis of The Guardian suggested that the record was a "cocky challenge being issued to her musical contemporaries." In a perfect five-star review, NME reviewer Dan Stubbs described Melodrama as a "rudely excellent album", praising its introspection, honesty and cleverness. In contrast, Carl Wilson of Slate conceded that the record was "kind of a detour" in comparison to 1970s artists such as Joni Mitchell and Leonard Cohen.

Nolan Feeney of Entertainment Weekly awarded the album an A and commended her songwriting skills, describing the album as a "puzzle that'll keep you busy long after the party is over." Pitchfork writer Stacey Anderson concluded that it was "a sleek and humid pop record full of grief and hedonism, crafted with the utmost care and wisdom." Sal Cinquemani of Slant echoed Anderson's judgment, describing it as "cathartic, dramatic, and everything else you could want an album titled Melodrama to be". Rolling Stone's Will Hermes lauded its production, labeling it a "tour de force."

The A.V. Club writer Meagan Fredette dubbed the record as "rich and cohesive", while Drowned in Sound's Joe Goggins concluded that Lorde "[operates] at the highest artistic level yet [puts] it across as easy-access modern mainstream pop." Writing for Spin, Anna Gaca quipped that Melodrama "embodies a strange, studious undoneness, the blacklight black-and-blue of a perfectionist trying to capture imperfect feelings". However, the Los Angeles Times critic Mikael Wood was less positive; he critiqued the album's storyline theme but acknowledged Lorde's potency when "owning her newfound authority".

=== Accolades ===
Melodrama placed second on Metacritic's list of the best-received albums of 2017, based on inclusions in mainstream publications' year-end lists. The album ranked at number four on The Village Voice's annual Pazz & Jop mass critics' poll for 2017. Metacritic ranked it the tenth album with most appearances on critics' top 10 best-of-the-decade lists, with 11 points. Regarding reception from music audiences, Rolling Stone readers voted Melodrama the second most popular album of 2017, while Pitchfork readers voted it the tenth greatest album of the 2010s, the highest position for a female artist's album on the list. In another Pitchfork readers poll featuring the 200 best albums released between 1996 and 2021, Melodrama was ranked at number 20 on the list.

The album won a New Zealand Music Award for Album of the Year, and received nominations at the ARIA Music Awards and the NME Awards. At the 60th Annual Grammy Awards in 2018, it was nominated for Album of the Year, which went to Bruno Mars' 24K Magic (2016). A day before the event, Variety reported that Lorde had declined to perform at the ceremony after the Recording Academy asked her to sing with other artists in a tribute to Tom Petty. Her decision came after other nominees, who were all male, were given the opportunity to perform songs from their nominated works.

Select critical rankings for Melodrama
Publication/critic	Time span	Rank	Published year	Ref.
Consequence of Sound	Year-end	1	2017	
Consequence of Sound	Decade-end	4	2019	
Consequence of Sound	Decade-end (Pop albums)	1	2019	
Consequence of Sound	2007–2022	75	2023	
Entertainment Weekly	Year-end	1	2017	
Entertainment Weekly	1990–2019	—	2020	
The Independent	Year-end	2	2017	
The Independent	Decade-end	8	2019	
NME	Year-end	1	2017	
NME	Decade-end	2	2019	
Paste	Decade-end (Pop albums)	12	2019	
Paste	All-time (Synth-pop albums)	25	2023	
Paste	All-time (Breakup albums)	27	2019	
Paste	All-time	252	2024	
Pitchfork	Year-end	5	2017	
Pitchfork	Decade-end	14	2019	
Robert Dimery	All-time	―	2018	
Rolling Stone	Year-end	2	2017	
Rolling Stone	Year-end (Pop albums)	1	2017	
Rolling Stone	Decade-end	7	2019	
Rolling Stone	21st century	25	2025	
Rolling Stone	All-time	460	2020	
Slant	Year-end	7	2017	
Slant	Decade-end	17	2019	
Stereogum	Year-end	1	2017	
Stereogum	Decade-end	17	2019	
Uncut	Year-end	18	2017	
Uncut	2010–2024	50	2024	
Uncut	All-time	360	2024	
Uproxx	Year-end	1	2017	
Uproxx	Decade-end	6	2019	

== Track listing ==
Melodrama – Standard version
No.	Title	Lyrics	Music	Producer(s)	Length
1.	"Green Light"	Ella Yelich-O'Connor	Lorde; Jack Antonoff; Joel Little	Lorde; Antonoff; Frank Dukes; Kuk Harrell^{[b]} (Note: Kuk Harrell is credited with vocal production on the first verse of "Green Light" only.)	3:54
2.	"Sober"	Yelich-O'Connor; Antonoff	Yelich-O'Connor; Antonoff	Lorde; Antonoff; Malay; Harrell^{[b]}	3:17
3.	"Homemade Dynamite"	Yelich-O'Connor; Tove Lo	Lorde; Lo; Jakob Jerlström; Ludvig Söderberg	Lorde; Dukes; Harrell^{[b]}	3:09
4.	"The Louvre"	Yelich-O'Connor; Antonoff	Yelich-O'Connor; Antonoff	Lorde; Antonoff; Flume^{[a]}; S1^{[a]}; Dukes^{[a]}	4:31
5.	"Liability"	Yelich-O'Connor; Antonoff	Yelich-O'Connor; Antonoff	Lorde; Antonoff	2:52
6.	"Hard Feelings/Loveless"	Yelich-O'Connor; Antonoff	Yelich-O'Connor; Antonoff	Lorde; Antonoff; Dukes; Malay	6:07
7.	"Sober II (Melodrama)"	Yelich-O'Connor; Antonoff	Yelich-O'Connor; Antonoff	Lorde; Antonoff; Dukes; S1^{[a]}; Harrell^{[c]}	2:58
8.	"Writer in the Dark"	Yelich-O'Connor	Yelich-O'Connor; Antonoff	Lorde; Antonoff	3:36
9.	"Supercut"	Yelich-O'Connor; Antonoff	Yelich-O'Connor; Antonoff	Lorde; Antonoff; Little; Dukes^{[a]}; Jean-Benoît Dunckel^{[a]}	4:37
10.	"Liability (Reprise)"	Yelich-O'Connor; Antonoff	Yelich-O'Connor; Antonoff	Lorde; Antonoff	2:16
11.	"Perfect Places"	Yelich-O'Connor; Antonoff	Yelich-O'Connor; Antonoff	Lorde; Antonoff; Andrew Wyatt; Dukes; T-Minus^{[a]}; Malay^{[a]}	3:41
Total length:					40:59

Japanese bonus track
No.	Title	Lyrics	Music	Producer(s)	Length
12.	"Green Light" (Chromeo remix)	Yelich-O'Connor	Lorde; Antonoff; Little	Chromeo	4:09
Total length:					45:08

Spotify bonus track^{[d]}
No.	Title	Lyrics	Music	Producer(s)	Length
12.	"Homemade Dynamite" (Remix) (featuring Khalid, Post Malone and SZA)	Ella Yelich-O'Connor; Khalid Robinson; Austin Post; Solána Rowe; Tove Lo	Lorde; Lo; Jakob Jerlström; Ludvig Söderberg	Dukes; Lorde; Harrell^{[b]}	3:34
Total length:					44:33

Notes

- ^{^[a]} signifies an additional producer
- ^{^[b]} signifies a vocal producer
- ^{^[c]} signifies an additional vocal producer
- ^{^[d]} added to the album after the single's release

Notes

- "Loveless" contains a sample of "In the Air Tonight", written and performed by Phil Collins and an audio recording from Paul Simon that appears on the 2012 documentary film, Under African Skies: Paul Simon's Graceland Journey.
- On vinyl releases, "Hard Feelings" (3:54) and "Loveless" (2:13) are separate tracks. The former is on side A and the latter is on side B, unlike the CD and digital versions where they are a single track.

== Personnel ==
Credits adapted from Jaxsta and the liner notes of Melodrama.

Production

- Lorde – executive production, production
- Jack Antonoff – executive production, production (tracks 1, 2, 4–11)
- Frank Dukes – production (tracks 1, 3, 6–7, 11), additional production (tracks 4, 9), programming (tracks 3, 6–7, 9, 11)
- Malay – production (track 2, 6), additional production (tracks 11), programming (tracks 2–4, 6, 9, 11)
- Joel Little – production (track 9)
- Andrew Wyatt – production (track 11)
- Flume – additional production (track 4)
- S1 – additional production (track 4, 7)
- Jean-Benoît Dunckel – additional production (track 9)
- Kuk Harrell – vocal production (tracks 1–3), additional vocal production (track 7)
- T-Minus – additional production (track 11)

Artwork

- Sam McKinniss – cover artwork
- Theo Wenner – photography
- World of McIntosh Townhouse – pool shots
- 12:01 (office of Hassan Rahim) – art direction, design

Technical

- Laura Sisk – engineering
- Barry McCready – engineering assistance (tracks 1, 2, 4–11)
- Greg Eliason – engineering assistance (tracks 1–4, 6–9, 11)
- Brendan Morawski – engineering assistance (tracks 1, 3–5, 7–11)
- Seth Paris – engineering assistance (tracks 2, 8, 10, 11)
- Eric Eylands – engineering assistance (tracks 3–7, 10, 11)
- Ben Sedano – engineering assistance (tracks 7, 9, 11)
- Şerban Ghenea – mixing (tracks 1–4, 6A, 9, 11)
- Tom Elmhirst – mixing (tracks 5, 7, 8, 10)
- Jack Antonoff – mixing (track 6B)
- John Hanes – engineering for mix (tracks 1–4, 6A, 9, 11)
- Joe Visciano – mixing assistance (track 5)
- Brandon Bost – mixing assistance (tracks 5, 7, 8, 10)
- Tom Coyne – mastering (tracks 1, 5)
- Randy Merrill – mastering (tracks 2–4, 6–11)

== Charts ==
=== Weekly charts ===
Chart (2017)	Peak position
Australian Albums (ARIA)	1
Austrian Albums (Ö3 Austria)	8
Belgian Albums (Ultratop Flanders)	12
Belgian Albums (Ultratop Wallonia)	12
Canadian Albums (Billboard)	1
Czech Albums (ČNS IFPI)	3
Danish Albums (Hitlisten)	6
Dutch Albums (Album Top 100)	6
Finnish Albums (Suomen virallinen lista)	15
French Albums (SNEP)	29
German Albums (Offizielle Top 100)	11
Hungarian Albums (MAHASZ)	33
Irish Albums (IRMA)	3
Italian Albums (FIMI)	8
Japanese Albums (Oricon)	87
Latvian Albums (LaIPA)	77
New Zealand Albums (RMNZ)	1
Norwegian Albums (VG-lista)	4
Polish Albums (ZPAV)	13
Portuguese Albums (AFP)	10
Scottish Albums (Official Charts)	7
Slovak Albums (ČNS IFPI)	8
South Korean International Albums (Circle)	6
Spanish Albums (Promusicae)	9
Swedish Albums (Sverigetopplistan)	10
Swiss Albums (Schweizer Hitparade)	7
UK Albums (Official Charts)	5
US Billboard 200	1
US Top Alternative Albums (Billboard)	1

=== Year-end charts ===
Chart (2017)	Position
Australian Albums (ARIA)	13
Belgian Albums (Ultratop Flanders)	116
New Zealand Albums (RMNZ)	5
US Billboard 200	114
US Alternative Albums (Billboard)	8

Chart (2018)	Position
Australian Albums (ARIA)	67
New Zealand Albums (RMNZ)	32
US Alternative Albums (Billboard)	25

== Certifications and sales ==
Region	Certification	Certified units/sales
Australia (ARIA)	2× Platinum	140,000^{‡}
Austria (IFPI Austria)	Gold	7,500^{‡}
Canada (Music Canada)	2× Platinum	160,000^{‡}
China	—	164,000
Denmark (IFPI Danmark)	Platinum	20,000^{‡}
France (SNEP)	Gold	50,000^{‡}
Italy (FIMI)	Gold	25,000^{‡}
New Zealand (RMNZ)	4× Platinum	60,000^{‡}
Poland (ZPAV)	Gold	10,000^{‡}
Sweden (GLF)	Gold	15,000^{‡}
United Kingdom (BPI)	Gold	169,000 (Note: UK sales figures for Melodrama as of August 2021)
United States (RIAA)	Platinum	1,000,000^{‡}
Summaries
Worldwide	—	400,000
^{‡} Sales+streaming figures based on certification alone.

== Release history ==
Region	Date	Format	Label	Ref.
Various	16 June 2017	CD; digital download; streaming	Universal Music New Zealand	
United States	16 June 2017	CD	Lava; Republic	
Various	6 April 2018	LP	Universal Music New Zealand	
United States	6 April 2018	LP	Lava; Republic	

== See also ==
- List of Billboard 200 number-one albums of 2017
- List of number-one albums from the 2010s (New Zealand)
- List of number-one albums in New Zealand by New Zealand artists
- List of number-one albums of 2017 (Australia)
- List of number-one albums of 2017 (Canada)
