= He Was There (When I Needed You) =

Single by Tammy Wynette

from the album Only Lonely Sometimes
- B-side: "Only the Names Have Been Changed"
- Released: March 1980
- Recorded: January 1980
- Studio: Columbia Recording Studio; Nashville, Tennessee, U.S.
- Genre: Country
- Length: 3:15
- Label: Epic
- Songwriter: Sue Richards
- Producer: Billy Sherrill

Tammy Wynette singles chronology
"No One Else in the World" (1979)	"He Was There (When I Needed You)" (1980)	"Starting Over" (1980)

"He Was There (When I Needed You)" is a song written by Sue Richards, and recorded by American country music artist Tammy Wynette. It was released in March 1980 as the first single from the album Only Lonely Sometimes.

== Background and reception ==
"He Was There (When I Needed You)" was recorded in January 1980 at the Columbia Recording Studio in Nashville, Tennessee. The session featured tracks that would later appear on Wynette's 1980 album. The recording session was produced by Billy Sherrill and included renowned Nashville session musicians such as Johnny Gimble, Pete Drake and George Richey (Wynette's husband).

The song reached number 17 on the Billboard Hot Country Singles chart. It released on her 1980 studio album Only Lonely Sometimes.

== Track listing ==
7" vinyl single

- "He Was There (When I Needed You)" – 3:15
- "Only the Names Have Been Changed" – 3:11

== Charts ==
Chart (1980)	Peak position
US Hot Country Singles (Billboard)	17
Canada Country Singles (RPM)	28
