= Maturity =

Maturity or immaturity may refer to:

- Adulthood or age of majority
- Maturity model
  - Capability Maturity Model, in software engineering, a model representing the degree of formality and optimization of processes in an organization
- Developmental age, the age of an embryo as measured from the point of fertilization
- Mature technology, a technology has been in use and development for long enough that most of its initial problems have been overcome
- Maturity (finance), indicating the final date for payment of principal and interest
- Maturity (geology), rock, source rock, and hydrocarbon generation
- Maturity (psychological), the attainment of one's final level of psychological functioning and the integration of their personality into an organized whole
- Maturity (sedimentology), the proximity of a sedimentary deposit from its source
- Sexual maturity, the stage when an organism can reproduce, though this is distinct from adulthood

== See also ==
- Evolution
- Maturation (disambiguation)
- Mature (disambiguation)
