= No One Else in the World =

Single by Tammy Wynette

from the album Just Tammy
- B-side: "Mama Your Little Girl Fell"
- Released: May 1979
- Recorded: March 1979
- Studio: Columbia Recording Studio; Nashville, Tennessee, U.S.
- Genre: Country
- Length: 3:12
- Label: Epic
- Songwriters: Stephen Allen Davis; Billy Sherrill
- Producer: Billy Sherrill

Tammy Wynette singles chronology
"They Call It Making Love" (1979)	"No One Else in the World" (1979)	"He Was There (When I Needed You)" (1980)

"No One Else in the World" is a song written by Stephen Allen Davis and Billy Sherrill, and recorded by American country music artist Tammy Wynette. It was released in May 1979 as the second single from the album Just Tammy.

== Background and reception ==
"No One Else in the World" was first recorded in March 1979 at the Columbia Recording Studio in Nashville, Tennessee. Additional tracks were recorded during this session, which would ultimately become part of Wynette's studio album released with the single. The session was produced by Billy Sherrill and the song was issued as a single in January 1979.

The song reached number 7 on the Billboard Hot Country Singles chart. It released on her studio album Just Tammy.

== Track listing ==
7" vinyl single

- "No One Else in the World" – 3:12
- "Mama Your Little Girl Fell"

== Charts ==
Chart (1979)	Peak position
US Hot Country Singles (Billboard)	7
Canada Country Singles (RPM)	5
