= Mature =

Mature is the adjectival form of maturity, as immature is the adjectival form of immaturity, which have several meanings.

Mature or immature may also refer to:

- Mature, a character from The King of Fighters series
- "Mature 17+", a rating in the Entertainment Software Rating Board video game rating system
- Victor Mature (1913-1999), American actor
- Immature (band), an American boy band

== See also ==
- Adult (disambiguation)
- Maturation (disambiguation)
- Maturity (disambiguation)
- Ripeness
