= Adult (magazine) =

Magazine on eroticism

- Adult Magazine No. 1 Paperback; December 1, 2013
- Editor-in-chief: Sarah Nicole Prickett
- Creative director: Berkeley Poole
- Founded: 2013
- First issue: December 1, 2013; 12 years ago
- Country: United States
- Language: English
- Website: adult-mag.tumblr.com

Adult is a magazine of "new erotics" launched in November 2013 by editor-in-chief Sarah Nicole Prickett, creative director Berkeley Poole, publisher Noah Wunsch, and photo editor Jai Lennard. Lauren Festa later joined as assistant editor, as well as Cheyenne Skeete as editorial intern.

Writing in New York Magazine, Molly Fischer described the first issue as having a "spirit of exuberant debauchery." In The Daily Beast, Erin Cunningham said the magazine's "strong literary presence, combined with artistic photography, allows Adult to be so much more than the conventional idea of erotica." Other critics questioned whether the magazine really represented a departure from prior forms; at The New Republic, Diane Mehta wrote of Adult's first issue that "the most surprising thing about it is just how traditionally masculine its view of female sexuality is." Prickett acknowledged this, telling New York Magazine, "I'm just going to be really honest with you — if you look at the photos in the first magazine, there's nothing shocking. There's nothing really that you haven't seen before...What's actually in this magazine — the photos that I would call more conservative — are the photos that the guys liked"; going forward, however, Prickett said she and Poole would have more visual creative control, with plans to include more photographs of men as well as greater size diversity among models depicted. Poole and Prickett have subsequently run the magazine.

Originally only available in print, Adult debuted a website in April 2014. Writing for Flavorwire, Elisabeth Donnelly said the site's "sensual, intellectual take on sexuality fills a gap in the erotic life online...It feels — forgive me — millennial, with a joyful, everybody-in-the-pool take on sexuality.
