= Maturation =

Maturation may refer to:

== Science ==
- Developmental psychology
- Foetal development
- Maturity (geology), in petroleum geology
- Maturation, as a threat to internal validity of an experiment
- Tissue maturation, an aspect of developmental biology
  - The final stages of cellular differentiation of cells, tissues, or organs

== See also ==
- Expiration (disambiguation)
- Maturity (disambiguation)
- Mature (disambiguation)
