= Copyright expiration =

Copyright expiration may refer to:

- Expiration of copyright under Public domain
- Copyright expiration in Australia
