= Early adulthood (disambiguation) =

Emerging adulthood and early adulthood (also called young adulthood) is the stage of life between adolescence and full-fledged adulthood.

Early adulthood or young adulthood may also refer to:

- Young adulthood stage in Erik Erikson's model between early and middle adulthood.
- Late adolescence, the last stages of biological, cognitive, and social development that occur during adolescence.
- Age of majority, the legal age of adulthood.
