= Noah Wunsch =

German painter, photographer, and designer

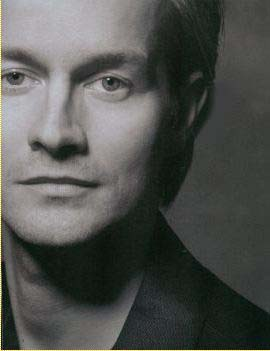
Noah Wunsch

Noah Wunsch (born 1970 in Rendsburg) is a painter, photographer, and designer from Germany.

== Life ==
Noah Wunsch studied design at the well-known, Hamburg based artist Ursula Unbehaun. He attended the University for Music and Art in Vienna, Austria. As a photographer, he was taught by Christoph Rüdt von Collenberg and Wolfgang Klein. Later he studied acting, music and dancing at the Stella-Academy in Hamburg. Noah Wunsch is living and always travelling between Paris, Hamburg, New York City and California. The artist is known for his charity support.

== Paintings ==
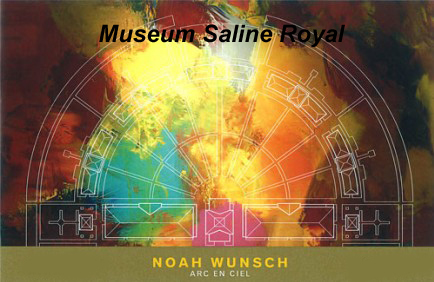
Noah Wunsch Exhibition "Arc en Ciel" in France

The artist focuses on very big and colourful paintings, also altar paintings for churches. The Picasso-organizer Thierry de la Fontaine considered his work "to be full of energy and fruitfulness. From it comes a real light, both from within and from a spiritual point of view!". Some of his paintings, that he created in Mexico, France, USA, Germany or Italy are up to 12 m long and considered to be of high value. One of history the biggest paintings of almost 200 meters has been created by Noah Wunsch and attracted a huge number of visitors at the world heritage site Royal Saltworks at Arc-et-Senans in France. His deep faith inspired the artist to create a bible for children with his images. Worldwide, the painter has shown his work in many exhibitions, from Vienna, Hamburg, Toulouse, Madrid, Chicago, New York City to Mexico.

== Photography ==
As a photographer, Noah Wunsch created portraits of many celebrities, such as David Copperfield, Richard von Weizsäcker, John Neumeier, Claudia Schiffer and Diana Ross. As a photographer. Noah Wunsch worked on the fashion shows in Paris for labels like Yves St. Laurent, Chanel and Karl Lagerfeld. His pictures, published by well-known companies like Gruner & Jahr, Jahreszeiten-Verlag, Bauer Verlag and Mont Blanc, are characterized by clarity and sensibility for the small details.

== Fashion ==
Since 2006, Noah Wunsch has also worked as a fashion designer. His designs have been described as distinct from contemporary fashion trends, and he has primarily produced pieces for a limited clientele.
