= Womanhood (song) =

Single by Tammy Wynette

from the album Womanhood
- B-side: "50 Words or Less"
- Released: June 1978
- Recorded: 1978
- Genre: Country
- Length: 2:51
- Label: Epic
- Songwriter: Bobby Braddock
- Producer: Billy Sherrill

Tammy Wynette singles chronology
"I'd Like to See Jesus (On the Midnight Special)" (1978)	"Womanhood" (1978)	"They Call It Making Love" (1979)

"Womanhood" is a song written by Bobby Braddock, and recorded by American country music artist Tammy Wynette. In Braddock's 2015 memoir, A Life on Nashville's Music Row, he described it as "a song about a girl having a tearful talk with God about losing her virginity." Braddock initially discarded the song after writing it but was convinced by his fiancée to play it for his music publisher.

It was released in June 1978 as the second single and title track from her album Womanhood. The song peaked at number 3 and was her last to reach the top five of Billboard Hot Country Singles chart.

== Track listing ==
7" vinyl single

- "Womanhood"
- "50 Words or Less"

== Chart performance ==
Chart (1978)	Peak position
US Hot Country Songs (Billboard)	3
Canadian RPM Country Tracks	3
