= List of songs recorded by Elvis Costello =

Songs by English singer-songwriter

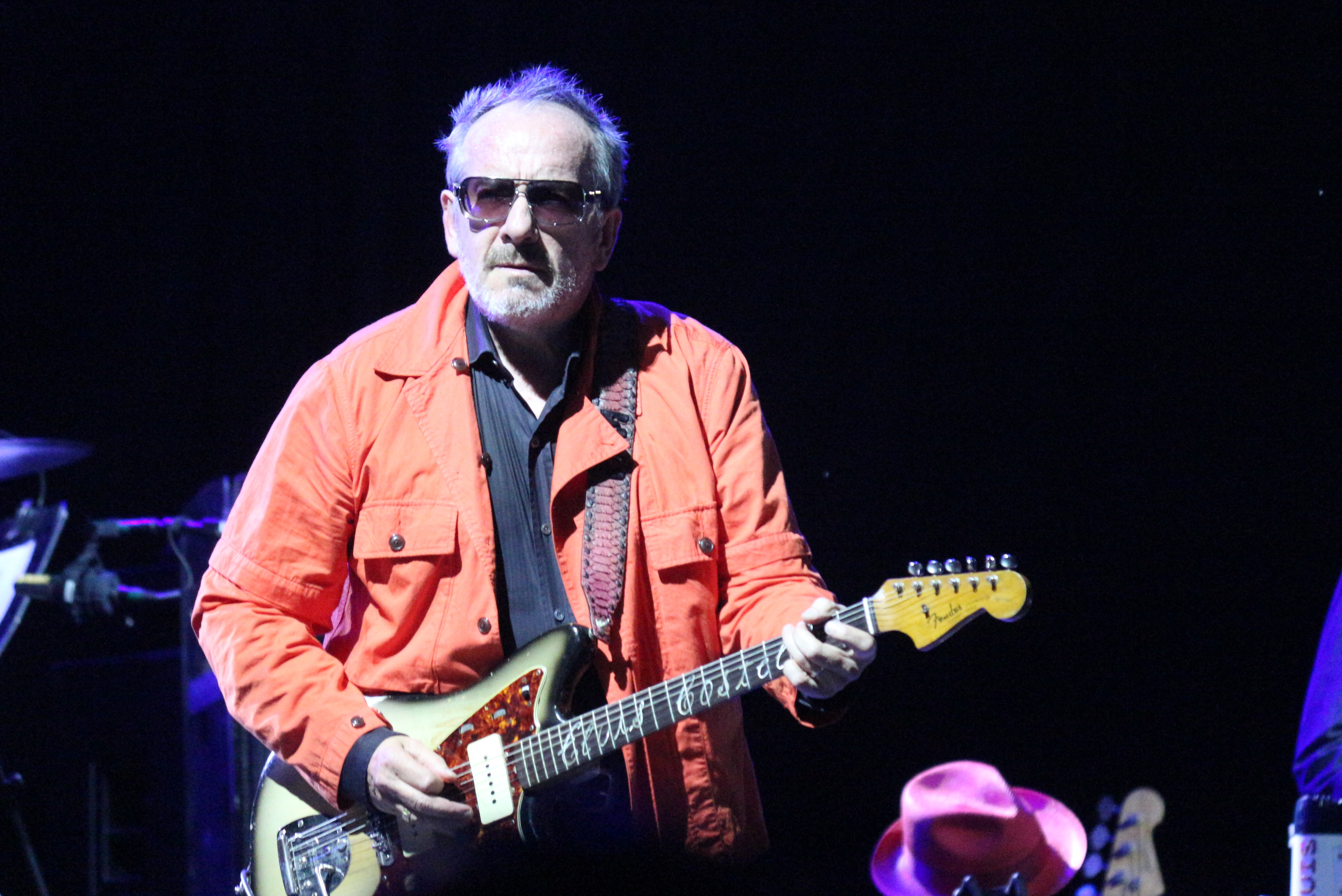
Elvis Costello performing in 2021

Elvis Costello is an English singer-songwriter who has recorded songs over a career beginning in the 1970s. He has recorded material as a solo artist, with his backing bands the Attractions and the Imposters, and has recorded collaborative projects with artists such as the Brodsky Quartet, Allen Toussaint, Burt Bacharach, T Bone Burnett and the Roots.

== Songs as solo artist and bandleader ==
Beginning with King of America (1986), Costello has credited many of his songs to his real name, Declan MacManus.

Key
| † | Indicates songs written by others and traditional songs |
| ‡ | Indicates live recording |

Name of song, artist credit, writer(s), original release, producer(s), and year of release
| Song | Artist(s) | Writer(s) | Original release(s) | Producer(s) | Year | Ref(s) |
|---|---|---|---|---|---|---|
| "13 Steps Lead Down" | Elvis Costello | Declan MacManus | Brutal Youth | Elvis Costello; Mitchell Froom | 1994 | |
| "15 Petals" | Elvis Costello | Elvis Costello | When I Was Cruel | The Imposter (Note: The Imposter is a pseudonym for Costello, Cíaran Cahil, Leo Pearson, Kieran Lynch, and Kevin Killen.) | 2002 | |
| "20% Amnesia" | Elvis Costello | Declan MacManus | Brutal Youth | Elvis Costello; Mitchell Froom | 1994 | |
| "45" | Elvis Costello | Elvis Costello | When I Was Cruel | The Imposter | 2002 | |
| "5ive Gears in Reverse" | Elvis Costello and the Attractions | Elvis Costello | Get Happy!! | Nick Lowe | 1980 | |
| "Abandon Words" | Elvis Costello | Declan MacManus | Brutal Youth (2002 reissue) | Elvis Costello | 2002 | |
| "Accidents Will Happen" | Elvis Costello and the Attractions | Elvis Costello | Armed Forces | Nick Lowe | 1979 | |
| "Adieu Paris (L'Envie Des Étoiles)" | Elvis Costello & the Imposters | Elvis Costello | Look Now (Regarde Maintenant EP) | Elvis Costello; Sebastian Krys | 2018 | |
| "After the Fall" | Elvis Costello | Declan MacManus | Mighty Like a Rose | Mitchell Froom; Kevin Killen; Declan MacManus | 1991 | |
| "Alibi" | Elvis Costello | Elvis Costello | When I Was Cruel | The Imposter | 2002 | |
| "Alison" | Elvis Costello | Elvis Costello | My Aim Is True | Nick Lowe | 1977 | |
| "All Grown Up" | Elvis Costello | Declan MacManus | Mighty Like a Rose | Mitchell Froom; Kevin Killen; Declan MacManus | 1991 | |
| "All the Rage" | Elvis Costello | Declan MacManus | Brutal Youth | Elvis Costello; Mitchell Froom | 1994 | |
| "All These Strangers" | Elvis Costello | Elvis Costello; T Bone Burnett | National Ransom | T Bone Burnett | 2010 | |
| "All These Things" (The Uniques cover) | Elvis Costello | Allen Toussaint † | Blood & Chocolate (2002 reissue) | Nick Lowe | 2002 | |
| "All This Useless Beauty" | Elvis Costello and the Attractions | Declan MacManus | All This Useless Beauty | Geoff Emerick; Elvis Costello | 1996 | |
| "Almost Blue" | Elvis Costello and the Attractions | Elvis Costello | Imperial Bedroom | Geoff Emerick | 1982 | |
| "Almost Ideal Eyes" | Elvis Costello and the Attractions | Declan MacManus | B-side of "Little Atoms" | Geoff Emerick; Elvis Costello | 1996 | |
| "American Without Tears" (Note: A sequel track, titled "American Without Tears No. 2 (Twilight Version)", was released as the B-side of "Blue Chair" in 1987.) | The Costello Show featuring the Attractions and the Confederates | Declan ManManus | King of America | T Bone Burnett; Declan MacManus | 1986 | |
| "American Gangster Time" | Elvis Costello and the Imposters | Elvis Costello | Momofuku | Elvis Costello; Jason Lader | 2008 | |
| "...And in Every Home" | Elvis Costello and the Attractions | Elvis Costello | Imperial Bedroom | Geoff Emerick | 1982 | |
| "(The Angels Wanna Wear My) Red Shoes" | Elvis Costello | Elvis Costello | My Aim Is True | Nick Lowe | 1977 | |
| "Any King's Schilling" | Elvis Costello | Elvis Costello | Spike | Elvis Costello; Kevin Killen; T Bone Burnett | 1989 | |
| "B Movie" | Elvis Costello and the Attractions | Elvis Costello | Get Happy!! | Nick Lowe | 1980 | |
| "Baby Pictures" | Elvis Costello and the Attractions | Elvis Costello | Punch the Clock (2003 reissue) | Elvis Costello | 2003 | |
| "Baby Plays Around" | Elvis Costello | Elvis Costello; Cait O'Riordan | Spike | Elvis Costello; Kevin Killen; T Bone Burnett | 1989 | |
| "Baby's Got a Brand New Hairdo" | The Costello Show featuring the Attractions | Declan MacManus | B-side of "Don't Let Me Be Misunderstood"; Out of Our Idiot | T Bone Burnett; Declan MacManus | 1986 | |
| "Backstabbers" (Note: Performed in a medley with "King Horse") ‡ (The O'Jays cover) | Elvis Costello and the Attractions | Leon Huff; Gene McFadden; John Whitehead † | Punch the Clock (2003 reissue) | Elvis Costello | 2003 | |
| "Bama Lama Bama Loo" (Little Richard cover) | Elvis Costello | Little Richard † | Kojak Variety | Elvis Costello; Kevin Killen | 1995 | |
| "Basement Kiss" (First released by Wendy James in 1993) | Elvis Costello | Declan MacManus; Cait O'Riordan | "13 Steps Lead Down" EP | Mitchell Froom; Elvis Costello | 1994 | |
| "Battered Old Bird" | Elvis Costello and the Attractions | Declan MacManus | Blood & Chocolate | Nick Lowe | 1986 | |
| "The Beat" | Elvis Costello and the Attractions (Note: Originally credited solely to Costello, later reissues are credited to Elvis Costello and the Attractions.) | Elvis Costello | This Year's Model | Nick Lowe | 1978 | |
| "Beaten to the Punch" | Elvis Costello and the Attractions | Elvis Costello | Get Happy!! | Nick Lowe | 1980 | |
| "Bedlam" | Elvis Costello & the Imposters | Elvis Costello | The Delivery Man | Elvis Costello; Dennis Herring | 2004 | |
| "The Bells" ‡ (The Originals cover) | Elvis Costello and the Attractions | Johnny Bristol; Marvin Gaye; Anna Gordy; Elgie Stover † | Punch the Clock (2003 reissue) | Elvis Costello | 2003 | |
| "Betrayal" | The Costello Show featuring the Attractions | Declan MacManus | King of America (2005 reissue) | Declan MacManus | 2005 | |
| "Beyond Belief" | Elvis Costello and the Attractions | Elvis Costello | Imperial Bedroom | Geoff Emerick | 1982 | |
| "Big Boys" | Elvis Costello and the Attractions | Elvis Costello | Armed Forces | Nick Lowe | 1979 | |
| "Big Boys Cry" (Eddy Raven cover) | Elvis Costello | Eddy Raven † | National Ransom (National Ransack EP) | T Bone Burnett | 2010 | |
| "The Big Light" | The Costello Show featuring the Attractions and the Confederates | Declan ManManus | King of America | T Bone Burnett; Declan MacManus | 1986 | |
| "Big Sister" | Elvis Costello and the Attractions | Elvis Costello | B-side of "You Little Fool"; Out of Our Idiot | Nick Lowe | 1982 | |
| "Big Sister's Clothes" | Elvis Costello and the Attractions | Elvis Costello | Trust | Nick Lowe; Roger Béchirian | 1981 | |
| "Big Tears" | Elvis Costello and the Attractions | Elvis Costello | B-side of "Pump It Up"; Taking Liberties | Nick Lowe | 1978 | |
| "Black and White World" | Elvis Costello and the Attractions | Elvis Costello | Get Happy!! | Nick Lowe | 1980 | |
| "Black Sails in the Sunset" (Note: An early version appears on the 1994 reissue of Trust.) | Elvis Costello and the Attractions | Elvis Costello | B-side of "Tokyo Storm Warning" (12"); Out of Our Idiot | Nick Lowe; Colin Fairley | 1986 | |
| "Blame It on Cain" | Elvis Costello | Elvis Costello | My Aim Is True | Nick Lowe | 1977 | |
| "Blue Chair" | Elvis Costello and the Attractions | Declan MacManus | Blood & Chocolate | Nick Lowe | 1986 | |
| "Blue Murder On Union Avenue" | Elvis Costello | Elvis Costello | Goodbye Cruel World (2004 reissue) | Elvis Costello | 2004 | |
| "Blues Keep Calling" ‡ (Janis Martin cover) | Elvis Costello and the Attractions | Janis Martin † | Almost Blue (2004 reissue) | Billy Sherrill | 2004 | |
| "Bottom Awakes" | Elvis Costello | Elvis Costello | Il Sogno | Sid McLauchlan | 2004 | |
| "The Boy Named If" | Elvis Costello and the Imposters | Elvis Costello | The Boy Named If | Elvis Costello; Sebastian Krys | 2022 | |
| "Boy With a Problem" | Elvis Costello and the Attractions | Elvis Costello; Chris Difford | Imperial Bedroom | Geoff Emerick | 1982 | |
| "Brand New Heartache" ‡ (The Everly Brothers cover) | Elvis Costello and the Attractions | Felice and Boudleaux Bryant † | Almost Blue (2004 reissue) | Billy Sherrill | 2004 | |
| "The Bridge I Burned" | Elvis Costello | Elvis Costello | Extreme Honey: The Very Best of the Warner Brothers Years | – | 1997 | |
| "Brilliant Disguise" (Bruce Springsteen cover) | Elvis Costello | Bruce Springsteen † | Kojak Variety (2004 reissue) | Elvis Costello; Kevin Killen | 2004 | |
| "Brilliant Mistake" | The Costello Show featuring the Attractions and the Confederates | Declan ManManus | King of America | T Bone Burnett; Declan MacManus | 1986 | |
| "Broken" | Elvis Costello | Cait O'Riordan † | Mighty Like a Rose | Mitchell Froom; Kevin Killen; Declan MacManus | 1991 | |
| "Brown to Blue" (George Jones cover) | Elvis Costello and the Attractions | George Jones; Virginia Franks "Country" Johnny Mathis † | Almost Blue | Billy Sherrill | 1981 | |
| "Bullets for the New-Born King" | Elvis Costello | Elvis Costello | National Ransom | T Bone Burnett | 2010 | |
| "Burnt Sugar Is So Bitter" | Elvis Costello & the Imposters | Elvis Costello; Carole King | Look Now | Elvis Costello; Sebastian Krys | 2018 | |
| "Busy Bodies" | Elvis Costello and the Attractions | Elvis Costello | Armed Forces | Nick Lowe | 1979 | |
| "But Not for Me" (Ginger Rogers cover) | Elvis Costello | George Gershwin; Ira Gershwin † | Kojak Variety (2004 reissue) | Elvis Costello; Kevin Killen | 2004 | |
| "Button My Lip" | Elvis Costello & the Imposters | Elvis Costello | The Delivery Man | Elvis Costello; Dennis Herring | 2004 | |
| "Byline" | Elvis Costello | Elvis Costello | Hey Clockface | Elvis Costello; Sebastian Krys; Michael Leonhart | 2020 | |
| "Can You Be True?" | Elvis Costello | Elvis Costello | North | Elvis Costello; Kevin Killen | 2003 | |
| "Changing Partners" | Elvis Costello | Larry Coleman; Joe Darion † | Secret, Profane & Sugarcane | T Bone Burnett | 2009 | |
| "Charm School" | Elvis Costello and the Attractions | Elvis Costello | Punch the Clock | Clive Langer; Alan Winstanley | 1983 | |
| "Cheap Reward" | Elvis Costello | Elvis Costello | My Aim Is True (1993 reissue) | Nick Lowe | 1993 | |
| "Chemistry Class" | Elvis Costello and the Attractions | Elvis Costello | Armed Forces | Nick Lowe | 1979 | |
| "Chewing Gum" | Elvis Costello | Elvis Costello | Spike | Elvis Costello; Kevin Killen; T Bone Burnett | 1989 | |
| "Church Underground" | Elvis Costello | Elvis Costello | National Ransom | T Bone Burnett | 2010 | |
| "Clean Money" | Elvis Costello | Elvis Costello | Taking Liberties | Nick Lowe | 1980 | |
| "Clown Strike" | Elvis Costello | Declan MacManus | Brutal Youth | Elvis Costello; Mitchell Froom | 1994 | |
| "Clowntime is Over" | Elvis Costello and the Attractions | Elvis Costello | Get Happy!! | Nick Lowe | 1980 | |
| "Clubland" | Elvis Costello and the Attractions | Elvis Costello | Trust | Nick Lowe; Roger Béchirian | 1981 | |
| "Coal-Train Robberies" | Elvis Costello | Elvis Costello | Spike | Elvis Costello; Kevin Killen; T Bone Burnett | 1989 | |
| "Color of the Blues" (George Jones cover) | Elvis Costello and the Attractions | Lawton Williams; George Jones † | Almost Blue | Billy Sherrill | 1981 | |
| "The Comedians" | Elvis Costello and the Attractions | Elvis Costello | Goodbye Cruel World | Clive Langer; Alan Winstanley | 1984 | |
| "Complicated Shadows" (Note: A re-recording appears on Secret, Profane & Sugarcane (2009), produced by T Bone Burnett) | Elvis Costello and the Attractions | Declan MacManus | All This Useless Beauty | Geoff Emerick; Elvis Costello | 1996 | |
| "Condemned Men" | Elvis Costello | Elvis Costello | National Ransom (National Ransack EP) | T Bone Burnett | 2010 | |
| "Congratulations" (Paul Simon cover) | Elvis Costello | Paul Simon † | Kojak Variety (2004 reissue) | Elvis Costello; Kevin Killen | 2004 | |
| "The Conspiracy of Oberon and Puck" | Elvis Costello | Elvis Costello | Il Sogno | Sid McLauchlan | 2004 | |
| "Couldn't Call It Unexpected No. 4" | Elvis Costello | Declan MacManus | Mighty Like a Rose | Mitchell Froom; Kevin Killen; Declan MacManus | 1991 | |
| "Country Darkness" | Elvis Costello & the Imposters | Elvis Costello | The Delivery Man | Elvis Costello; Dennis Herring | 2004 | |
| "The Court" | Elvis Costello | Elvis Costello | Il Sogno | Sid McLauchlan | 2004 | |
| "Crawling to the U.S.A." | Elvis Costello and the Attractions | Elvis Costello | Taking Liberties | Nick Lowe | 1980 | |
| "Crimes of Paris" | Elvis Costello and the Attractions | Declan MacManus | Blood & Chocolate | Nick Lowe | 1986 | |
| "The Crooked Line" | Elvis Costello | Elvis Costello; T Bone Burnett | Secret, Profane & Sugarcane | T Bone Burnett | 2009 | |
| "Cry, Cry, Cry" ‡ (Johnny Cash cover) | Elvis Costello and the Attractions | Johnny Cash † | Almost Blue (1994 reissue) | Billy Sherrill | 1994 | |
| "Daddy Can I Turn This?" | Elvis Costello | Elvis Costello | When I Was Cruel | The Imposter | 2002 | |
| "Danger Zone" (Ray Charles cover) | Elvis Costello and the Attractions | Percy Mayfield † | Punch the Clock (2003 reissue) | Elvis Costello | 2003 | |
| "The Dark End of the Street" (James Carr cover) | Elvis Costello | Chips Moman; Dan Penn † | Kojak Variety (2004 reissue) (Note: Also appears on the deluxe edition of The Delivery Man) | Elvis Costello; Kevin Killen | 2004 | |
| "Darling, You Know I Wouldn't Lie" ‡ (Conway Twitty cover) | Elvis Costello and the Attractions | Red Lane; Wayne Kemp † | Almost Blue (1994 reissue) | Billy Sherrill | 1994 | |
| "Days" (The Kinks cover) | Elvis Costello | Ray Davies † | Kojak Variety | Elvis Costello; Kevin Killen | 1995 | |
| "The Days Take Care of Everything" | Elvis Costello | Declan MacManus; Paul McCartney | All This Useless Beauty (2001 reissue) | Elvis Costello | 2001 | |
| "The Death of Magic Thinking" | Elvis Costello and the Imposters | Elvis Costello | The Boy Named If | Elvis Costello; Sebastian Krys | 2022 | |
| "Deep Dark Truthful Mirror" | Elvis Costello | Elvis Costello | Spike | Elvis Costello; Kevin Killen; T Bone Burnett | 1989 | |
| "The Deportees Club" (Note: A demo titled "Deportee" appears on the 1995 reissue of Goodbye Cruel World) | Elvis Costello and the Attractions | Elvis Costello | Goodbye Cruel World | Clive Langer; Alan Winstanley | 1984 | |
| "The Delivery Man" | Elvis Costello & the Imposters | Elvis Costello | The Delivery Man | Elvis Costello; Dennis Herring | 2004 | |
| "The Difference" | Elvis Costello and the Imposters | Elvis Costello | The Boy Named If | Elvis Costello; Sebastian Krys | 2022 | |
| "Different Finger" | Elvis Costello and the Attractions | Elvis Costello | Trust | Nick Lowe; Roger Béchirian | 1981 | |
| "Dirty Rotten Shame" (First released by Ronnie Drew in 1995) | Elvis Costello | Elvis Costello | B-side of "Complicated Shadows" | T Bone Burnett | 2009 | |
| "Dishonor the Stars" | Elvis Costello & the Imposters | Elvis Costello | Look Now | Elvis Costello; Sebastian Krys | 2018 | |
| "Dissolve" | Elvis Costello | Elvis Costello | When I Was Cruel | The Imposter | 2002 | |
| "Distorted Angel" | Elvis Costello and the Attractions | Declan MacManus | All This Useless Beauty | Geoff Emerick; Elvis Costello | 1996 | |
| "Do You Know What I'm Saying?" (First recorded by Wendy James in 1993) | Elvis Costello | Declan MacManus | B-side of "13 Steps Lead Down" | Mitchell Froom; Elvis Costello | 1994 | |
| "Don't Let Me Be Misunderstood" (Nina Simone cover) | The Costello Show featuring the Attractions and the Confederates | Bennie Benjamin; Sol Marcus; Gloria Caldwell † | King of America | T Bone Burnett; Declan MacManus | 1986 | |
| "Don't Look Back"‡ (Smokey Robinson cover) | Elvis Costello and the Attractions | Ronnie White; Smokey Robinson † | Get Happy!! (2003 reissue) | Elvis Costello | 2003 | |
| "Don't Look Now" | Elvis Costello & the Imposters | Burt Bacharach; Elvis Costello | Look Now | Elvis Costello; Sebastian Krys | 2018 | |
| "Down Among the Wines and Spirits" | Elvis Costello | Elvis Costello | Secret, Profane & Sugarcane | T Bone Burnett | 2009 | |
| "Down on the Bottom" (Note: Originally featured on Lost on the River: The New Basement Tapes (2014)) | Elvis Costello & the Imposters | Elvis Costello; Bob Dylan | Purse (EP) | Elvis Costello; Sebastian Krys | 2019 | |
| "Dr. Luther's Assistant" | Elvis Costello and the Attractions | Elvis Costello | B-side of "New Amsterdam"; Taking Liberties | Nick Lowe | 1980 | |
| "Dr. Watson, I Presume" | Elvis Costello | Elvis Costello | National Ransom | T Bone Burnett | 2010 | |
| "Drum & Bone" | Elvis Costello and the Imposters | Elvis Costello | Momofuku | Elvis Costello; Jason Lader | 2008 | |
| "A Drunken Man's Praise of Sobriety" | Elvis Costello | Declan MacManus; William Butler Yeats | B-side of "Sulky Girl" | Mitchell Froom; Elvis Costello | 1994 | |
| "...Dust" | Elvis Costello | Elvis Costello | When I Was Cruel | The Imposter | 2002 | |
| "Dust 2..." | Elvis Costello | Elvis Costello | When I Was Cruel | The Imposter | 2002 | |
| "Eisenhower Blues" (J. B. Lenoir cover) | The Costello Show featuring the Attractions and the Confederates | J. B. Lenoir † | King of America | T Bone Burnett; Declan MacManus | 1986 | |
| "Either Side of the Same Town" | Elvis Costello & the Imposters | Elvis Costello; Jerry Ragovoy | The Delivery Man | Elvis Costello; Dennis Herring | 2004 | |
| "The Element Within Her" | Elvis Costello and the Attractions | Elvis Costello | Punch the Clock | Clive Langer; Alan Winstanley | 1983 | |
| "End of the Rainbow" | The Costello Show | Declan MacManus | King of America (2005 reissue) | Declan MacManus | 2005 | |
| "Episode of Blonde" | Elvis Costello | Elvis Costello | When I Was Cruel | The Imposter | 2002 | |
| "Everybody's Crying Mercy" (Mose Allison cover) | Elvis Costello | Mose Allison † | Kojak Variety | Elvis Costello; Kevin Killen | 1995 | |
| "Everyday I Write the Book" | Elvis Costello and the Attractions | Elvis Costello | Punch the Clock | Clive Langer; Alan Winstanley | 1983 | |
| "Everyone's Playing House" | Elvis Costello & the Imposters | Burt Bacharach; Elvis Costello | Purse (EP) | Elvis Costello; Sebastian Krys | 2019 | |
| "The Face of Bottom" | Elvis Costello | Elvis Costello | Il Sogno | Sid McLauchlan | 2004 | |
| "The Fairy and the Ass" | Elvis Costello | Elvis Costello | Il Sogno | Sid McLauchlan | 2004 | |
| "Fallen" | Elvis Costello | Elvis Costello | North | Elvis Costello; Kevin Killen | 2003 | |
| "Farewell, OK" | Elvis Costello and the Imposters | Elvis Costello | The Boy Named If | Elvis Costello; Sebastian Krys | 2022 | |
| "Favourite Hour" | Elvis Costello | Declan MacManus | Brutal Youth | Elvis Costello; Mitchell Froom | 1994 | |
| "Femme Fatale" (The Velvet Underground cover) | Elvis Costello | Lou Reed † | Secret, Profane & Sugarcane (LP, Japan CD and iTunes editions) | T Bone Burnett | 2009 | |
| "The Final Mrs. Curtain" | Elvis Costello & the Imposters | Elvis Costello | Look Now (Regarde Maintenant EP) | Elvis Costello; Sebastian Krys | 2018 | |
| "Fish 'n' Chip Paper" | Elvis Costello and the Attractions | Elvis Costello | Trust | Nick Lowe; Roger Béchirian | 1981 | |
| "Five Small Words" | Elvis Costello | Elvis Costello | National Ransom | T Bone Burnett | 2010 | |
| "The Flirting Kind" | Elvis Costello and the Attractions | Elvis Costello | B-side of "Let Them All Talk"; Out of Our Idiot | Clive Langer; Alan Winstanley | 1983 | |
| "Flutter & Wow" | Elvis Costello and the Imposters | Elvis Costello | Momofuku | Elvis Costello; Jason Lader | 2008 | |
| "From a Whisper to a Scream" | Elvis Costello and the Attractions | Elvis Costello | Trust | Nick Lowe; Roger Béchirian | 1981 | |
| "From Head to Toe" (Smokey Robinson cover) | Elvis Costello and the Attractions | Smokey Robinson † | Non-album single Out of Our Idiot | Geoff Emerick | 1982 | |
| "Full Force Gale" (Van Morrison cover) | Elvis Costello | Van Morrison † | Kojak Variety (2004 reissue) | Elvis Costello; Kevin Killen | 2004 | |
| "Georgie and Her Rival" | Elvis Costello | Declan MacManus | Mighty Like a Rose | Mitchell Froom; Kevin Killen; Declan MacManus | 1991 | |
| "Get Yourself Another Fool" | Elvis Costello and the Attractions | Frank Haywood; Ernest Tucker † | B-side of "Don't Let Me Be Misunderstood"; Out of Our Idiot | Nick Lowe; Colin Fairley | 1986 | |
| "Getting Mighty Crowded" (Betty Everett cover) | Elvis Costello and the Attractions | Van McCoy † | B-side of "High Fidelity"; Taking Liberties | Nick Lowe | 1980 | |
| "Ghost Train" | Elvis Costello and the Attractions | Elvis Costello | B-side of "New Amsterdam"; Taking Liberties | Nick Lowe | 1980 | |
| "Girls Talk" (First recorded by Dave Edmunds in 1978) | Elvis Costello and the Attractions | Elvis Costello | B-side of "I Can't Stand Up for Falling Down"; Taking Liberties | Nick Lowe | 1980 | |
| "Glitter Gulch" | The Costello Show featuring the Attractions and the Confederates | Declan ManManus | King of America | T Bone Burnett; Declan MacManus | 1986 | |
| "Gloomy Sunday" (Hal Kemp cover) | Elvis Costello and the Attractions | Rezső Seress; Sam M. Lewis † | Trust (1994 reissue) | Elvis Costello | 1994 | |
| "Go Away" | Elvis Costello and the Imposters | Elvis Costello | Momofuku | Elvis Costello; Jason Lader | 2008 | |
| "God's Comic" | Elvis Costello | Elvis Costello | Spike | Elvis Costello; Kevin Killen; T Bone Burnett | 1989 | |
| "Good Year for the Roses" (George Jones cover) | Elvis Costello and the Attractions | Jerry Chesnut † | Almost Blue | Billy Sherrill | 1981 | |
| "Goon Squad" | Elvis Costello and the Attractions | Elvis Costello | Armed Forces | Nick Lowe | 1979 | |
| "The Great Unknown" | Elvis Costello and the Attractions | Elvis Costello; Clive Langer | Goodbye Cruel World | Clive Langer; Alan Winstanley | 1984 | |
| "The Greatest Thing" | Elvis Costello and the Attractions | Elvis Costello | Punch the Clock | Clive Langer; Alan Winstanley | 1983 | |
| "Green Shirt" | Elvis Costello and the Attractions | Elvis Costello | Armed Forces | Nick Lowe | 1979 | |
| "Hand in Hand" | Elvis Costello and the Attractions | Elvis Costello | This Year's Model | Nick Lowe | 1978 | |
| "Harpies Bizarre" | Elvis Costello | Declan MacManus | Mighty Like a Rose | Mitchell Froom; Kevin Killen; Declan MacManus | 1991 | |
| "Harry Worth" | Elvis Costello and the Imposters | Elvis Costello | Momofuku | Elvis Costello; Jason Lader | 2008 | |
| "Having It All" | The Costello Show | Declan MacManus | King of America (2005 reissue) | Declan MacManus | 2005 | |
| "Heart Shaped Bruise" | Elvis Costello & the Imposters | Elvis Costello | The Delivery Man | Elvis Costello; Dennis Herring | 2004 | |
| "Heathen Town" | Elvis Costello and the Attractions | Elvis Costello | B-side of "Everyday I Write the Book"; Out of Our Idiot | Clive Langer; Alan Winstanley | 1983 | |
| "Hermia and Lysander" | Elvis Costello | Elvis Costello | Il Sogno | Sid McLauchlan | 2004 | |
| "Hetty O'Hara Confidential" | Elvis Costello | Elvis Costello | Hey Clockface | Elvis Costello; Sebastian Krys; Michael Leonhart | 2020 | |
| "Hey Clockface / How Can You Face Me?" | Elvis Costello | Elvis Costello; Fats Waller; Andy Razaf | Hey Clockface | Elvis Costello; Sebastian Krys; Michael Leonhart | 2020 | |
| "He'll Have to Go" ‡ (Jim Reeves cover) | Elvis Costello and the Attractions | Joe Allison; Audrey Allison † | Almost Blue (2004 reissue) | Billy Sherrill | 2004 | |
| "He's Given Me Things" | Elvis Costello & the Imposters | Burt Bacharach; Elvis Costello | Look Now | Elvis Costello; Sebastian Krys | 2018 | |
| "He's Got You" ‡ (Hank Cochran cover) | Elvis Costello and the Attractions | Hank Cochran † | Almost Blue (1994 reissue) | Billy Sherrill | 1994 | |
| "Hidden Charms" (Willie Dixon cover) | Elvis Costello | Willie Dixon † | Kojak Variety | Elvis Costello; Kevin Killen | 1995 | |
| "Hidden Shame" (Note: A demo appears on the 2001 reissue of All This Useless Beauty) | Elvis Costello | Elvis Costello | Secret, Profane & Sugarcane | T Bone Burnett | 2009 | |
| "High Fidelity" | Elvis Costello and the Attractions | Elvis Costello | Get Happy!! | Nick Lowe | 1980 | |
| "Home Is Anywhere You Hang Your Head" | Elvis Costello and the Attractions | Declan MacManus | Blood & Chocolate | Nick Lowe | 1986 | |
| "Home Truth" | Elvis Costello and the Attractions | Elvis Costello | Goodbye Cruel World | Clive Langer; Alan Winstanley | 1984 | |
| "Honey Hush" (Big Joe Turner cover) | Elvis Costello and the Attractions | Lou Willie Turner † | Almost Blue | Billy Sherrill | 1981 | |
| "Honeyhouse (Cruel No. 2)" | Elvis Costello | Elvis Costello | Cruel Smile | The Imposter | 2002 | |
| "Honey, Are You Straight or Are You Blind?" | Elvis Costello and the Attractions | Declan MacManus | Blood & Chocolate | Nick Lowe | 1986 | |
| "Honky Talk Girl" ‡ (Loretta Lynn cover) | Elvis Costello and the Attractions | Loretta Lynn † | Almost Blue (2004 reissue) | Billy Sherrill | 2004 | |
| "Hoover Factory" | Elvis Costello | Elvis Costello | Taking Liberties | Nick Lowe | 1980 | |
| "How Deep Is the Red" | Elvis Costello | Elvis Costello | Secret, Profane & Sugarcane | T Bone Burnett | 2009 | |
| "How Long Has This Been Going On?" (Bobbe Arnst cover) | Elvis Costello | George Gershwin; Ira Gershwin † | Kojak Variety (2004 reissue) | Elvis Costello; Kevin Killen | 2004 | |
| "How Much I've Lied" (Gram Parsons cover) | Elvis Costello and the Attractions | Gram Parsons; Pam Rifkin † | Almost Blue | Billy Sherrill | 1981 | |
| "How to Be Dumb" | Elvis Costello | Declan MacManus | Mighty Like a Rose | Mitchell Froom; Kevin Killen; Declan MacManus | 1991 | |
| "Human Hands" | Elvis Costello and the Attractions | Elvis Costello | Imperial Bedroom | Geoff Emerick | 1982 | |
| "Human Touch" | Elvis Costello and the Attractions | Elvis Costello | Get Happy!! | Nick Lowe | 1980 | |
| "Hurry Down Doomsday (The Bugs Are Taking Over)" | Elvis Costello | Declan MacManus; Jim Keltner | Mighty Like a Rose | Mitchell Froom; Kevin Killen; Declan MacManus | 1991 | |
| "I Can't Stand Up for Falling Down" (Sam & Dave cover) | Elvis Costello and the Attractions | Homer Banks; Allen Jones † | Get Happy!! | Nick Lowe | 1980 | |
| "(I Don't Want to Go to) Chelsea" | Elvis Costello and the Attractions | Elvis Costello | This Year's Model | Nick Lowe | 1978 | |
| "I Can't Say Her Name" | Elvis Costello | Elvis Costello | Hey Clockface | Elvis Costello; Sebastian Krys; Michael Leonhart | 2020 | |
| "I Can't Turn It Off" | D.P. Costello | D.P. Costello | Unfaithful Music & Soundtrack Album | – | 2015 | |
| "I Do (Zula's Song)" | Elvis Costello | Elvis Costello | Hey Clockface | Elvis Costello; Sebastian Krys; Michael Leonhart | 2020 | |
| "I Don't Want to Go Home" | Elvis Costello | Elvis Costello | National Ransom (National Ransack EP) | T Bone Burnett | 2010 | |
| "I Dreamed of My Old Lover" | Elvis Costello | Elvis Costello | Secret, Profane & Sugarcane | T Bone Burnett | 2009 | |
| "I Felt the Chill Before the Winter Came" | Elvis Costello | Elvis Costello; Loretta Lynn | Secret, Profane & Sugarcane | T Bone Burnett | 2009 | |
| "I Hope" (Bobby Charles cover) | Elvis Costello | Robert Charles Guidry; Stanley Lewis † | National Ransom (iTunes/Japan CD bonus track) | T Bone Burnett | 2010 | |
| "I Hope You're Happy Now" | Elvis Costello and the Attractions | Declan MacManus | Blood & Chocolate | Nick Lowe | 1986 | |
| "I Just Don't Know What to Do with Myself" (Note: Another live recording by Costello and Bacharach appears on The Songs of Bacharach & Costello (2023)) ‡ | Elvis Costello and the Attractions | Burt Bacharach; Hal David † | The Songs of Bacharach & Costello | – | 2023 | |
| "I Let the Sun Go Down" | Elvis Costello & the Imposters | Elvis Costello | Look Now | Elvis Costello; Sebastian Krys | 2018 | |
| "I Lost You" | Elvis Costello | Elvis Costello; Jim Lauderdale | National Ransom | T Bone Burnett | 2010 | |
| "I Stand Accused" (Heads Hands & Feet cover) | Elvis Costello and the Attractions | Tony Colton; Ray Smith † | Get Happy!! | Nick Lowe | 1980 | |
| "I Still Miss Someone / The Last Town I Painted" (Johnny Cash / George Jones cover) | Elvis Costello | Johnny Cash; Roy Cash, Jr. / Buddy Word † | Mighty Like a Rose (2002 reissue) | Elvis Costello | 2002 | |
| "I Threw It All Away" (Bob Dylan cover) | Elvis Costello | Bob Dylan † | Kojak Variety | Elvis Costello; Kevin Killen | 1995 | |
| "I Wanna Be Loved" (Teacher's Edition cover) | Elvis Costello and the Attractions | Farnell Jenkins † | Goodbye Cruel World | Clive Langer; Alan Winstanley | 1984 | |
| "I Want to Vanish" | Elvis Costello and the Attractions | Declan MacManus | All This Useless Beauty | Geoff Emerick; Elvis Costello | 1996 | |
| "I Want You" | Elvis Costello and the Attractions | Declan MacManus | Blood & Chocolate | Nick Lowe | 1986 | |
| "The Identity Parade" | Elvis Costello | Elvis Costello | Il Sogno | Sid McLauchlan | 2004 | |
| "Idiophone" | Elvis Costello | Declan MacManus | Brutal Youth (2002 reissue) | Elvis Costello; Kevin Killen | 2002 | |
| "If I Could Put Them All Together (I'd Have You)" ‡ (Even Stevens cover) | Elvis Costello and the Attractions | Even Stevens † | Almost Blue (2004 reissue) | Billy Sherrill | 2004 | |
| "If You Love Me" | Elvis Costello & the Imposters | Johnny Cash; Elvis Costello | Purse (EP) | Elvis Costello; Sebastian Krys | 2019 | |
| "Imagination (Is a Powerful Deceiver)" | Elvis Costello | Elvis Costello | My Aim Is True (1993 reissue) | Nick Lowe | 1993 | |
| "Impatience" | Elvis Costello | Elvis Costello | North (UK and Japan editions) | Elvis Costello; Kevin Killen | 2003 | |
| "Imperial Bedroom" | Napoleon Dynamite & The Royal Guard | Elvis Costello | B-side of "Man Out of Time"; Out of Our Idiot | Elvis Costello | 1982 | |
| "The Imposter" | Elvis Costello and the Attractions | Elvis Costello | Get Happy!! | Nick Lowe | 1980 | |
| "The Imposter vs. the Floodtide (Dust and Petals)" | Elvis Costello | Elvis Costello | B-side of "Tear Off Your Own Head (It's A Doll Revolution)"; Cruel Smile | The Imposter | 2002 | |
| "In Another Room" | Elvis Costello & the Imposters | Elvis Costello | The Delivery Man (deluxe edition) | Elvis Costello; Dennis Herring | 2004 | |
| "Inch By Inch" | Elvis Costello and the Attractions | Elvis Costello | Goodbye Cruel World | Clive Langer; Alan Winstanley | 1984 | |
| "Indoor Fireworks" | The Costello Show featuring the Attractions and the Confederates | Declan ManManus | King of America | T Bone Burnett; Declan MacManus | 1986 | |
| "Innocent When You Dream" (Tom Waits cover) | Elvis Costello | Tom Waits † | Kojak Variety (2004 reissue) | Elvis Costello; Kevin Killen | 2004 | |
| "Interlude: Couldn't Call It Unexpected No. 2" | Elvis Costello | Declan MacManus | Mighty Like a Rose | Mitchell Froom; Kevin Killen; Declan MacManus | 1991 | |
| "Invasion Hit Parade" | Elvis Costello | Declan MacManus | Mighty Like a Rose | Mitchell Froom; Kevin Killen; Declan MacManus | 1991 | |
| "The Invisible Man" | Elvis Costello and the Attractions | Elvis Costello | Punch the Clock | Clive Langer; Alan Winstanley | 1983 | |
| "Isabelle in Tears" | Elvis Costello & the Imposters | Elvis Costello | Look Now (Regarde Maintenant EP) | Elvis Costello; Sebastian Krys | 2018 | |
| "It Started to Come to Me" | Elvis Costello | Declan MacManus | Mighty Like a Rose (2002 reissue) | Elvis Costello | 2002 | |
| "It Tears Me Up" ‡ (Percy Sledge cover) | Elvis Costello & the Confederates | Dan Penn; Spooner Oldham † | King of America (1995 reissue) | Declan MacManus | 1995 | |
| "It's Time" | Elvis Costello and the Attractions | Declan MacManus | All This Useless Beauty | Geoff Emerick; Elvis Costello | 1996 | |
| "I'll Wear It Proudly" | The Costello Show featuring the Attractions and the Confederates | Declan ManManus | King of America | T Bone Burnett; Declan MacManus | 1986 | |
| "I'm Coming Home" (T Bone Burnett cover) | Elvis Costello | T Bone Burnett † | Kojak Variety (2004 reissue) | Elvis Costello; Kevin Killen | 2004 | |
| "I'm in the Mood Again" | Elvis Costello | Elvis Costello | North | Elvis Costello; Kevin Killen | 2003 | |
| "I'm Not Angry" | Elvis Costello | Elvis Costello | My Aim Is True | Nick Lowe | 1977 | |
| "I'm Your Toy" (Note: "I'm Your Toy" was originally recorded by the Flying Burrito Brothers as "Hot Burrito No. 1" (on their 1969 album The Gilded Palace of Sin).) (Gram Parsons cover) | Elvis Costello and the Attractions | Gram Parsons; Chris Ethridge † | Almost Blue | Billy Sherrill | 1981 | |
| "I've Been Wrong Before" (Cilla Black cover) | Elvis Costello | Randy Newman † | Kojak Variety | Elvis Costello; Kevin Killen | 1995 | |
| "Jack of All Parades" | The Costello Show featuring the Attractions and the Confederates | Declan ManManus | King of America | T Bone Burnett; Declan MacManus | 1986 | |
| "The Jealousy of Helena" | Elvis Costello | Elvis Costello | Il Sogno | Sid McLauchlan | 2004 | |
| "Jimmie Standing in the Rain" | Elvis Costello | Elvis Costello | National Ransom | T Bone Burnett | 2010 | |
| "Joe Porterhouse" | Elvis Costello and the Attractions | Elvis Costello | Goodbye Cruel World | Clive Langer; Alan Winstanley | 1984 | |
| "The Judgment" | Elvis Costello & the Imposters | Elvis Costello; Cait O'Riordan | The Delivery Man | Elvis Costello; Dennis Herring | 2004 | |
| "Jump Up" | Elvis Costello | Elvis Costello | My Aim Is True (1993 reissue) | Nick Lowe | 1993 | |
| "Just a Memory" | Elvis Costello and the Attractions | Elvis Costello | B-side of "New Amsterdam"; Taking Liberties | Nick Lowe | 1980 | |
| "Just About Glad" | Elvis Costello | Declan MacManus | Brutal Youth | Elvis Costello; Mitchell Froom | 1994 | |
| "Just Another Mystery" | Elvis Costello | Declan MacManus | Mighty Like a Rose (2002 reissue) | Elvis Costello | 2002 | |
| "Kid About It" | Elvis Costello and the Attractions | Elvis Costello | Imperial Bedroom | Geoff Emerick | 1982 | |
| "Kinder Murder" | Elvis Costello | Declan MacManus | Brutal Youth | Elvis Costello; Mitchell Froom | 1994 | |
| "King Horse" | Elvis Costello and the Attractions | Elvis Costello | Get Happy!! | Nick Lowe | 1980 | |
| "King of Confidence" | The Costello Show | Declan MacManus | King of America (1995 reissue) | T Bone Burnett; Declan MacManus; Larry Hirsch | 1995 | |
| "King of Thieves" | Elvis Costello and the Attractions | Elvis Costello | Punch the Clock | Clive Langer; Alan Winstanley | 1983 | |
| "Last Boat Leaving" | Elvis Costello | Elvis Costello | Spike | Elvis Costello; Kevin Killen; T Bone Burnett | 1989 | |
| "The Last Confession of Vivian Whip" | Elvis Costello | Elvis Costello; Steve Nieve; Muriel Téodori | Hey Clockface | Elvis Costello; Sebastian Krys; Michael Leonhart | 2020 | |
| "Leave My Kitten Alone" (Little Willie John cover) | Elvis Costello | Little Willie John; Titus Turner † | Kojak Variety | Elvis Costello; Kevin Killen | 1995 | |
| "Less than Zero" | Elvis Costello | Elvis Costello | My Aim Is True | Nick Lowe | 1977 | |
| "Let Him Dangle" | Elvis Costello | Elvis Costello | Spike | Elvis Costello; Kevin Killen; T Bone Burnett | 1989 | |
| "Let Me Tell You About Her" | Elvis Costello | Elvis Costello | North | Elvis Costello; Kevin Killen | 2003 | |
| "Let Them All Talk" | Elvis Costello and the Attractions | Elvis Costello | Punch the Clock | Clive Langer; Alan Winstanley | 1983 | |
| "Life Shrinks" | Elvis Costello and the Attractions | Declan MacManus | B-side of "It's Time" | Geoff Emerick; Elvis Costello | 1996 | |
| "Lip Service" | Elvis Costello and the Attractions | Elvis Costello | This Year's Model | Nick Lowe | 1978 | |
| "Lipstick Vogue" | Elvis Costello and the Attractions | Elvis Costello | This Year's Model | Nick Lowe | 1978 | |
| "Little Atoms" | Elvis Costello and the Attractions | Declan MacManus | All This Useless Beauty | Geoff Emerick; Elvis Costello | 1996 | |
| "Little Goody Two Shoes" | Elvis Costello and the Attractions | Elvis Costello | Out of Our Idiot | Geoff Emerick | 1987 | |
| "Little Palaces" | The Costello Show featuring the Attractions and the Confederates | Declan ManManus | King of America | T Bone Burnett; Declan MacManus | 1986 | |
| "Little Savage" | Elvis Costello and the Attractions | Elvis Costello | Imperial Bedroom | Geoff Emerick | 1982 | |
| "Little Triggers" | Elvis Costello and the Attractions | Elvis Costello | This Year's Model | Nick Lowe | 1978 | |
| "Living in Paradise" | Elvis Costello and the Attractions | Elvis Costello | This Year's Model | Nick Lowe | 1978 | |
| "London's Brilliant Parade" | Elvis Costello | Declan MacManus | Brutal Youth | Elvis Costello; Mitchell Froom | 1994 | |
| "Lonely Boy Blue" (Conway Twitty cover) | Elvis Costello | Ben Weisman; Fred Wise † | Blood & Chocolate (2002 reissue) | Nick Lowe | 2002 | |
| "The Long Honeymoon" | Elvis Costello and the Attractions | Elvis Costello | Imperial Bedroom | Geoff Emerick | 1982 | |
| "Look Up Again" | Elvis Costello | Elvis Costello; Burt Bacharach | The Songs of Bacharach & Costello | Sebastian Krys; Elvis Costello | 2023 | |
| "Lovable" | The Costello Show featuring the Attractions and the Confederates | Declan ManManus; Cait O'Riordan | King of America | T Bone Burnett; Declan MacManus | 1986 | |
| "Love Field" | Elvis Costello and the Attractions | Elvis Costello | Goodbye Cruel World | Clive Langer; Alan Winstanley | 1984 | |
| "Love for Sale" (Cole Porter cover) | Elvis Costello and the Attractions | Cole Porter † | Trust (1994 reissue) | Elvis Costello | 1994 | |
| "Love for Tender" | Elvis Costello and the Attractions | Elvis Costello | Get Happy!! | Nick Lowe | 1980 | |
| "Love Went Mad" | Elvis Costello and the Attractions | Elvis Costello | Punch the Clock | Clive Langer; Alan Winstanley | 1983 | |
| "The Loved Ones" | Elvis Costello and the Attractions | Elvis Costello | Imperial Bedroom | Geoff Emerick | 1982 | |
| "Lovers Arise" | Elvis Costello | Elvis Costello | Il Sogno | Sid McLauchlan | 2004 | |
| "The Lovers That Never Were" (First released by Paul McCartney in 1993) | Elvis Costello & the Imposters | Paul McCartney; Elvis Costello | Purse (EP) | Elvis Costello; Sebastian Krys | 2019 | |
| "Lovers Walk" | Elvis Costello and the Attractions | Elvis Costello | Trust | Nick Lowe; Roger Béchirian | 1981 | |
| "Luxembourg" | Elvis Costello and the Attractions | Elvis Costello | Trust | Nick Lowe; Roger Béchirian | 1981 | |
| "Magnificent Hurt" | Elvis Costello and the Imposters | Elvis Costello | The Boy Named If | Elvis Costello; Sebastian Krys | 2022 | |
| "Man Out of Time" | Elvis Costello and the Attractions | Elvis Costello | Imperial Bedroom | Geoff Emerick | 1982 | |
| "The Man You Love to Hate" | Elvis Costello and the Imposters | Elvis Costello | The Boy Named If | Elvis Costello; Sebastian Krys | 2022 | |
| "Men Called Uncle" | Elvis Costello and the Attractions | Elvis Costello | Get Happy!! | Nick Lowe | 1980 | |
| "Miracle Man" | Elvis Costello | Elvis Costello | My Aim Is True | Nick Lowe | 1977 | |
| "Mischievous Ghost" | Elvis Costello | Declan MacManus | Mighty Like a Rose (2002 reissue) | Elvis Costello | 2002 | |
| "Miss Macbeth" | Elvis Costello | Elvis Costello | Spike | Elvis Costello; Kevin Killen; T Bone Burnett | 1989 | |
| "Mistook Me for a Friend" | Elvis Costello and the Imposters | Elvis Costello | The Boy Named If | Elvis Costello; Sebastian Krys | 2022 | |
| "Mistress and Maid" | Elvis Costello | Declan MacManus; Paul McCartney | All This Useless Beauty (2001 reissue) | Elvis Costello | 2001 | |
| "Moods for Moderns" | Elvis Costello and the Attractions | Elvis Costello | Armed Forces | Nick Lowe | 1979 | |
| "The Monkey" (Dave Bartholomew cover) | Elvis Costello & the Imposters | Dave Bartholomew; Pearl King † | The Delivery Man (deluxe edition) | Elvis Costello; Dennis Herring | 2004 | |
| "Monkey to Man" | Elvis Costello & the Imposters | Elvis Costello | The Delivery Man | Elvis Costello; Dennis Herring | 2004 | |
| "Motel Matches" | Elvis Costello and the Attractions | Elvis Costello | Get Happy!! | Nick Lowe | 1980 | |
| "Mouth Almighty" | Elvis Costello and the Attractions | Elvis Costello | Punch the Clock | Clive Langer; Alan Winstanley | 1983 | |
| "Mr. and Mrs. Hush" | Elvis Costello & the Imposters | Elvis Costello | Look Now | Elvis Costello; Sebastian Krys | 2018 | |
| "Mr. Crescent" | Elvis Costello and the Imposters | Elvis Costello | The Boy Named If | Elvis Costello; Sebastian Krys | 2022 | |
| "Mr. Feathers" | Elvis Costello and the Imposters | Elvis Costello | Momofuku | Elvis Costello; Jason Lader | 2008 | |
| "Must You Throw Dirt in My Face" (The Louvin Brothers cover) | Elvis Costello | Bill Anderson † | Kojak Variety | Elvis Costello; Kevin Killen | 1995 | |
| "Mystery Dance" | Elvis Costello | Elvis Costello | My Aim Is True | Nick Lowe | 1977 | |
| "Mystery Voice" (Note: Evolved into "Room With No Number") | Elvis Costello | Elvis Costello | Goodbye Cruel World (2004 reissue) | Elvis Costello | 2004 | |
| "My All Time Doll" | Elvis Costello | Elvis Costello | Secret, Profane & Sugarcane | T Bone Burnett | 2009 | |
| "My Funny Valentine" | Elvis Costello and the Attractions | Richard Rodgers; Lorenz Hart † | B-side of "Oliver's Army"; Taking Liberties | Nick Lowe | 1979 | |
| "My Little Blue Window" | Elvis Costello | Elvis Costello | When I Was Cruel | The Imposter | 2002 | |
| "My Lovely Jezebel" | Elvis Costello | Elvis Costello; T Bone Burnett; Leon Russell | National Ransom | T Bone Burnett | 2010 | |
| "My Mood Swings" | Elvis Costello | Elvis Costello; Cait O'Riordan | The Big Lebowski (Original Motion Picture Soundtrack) | T Bone Burnett; Joel Coen; Ethan Coen | 1998 | |
| "My Most Beautiful Mistake" | Elvis Costello and the Imposters | Elvis Costello | The Boy Named If | Elvis Costello; Sebastian Krys | 2022 | |
| "My Resistance Is Low" (Hoagy Carmichael cover) | Elvis Costello | Harold Adamson; Hoagy Carmichael † | Kojak Variety (2004 reissue) | Elvis Costello; Kevin Killen | 2004 | |
| "My Science Fiction Twin" | Elvis Costello | Declan MacManus | Brutal Youth | Elvis Costello; Mitchell Froom | 1994 | |
| "My Shoes Keep Walking Back to You" ‡ (Ray Price cover) | Elvis Costello and the Attractions | Bob Wills; Lee Ross † | Almost Blue (1994 reissue) | Billy Sherrill | 1994 | |
| "My Three Sons" | Elvis Costello and the Imposters | Elvis Costello | Momofuku | Elvis Costello; Jason Lader | 2008 | |
| "The Name of This Thing Is Not Love" | Elvis Costello & the Imposters | Elvis Costello | The Delivery Man | Elvis Costello; Dennis Herring | 2004 | |
| "National Ransom" | Elvis Costello | Elvis Costello | National Ransom | T Bone Burnett | 2010 | |
| "Neat Neat Neat" ‡ | Elvis Costello and the Attractions | Elvis Costello | This Year's Model (2002 reissue) | Tony Wilson | 2002 | |
| "Needle Time" | Elvis Costello & the Imposters | Elvis Costello | The Delivery Man | Elvis Costello; Dennis Herring | 2004 | |
| "New Amsterdam" | Elvis Costello and the Attractions | Elvis Costello | Get Happy!! | Nick Lowe | 1980 | |
| "New Lace Sleeves" | Elvis Costello and the Attractions | Elvis Costello | Trust | Nick Lowe; Roger Béchirian | 1981 | |
| "New Rhythm Method" | Elvis Costello and the Attractions | Declan MacManus | Blood & Chocolate (2002 reissue) | Nick Lowe | 2002 | |
| "Newspaper Pane" | Elvis Costello | Elvis Costello; Michael Leonhart; Bill Frisell | Hey Clockface | Elvis Costello; Sebastian Krys; Michael Leonhart | 2020 | |
| "Next Time Round" | Elvis Costello and the Attractions | Declan MacManus | Blood & Chocolate | Nick Lowe | 1986 | |
| "The Night Before Larry Was Stretched" (Johnny Moynihan cover) | Elvis Costello | Traditional † | Kojak Variety (2004 reissue) | Elvis Costello; Kevin Killen | 2004 | |
| "Night Time" (The Escorts cover) | Elvis Costello and the Attractions | Patrick Chambers † | B-side of "Everyday I Write the Book" (12"); Imperial Bedroom (1994 reissue) | Elvis Costello | 1994 | |
| "Night Rally" | Elvis Costello and the Attractions | Elvis Costello | This Year's Model | Nick Lowe | 1978 | |
| "No Action" | Elvis Costello and the Attractions | Elvis Costello | This Year's Model | Nick Lowe | 1978 | |
| "No Dancing" | Elvis Costello | Elvis Costello | My Aim Is True | Nick Lowe | 1977 | |
| "No Hiding Place" | Elvis Costello and the Imposters | Elvis Costello | Momofuku | Elvis Costello; Jason Lader | 2008 | |
| "No Flag" | Elvis Costello | Elvis Costello | Hey Clockface | Elvis Costello; Sebastian Krys; Michael Leonhart | 2020 | |
| "Nothing Clings Like Ivy" | Elvis Costello & the Imposters | Elvis Costello | The Delivery Man | Elvis Costello; Dennis Herring | 2004 | |
| "Oberon and Titania" | Elvis Costello | Elvis Costello | Il Sogno | Sid McLauchlan | 2004 | |
| "Oberon Humbled" | Elvis Costello | Elvis Costello | Il Sogno | Sid McLauchlan | 2004 | |
| "Oh Well" | Elvis Costello | Elvis Costello; K "Q-Tip" Fareed | When I Was Cruel (UK & Japan editions) | The Imposter | 2002 | |
| "Oliver's Army" | Elvis Costello and the Attractions | Elvis Costello | Armed Forces | Nick Lowe | 1979 | |
| "One Bell Ringing" | Elvis Costello | Elvis Costello | National Ransom | T Bone Burnett | 2010 | |
| "The Only Daddy That'll Walk The Line" ‡ (Waylon Jennings cover) | Elvis Costello & the Confederates | Ivy Bryant † | King of America (1995 reissue) | Declan MacManus | 1995 | |
| "The Only Flame in Town" | Elvis Costello and the Attractions | Elvis Costello | Goodbye Cruel World | Clive Langer; Alan Winstanley | 1984 | |
| "Opportunity" | Elvis Costello and the Attractions | Elvis Costello | Get Happy!! | Nick Lowe | 1980 | |
| "The Other End of the Telescope" (First released by 'Til Tuesday in 1988) | Elvis Costello and the Attractions | Aimee Mann; Declan MacManus | All This Useless Beauty | Geoff Emerick; Elvis Costello | 1996 | |
| "The Other Side of Summer" | Elvis Costello | Declan MacManus | Mighty Like a Rose | Mitchell Froom; Kevin Killen; Declan MacManus | 1991 | |
| "Our Little Angel" | The Costello Show featuring the Attractions and the Confederates | Declan ManManus | King of America | T Bone Burnett; Declan MacManus | 1986 | |
| "Overture" | Elvis Costello | Elvis Costello | Il Sogno | Sid McLauchlan | 2004 | |
| "Pads, Paws and Claws" | Elvis Costello | Elvis Costello; Paul McCartney | Spike | Elvis Costello; Kevin Killen; T Bone Burnett | 1989 | |
| "Paint the Red Rose Blue" | Elvis Costello and the Imposters | Elvis Costello | The Boy Named If | Elvis Costello; Sebastian Krys | 2022 | |
| "Pardon Me, Madam, My Name Is Eve" | Elvis Costello and the Imposters | Elvis Costello; Loretta Lynn | Momofuku | Elvis Costello; Jason Lader | 2008 | |
| "Party Girl" | Elvis Costello and the Attractions | Elvis Costello | Armed Forces | Nick Lowe | 1979 | |
| "Party Party" | Elvis Costello and the Attractions | Elvis Costello | Party Party (Original Motion Picture Soundtrack) | Elvis Costello; Colin Fairley | 1982 | |
| "Pay It Back" | Elvis Costello | Elvis Costello | My Aim Is True | Nick Lowe | 1977 | |
| "Payday" (Jesse Winchester cover) | Elvis Costello | Jesse Winchester † | Kojak Variety | Elvis Costello; Kevin Killen | 1995 | |
| "Peace in Our Time" | Elvis Costello and the Attractions | Elvis Costello | Goodbye Cruel World | Clive Langer; Alan Winstanley | 1984 | |
| "Penelope Halfpenny" | Elvis Costello and the Imposters | Elvis Costello | The Boy Named If | Elvis Costello; Sebastian Krys | 2022 | |
| "Peroxide Side (Blunt Cut)" | Elvis Costello | Elvis Costello | B-side of "45"; Cruel Smile | The Imposter | 2002 | |
| "Photographic Memory" | Elvis Costello | Elvis Costello | Hey Clockface (Japan CD) | Elvis Costello; Sebastian Krys; Michael Leonhart | 2020 | |
| "Photographs Can Lie" | Elvis Costello & the Imposters | Burt Bacharach; Elvis Costello | Look Now | Elvis Costello; Sebastian Krys | 2018 | |
| "Pidgin English" | Elvis Costello and the Attractions | Elvis Costello | Imperial Bedroom | Geoff Emerick | 1982 | |
| "Pills and Soap" | Elvis Costello and the Attractions | Elvis Costello | Punch the Clock | Clive Langer; Alan Winstanley | 1983 | |
| "The Play" | Elvis Costello | Elvis Costello | Il Sogno | Sid McLauchlan | 2004 | |
| "Playboy to a Man" | Elvis Costello | Declan MacManus; Paul McCartney | Mighty Like a Rose | Mitchell Froom; Kevin Killen; Declan MacManus | 1991 | |
| "Please Stay" (The Drifters cover) | Elvis Costello | Burt Bacharach; Bob Hilliard † | Kojak Variety | Elvis Costello; Kevin Killen | 1995 | |
| "Point of No Return" (Gene McDaniels cover) | Elvis Costello | Gerry Goffin; Carole King † | Spike (2001 reissue) | Elvis Costello; Colin Fairley | 2001 | |
| "Poison Moon" | Elvis Costello | Elvis Costello | My Aim Is True (1993 reissue) | Nick Lowe | 1993 | |
| "Poisoned Letter" | Elvis Costello | Declan MacManus | Brutal Youth (2002 reissue) | Elvis Costello | 2002 | |
| "Poisoned Rose" | The Costello Show featuring the Attractions and the Confederates | Declan ManManus | King of America | T Bone Burnett; Declan MacManus | 1986 | |
| "Pony St." | Elvis Costello | Declan MacManus | Brutal Youth | Elvis Costello; Mitchell Froom | 1994 | |
| "Poor Borrowed Dress" | Elvis Costello | Elvis Costello; Jim Lauderdale | National Ransom (National Ransack EP) | T Bone Burnett | 2010 | |
| "Poor Fracture Atlas" | Elvis Costello and the Attractions | Declan MacManus | All This Useless Beauty | Geoff Emerick; Elvis Costello | 1996 | |
| "Poor Napoleon" | Elvis Costello and the Attractions | Declan MacManus | Blood & Chocolate | Nick Lowe | 1986 | |
| "Pop Life" (Prince cover) | Elvis Costello | Prince † | – (Note: Costello recorded a cover of "Pop Life", intended for release on Extreme Honey (1997), but was denied Prince's permission to release it. Costello released the original "The Bridge I Burned" on the compilation instead.) | Unreleased | – | |
| "Possession" | Elvis Costello and the Attractions | Elvis Costello | Get Happy!! | Nick Lowe | 1980 | |
| "Pouring Water on a Drowning Man" (Note: An earlier version appears on the 2002 reissue of Blood & Chocolate) (James Carr cover) | Elvis Costello | Drew Baker; Dani McCormick † | Kojak Variety | Elvis Costello; Kevin Killen | 1995 | |
| "Prelude" | Elvis Costello | Elvis Costello | Il Sogno | Sid McLauchlan | 2004 | |
| "Pretty Words" | Elvis Costello and the Attractions | Elvis Costello | Trust | Nick Lowe; Roger Béchirian | 1981 | |
| "Psycho" ‡ (Leon Payne cover) | Elvis Costello and the Attractions | Leon Payne † | Almost Blue (1994 reissue) | Billy Sherrill | 1994 | |
| "Puck 1" | Elvis Costello | Elvis Costello | Il Sogno | Sid McLauchlan | 2004 | |
| "Puck 2" | Elvis Costello | Elvis Costello | Il Sogno | Sid McLauchlan | 2004 | |
| "Pump It Up" | Elvis Costello and the Attractions | Elvis Costello | This Year's Model | Nick Lowe | 1978 | |
| "Puppet Girl" (First recorded by Wendy James in 1993) | Elvis Costello | Declan MacManus; Cait O'Riordan | "13 Steps Lead Down" EP | Mitchell Froom; Elvis Costello | 1994 | |
| "Put Your Big Toe in the Milk of Human Kindness" (Note: Properly recorded with Rob Wasserman and Marc Ribot for Wasserman's album Trios.) | Elvis Costello | Declan MacManus | Spike (2001 reissue) | Elvis Costello | 2001 | |
| "Radio Is Everything" | Elvis Costello | Elvis Costello; Michael Leonhart; Bill Frisell; Nels Cline | Hey Clockface | Elvis Costello; Sebastian Krys; Michael Leonhart | 2020 | |
| "Radio Radio" | Elvis Costello and the Attractions | Elvis Costello | Non-album single (UK); This Year's Model (US edition) (Note: The 2002 reissue of This Year's Model added "Radio Radio" as the final track after "Night Rally".) | Nick Lowe | 1978 | |
| "Radio Silence" | Elvis Costello | Elvis Costello | When I Was Cruel | The Imposter | 2002 | |
| "Radio Sweetheart" | Elvis Costello and the Attractions | Elvis Costello | B-side of "Less than Zero"; Taking Liberties | Nick Lowe | 1977 | |
| "Really Mystified" (The Merseybeats cover) | Elvis Costello and the Attractions | Tony Crane; John Gustafson † | Imperial Bedroom (1994 reissue) | Elvis Costello | 1994 | |
| "Red Cotton" | Elvis Costello | Elvis Costello | Secret, Profane & Sugarcane | T Bone Burnett | 2009 | |
| "Remove This Doubt" (The Supremes cover) | Elvis Costello | Brian Holland; Lamont Dozier; Edward Holland, Jr. † | Kojak Variety | Elvis Costello; Kevin Killen | 1995 | |
| "Revolution #49" | Elvis Costello | Elvis Costello | Hey Clockface | Elvis Costello; Sebastian Krys; Michael Leonhart | 2020 | |
| "Revolution Doll" | Elvis Costello | Elvis Costello | B-side of "Tear Off Your Own Head (It's A Doll Revolution)"; Cruel Smile | The Imposter | 2002 | |
| "Riot Act" | Elvis Costello and the Attractions | Elvis Costello | Get Happy!! | Nick Lowe | 1980 | |
| "Roadette Song" ‡ | Elvis Costello and the Attractions | Elvis Costello | This Year's Model (2002 reissue) | Tony Wilson | 2002 | |
| "Rocking Horse Road" | Elvis Costello | Declan MacManus | Brutal Youth | Elvis Costello; Mitchell Froom | 1994 | |
| "The Room Nobody Lives In" (John Sebastian cover) | Elvis Costello | John Sebastian † | B-side of "Veronica" (12") | Elvis Costello; Kevin Killen; T Bone Burnett | 1989 | |
| "Room with No Number" | Elvis Costello and the Attractions | Elvis Costello | Goodbye Cruel World | Clive Langer; Alan Winstanley | 1984 | |
| "Running Out of Angels" | Elvis Costello | Elvis Costello | This Year's Model (1993 reissue) | Tony Wilson | 1993 | |
| "Running Out of Fools" (Aretha Franklin cover) | Elvis Costello | Richard Ahlert; Kay Rogers † | Kojak Variety | Elvis Costello; Kevin Killen | 1995 | |
| "Sad About Girls" (Note: Originally appeared on the Attractions' album Mad About the Wrong Boy.) | Elvis Costello and the Attractions | Fay Hart; Norman Brain † | Trust (1994 reissue) | Elvis Costello | 1994 | |
| "Sally Sue Brown" (Arthur Alexander cover) | Elvis Costello | Arthur Alexander † | Kojak Variety (2004 reissue) | Elvis Costello; Kevin Killen | 2004 | |
| "Satellite" | Elvis Costello | Elvis Costello | Spike | Elvis Costello; Kevin Killen; T Bone Burnett | 1989 | |
| "The Scarlet Tide" | Elvis Costello & the Imposters | Elvis Costello; T Bone Burnett | The Delivery Man | Elvis Costello; Dennis Herring | 2004 | |
| "Secondary Modern" | Elvis Costello and the Attractions | Elvis Costello | Get Happy!! | Nick Lowe | 1980 | |
| "Seconds of Pleasure" | Elvis Costello and the Attractions | Elvis Costello | Trust (1994 reissue) | Elvis Costello | 1994 | |
| "Senior Service" | Elvis Costello and the Attractions | Elvis Costello | Armed Forces | Nick Lowe | 1979 | |
| "Seven O'Clock" | Elvis Costello and the Attractions | Elvis Costello | Get Happy!! (2003 reissue) | Elvis Costello | 2003 | |
| "Shabby Doll" | Elvis Costello and the Attractions | Elvis Costello | Imperial Bedroom | Geoff Emerick | 1982 | |
| "Shallow Grave" | Elvis Costello and the Attractions | Declan MacManus; Paul McCartney | All This Useless Beauty | Geoff Emerick; Elvis Costello | 1996 | |
| "Shatterproof" | Elvis Costello and the Attractions | Elvis Costello | Punch the Clock (1995 reissue) | Elvis Costello | 1995 | |
| "She" (Charles Aznavour cover) | Elvis Costello | Charles Aznavour; Herbert Kretzmer † | Notting Hill (soundtrack) | Trevor Jones | 1999 | |
| "She Handed Me a Mirror" | Elvis Costello | Elvis Costello | Secret, Profane & Sugarcane | T Bone Burnett | 2009 | |
| "She Loves the Jerk" | Elvis Costello and the Attractions | Elvis Costello | Goodbye Cruel World (2004 reissue) | Elvis Costello | 2004 | |
| "She Was No Good" | Elvis Costello | Elvis Costello | Secret, Profane & Sugarcane | T Bone Burnett | 2009 | |
| "She's Pulling Out the Pin" | Elvis Costello & the Imposters | Elvis Costello; T Bone Burnett | The Delivery Man (LP, UK CD, and deluxe editions) | Elvis Costello; Dennis Herring | 2004 | |
| "Ship of Fools" (Grateful Dead cover) | Elvis Costello | Jerry Garcia; Robert Hunter † | Kojak Variety (2004 reissue) | Elvis Costello; Kevin Killen | 2004 | |
| "Shipbuilding" (First released by Robert Wyatt in 1982) | Elvis Costello and the Attractions | Clive Langer; Elvis Costello | Punch the Clock | Clive Langer; Alan Winstanley | 1983 | |
| "Shoes Without Heels" | Elvis Costello & the Confederates | Declan MacManus | B-side of "Blue Chair" (12"); Out of Our Idiot | T Bone Burnett; Larry Hirsch | 1986 | |
| "Shot With His Own Gun" | Elvis Costello and the Attractions | Elvis Costello | Trust | Nick Lowe; Roger Béchirian | 1981 | |
| "Sittin' and Thinkin'" (Charlie Rich cover) | Elvis Costello and the Attractions | Charlie Rich † | Almost Blue | Billy Sherrill | 1981 | |
| "Sleep" | Elvis Costello | Elvis Costello | Il Sogno | Sid McLauchlan | 2004 | |
| "Sleep of the Just" | The Costello Show featuring the Attractions and the Confederates | Declan ManManus | King of America | T Bone Burnett; Declan MacManus | 1986 | |
| "Sleepless Nights" (Note: A studio recording appears on the 2004 reissue of Kojak Variety.) ‡ (The Everly Brothers cover) | Elvis Costello and the Attractions | Felice and Boudleaux Bryant † | Goodbye Cruel World (1995 reissue) | Elvis Costello | 1995 | |
| "Slow Down" (Larry Williams cover) | Elvis Costello and the Attractions | Larry Williams † | Trust (2003 reissue) | Elvis Costello | 2003 | |
| "A Slow Drag with Josephine" | Elvis Costello | Elvis Costello | National Ransom | T Bone Burnett | 2010 | |
| "Slumber" | Elvis Costello | Elvis Costello | Il Sogno | Sid McLauchlan | 2004 | |
| "Smile" (Charlie Chaplin cover) | Elvis Costello | Charlie Chaplin; Geoff Parsons; John Turner † | Japan-only single Cruel Smile | Elvis Costello; Kevin Killen | 2002 | |
| "Smile 2" | Elvis Costello | Elvis Costello | When I Was Cruel (Collectors Edition) | The Imposter | 2002 | |
| "Sneaky Feelings" | Elvis Costello | Elvis Costello | My Aim Is True | Nick Lowe | 1977 | |
| "Sour Milk Cow Blues" | Elvis Costello and the Attractions | Elvis Costello | Goodbye Cruel World | Clive Langer; Alan Winstanley | 1984 | |
| "So Like Candy" | Elvis Costello | Declan MacManus; Paul McCartney | Mighty Like a Rose | Mitchell Froom; Kevin Killen; Declan MacManus | 1991 | |
| "So Young" (Jo Jo Zep & the Falcons cover) | Elvis Costello and the Attractions | Joe Camilleri; Jeff Burstin; Tony Faehse † | Out of Our Idiot | Geoff Emerick | 1987 | |
| "Someone Took the Words Away" | Elvis Costello | Elvis Costello | North | Elvis Costello; Kevin Killen | 2003 | |
| "Song with Rose" | Elvis Costello and the Imposters | Elvis Costello; Rosanne Cash | Momofuku | Elvis Costello; Jason Lader | 2008 | |
| "Soul for Hire" | Elvis Costello | Elvis Costello | When I Was Cruel | The Imposter | 2002 | |
| "The Spark of Love" | Elvis Costello | Elvis Costello | Il Sogno | Sid McLauchlan | 2004 | |
| "Sparkling Day" | Elvis Costello | Elvis Costello | One Day (Original Motion Picture Soundtrack) | – | 2011 | |
| "The Spell That You Cast" | Elvis Costello | Elvis Costello | National Ransom | T Bone Burnett | 2010 | |
| "Spooky Girlfriend" | Elvis Costello | Elvis Costello | When I Was Cruel | The Imposter | 2002 | |
| "Stand Down, Margaret" (Note: Performed in a medley with "Big Sister's Clothes") (The Beat cover) | Elvis Costello and the Attractions | Roger Chalery; Andy Cox; Everett Morton; David Steele; Dave Wakeling † | Punch the Clock (2003 reissue) | Elvis Costello | 2003 | |
| "Stalin Malone" | Elvis Costello | Elvis Costello | Spike | Elvis Costello; Kevin Killen; T Bone Burnett | 1989 | |
| "The Stamping Ground" | Elvis Costello and the Attractions | Elvis Costello | B-side of "You Little Fool"; Out of Our Idiot | Nick Lowe | 1982 | |
| "Starting to Come to Me" | Elvis Costello and the Attractions | Declan MacManus | All This Useless Beauty | Geoff Emerick; Elvis Costello | 1996 | |
| "The State of Affairs" | Elvis Costello | Elvis Costello | Il Sogno | Sid McLauchlan | 2004 | |
| "Stations of the Cross" | Elvis Costello | Elvis Costello | National Ransom | T Bone Burnett | 2010 | |
| "Stella Hurt" | Elvis Costello and the Imposters | Elvis Costello | Momofuku | Elvis Costello; Jason Lader | 2008 | |
| "Step Inside Love" (Cilla Black cover) | Elvis Costello | John Lennon; Paul McCartney † | Kojak Variety (2004 reissue) | Elvis Costello; Kevin Killen | 2004 | |
| "Sticks and Stones" (Ray Charles cover) | Elvis Costello | Titus Turner † | Kojak Variety (2004 reissue) | Elvis Costello; Kevin Killen | 2004 | |
| "Still" | Elvis Costello | Elvis Costello | North | Elvis Costello; Kevin Killen | 2003 | |
| "Still Feeling Blue" (Gram Parsons cover) | Elvis Costello | Gram Parsons † | Kojak Variety (2004 reissue) | Elvis Costello; Kevin Killen | 2004 | |
| "Still Too Soon to Know" | Elvis Costello | Declan MacManus | Brutal Youth | Elvis Costello; Mitchell Froom | 1994 | |
| "Strange" (Screamin' Jay Hawkins cover) | Elvis Costello | Screamin' Jay Hawkins † | Kojak Variety | Elvis Costello; Kevin Killen | 1995 | |
| "Strict Time" | Elvis Costello and the Attractions | Elvis Costello | Trust | Nick Lowe; Roger Béchirian | 1981 | |
| "Stripping Paper" | Elvis Costello & the Imposters | Elvis Costello | Look Now | Elvis Costello; Sebastian Krys | 2018 | |
| "St. Steven's Day Murders" | Elvis Costello | Declan MacManus; Paddy Moloney | Mighty Like a Rose (2002 reissue) | Elvis Costello | 2002 | |
| "Success" (Loretta Lynn cover) | Elvis Costello and the Attractions | Johnny Mullins † | Almost Blue | Billy Sherrill | 1981 | |
| "Suffering Face" | The Costello Show | Declan MacManus | King of America (1995 reissue) | T Bone Burnett; Declan MacManus; Larry Hirsch | 1995 | |
| "Suit of Lights" | The Costello Show featuring the Attractions and the Confederates | Declan ManManus | King of America | T Bone Burnett; Declan MacManus | 1986 | |
| "Sulky Girl" | Elvis Costello | Declan MacManus | Brutal Youth | Elvis Costello; Mitchell Froom | 1994 | |
| "Sulphur to Sugarcane" | Elvis Costello | Elvis Costello; T Bone Burnett | Secret, Profane & Sugarcane | T Bone Burnett | 2009 | |
| "Sunday's Best" | Elvis Costello and the Attractions | Elvis Costello | Armed Forces | Nick Lowe | 1979 | |
| "Suspect My Tears" | Elvis Costello & the Imposters | Elvis Costello | Look Now | Elvis Costello; Sebastian Krys | 2018 | |
| "Sweet Dreams" (Don Gibson cover) | Elvis Costello and the Attractions | Don Gibson † | Almost Blue | Billy Sherrill | 1981 | |
| "Sweet Pear" | Elvis Costello | Declan MacManus; Paul McCartney | Mighty Like a Rose | Mitchell Froom; Kevin Killen; Declan MacManus | 1991 | |
| "Taken from Life" | Elvis Costello & the Imposters | Elvis Costello; Burt Bacharach | The Songs of Bacharach & Costello | Sebastian Krys; Elvis Costello | 2023 | |
| "Talking in the Dark" | Elvis Costello and the Attractions | Elvis Costello | Non-album single Taking Liberties | Nick Lowe | 1978 | |
| "Tart" | Elvis Costello | Elvis Costello | When I Was Cruel | The Imposter | 2002 | |
| "Tear Off Your Own Head (It's a Doll Revolution)" | Elvis Costello | Elvis Costello | When I Was Cruel | The Imposter | 2002 | |
| "Tears Before Bedtime" | Elvis Costello and the Attractions | Elvis Costello | Imperial Bedroom | Geoff Emerick | 1982 | |
| "Tell Me Right Now" (Joe Tex cover) | Elvis Costello | Joe Tex † | Blood & Chocolate (2002 reissue) | Nick Lowe | 2002 | |
| "Temptation" | Elvis Costello and the Attractions | Elvis Costello | Get Happy!! | Nick Lowe | 1980 | |
| "That's How You Got Killed Before" (Note: A live recording with the Confederates appears on the 2005 reissue of King of America) (with the Dirty Dozen Brass Band) (Dave Bartholomew and His Orchestra cover) | Elvis Costello | Dave Bartholomew † | Kojak Variety (2004 reissue) | Elvis Costello; Kevin Killen | 2004 | |
| "That's Not the Part of Him You're Leaving" | Elvis Costello | Elvis Costello | National Ransom | T Bone Burnett | 2010 | |
| "That's Why I'm Walking" ‡ (Sonny Terry and Brownie McGhee cover) | Elvis Costello and the Attractions | Sonny Terry; Brownie McGhee † | Almost Blue (2004 reissue) | Billy Sherrill | 2004 | |
| "There Won't Be Anymore" ‡ (Charlie Rich cover) | Elvis Costello and the Attractions | Charlie Rich † | Almost Blue (1994 reissue) | Billy Sherrill | 1994 | |
| "There's a Story in Your Voice" | Elvis Costello & the Imposters | Elvis Costello | The Delivery Man | Elvis Costello; Dennis Herring | 2004 | |
| "They'll Never Take Her Love from Me" (Hank Williams cover) | The Costello Show | Leon Payne † | King of America (1995 reissue) | The Coward Brothers | 1995 | |
| "They're Not Laughing at Me Now" | Elvis Costello | Elvis Costello | Hey Clockface | Elvis Costello; Sebastian Krys; Michael Leonhart | 2020 | |
| "This Is Hell" | Elvis Costello | Declan MacManus | Brutal Youth | Elvis Costello; Mitchell Froom | 1994 | |
| "...This Town..." | Elvis Costello | Elvis Costello | Spike | Elvis Costello; Kevin Killen; T Bone Burnett | 1989 | |
| "This Year's Girl" | Elvis Costello and the Attractions | Elvis Costello | This Year's Model | Nick Lowe | 1978 | |
| "Tiny Steps" | Elvis Costello and the Attractions | Elvis Costello | B-side of "Radio Radio"; Taking Liberties | Nick Lowe | 1978 | |
| "T.K.O. (Boxing Day)" | Elvis Costello and the Attractions | Elvis Costello | Punch the Clock | Clive Langer; Alan Winstanley | 1983 | |
| "Tokyo Storm Warning" | Elvis Costello and the Attractions | Declan MacManus; Cait O'Riordan | Blood & Chocolate | Nick Lowe | 1986 | |
| "Tonight the Bottle Let Me Down" (Merle Haggard and the Strangers cover) | Elvis Costello and the Attractions | Merle Haggard † | Almost Blue | Billy Sherrill | 1981 | |
| "Too Blue" | Elvis Costello | Elvis Costello | North (Japan edition) | Elvis Costello; Kevin Killen | 2003 | |
| "Too Far Gone" (Billy Sherrill cover) | Elvis Costello and the Attractions | Billy Sherrill † | Almost Blue | Billy Sherrill | 1981 | |
| "Tormentress" | Elvis Costello | Elvis Costello | Il Sogno | Sid McLauchlan | 2004 | |
| "A Town Called Big Nothing (Really Big Nothing)" | The MacManus Gang (featuring the voice of Sy Richardson) | Declan MacManus | Non-album single Out of Our Idiot | Declan MacManus | 1987 | |
| "Town Cryer" | Elvis Costello and the Attractions | Elvis Costello | Imperial Bedroom | Geoff Emerick | 1982 | |
| "The Town Where Time Stood Still" | Elvis Costello and the Attractions | Elvis Costello | Punch the Clock (1995 reissue) | Elvis Costello | 1995 | |
| "Tramp the Dirt Down" | Elvis Costello | Elvis Costello | Spike | Elvis Costello; Kevin Killen; T Bone Burnett | 1989 | |
| "Trick Out the Truth" | Elvis Costello and the Imposters | Elvis Costello | The Boy Named If | Elvis Costello; Sebastian Krys | 2022 | |
| "True Love Ways" ‡ (Buddy Holly cover) | The Costello Show featuring the Confederates | Norman Petty † | King of America (2005 reissue) | Declan MacManus | 2005 | |
| "Truth Drug" (Nick Lowe cover) | Elvis Costello and the Imposters | Nick Lowe † | The Boy Named If (Japan CD) | Elvis Costello; Sebastian Krys | 2022 | |
| "Turning the Town Red" | Elvis Costello and the Attractions | Elvis Costello | B-side of "I Wanna Be Loved"; Out of Our Idiot | Clive Langer; Alan Winstanley | 1984 | |
| "Turpentine" | Elvis Costello and the Imposters | Elvis Costello | Momofuku | Elvis Costello; Jason Lader | 2008 | |
| "Twenty-Five to Twelve" | Elvis Costello and the Attractions | Elvis Costello | Trust (1994 reissue) | Elvis Costello | 1994 | |
| "Twisted – Entangled – Transform and Exchange" | Elvis Costello | Elvis Costello | Il Sogno | Sid McLauchlan | 2004 | |
| "Two Little Hitlers" | Elvis Costello and the Attractions | Elvis Costello | Armed Forces | Nick Lowe | 1979 | |
| "The Ugly Things" (Nick Lowe cover) | Elvis Costello | Nick Lowe † | B-side of "The Other Side of Summer" (12"/CD) | Mitchell Froom; Kevin Killen; Declan MacManus | 1991 | |
| "Uncomplicated" | Elvis Costello and the Attractions | Declan MacManus | Blood & Chocolate | Nick Lowe | 1986 | |
| "Under Lime" | Elvis Costello & the Imposters | Elvis Costello | Look Now | Elvis Costello; Sebastian Krys | 2018 | |
| "Unwanted Number" | Elvis Costello & the Imposters | Elvis Costello | Look Now | Elvis Costello; Sebastian Krys | 2018 | |
| "Veronica" | Elvis Costello | Elvis Costello; Paul McCartney | Spike | Elvis Costello; Kevin Killen; T Bone Burnett | 1989 | |
| "The Very Thought of You" (Ray Noble featuring Al Bowlly cover) | Elvis Costello | Ray Noble † | Kojak Variety | Elvis Costello; Kevin Killen | 1995 | |
| "A Voice in the Dark" | Elvis Costello | Elvis Costello | National Ransom | T Bone Burnett | 2010 | |
| "Waiting for the End of the World" | Elvis Costello | Elvis Costello | My Aim Is True | Nick Lowe | 1977 | |
| "Walking on Thin Ice" (Yoko Ono cover) | Elvis Costello and the Attractions (with the TKO Horns) | Joe Camilleri; Jeff Burstin; Tony Faehse † | Every Man Has a Woman | Allen Toussaint | 1984 | |
| "Watch Your Step" | Elvis Costello and the Attractions | Elvis Costello | Trust | Nick Lowe; Roger Béchirian | 1981 | |
| "Watching the Detectives" | Elvis Costello | Elvis Costello | Non-album single (UK); My Aim Is True (US edition) (Note: "Watching the Detectives" is the final track on My Aim Is True following the 1993 reissue.) | Nick Lowe | 1977 | |
| "Wave a White Flag" | Elvis Costello | Elvis Costello | My Aim Is True (1993 reissue) | Nick Lowe | 1993 | |
| "We Are All Cowards Now" | Elvis Costello | Elvis Costello | Hey Clockface | Elvis Costello; Sebastian Krys; Michael Leonhart | 2020 | |
| "We Despise You" (First recorded by Wendy James in 1993) | Elvis Costello | Declan MacManus; Cait O'Riordan | "13 Steps Lead Down" EP | Mitchell Froom; Elvis Costello | 1994 | |
| "The Wedding" | Elvis Costello | Elvis Costello | Il Sogno | Sid McLauchlan | 2004 | |
| "Wednesday Week" | Elvis Costello | Elvis Costello | B-side of "Talking in the Dark"; Taking Liberties | Nick Lowe | 1978 | |
| "Weeper's Dream" | Elvis Costello and the Attractions | Elvis Costello | Trust (1994 reissue) | Elvis Costello | 1994 | |
| "Welcome to the Working Week" | Elvis Costello | Elvis Costello | My Aim Is True | Nick Lowe | 1977 | |
| "What Do I Do Now?" (Sleeper cover) | Elvis Costello | Louise Wener † | 17 Volume (Fifth Birthday Bumper Bonanza!); All This Useless Beauty (2001 reissue) | Elvis Costello | 2001 | |
| "What I Like Most About You Is Your Girlfriend" ‡ (The Specials cover) | Elvis Costello and the Attractions | Jerry Dammers † | Goodbye Cruel World (2004 reissue) | Elvis Costello | 2004 | |
| "What If I Can't Give You Anything But Love?" | Elvis Costello and the Imposters | Elvis Costello | The Boy Named If | Elvis Costello; Sebastian Krys | 2022 | |
| "What Is It That I Need That I Don't Already Have?" | Elvis Costello | Elvis Costello | Hey Clockface | Elvis Costello; Sebastian Krys; Michael Leonhart | 2020 | |
| "What Lewis Did Last" | Elvis Costello | Traditional; Elvis Costello | Secret, Profane & Sugarcane (LP & Japan CD editions) | T Bone Burnett | 2009 | |
| "(What's So Funny 'Bout) Peace, Love, and Understanding" (Brinsley Schwarz cover) | Elvis Costello and the Attractions | Nick Lowe † | Non-album single (UK); Armed Forces (US edition) (Note: The 1993 reissue of Armed Forces added "(What's So Funny 'Bout) Peace, Love, and Understanding" as the album's final track.) | Nick Lowe | 1979 | |
| "When Did I Stop Dreaming?" | Elvis Costello | Elvis Costello | North | Elvis Costello; Kevin Killen | 2003 | |
| "When Green Eyes Turn Blue" | Elvis Costello | Elvis Costello | North | Elvis Costello; Kevin Killen | 2003 | |
| "When I Was Cruel (No. 1)" | Elvis Costello | Elvis Costello | B-side of "Tear Off Your Own Head (It's A Doll Revolution)"; Cruel Smile | The Imposter | 2002 | |
| "When I Was Cruel No. 2" | Elvis Costello | Elvis Costello | When I Was Cruel | The Imposter | 2002 | |
| "When It Sings" | Elvis Costello | Elvis Costello | North | Elvis Costello; Kevin Killen | 2003 | |
| "The Whirlwind" | Elvis Costello | Elvis Costello | Hey Clockface | Elvis Costello; Sebastian Krys; Michael Leonhart | 2020 | |
| "White Knuckles" | Elvis Costello and the Attractions | Elvis Costello | Trust | Nick Lowe; Roger Béchirian | 1981 | |
| "Why Can't a Man Stand Alone?" | Elvis Costello and the Attractions | Declan MacManus | All This Useless Beauty | Geoff Emerick; Elvis Costello | 1996 | |
| "Why Don't You Love Me (Like You Used to Do)?" (Hank Williams cover) | Elvis Costello and the Attractions | Hank Williams † | Almost Blue | Billy Sherrill | 1981 | |
| "Why Won't Heaven Help Me?" | Elvis Costello & the Imposters | Elvis Costello | Look Now | Elvis Costello; Sebastian Krys | 2018 | |
| "Withered and Died" (Richard and Linda Thompson cover) | The Imposter | Richard Thompson † | B-side of "Peace in Our Time"; Out of Our Idiot | Clive Langer; Alan Winstanley | 1984 | |
| "Wondering" ‡ (Webb Pierce cover) | Elvis Costello and the Attractions | Joe Werner † | Almost Blue (2004 reissue) | Billy Sherrill | 2004 | |
| "Worker's Playtime" | Elvis Costello | Elvis Costello | Il Sogno | Sid McLauchlan | 2004 | |
| "The World and His Wife" | Elvis Costello and the Attractions | Elvis Costello | Punch the Clock | Clive Langer; Alan Winstanley | 1983 | |
| "The World of Broken Hearts" (Amen Corner cover) | Elvis Costello and the Attractions | Doc Pomus; Mort Shuman † | B-side of "From Head to Toe"; Imperial Bedroom (1994 reissue) | Elvis Costello | 1994 | |
| "World's Great Optimist" | Elvis Costello | Declan MacManus; Aimee Mann | All This Useless Beauty (2001 reissue) | Elvis Costello | 2001 | |
| "Worthless Thing" | Elvis Costello and the Attractions | Elvis Costello | Goodbye Cruel World | Clive Langer; Alan Winstanley | 1984 | |
| "You Belong to Me" | Elvis Costello and the Attractions | Elvis Costello | This Year's Model | Nick Lowe | 1978 | |
| "You Bowed Down" (First released by Roger McGuinn in 1991) | Elvis Costello and the Attractions | Declan MacManus | All This Useless Beauty | Geoff Emerick; Elvis Costello | 1996 | |
| "You Hung the Moon" | Elvis Costello | Elvis Costello | National Ransom | T Bone Burnett | 2010 | |
| "You Left Me in the Dark" | Elvis Costello | Elvis Costello | North | Elvis Costello; Kevin Killen | 2003 | |
| "You Little Fool" | Elvis Costello and the Attractions | Elvis Costello | Imperial Bedroom | Geoff Emerick | 1982 | |
| "You Shouldn't Look at Me That Way" | Elvis Costello & the Imposters | Elvis Costello | Look Now (Regarde Maintenant EP) | Elvis Costello; Sebastian Krys | 2018 | |
| "You Stole My Bell" | Elvis Costello | Elvis Costello; Cait O'Riordan | The Family Man (Music from the Motion Picture) | Brett Ratner; Randall Poster | 2000 | |
| "You Tripped at Every Step" | Elvis Costello | Declan MacManus | Brutal Youth | Elvis Costello; Mitchell Froom | 1994 | |
| "You Turned to Me" | Elvis Costello | Elvis Costello | North | Elvis Costello; Kevin Killen | 2003 | |
| "Young Boy Blues" (Ben E. King cover) | Elvis Costello and the Attractions | Doc Pomus † | Goodbye Cruel World (2004 reissue) | Elvis Costello; Colin Fairley | 2004 | |
| "Your Angel Steps Out of Heaven" ‡ (Jack Ripley cover) | Elvis Costello and the Attractions | Jack Ripley † | Almost Blue (1994 reissue) | Billy Sherrill | 1994 | |
| "Your Mind Is on Vacation" / "Your Funeral and My Trial" ‡ (Mose Allison/Sonny Boy Williamson II cover) | The Costello Show featuring the Confederates | Mose Allison / Sonny Boy Williamson II † | King of America (2005 reissue) | Elvis Costello | 2005 | |
| "You'll Never Be a Man" | Elvis Costello and the Attractions | Elvis Costello | Trust | Nick Lowe; Roger Béchirian | 1981 | |
| "You're Gonna Make Me Lonesome When You Go" (Bob Dylan cover) | Elvis Costello | Bob Dylan † | Kojak Variety (2004 reissue) | Elvis Costello; Kevin Killen | 2004 | |
| "You're No Good" (Dee Dee Warwick cover) | Elvis Costello | Clint Ballard Jr. † | B-side of "Veronica" | Elvis Costello; Kevin Killen; T Bone Burnett | 1989 | |
| "You've Got to Hide Your Love Away" (The Beatles cover) | Elvis Costello | John Lennon; Paul McCartney † | Kojak Variety (2004 reissue) | Elvis Costello; Kevin Killen | 2004 | |

== Collaborative songs ==
Key
| † | Indicates songs written or co-written by others and traditional songs |

Name of song, artist credit, writer(s), original release, producer(s), and year of release
| Song | Artist(s) | Writer(s) | Original release | Producer(s) | Year | Ref(s) |
|---|---|---|---|---|---|---|
| "All These Things" (Joe Stampley cover) | Elvis Costello and Allen Toussaint | Allen Toussaint † | The River in Reverse | Joe Henry | 2006 | |
| "Always" | The Coward Brothers | Howard Coward; Henry Coward | The Coward Brothers | Henry Coward; Howard Coward | 2024 | |
| "Another Time, Another Place" | Elvis Costello and Richard Harvey | Elvis Costello; Richard Harvey | G.B.H. | Austin Ince; Elvis Costello; Richard Harvey | 1991 | |
| "Anyone Who Had a Heart" ‡ | Elvis Costello and Burt Bacharach | Burt Bacharach; Hal David † | The Songs of Bacharach & Costello | – | 2023 | |
| "April 5th" | Elvis Costello, Rosanne Cash and Kris Kristofferson | Elvis Costello; Rosanne Cash; Kris Kristofferson | Unfaithful Music & Soundtrack Album | John Leventhal | 2015 | |
| "April After All" (Ron Sexsmith cover) | Anne Sofie von Otter meets Elvis Costello | Ron Sexsmith † | For the Stars | Elvis Costello | 2001 | |
| "Ascension Day" | Elvis Costello and Allen Toussaint | Elvis Costello; Allen Toussaint; Roy "Professor Longhair" Byrd | The River in Reverse | Joe Henry | 2006 | |
| "At Last" (Glenn Miller cover) | Elvis Costello and Marian McPartland | Mack Gordon; Harry Warren † | Piano Jazz | – | 2005 | |
| "Baby It's You" (The Shirelles cover) | Nick Lowe and Elvis Costello | Burt Bacharach; Mack David; Barney Williams † | B-side of Nick Lowe's "L.A.F.S."; Out of Our Idiot | Nick Lowe; Elvis Costello | 1984 | |
| "Baby Plays Around" | Anne Sofie von Otter meets Elvis Costello | Cait O'Riordan; Declan MacManus | For the Stars | Elvis Costello | 2001 | |
| "Barbara Douglas: Assassin" | Elvis Costello and Richard Harvey | Elvis Costello; Richard Harvey | G.B.H. | Austin Ince; Elvis Costello; Richard Harvey | 1991 | |
| "The Birds Will Still Be Singing" | Elvis Costello and the Brodsky Quartet | Declan MacManus | The Juliet Letters | Brodsky Quartet; Kevin Killen; Elvis Costello | 1993 | |
| "Birkenhead Girl" | The Coward Brothers | Howard Coward | The Coward Brothers | Henry Coward; Howard Coward | 2024 | |
| "Broken Bicycles/Junk" (Tom Waits/Paul McCartney cover) | Anne Sofie von Otter meets Elvis Costello | Tom Waits / Paul McCartney † | For the Stars | Elvis Costello | 2001 | |
| "Broken Promise Land" | Elvis Costello and Allen Toussaint | Elvis Costello; Allen Toussaint | The River in Reverse | Joe Henry | 2006 | |
| "Bubbles" | Elvis Costello and Richard Harvey | Elvis Costello; Richard Harvey | G.B.H. | Austin Ince; Elvis Costello; Richard Harvey | 1991 | |
| "Bygones" | The Coward Brothers | Henry Coward | The Coward Brothers | Henry Coward; Howard Coward | 2024 | |
| "Can She Excuse My Wrongs" ‡ | Elvis Costello with Fretwork and the Composers Ensemble | John Dowland † | Terror & Magnificence; The Juliet Letters (2006 reissue) | – | 2006 | |
| "Can You Hear Me?" | Elvis Costello and the Roots | Elvis Costello; Ahmir Thompson; Steven Mandel | Wise Up Ghost (Deluxe edition) | Elvis Costello; Ahmir Thompson; Steven Mandel | 2013 | |
| "Card Shark" | The New Basement Tapes (Note: The New Basement Tapes is a moniker for Costello, Rhiannon Giddens, Taylor Goldsmith, Jim James and Marcus Mumford.) | Bob Dylan; Taylor Goldsmith † | Lost on the River: The New Basement Tapes | T Bone Burnett | 2014 | |
| "Cathy Come Home" | The Coward Brothers | Howard Coward | The Coward Brothers | Henry Coward; Howard Coward | 2024 | |
| "Cinco Minutos Con Vos" | Elvis Costello and the Roots | Elvis Costello; Ahmir Thompson; Steven Mandel | Wise Up Ghost | Elvis Costello; Ahmir Thompson; Steven Mandel | 2013 | |
| "Closing Titles" | Elvis Costello and Richard Harvey | Elvis Costello; Richard Harvey | G.B.H. | Austin Ince; Elvis Costello; Richard Harvey | 1991 | |
| "Clown Around Town" | The Coward Brothers | Howard Coward | The Coward Brothers | Henry Coward; Howard Coward | 2024 | |
| "Come Away, Death" | John Harle with Elvis Costello | John Harle † | Terror & Magnificence; The Juliet Letters (2006 reissue) | John Harle | 1997 | |
| "Come the Meantimes" | Elvis Costello and the Roots | Elvis Costello; Ahmir Thompson; Steven Mandel; Ronald Dunbar; Daphne Ann Dozier; Edythe Vernelle Craighead | Wise Up Ghost | Elvis Costello; Ahmir Thompson; Steven Mandel | 2013 | |
| "Damnation's Cellar" | Elvis Costello and the Brodsky Quartet | Declan MacManus | The Juliet Letters | Brodsky Quartet; Kevin Killen; Elvis Costello | 1993 | |
| "Dead Letter" | Elvis Costello and the Brodsky Quartet | Paul Cassidy † | The Juliet Letters | Brodsky Quartet; Kevin Killen; Elvis Costello | 1993 | |
| "Dear Sweet Filthy World" | Elvis Costello and the Brodsky Quartet | Declan MacManus; Ian Belton; Michael Thomas | The Juliet Letters | Brodsky Quartet; Kevin Killen; Elvis Costello | 1993 | |
| "Deep Dead Blue" ‡ | Elvis Costello and Bill Frisell | Elvis Costello; Bill Frisell | Deep Dead Blue | – | 1995 | |
| "Deliver Us" | Elvis Costello and the Brodsky Quartet | Declan MacManus | The Juliet Letters | Brodsky Quartet; Kevin Killen; Elvis Costello | 1993 | |
| "The Devil's Wife" | The Coward Brothers | Howard Coward; Henry Coward | The Coward Brothers | Henry Coward; Howard Coward | 2024 | |
| "Diamond Ring" | The New Basement Tapes | Bob Dylan; Taylor Goldsmith † | Lost on the River: The New Basement Tapes (Deluxe edition) | T Bone Burnett | 2014 | |
| "Don't Lose Your Grip On Love" (Nick Lowe cover) | Rusty (Note: Rusty is a pseudonym for Costello and Allan Mayes. The duo had performed together in the early 1970s before reuniting for the release of The Resurrection of Rust EP (2022).) | Nick Lowe † | The Resurrection of Rust | Elvis Costello; Sebastian Krys | 2022 | |
| "Don't Talk (Put Your Head on My Shoulder)" (The Beach Boys cover) | Anne Sofie von Otter meets Elvis Costello | Brian Wilson; Tony Asher † | For the Stars | Elvis Costello | 2001 | |
| "Down on the Bottom" | The New Basement Tapes | Bob Dylan; Jim James † | Lost on the River: The New Basement Tapes | T Bone Burnett | 2014 | |
| "Duncan and Jimmy" | The New Basement Tapes | Bob Dylan; Rhiannon Giddens † | Lost on the River: The New Basement Tapes | T Bone Burnett | 2014 | |
| "Early Shirley" | The Coward Brothers | Howard Coward | The Coward Brothers | Henry Coward; Howard Coward | 2024 | |
| "Everybody Knows This Is Nowhere" / "Dance Dance Dance" (Neil Young and Crazy Horse cover) | Rusty | Neil Young † | The Resurrection of Rust | Elvis Costello; Sebastian Krys | 2022 | |
| "Expert Rites" | Elvis Costello and the Brodsky Quartet | Declan MacManus | The Juliet Letters | Brodsky Quartet; Kevin Killen; Elvis Costello | 1993 | |
| "Fire Suite 1" | Elvis Costello with Roy Nathanson and Cyrus Chesnut | Roy Nathanson † | Fire at Keaton's Bar & Grill; The Juliet Letters (2006 reissue) | – | 2000 | |
| "Fire Suite 3" | Elvis Costello with Roy Nathanson | Roy Nathanson † | Fire at Keaton's Bar & Grill; The Juliet Letters (2006 reissue) | – | 2000 | |
| "Fire Suite Reprise" | Elvis Costello with Roy Nathanson | Roy Nathanson † | Fire at Keaton's Bar & Grill; The Juliet Letters (2006 reissue) | – | 2000 | |
| "The First to Leave" | Elvis Costello and the Brodsky Quartet | Declan MacManus | The Juliet Letters | Brodsky Quartet; Kevin Killen; Elvis Costello | 1993 | |
| "Florida Key" | The New Basement Tapes | Bob Dylan; Taylor Goldsmith † | Lost on the River: The New Basement Tapes | T Bone Burnett | 2014 | |
| "For the Stars" | Anne Sofie von Otter meets Elvis Costello | Elvis Costello | For the Stars | Elvis Costello | 2001 | |
| "For No One" (The Beatles cover) | Anne Sofie von Otter meets Elvis Costello | John Lennon; Paul McCartney † | For the Stars | Elvis Costello | 2001 | |
| "For Other Eyes" | Elvis Costello and the Brodsky Quartet | Declan MacManus; Michael Thomas; Paul Cassidy | The Juliet Letters | Brodsky Quartet; Kevin Killen; Elvis Costello | 1993 | |
| "Forgive Her Anything" (Note: A new version appears on the 2002 reissue of Blood & Chocolate, which Costello believed was superior to the one on the 1995 reissue. A home demo appears on the 2002 reissue of Mighty Like a Rose.) | Elvis Costello and the Attractions | Declan MacManus | Blood & Chocolate (1995 reissue) | Nick Lowe | 1995 | |
| "Freedom for the Stallion" | Elvis Costello and Allen Toussaint | Allen Toussaint † | The River in Reverse | Joe Henry | 2006 | |
| "G.B.H. Opening Titles: The Life and Times of Michael Murray" | Elvis Costello and Richard Harvey | Elvis Costello; Richard Harvey | G.B.H. | Austin Ince; Elvis Costello; Richard Harvey | 1991 | |
| "Gigi" ‡ | Elvis Costello and Bill Frisell | Alan Jay Lerner; Frederick Loewe † | Deep Dead Blue | – | 1995 | |
| "Go Leave" (Kate McGarrigle cover) | Anne Sofie von Otter meets Elvis Costello | Kate McGarrigle † | For the Stars | Elvis Costello | 2001 | |
| "God Give Me Strength" | Elvis Costello and Burt Bacharach | Elvis Costello; Burt Bacharach | Painted from Memory | Burt Bacharach; Elvis Costello | 1998 | |
| "God Only Knows" ‡ (The Beach Boys cover) | Elvis Costello and the Brodsky Quartet | Brian Wilson; Tony Asher; Arr. by Michael Thomas † | Live at New York Town Hall (EP); The Juliet Letters (2006 reissue) | Brodsky Quartet | 1993 | |
| "Going Home Service" | Elvis Costello and Richard Harvey | Elvis Costello; Richard Harvey | G.B.H. | Austin Ince; Elvis Costello; Richard Harvey | 1991 | |
| "Golden Tom – Silver Judas" | The New Basement Tapes | Bob Dylan; Elvis Costello | Lost on the River: The New Basement Tapes (Deluxe edition) | T Bone Burnett | 2014 | |
| "The 'Goldilocks' Theme" | Elvis Costello and Richard Harvey | Elvis Costello; Richard Harvey | G.B.H. | Austin Ince; Elvis Costello; Richard Harvey | 1991 | |
| "Grave Music" | Elvis Costello and Richard Harvey | Elvis Costello; Richard Harvey | G.B.H. | Austin Ince; Elvis Costello; Richard Harvey | 1991 | |
| "The Greatest Love" | Elvis Costello and Allen Toussaint | Allen Toussaint † | The River in Reverse (Japan CD) | Joe Henry | 2006 | |
| "Green Song" | Anne Sofie von Otter meets Elvis Costello | Elvis Costello; Svante Henryson | For the Stars | Elvis Costello | 2001 | |
| "'He's So Easy'" | Elvis Costello and Richard Harvey | Elvis Costello; Richard Harvey | G.B.H. | Austin Ince; Elvis Costello; Richard Harvey | 1991 | |
| "Hidee Hidee Ho #11" | The New Basement Tapes | Bob Dylan; Jim James † | Lost on the River: The New Basement Tapes | T Bone Burnett | 2014 | |
| "Hidee Hidee Ho #16" | The New Basement Tapes | Bob Dylan; Jim James † | Lost on the River: The New Basement Tapes (Deluxe edition) | T Bone Burnett | 2014 | |
| "Hora Decubitus" | Elvis Costello Live with the Metropole Orkest | Charles Mingus; Elvis Costello | My Flame Burns Blue | Elvis Costello | 2006 | |
| "I Almost Had a Weakness" | Elvis Costello and the Brodsky Quartet | Declan MacManus; Michael Thomas | The Juliet Letters | Brodsky Quartet; Kevin Killen; Elvis Costello | 1993 | |
| "(I Don't Want Your) Lyndon Johnson" | The Coward Brothers | Howard Coward | The Coward Brothers | Henry Coward; Howard Coward | 2024 | |
| "I Still Have That Other Girl" | Elvis Costello and Burt Bacharach | Elvis Costello; Burt Bacharach | Painted from Memory | Burt Bacharach; Elvis Costello | 1998 | |
| "I Thought I'd Write to Juliet" | Elvis Costello and the Brodsky Quartet | Declan MacManus | The Juliet Letters | Brodsky Quartet; Kevin Killen; Elvis Costello | 1993 | |
| "I Throw My Toys Around" | No Doubt featuring Elvis Costello | Elvis Costello; Cait O'Riordan | The Rugrats Movie: Music from the Motion Picture | Elvis Costello | 1998 | |
| "I Turn Around" | Elvis Costello and the Attractions | Elvis Costello | Imperial Bedroom(1994 reissue) | Elvis Costello | 1994 | |
| "I Want to Vanish" | Anne Sofie von Otter meets Elvis Costello | Elvis Costello | For the Stars | Elvis Costello | 2001 | |
| "If I Could Believe" | Elvis Costello and the Roots | Elvis Costello | Wise Up Ghost | Elvis Costello; Ahmir Thompson; Steven Mandel | 2013 | |
| "In a Cemetery Garden" | Elvis Costello and Richard Harvey | Elvis Costello; Richard Harvey | G.B.H. | Austin Ince; Elvis Costello; Richard Harvey | 1991 | |
| "In the Darkest Place" | Elvis Costello and Burt Bacharach | Elvis Costello; Burt Bacharach | Painted from Memory | Burt Bacharach; Elvis Costello | 1998 | |
| "International Echo" | Elvis Costello and Allen Toussaint | Elvis Costello; Allen Toussaint | The River in Reverse | Joe Henry | 2006 | |
| "It Wasn't Me" | Elvis Costello and Richard Harvey | Elvis Costello; Richard Harvey | G.B.H. | Austin Ince; Elvis Costello; Richard Harvey | 1991 | |
| "'It's Cold Up There'" | Elvis Costello and Richard Harvey | Elvis Costello; Richard Harvey | G.B.H. | Austin Ince; Elvis Costello; Richard Harvey | 1991 | |
| "I'll Never Fall in Love Again" (Dionne Warwick cover) | Elvis Costello and Burt Bacharach | Burt Bacharach; Hal David † | Austin Powers: The Spy Who Shagged Me (soundtrack) | Burt Bacharach; Elvis Costello | 1999 | |
| "I'll Take Care of You" ‡ (Bobby Bland cover) | Elvis Costello and the Attractions | Brook Benton † | Almost Blue (2004 reissue) | Billy Sherrill | 2004 | |
| "I'm Ahead If I Can Quit While I'm Behind" (Bobby Womack cover) | Rusty | Jim Ford † | The Resurrection of Rust | Elvis Costello; Sebastian Krys | 2022 | |
| "Jacksons, Monk and Rowe" | Elvis Costello and the Brodsky Quartet | Declan MacManus; Jacqueline Thomas; Michael Thomas | The Juliet Letters | Brodsky Quartet; Kevin Killen; Elvis Costello | 1993 | |
| "Just a Curio" | Anne Sofie von Otter meets Elvis Costello | Fleshquartet; Elvis Costello | For the Stars | Elvis Costello | 2001 | |
| "Just a Memory" | Elvis Costello and the Attractions | Elvis Costello | Get Happy!! (1994 reissue) | Elvis Costello | 1994 | |
| "Kansas City" | The New Basement Tapes | Bob Dylan; Marcus Mumford; Taylor Goldsmith † | Lost on the River: The New Basement Tapes | T Bone Burnett | 2014 | |
| "King of the Unknown Sea" ‡ | Elvis Costello and the Brodsky Quartet | Declan MacManus; Michael Thomas | The Juliet Letters (2006 reissue) | Brodsky Quartet | 2006 | |
| "Lambs to the Slaughter" | Elvis Costello and Richard Harvey | Elvis Costello; Richard Harvey | G.B.H. | Austin Ince; Elvis Costello; Richard Harvey | 1991 | |
| "Last Post" | Elvis Costello and the Brodsky Quartet | Michael Thomas † | The Juliet Letters | Brodsky Quartet; Kevin Killen; Elvis Costello | 1993 | |
| "The Letter Home" | Elvis Costello and the Brodsky Quartet | Declan MacManus; Ian Belton; Paul Cassidy | The Juliet Letters | Brodsky Quartet; Kevin Killen; Elvis Costello | 1993 | |
| "Liberty Street" | The New Basement Tapes | Bob Dylan; Taylor Goldsmith † | Lost on the River: The New Basement Tapes | T Bone Burnett | 2014 | |
| "Like an Angel Passing Through My Room" (ABBA cover) | Anne Sofie von Otter meets Elvis Costello | Benny Andersson; Björn Ulvaeus † | For the Stars | Elvis Costello | 2001 | |
| "Like Licorice" | The Coward Brothers | Howard Coward | The Coward Brothers | Henry Coward; Howard Coward | 2024 | |
| "The Long Division" | Elvis Costello and Burt Bacharach | Elvis Costello; Burt Bacharach | Painted from Memory | Burt Bacharach; Elvis Costello | 1998 | |
| "Lost in the Stars" | Elvis Costello and the Brodsky Quartet | Kurt Weill † | September Songs: The Music of Kurt Weill; The Juliet Letters (2006 reissue) | Brodsky Quartet; Elvis Costello; Hal Willner | 1997 | |
| "Lost on the River #12" | The New Basement Tapes | Bob Dylan; Elvis Costello | Lost on the River: The New Basement Tapes | T Bone Burnett | 2014 | |
| "Lost on the River #20" | The New Basement Tapes | Bob Dylan; Marcus Mumford; Rhiannon Giddens † | Lost on the River: The New Basement Tapes | T Bone Burnett | 2014 | |
| "Lotta Money" | The Coward Brothers | Howard Coward; Henry Coward; Christopher Guest | The Coward Brothers | Henry Coward; Howard Coward | 2024 | |
| "Love from a Cold Land" | Elvis Costello and Richard Harvey | Elvis Costello; Richard Harvey | G.B.H. | Austin Ince; Elvis Costello; Richard Harvey | 1991 | |
| "Make It Easy on Yourself" ‡ | Elvis Costello and Burt Bacharach | Burt Bacharach; Hal David † | The Songs of Bacharach & Costello | – | 2023 | |
| "Married to My Hack" | The New Basement Tapes | Bob Dylan; Elvis Costello | Lost on the River: The New Basement Tapes | T Bone Burnett | 2014 | |
| "Maureen & Sam" | Rusty | Allan Mayes; Declan MacManus | The Resurrection of Rust | Elvis Costello; Sebastian Krys | 2022 | |
| "Men of Alloy" | Elvis Costello and Richard Harvey | Elvis Costello; Richard Harvey | G.B.H. | Austin Ince; Elvis Costello; Richard Harvey | 1991 | |
| "More Than Rain" ‡ (Tom Waits cover) | Elvis Costello and the Brodsky Quartet | Tom Waits † | Live at New York Town Hall (EP); The Juliet Letters (2006 reissue) | Brodsky Quartet | 1993 | |
| "My Baby Just Purrs (You're Mine, Not Hers)" | The Coward Brothers | Howard Coward | The Coward Brothers | Henry Coward; Howard Coward | 2024 | |
| "My Baby Just Squeals (You Heel)" | The Coward Brothers | Howard Coward | The Coward Brothers | Henry Coward; Howard Coward | 2024 | |
| "My Baby Just Whistles (Here Comes the Missiles)" | The Coward Brothers | Howard Coward | The Coward Brothers | Henry Coward; Howard Coward | 2024 | |
| "My Dark Life" | Elvis Costello with Brian Eno | Elvis Costello | Songs in the Key of X All This Useless Beauty (2001 reissue) | Brian Eno; Elvis Costello | 2001 | |
| "My Flame Burns Blue (Blood Count)" | Elvis Costello Live with the Metropole Orkest | Elvis Costello; Billy Strayhorn | My Flame Burns Blue | Elvis Costello | 2006 | |
| "My Little Red Book" ‡ | Elvis Costello and Burt Bacharach | Burt Bacharach; Hal David † | The Songs of Bacharach & Costello | – | 2023 | |
| "My New Haunt" | Elvis Costello and the Roots | Elvis Costello; Ahmir Thompson; Steven Mandel | Wise Up Ghost (Deluxe edition) | Elvis Costello; Ahmir Thompson; Steven Mandel | 2013 | |
| "My Thief" | Elvis Costello and Burt Bacharach | Elvis Costello; Burt Bacharach | Painted from Memory | Burt Bacharach; Elvis Costello | 1998 | |
| "Nearer to You" | Elvis Costello and Allen Toussaint | Allen Toussaint † | The River in Reverse | Joe Henry | 2006 | |
| "No Wonder" | Anne Sofie von Otter meets Elvis Costello | Elvis Costello | For the Stars | Elvis Costello | 2001 | |
| "Nothing to It" | The New Basement Tapes | Bob Dylan; Jim James † | Lost on the River: The New Basement Tapes | T Bone Burnett | 2014 | |
| "O Mistree Mine" | John Harle with Elvis Costello | John Harle † | Terror & Magnificence; The Juliet Letters (2006 reissue) | John Harle | 1997 | |
| "On Your Way Down" | Elvis Costello and Allen Toussaint | Allen Toussaint † | The River in Reverse | Joe Henry | 2006 | |
| "The Other Woman" (Jessie Mae Robinson cover) | Anne Sofie von Otter meets Elvis Costello | Jessie Mae Robinson † | For the Stars | Elvis Costello | 2001 | |
| "Painted from Memory" | Elvis Costello and Burt Bacharach | Elvis Costello; Burt Bacharach | Painted from Memory | Burt Bacharach; Elvis Costello | 1998 | |
| "The People's Limousine" | The Coward Brothers | Henry Coward; Howard Coward | Out of Our Idiot | The Coward Brothers | 1987 | |
| "Perfume – The Odour of Money" | Elvis Costello and Richard Harvey | Elvis Costello; Richard Harvey | G.B.H. | Austin Ince; Elvis Costello; Richard Harvey | 1991 | |
| "The Puppet Has Cut His Strings" | Elvis Costello and the Roots | Elvis Costello; Ahmir Thompson; Steven Mandel | Wise Up Ghost (Deluxe edition) | Elvis Costello; Ahmir Thompson; Steven Mandel | 2013 | |
| "The Puppet Masters' Work" | Elvis Costello and Richard Harvey | Elvis Costello; Richard Harvey | G.B.H. | Austin Ince; Elvis Costello; Richard Harvey | 1991 | |
| "Pure Bubblegum" | The Coward Brothers | Howard Coward | The Coward Brothers | Henry Coward; Howard Coward | 2024 | |
| "Pursuit Suite" | Elvis Costello and Richard Harvey | Elvis Costello; Richard Harvey | G.B.H. | Austin Ince; Elvis Costello; Richard Harvey | 1991 | |
| "Put Away Forbidden Playthings" (Note: A recording by Costello and Fretwork appears on the 2006 reissue of The Juliet Letters.) | Elvis Costello Live with the Metropole Orkest | Elvis Costello | My Flame Burns Blue | Elvis Costello | 2006 | |
| "Quick Like a Flash" | The New Basement Tapes | Bob Dylan; Jim James † | Lost on the River: The New Basement Tapes (Deluxe edition) | T Bone Burnett | 2014 | |
| "The River in Reverse" | Elvis Costello and Allen Toussaint | Elvis Costello | The River in Reverse | Joe Henry | 2006 | |
| "The Roaring Boy" with the Prufrock Quartet | Elvis Costello and Richard Harvey | Elvis Costello; Richard Harvey | G.B.H. | Austin Ince; Elvis Costello; Richard Harvey | 1991 | |
| "Row Me Once" | The Coward Brothers | Howard Coward; Henry Coward; Christopher Guest | The Coward Brothers | Henry Coward; Howard Coward | 2024 | |
| "Refuse to Be Saved" | Elvis Costello and the Roots | Elvis Costello; Ahmir Thompson; Steven Mandel | Wise Up Ghost | Elvis Costello; Ahmir Thompson; Steven Mandel | 2013 | |
| "Romeo's Seance" | Elvis Costello and the Brodsky Quartet | Declan MacManus; Michael Thomas | The Juliet Letters | Brodsky Quartet; Kevin Killen; Elvis Costello | 1993 | |
| "Rope" | Anne Sofie von Otter meets Elvis Costello | Fleshquartet; Elvis Costello | For the Stars | Elvis Costello | 2001 | |
| "Seven Day Weekend" | Jimmy Cliff with Elvis Costello and the Attractions | Elvis Costello; Jimmy Cliff | Out of Our Idiot | Nick Lowe; Colin Fairley | 1987 | |
| "Shamed Into Love" ‡ | Elvis Costello and Bill Frisell | Rubén Blades; Elvis Costello | Deep Dead Blue | – | 1995 | |
| "The Sharpest Thorn" | Elvis Costello and Allen Toussaint | Elvis Costello; Allen Toussaint | The River in Reverse | Joe Henry | 2006 | |
| "(She Might Be A) Grenade" | Elvis Costello and the Roots | Elvis Costello; Ahmir Thompson; Steven Mandel | Wise Up Ghost | Elvis Costello; Ahmir Thompson; Steven Mandel | 2013 | |
| "She Moved Through the Fair" (First released by the Brodsky Quartet in 1994) | Elvis Costello and the Brodsky Quartet | Traditional; Arr. by Paul Cassidy † | The Juliet Letters (2006 reissue) | Brodsky Quartet; Paul Bateman | 2006 | |
| "Six Months in Kansas City (Liberty Street)" | The New Basement Tapes | Bob Dylan; Elvis Costello | Lost on the River: The New Basement Tapes | T Bone Burnett | 2014 | |
| "Skeleton" ‡ | Elvis Costello and the Brodsky Quartet | Michael Thomas † | The Juliet Letters (2006 reissue) | Brodsky Quartet | 2006 | |
| "'Smack 'Im!'" | Elvis Costello and Richard Harvey | Elvis Costello; Richard Harvey | G.B.H. | Austin Ince; Elvis Costello; Richard Harvey | 1991 | |
| "Smoke-Ring Angel" | The Coward Brothers | Howard Coward; Christopher Guest | The Coward Brothers | Henry Coward; Howard Coward | 2024 | |
| "'...So I Used Five!'" | Elvis Costello and Richard Harvey | Elvis Costello; Richard Harvey | G.B.H. | Austin Ince; Elvis Costello; Richard Harvey | 1991 | |
| "Spanish Mary" | The New Basement Tapes | Bob Dylan; Rhiannon Giddens † | Lost on the River: The New Basement Tapes | T Bone Burnett | 2014 | |
| "Speak Darkly, My Angel" | Elvis Costello Live with the Metropole Orkest | Elvis Costello | My Flame Burns Blue | Elvis Costello | 2006 | |
| "Stick Out Your Tongue" | Elvis Costello and the Roots | Elvis Costello; Ahmir Thompson; Steven Mandel | Wise Up Ghost | Elvis Costello; Ahmir Thompson; Steven Mandel | 2013 | |
| "Stranger" | The New Basement Tapes | Bob Dylan; Marcus Mumford † | Lost on the River: The New Basement Tapes | T Bone Burnett | 2014 | |
| "Stranger in the House" | George Jones and Elvis Costello | Elvis Costello | My Very Special Guests (Note: "Stranger in the House" was first packaged with the first 50,000 copies of This Year's Model. It was later included on Taking Liberties.) | Billy Sherrill | 1979 | |
| "Such Unlikely Lovers" | Elvis Costello and Burt Bacharach | Elvis Costello; Burt Bacharach | Painted from Memory | Burt Bacharach; Elvis Costello | 1998 | |
| "Sugar Won't Work" | Elvis Costello and the Roots | Elvis Costello; Ahmir Thompson; Steven Mandel | Wise Up Ghost | Elvis Costello; Ahmir Thompson; Steven Mandel | 2013 | |
| "Surrender to the Rhythm" (Nick Lowe cover) | Rusty | Nick Lowe † | The Resurrection of Rust | Elvis Costello; Sebastian Krys | 2022 | |
| "The Sweetest Punch" | Elvis Costello and Burt Bacharach | Elvis Costello; Burt Bacharach | Painted from Memory | Burt Bacharach; Elvis Costello | 1998 | |
| "Swine" | Elvis Costello and the Brodsky Quartet | Declan MacManus; Paul Cassidy | The Juliet Letters | Brodsky Quartet; Kevin Killen; Elvis Costello | 1993 | |
| "Take It with Me" (Tom Waits cover) | Anne Sofie von Otter meets Elvis Costello | Tom Waits; Kathleen Brennan † | For the Stars | Elvis Costello | 2001 | |
| "Taking My Life in Your Hands" | Elvis Costello and the Brodsky Quartet | Declan MacManus; Jacqueline Thomas; Michael Thomas; Paul Cassidy | The Juliet Letters | Brodsky Quartet; Kevin Killen; Elvis Costello | 1993 | |
| "Tears at the Birthday Party" | Elvis Costello and Burt Bacharach | Elvis Costello; Burt Bacharach | Painted from Memory | Burt Bacharach; Elvis Costello | 1998 | |
| "Tears, Tears and More Tears" | Elvis Costello and Allen Toussaint | Allen Toussaint † | The River in Reverse | Joe Henry | 2006 | |
| "That Day Is Done" | Elvis Costello with The Fairfield Four | Declan MacManus; Paul McCartney | I Couldn't Hear Nobody Pray; All This Useless Beauty (2001 reissue) | Trevor Jones | 1999 | |
| "They Didn't Believe Me" ‡ | Elvis Costello and the Brodsky Quartet | Jerome Kern; Arr. by Jacqueline Thomas † | Live at New York Town Hall (EP); The Juliet Letters (2006 reissue) | Brodsky Quartet | 1993 | |
| "This House Is Empty Now" | Elvis Costello and Burt Bacharach | Elvis Costello; Burt Bacharach | Painted from Memory | Burt Bacharach; Elvis Costello | 1998 | |
| "This Offer Is Unrepeatable" | Elvis Costello and the Brodsky Quartet | Declan MacManus; Jacqueline Thomas; Ian Belton; Michael Thomas; Paul Cassidy | The Juliet Letters | Brodsky Quartet; Kevin Killen; Elvis Costello | 1993 | |
| "This Sad Burlesque" | Elvis Costello and the Brodsky Quartet | Declan MacManus; Paul Cassidy | The Juliet Letters | Brodsky Quartet; Kevin Killen; Elvis Costello | 1993 | |
| "Tipsy Woman" | The Coward Brothers | Howard Coward | The Coward Brothers | Henry Coward; Howard Coward | 2024 | |
| "Toledo" | Elvis Costello and Burt Bacharach | Elvis Costello; Burt Bacharach | Painted from Memory | Burt Bacharach; Elvis Costello | 1998 | |
| "Tomorrow's (Just Another Day)" (Madness cover) | Elvis Costello with Madness | Doc Pomus † | B-side of Madness's "Madness (Is All in the Mind)" 12" single Goodbye Cruel World (2004 reissue) | Clive Langer; Alan Winstanley | 1983 | |
| "Tripwire" | Elvis Costello and the Roots | Elvis Costello; Ahmir Thompson; Steven Mandel | Wise Up Ghost | Elvis Costello; Ahmir Thompson; Steven Mandel | 2013 | |
| "Upon a Veil of Midnight Blue" (Note: A recording with the Punishing Kiss Band appears on the 2006 reissue of The Juliet Letters.) | Elvis Costello Live with the Metropole Orkest | Elvis Costello | My Flame Burns Blue | Elvis Costello | 2006 | |
| "Viceroy's Row" | Elvis Costello and the Roots | Elvis Costello; Ahmir Thompson; Steven Mandel | Wise Up Ghost | Elvis Costello; Ahmir Thompson; Steven Mandel | 2013 | |
| "Wake Me Up" | Elvis Costello and the Roots | Elvis Costello; Ahmir Thompson; Steven Mandel | Wise Up Ghost | Elvis Costello; Ahmir Thompson; Steven Mandel | 2013 | |
| "Walk Us Uptown" | Elvis Costello and the Roots | Elvis Costello; Ahmir Thompson; Steven Mandel | Wise Up Ghost | Elvis Costello; Ahmir Thompson; Steven Mandel | 2013 | |
| "Warm House (and an Hour of Joy)" | Rusty | Declan MacManus | The Resurrection of Rust | Elvis Costello; Sebastian Krys | 2022 | |
| "We Oughta Be Ashamed" ‡ (George Jones cover) | Johnny Cash with Elvis Costello | George Jones; Earl Montgomery † | Almost Blue (2004 reissue) | Billy Sherrill | 2004 | |
| "Weird Nightmare" ‡ (Charles Mingus cover) | Elvis Costello and Bill Frisell | Charles Mingus † | Deep Dead Blue | – | 1995 | |
| "What's Her Name Today?" | Elvis Costello and Burt Bacharach | Elvis Costello; Burt Bacharach | Painted from Memory | Burt Bacharach; Elvis Costello | 1998 | |
| "When I Get My Hands on You" | The New Basement Tapes | Bob Dylan; Marcus Mumford; Taylor Goldsmith † | Lost on the River: The New Basement Tapes | T Bone Burnett | 2014 | |
| "Where Is the Love" | Elvis Costello and Allen Toussaint | Elvis Costello; Allen Toussaint | The River in Reverse (iTunes edition) | Joe Henry | 2006 | |
| "The Whistle Is Blowing" | The New Basement Tapes | Bob Dylan; Marcus Mumford † | Lost on the River: The New Basement Tapes (Deluxe edition) | T Bone Burnett | 2014 | |
| "Who Do You Think You Are?" | Elvis Costello and the Brodsky Quartet | Declan MacManus; Michael Thomas | The Juliet Letters | Brodsky Quartet; Kevin Killen; Elvis Costello | 1993 | |
| "Who's Gonna Help Brother Get Further?" | Elvis Costello and Allen Toussaint | Allen Toussaint † | The River in Reverse | Joe Henry | 2006 | |
| "Why?" | Elvis Costello and the Brodsky Quartet | Declan MacManus; Ian Belton | The Juliet Letters | Brodsky Quartet; Kevin Killen; Elvis Costello | 1993 | |
| "Wise Up Ghost" | Elvis Costello and the Roots | Elvis Costello; Ahmir Thompson; Steven Mandel | Wise Up Ghost | Elvis Costello; Ahmir Thompson; Steven Mandel | 2013 | |
| "Wonder Woman" | Elvis Costello and Allen Toussaint | Allen Toussaint † | The River in Reverse | Joe Henry | 2006 | |
| "Wooden Woman" | The Coward Brothers | Howard Coward; Henry Coward | The Coward Brothers | Henry Coward; Howard Coward | 2024 | |
| "Woodlands – On Joy!" | Elvis Costello and Richard Harvey | Richard Harvey † | G.B.H. | Austin Ince; Elvis Costello; Richard Harvey | 1991 | |
| "World Serious" | The Coward Brothers | Howard Coward; Henry Coward | The Coward Brothers | Henry Coward; Howard Coward | 2024 | |
| "Yesteryear Is Near" | The Coward Brothers | Howard Coward | The Coward Brothers | Henry Coward; Howard Coward | 2024 | |
| "You Can Have Her" | Elvis Costello | Elvis Costello; Burt Bacharach | The Songs of Bacharach & Costello | Sebastian Krys; Elvis Costello | 2023 | |
| "You Don't Know What Love Is" (Carol Bruce cover) | Elvis Costello and Marian McPartland | Don Raye; Gene de Paul † | Piano Jazz | – | 2005 | |
| "You Still Believe in Me" (The Beach Boys cover) | Anne Sofie von Otter meets Elvis Costello | Brian Wilson; Tony Asher † | For the Stars | Elvis Costello | 2001 | |
