= The Resurrection of Rust =

EP by Rusty
- Released: 10 June 2022
- Recorded: 2021
- Studios: Bonaparte Rooms West; Chateau Shorty; Frogville Studios, Santa Fe, New Mexico, United States; Sentry Sound; Studio Pasteur, Puteaux, France
- Genre: Rock
- Length: 23:22
- Language: English
- Label: EMI
- Producers: Elvis Costello; Sebastian Krys

Elvis Costello chronology
The Boy Named If (2022)	The Resurrection of Rust (2022)	The Songs of Bacharach & Costello (2023)

The Resurrection of Rust is a 2022 extended play from Rusty, a musical duo of Elvis Costello and Allan Mayes which had broken up 50 years prior and reunited for this release. This is the first recorded work by the group, who disbanded when Costello hit out for a solo career.

== Reception ==
Professional ratings
Review scores
Source	Rating
AllMusic	3.5/5 stars
Clash Music	7/10
The Irish Times	3/5 stars
Mojo	3/5 stars
The Scotsman	3/5 stars

Editors at AllMusic rated this album 3.5 out of 5 stars, with critic Mark Deming writing that "Allan Mayes turns out to be a great vocal match for Costello" and "they sound like they're having a blast". Susan Hansen of Clash Music rated this album a 7 out of 10, praising the "fuzzy, but romantic vibe" of some tracks and characterizing it as "a warm boost down memory lane in one way, while the modern times filter gives the record intricacy, and it is one to check out". In The Irish Times, Tony Clayton-Lea rated The Resurrection of Rust 3 out of 5 stars, characterizing it as "an intriguing glimpse at the formative years of one of rock music’s most prolific and resourceful scallywags". Tom Doyle of Mojo rated this album 3 out of 5 stars for being "a diverting curio, ... rather than essential" and encouraged the musicians to team up again. Fiona Shepherd of The Scotsman also gave 3 out of 5 stars, stating that the recording has an "executed with a carefree, celebratory feel". Writing for Ultimate Classic Rock, Gary Graff calls this a nice "curio in Costello's catalog".

== Track listing ==
No.	Title	Writer(s)	Length
1.	"Surrender to the Rhythm"	Nick Lowe	3:42
2.	"I'm Ahead If I Can Quit While I'm Behind"	Jim Ford	3:54
3.	"Warm House (and an Hour of Joy)"	Declan P. McManus	4:25
4.	"Don't Lose Your Grip On Love"	Lowe	4:23
5.	"Maureen & Sam"	Allan Mayes & McManus	3:07
6.	"Everybody Knows This Is Nowhere" / "Dance Dance Dance"	Neil Young	3:55
Total length:			23:22

== Personnel ==
Rusty

- Elvis Costello – guitar, piano, mandolin, electric fiddle, bass guitar, vocals, production
- Allan Mayes – guitar, vocals

Additional personnel

- Bob Andrews – organ on "Surrender to the Rhythm", piano on "Surrender to the Rhythm"
- Davey Faragher – bass guitar
- Daniel Galindo – engineering
- Jeff Galindo – mastering at The Bakery
- Kevin Green – recording
- Sebastian Krys – mixing at The Big Top Studios, production
- Steve Nieve – organ
- Coco Shinomiya – sleeve, design, layout
- Eamon Singer – sleeve, design, layout
- Pete Thomas – drums
- Ladonna Wolfe – photography

== See also ==
- Lists of 2022 albums
