= North (Elvis Costello album) =

Studio album by Elvis Costello
- Released: 23 September 2003
- Studios: AIR, London; Avatar, New York City; Nola, New York City
- Genre: Pop
- Length: 40:31
- Label: Deutsche Grammophon
- Producers: Elvis Costello, Kevin Killen

Elvis Costello chronology
Cruel Smile (2002)	North (2003)	Il Sogno (2004)

Professional ratings
Review scores
Source	Rating
AllMusic	3.5/5 stars
Pitchfork	3.9/10

North is an album by English singer-songwriter Elvis Costello, released in 2003. Contrasting with its rock-based predecessor When I Was Cruel (2002), North is an intimate album of ballads and torch songs using classical music and jazz idioms, partially inspired by the dissolution of his marriage to wife Cait O'Riordan and his burgeoning relationship with Diana Krall. It reached No. 44 in the UK Albums Chart, No. 57 in the US Billboard 200 chart and No. 1 in the US Traditional Jazz chart.

== Track listing ==
All tracks are written by Elvis Costello.

No.	Title	Length
1.	"You Left Me in the Dark"	3:26
2.	"Someone Took the Words Away"	4:35
3.	"When Did I Stop Dreaming?"	5:22
4.	"You Turned to Me"	2:32
5.	"Fallen"	3:12
6.	"When It Sings"	3:58
7.	"Still"	2:27
8.	"Let Me Tell You About Her"	4:23
9.	"Can You Be True?"	3:45
10.	"When Green Eyes Turn Blue"	4:17
11.	"I'm in the Mood Again"	2:34
Total length:		40:31

- The UK, Japanese, and SACD editions contain the bonus track "Impatience". The Japanese edition also contains another bonus track, "Too Blue".

=== Limited edition DVD ===
1. "North" (Solo Live Performance) – 3:06
2. "Still" (Studio Version Promo Video) – 2:44
3. "Fallen" (Solo Live Performance) – 3:08

== Charts ==
Chart performance for North
Chart (2003)	Peak position
Australian Albums (ARIA)	73
Belgian Albums (Ultratop Flanders)	12
Dutch Albums (Album Top 100)	56
German Albums (Offizielle Top 100)	84
Italian Albums (FIMI)	53
Norwegian Albums (VG-lista)	25
Portuguese Albums (AFP)	9
Swedish Albums (Sverigetopplistan)	25
UK Albums (Official Charts)	44
US Billboard 200	57
US Top Jazz Albums (Billboard)	2
