= Hey Clockface =

Studio album by Elvis Costello
- Released: 30 October 2020
- Recorded: 2019–February 2020
- Studio: Suomenlinnan Studio, Helsinki; Les Studios Saint Germain, Paris; Leonia Sound, New Jersey
- Genre: Pop rock
- Length: 49:52
- Label: Concord
- Producer: Elvis Costello; Sebastian Krys; Michael Leonhart

Elvis Costello chronology
Purse (2019)	Hey Clockface (2020)	The Boy Named If (2022)

Hey Clockface is the 31st studio album by English singer-songwriter Elvis Costello, released on 30 October 2020 by Concord Records.

== Critical reception ==
Professional ratings
Aggregate scores
Source	Rating
Metacritic	78/100
Review scores
Source	Rating
AllMusic	4/5 stars
The Independent	4/5 stars
musicOMH	3.5/4 stars
The Observer	3/5 stars
Pitchfork	7.5/10
The Telegraph	3/5 stars

Hey Clockface received generally positive reviews from critics. At Metacritic, which assigns a normalized rating out of 100 to reviews from critics, the album received an average score of 78, which indicates "generally favorable reviews", based on 9 reviews.

Stephen Thomas Erlewine of AllMusic gave Hey Clockface a positive 4-star review, stating that the record shows "Costello's mastery of mood and storytelling". Writing for Pitchfork, Daniel Felsenthal noted that Hey Clockface merges the "potentially divergent sensibilities" of "driving, ageless rock" and "conventions of the American songbook" into "an adventurous set of songs about time's ceaseless march....Alone, either style might have seemed like predictable genre play for Costello at this stage in his career, but together, they make for an album that's energetic and consistently surprising."

== Track listing ==
All tracks are written by Elvis Costello, except where noted.

No.	Title	Writer(s)	Length
1.	"Revolution #49"		2:41
2.	"No Flag"		3:56
3.	"They're Not Laughing at Me Now"		4:26
4.	"Newspaper Pane"	Costello; Michael Leonhart; Bill Frisell	4:10
5.	"I Do (Zula's Song)"		3:49
6.	"We Are All Cowards Now"		3:36
7.	"Hey Clockface / How Can You Face Me?"	Costello; Fats Waller; Andy Razaf	2:56
8.	"The Whirlwind"		3:17
9.	"Hetty O'Hara Confidential"		4:14
10.	"The Last Confession of Vivian Whip"	Costello; Steve Nieve; Muriel Téodori	2:59
11.	"What Is It That I Need That I Don't Already Have?"		3:46
12.	"Radio Is Everything"	Costello; Leonhart; Frisell; Nels Cline	4:25
13.	"I Can't Say Her Name"		2:57
14.	"Byline"		2:40
Total length:			49:52

Japanese edition (bonus track)
No.	Title	Length
15.	"Phonographic Memory"	4:05
Total length:		54:04

== Personnel ==
Helsinki recordings (tracks 2, 6, 9)

- Elvis Costello – all voices and instruments

Paris recordings (tracks 1, 3, 5, 7, 8, 10, 11, 13, 14)

- Elvis Costello – voice, guitar, snare drum, bass, piano

Le Quintette Saint Germain:

- Steve Nieve – grand piano, upright piano, organ, mellotron, melodica
- Mickaël Gasche – trumpet, flugelhorn, serpent
- Renaud-Gabriel Pion – contrabass clarinet, bass clarinet, B♭ clarinet, tenor saxophone, bass flute, cor Anglais
- Pierre-François "Titi" Dufour – cello, foot stomps
- AJUQ – drums, percussion, harmonies

New York recordings (tracks 4 and 12)

- Elvis Costello – voice via electrical wire
- Michael Leonhart – trumpet, drums, guitar, synthesizer, bass, organ, trombone, piano, surdu
- Bill Frisell – guitar, loops
- Nels Cline – guitar
- Nick Movshon – drums
- Emily Hope-Price – cello
- Chris Bullock – alto flute
- Danton Boller – acoustic bass fill

== Charts ==
Chart performance for Hey Clockface
Chart (2020)	Peak position
Australian Albums (ARIA)	174
Belgian Albums (Ultratop Flanders)	21
Belgian Albums (Ultratop Wallonia)	166
German Albums (Offizielle Top 100)	91
Scottish Albums (OCC)	15
Swiss Albums (Schweizer Hitparade)	88
UK Albums (OCC)	39
