= G.B.H. (soundtrack) =

Television theme by Elvis Costello and Richard Harvey
- Released: July 1991
- Recorded: February–May 1991
- Genre: Soundtrack
- Length: 69:43
- Label: Demon
- Producers: Alan Bleasdale; Elvis Costello; Austin Ince; David Jones

Elvis Costello chronology
Mighty Like a Rose (1991)	G.B.H. (1991)	The Juliet Letters (1993)

Professional ratings
Review scores
Source	Rating
AllMusic	link
Encyclopedia of Popular Music	2/5 stars
NME	8/10

G.B.H. is an instrumental soundtrack album by English musician Elvis Costello and composer Richard Harvey for the Channel 4's TV series of the same name, released in 1991. It was the first of two collaborations between Costello and Harvey (the second being the score from the series Jake's Progress). It was not available in the U.S. until 1994, when Rykodisc rereleased Costello's entire catalog.

== Track listing ==
All tracks are written by Elvis Costello & Richard Harvey unless otherwise indicated.

Side one
No.	Title	Writer(s)	Length
1.	"G.B.H. Opening Titles: The Life and Times of Michael Murray"		4:32
2.	"It Wasn't Me"		2:01
3.	"Men of Alloy"		3:51
4.	"Lambs to the Slaughter"		4:17
5.	"Bubbles"		2:11
6.	"The 'Goldilocks' Theme"		3:06
7.	"Perfume - The Odour of Money"		4:04
8.	"Barbara Douglas: Assassin"		3:09
9.	"Pursuit Suite"		5:06
10.	"The Roaring Boy"," (with The Prufrock Quartet)	Costello, The Prufrock Quartet	4:01

Side two
No.	Title	Writer(s)	Length
11.	"....So I Used Five!"		1:28
12.	"Love from a Cold Land"		2:28
13.	"In a Cemetery Garden"		1:57
14.	"Smack 'Im!"		2:16
15.	"Woodlands - On Joy!"	Harvey	3:45
16.	"It's Cold Up There"		2:52
17.	"Going Home Service"		5:06
18.	"Grave Music"		2:29
19.	"The Puppet Masters' Work"		4:10
20.	"He's So Easy"		1:58
21.	"Another Time, Another Place"		2:02
22.	"Closing Titles"		2:32
Total length:			69:43
