= The Boy Named If =

Studio album by Elvis Costello and the Imposters
- Released: 14 January 2022
- Recorded: 2021
- Genre: Rock and roll
- Length: 51:58
- Labels: EMI; Capitol
- Producers: Sebastian Krys; Elvis Costello

Elvis Costello and the Imposters chronology
Hey Clockface (2020)	The Boy Named If (2022)	The Resurrection of Rust (2022)

Singles from The Boy Named If
- 1. "Magnificent Hurt" Released: 27 October 2021

The Boy Named If is the 32nd studio album by English singer-songwriter Elvis Costello and the Imposters. The album was released on 14 January 2022 by EMI Records and Capitol Records.

The Boy Named If received critical acclaim and was nominated for Best Rock Album at the 65th Annual Grammy Awards.

== Content ==
The album's first single, "Magnificent Hurt" was released on October 27, 2021. Stereogum's Tom Breihan described the track as a "a straight-up rocker" and compared it to his late 70s work.

== Critical reception ==
Professional ratings
Aggregate scores
Source	Rating
Metacritic	83/100
Review scores
Source	Rating
AllMusic	4/5 stars
American Songwriter	4/5 stars
Classic Rock	4.5/5 stars
Paste	7.8/10
Pitchfork	7.5/10
Slant Magazine	4/5 stars

The Boy Named If received positive reviews from critics. At Metacritic, which assigns a normalised rating out of 100 to reviews from critics, the album received an average score of 83, which indicates "universal acclaim", based on 14 reviews. Stephen Thomas Erlewine wrote that The Boy Named If was Costello's "purest doses of rock and roll since maybe Blood & Chocolate (1986)".

== Track listing ==
All tracks are written by Elvis Costello.

No.	Title	Length
1.	"Farewell, OK"	2:54
2.	"The Boy Named If"	4:24
3.	"Penelope Halfpenny"	2:57
4.	"The Difference"	3:45
5.	"What If I Can't Give You Anything But Love?"	4:03
6.	"Paint the Red Rose Blue"	4:46
7.	"Mistook Me for a Friend"	4:13
8.	"My Most Beautiful Mistake"	4:47
9.	"Magnificent Hurt"	3:13
10.	"The Man You Love to Hate"	4:53
11.	"The Death of Magic Thinking"	3:31
12.	"Trick Out the Truth"	4:53
13.	"Mr. Crescent"	3:39
Total length:		51:58

Japanese edition bonus track
No.	Title	Length
14.	"Truth Drug"	1:41
Total length:		53:45

== Personnel ==
Musicians

- Elvis Costello – vocals, guitar (all tracks); piano (6)
- Davey Faragher – additional vocals, bass (all tracks); upright bass (12)
- Pete Thomas – drums, percussion
- Steve Nieve – keyboards, piano
- Sebastian Krys – background vocals (3, 4)
- Nicole Atkins – vocals (8)

Technical

- Elvis Costello – production
- Sebastian Krys – production, mixing, engineering
- Brian Lucey – mastering
- Daniel Galindo – engineering
- Ron Taylor – engineering
- Dex Green – recording (8)

== Charts ==
Chart performance for The Boy Named If
Chart (2022)	Peak position
Austrian Albums (Ö3 Austria)	47
Belgian Albums (Ultratop Flanders)	20
Belgian Albums (Ultratop Wallonia)	149
German Albums (Offizielle Top 100)	41
Irish Albums (IRMA)	55
Scottish Albums (Official Charts)	1
Swiss Albums (Schweizer Hitparade)	15
UK Albums (Official Charts)	6
US Billboard 200	200
US Top Rock Albums (Billboard)	34
