= Purse (EP) =

EP by Elvis Costello and the Imposters
- Released: April 13, 2019
- Studio: EastWest (Hollywood) (Note: Further recording at United Recording Studios and The Village in Los Angeles, Electric Lady Studios and Sullivan Street Studios in New York, Bell Tone Studios in Nashville (Larkin Poe's contributions), and Armoury Studios in Vancouver (Costello's vocals))
- Length: 12:53
- Label: Concord
- Producer: Sebastian Krys; Elvis Costello

Elvis Costello chronology
Look Now (2018)	Purse (2019)	Hey Clockface (2020)

Purse is an extended play by English singer-songwriter Elvis Costello with the Imposters. It was originally released exclusively on vinyl for Record Store Day on April 13, 2019, with a digital release following the next month. It was produced by Costello and Sebastian Krys and was released through Concord Records. The release contains songwriting collaborations between Costello and Paul McCartney, Burt Bacharach, Johnny Cash, and Bob Dylan.

== Content ==
Purse contains four tracks, each a co-write with another songwriter. "Everyone's Playing House" was co-written with Burt Bacharach, with whom Costello previously made the album Painted from Memory (1998). "The Lovers That Never Were" is a collaboration with Paul McCartney which originally appeared on McCartney's album Off the Ground (1993). "If You Love Me" uses lyrics written, but never recorded, by Johnny Cash, which Costello set to music. "Down on the Bottom" was originally recorded as part of The New Basement Tapes, featuring new music written to old, unused Bob Dylan lyrics; this recording also features "other words" (Note: As credited on the record label) contributed by Costello.

== Track listing ==
Side one
No.	Title	Lyrics	Music	Length
1.	"Everyone's Playing House"	Elvis Costello	Burt Bacharach; Costello	3:05
2.	"The Lovers That Never Were"	Paul McCartney; Costello	McCartney; Costello	4:18
Total length:				7:23

Side two
No.	Title	Lyrics	Music	Length
1.	"If You Love Me"	Johnny Cash	Costello	2:40
2.	"Down on the Bottom"	Bob Dylan; Costello	Costello	2:50
Total length:				5:30

== Personnel ==
Adapted from the EP liner notes:

=== Musicians ===
- Elvis Costello – vocals (all tracks), electric guitar (all tracks), acoustic guitar (1–3), Wurlitzer electric piano (2), glockenspiel (1), vibraphone (1, 2)

The Imposters:

- Pete Thomas – drums (all tracks), percussion (1)
- Davey Faragher – bass (all tracks)
- Steve Nieve – piano (3, 4), grand piano (2), Wurlitzer electric piano (1), Hammond B-3 organ (1, 3, 4)

Other musicians:

- Rebecca Lovell – vocals (4)
- Megan Lovell – vocals (4)

=== Technical ===
- Elvis Costello – production
- Sebastian Krys – production, engineering, mixing
- Ron Taylor – additional engineering
- Roger Alan Nichols – additional engineering (Note: For Larkin Poe's vocals on "Down on the Bottom")
- Chaz Sexton – second engineer
- Scott Moore – second engineer
- Seth Presant – second engineer
- Gosha Usov – second engineer
- Kerry Pompeo – second engineer
- Spencer Bleasdale – second engineer
- Bob Ludwig – mastering
- Doug Emery – charts, pre-production
- Tim Mech – guitar and backline technician
- Duarte Figueira – production assistant
- Ivy Skoff – production coordinator

=== Packaging ===
- Coco Shinomiya – sleeve layout
- Elvis Costello – artwork, (Note: Under the pseudonym "Eamon Singer") photography
- Sebastian Krys – photography
- Tim Mech – photography

== Charts ==
Chart performance for Purse
Chart (2019)	Peak position
UK Physical Singles Chart (OCC)	74
