= Il Sogno =

Studio album by Elvis Costello
- Released: 21 September 2004
- Recorded: April 2002
- Studios: Abbey Road (London, UK)
- Genre: Classical
- Label: Deutsche Grammophon

Elvis Costello chronology
North (2003)	Il Sogno (2004)	The Delivery Man (2004)

Professional ratings
Review scores
Source	Rating
Pitchfork Media	(5.5/10)

Il Sogno is the 20th studio album by Elvis Costello, released in 2004 by Deutsche Grammophon. It is performed by the London Symphony Orchestra conducted by Michael Tilson Thomas, recorded at Abbey Road Studios in London. It peaked at No. 1 on the Billboard Classical Music albums chart.

== Content ==
It is a ballet score for orchestra commissioned by the Aterballetto Dance Company of Reggio Emilia in 2000. The ballet is subtitled Ballet after Shakespeare's "A Midsummer Night's Dream", as it uses A Midsummer Night's Dream by William Shakespeare for its subject material. The premiere performance took place on 31 October 2000, at the Teatro Comunale di Bologna.

An initial recording of the work was made by the house orchestra at the Teatro Comunale to accommodate venues that had no orchestra to present the score live. The present recording was taped over four days in April 2002, with the composer in attendance. It was released the same day as The Delivery Man by Elvis Costello and The Imposters.

An abridged version of this album was included as a bonus disc with the initial release of Costello's 2005 album My Flame Burns Blue. This abridged version omits tracks 5, 6, 7, 11, 21 and 22.

== Track listing ==
All tracks are written by Elvis Costello.

No.	Title	Length
1.	"Prelude"	0:49
2.	"Overture"	1:18
3.	"Puck 1"	2:20

Act one
No.	Title	Length
4.	"The Court"	2:27
5.	"The State of Affairs"	4:44
6.	"Hermia and Lysander"	3:16
7.	"The Jealousy of Helena"	0:55
8.	"Worker's Playtime"	2:16

Act two
No.	Title	Length
9.	"Oberon and Titania"	4:14
10.	"The Conspiracy of Oberon and Puck"	1:08
11.	"Slumber"	1:25
12.	"Puck 2"	1:49
13.	"The Identity Parade"	4:42
14.	"The Face of Bottom"	2:49
15.	"The Spark of Love"	4:22
16.	"Tormentress"	1:41
17.	"Oberon Humbled"	3:41
18.	"Twisted – Entangled – Transform and Exchange"	2:35
19.	"The Fairy and the Ass"	1:35
20.	"Sleep"	2:48
21.	"Bottom Awakes"	1:43
22.	"Lovers Arise"	3:18

Act three
No.	Title	Length
23.	"The Play"	1:31
24.	"The Wedding"	4:22

== Featured personnel ==
- Michael Tilson Thomas – conductor
- John Harle – saxophone
- Chris Laurence – double bass
- Peter Erskine – percussion

== Charts ==
Chart (2004)	Peak position
US Billboard Top Classical Albums	1
