= Elvis Costello discography =

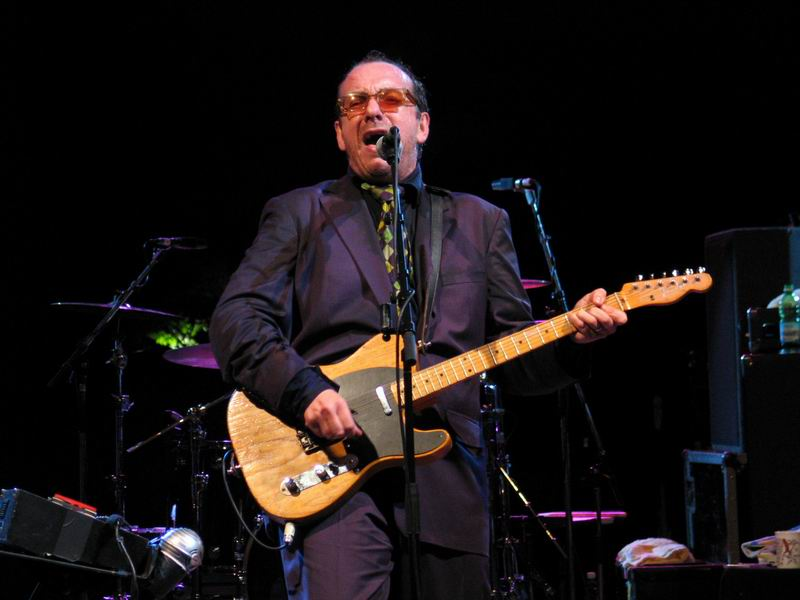
- Costello performing at Glastonbury, 2005
- Studio albums: 33
- Extended plays: 2
- Live albums: 6
- Compilation albums: 17
- Tribute albums: 6
- Singles: 62
- Boxed sets: 4

The discography of the English singer-songwriter Elvis Costello includes 33 studio albums, 6 live albums, 17 compilation albums, 6 tribute albums, 2 extended plays, 62 singles and 4 box sets. This page distinguishes between United States and United Kingdom release dates and record labels. Of note are the reissue series, Costello's back catalogue having undergone reissue three times by three different companies.

== Albums ==
=== Studio albums ===
Year	Title	Artist credit	Chart position												Certifications (sales thresholds)
Year	Title	Artist credit	UK	AUS	CAN	IRL	JPN	NLD	NOR	NZ	SPA	SWE	SWI	US	Certifications (sales thresholds)
1977	My Aim Is True: Released: 22 July 1977; Label: Stiff/Columbia	Elvis Costello (Note: Some reissues of This Year's Model are credited to Elvis Costello and the Attractions.)	14	25	24	–	285	–	–	32	–	14	–	32	Silver (UK); Platinum (US)
1978	This Year's Model: Released: 17 March 1978; Label: Radar/Columbia	Elvis Costello and the Attractions	4	26	21	9	–	14	15	11	–	10	–	30	Gold (UK); Gold (US)
1979	Armed Forces: Released: 5 January 1979; Label: Radar/Columbia	Elvis Costello and the Attractions	2	9	8	5	–	13	12	9	–	11	–	10	Platinum (UK); Gold (US)
1980	Get Happy!!: Released: 15 February 1980; Label: F-Beat/Columbia	Elvis Costello and the Attractions	2	25	24	–	–	34	11	9	–	6	–	11	Gold (UK)
1981	Trust: Released: 23 January 1981; Label: F-Beat/Columbia	Elvis Costello and the Attractions	9	71	13	–	–	–	28	17	–	8	–	28	
1981	Almost Blue: Released: 23 October 1981; Label: F-Beat/Columbia	Elvis Costello and the Attractions	7	50	–	–	–	21	–	–	–	17	–	50	Gold (UK)
1982	Imperial Bedroom: Released: 2 July 1982; Label: F-Beat/Columbia	Elvis Costello and the Attractions	6	49	27	–	–	45	18	37	–	30	–	30	
1983	Punch the Clock: Released: 5 August 1983; Label: F-Beat/Columbia	Elvis Costello and the Attractions	3	22	26	–	–	27	18	6	–	9	–	24	
1984	Goodbye Cruel World: Released: 18 June 1984; Label: F-Beat/Columbia	Elvis Costello and the Attractions	10	53	55	–	52	–	–	32	–	20	–	35	Silver (UK)
1986	King of America: Released: 21 February 1986; Label: Demon/Columbia	The Costello Show featuring the Attractions and Confederates	11	67	49	–	41	40	–	21	–	12	–	39	Silver (UK)
1986	Blood & Chocolate: Released: 15 September 1986; Label: Demon/Columbia	Elvis Costello and the Attractions	16	–	79	–	–	19	–	–	–	26	–	84	Gold (UK)
1989	Spike: Released: 6 February 1989; Label: Warner Bros.	Elvis Costello	5	26	28	–	61	19	–	34	–	13	–	32	Gold (UK); Gold (US)
1991	Mighty Like a Rose: Released: 14 May 1991; Label: Warner Bros.	Elvis Costello	5	37	42	–	39	47	11	38	–	23	35	55	Silver (UK)
1991	G.B.H.: Released: July 1991; Label: Demon	Richard Harvey & Elvis Costello	–	–	–	–	–	–	–	–	–	–	–	–	
1993	The Juliet Letters: Released: 19 January 1993; Label: Warner Bros.	Elvis Costello and the Brodsky Quartet	18	106	67	–	39	54	–	–	–	–	–	125	
1994	Brutal Youth: Released: 8 March 1994; Label: Warner Bros.	Elvis Costello	2	55	28	–	30	54	–	48	–	14	40	34	Silver (UK)
1995	Kojak Variety: Released: 9 May 1995; Label: Warner Bros.	Elvis Costello	21	102	58	–	60	74	–	–	–	23	–	102	
1995	Jake's Progress: Released: 6 November 1995; Label: Demon/Rykodisc	Richard Harvey and Elvis Costello	–	–	–	–	–	–	–	–	–	–	–	–	
1996	All This Useless Beauty: Released: 14 May 1996; Label: Warner Bros.	Elvis Costello and the Attractions	28	98	28	–	77	83	38	–	–	24	–	53	
1998	Painted from Memory: Released: 29 September 1998; Label: Mercury/PolyGram	Elvis Costello and Burt Bacharach	32	26	58	–	69	33	29	38	–	18	–	78	Silver (UK)
2001	For the Stars: 10 April 2001; Deutsche Grammophon	Anne Sofie von Otter Meets Elvis Costello	67	–	–	–	–	80	33	–	–	25	–	–	
2002	When I Was Cruel: Released: 23 April 2002; Label: Island	Elvis Costello	17	34	–	–	15	34	17	–	–	56	58	20	Silver (UK)
2003	North: Released: 23 September 2003; Label: Deutsche Grammophon	Elvis Costello	44	72	–	–	26	56	25	–	–	25	–	57	
2004	The Delivery Man: Released: 21 September 2004; Label: Lost Highway	Elvis Costello and the Imposters	73	89	–	–	100	65	34	–	–	58	–	40	
2004	Il Sogno: Released: 21 September 2004; Label: Deutsche Grammophon	Elvis Costello (Note: Elvis Costello is the composer of this orchestral score for ballet. The work is performed by the London Symphony Orchestra conducted by Michael Tilson Thomas.)	–	–	–	–	–	–	–	–	–	–	–	–	
2006	The River in Reverse: Released: 6 June 2006; Label: Verve Forecast	Elvis Costello and Allen Toussaint	97	111	–	–	–	61	31	–	–	40	–	103	
2008	Momofuku: Released: 22 April 2008; Label: Lost Highway	Elvis Costello and the Imposters	112	–	–	–	98	–	34	–	–	–	–	59	
2009	Secret, Profane & Sugarcane: Released: 9 June 2009; Label: Hear Music/Universal	Elvis Costello	71	73	13	–	82	–	–	–	88	45	–	13	
2010	National Ransom: Released: 25 October 2010; Label: Hear Music/Universal	Elvis Costello	71	158	69	–	116	–	–	–	86	–	–	39	
2013	Wise Up Ghost: Released: 17 September 2013; Label: Blue Note	Elvis Costello and the Roots	28	40	–	30	–	35	26	–	66	–	12	16	
2018	Look Now: Released: 12 October 2018; Label: Concord	Elvis Costello and the Imposters	14	–	62	33	–	35	–	–	17	40	37	46	
2020	Hey Clockface: Released: 30 October 2020; Label: Concord	Elvis Costello	39	174	–	–	–	–	–	–	–	–	88	–	
2022	The Boy Named If: Released: 14 January 2022; Label: EMI	Elvis Costello and the Imposters	6	–	–	–	–	–	–	–	–	–	15	200	
2024	The Coward Brothers: Released: 21 November 2024; Label: New West Records	The Coward Brothers	–	–	–	–	–	–	–	–	–	–	–	–	

=== Live albums ===
Year	Title	Chart position
Year	Title	US
1978	Live at the El Mocambo: Date: 1978 (Promotional Release) / 12 October 1993 (Re-issue) / 29 September 2009 (Re-issue); Label: Columbia (Canada) (1978) / Rykodisc (1993) / Hip-O (2009)	–
1995	Deep Dead Blue: Date: 14 August 1995; Label: Nonesuch	–
1996	Costello & Nieve: Date: 3 December 1996; Label: Warner Bros.	–
2006	My Flame Burns Blue: Date: 28 February 2006; Label: Deutsche Grammophon	188
2010	Live at Hollywood High: Date: 12 January 2010; Label: Hip-O	–
2012	The Return of the Spectacular Spinning Songbook: Date: 2 April 2012; Label: Universal Music Enterprises	–

=== Compilation albums ===
Year	Title	Chart position						Certifications (sales thresholds)
Year	Title	UK	AUS	CAN	IRL	NZ	US	Certifications (sales thresholds)
1980	Taking Liberties (US only): Date: November 1980; Label: Columbia	–	–	61	–	–	28	
1980	Ten Bloody Marys & Ten How's Your Fathers (UK only): Date: 7 November 1980; Label: F-Beat	–	–	–	–	–	–	Silver (UK)
1985	The Man – The Best of Elvis Costello: Date: April 1985; Label: Demon	8	152	–	–	31	–	
1985	The Best of Elvis Costello and the Attractions: Label: Columbia	–	–	–	–	–	116	Platinum (US)
1987	Out of Our Idiot (UK only): Date: 4 December 1987; Label: Demon	–	–	–	–	–	–	Silver (UK)
1989	Girls Girls Girls: Date: October 1989; Label: Demon/Columbia	67	–	–	–	–	–	
1990	The Best of Elvis Costello and the Attractions	–	–	–	–	–	–	
1994	The Very Best of Elvis Costello and The Attractions 1977–86: Date: 25 October 1994; Label: Rykodisc/Demon	57	124	–	–	–	–	
1997	Extreme Honey: Date: 21 October 1997; Label: Warner Bros.	–	–	–	–	–	–	
1999	The Very Best of Elvis Costello: Date: 21 September 1999; Label: PolyGram	4	168	–	–	–	–	Gold (UK)
2002	Cruel Smile: Date: 1 October 2002; Label: Universal Music Group	–	–	–	–	–	180	
2007	The Best of Elvis Costello: The First 10 Years: Date: 1 May 2007; Label: Hip-O	–	–	–	68	–	110	
2007	Rock and Roll Music: Date: 1 May 2007; Label: Hip-O	–	–	–	–	–	–	
2010	Pomp & Pout: The Universal Years: Date: 24 August 2010; Label: Hip-O	–	–	–	–	–	–	
2012	In Motion Pictures: Date: 19 November 2012; Label: Universal Music Group	–	–	–	–	–	–	
2015	Unfaithful Music and Soundtrack Album: Date: 23 October 2015; Label: Universal Music Group	96	–	–	–	–	–	
2023	The Songs of Bacharach & Costello (with Burt Bacharach): Date: 3 March 2023; Label: Universal Music Group	–	–	–	–	–	–	

=== Boxed sets ===
Year	Title
1993	2½ Years: Date: 15 October 1993; Label: Rykodisc
2003	Singles, Volume 1 (UK only): Date: 27 October 2003; Label: Edsel
2003	Singles, Volume 2 (UK only): Date: 27 October 2003; Label: Edsel
2003	Singles, Volume 3 (UK only): Date: 27 October 2003; Label: Edsel
2020	Armed Forces: Super Deluxe Edition (vinyl & digital only): Date: 6 November 2020; Label: Universal
2024	King of America & Other Realms (CD only): Date: 1 November 2024; Label: Universal

== EPs ==
Year	Title	Chart position		Notes
Year	Title	UK	IRL	Notes
1989	Baby Plays Around	65	27	solo
2010	National Ransack	–	–	solo
2018	Regarde Maintenant	–	–	with the Imposters
2019	Purse	–	–	with the Imposters
2022	The Resurrection of Rust	–	–	with the Imposters and Allan Mayes

== Singles ==
The following is a list of all Costello's commercially available singles. The key for the Artist Credit below is as follows:

- Elvis Costello – (EC);
- Elvis Costello & the Attractions – (EC+ATT);
- Elvis Costello & George Jones – (EC+GJ);
- Elvis Costello & the Attractions with the Royal Philharmonic Orchestra – (EC+ATT+RPO);
- The Imposter – (IMP);
- The Costello Show – (TCS);
- The MacManus Gang – (TMG),
- The Coward Brothers – (TCB);
- Jimmy Cliff & Elvis Costello & the Attractions – (JC+EC+ATT);
- Elvis Costello & the Brodsky Quartet – (EC+BQ);
- Elvis Costello and Burt Bacharach – (EC+BB);
- Elvis Costello & The Imposters – (EC+IMP)
- The Lupotones (Vocal refrain by Elvis Costello) – (LUP)
- Elvis Costello & The Roots – (EC+ROOTS)
- Elvis Costello & Joker Out – (EC+ JO)

Year	Title	Artist credit	Chart position									Notes	Album
Year	Title	Artist credit	UK	AUS	CAN	IRL	NZ	US	US AAA	US MSR	US Alt	Notes	Album
1977	"Less Than Zero"	EC	–	–	–	–	–	–	–	–	–		My Aim Is True
1977	"Alison"	EC	–	–	–	–	–	–	–	–	–		My Aim Is True
1977	"(The Angels Wanna Wear My) Red Shoes"	EC	–	–	–	–	–	–	–	–	–		My Aim Is True
1977	"Watching the Detectives"	EC	15	35	60	–	–	108	–	–	–	Did not appear on UK editions of My Aim Is True.	My Aim Is True
1978	"(I Don't Want to Go to) Chelsea"	EC+ATT	16	93	–	12	–	–	–	–	–	Did not appear on US editions of This Year's Model.	This Year's Model
1978	"This Year's Girl"	EC+ATT	–	–	–	–	–	–	–	–	–	US release only	This Year's Model
1978	"Pump It Up"	EC+ATT	24	55	–	–	–	–	–	–	–		This Year's Model
1978	"Stranger in the House"	EC+GJ	–	–	–	–	–	–	–	–	–	Packaged with the first 1,000 copies of This Year's Model.	My Very Special Guests
1978	"Radio Radio"	EC+ATT	29	93	–	–	–	–	–	–	–	Did not appear on UK editions of This Year's Model.	This Year's Model
1978	"(What's So Funny 'Bout) Peace, Love and Understanding" b/w /"My Funny Valentine" (non-album track)	EC+ATT	–	–	–	–	–	–	–	–	–	Cover single given out free at a Valentine's Day concert. Also, it didn't appear on UK editions of Armed Forces.	Armed Forces
1978	"Talking in the Dark" b/w "Wednesday Week"	EC+ATT	–	–	–	–	–	–	–	–	–	Christmas single given out free at concerts.	Non-album single
1979	"Oliver's Army"	EC+ATT	2	24	–	4	25	–	–	–	–		Armed Forces
1979	"Accidents Will Happen"	EC+ATT	28	–	–	–	–	101	–	–	–		Armed Forces
1980	"I Can't Stand Up for Falling Down"	EC+ATT	4	–	–	14	–	–	–	–	–		Get Happy!!
1980	"High Fidelity"	EC+ATT	30	–	–	–	–	–	–	–	–		Get Happy!!
1980	"New Amsterdam"	EC	36	–	–	–	–	–	–	–	–	The Attractions played on almost all of Costello's singles from 1978 to 1984. But Costello did all the instruments on "New Amsterdam".	Get Happy!!
1980	"Clubland"	EC+ATT	60	–	–	–	–	–	–	–	–		Trust
1981	"From a Whisper to a Scream"	EC+ATT	–	–	–	–	–	–	–	46	–		Trust
1981	"Watch Your Step"	EC+ATT	–	–	–	–	–	–	–	–	–	US release only	Trust
1981	"Good Year for the Roses"	EC+ATT	6	34	–	5	–	–	–	–	–		Almost Blue
1981	"Sweet Dreams"	EC+ATT	42	–	–	–	–	–	–	–	–		Almost Blue
1982	"I'm Your Toy" b/w "Cry, Cry, Cry" and "Wondering" (non-album tracks, EC+ATT)	EC+ATT+RPO	51	–	–	–	–	–	–	–	–		Almost Blue
1982	"You Little Fool"	EC+ATT	52	–	–	–	–	–	–	–	–		Imperial Bedroom
1982	"Man Out of Time"	EC+ATT	58	–	–	–	–	–	–	–	–		Imperial Bedroom
1982	"From Head to Toe" b/w "The World of Broken Hearts"	EC+ATT	43	–	–	–	–	–	–	–	–		Non-album single
1982	"Party Party"	EC+ATT	48	–	–	–	–	–	–	–	–		Party Party Soundtrack
1983	"Pills and Soap"	IMP	16	–	–	–	–	–	–	–	–		Punch the Clock
1983	"Everyday I Write the Book"	EC+ATT	28	40	40	23	20	36	–	33	–		Punch the Clock
1983	"Let Them All Talk" b/w "The Flirting Kind" (non-album track)	EC+ATT	59	–	–	–	–	–	–	–	–		Punch the Clock
1984	"Peace in Our Time" b/w "Withered and Died" (non-album track)	IMP	48	–	–	–	–	–	–	–	–		Goodbye Cruel World
1984	"I Wanna Be Loved" / "Turning the Town Red" (non-album track)	EC+ATT	25	–	–	11	–	–	–	–	–	"I Wanna Be Loved" / "Turning the Town Red" was tracked as a double A-side in the UK, with both sides charting. "Turning The Town Red" did not initially appear on ''Goodbye Cruel World'', although it has been added as a bonus track to some CD reissues of this album.	Goodbye Cruel World
1984	"The Only Flame in Town"	EC+ATT	71	–	–	–	–	56	–	44	–		Goodbye Cruel World
1985	"Green Shirt"	EC+ATT	68	–	–	–	–	–	–	–	–		The Man – The Best of Elvis Costello
1985	"The People's Limousine" b/w "They'll Never Take Her Love from Me"	TCB	–	–	–	–	–	–	–	–	–		Non-album single
1986	"Don't Let Me Be Misunderstood"	TCS	33	81	–	22	–	–	–	38	–		King of America
1986	"Seven-Day Weekend" (with Jimmy Cliff)	JC+EC+ATT	–	–	–	–	–	–	–	–	–		Club Paradise
1986	"Lovable"	TCS	–	–	–	–	–	–	–	–	–	US release only	King of America
1986	"Tokyo Storm Warning" b/w "Black Sails in the Sunset"	EC+ATT	73	–	–	–	–	–	–	–	–		Blood and Chocolate
1986	"I Want You"	EC+ATT	79	–	–	–	–	–	–	–	–		Blood and Chocolate
1987	"Blue Chair"	EC	94	–	–	–	–	–	–	–	–		Blood and Chocolate
1987	"A Town Called Big Nothing"	TMG	–	–	–	–	–	–	–	–	–		Non-album single
1989	"Veronica"	EC	31	27	64	22	16	19	–	10	1		Spike
1989	"...This Town..."	EC	–	123	–	–	–	–	–	41	4		Spike
1991	"The Other Side of Summer"	EC	43	96	72	–	–	–	–	40	1		Mighty Like a Rose
1991	"So Like Candy"	EC	–	129	–	–	–	–	–	–	–		Mighty Like a Rose
1993	"Jacksons, Monk & Rowe"	EC+BQ	–	–	–	–	–	–	–	–	73		The Juliet Letters
1994	"Sulky Girl"	EC	22	162	–	–	–	–	–	–	–	Although the Attractions played on "Sulky Girl" and "13 Steps Lead Down", these tracks were credited simply to Elvis Costello.	Brutal Youth
1994	"13 Steps Lead Down"	EC	59	137	–	–	–	115	–	–	6	Although the Attractions played on "Sulky Girl" and "13 Steps Lead Down", these tracks were credited simply to Elvis Costello.	Brutal Youth
1994	"You Tripped at Every Step"	EC+ATT	83	–	–	–	–	–	–	–	–		Brutal Youth
1994	"London's Brilliant Parade"	EC+ATT	48	–	–	–	–	–	–	–	–		Brutal Youth
1996	"It's Time"	EC+ATT	58	–	–	–	–	–	–	–	–		All This Useless Beauty
1996	"Little Atoms"	EC+ATT	95	–	–	–	–	–	–	–	–		All This Useless Beauty
1996	"The Other End of the Telescope"	EC+ATT	96	–	–	–	–	–	–	–	–		All This Useless Beauty
1996	"Distorted Angel"	EC+ATT	–	–	–	–	–	–	–	–	–		All This Useless Beauty
1996	"All This Useless Beauty"	EC+ATT	96	–	–	–	–	–	–	–	–		All This Useless Beauty
1996	"You Bowed Down"	EC+ATT	–	–	–	–	–	–	8	–	–	US release only	All This Useless Beauty
1999	"Toledo"	EC+BB	72	–	–	–	–	–	–	–	–		Painted from Memory
1999	"She"	EC	19	–	–	–	–	–	–	–	–		Notting Hill: Music from the Motion Picture
2002	"Tear Off Your Own Head (It's a Doll Revolution)"	EC	58	–	–	–	–	–	11	–	–	The backing musicians on "Tear Off Your Own Head" and "45" were Steve Nieve, Davey Faragher, and Pete Thomas, later to be collectively billed as "The Imposters". However, these releases are credited solely to Costello.	When I Was Cruel
2002	"45"	EC	92	–	–	–	–	–	–	–	–		When I Was Cruel
2004	"Monkey to Man"	EC+IMP	–	–	–	–	–	–	10	–	–		The Delivery Man
2005	"Brilliant Mistake"	EC	–	–	–	–	–	–	–	–	–	"Brilliant Mistake" was released as a UK single in 2005, 19 years after the track first appeared on the album King of America. Though the album was credited to The Costello Show, the single release was credited to Elvis Costello.	King of America
2008	"No Hiding Place"	EC+IMP	–	–	–	–	–	–	26	–	–		Momofuku
2008	"Go Away"	EC+IMP	–	–	–	–	–	–	–	–	–		Momofuku
2009	"Complicated Shadows"	EC	–	–	–	–	–	–	15	–	–		Secret, Profane & Sugarcane
2010	"A Slow Drag with Josephine"	LUP	–	–	–	–	–	–	–	–	–	"A Slow Drag With Josephine" was issued as a limited edition 78 rpm 10" single. For this single release, the design conceit was to emulate the look of a real 1930s 78 rpm single, and accordingly the artist credit on the label was given as "The Lupotones (Vocal refrain by Elvis Costello)"	National Ransom
2010	"Jimmie Standing in the Rain"	LUP	–	–	–	–	–	–	–	–	–	"Jimmie Standing in the Rain" was issued as a limited edition 78 rpm 10" single. For this single release, the design conceit was to emulate the look of a real 1930s 78 rpm single, and accordingly the artist credit on the label was given as "The Lupotones (Vocal refrain by Elvis Costello)"	National Ransom
2013	"Walk Us Uptown"	EC+ROOTS	–	–	–	–	–	–	–	–	–		Wise Up Ghost
2017	"Bright Blue Times"	IMP	–	–	–	–	–	–	–	–	–		Non-album singles
2017	"American Tune" b/w "Lucky Dog"	IMP	–	–	–	–	–	–	–	–	–		Non-album singles
2018	"Someone Else's Heart"	EC	–	–	–	–	–	–	–	–	–		Non-album singles
2018	"Unwanted Number"	EC+IMP	–	–	–	–	–	–	8	–	–		Look Now
2018	"Under Lime"	EC+IMP	–	–	–	–	–	–	–	–	–		Look Now
2020	"No Flag"	EC	–	–	–	–	–	–	39	–	–		Hey Clockface
2020	"Hetty O'Hara Confidential"	EC	–	–	–	–	–	–	–	–	–		Hey Clockface
2020	"We Are All Cowards Now"	EC	–	–	–	–	–	–	–	–	–		Hey Clockface
2020	"Hey Clockface / How Can You Face Me?"	EC	–	–	–	–	–	–	–	–	–		Hey Clockface
2020	"Newspaper Pane"	EC	–	–	–	–	–	–	–	–	–		Hey Clockface
2021	"Magnificent Hurt"	EC+IMP	–	–	–	–	–	–	10	–	–		The Boy Named If
2023	"New Wave"	EC+ JO	–	–	–	–	–	–	–	–	–		Non-album single

== Contributions ==
=== Studio ===
Year	Title	Album	Notes
1979	"Crawling to the U.S.A."	Americathon	solo
1984	"Walking on Thin Ice"	Every Man Has a Woman	solo Yoko Ono cover
1984	"Really Mystified"	Sometimes a Great Notion	solo Merseybeats cover
1986	"Seven-Day Weekend"	Club Paradise	with Jimmy Cliff and the Attractions
1986	"The End of the Rainbow"	It's a Live-In World	solo Richard Thompson cover
1987	"Big Nothing"	Straight to Hell	as The Macmanus Gang, later released as the single "A Town Called Big Nothing"
1991	"Ship of Fools"	Deadicated	solo Grateful Dead cover
1991	"Mischievous Ghost"	Bringing It All Back Home	with Mary Coughlan
1992	"May 17th"	Ferrington Guitars	solo, some sources say 1993
1994	"Sally Sue Brown"	Adios Amigo: A Tribute to Arthur Alexander	solo Arthur Alexander cover
1994	"But Not for Me"	The Glory of Gershwin	solo George & Ira Gershwin cover
1994	"Full Force Gale"	No Prima Donna: The Songs of Van Morrison	solo Van Morrison cover
1996	"My Dark Life"	Songs in the Key of X	with Brian Eno
1996	"The Night Before Larry Was Stretched"	Common Ground	solo traditional cover
1996	"What Do I Do Now?"	Volume 17: Fifth Birthday Bumper Bonanza!	solo
1997	"Lost in the Stars"	September Songs: The Music of Kurt Weill	Maxwell Anderson & Kurt Weill cover
1998	"Long Journey Home (Anthem)"	Long Journey Home	with Anúna
1998	"My Mood Swings"	The Big Lebowski	solo
1999	"She"	Notting Hill	solo Charles Aznavour cover
1999	"I'll Never Fall in Love Again"	Austin Powers: The Spy Who Shagged Me	Burt Bacharach & Hal David cover with Bacharach
1999	"Sleepless Nights"	Return of the Grievous Angel: A Tribute to Gram Parson	solo Gram Parsons cover
2000	"La Paloma"	La Paloma #4	Sebastián Iradier cover with Patric Catani & Sir John Henry
2000	"You Stole My Bell"	The Family Man	solo
2001	"Egypt"	Labour of Love: The Music of Nick Lowe	solo Nick Lowe cover
2004	"Let's Misbehave"	De-Lovely	solo Cole Porter cover
2006	"Little Boxes"	Weeds: Volume 2	solo Malvina Reynolds cover
2007	"Edith and the Kingpin"	A Tribute to Joni Mitchell	solo Joni Mitchell cover
2007	"Ring of Fire"	Anchored in Love: A Tribute to June Carter Cash	solo Johnny Cash cover
2007	"Beautiful"	House M.D.	solo Christina Aguilera cover
2010	"Kiss Like Your Kiss"	True Blood	with Lucinda Williams
2012	"License to Kill"	Chimes of Freedom: The Songs of Bob Dylan	solo Bob Dylan cover
2012	"Quiet About It"	Quiet About It: A Tribute to Jesse Winchester	solo Jesse Winchester cover
2013	"It Had to Be You"	Boardwalk Empire Volume 2: Music from the HBO Original Series: Label: ABKCO	solo Isham Jones & Gus Kahn cover
2014	"I Surrender Dear"	Boardwalk Empire Volume 3: Music from the HBO Original Series: Label: ABKCO	solo Harry Barris & Gordon Clifford cover
2016	"Back Stabbers"	Vinyl: The Essentials – Best of Season 1	solo O'Jays cover
2018	"I'll Still Love You"	Forever Words	solo song based on poetry by Johnny Cash
2021	"Maud Gone Wrong"	Songs from Quarantine: Vol. 1	solo
2022	"And Your Bird Can Sing/The Birds Will Be Singing"	For the Birds, Vol II	solo cover medley

=== Live/alternate takes ===
Year	Title	Album	Notes
1977	"Less Than Zero"	A Bunch of Stiff Records (UK only): Date: 1 April 1977	alternate mix
1978	"I Just Don't Know What to Do with Myself" and "Miracle Man"	Live Stiffs Live: Label: Stiff/Arista	live with the Attractions
1991	"Days"	Until the End of the World: Label: Warner Bros.	later re-recorded for Kojak Variety
1994	"Deep Dark Truthful Mirror"	The Unplugged Collection, Volume One: Label: Warner Bros.	live with the Rude 5
2006	"The Butcher's Boy" and "Ommie Wise Part 1 & 2 (What Lewis Did Last...)	The Harry Smith Project: Anthology of American Folk Music	live with various artists
2015	"Please Mr. Kennedy" and "Which Side Are You On?"	Another Day, Another Time: Celebrating the Music of "Inside Llewyn Davis"	live with various artists

== Other work ==
=== Albums which credit Costello as a featured artist ===
Year	Title	Artist credit	Chart positions			
Year	Title	Artist credit	UK	NLD	NOR	SWE
1993	Now Ain't the Time for Your Tears: Label: MCA	by Wendy James – all songs composed by Elvis Costello	43	–	–	–
1997	Terror & Magnificence: Label: Argo	John Harle featuring Elvis Costello, Sarah Leonard, and Andy Sheppard	–	–	–	
2005	Piano Jazz: McPartland/Costello: Label: Jazz Alliance	Marian McPartland with guest Elvis Costello	–	–	–	–

=== Guest appearances ===
Year	Title	Track(s)
1989	A Black & White Night Live by Roy Orbison	various songs
1991	The Bells of Dublin by the Chieftains	"St. Stephen's Day Murders"
1992	Weird Nightmare: Meditations on Mingus by Hal Willner	"Weird Nightmare"
1998	The Rugrats Movie by various artists	"I Throw My Toys Around" by No Doubt
1999	The Sweetest Punch by Bill Frisell	various songs
2001	Songs from a History of Britain by John Harle	various songs
2008	Acid Tongue by Jenny Lewis	"Carpetbaggers"
2009	Sheffield Streets by Amy Allison	"Monsters of the Id"
2022	Now & Forever by Rita Wilson	"Fire"

== Remixes ==
=== Albums ===
Year	Title	Notes
2021	Spanish Model: Released: 10 September 2021; Label: Rough Trade	Spanish-language remix

=== EPs ===
Year	Title	Notes
2021	La Face de Pendule à Coucou: Released: March 2021; Concord	French-language remix

== with the New Basement Tapes ==
Year	Title
2014	Lost on the River: The New Basement Tapes: Label: Island Records / Harvest Records
