= Costello Album =

The McCartney/MacManus Collaboration (Costello Album)

Compilation album by Paul McCartney and Elvis Costello
- Released: Unofficially, in 1998
- Recorded: 1987–1996
- Studio: Hog Hill Mill, Sussex, England (1987); Burbank, California (1989); London, England (1995); Los Angeles, California (1996)
- Genre: Rock
- Length: 55:57
- Label: Vigotone

Paul McCartney and Elvis Costello collaborative chronology
All This Useless Beauty (1996)	The McCartney/MacManus Collaboration (Costello Album) (1998)

The Costello Album, also known as The McCartney/MacManus Collaboration, is an unofficial album by English singer-songwriter Paul McCartney, released in 1988 by Vigotone Records. The album features work from his 1987–88 songwriting collaboration with Elvis Costello, including demo recordings made jointly by McCartney and Costello, other demos made individually, live performances by Costello, and two duo live performances taken from a 1995 benefit concert at the Royal College of Music. A planned album credited to both was abandoned after initial sessions were unsatisfactory. The duo demo recordings were unknown to the public until 1998, when they first surfaced on The McCartney/MacManus Collaboration. Both the duo and full-band demos would later appear on the 2017 deluxe edition reissue of McCartney's Flowers in the Dirt.

Studio recordings of many of these songs have appeared officially on albums by either McCartney or Costello. "Back on My Feet" was the first collaboration to be released officially, as a B-side to McCartney's 1987 single "Once Upon a Long Ago". McCartney went on to release his versions of "My Brave Face", "You Want Her Too", "Don't Be Careless Love", and "That Day Is Done" on Flowers in the Dirt in 1989, followed by "Mistress and Maid" and "The Lovers That Never Were" on Off the Ground in 1993. Costello issued his versions of "Veronica" and "Pads, Paws and Claws" on Spike in 1989, "So Like Candy" and "Playboy to a Man" on Mighty Like a Rose in 1991, and "Shallow Grave" on All This Useless Beauty in 1996. Demos of these songs have appeared as bonus tracks to the above albums, on bonus discs to the Costello Rhino reissues, and on the bonus discs to the 2017 reissue of Flowers in the Dirt.

== Track listing ==
Adapted from AllMusic.

All tracks are written by Declan MacManus (Elvis Costello) and Paul McCartney, except where noted.

Paul McCartney and Elvis Costello demos
No.	Title	Length
1.	"The Lovers That Never Were"	3:58
2.	"Twenty Fine Fingers"	2:26
3.	"Tommy's Coming Home"	4:08
4.	"So Like Candy"	3:28
5.	"You Want Her Too"	2:36
6.	"Playboy to a Man"	2:52
7.	"Don't Be Careless Love"	3:35
8.	"My Brave Face"	2:31

Elvis Costello demo
No.	Title	Length
9.	"Veronica" (MacManus, McCartney, Cait O'Riordan)	3:01

Paul McCartney and Elvis Costello live
No.	Title	Length
10.	"One After 909" (John Lennon, McCartney)	2:52
11.	"Mistress and Maid"	3:02

Elvis Costello live
No.	Title	Length
12.	"Pads, Paws and Claws"	3:57
13.	"You Want Her Too"	2:29
14.	"Shallow Grave"	2:45

Paul McCartney and Elvis Costello demo
No.	Title	Length
15.	"My Brave Face"	1:00

Paul McCartney demos
No.	Title	Length
16.	"That Day Is Done"	1:29
17.	"Back on My Feet"	4:23

Elvis Costello demos
No.	Title	Length
18.	"Step Inside Love" (Lennon, McCartney)	2:39
19.	"You've Got to Hide Your Love Away" (Lennon, McCartney)	2:46
