= You Bowed Down =

1991 song by Roger McGuinn, written by Elvis Costello

Song by Roger McGuinn

from the album Back from Rio
- Released: January 8, 1991
- Genre: Jangle pop
- Length: 3:52
- Label: Arista
- Songwriter: Elvis Costello
- Producers: David Cole; Roger McGuinn

"You Bowed Down" is a song written by Elvis Costello, first released by Roger McGuinn on his album Back from Rio. Costello recorded his own version of the song for his 1996 album All This Useless Beauty.

Having been acquaintances with Costello since the 1980s, McGuinn asked him to contribute a song to his next solo album. Costello then sent back "You Bowed Down" with detailed instructions on how McGuinn should perform the vocals. After McGuinn's version was released, Costello decided to revisit the song for a project originally intended to be a collection of songs Costello gave to other musicians. Costello's version, performed with the Attractions, reworked the middle-eight to more closely mirror Costello's original arrangement. It was released as a single in the US in 1996.

Both versions have attracted critical acclaim and Costello continues to perform the song intermittently live.

== Background ==
After meeting at a show in New Orleans in the mid-1980s, Roger McGuinn and Elvis Costello first collaborated on the latter's 1989 album, Spike, which was produced by mutual friend T-Bone Burnett. In 1989, Costello explained, "Roger McGuinn ... wasn't originally scheduled to be on the record, but we met him while we were recording—and T-Bone [Burnett, one of Costello's producers] had met him on Dylan's Rolling Thunder tour in the 70s." McGuinn stated that he found Costello to be "amazingly intellectual", noting, "It's hard to follow him sometimes. He just pops around from one idea to another."

When McGuinn set out to record his 1991 album Back from Rio, he asked Costello to contribute a song. McGuinn recalls, "He sent it to me from Ireland with a three-page letter saying what it was about, and told me he wanted me to sing it like a combination of 'My Back Pages' and 'Positively Fourth Street.'" McGuinn then recorded the song with Dylanesque vocals (with Costello contributing backing vocals) and presented the final version to Costello:

Later I played it for him at Tom Petty's house in Los Angeles and he just looked at the floor, kind of frowning, until it was over. Then he walked over and shook my hand -- like, 'Yeah, that's okay.'

As of 2011, Costello and McGuinn remain acquaintances. The latter commented, "We had a period a couple of years ago when we kept bumping into each other as one of us was checking into and the other out of, hotels then we kept meeting in Airport lounges; no one else in the whole music industry, just Elvis Costello. I've known Elvis for a lot of years and we can talk for hours; or at least he can talk for hours and I listen."

== Critical reception ==
"You Bowed Down" saw positive reception from music writers of the period. The LA Times wrote that the song is "echoing the bitter majesty of the Byrds doing Dylan." The Washington Post, who described the song as a "bitter accusation", named it "one of the standout tracks" from Back to Rio. The New York Times dubbed it "psychologically knotty".

== Elvis Costello & The Attractions version ==
"You Bowed Down"

Single by Elvis Costello & The Attractions

from the album All This Useless Beauty
- B-side: "Almost Ideal Eyes"
- Released: September 17, 1996
- Genre: Jangle pop
- Length: 4:55
- Label: Warner Bros.
- Songwriter: Elvis Costello
- Producers: Geoff Emerick; Elvis Costello

Elvis Costello & The Attractions singles chronology
"All This Useless Beauty" (1996)	"You Bowed Down" (1996)	"Toledo" (1999)

"You Bowed Down" was recorded by Elvis Costello and the Attractions in 1996 for his seventeenth studio album All This Useless Beauty. It was released as a single in the US, reaching number eight on the Billboard Adult Alternative Songs chart.

=== Background ===
Costello chose to record his own version of "You Bowed Down" on All This Useless Beauty, as the album was originally intended to be a collection of Costello compositions recorded by other artists. For "You Bowed Down", Costello specifically wanted to restore his original arrangement for the song's middle-eight, which was altered in the McGuinn recording to be in 4/4 time alongside the rest of the song. He explained:

Roger McGuinn's producer prevailed on him to straighten out the middle of 'You Bowed Down' and make it into 4/4 time which, to my mind, completely negated the whole point of that section of that song. Even though I loved everything else about his version, and I even sang on it, that disappointed me. I wanted to do that myself, to go off into space and do a little solo like he did in 'Chestnut Mare' with The Byrds. I just wanted to hear that, selfish really.

When Costello sought to record the song with the Attractions, he initially dabbled with a Sonic Youth-esque arrangement, but determined this style "didn't work" and that the song "wanted to have a 12-string on it." Costello singled out "You Bowed Down" along with "It's Time" as songs where the Attractions are "most effective" on the album.

Costello's original demo that he recorded for McGuinn later appeared as a bonus track on All This Useless Beauty.

=== Critical reception ===
In a 1996 review, Q wrote, "'You Bowed Down' apes The Byrds' high lonesome sound more accurately and with a sharper wit than Jeff Lynne and Tom Petty could manage in a month of Rickenbacker workshops". The Washington Post dubbed it "a rousing folk-rocker about moral compromise", while the Bergen County Record noted that the band "proves its mettle" on the song's Byrdsy arrangement. The New Musical Express praised how Costello "pull[s] off convincingly Byrdsian moves on the delightful and mellifluous paisley piece 'You Bowed Down.'" Entertainment Weekly wrote, "The tenderly spat opener, 'The Other End of the Telescope,' and especially the Dylanesque 'You Bowed Down' rank with Costello’s finest put-down songs."

=== Live history ===
"You Bowed Down" has appeared intermittently in Costello's live setlist since its release. A live version performed by Costello and Attractions keyboardist Steve Nieve was released on the 1996 live album Costello & Nieve. Costello and the Attractions performed "You Bowed Down" on The Tonight Show With Jay Leno in August 1996; by this point, Costello, embittered by his disputes with bassist Bruce Thomas, changed the chorus lyric from "You bowed down" to "I should never have walked over that bridge I burned," referring to his reunion with the Attractions.

=== Personnel ===
Elvis Costello & The Attractions

- Elvis Costello – vocals, guitar
- Steve Nieve – piano, keyboards
- Bruce Thomas – bass
- Pete Thomas – drums

Production

- Geoff Emerick – producer, engineer, mixing
- Elvis Costello – producer
- Jon Jacobs – engineer, mixing
- Bob Ludwig – mastering
- Dave Zamitt – recording and mixing on "Basement Kiss"

=== Charts ===
Chart (1996)	Peak position
US Billboard Adult Alternative Songs	8
