= List of Paul McCartney musical contributions and appearances =

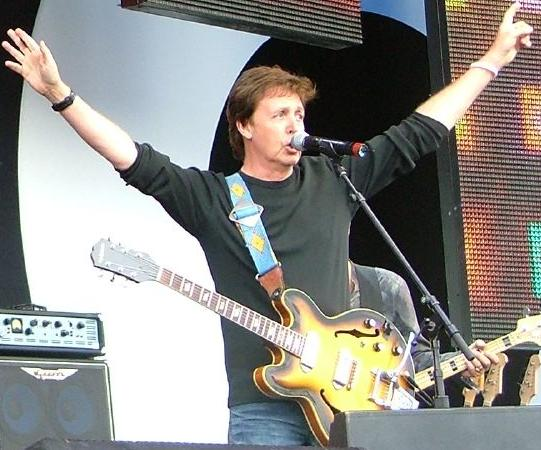
McCartney at Live 8 in 2005

This article presents all the contributions and appearances of Paul McCartney as a solo artist and as a member of Wings.

== Appearances ==
- Live and Let Die Original Motion Picture Soundtrack (1973) – 1 song
  - The soundtrack album from the James Bond film includes the title song performed by Paul McCartney & Wings.
- Concerts for the People of Kampuchea (1981) – 6 songs
  - A live album recorded at the Hammersmith Odeon, London in December 1979 to benefit Cambodian refugees. The concert and album were organised by McCartney and included live performances by both his band, Wings, and his "supergroup", Rockestra. Also featured on the album were live cuts by The Who, The Pretenders, Elvis Costello, Rockpile, Queen, The Clash, and Ian Dury & The Blockheads. The McCartney tracks included on the album are as follows:
    - "Got to Get You Into My Life" (by Paul McCartney & Wings)
    - "Every Night" (by Paul McCartney & Wings)
    - "Coming Up" (by Paul McCartney & Wings)
    - "Lucille" (by Rockestra)
    - "Let It Be" (by Rockestra)
    - "Rockestra Theme" (by Rockestra)
- It's a Live-In World (1986) – 1 song
  - British various artists album to benefit The Anti-Heroin Project. In addition to the McCartney track, the album also contains songs by Bananarama, Elvis Costello, Dire Straits, Eurythmics, Howard Jones, and others. McCartney's contribution to the album was the previously unissued "Simple as That".
- The Prince's Trust 10th Anniversary Birthday Party (1987) – 1 song (plus 2 more songs on bonus single)
  - A live album of a concert recorded to benefit The Prince's Trust, featured the music of McCartney, Dire Straits, Phil Collins, Elton John, Tina Turner, and Rod Stewart. The album includes a live version of "Get Back". British copies of the album also contained a bonus single with a live version of McCartney performing "Long Tall Sally" on one side and "I Saw Her Standing There" on the other.
- Knebworth: The Album (1990) – 2 songs
  - A double live album recorded at Knebworth in 1990. In addition to Paul McCartney, the album also features performances by Tears for Fears, Genesis, Robert Plant, Phil Collins, Dire Straits, Eric Clapton, and Pink Floyd. On the album, McCartney performs "Coming Up" and "Hey Jude".
- For Our Children (1991) – 1 song
  - A various artists' album of children's songs released by Disney to benefit the Elizabeth Glaser Pediatric AIDS Foundation includes Wings' "Mary Had a Little Lamb".
- The Last Temptation of Elvis (1991) – 1 song
  - A British album of popular artists recording songs from various Elvis Presley movies. McCartney's contribution is "It's Now or Never".
- Earthrise: The Rainforest Album (1992) – 1 song
  - A various artists' album to draw attention to then environment includes McCartney's song, "How Many People."
- Music for Montserrat (1997) – 1 song
  - To raise money to benefit Hurricane-ravaged Montserrat, a Caribbean island where George Martin operates a recording studio, Martin recruited a number of recording artists to perform a concert at the Royal Albert Hall in London. A CD with highlights from the concert, including McCartney performing "Hey Jude", with Elton John and Sting taking a verse each, was released in 1997.
- Diana, Princess of Wales: Tribute (1997) -1 song
  - A various artists' tribute album to Princess Diana includes McCartney's "Little Willow," a song McCartney had originally written for Ringo Starr's children upon the death of their mother Maureen Starkey.
- Twentieth Century Blues: The Songs of Noel Coward (1998) – 1 song.
  - A tribute album to Noël Coward, it contains McCartney performing "A Room with a View".
- Maybe Baby: Original Soundtrack Featuring Music from and Inspired by the Film (2000) – 1 song
  - McCartney's version of the Buddy Holly song, "Maybe Baby" leads off the soundtrack album.
- Good Rockin' Tonight (2001) – 1 song
  - A tribute album to Elvis Presley's Sun Records sessions. In addition to McCartney, the album also contains contributions by Jeff Beck & Chrissie Hynde, Jimmy Page & Robert Plant, Elton John, Tom Petty & the Heartbreakers, Bob Dylan, Eric Clapton and others. McCartney's contribution to the album is "That's All Right".
- Brand New Boots and Panties (2001) – 1 song
  - A tribute album to Ian Dury, it contains McCartney performing "I'm Partial to Your Abracadabra".
- Music from Vanilla Sky (2001) – 1 song
  - McCartney performs the Oscar-nominated title song on the soundtrack to the film, Vanilla Sky.
- The Concert for New York City (2001) – 4 songs
  - In the wake of the 11 September attacks, McCartney arranged a benefit concert at Madison Square Garden in New York featuring many of the top names in music. The double live album of the concert included four Beatles/McCartney songs, including the live version of "Freedom", which had also been added, at the last minute, to McCartney's upcoming album, Driving Rain. The McCartney tracks on The Concert for New York City are as follows:
    - "I'm Down"
    - "Yesterday"
    - "Let It Be"
    - "Freedom"
- A Tribute to the King (2002) – one song
  - A tribute album to Elvis Presley, it contains McCartney performing "All Shook Up".
- Party at the Palace (2002) – two songs
  - A live album of the concert recorded for Queen Elizabeth II's Golden Jubilee. The album features McCartney on the following two tracks:
    - "All You Need Is Love" (by Rod Stewart, Joe Cocker, Paul McCartney and various artists)
    - "Hey Jude" (by Paul McCartney featuring various artists)
- Music from the Motion Picture The In-Laws (2003) – one new song
  - The soundtrack to the 2003 re-make of the film, The In-Laws includes the previously unreleased (though widely bootlegged) McCartney song, "A Love for You". The soundtrack album also includes two previously released McCartney songs, "Live and Let Die" and "I'm Carrying". "Live and Let Die" appears here as an alternate version, different from the one used on the James Bond soundtrack from 1973.
- Concert for George (2003) – 4 songs
  - The live album honouring George Harrison, recorded on the first anniversary of Harrison's death. In addition to McCartney, the concert also featured Ringo Starr, Eric Clapton, Jeff Lynne, Billy Preston, and Tom Petty & the Heartbreakers. McCartney performed the following songs:
    - "For You Blue"
    - "Something" (by McCartney and Clapton)
    - "All Things Must Pass"
    - "While My Guitar Gently Weeps" (McCartney and Clapton)
- Goin' Home: A Tribute to Fats Domino (2007) – one song
  - A tribute album to Fats Domino, it contains McCartney (singing) performing "I Want to Walk You Home".
- Funny People Original Motion Picture Soundtrack (2009) – one song
  - The soundtrack album from the Adam Sandler film Funny People includes "Great Day" by McCartney.

== Duets and collaborations ==
- With Stevie Wonder
  - Tug of War (1982)
    - Contains "Ebony and Ivory", and "What's That You're Doing" by Stevie Wonder and Paul McCartney.
- With Carl Perkins
  - Tug of War (1982)
    - Contains "Get It" by Carl Perkins & Paul McCartney.
- With Michael Jackson
  - Thriller (1982)
    - Contains "The Girl Is Mine" by Michael Jackson with Paul McCartney.
  - Pipes of Peace (1983)
    - Contains "Say Say Say" and "The Man" by Paul McCartney with Michael Jackson.
- With Johnny Cash
  - Water from the Wells of Home (1988)
    - Contains "New Moon over Jamaica", a duet by Johnny Cash and Paul McCartney (with harmonies by June Carter Cash, Linda McCartney, and Tom T. Hall).
- With Elvis Costello
  - Flowers in the Dirt (1989)
    - Contains "You Want Her Too", a duet by Paul McCartney and Elvis Costello one of their songwriting collaborations also on "My Brave Face" and "That Day is Done"
  - Spike (1989)
    - Contains "Veronica", a collaboration by Elvis Costello and Paul McCartney.
- With Smokin' Mojo Filters (a.k.a. "Paul Weller & Friends")
  - The various artists' benefit album, Help (1995)
    - The album, which was released to benefit the Warchild charity, contained "Come Together", which Paul Weller, Paul McCartney, Steve Cradock, Damon Minchella of Ocean Colour Scene and Noel Gallagher released as the "Smokin' Mojo Filters".
- With Carl Perkins
  - Go Cat Go! (1996)
    - Contains "My Old Friend" by Carl Perkins & Paul McCartney.
- With Heather Mills
  - "Vo!ce" (CD single) (1999)
    - The record is credited to "Heather Mills featuring Paul McCartney." McCartney co-wrote the song with Mills, and he provided the backing vocals and guitar. The CD single contains the following three tracks:
      - "Vo!ce" (radio edit)
      - "Vo!ce" (Paul McCartney's Mellow Extension)
      - "Vo!ce" (Someone U Love mix)
- With Lindsay Pagano
  - Love & Faith & Inspiration (2001)
    - Contains a version of the McCartney composed "So Bad", by Lindsay Pagano with accompanying vocals by Paul McCartney.
- With Lulu
  - Together (2002)
    - Contains "Inside Thing (Let 'em In)", a duet by Lulu & Paul McCartney.
- With Brian Wilson
  - Gettin' in Over My Head (2004)
    - Contains "A Friend Like You", a duet by Brian Wilson and Paul McCartney.
- With George Michael
  - Twentyfive (2006)
    - Contains "Heal the Pain" by George Michael and Paul McCartney.
- With Tony Bennett
  - Duets: An American Classic (2006)
    - Contains "The Very Thought of You", a duet by Tony Bennett and Paul McCartney.
- With George Benson and Al Jarreau
  - Givin' It Up (2006)
    - Contains "Bring It On Home to Me" by George Benson, Al Jarreau and Paul McCartney
- With Nitin Sawhney
  - London Undersound (2008)
    - Contains "My Soul", a collaboration by Nitin Sawhney and Paul McCartney.
- With Straight No Chaser
  - Under the Influence: Holiday Edition (2013)
    - Contains a cover of "Wonderful Christmastime"
- With Dave Grohl, Krist Novoselic, Pat Smear
  - Sound City (OST) (2013)
    - Contains "Cut Me Some Slack", a collaboration with the former members of Nirvana.
- With Bloody Beetroots
  - Hide (2013)
    - Contains "Out of Sight", a collaboration between The Fireman (project of Paul McCartney and Youth) with the Bloody Beetroots.
- With Kanye West
  - "Only One" (2015), single which is a writing, production and performance collaboration with Kanye West (and others)
- With Kanye West and Rihanna
  - "FourFiveSeconds" (2015), single which is a writing, production and performance collaboration with Kanye West and Rihanna (and others)
- With Hollywood Vampires
  - Hollywood Vampires (2015)
    - The debut album of the rock supergroup formed by Alice Cooper, Johnny Depp and Joe Perry contains a new version of the McCartney composed "Come and Get It" with vocals by Paul McCartney and Alice Cooper.
- With Dominic Fike
  - ”Kiss of Venus” (2021)
    - single which is a writing and performing, production and collaboration performance with Dominic Fike.

== As producer, composer, or session musician ==
- Rusty Anderson
  - Undressing Underwater (2005)
    - McCartney contributes bass, backing vocals, and additional electric guitar to "Hurt Myself".
- Badfinger
  - Magic Christian Music (1969)
    - Contains "Come and Get It", which was written and produced by McCartney. Also, McCartney produced and played piano on "Rock of All Ages," and produced "Carry On Til Tomorrow."
- The Beach Boys
  - Smiley Smile (1967)
    - The song, "Vegetables" features the sound of McCartney eating raw carrots.
- Bonzo Dog Doo Dah Band
  - (no album)
    - The song, "I'm the Urban Spaceman" has McCartney under the alias of Apollo C. Vermouth.
- Elvis Costello
  - Spike (1989)
    - Contains "Veronica" and "Pads, Paws, and Claws", which were co-written by McCartney. McCartney also played the bass on "Veronica" and "...This Town..."
- Donovan
  - Mellow Yellow (1967)
    - McCartney played bass guitar (uncredited) on portions of the album.
    - McCartney can also be audibly heard cheering and whooping on Donovan's hit single "Mellow Yellow".
  - Barabajagal (1969)
    - Contains the song, "Atlantis" which is widely believed to feature the background vocals of McCartney (and on which, according to Harry Castleman and Walter Podrazik's book, All Together Now, McCartney not only provided the background vocals but also played the tambourine). McCartney is not listed in the album's credits. Furthermore, the various works of Mark Lewisohn (such as The Complete Beatles Chronicles and The Beatles Day by Day) fail to mention McCartney's participation on this song. In fact, according to the album's liner notes, the song was recorded in Los Angeles in November 1968, a month that, according to Lewisohn, McCartney spent mostly at his farm in Scotland.
- Foo Fighters
  - Concrete and Gold (2017)
    - McCartney played drums on the track "Sunday Rain".
- Allen Ginsberg
  - The Ballad of the Skeletons (1996)
    - Ginsberg recited his poetry to music. McCartney played guitar, drums, Hammond organ and maracas on the title track.
- George Harrison
  - Somewhere in England (1981)
    - The song "All Those Years Ago", a tribute to John Lennon, included McCartney on backing vocals and Ringo Starr on drums.
- Laurence Juber
  - Straight Time (1982)
    - The song "Maisie" is performed by Wings, with McCartney on bass, Juber on guitar, Steve Holley on drums and Denny Laine on harmonica.
- Denny Laine
  - Holly Days (1977)
    - Produced by McCartney, who also played most of the backing instruments and sang backing vocals on the album.
  - Japanese Tears (1980)
    - Three songs on the album, "Send Me The Heart", "I Would Only Smile", and "Weep For Love", were performed by Wings, with McCartney on bass, keyboards, guitar, percussion and vocals, and McCartney also co-wrote "Send Me the Heart."
- Steve Martin and the Steep Canyon Rangers
  - Rare Bird Alert (2011)
    - McCartney sang lead vocals on the track "Best Love."
- Linda McCartney
  - Wide Prairie (1998)
    - An album by McCartney's wife, Linda, which was produced and partially composed by Paul McCartney. McCartney also played many of the instruments on the album, and some of the tracks featured Wings, including two that were originally attributed to Suzy and the Red Stripes.
- Mike McGear
  - McGear (1974)
    - An album by McCartney's brother Michael, who sang lead vocals with Wings as his backing band. McCartney produced the album, composed or co-composed most of the tracks, sang harmony vocal on "The Man Who Found God on the Moon", and played bass, guitar and keyboards (although uncredited as a musician).
- Steve Miller Band
  - Brave New World (1970)
    - McCartney (credited as Paul Ramon) played bass, drums, and provides backing vocals to "My Dark Hour".
- The Scaffold
  - Sold Out (1975)
    - McCartney produced and Wings was the backing band on "Liverpool Lou" (with McCartney on bass); McCartney also produced and co-wrote the non-album B-side "Ten Years After on Strawberry Jam", performed by an uncredited Wings, with McCartney on bass and keyboards.
- Carly Simon
  - No Secrets (1972)
    - McCartney provided back-up vocals on "Night Owl".
- Super Furry Animals
  - Rings Around the World (2001)
    - The song, "Receptacle for the Respectable" featured McCartney eating celery.
- Ringo Starr
  - Sentimental Journey (1970)
    - McCartney arranged "Stardust".
  - Ringo (1973)
    - McCartney wrote, arranged, played piano and synthesizer, and provided backing vocals on "Six O'Clock" and played kazoo (credited as "mouth sax") on "You're Sixteen".
  - Ringo's Rotogravure (1976)
    - McCartney wrote and provided backing vocals to "Pure Gold".
  - Stop and Smell the Roses (1981)
    - McCartney wrote, played bass and piano, and lent backing vocals to "Private Property" and "Attention".
  - Vertical Man (1998)
    - McCartney played bass, lent backing vocals to "La De Da," "I Was Walking" and "What in the World" and appeared in the music video of "La De Da".
  - Y Not (2010)
    - McCartney played bass on "Peace Dream" and, listening to Starr's already finished tracks for the album, spontaneously improvised and recorded harmony vocals for "Walk With You" which were then included to the final version of the song
- James Taylor
  - James Taylor (1968)
    - McCartney played bass on "Carolina in My Mind".
  - Walking Man (1974)
    - Paul & Linda provided backing vocals on "Rock'n'Roll Is Music Now".
- Yusuf Islam
  - Roadsinger (2009)
    - McCartney sings backup on the song "Boots and Sand," written by Yusuf Islam in response to being denied entry into the United States in 2004 for suspected connections to Hamas, which turned out to be completely false. They are joined on the track by Dolly Parton.

== See also ==
- The Beatles albums discography
- The Beatles singles discography
- Paul McCartney discography
