= Kitten Kuroi =

American singer (born 1980)

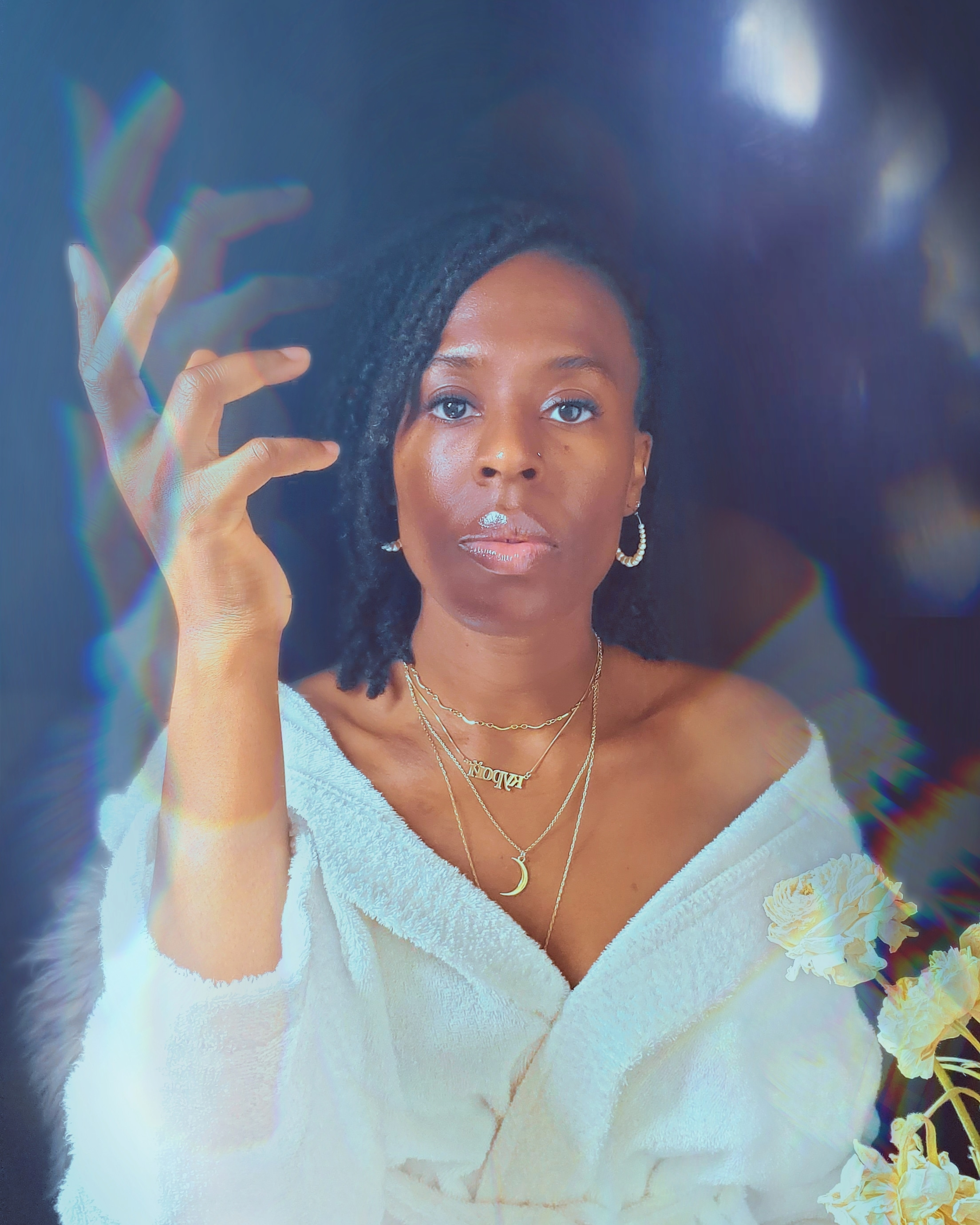

Background information
- Born: Aisha Luvenia Humphrey; 1980 (age 45–46); Inglewood, California, U.S.
- Genres: Pop; R&B; jazz; rock; Electronic Dance Music
- Occupations: Singer; television personality
- Years active: 2007–present
- Website: kittenkuroi.com

Aisha Luvenia Humphrey, known professionally as Kitten Kuroi, is an American singer. She is known for her work as a background vocalist for Elvis Costello. Kuroi performed with Costello on his 2018 Look Now album, which won a Grammy Award for Best Traditional Pop Vocal Album during the 62nd Annual Grammy Awards.

== Biography ==
Kuroi graduated from California State University, and previously wrote for mxdwn.com. She arranged background vocals and performed in Mike Garson's "A Bowie Celebration" in 2022.

Kuroi has also performed and toured with other artists including Billy Idol, Paul Stanley, Kate Hudson, Mykki Blanco, Pentatonix, Niki, Engelbert Humperdinck, Scotty Grand, Natasha Bedingfield, John Lloyd Young, Blondie, and Shanice.

== Veganism ==
Kuroi is a vegan and was featured in the documentary short, Vegan Noir: Black Vegans in Los Angeles.
