= Complicated Shadows =

Song written by Elvis Costello

Single by Elvis Costello & The Attractions

from the album All This Useless Beauty
- A-side: "The Other End of the Telescope"
- Released: July 15, 1996
- Length: 4:43
- Label: Warner Bros.
- Songwriter: Elvis Costello
- Producers: Geoff Emerick; Elvis Costello

Elvis Costello & The Attractions singles chronology
"Little Atoms" (1996)	"The Other End of the Telescope" / "Complicated Shadows" (1996)	"Distorted Angel" (1996)

"Complicated Shadows" is a song written by new wave musician Elvis Costello and recorded by Costello with his backing band the Attractions. The song appeared on Costello's 1996 album, All This Useless Beauty.

Costello originally wrote the song for Johnny Cash, but after Cash did not record the song, he chose to record a version with the Attractions in 1996. Though initially more country-influenced in arrangement, the song was reworked by the band to be more rock-oriented. The final studio recording on All This Useless Beauty edits together studio takes of the song with a live performance from a show at the Beacon Theatre in 1995.

Though not released as a single, it appeared as a B-side to "The Other End of the Telescope" as well as on the soundtrack to the television series The Sopranos. Since its release, the song has been lauded by critics. Costello rerecorded the song in its original arrangement in 2009 for his album Secret, Profane & Sugarcane.

== Background ==
Elvis Costello first wrote "Complicated Shadows" with the intention to give it to country musician Johnny Cash, who had previously recorded Costello songs such as "Hidden Shame". Ultimately, Cash never recorded the song. Costello reflected, "I sent it to him near the end of his life, and whether the song reached him or not or whether it didn't appeal to him, I hear it in his voice. I imagine John to be someone who could deliver the final lines of the song with authority, and it helped me write them to think of him singing them." Costello ultimately chose to record the song himself for All This Useless Beauty, an album which was originally intended to be a collection of songs Costello wrote for others.

Lyrically, the song tackles the subjects of vengeance and vigilantism. Costello explained in 1996, "If you go out there saying, 'I know what's right,' you'd better be right. [The song] describes that dilemma of taking justice into your own hands. We see it in the people in the West Country who kidnapped some local hooligan and beat him up, or in the LA riots." Because the song was intended for Cash, Costello wrote the lyrics in "semi-Biblical language."

== Recording ==
Originally, Costello had arranged the song in Cash's country style. Costello explained, "I think at first it probably sounded a little bit too much like a Johnny Cash song, and I didn't want to record it leaning that way with the Attractions." However, once Costello decided to revive the song for All This Useless Beauty, he and the Attractions re-arranged the song to have a slower, more rock-inflected style largely absent from the rest of the album. Costello commented on the new arrangement:

It's surprising how, by throwing away the clichéd way of doing things, you can do a really obvious thing, like turning up the guitar very loud, and that sounds original too. We've never had as loud an explosion on record as on 'Complicated Shadow,' and because it comes out of nothing it sounds like an original idea, whereas if you had it all the way through you wouldn't notice it. It's all light and shade and tension and release, everything in music.

When the band attempted to capture this style in the studio, however, they failed to capture a satisfactory recording. As such, producer Geoff Emerick and engineer Jon Jacobs stitched together a studio recording with sections from a live recording performed by the band at the Beacon Theatre in 1995. Jacobs explained the process in an interview in 1996:

Elvis Costello had always loved the take and somehow wanted to use it on record; now he had an inspiration... "He said, 'I know this is crazy and it won't work, but let's make it not work.' ... Originally, when Elvis came up with the idea, I thought it was going to be a nightmare. You know, we'd have to treat the studio and live versions as two separate entities, doing all of the overdubs separately, mix them separately and then tear our hair out when it came to mixing them together. But, after mucking about on my own for a few hours with different levels going to different tracks — and also selecting which of four separate amp feeds from the live gig I was going to use on one track — it worked very well. If you listen to the track, I think you'll spot the edit, but you'll also hear how well it works.

== Release ==
"Complicated Shadows" was released on Costello's 1996 album All This Useless Beauty in May 1996. Although not released as a single, the song appeared on the B-side of "The Other End of the Telescope" in July 1996. In some jurisdictions, the version that appeared on the single was the so-called "Cashbox" version, which was Costello's country-influenced demo of the song. In other locations, the standard studio recording with the Attractions was used.

"Complicated Shadows" appeared in season one of The Sopranos, giving it greater exposure. Martin Bruestle, a producer on the show who helped Chase select the show's music, commented that creator David Chase was a "massive Elvis fan" and had previously used Costello's version of "(What's So Funny 'Bout) Peace, Love, and Understanding" in his 1988 show Almost Grown. The song then appeared on the soundtrack album The Sopranos: Music from the HBO Original Series. Entertainment Weekly concluded of the song's inclusion, "If the show hired Nick Lowe or Elvis Costello to write anthems for its Mob family, they couldn't come up with anything as dead-on as Lowe's 'The Beast in Me' or Costello's 'Complicated Shadows.'"

== Critical reception ==
"Complicated Shadows" attracted positive critical reception from music writers upon its release. The London Telegraph wrote of the track, "The song mainlines into a world of John Ford cowboys with a conviction that suggests the author really is some saddlesore ex-rodeo jock rather than a bespectacled post-punk." People praised how the song "opens quietly but literally builds to a scream", while the Bergen County Record commented, "The bluesy tune was originally written for Johnny Cash, but it's difficult to imagine the Man in Black doing it the kind of justice Costello and company do." Q wrote, "Why on earth Johnny Cash never bothered to record the brooding 'Complicated Shadows' is something only his doctors must know" in a 1996 review; in a review of the 2001 reissue of All This Useless Beauty, meanwhile, Q named it a standout track from the album.

== Personnel ==
Elvis Costello & The Attractions

- Elvis Costello – vocals, guitar
- Steve Nieve – piano, keyboards
- Bruce Thomas – bass
- Pete Thomas – drums

Production

- Geoff Emerick – producer, engineer, mixing
- Elvis Costello – producer
- Jon Jacobs – engineer, mixing
- Bob Ludwig – mastering

== 2009 version ==
"Complicated Shadows"

Single by Elvis Costello

from the album Secret, Profane & Sugarcane
- B-side: "Dirty Rotten Shame"
- Released: April 18, 2009
- Length: 2:54
- Label: Hear Music
- Producer: T Bone Burnett

Elvis Costello singles chronology
"Go Away" (2008)	"Complicated Shadows" (2009)	"A Slow Drag with Josephine" (2010)

In 2009, Costello rerecorded "Complicated Shadows for his 2009 album, Secret, Profane & Sugarcane. Though Costello was hesitant to rerecord a song, he determined, "About four people bought [All this Useless Beauty]. The only people who remark on whether it's a good or a bad thing, or even whether I have recorded this song twice, are obviously people who are following my career very carefully."

For this recording, Costello leaned closer to the country style that he originally wrote the song in, a style present on the "Cashbox" demo version. He explained, "The matters of the text needed to be held a little more closely to the chest than the rock 'n' roll version did." Elsewhere, he commented, "I always wanted to record the version I heard in my head."

This version was then released as a single in April 2009, featuring the then-unreleased All This Useless Beauty reject "Dirty Rotten Shame" as the B-side. The song was a moderate Adult Alternative hit, reaching number 15 on the American Adult Alternative Songs chart.

The rerecording of "Complicated Shadows" generally saw mixed critical reception, with reviewers often expressing a preference for the original recording. The A.V. Club wrote in a review of Secret, Profane & Sugarcane, "The older Costello songs 'Hidden Shame' and 'Complicated Shadows' remain infectious, even in the staid acoustic versions presented here." In another review of the album The Washington Post stated, "The best song here, "Complicated Shadows," already did come out on 1996's All This Useless Beauty, in a more compelling rock form." More approvingly, Time Out Sydney wrote, "Certainly the rollicking country strum lifts the song compared with the leaden rock arrangement on 1996's All this Useless Beauty."

=== Charts ===
Chart (2009)	Peak position
US Billboard Adult Alternative Songs	15
