= Costello & Nieve =

Live album by Elvis Costello and Steve Nieve
- Released: 3 December 1996
- Recorded: 14–22 May 1996
- Genre: Rock
- Length: 113:26
- Label: Warner Bros.

Elvis Costello and Steve Nieve chronology
All This Useless Beauty (1996)	Costello & Nieve (1996)	Extreme Honey (1997)

Professional ratings
Review scores
Source	Rating
Allmusic	3.5/5 stars
Encyclopedia of Popular Music	3/5 stars

Costello & Nieve is a limited edition five-disc live album by Elvis Costello and Steve Nieve, released in 1996. It was recorded in Los Angeles, San Francisco, Chicago, Boston and New York City.

== Track listing ==
All tracks are written by Elvis Costello unless otherwise indicated.

Disc 1, Los Angeles: Live at the Troubadour
No.	Title	Writer(s)	Length
1.	"Temptation"		3:50
2.	"Poor Fractured Atlas"		4:58
3.	"I Just Don't Know What to Do with Myself"	Burt Bacharach, Hal David	3:27
4.	"It's Time"		5:55
5.	"Man Out of Time"		4:53
6.	"Shallow Grave"	Costello, Paul McCartney	2:54

Disc 2, San Francisco: Live at the Fillmore
No.	Title	Writer(s)	Length
1.	"Just About Glad"		3:59
2.	"Why Can't a Man Stand Alone?"		4:10
3.	"My Dark Life"		7:13
4.	"All This Useless Beauty"		5:57
5.	"Ship of Fools"	Jerry Garcia, Robert Hunter	6:12

Disc 3, Chicago: Live at the Park West
No.	Title	Writer(s)	Length
1.	"The Long Honeymoon"		4:25
2.	"Starting to Come to Me"		2:47
3.	"The Other End of the Telescope"	Costello, Aimee Mann	4:32
4.	"All the Rage"		4:02
5.	"Watching the Detectives"		6:09

Disc 4, Boston: Live at the Paradise
No.	Title	Writer(s)	Length
1.	"You Bowed Down"		4:56
2.	"The Long Honeymoon"		4:46
3.	"Distorted Angel"		4:45
4.	"(The Angels Wanna Wear My) Red Shoes"		2:49
5.	"Little Atoms"		5:37
6.	"My Funny Valentine"	Richard Rodgers, Lorenz Hart	3:02

Disc 5, New York City: Live at the Supper Club
No.	Title	Writer(s)	Length
1.	"Black Sails in the Sunset"		3:17
2.	"You'll Never Be a Man"		3:16
3.	"Just a Memory"		3:44
4.	"I Want to Vanish"		3:22
5.	"Medley: "Alison"; "Living a Little, Laughing a Little; "Tracks of My Tears"; "The Tears of a Clown"; "No More Tearstained Make-Up"; "Clowntime is Over""	Costello, Thom Bell, Linda Creed, Smokey Robinson, Warren "Pete" Moore, Marv Tarplin, Stevie Wonder, Hank Cosby	6:16
Total length:			113:26

== Personnel ==
- Elvis Costello - guitar, vocals
- Steve Nieve - piano
- Pete Thomas - drums on "Man Out of Time" & "Shallow Grave"
