= The Other Side of Summer =

Single by Elvis Costello

from the album Mighty Like a Rose
- Released: April 1991
- Recorded: Late 1990 – early 1991
- Genre: Rock
- Length: 3:53
- Label: Warner Bros.
- Songwriter: Elvis Costello
- Producers: Elvis Costello; Kevin Killen; Mitchell Froom

Elvis Costello singles chronology
"...This Town..." (1989)	"The Other Side of Summer" (1991)	"So Like Candy" (1991)

"The Other Side of Summer" is a song by Elvis Costello, released as a single from his 1991 album Mighty Like a Rose. It was written by Costello and was co-produced by Costello, Mitchell Froom and Kevin Killen. A Beach Boys pastiche, the song featured a Wall of Sound production. The single reached number 43 in the UK Singles Chart and charted in Canada and Australia. It also reached number 1 on the US Modern Rock Tracks chart and number 40 on the Album Rock Tracks chart.

== Overview ==
Recorded at Ocean Way studios, the song was intended as a Beach Boys pastiche, in a similar vein to the Beatles' "Back in the U.S.S.R.", though the vocal deliveries were more similar to 1970s Beach Boys album tracks like "Funky Pretty" and "The Trader". In attempt to get a Wall of Sound style of production, the recording featured two basses, two guitars and many keyboard tracks. The rhythm track was double tracked before further percussion was added. Costello said, "There are 14 keyboards on 'The Other Side of Summer,' all playing the same thing, but nobody's going to sit and count them."

Musicians who perform on the track include Larry Knechtel, Jerry Scheff, James Burton, Benmont Tench, T-Bone Wolk and Mitchell Froom.

The opening lines of the 3rd verse ("Was it a millionaire who said 'imagine no possessions'? / A poor little schoolboy who said 'we don't need no lessons'?") refer to John Lennon and Pink Floyd respectively. Costello said, "'The Other Side of Summer' is not a slap at John Lennon. John Lennon wrote some wonderful songs, but "Imagine", which has been so sanctified, was one of his worst. He didn't think it all the way through."

Interviewed in Q, Costello said the song was, "obviously designed to be as much like a Californian summer record as possible, but you listen to what's going on in the song and it's contradictory of that. It's like playing and writing what people do sometimes rather crudely with samplers."

== Reception ==
AllMusic described the song as "Elvis Costello at his bitingly cynical best" and "a gloriously wordy pop masterpiece". The reviewer notes how the sunny music is juxtaposed with biting lyrics.

Alternately, Goldmine stated the song "tries to sound like the Beach Boys, but succeeds only in sounding like Squeeze." While Entertainment Weekly said the song was "an overview of social chaos, from the singer's unseasonal depression about aspects of human folly to ecological dread," it found the song "clever and complex but too formal."

Barney Hoskyns said the song "was Costello at his glibbest. With the crude irony of its Beach Boys pastiche – replete with original Brian Wilson keyboard man Larry Knechtel – this "anti-summer" summer record about the "poisonous surf" and the nightmare of the Californian dream only succeeded in irritating."

== Charts ==
Chart performance for "The Other Side of Summer"
Chart (1991)	Peak position
Australia (ARIA)	96
Canada Top Singles (RPM)	72
Europe (European Hit Radio)	17
Luxembourg (Radio Luxembourg)	16
UK Singles (OCC)	43
UK Airplay (Music Week)	16
US Album Rock Tracks (Billboard)	40
US Modern Rock Tracks (Billboard)	1

== See also ==
- List of Billboard number-one alternative singles of the 1990s
