= Deep Dead Blue =

Live album by Elvis Costello and Bill Frisell
- Released: 14 August 1995
- Recorded: 25 June 1995
- Length: 26:45
- Label: Nonesuch

Elvis Costello chronology
Kojak Variety (1995)	Deep Dead Blue (1995)	All This Useless Beauty (1996)

Bill Frisell chronology
The High Sign/One Week (1995)	Deep Dead Blue (1995)	Quartet (1996)

Professional ratings
Review scores
Source	Rating
AllMusic	3/5 stars
Encyclopedia of Popular Music	3/5 stars
NME	3/10

Deep Dead Blue is a live album by Elvis Costello with Bill Frisell, released in 1995. It was recorded at the Meltdown Festival on 25 June 1995.

== Critical reception ==
The Allmusic review by Steve Huey states "It's no real surprise that the two work well together, given the musical affinity demonstrated on Frisell's masterful reinterpretations of Painted from Memory material on his own album The Sweetest Punch. The pleasures of Deep Dead Blue are, to be sure, much subtler than either of those recordings, but they make an elegant and fascinating supplement".

== Track listing ==
No.	Title	Writer(s)	Length
1.	"Weird Nightmare"	Charles Mingus	3:35
2.	"Love Field"	Elvis Costello	3:24
3.	"Shamed into Love"	Rubén Blades, Costello	4:26
4.	"Gigi"	Alan Jay Lerner, Frederick Loewe	4:16
5.	"Poor Napoleon"	Declan MacManus	4:05
6.	"Baby Plays Around"	Cait O'Riordan, MacManus	3:08
7.	"Deep Dead Blue"	Costello, Bill Frisell	3:51
Total length:			26:45

== Personnel ==
- Elvis Costello - vocals
- Bill Frisell - guitar

Technical

- Roger Moutenot - engineer, mixing
- Lee Townsend - mixing

== Charts ==
Chart performance for Deep Dead Blue
Chart (1996)	Peak position
Australian Albums (ARIA)	194
