= National Ransom =

Studio album by Elvis Costello
- Released: 25 October 2010
- Genre: Alternative country, roots rock
- Length: 62:33
- Label: Hear Music/Universal
- Producer: T Bone Burnett

Elvis Costello chronology
Live at Hollywood High (2010)	National Ransom (2010)	Wise Up Ghost (2013)

Professional ratings
Review scores
Source	Rating
AllMusic	4.5/5 stars
The A.V. Club	B+
Consequence of Sound	3.5/5 stars
Mojo	4/5 stars
PopMatters	8/10 stars
Rolling Stone	3.5/5 stars
Slant Magazine	4/5 stars
Spin	7/10 stars
Uncut	4/5 stars

National Ransom is a studio album by English singer-songwriter Elvis Costello, released on 25 October 2010 (2 November in the US) through the Hear Music label. It was recorded in Nashville and Los Angeles with American songwriter and producer T Bone Burnett. The album's cover art is made by Maakies creator Tony Millionaire.

Featured musicians include Costello's recent backing bands The Imposters and The Sugarcanes, while the album also includes guest appearances by Vince Gill, Marc Ribot, Buddy Miller, Jim Lauderdale and Leon Russell.

The album was positively received by critics, earning a score of 79/100 on the review aggregate website Metacritic.

== Track listing ==
All tracks are written by Elvis Costello, except where noted.

No.	Title	Writer(s)	Length
1.	"National Ransom"		4:05
2.	"Jimmie Standing in the Rain"		4:15
3.	"Stations of the Cross"		4:58
4.	"A Slow Drag with Josephine"		2:43
5.	"Five Small Words"		4:45
6.	"Church Underground"		5:02
7.	"You Hung the Moon"		3:55
8.	"Bullets for the New-Born King"		3:35
9.	"I Lost You"	Costello; Jim Lauderdale	2:56
10.	"Dr. Watson, I Presume"		3:41
11.	"One Bell Ringing"		3:37
12.	"The Spell That You Cast"		2:32
13.	"That's Not the Part of Him You're Leaving"		4:43
14.	"My Lovely Jezebel"	Costello; T Bone Burnett; Leon Russell	2:31
15.	"All These Strangers"	Costello; Burnett	5:53
16.	"A Voice in the Dark"		3:34
17.	"I Hope" (iTunes/Japan CD bonus track)	Robert Charles Guidry; Stanley Lewis	3:33

=== National Ransack EP ===
Originally a digital download was given away with orders for the album. The EP was later released separately on 10-inch vinyl.

No.	Title	Writer(s)	Length
1.	"Poor Borrowed Dress"	Costello; Lauderdale	2:32
2.	"Condemned Man"		4:18
3.	"Big Boys Cry"	Eddy Raven	3:45
4.	"I Don't Want to Go Home"		3:00

== Personnel ==
- Dennis Crouch – double bass
- Davey Faragher – Fender Precision electric bass
- Pete Thomas – drums
- Marc Ribot – electric guitar, acoustic guitar, banjo
- Buddy Miller – harmony vocals
- Jerry Douglas – lap steel guitar
- Mike Compton – mandolin, harmony vocals
- Vince Gill – harmony vocals
- Jim Lauderdale – harmony vocals
- Steve Nieve – Vox Continental organ, Hammond organ, celesta
- T Bone Burnett – reverse piano, Gretsch Black Falcon electric guitar
- Jeff Taylor – piano, accordion
- Stuart Duncan – electric violin, zither, electric viola
- Dave Eggar – cello
- Darrell Leonard – trumpet, flugelhorn
- George Bohanon – trombone
- Ira Nepus – trombone
- Tom Peterson – baritone saxophone, bass clarinet
- Maurice Spears – bass trombone
- Andrew Duckles – viola
- Matt Funes – viola
- Caroline Campbell – violin
- Lucia Micarelli – violin
- Neel Hammond – violin
- Radu Pieptea – violin
- Bruce Dukov – violin, concertmaster
- Mike Piersante – shaker
- Elvis Costello – Gibson L-00 acoustic guitar, Fender Telecaster electric guitar, Ampeg AEB-1 bass guitar, reverse piano, Farfisa organ, lead vocals, harmony vocals, whistling

== Charts ==
Chart (2010)	Peak position
Australian Albums (ARIA)	158
Belgian Albums (Ultratop Flanders)	38
Japanese Albums (Oricon)	116
Spanish Albums (Promusicae)	86
UK Albums (OCC)	71
US Billboard 200	39
