= Kojak Variety =

Studio album by Elvis Costello
- Released: 9 May 1995
- Recorded: 1989–1994
- Genre: Rock
- Length: 53:57
- Label: Warner Bros.
- Producers: Kevin Killen and Elvis Costello

Elvis Costello chronology
The Very Best of Elvis Costello and The Attractions 1977–86 (1994)	Kojak Variety (1995)	Deep Dead Blue (1995)

Professional ratings
Review scores
Source	Rating
AllMusic	2/5 stars
Blender	3/5 stars
Chicago Tribune	2/4 stars
Encyclopedia of Popular Music	2/5 stars
Entertainment Weekly	B−
The Guardian	4/5 stars
Los Angeles Times	3/4 stars
Mojo	3/5 stars
Q	2/5 stars
Rolling Stone	3/5 stars
Uncut	3/5 stars

Kojak Variety is the fifteenth studio album by English musician Elvis Costello, released in 1995 through Warner Bros. Records. It is composed of cover songs. In 2004, Rhino Records reissued an expanded, double-CD version of the album, containing a bonus disc.

== Background ==
Costello said in the liner notes this was a "record of some of my favourite songs performed with some of my favourite musicians." but that he didn't want to record songs that were too familiar. Costello had searched independent record shops: Potter's Music in Richmond, Probe in Liverpool, Rock On in Camden Town, and many American thrift stores and pawn shops to discover albums that he previously had only known from singles or compilations. Costello said he made his best discoveries in what he called "the greatest record collecting store in the world", Village Music in Mill Valley, California.

The first song recorded for the album was "Running Out of Fools", while the last was a new rendering of "Days" by The Kinks, which he had previously recorded for the soundtrack album Until the End of the World, for the Wim Wenders's film of the same name. The title Kojak Variety refers to the name of a variety store in Barbados near where the album was recorded; Costello was amused by the seemingly random name of the enterprise, and in a similar spirit, decided to apply the name to his album.

== Track listing ==
No.	Title	Original artist	Length
1.	"Strange" (Screamin' Jay Hawkins)	Screamin' Jay Hawkins	2:39
2.	"Hidden Charms" (Willie Dixon)	Willie Dixon	3:29
3.	"Remove this Doubt" (Brian Holland / Lamont Dozier / Edward Holland, Jr.)	The Supremes	3:52
4.	"I Threw It All Away" (Bob Dylan)	Bob Dylan	3:23
5.	"Leave My Kitten Alone" (Little Willie John / Titus Turner)	Little Willie John	3:10
6.	"Everybody's Crying Mercy" (Mose Allison)	Mose Allison	4:05
7.	"I've Been Wrong Before" (Randy Newman)	Cilla Black	3:01
8.	"Bama Lama Bama Loo" (Richard Penniman)	Little Richard	2:45
9.	"Must You Throw Dirt in My Face" (Bill Anderson)	Louvin Brothers	3:49
10.	"Pouring Water on a Drowning Man" (Drew Baker / Dani McCormick)	James Carr	3:39
11.	"The Very Thought of You" (Ray Noble)	Ray Noble featuring Al Bowlly	3:42
12.	"Payday" (Jesse Winchester)	Jesse Winchester	2:57
13.	"Please Stay" (Burt Bacharach / Bob Hilliard)	The Drifters	4:49
14.	"Running Out of Fools" (Richard Ahlert / Kay Rogers)	Aretha Franklin	3:04
15.	"Days" (Ray Davies)	The Kinks	4:54
Total length:			53:57

2004 Rhino bonus disc
No.	Title	Original artist	Length
1.	"Ship of Fools" (Jerry Garcia / Robert Hunter)	The Grateful Dead	5:21
2.	"My Resistance Is Low" (Harold Adamson / Hoagy Carmichael)	Hoagy Carmichael	2:00
3.	"Innocent When You Dream" (Tom Waits)	Tom Waits	4:30
4.	"I'm Coming Home" (T Bone Burnett)	T Bone Burnett	3:13
5.	"The Dark End of the Street" (Chips Moman / Dan Penn)	James Carr	3:10
6.	"Congratulations" (Paul Simon)	Paul Simon	2:47
7.	"You're Gonna Make Me Lonesome When You Go" (Dylan)	Bob Dylan	2:13
8.	"Pouring Water on a Drowning Man (Alternate Version)" (Baker / McCormick)	James Carr	2:54
9.	"Still Feeling Blue" (Gram Parsons)	Gram Parsons	2:23
10.	"Brilliant Disguise" (Bruce Springsteen)	Bruce Springsteen	4:03
11.	"How Long Has This Been Going On?" (George Gershwin / Ira Gershwin)	Bobbe Arnst	2:31
12.	"Sleepless Nights" (Felice Bryant / Boudleaux Bryant)	The Everly Brothers	3:58
13.	"Step Inside Love" (John Lennon / Paul McCartney)	Cilla Black	2:49
14.	"You've Got to Hide Your Love Away" (Lennon / McCartney)	The Beatles	2:38
15.	"Sally Sue Brown" (Arthur Alexander)	Arthur Alexander	2:19
16.	"Sticks and Stones" (Turner)	Ray Charles	1:36
17.	"That's How You Got Killed Before (with The Dirty Dozen Brass Band)" (Dave Bartholomew)	Dave Bartholomew and His Orchestra	3:14
18.	"The Night Before Larry Was Stretched" (Traditional)	Johnny Moynihan	5:10
19.	"But Not for Me (with Larry Adler)" (Gershwin / Gershwin)	Ginger Rogers	5:04
20.	"Full Force Gale" (Van Morrison)	Van Morrison	2:59

Tracks 1, "Strange," and 5, "Leave My Kitten Alone," have slightly longer running times and later fade-outs on the 2004 reissue (track 1 is 2:49 on the reissue; track 5 is 3:18).

== Personnel ==
- Elvis Costello – vocals, harmonica
- James Burton – acoustic guitar, electric guitar, rhythm guitar
- Jim Keltner – drums
- Larry Knechtel – piano, Hammond organ, electric piano
- Marc Ribot – banjo, electric guitar, rhythm guitar, horn, classical guitar
- Jerry Scheff – bass
- Pete Thomas – drums

== Charts ==
Chart performance for Kojak Variety
Chart (1995)	Peak position
Australian Albums (ARIA)	102
US Billboard 200	102
