= Secret, Profane & Sugarcane =

Studio album by Elvis Costello
- Released: 9 June 2009
- Recorded: 2008–2009
- Studios: Sound Emporium (Nashville, Tennessee)
- Genres: Americana; country folk; country rock
- Length: 57:36
- Labels: Hear Music; Universal
- Producer: T Bone Burnett

Elvis Costello chronology
Momofuku (2008)	Secret, Profane & Sugarcane (2009)	Live at Hollywood High (2010)

Secret, Profane & Sugarcane is a studio album by Elvis Costello, released on 9 June 2009 through Hear Music label. It was recorded in Nashville with American songwriter and producer T Bone Burnett. The album features bluegrass, Americana and country music along with Costello's familiar garrulous lyrics. The artwork was designed by comic strip artist Tony Millionaire.

Secret, Profane & Sugarcane entered the UK Albums Chart at number 71, where it spent one week before dropping out of the top 100. It was far more successful in the US, when it charted at number 13 on the Billboard 200.

== Background ==
In the albums before Secret, Profane & Sugarcane, Costello had experimented with various styles of music including jazz, classical and others. For this album, Costello returned to an acoustic band set-up for the first time since 1986's King of America album. Recorded in Nashville, Tennessee in three days, Costello's 29th studio album was released on Starbucks' Hear Music label to generally good critical acclaim.

== Critical response ==
Professional ratings
Review scores
Source	Rating
AllMusic	3.5/5 stars
The Daily Telegraph	3/5 stars
Entertainment Weekly	B+
The Guardian	4/5 stars
The Phoenix	4/5 stars
Pitchfork	3.8/10
Rolling Stone	3.5/5 stars
Spin	3.5/5 stars

Critics looked upon Secret, Profane & Sugarcane in a generally very favourable way with some exceptions. Reviewing for Rolling Stone, Jody Rosen said that Costello was "in one of his comfort zones" and had made a "tight, uncluttered" album. Bud Scoppa, reviewing the album for Uncut, gave it a four-star rating, saying it was a "rootsy beauty" and "...his most engaging album in a very long time". In a more dismissive review, Pitchfork Media gave the album a 3.8 out of 10, and called the album "yet another entry in Costello's string of gestural albums" .

== Track listing ==
All tracks are written by Elvis Costello, except where noted.

No.	Title	Writer(s)	Length
1.	"Down Among the Wines and Spirits"		3:11
2.	"Complicated Shadows"		2:53
3.	"I Felt the Chill Before the Winter Came"	Costello, Loretta Lynn	3:59
4.	"My All Time Doll"		4:09
5.	"Hidden Shame"		4:14
6.	"She Handed Me a Mirror"		4:04
7.	"I Dreamed of My Old Lover"		2:35
8.	"How Deep Is the Red"		3:47
9.	"She Was No Good"		3:47
10.	"Sulphur to Sugarcane"	Costello, T Bone Burnett	5:59
11.	"Red Cotton"		5:43
12.	"The Crooked Line"	Costello, Burnett	3:49
13.	"Changing Partners"	Larry Coleman, Joe Darion	2:39

Bonus tracks
No.	Title	Writer(s)	Length
14.	"Femme Fatale" (LP, Japan CD and iTunes)	Lou Reed	3:49
15.	"What Lewis Did Last" (LP, Japan CD, Amazon US CD pre-order, Amazon US MP3 single and iTunes Europe pre-order)	Costello, Traditional	4:49
16.	"Dirty Rotten Shame" (iTunes US/Canada pre-order)		3:48

== Personnel ==
The following people contributed to Secret, Profane & Sugarcane:

- Elvis Costello – acoustic guitar, vocals
- T Bone Burnett – electric guitar, production
- Jeff Taylor – accordion
- Mike Compton – mandolin
- Dennis Crouch – double bass
- Jerry Douglas – dobro
- Stuart Duncan – banjo, fiddle
- Emmylou Harris – harmony vocals
- Jim Lauderdale – harmony vocals

== Charts ==
Chart	Peak position
Australian Albums (ARIA)	73
Belgian Albums (Ultratop Flanders)	39
Canadian Albums (Billboard)	13
Italian Albums (FIMI)	71
Spanish Albums (Promusicae)	88
Swedish Albums (Sverigetopplistan)	45
UK Albums (Official Charts)	71
US Billboard 200	13
US Top Alternative Albums (Billboard)	7
US Top Rock Albums (Billboard)	8
