= Look Now =

Studio album by Elvis Costello and the Imposters
- Released: 12 October 2018
- Recorded: 2018
- Studios: Hollywood, New York City, and Vancouver
- Length: 47:14
- Label: Concord
- Producers: Elvis Costello, Sebastian Krys

Elvis Costello and the Imposters chronology
Wise Up Ghost (2013)	Look Now (2018)	Purse (2019)

Singles from Look Now
- 1. "Unwanted Number" Released: 2018; 2. "Under Lime" Released: 2018

Look Now is the 30th studio album by English singer-songwriter Elvis Costello and the Imposters, released on 12 October 2018. Look Now was the first studio album released by Costello since 2013. The album was co-produced by Costello and Sebastian Krys.

The majority of the songs here were written by Costello, though three were co-written with Burt Bacharach. Costello's collaboration with Carole King, "Burnt Sugar Is So Bitter," had existed only as a demo for 20 years before being produced for release on Look Now. Costello told NPR that Look Now is the "uptown pop record with a little swagger" that he had been wanting to make for 20 years.

Look Now won the Grammy Award for Best Traditional Pop Vocal Album at the 62nd Grammy Awards. Costello and the Imposters toured America in support of the album in November and December 2018.

== Critical reception ==
Professional ratings
Aggregate scores
Source	Rating
AnyDecentMusic?	7.5/10
Metacritic	83/100
Review scores
Source	Rating
AllMusic	4/5 stars
American Songwriter	4/5 stars
The Independent	4/5 stars
The Irish Times	4/5 stars
Mojo	5/5 stars
Pitchfork	8.0/10
Q	4/5 stars
Rolling Stone	3.5/5 stars
The Times	4/5 stars
Uncut	8/10

Look Now was extensively reviewed upon its release, and received aggregate ratings of 7.5/10 and 83/100 from AnyDecentMusic? and Metacritic respectively. NPR Music described the album as "Meticulously crafted, clever, polished...you can't imagine a group of surer hands for him to be working with" and called it one of the "best new albums" out at the time it was released.

Chris Willman inVariety called Elvis Costello and the Imposters "the world's greatest pit band." Willman explained his description by stating that he intended it to act as "a raging endorsement of Costello's rage-free side," adding "It's so funny to be seeing him [Costello], after all this time, making a great cake of an album that doesn't really sound that much like any of the 30 before it."

USA Today said, "The sophisticated chamber-pop arrangements suggest a return to the form he first explored in depth on Imperial Bedroom, a 1982 release produced by Beatles engineer Geoff Emerick. And it does so while holding its own against that masterpiece, perhaps because it was conceived after revisiting that album on the road."

Joe Lynch for Billboard praised the album as "a collection of lush, sophisticated pop."

Pitchfork stated: "Look Now plays at first like a simple set of songs that eschews grand concepts for immediacy... Despite their stateliness, these tunes are startlingly direct, both emotionally and melodically. They carry only the vaguest air of Costello’s signature cleverness and no trace of anger. [After 'Under Lime',] the rest of Look Now proceeds at a gentler, empathetic pace, lingering upon the bittersweet plights of their protagonists—usually women, always etched with kindness—instead of rushing toward a conclusion."

Uproxx described Costello as "one of the greatest songwriters of the last 40 years. Full-stop, no question, no debate necessary." It added that the track "Unwanted Number," with its "mix of cheeky irreverence and deep melancholy sadness" was indescribable other than as an Elvis Costello song.

Consequence of Sound stated, "Costello's been around so long that it should be easy to pinpoint what a new record will sound like even before fans put ears to it, but his ability to shape-shift in and out of genres wide and far still gives his new material a bit of intrigue. Look Now is another solid entry into an already healthy and vital body of work. It’s not his absolute best, but it still earns a spot in the meatier part of his iconic recording arc."

Some reviewers were less enthusiastic. Kitty Empire for The Observer gave the album a score of 6/10 in her review, stating that "The album’s title speaks of urgency; its nearest song, 'Don’t Look Now,' details the unwanted advances that bedevil a model. But the episode twinkles a little too prettily for the subject matter." Similarly, The Evening Standard gave the album a score of 6/10, describing "The arrangements [as] gorgeous, some of the chorus hooks less so, and overall the laid-back Broadway-meets-Abbey Road vibe suit[ing] his adroit observations."

AllMusic called the album "a cross between Imperial Bedroom and Painted from Memory, Costello's 1998 collaboration with Burt Bacharach," adding that the album "isn't rock & roll so much as it is pop that blends the craft of classic Brill Building tunes of the '60s with the narrative maturity of classic Broadway musicals and the sort of ballads that were once the purview of classic jazz vocalists." A reviewer for The Associated Press described the album as a series of lamentations by various characters.

== Track listing ==
Look Now
No.	Title	Writer(s)	Length
1.	"Under Lime"	Elvis Costello	5:35
2.	"Don't Look Now"	Burt Bacharach, Costello	2:28
3.	"Burnt Sugar Is So Bitter"	Costello, Carole King	4:16
4.	"Stripping Paper"	Costello	3:52
5.	"Unwanted Number"	Costello	3:33
6.	"I Let the Sun Go Down"	Costello	4:26
7.	"Mr. and Mrs. Hush"	Costello	3:46
8.	"Photographs Can Lie"	Bacharach, Costello	3:38
9.	"Dishonor the Stars"	Costello	3:18
10.	"Suspect My Tears"	Costello	4:49
11.	"Why Won't Heaven Help Me?"	Costello	3:22
12.	"He's Given Me Things"	Bacharach, Costello	4:11
Total length:			47:14

== "Regarde Maintenant" ==
The deluxe edition of the album was released with a bonus EP called "Regarde Maintenant," also credited to Elvis Costello & the Imposters, containing four tracks. These tracks were also included on deluxe digital editions of the album, as well as the vinyl 2xLP.

Track listing
No.	Title	Writer(s)	Length
13.	"Isabelle in Tears"	Elvis Costello	4:02
14.	"Adieu Paris (L'Envie Des Étoiles)"	Elvis Costello	3:31
15.	"The Final Mrs. Curtain"	Elvis Costello	2:58
16.	"You Shouldn't Look at Me That Way" (from the Motion Picture Film Stars Don't Die in Liverpool)	Elvis Costello	4:33

== Personnel ==
- Elvis Costello – vocals, arranger, composer, multi-instrumentalist

The Imposters

- Steve Nieve – Fender Rhodes, keyboards, Mellotron, piano
- Davey Faragher – bass, vocal arrangement, background vocals
- Pete Thomas – drums, percussion, tambourine

With:

- Sebastian Krys – co-producer, engineer, mixing, percussion, producer
- Burt Bacharach – composer, piano
- Carole King – composer
- Bob Ludwig – mastering
- Steve Bernstein – piccolo trumpet, trumpet
- Cyrus Beroukhim – violin
- Katarzyna Bryla – viola
- Christopher Cardona – viola
- Claire Chan – viola, violin
- Robert Chausow – concertmaster, violin
- Doug Emery – chart, pre-production
- Lawrence Feldman – alto saxophone
- Duarte Figueira – production assistance
- Erik Friedlander – violoncello
- Clark Gayton – trombone, bass trombone
- Juliet Haffner – string contractor, viola
- Sheryl Henze – flute, alto flute, piccolo
- Christopher Komer – French horn
- Tommy Faragher – backing vocals
- Kitten Kuroi – backing vocals
- Briana Lee – backing vocals
- Jeremy Levy – transcription
- Tim Mech – guitar, technician
- Scott Moore – second engineer
- Louise Owen – violin
- Seth Presant – second engineer
- Michael Rabinowitz – bassoon
- Chaz Sexton – second engineer
- Coco Shinomiya – layout
- Antoine Silverman – violin
- Eamonn Singer – illustrations
- Ivy Skoff – production coordination
- Ron Taylor – engineer
- Gosha Usov – second engineer
- Doug Wieselman – alto saxophone, baritone saxophone, tenor saxophone

== Charts ==
Chart (2018)	Peak position
Austrian Albums (Ö3 Austria)	21
Belgian Albums (Ultratop Flanders)	6
Belgian Albums (Ultratop Wallonia)	96
Canadian Albums (Billboard)	62
Dutch Albums (Album Top 100)	35
German Albums (Offizielle Top 100)	32
Portuguese Albums (AFP)	50
Scottish Albums (Official Charts)	8
Spanish Albums (Promusicae)	17
Swedish Albums (Sverigetopplistan)	40
Swiss Albums (Schweizer Hitparade)	37
UK Albums (Official Charts)	14
US Billboard 200	46
