= The Other End (of the Telescope) =

1988 song by 'Til Tuesday

Song by 'Til Tuesday

from the album Everything's Different Now
- Released: 1988
- Length: 3:51
- Label: Epic
- Songwriters: Aimee Mann; Declan MacManus
- Producer: Rhett Davies

"The Other End (of the Telescope)" is a song by American band 'Til Tuesday, which was released in 1988 on their third and final studio album Everything's Different Now. The song was written by Aimee Mann and Elvis Costello. Costello recorded his own version of the song for his 1996 album All This Useless Beauty.

== Writing ==
"The Other End (of the Telescope)" originated with Mann, who wrote the music and her own set of lyrics. She then sent the song to Costello and his main contribution was providing a new set of lyrics. Mann told Ian Ravendale in 1994, "I had this piece of music that I liked and I kind of knew that it had to be very wordy and some kind of long story, and I just couldn't come up with anything. I knew Elvis and, during one of our conversations, I got up my nerve to say, 'If I sent you this song, do you think you could, if you had time, maybe, consider writing some words for it?' And he did very quickly."

Costello told The Guardian in 1996, "[It] was written with Aimee Mann, but we weren't in the room together. It's a bit like the song I wrote with Burt Bacharach recently; what I call mail order songs. Your partner sends you whatever part of the composition you're not writing, in this case the music. Mostly, my contribution was the words. It was specifically written for her and the situation she was in at the time. I kept the intro and then wrote a whole other story." He added in 1998, "Although it now seems a little presumptuous, I tried to find the right words for someone going through a rather unhappy time."

As with a number of tracks on Everything's Different Now, "The Other End (of the Telescope)" was influenced by the end of Mann's relationship with Jules Shear. The song was one that initially bothered Shear when he first heard it. Mann revealed to The Los Angeles Times in 1989, "He likes it now. It bothered him because it was sort of that harsh Elvis vibe. He's actually quite concerned what people think of him on one level."

In a 2018 interview with Stereogum, Mann recalled of her collaboration with Costello, "He's a legend and wildly talented, and I was over the moon to be able to write with him. I mean, I couldn't believe that he even paid me any attention." In addition to "The Other End (of the Telescope)", Mann and Costello have collaborated on a number of other songs, although they remain unreleased. An exception was "The Fall of the World's Own Optimist", written in 1994 and released by Mann on her 2000 album Bachelor No. 2 or, the Last Remains of the Dodo.

== Recording ==
The song was recorded for 'Til Tuesday's third album, Everything's Different Now, with Rhett Davies as the producer. Costello provided backing vocals on the recording. In 1998, Costello said of his appearance on the track, "I'm not sure that it doesn't detract from Aimee's excellent performance."

== Critical reception ==
In a review of Everything's Different Now, Steve Pick of the St. Louis Post-Dispatch wrote, "[The song] is the polished gem I expected, with a delightful tune and some great lyrics playing with the central image of ex-lovers observing each other through the two ends of a telescope, which changes the way each is seen by the other." Jim Bohen of the Daily Record described the song as "a waltz on the order of Costello's 'New Amsterdam' - that is, lyrically intricate and musically lovely".

John Milward of Newsday considered the song to "frame a stormy love affair in a stately, country-ish melody". Brett Milano of The Boston Globe felt the song was the album's "main disappointment". He wrote, "The tune is too easygoing, and Costello's voice sounds as if it wandered in from a different record."

== Personnel ==
'Til Tuesday

- Aimee Mann – vocals, bass and acoustic guitar
- Michael Hausman – drums, percussion, programming
- Robert Holmes – guitar
- Michael Montes – keyboards

Additional personnel

- Elvis Costello – backing vocals

Production

- Rhett Davies – producer
- Bob Ludwig – mastering

== Elvis Costello & The Attractions version ==
"The Other End of the Telescope"

Single by Elvis Costello & The Attractions

from the album All This Useless Beauty
- Released: July 15, 1996
- Length: 4:06
- Label: Warner Bros.
- Songwriters: Elvis Costello; Aimee Mann
- Producers: Geoff Emerick; Elvis Costello

Elvis Costello & The Attractions singles chronology
"Little Atoms" (1996)	"The Other End of the Telescope" (1996)	"Distorted Angel" (1996)

"The Other End of the Telescope" was recorded by Elvis Costello and his band, the Attractions, in 1996 for his seventeenth studio album All This Useless Beauty. It was released as the album's third single and reached No. 86 in the UK Singles Chart in July 1996.

=== Background ===
Costello released his version of "The Other End of the Telescope" as the opening track on All This Useless Beauty. His version features altered and additional lyrics, which Costello wrote "lying on the floor of the studio while the band sat impatiently in the control room". In the liner notes of the 2001 re-issue of the album, Costello said, "This song was co-written with Aimee Mann and it seemed to suit her entirely. The tune, which was Aimee's, was very lovely but I felt that the text needed to be more accusative before I could really make it my own." He added to The Guardian in 1996, "I've always loved the tune and I always wanted to record it."

=== Critical reception ===
In a review of All This Useless Beauty, K. Zimmerman of Gavin Report wrote, "So strong is this Costello/Mann collaboration, that it casts a long shadow across the rest of the album." Jeffrey Demerly of the Journal & Courier wrote, "Costello's voice and Nieve's fine piano playing are really the stars of this record, especially in numbers such as 'The Other End of the Telescope' and 'All This Useless Beauty'."

David Menconi of The News & Observer felt the song "would have sounded right at home" on Costello's "folksy" 1986 album King of America. Shane Danielsen of The Sydney Morning Herald commented, "'The Other End of the Telescope' shows again just how far he's come as a vocalist: using his strengths (a sleek velveteen croon in the lower register; that deep, sudden tremolo) to their fullest, interpreting as well as delivering his convoluted lyrics."

In a 2014 feature on "the 20 best songs by Costello", Ryan J. Prado of Paste picked "The Other End of the Telescope" as No. 8 on his list. He considered the song to "stand as one of the purest bridges between Costello's brief sojourn from bouncier, snottier pop toward the vestige of the soft serenader".

=== Track listing ===
CD single

1. "The Other End of the Telescope" – 4:06
2. "Almost Ideal Eyes" – 4:21
3. "Basement Kiss" (Live in Dublin) – 4:09
4. "Complicated Shadows" (Cashbox Version) – 2:27

=== Personnel ===
Elvis Costello & The Attractions

- Elvis Costello – vocals, guitar
- Steve Nieve – piano, keyboards
- Bruce Thomas – bass
- Pete Thomas – drums

Production

- Geoff Emerick – producer, engineer, mixing
- Elvis Costello – producer
- Jon Jacobs – engineer, mixing
- Bob Ludwig – mastering
- Dave Zamitt – recording and mixing on "Basement Kiss"

=== Charts ===
Chart (1996)	Peak position
UK Singles (Official Charts)	86

== Other versions ==
- In 1996, English rock band Sleeper released their own version of the song, which appeared as a track on the UK CD #2 and Australian releases of their single "Statuesque".
