= Mighty Like a Rose =

Studio album by Elvis Costello
- Released: 14 May 1991
- Recorded: 1990–1991
- Studios: Ocean Way, Hollywood
- Genres: Rock; pop; baroque pop
- Length: 54:19
- Label: Warner Bros.
- Producers: Elvis Costello; Mitchell Froom; Kevin Killen

Elvis Costello chronology
| Spike (1989) | Mighty Like a Rose (1991) | G.B.H. (1991) |

Singles from Mighty Like a Rose
- 1. "The Other Side of Summer" Released: April 1991; 2. "So Like Candy" Released: October 1991

Professional ratings
Review scores
| Source | Rating |
|---|---|
| AllMusic | 2/5 stars |
| Blender | 3/5 stars |
| Chicago Tribune | 2.5/4 stars |
| Christgau's Consumer Guide | C+ |
| Encyclopedia of Popular Music | 4/5 stars |
| Entertainment Weekly | A− |
| Los Angeles Times | 4/4 stars |
| NME | 5/10 |
| Q | 5/5 stars |
| Rolling Stone | 3/5 stars |
| Uncut | 4/5 stars |

Mighty Like a Rose is the 13th studio album by the British rock singer and songwriter Elvis Costello, released in 1991 on compact disc as Warner Brothers 26575. The title is presumably a reference to the pop standard "Mighty Lak' a Rose", and although that song does not appear on the album, the words of its first stanza are quoted in the booklet of the 2002 reissue. It peaked at No. 5 on the UK Albums Chart, and at No. 55 on the Billboard 200.

== Content ==
The album was initially intended to be released under Costello's birth name, Declan MacManus, as the singer had grown tired of the Elvis Costello pseudonym. Record label pressures, however, won the day and the release was as an Elvis Costello record.

Mighty Like a Rose continues in the vein of Costello's previous album Spike from 1989, although with Mitchell Froom taking over the producer's chair from T Bone Burnett. This time, the tracks were recorded in one location, Ocean Way in Hollywood, with orchestral and vocal overdubs taking place at Westside Studios in London. Two more songs from his collaboration with Paul McCartney appear, "Playboy to a Man" and a song selected as a single, "So Like Candy".

Costello refers to this as an angry record, recorded in the aftermath of the Gulf War. The opening track, "The Other Side of Summer" was designed as a Beach Boys pastiche after their style in the early 1970s. The track "Invasion Hit Parade" features a trumpet solo by Costello's father, Ross MacManus. The album also features "Broken", a song written by his wife at the time, Cait O'Riordan, to whom the album is dedicated.

The lead single, "The Other Side of Summer", peaked at No. 43 on the UK Singles Chart. Although it missed the Billboard Hot 100 in the US, it reached No. 1 on the Modern Rock Tracks chart and No. 40 on the Album Rock Tracks chart. The second single, "So Like Candy", did not chart in either nation.

== Release history ==
The album was released initially on compact disc in 1991. As part of the Rhino Records reissue campaign for Costello's back catalogue from Demon/Columbia and Warners, it was re-released in 2002 with 17 additional tracks on a bonus disc. Several of these were recorded at Costello's home.

== Track listing ==
All tracks are written by Declan MacManus, unless otherwise indicated.

Side one
| No. | Title | Writer(s) | Length |
|---|---|---|---|
| 1. | "The Other Side of Summer" | | 3:56 |
| 2. | "Hurry Down Doomsday (The Bugs Are Taking Over)" | MacManus, Jim Keltner | 4:05 |
| 3. | "How to Be Dumb" | | 5:14 |
| 4. | "All Grown Up" | | 4:16 |
| 5. | "Invasion Hit Parade" | | 5:34 |
| 6. | "Harpies Bizarre" | | 3:44 |
| 7. | "After the Fall" | | 4:38 |

Side two
| No. | Title | Writer(s) | Length |
|---|---|---|---|
| 8. | "Georgie and Her Riva" | | 3:38 |
| 9. | "So Like Candy" | Paul McCartney, MacManus | 4:36 |
| 10. | "Interlude: Couldn't Call It Unexpected No. 2" | | 0:22 |
| 11. | "Playboy to a Man" | McCartney, MacManus | 3:20 |
| 12. | "Sweet Pear" | | 3:36 |
| 13. | "Broken" | Cait O'Riordan | 3:37 |
| 14. | "Couldn't Call It Unexpected No. 4" | | 3:50 |
| Total length: | | | 54:19 |

2002 Rhino reissue bonus disc
| No. | Title | Writer(s) | Length |
|---|---|---|---|
| 1. | "Just Another Mystery" | | 4:15 |
| 2. | "Sweet Pear" (Home Demo) | | 3:46 |
| 3. | "Couldn't Call It Unexpected No. 4" (B-Side to "So Like Candy", recorded live at Great Woods Center for the Performing Arts 21 June 1991) | | 4:18 |
| 4. | "Mischievous Ghost" (With Mary Coughlan, from the BBC Records various artists compilation Bringing It All Back Home) | | 5:47 |
| 5. | "St. Stephen's Day Murders" (with The Chieftains, from The Chieftains album The Bells of Dublin) | Costello, Paddy Moloney | 3:25 |
| 6. | "The Other Side of Summer" (Live on MTV Unplugged 3 June 1991) | | 4:06 |
| 7. | "Deep Dark Truthful Mirror" (From the Various Artists compilation The Unplugged Collection, Volume 1) | | 4:43 |
| 8. | "Hurry Down Doomsday (The Bugs Are Taking Over)" (MTV Unplugged 3 June 1991, B-Side to "So Like Candy") | Costello, Keltner | 4:18 |
| 9. | "All Grown Up" (Home Demo) | | 4:36 |
| 10. | "Georgie and Her Rival" (Home Demo) | | 3:22 |
| 11. | "Forgive Her Anything" (Home Demo) | | 4:02 |
| 12. | "It Started to Come to Me" (Home Demo) | | 2:48 |
| 13. | "I Still Miss Someone/The Last Town I Painted" (Demo) | Johnny Cash/Roy Cash Jr., Buddy Word | 2:47 |
| 14. | "Put Your Big Toe in the Milk of Human Kindness" (with Marc Ribot & Rob Wasserman, from the Rob Wasserman album Trios) | | 4:10 |
| 15. | "Invasion Hit Parade" (Home Demo) | | 4:21 |
| 16. | "Just Another Mystery" (Home Demo) | | 3:43 |
| 17. | "Broken" (Home Demo) | O'Riordan | 3:22 |

== Personnel ==
- Declan MacManus – acoustic guitar, bass guitar, electric guitar, maracas, keyboards
- Mitchell Froom – organ, celeste, harmonium
- Larry Knechtel – organ, piano, Hammond organ, clavinet
- Marc Ribot – guitar, cornet, rhythm guitar, horn
- Jerry Scheff – electric bass, electric guitar
- Jim Keltner – drums, percussion

=== Additional personnel ===
- Lionel Batiste – drums
- Nicholas Bucknall – clarinet
- James Burton – acoustic guitar
- Gregory Davis – trumpet
- Andre Findon – flute
- Steve George – backing vocals
- Charles Joseph – trombone
- Kirk Joseph – tuba
- Roger Lewis – baritone saxophone
- Ross MacManus – trumpet
- Jenell Marshall – drums, percussion
- Richard Morgan – oboe
- Steve Nieve – keyboards
- Richard Page – backing vocals
- Simon Rayner – french horn
- Steven Soles – backing vocals
- Benmont Tench – piano
- Pete Thomas – drums, percussion, castanets, tambourine, bells
- Efrem Towns – trumpet
- Rob Wasserman – electric bass
- Tom "T-Bone" Wolk – bass

== Charts ==
| Chart (1991) | Peak position |
|---|---|
| UK Albums Chart | 5 |
| The Billboard 200 | 55 |

Singles

| Year | Single | Chart | Position |
|---|---|---|---|
| 1991 | "The Other Side of Summer" | UK Singles Chart | 43 |
| 1991 | "The Other Side of Summer" | Billboard Mainstream Rock Tracks | 40 |
| 1991 | "The Other Side of Summer" | Billboard Modern Rock Tracks | 1 |
