= All This Useless Beauty =

1996 studio album by Elvis Costello and the Attractions

Studio album by Elvis Costello and the Attractions
- Released: 14 May 1996
- Recorded: 1995–1996
- Length: 48:21
- Label: Warner Bros.
- Producers: Geoff Emerick, Elvis Costello

Elvis Costello and the Attractions chronology
Deep Dead Blue (1995)	All This Useless Beauty (1996)	Costello & Nieve (1996)

Singles from All This Useless Beauty
- 1. "It's Time" Released: April 1996; 2. "Little Atoms" Released: July 1996; 3. "The Other End of the Telescope" Released: July 1996; 4. "Distorted Angel" Released: July 1996; 5. "All This Useless Beauty" Released: July 1996; 6. "You Bowed Down" Released: September 1996 (US)

Professional ratings
Review scores
Source	Rating
AllMusic	3.5/5 stars
Chicago Tribune	3.5/4 stars
Encyclopedia of Popular Music	3/5 stars
Entertainment Weekly	A−
The Guardian	4/5 stars
Los Angeles Times	3/4 stars
NME	7/10
Pitchfork	7.5/10
Q	4/5 stars
Rolling Stone	4/5 stars
Uncut	4/5 stars

All This Useless Beauty is the seventeenth studio album by the English singer-songwriter Elvis Costello, released in 1996 by Warner Bros. Records. It is his tenth and final album with his long-standing backing band the Attractions, and the last album he delivered under his contract to the Warner Bros. label, his contract expiring with a further compilation album, Extreme Honey. It peaked at number 28 on the UK album chart, and at number 53 on the Billboard 200.

== Content ==
In its original conception, the album was to be a two-disc set of songs written for other artists, entitled A Case for Song, with backing by a diverse array of musicians, influenced by his participation in the 1995 Meltdown Festival. Aspects of this concept survived to the final album, as four songs previously released by others made it to the final track listing: "The Other End of the Telescope", co-written with Aimee Mann and originally recorded by 'Til Tuesday; "You Bowed Down", recorded by Roger McGuinn; "All This Useless Beauty" and "I Want to Vanish", recorded by June Tabor. The title is a sarcastic reference to what Costello thought would be the fate of the album.

Instead, Costello hired the Attractions, and recorded the songs at Windmill Lane Studios in Dublin and Westside Studios in London with production by Geoff Emerick and engineering by Jon Jacobs. "Complicated Shadows" had been intended for Johnny Cash, and "Why Can't A Man Stand Alone?" for Sam Moore, but neither singer elected to record them. Another of his collaborations with Paul McCartney appears, "Shallow Grave".

Unusually, six tracks were released as singles in either the United Kingdom or the United States; "It's Time", "Little Atoms", "The Other End of the Telescope", "Distorted Angel", "All This Useless Beauty" and "You Bowed Down". Four of these—"Little Atoms", "The Other End of the Telescope", "Distorted Angel", and "All This Useless Beauty"—were released the same month as part of a limited-time promotion campaign, with each single featuring covers of songs from the album by other artists, such as Lush, Sleeper, and Tricky. Costello, who described the release as a "pop art project" where each single was deleted one week after its initial launch, explained:

It's like leaving trails everywhere. What it is it's fun. The danger of making a record, particularly one that reconsiders older material, is that it's too easy to define. Inside the easy definition, there's all this life, melodies, ideas, loads of things. There's a danger of putting music like this into a glass case, and I refuse to do that.

"It's Time" charted at number 58 in the UK, while all of the four limited promotional releases but "Distorted Angel" reached the 90s on the UK charts. "You Bowed Down" reached number eight on the Billboard Adult Alternative Songs chart.

== Release history ==
The album was released initially on compact disc, cassette & LP in 1996. As part of the Rhino Records reissue campaign for Costello's back catalogue from Demon/Columbia and Warners, it was re-released in 2001 with 17 additional tracks on a bonus disc. Additional tracks continued the album's initial concept, tracks intended for recording by or in collaboration with other artists. "The Days Take Care of Themselves" and "The Comedians" had been written for Roy Orbison, his recording of the latter appearing on Mystery Girl, while "The Only Flame in Town" had been intended for Aaron Neville. "The World's Great Optimist", another collaboration with Aimee Mann, appeared on her Bachelor No. 2 album (as "The Fall of the World's Own Optimist"), and Johnny Cash recorded "Hidden Shame" on Boom Chicka Boom (1990). This reissue is out of print, the album reissued again by Universal Music Group after its acquisition of Costello's complete catalogue in 2006.

== Track listing ==
All tracks are written by Elvis Costello, unless otherwise indicated.

No.	Title	Writer(s)	Length
1.	"The Other End of the Telescope"	Costello, Aimee Mann	4:06
2.	"Little Atoms"		3:58
3.	"All This Useless Beauty"		4:39
4.	"Complicated Shadows"		4:43
5.	"Why Can't a Man Stand Alone?"		3:14
6.	"Distorted Angel"		4:31
7.	"Shallow Grave"	MacManus, Paul McCartney	2:07
8.	"Poor Fractured Atlas"		4:02
9.	"Starting to Come to Me"		2:43
10.	"You Bowed Down"		4:55
11.	"It's Time"		6:00
12.	"I Want to Vanish"		3:16
Total length:			48:21

2001 Rhino Records Bonus Disc
No.	Title	Writer(s)	Length
1.	"Almost Ideal Eyes" (B-side to "Little Atoms" in the UK & "You Bowed Down" in the US)		4:23
2.	"My Dark Life" (with Brian Eno, from Songs in the Key of X: Music from and Inspired by the X-Files)		6:25
3.	"That Day Is Done" (from I Couldn't Hear Nobody Pray with The Fairfield Four)	MacManus, McCartney	5:11
4.	"What Do I Do Now?" (Home demo, from the various artists collection 17 Volume (Fifth Birthday Bumper Bonanza!))	Louise Wener	4:29
5.	"The Bridge I Burned" (from Extreme Honey: The Very Best of the Warner Brothers Years)		5:23
6.	"It's Time" (Solo Demo)		4:00
7.	"Complicated Shadows" (Solo Demo)		2:27
8.	"You Bowed Down" (Demo, with The Attractions)		4:21
9.	"Mistress and Mai" (Demo)	MacManus, McCartney	2:20
10.	"Distorted Angel" (Demo)		2:33
11.	"World's Great Optimist" (Demo)	Costello, Mann	2:34
12.	"The Only Flame in Town" (Demo)		4:14
13.	"The Comedians" (Demo)		3:09
14.	"The Days Take Care of Everything" (Demo)		4:00
15.	"Hidden Shame" (Demo)		3:59
16.	"Why Can't a Man Stand Alone" (Demo)		3:01
17.	"Distorted Angel" (Tricky remix, B-side to "All This Useless Beauty" in the US & "You Bowed Down" in the UK)		5:35

== Personnel ==
- Elvis Costello – vocals, guitars, bass, piano, other instruments

The Attractions

- Steve Nieve – piano, keyboards, drum programming (on "It's Time")
- Bruce Thomas – bass
- Pete Thomas – drums, percussion, acoustic guitar (on "You Bowed Down")

Additional musicians

- Peter Whyman – bass clarinet (on "All This Useless Beauty" and "I Want to Vanish")
- Roy Babbington – double bass (on "All This Useless Beauty" and "I Want to Vanish")
- Brodsky Quartet – string quartet (on "I Want to Vanish")
- Ruth Causey – clarinet (on "I Want to Vanish")
- Brian Eno – gadgets (on "My Dark Life")
- The Fairfield Four – vocals (on "That Day Is Done")
- Larry Knechtel – piano (on "That Day Is Done")
- Matt MacManus – Fender bass, drum loop (on "The Bridge I Burned")
- Danny Goffey – drums (on "The Bridge I Burned")
- Ned Douglas – sample control (on "The Bridge I Burned")

== Charts ==
Chart performance for All This Useless Beauty
Chart (1996)	Peak position
Australian Albums (ARIA)	98
US Billboard 200	53

Single

Year	Title	Chart	Position
1996	"It's Time"	UK Singles Chart	58
