= Pete Thomas (drummer) =

British musician (born 1954)

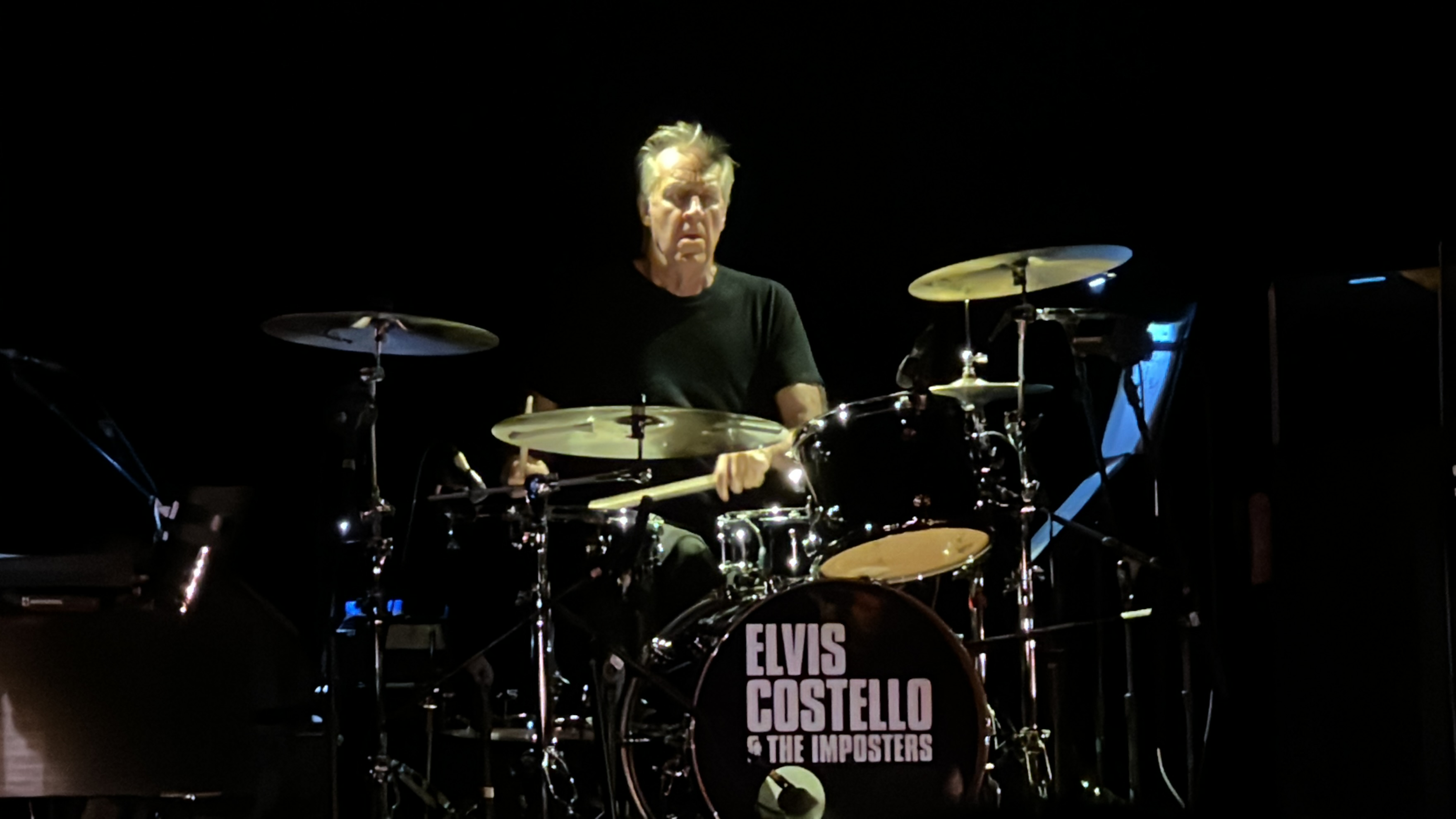
- Thomas performing with Elvis Costello and The Imposters in 2021

Background information
- Born: Peter Michael Thomas; 9 August 1954 (age 72)
- Origin: Hillsborough, Sheffield, South Yorkshire, England
- Genres: Punk rock; new wave; ska
- Occupation: Musician
- Instrument: Drums
- Years active: 1971–present
- Labels: Stiff; Radar; F-Beat; Demon; Columbia; Warner Bros.; Mercury; Island; Lost Highway; Verve; HearMusic; Rykodisc; Rhino; Hip-O

Peter Michael Thomas (born 9 August 1954) is an English rock drummer best known for his collaboration with singer Elvis Costello, both as a member of his band the Attractions and with Costello as a solo artist. Besides his lengthy career as a studio musician and touring drummer, he has been a member of the band Squeeze during the 1990s and a member of the supergroup Works Progress Administration during the early 2000s.

Tom Waits has referred to him as "one of the best rock drummers alive."

== Career ==
Thomas states that his favourite album and greatest influence is Are You Experienced by The Jimi Hendrix Experience. He first heard the album at the age of 14, and became greatly influenced by Jimi Hendrix Experience drummer Mitch Mitchell. Thomas met his drumming hero as a teenager, after waiting outside Mitchell's house for multiple days.

Following early work with Chilli Willi and the Red Hot Peppers and John Stewart, Thomas was recruited as a member of Costello's backing band the Attractions in 1977. Elvis Costello & the Attractions would spend the next decade touring the world, and recording nine albums, from This Year's Model (1978) to Blood and Chocolate (1986).

Although Costello split with the Attractions between 1987 and 1993, he continued to work regularly with Thomas during this period. Thomas played drums on the albums Spike (1989), Mighty Like a Rose (1991), and Kojak Variety (recorded in 1990 but not released until 1995) and was a member of Costello's 1989–1991 touring band, The Rude 5.

Costello reunited with the Attractions for the albums Brutal Youth (1994) and All This Useless Beauty (1996).

In 2001, Costello recruited Thomas, Faragher, and fellow Attraction Steve Nieve to record the album that became When I Was Cruel (2002). Elvis Costello & the Imposters, as they were subsequently named, have gone on to tour extensively, and recorded the album The Delivery Man (2004). From 2008 until 2010, Thomas was a member of the house band for Costello's television program Spectacle: Elvis Costello with...

Thomas lives in Los Angeles, with his wife Judy. Their daughter Tennessee is drummer for the band the Like. In 2003, Thomas was inducted into the Rock and Roll Hall of Fame as a member of Elvis Costello & the Attractions.

In summer 2015, Thomas hit the road as drummer for the summer tour of the folk-pop duo the Weepies.

=== Studio work ===
Over the years Thomas has been an in-demand session musician. His many credits include drums for Graham Parker's 1991 album Struck by Lightning and 1992 album Burning Questions.

After Costello split with the Attractions for a second time, Thomas worked for the next few years primarily as a session drummer, recording with such artists as Suzanne Vega, Neil Finn, Richard Thompson, Vonda Shepard, Mikel Erentxun, Sheryl Crow, Fito Páez, Joaquín Sabina, Los Lobos, Wild Colonials, Matt Brown of 3 lb. Thrill, Wendy James, Tasmin Archer and John Paul Jones.

In 1993, Thomas joined the band Squeeze for their album Some Fantastic Place, replacing Gilson Lavis on drums, and for the tour in support of it.

In 1994, Thomas was part of a trio that included vocalist/avant garde opera diva Diamanda Galás and former Led Zeppelin bassist/multi-instrumentalist John Paul Jones, who recorded the album The Sporting Life.

He also played on the Elliott Smith album Figure 8 (DreamWorks, 2000), on the songs "Junk Bond Trader", "Wouldn't Mama Be Proud?" and "Can't Make a Sound".

Thomas currently plays local Los Angeles gigs with bassist Davey Faragher and guitarist Val McCallum, under the band name Jackshit.

In 2006, Thomas played drums on the album Doomed to Make Choices by Jason Karaban. He also plays drums on Karaban's album Sobriety Kills (2009) and Karaban's single "Succeed 101" (2009).

In 2008, he joined a new eight-piece supergroup, Works Progress Administration, with Sean Watkins (guitar), his sister Sara Watkins (fiddle), Glen Phillips (guitar, vocals), Benmont Tench (piano), Luke Bulla (fiddle), Greg Leisz (various), and Davey Faragher (bass). The group released their debut album on 28 August 2009. Thomas played on Willy DeVille's Pistola album in 2008.

In June 2008, Thomas recorded for a Kina Grannis album. In 2009 Thomas recorded for a Fito & Fitipaldis album titled Antes de que Cuente Diez.

In 2012, Thomas was the drummer on two national tours by artist Tammy Lang: the "Chelsea Madchen" tour, in which the singer parodied Nico, of Velvet Underground fame, and her outing as subversive traditional country-and-western alter ego Tammy Faye Starlite. Violinist Lisa Germano also played on both tours, as did bandleader/guitarist Peter "Petey" Andrews. The band "played some of the best blues rock music I've heard in years," wrote Huffington Post music correspondent Wendy Block.

In 2013, Thomas appeared on Arctic Monkeys' album, AM, on the song "Mad Sounds". The band described him as "saving the day" when their usual drummer Matt Helders broke his hand after punching a wall while drunk during recording sessions for the album.

In October 2013, he appeared on Later... with Jools Holland as drummer for Jake Bugg.

In 2014, Thomas played drums and percussion on most tracks of Down Where the Spirit Meets the Bone for Lucinda Williams.

In 2015, Thomas played drums and percussion on award-winning Canadian singer-songwriter Leeroy Stagger's critically acclaimed album Love Versus.

In 2019 Thomas co-founded the Los Angeles-based Old Man Dinner Band with Harvey Shield.

== Collaborations ==
With Tasmin Archer

- Bloom (EMI, 1996)

With Tracy Bonham

- Down Here (Island Records, 2000)

With Jackson Browne

- Standing in the Breach (Inside Recordings, 2014)
- Downhill from Everywhere (Inside Recordings, 2021)

With Jonatha Brooke

- Steady Pull (Bad Dog Records, 2001)

With Johnny Cash

- Rockabilly Blues (Columbia Records, 1980)

With Elvis Costello

- This Year's Model (Columbia Records, 1978)
- Armed Forces (Columbia Records, 1979)
- Get Happy!! (Columbia Records, 1980)
- Trust (Columbia Records, 1981)
- Almost Blue (F-Beat Records, 1981)
- Imperial Bedroom (F-Beat Records, 1982)
- Punch the Clock (F-Beat Records, 1983)
- Goodbye Cruel World (F-Beat Records, 1984)
- King of America (F-Beat Records, 1986)
- Blood & Chocolate (Columbia Records, 1986)
- Spike (Warner Bros. Records, 1989)
- Mighty Like a Rose (Warner Bros. Records, 1991)
- Brutal Youth (Warner Bros. Records, 1994)
- Kojak Variety (Warner Bros. Records, 1995)
- All This Useless Beauty (Warner Bros. Records, 1996)
- When I Was Cruel (Mercury Records, 2002)
- North (Deutsche Grammophon, 2003)
- The Delivery Man (Lost Highway Records, 2004)
- The River in Reverse (Verve Forecast, 2006)
- Momofuku (Lost Highway Records, 2008)
- National Ransom (Universal Records, 2010)
- Look Now (Concord Records, 2018)
- The Boy Named If (Capitol Records, 2022)

With Sheryl Crow

- Sheryl Crow (A&M Records, 1996)

With Willy DeVille

- Pistola (Eagle Records, 2008)

With Kat Edmonson

- The Big Picture (Sony, 2014)

With Neil Finn

- Try Whistling This (Parlophone Records, 1998)

With Jeffrey Gaines

- Alright (Omnivore Recordings, 2018)

With John Wesley Harding

- Here Comes the Groom (Sire, 1990)
- The Name Above the Title (Sire, 1991)

With Susanna Hoffs

- Someday (Baroque Folk, 2012)

With Rickie Lee Jones

- The Evening of My Best Day (V2 Records, 2003)
- The Sermon on Exposition Boulevard (New West Records, 2007)
- Balm in Gilead (Fantasy Records, 2009)

With Juanes

- Origen (Universal Music, 2021)

With Amos Lee

- Supply and Demand (Blue Note Records, 2006)

With Nick Lowe

- Jesus of Cool (Radar Records, 1977)
- Labour of Lust (Radar Records, 1978)
- Pinker and Prouder Than Previous (Columbia Records, 1988)

With Billie Myers

- Vertigo (Universal, 2000)

With Randy Newman

- Bad Love (DreamWorks Records, 1999)
- Harps and Angels (Nonesuch Records, 2008)

With Daniel Powter

- Daniel Powter (Warner Bros. Records, 2005)

With Bonnie Raitt

- Fundamental (Capitol Records, 1998)
- Silver Lining (Capitol Records, 2002)

With Ron Sexsmith

- Whereabouts (Interscope Records, 1999)
- Time Being (V2 Records, 2006)
- Forever Endeavour (Cooking Vinyl, 2013)

With Vonda Shepard

- By 7:30 (Jacket Records, 1999)
- Chinatown (Edel Records, 2002)

With Michelle Shocked

- Mexican Standoff (Mighty Sound Records, 2005)

With Nancy Sinatra

- Nancy Sinatra (Attack Records, 2004)

With Josh Smith

- Burn to Grow (Vizztone, 2018)

With Matthew Sweet

- Altered Beast (Zoo Entertainment, 1993)

With Richard Thompson

- Mirror Blue (Capitol Records, 1994)
- You? Me? Us? (Capitol Records, 1996)

With Teddy Thompson

- Little Windows (Cooking Vinyl Records, 2016)

With Rufus Wainwright

- Poses (DreamWorks Records, 2001)
- Folkocracy (BMG, 2023)

With Dan Wilson

- Re-Covered (Ballroom Music, 2017)

With Rita Wilson

- Rita Wilson (Sing It Out Records, 2016)

With Elliott Smith

- Figure 8 on "Junk Bond Trader" (DreamWorks, 2000)
