= Veronica (song) =

Single by Elvis Costello

from the album Spike
- B-side: "You're No Good" / "The Room Nobody Lives In" (12" single only)
- Released: 20 February 1989
- Recorded: 1987–1988
- Genre: Pop rock; baroque pop; chamber pop; jangle pop
- Length: 3:09
- Label: Warner Bros.
- Songwriters: Elvis Costello, Paul McCartney
- Producers: Elvis Costello, Kevin Killen, T-Bone Burnett

Elvis Costello singles chronology
"A Town Called Big Nothing" (1987)	"Veronica" (1989)	"Baby Plays Around EP" (1989)

"Veronica" is a song by Elvis Costello, released in 1989 as the lead single from his album Spike. The song was co-written by Costello with Paul McCartney, was co-produced with T-Bone Burnett and Kevin Killen, and features McCartney on his iconic Höfner bass. In 2004, Entertainment Weekly voted it one of Costello's "10 Greatest Tunes".

"Veronica" was also Costello's highest-charting top 40 hit in the United States, peaking at No. 19 on the Billboard Hot 100 singles chart, No. 1 on its Hot Modern Rock Tracks chart, and No. 10 on its Mainstream Rock Tracks chart.

== Background ==
The song focuses on an older woman who has experienced severe memory loss. Costello's inspiration for this song was his grandmother, who suffered from Alzheimer's. When talking about the song on a VH1 interview, Costello reminisced about his grandmother having "terrifying moments of lucidity" and how this was the inspiration for "Veronica". In his 2015 autobiography, Unfaithful Music & Disappearing Ink, Costello wrote of his collaboration with McCartney, "I'd brought an early version of 'Veronica' that you would have recognized. . . . All the words I'd already written were about my paternal grandmother, Molly, or more formally, Mabel Josephine Jackson. In fact, her Catholic confirmation name, Veronica, provided the very title of the song."

== Non-album B-sides ==
The single featured multiple covers as B-sides, both of which were later released on the 2001 bonus disc to Spike.

- "You're No Good" - 7"
- "The Room Nobody Lives In" - 12"

== Music video ==
"Veronica" and its accompanying video depicts an aged woman, probably nearing the end of her life in a retirement home, engaging in detached reminiscences from her life from young girl to young womanhood (played by Zoe Carides). The video for "Veronica" featured Costello delivering a spoken-word monologue to the camera, and occasionally singing the song softly over the original vocal track from the recording. The video, co-directed by John Hillcoat and Evan English, earned an MTV Video Music Award for Best Male Video.

== Charts ==
Chart (1989)	Peak position
Australian Singles Chart	27
Canadian Singles Chart	64
Dutch Singles Chart	54
Irish Singles Chart	22
Italy Airplay (Music & Media)	2
UK Singles Chart	31
US Billboard Hot 100	19
US Album Rock Tracks (Billboard)	10
US Alternative Airplay (Billboard)	1

== See also ==
- List of Billboard Modern Rock Tracks number ones of the 1980s
