= Spike (Elvis Costello album) =

Studio album by Elvis Costello
- Released: 6 February 1989
- Recorded: 1987–1988
- Studios: Ocean Way (Hollywood); Southland (New Orleans); Windmill Lane (Dublin); AIR (London)
- Genres: Rock; baroque pop
- Length: 63:50
- Label: Warner Bros.
- Producers: Elvis Costello; Kevin Killen; T-Bone Burnett

Elvis Costello chronology
Out of Our Idiot (1987)	Spike (1989)	Mighty Like a Rose (1991)

Singles from Spike
- 1. "Veronica" Released: February 1989; 2. "Baby Plays Around" Released: May 1989

Professional ratings
Review scores
Source	Rating
AllMusic	3.5/5 stars
Blender	4/5 stars
Chicago Tribune	3/4 stars
Entertainment Weekly	C+
Los Angeles Times	3.5/4 stars
NME	10/10
Q	5/5 stars
Rolling Stone	4/5 stars
Uncut	2/5 stars
The Village Voice	B

Spike is the 12th studio album by English singer-songwriter Elvis Costello, released in 1989 by Warner Bros. Records. It was his first album for the label and first release since My Aim Is True with no appearance by the Attractions. It peaked at No. 5 on the UK Albums Chart and also reached the Billboard 200 at No. 32, thanks to the single and his most notable American hit, "Veronica", which reached No. 19 on the Billboard Hot 100 and No. 1 on the US Modern Rock chart. In The Village Voice's annual Pazz & Jop critics poll for the year's best albums, Spike finished at No. 7.

== Content ==
In 1987, Costello began writing with Paul McCartney for the latter's Flowers in the Dirt album. They composed a dozen songs together, which showed up on multiple albums by McCartney and Costello. Two of those songs appear on this album, "Pads, Paws and Claws" and the hit single "Veronica".

As his first album for a new label, in his own words Costello had the budget of "a small independent movie", and having in mind the blueprint for five albums, decided to make all of them. He brought back his foil from King of America, T-Bone Burnett, to facilitate the sessions and produce the album. Studio time was booked in four locations: Ocean Way in Hollywood; Southlake Studios in New Orleans; Windmill Lane Studios in Dublin; and AIR Studios in London. Four different groups of musicians were assembled in each location. Writing credits on the album are given to both Elvis Costello and Declan MacManus, Costello's birth name.

The single "Veronica" peaked at No. 31 on the UK singles chart and at No. 19 in America, his best showing ever on the Billboard Hot 100. It also reached No. 1 on the US Modern Rock chart. "This Town" was also released as a single but missed both of the main singles chart in both nations. An extended play single was also released for "Baby Plays Around", peaking at No. 65 in the UK.

The second track, "Let Him Dangle", is a protest song opposing capital punishment, recounting the 1953 conviction and execution of Derek Bentley.

The seventh track, "Tramp the Dirt Down", is a fiery lament, depicting Costello's anger at the Thatcher government and its effect on Britain's society. In the song, Costello expresses his desire to live long enough to see Margaret Thatcher die and vows, "I'll stand on your grave and tramp the dirt down." "I wish I'd written 'Tramp the Dirt Down'," said singer Natalie Merchant. The song reached No. 79 on the iTunes chart following Thatcher's death in April 2013. In addition, he played this song at Glastonbury 2013 having previously performed it there on the Pyramid Stage in 1987.

Lyrics are given in the booklet for the eighth track, "Stalin Malone", but the album recording is an instrumental and does not include vocals. A version with a recitation of the lyrics as poetry appears on the 2001 bonus disc.

== Artwork ==
The album cover was designed by Jeri and John Heiden. Costello described the image to the BBC in 1989: "I had this image of the beloved entertainer in captivity, as we see him now hung up on the wall. That's kind of what the record companies do now; they go out and shoot their artists and hang them up like a trophy in the boardroom."

== Release history ==
The album was released initially on compact disc in 1989. As part of the Rhino Records reissue campaign for Costello's back catalogue from Demon/Columbia and Warners, it was re-released in 2001 with 17 additional tracks on a bonus disc. The bonus disc included three tracks with Nick Lowe on bass and Attractions drummer Pete Thomas for use as b-sides, recorded at Wessex Sound Studios after the Spike mixing sessions.

== Track listing ==
All tracks are written by Elvis Costello, except where noted.

No.	Title	Writer(s)	Length
1.	"...This Town..."		4:32
2.	"Let Him Dangle"		4:45
3.	"Deep Dark Truthful Mirror"		4:07
4.	"Veronica"	Costello, Paul McCartney	3:09
5.	"God's Comic"		5:31
6.	"Chewing Gum"		3:47
7.	"Tramp the Dirt Down"		5:41
8.	"Stalin Malone"		4:09
9.	"Satellite"		5:45
10.	"Pads, Paws and Claws"	Costello, McCartney	2:56
11.	"Baby Plays Around"	Costello, Cait O'Riordan	2:47
12.	"Miss Macbeth"		4:23
13.	"Any King's Shilling"		6:07
14.	"Coal-Train Robberies"		3:18
15.	"Last Boat Leaving"		3:31
Total length:			63:50

Note: "Coal-Train Robberies" is excluded from single-LP editions of the album. Appears on the CD single of "Veronica".

2001 Rhino Rerelease Bonus Disc
No.	Title	Writer(s)	Length
1.	"Miss Macbeth" (Demo, recorded at Eden Studios, London 16 February 1988)		3:51
2.	"...This Town..." (Demo)		3:50
3.	"Deep Dark Truthful Mirror" (Demo)		4:07
4.	"Coal Train Robberies" (Demo)		2:52
5.	"Satellite" (Demo)		4:50
6.	"Pads, Paws and Claws" (Demo, recorded at Windmill Lane Studios, May 1987)	Costello, McCartney	2:08
7.	"Let Him Dangle" (Demo)		3:39
8.	"Veronica" (Demo, B-side to "So Like Candy" single)	Costello, McCartney	3:03
9.	"Tramp the Dirt Down" (Demo)		5:19
10.	"Baby Plays Around" (Demo)	Costello, O'Riordan	2:42
11.	"Put Your Big Toe in the Milk of Human Kindness" (Demo, Eden Studios, 19 January 1988)		3:17
12.	"Last Boat Leaving" (Demo)		3:29
13.	"The Ugly Things" (B-side to "This Town" single)	Nick Lowe	2:56
14.	"You're No Good" (B-side to "Veronica" single)	Clint Ballard, Jr.	2:22
15.	"Point of No Return" (B-side to "Baby Plays Around" single)	Gerry Goffin, Carole King	2:34
16.	"The Room Nobody Lives In" (from the 12" & CD single of "Veronica")	John Sebastian	4:46
17.	"Stalin Malone" (Vocal Version)		3:12

== Personnel ==
- Elvis Costello – vocals, acoustic guitar, bass guitar, electric guitar, mandolin, piano, bells, acoustic bass guitar, organ, melodica
- T Bone Burnett – acoustic guitar, bass, national steel guitar
- Cait O'Riordan – maracas, bells

=== Dublin ===
- Derek Bell – Irish harp, hammered dulcimer
- Frankie Gavin – fiddle
- Dónal Lunny – acoustic guitar, bouzouki, electric bouzouki
- Davy Spillane – pipe, uilleann pipes, Low whistle
- Steve Wickham – fiddle
- Christy Moore – bodhran
- Pete Thomas – drums

=== New Orleans ===
- Lionel Batiste – bass drum
- Gregory Davis – trumpet
- Willie Green – drums
- Kevin Harris – tenor saxophone
- Charles Joseph – trombone
- Kirk Joseph – sousaphone
- Roger Lewis – baritone saxophone, soprano saxophone
- Jenell Marshall – snare drum
- Allen Toussaint – grand piano
- Efrem Towns – trumpet

=== Hollywood ===
- Michael Blair – glockenspiel, marimba, tambourine, xylophone, bells, timpani, vibraphone, Chinese drums, Oldsmobile hubcap, Parade drum, anvil, whiplash, crash-box, temple bells, snare drum, "magic table", metal pipe, "Martian dog bark"
- Ralph Forbes – electric drums, drum programming
- Mitchell Froom – organ, harmonium, electric piano, chamberlin, Indian harmonium
- Roger McGuinn – twelve-string guitar, Rickenbacker bass guitar
- Jim Keltner – tom-toms, snare drum, Chinese cymbal
- Jerry Marotta – drums
- Buell Neidlinger – cello, double bass
- Marc Ribot – banjo, electric guitar, Spanish guitar, sounds
- Jerry Scheff – electric bass, double bass, fuzz bass
- Benmont Tench – piano, clavinet, spinet, Vox Continental
- Tom "T Bone" Wolk – accordion, bass

=== London ===
- Chrissie Hynde – harmony vocals
- Nick Lowe – bass
- Paul McCartney – Hofner bass guitar, Rickenbacker bass guitar
- Pete Thomas – drums

== Charts ==
=== Weekly charts ===
Chart (1989)	Peak position
Australian Albums Chart	26
Dutch Mega Albums Chart	19
Japanese Albums Chart	61
New Zealand Albums Chart	34
Swedish Albums Chart	13
UK Albums Chart	5
US Billboard 200	32

=== Year-end charts ===
Chart (1989)	Position
US Billboard 200	82

=== Singles ===
Year	Single	Chart	Peak position
1989	"Veronica"	Billboard Hot 100	19
1989	"Veronica"	Billboard Alternative Songs	1
1989	"Veronica"	UK Singles Chart	31
1989	"Veronica"	Australian Singles Chart	27

== Certifications ==
Region	Certification	Certified units/sales
United Kingdom (BPI)	Gold	100,000^{^}
United States (RIAA)	Gold	500,000^{^}
^{^} Shipments figures based on certification alone.
