= From a Whisper to a Scream =

From a Whisper to a Scream may refer to:

- "From a Whisper to a Scream", a 1970 song by Allen Toussaint from the album Toussaint
- From a Whisper to a Scream, a 1971 album by Esther Phillips
- "From a Whisper to a Scream" (song), a 1981 song by Elvis Costello
- From a Whisper to a Scream (film), a 1987 horror film
- "From a Whisper to a Scream" (Grey's Anatomy), an episode of Grey's Anatomy

== See also ==
- "Whisper to a Scream", a 1983 song by The Icicle Works
