= The River in Reverse =

Studio album by Elvis Costello and Allen Toussaint
- Released: 6 June 2006
- Recorded: 27 November – 10 December 2005
- Genres: R&B; jazz; soul
- Length: 53:01
- Label: Verve Forecast
- Producer: Joe Henry

Elvis Costello chronology
My Flame Burns Blue (2006)	The River in Reverse (2006)	Momofuku (2008)

Allen Toussaint chronology
I Believe to My Soul (2005)	The River in Reverse (2006)	The Bright Mississippi (2009)

Professional ratings
Review scores
Source	Rating
AllMusic	link
Being There	link
Music Box	link
Pitchfork	6.1/10 link
Rolling Stone	link

The River in Reverse is a collaboration album by Elvis Costello and Allen Toussaint, released in 2006. It received a Grammy nomination for Best Pop Vocal Album.

== Track listing ==
All tracks are written by Allen Toussaint unless otherwise indicated.

No.	Title	Writer(s)	Length
1.	"On Your Way Down"		4:54
2.	"Nearer to You"		3:32
3.	"Tears, Tears and More Tears"		3:30
4.	"The Sharpest Thorn"	Elvis Costello, Toussaint	4:16
5.	"Who’s Gonna Help Brother Get Further?"		5:04
6.	"The River in Reverse"	Costello	4:32
7.	"Freedom for the Stallion"		2:58
8.	"Broken Promise Land"	Costello, Toussaint	4:34
9.	"Ascension Day"	Roy "Professor Longhair" Byrd, Costello, Toussaint	2:57
10.	"International Echo"	Costello, Toussaint	4:58
11.	"All These Things"		4:07
12.	"Wonder Woman"		3:08
13.	"Six-Fingered Man"	Costello, Toussaint	4:31
Total length:			53:01

The Japanese CD closes with "The Greatest Love" (3:47) as a bonus track. iTunes includes "Where Is the Love" (3:54), written by Costello and Toussaint.

== Personnel ==
- Elvis Costello – acoustic and electric guitars, Hammond organ, tambourine, vocals, tremolo
- Allen Toussaint – electric piano, vocals and backing vocals, horn arrangements
- Sam Williams – trombone
- Carl Blouin – baritone saxophone
- Amadee Castenell – soprano saxophone, tenor saxophone
- Brian Cayolle – baritone saxophone
- Anthony "AB" Brown – guitar
- Davey Faragher – bass guitar, backing vocals
- Steve Nieve – piano, Hammond organ, clavinet, farfisa organ
- Pete Thomas – drums, percussion
- Joe Henry – producer

== Charts ==
Chart (2006)	Peak position
Australian Albums (ARIA)	111
Belgian Albums (Ultratop Flanders)	15
Canadian Albums (Nielsen SoundScan)	78
Dutch Albums (Album Top 100)	61
Italian Albums (FIMI)	96
Norwegian Albums (VG-lista)	31
Swedish Albums (Sverigetopplistan)	40
UK Albums (Official Charts)	98
US Billboard 200	103
US Top Jazz Albums (Billboard)	2
