= Trust (Elvis Costello album) =

Studio album by Elvis Costello and the Attractions
- Released: 23 January 1981
- Recorded: October–November 1980
- Studios: DJM and Eden (London)
- Genre: Pop rock
- Length: 41:09
- Labels: F-Beat; Columbia
- Producers: Nick Lowe; Roger Béchirian

Elvis Costello and the Attractions chronology
Ten Bloody Marys & Ten How's Your Fathers (1980)	Trust (1981)	Almost Blue (1981)

Singles from Trust
- 1. "Clubland" Released: December 1980; 2. "From a Whisper to a Scream" Released: February 1981; 3. "Watch Your Step" Released: April 1981 (US)

Trust is the fifth studio album by the English singer-songwriter Elvis Costello, and his fourth with the Attractions—keyboardist Steve Nieve, bassist Bruce Thomas and drummer Pete Thomas (no relation). It was released on 23 January 1981 through F-Beat Records in the United Kingdom. Produced by Nick Lowe, with assistance by the engineer Roger Béchirian, the album was recorded in London from October to November 1980 between DJM and Eden Studios. The sessions were riddled with alcohol and drug issues and tensions were high between the band members. Squeeze's vocalist Glenn Tilbrook and the Rumour's guitarist Martin Belmont made guest appearances on "From a Whisper to a Scream".

Envisioned by Costello as crossing the melody of Armed Forces (1979) with the rhythm of Get Happy!! (1980), Trust is a pop rock album that exhibits several musical styles, including jazz, rockabilly and country. The lyrics were partly inspired by events in Costello's own life at the time, including the effects of being a touring musician and his failing marriage. The songs depict scenarios with a lack of trust and are filled with puns and double entendres. The cover artwork, in an ironic nod to the title, is a headshot of Costello appearing mistrustful.

Trust charted in the UK top ten and at number 28 in the US, while its singles performed poorly. It received positive reviews on release; critics highlighted the artist's change in tone from his earlier records, a growing maturity in the lyrics and praised Costello as a musician; it appeared on several year-end lists. The album has retrospectively received acclaim as one of Costello's best, and most underrated, works. Commentators have viewed the album as exhibiting an artist and band at their creative peaks. Costello himself was initially displeased with the album, but reversed his opinion in later years. It has been reissued multiple times with bonus tracks.

== Background and development ==
Elvis Costello released his fourth studio album Get Happy!! in February 1980. A departure from the new wave sound of 1979's Armed Forces, Get Happy!! took influences from the soul and R&B sound of the 1960s and reached number two on the UK Albums Chart, although it sold fewer copies than Armed Forces. Throughout March 1980, Costello and his backing band the Attractions—keyboardist Steve Nieve, bassist Bruce Thomas and drummer Pete Thomas (no relation)—toured at smaller cities throughout the United Kingdom, although Costello suffered several moments of instability during the shows due to alcohol and drug abuse, including forgetting lyrics, freezing in place and poor vocals. The band were back on the road throughout Europe in mid-April, although a car accident left Nieve unable to join; his absence led to poorly received shows so he was temporarily replaced by the Rumour's guitarist Martin Belmont.

In early 1980, Costello purchased a small grand piano, which would greatly influence his songwriting over the next year; it was on this instrument that he primarily wrote "Shot With His Own Gun". Throughout the year, he began stockpiling a large number of songs he would record for his next album, including "You'll Never Be a Man", "Lovers Walk", "Clubland", "New Lace Sleeves", "Watch Your Step" and "From a Whisper to a Scream". Many of these songs were debuted during live performances in July and August. In his 2015 memoir, Costello states he had begun writing "New Lace Sleeves" and "Watch Your Step" when he was 20. Other songs that dated back to the mid-1970s included "Different Finger", "Luxembourg" and a short instrumental titled "Weeper's Dream". Around this time he also struck a working relationship with fellow new wave band Squeeze and would collaborate with its members over the next several years; Costello's manager Jake Riviera also began co-managing both artists.

== Recording ==
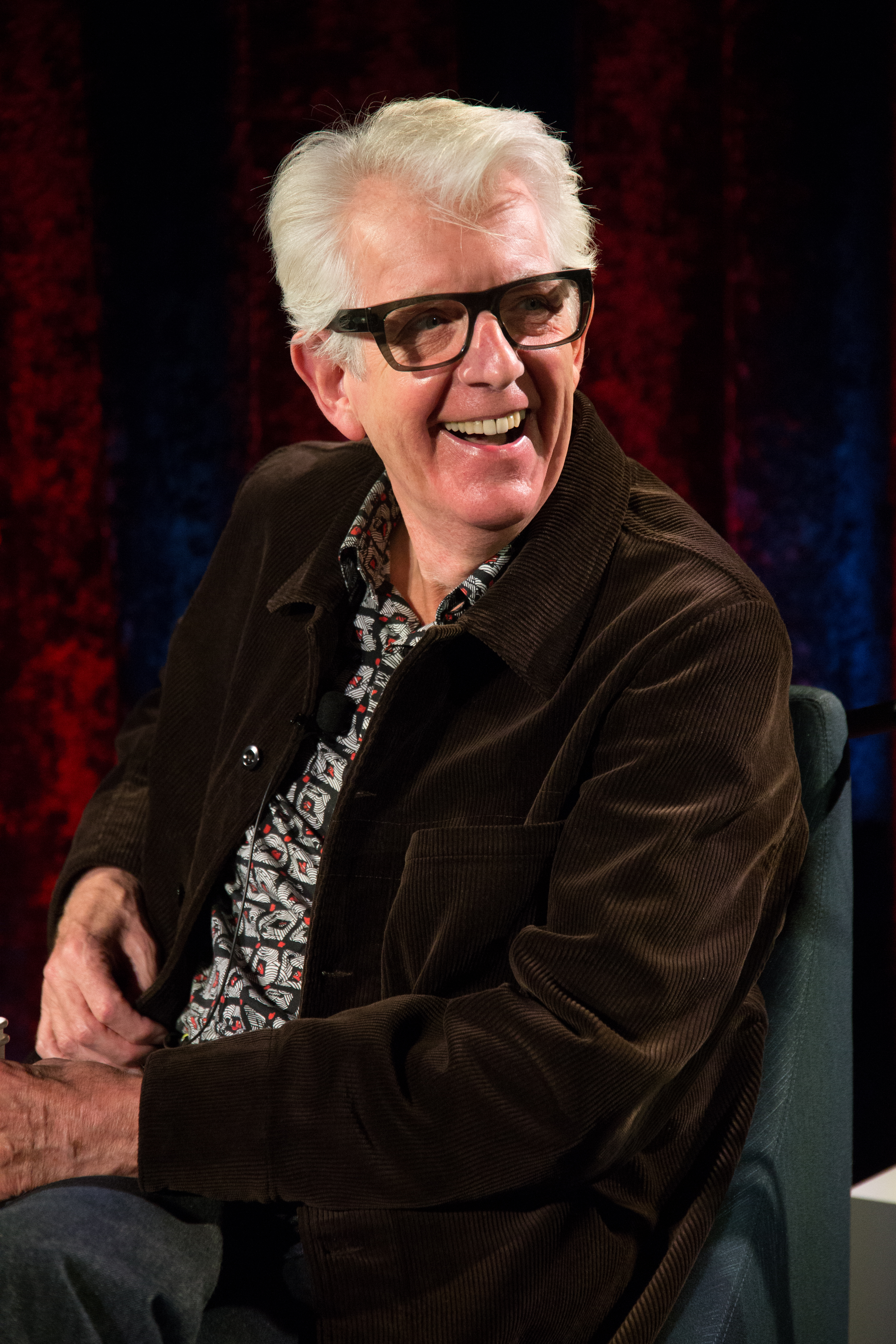
Trust was the last of five consecutive Costello albums produced by musician Nick Lowe (pictured in 2017).

Costello and the Attractions demoed material at London's Eden Studios throughout September 1980 before commencing work in October at DJM Studios in Holborn, central London, with the team of Nick Lowe and Roger Béchirian returning from prior albums. These sessions were riddled with issues, with Costello stating that they were "often frantic, swinging from elation to despair for which I must take most of the blame." Unlike previous albums, Lowe and Béchirian worked back and forth as producers, each taking charge of separate sessions. Their work ethics were different, which slowed progress. Similar to the sessions for Get Happy!!, the band was consistently intoxicated. Béchirian recalled: "By that point, I think everybody was just fed up with seeing each other. There was a real sense of animosity, a cloud over the project. It was just a real struggle, because nobody seemed to care about it." The atmosphere at DJM was similarly problematic, as the studio was constructed for the "tight, dry and muted" sound of the early 1970s and was ill-suited to the expansive sound Costello wanted, although the group "took advantage" of the dry sound for "New Lace Sleeves" and "Watch Your Step". According to Costello, the "working method" at DJM entailed being disenchanted upon playback of the previous day's efforts, followed by getting intoxicated at the local pub, before coming back to record, after which the cycle would continue, although this method produced "coherent" performances in "Shot With His Own Gun". In the liner notes for the 2003 reissue, Costello stated:

This was easily the most drug-influenced record of my career ... It was completed close to a self-induced nervous collapse on a diet of rough 'scrumpy' cider, gin and tonic, various powders ... and, in the final hours, Seconal and Johnnie Walker Black Label. The barely coherent ramblings of my addled brain were gradually beaten into some shape by the relentless re-working of melodies and lyrical fragments, many of which predated my professional career.

Like Get Happy!!, the band decided a different location would be better-suited and moved recording back to Eden, where they were more productive. Nieve exerted more control on the arrangements, so his piano and organ dominate the songs, particularly on "Shot With His Own Gun", "You'll Never Be a Man" and "Black Sails in the Sunset", as well as "New Lace Sleeves" and "Watch Your Step". Costello also experimented with a soft croon, having done so on Get Happy!!'s "Secondary Modern", but by this time, had developed into, in the biographer Graeme Thomson's words, "a silky, lascivious moan, at once amused and disgusted." At one point, Costello's voice was shot so Squeeze vocalist Glenn Tilbrook offered to sing a guide vocal on "From a Whisper to a Scream". (Note: Costello had already agreed to produce Squeeze's East Side Story after he recorded Trust, so Tilbrook wanted to return the favour.) Costello liked the performance so much he made it a duet. Belmont was also invited and added guitar to the same track. The band recorded for several days without Lowe while he was struck with flu; Costello felt the final version of "Clubland" lacked in his absence. During the final days, Costello also recorded a solo track, a re-working of "Big Sister" titled "Big Sister's Clothes", which featured melodica, skin tambourine, vibraphone, timpani, as well as "backwards accordion". Production for the track was credited to Costello alone. The sleeve credits the production to Lowe "in association with" Béchirian "assisted by" Neill King.

The new album was finished by early November 1980. According to Béchirian, the atmosphere remained fraught throughout: "I remember when we were mixing there were fights. Bruce Thomas walking out of the control room, leaving the band and Jake chasing after him. The whole thing was mental." Costello later concurred that despite these tensions, he felt the final album contained some of the Attractions' best performances, naming "Strict Time", "Lovers Walk", "White Knuckles", and "New Lace Sleeves". Trust was chosen as the title over working titles Looking Italian and Cats and Dogs.

== Music and lyrics ==
The songs on this record are loosely concerned with a kind of disenchantment that seemed to settle on me in my mid-20s. Certainly, the recent political swing to the Right offered a gloomier sense of the future and provided the lyrics of "Clubland", "Pretty Words", and the unsubtle commentary on the new prime Minister's enthusiasm for Cold War posturing: "Big Sister". The sense of general dread and paranoia of "Strict Time" was probably not unconnected with the influence of controlled substances, but this was also to be found in the words of "New Lace Sleeves" and "Watch Your Step".

— Elvis Costello, 2003 Trust liner notes

Costello's original intent for Trust was to cross the melody of Armed Forces with the rhythm of Get Happy!!. The author Mick St. Michael states that he took the best elements of previous albums for Trust: the "lyrical zest" of My Aim Is True (1977), the "energy" of This Year's Model (1978) and the "commerciality" of Armed Forces. As such, Trust displays a wide variety of musical styles. An overall pop rock album, genres exhibited on Trust range from jazz ("Clubland"), soul pop ("Watch Your Step"), rockabilly ("Luxembourg"), Tin Pan Alley-style pop ("Shot with His Own Gun") and country ("Different Finger"). AllMusic's Stephen Thomas Erlewine also notes the "more complex arrangements and musicianship" that accompany "White Knuckles" and "New Lace Sleeves".

Despite having previously expressed a desire to distance himself from the pop music mainstream, Costello revealed that a number of songs on the album were influenced by other contemporary artists. "Clubland" incorporated the guitar style of the Police, "You'll Never Be a Man" borrowed from the Pretenders, "White Knuckles" was modelled on XTC records, and "Fish 'n' Chip Paper" was an homage to Squeeze. "Lovers Walk" featured a Bo Diddley-type beat while "Big Sister's Clothes" had a bass line based on work by the Clash. Additionally, Costello's newfound appreciation for songwriters such as Cole Porter, Rodgers and Hart and Sammy Caine, singers such as Frank Sinatra, and his own father Ross McManus – a singer and trumpeter – would influence the writing of Trust.

Costello describes the album's lyrics as depicting a world with a lack of trust. Partly taking influences from events in his own life at the time, including the effects of being a touring musician, the songs delve into politics ("Clubland", "Big Sister's Clothes", "Pretty Words"), ennui ("Watch Your Step", "Strict Time") and the slow disintegration of personal relationships ("Lovers Walk", "Different Finger", "You'll Never Be a Man"). Costello later recalled that his failing marriage was reflected in "Different Finger", "Lovers Walk", "Shot With His Own Gun", the brutal portrait of "White Knuckles" and its companion song, "You'll Never Be a Man", while "Clubland", "Pretty Words" and "White Knuckles" were influenced by the violence encountered on the Get Happy!! tour. "Watch Your Step" and "Fish 'n' Chip Paper" both reference boxing fans, while the latter features a great distaste for the media. The biographer Brian Hinton later commented that the album concerned "sour and rotten doings in different areas". Using his signature wordplay, Costello filled the songs with puns and double entendres. The narrators range from being observers and participants, to inflictors and the inflicted parties. The author James E. Perone summarises the album as an exploration in the betrayal of trust, either on or by the narrators.

=== Side one ===
The album's first two songs, "Clubland" and "Lovers Walk", lack first-person narrators and instead observe different individuals. In "Clubland", Costello targets the people who frequent nightclubs, such as gangsters and drug addicts. The biographer David Gouldstone interprets the nightclubs as a metaphor for Britain in the 1980s and compares the setting to This Year's Model, particularly "Pump It Up". With a jazz-inspired piano line and James Bond–style electric guitar, Perone draws comparisons to Costello's earlier single "Watching the Detectives" (1977). AllMusic's Stewart Mason stated that its "richly detailed" arrangement presaged the "ornate constructions" of Imperial Bedroom (1982) and Costello's other explorations into Baroque art pop. In "Lovers Walk", Costello expresses his suspicions of love as a concept and the narrator's hesitation about falling in love, with Perone singling out the lyric "making promises that they can't keep" as a perfect summary. Like Costello's "Girls Talk", the title is used as a statement rather than a phrase, warnings listeners to "be on caution where lovers walk". Perone argues that this lyric establishes a sub-theme that purveys throughout the album, wherein Trust is not only about the concept of broken trust, but it is also a direct warning to not make the same mistakes as the characters in the tracks.

First-person narrators are introduced in "You'll Never Be a Man", which describes an encounter between a man and a visibly shaken woman. The man craves for honesty and tenderness but is unable to act on the matter, leading Costello to proclaim the title line. Gouldstone likens it to the tracks on Get Happy!! that involve domestic violence, particularly "Human Touch". A new wave track with a prominent drum mix, Mason deduced the track as sounding like "Costello's take on mainstream late-'70s/early-'80s AOR." He also stated that the vocal melody would later be imitated by artists such as Van Morrison and 10cc on their more radio-friendly tracks. The narrator of "Pretty Words" struggles to communicate with his partner, which is put into a social context and used as an attack on tabloid media. With the realisation that "pretty words don't mean much anymore", the songs acts as a metaphor for society's lack of common decency; the use of "pretty words" to ease evil acts such as genocide does nothing to diminish the evil of the act itself. Musically, the song is reminiscent of 1960s pop-rock.

"Strict Time" combines a Latin-inspired piano line with the description of a world filled with hysteria and totalitarianism. Like "The Beat" from This Year's Model, the title is a musical metaphor, implying that everyone acts in a set-in-stone way despite appearing as though they are acting under free will. "Luxembourg" is a 1950s-era rockabilly track akin to "Mystery Dance" from My Aim Is True that uses tourism as an assault on modern life. Perone describes it as "a put-down of mainland European (or Asian) tourists that take advantage of and put down the British". As a result, these tourists are subjected to a holiday in Luxembourg, "a destination that [is] less desirable than London". In a change of tempo and mood from previous track, wherein the former increases throughout, Perone considers "Watch Your Step" a showcase for the "sophisticated interplay" of Costello and the Attractions. Gouldstone comments that "its broodingly soulful intensity is like a requiem for all vain wishes". The more upbeat music stands in contrast with the more disheartening lyrics, which takes place in a club and is filled with a variety of images, including surveillance. The lyrics get progressively darker and by the end, describes a scenario where a group of young male customers conduct brutal acts that end with violent consequences such as death, which Gouldstone argues proves that their actions are insignificant.

=== Side two ===
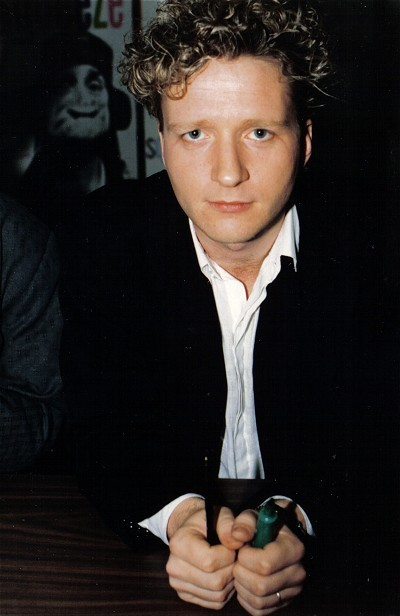
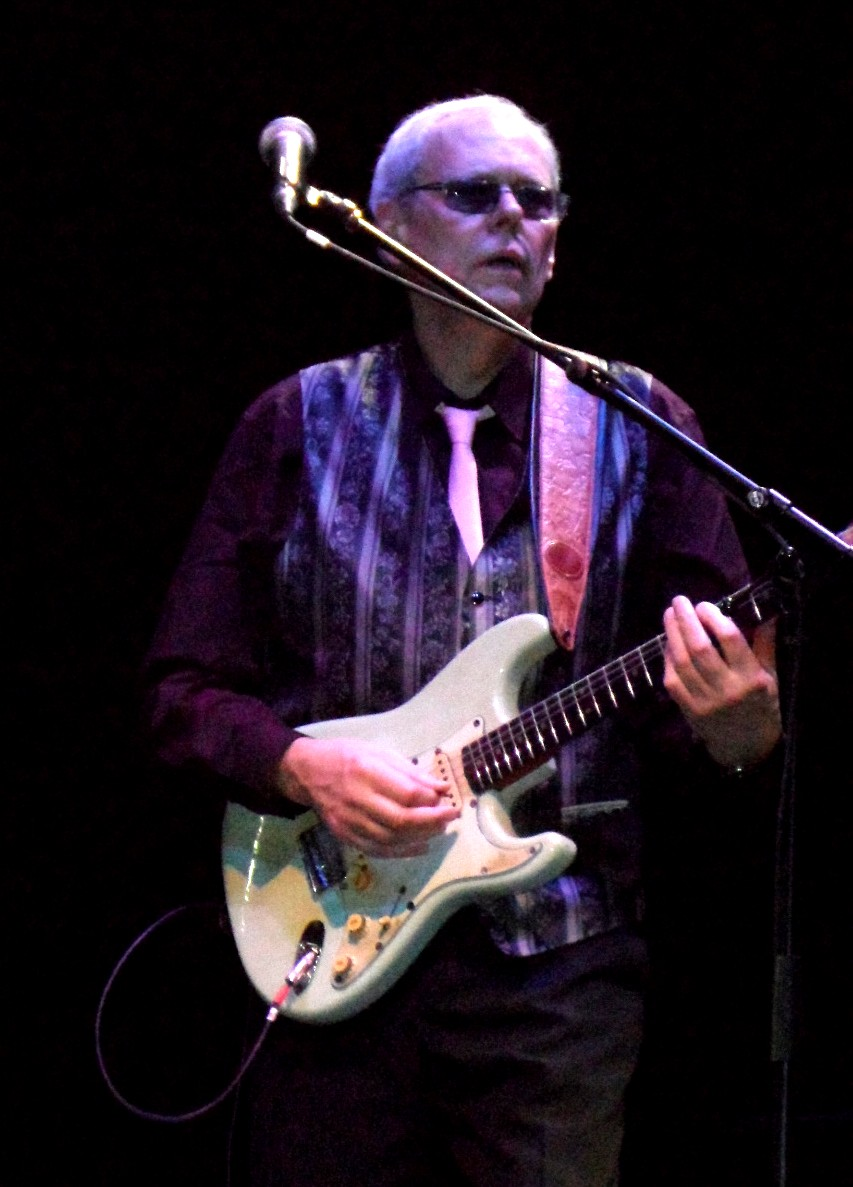
Squeeze vocalist Glenn Tilbrook (left, in 1987) and the Rumour guitarist Martin Belmont (right, in 2012) made guest appearances on "From a Whisper to a Scream".

In the 2003 liner notes, Costello stated that "New Lace Sleeves" is "mostly concerned with the tension between passion and the emotionally suppressing influence of 'being civilized'." Perone notes that the song contains a lower concentration of puns that allows the lyrics to be more easily analysable by the listener and less "glossed over". Like "Pretty Words", it sets a personal relationship in a social context. Initially chronicling the morning after a late-night hook-up, the song later juxtaposes a young woman's bad choices with society's expectations of her. Perone writes that it acts as a critique of personal inconsistency, contrasting "the clean, pretty look of a young woman's new outfit with the sometimes tawdry and messy reality of sexual desire and fulfillment". Perone ties the band's performance to the mid-1960s rather than the 1980s, stating it presents a mix of pop, jazz and lounge music. Similar to "Clubland" and "Watch Your Step", "From a Whisper to a Scream" takes place in a club and is an exploration of alcohol abuse by the intoxicated first-person narrator and the problems that come with it, with the "scream" representing violence or sexual frustration. Perone opines that the vocal harmonies of Costello and Tilbrook do not blend as well as the former's later duets, while Hinton compares the pairing to a "white Sam & Dave".

"Different Finger" is a pastiche country song that addresses marital infidelity. Using observation rather than a narrator, wherein guilt is the dominant emotion, Gouldstone states that it is Costello's first song to be about "a specifically adulterous affair". A first-person narrator acts as an observer on the darker "White Knuckles", which concerns the beating and sexual exploitation of a woman by a man. The lyrics are overall sympathetic to the abuser, painting him as a victim and giving reason as to why the abuser turned to violence. The woman is receptive to the violence as she fails to see a life without it; she is reinforced to remain in the abusive relationship by her loved ones, who essentially tell her "I told you so". Like Get Happy!!'s "Beaten to the Punch", "White Knuckles" is a denouncement of a man who invokes violence on his partner. Perone writes that the song suggests an influence of the Stranglers both musically and lyrically.

According to Costello, "Shot With His Own Gun" is a type of "torch song" that acts as atonement for his wrongdoings of the previous three years. Solely featuring voice over piano, the impressionist lyrics touch on a particularly stale relationship and presents a more sympathetic view to the woman rather than the man, who is, metaphorically, "shot with his own gun". Gouldstone calls both it and "White Knuckles" milestones for Costello as up to this point, the women in his songs were shown a lack of sympathy. "Fish 'n' Chip Paper" is lighter in tone compared to the previous two tracks, offering a critique of the media. Regarding the track, Costello stated: "I don't think I was attacking the press in relation to my career, just generally." Perone highlights the line "yesterday's news is tomorrow's fish 'n' chip paper" as "suggesting the transitory nature and lack of real importance of public gossip". The music itself features a heavier studio production with several overdubs; Costello's voice is treated with electronic processing. "Big Sister's Clothes" was produced and solely performed by Costello and contains experimentation that Perone compares to the Beach Boys' Pet Sounds (1966). According to Gouldstone, the song concerns how deceitful love can be for people growing up and how young girls who are eager to grow up by wearing their "big sister's clothes" fail to see the consequences of wanting to grow up so quickly. Perone opines that it could also offer commentary on the state of Britain during the era of Thatcherism.

== Packaging and artwork ==
While the sleeve packaging for Get Happy!! mimicked the 1960s, Gouldstone argues that the packaging for Trust imitated the 1940s and 1950s. The cover artwork is an out-of-focus headshot of Costello wearing a suit and red-tinted glasses. His eyebrows are arched, his glasses are tilted and he is looking up. The cover itself lacks the artist's name and the title is underlined. Costello later said that the cover was a form of irony, as "the person on the cover looks completely untrustworthy". Perone considers it "one of the most memorable images" in early 1980s pop music. The original intended artwork depicted Costello in a film noir scene dressed like Guy Fawkes in a dark coat, glasses and fedora, lighting a cigarette. The back cover is, in Hinton's words, "deliberately skew-wiff", depicting the band playing at what appears to be a cocktail bar, although it was actually shot on a stage set. The inside of the sleeve boasts an image of the Attractions and other individuals dressed as a brass big band, with the caption "The Soundtrack of Life". Alongside Lowe dressed in a tuxedo mime-playing a saxophone, the photograph included the band's road crew, F-Beat staff and the owners of Eden Studios. The original packaging did not include a lyric sheet.

== Release ==
F-Beat issued "Clubland" as the lead single from the album, backed by the outtakes "Clean Money" and "Hoover Factory", in December 1980 for the pre-Christmas market. It charted at number 60 in the UK, breaking a string of nine consecutive top 40 singles for the artist. Thomson commented that it "effectively marked the end of Elvis and the Attractions' flirtation with pop stardom". On 4 January 1981, Costello and the Attractions commenced a six-week tour of North America – his first there in almost two years – with Squeeze as the supporting act. Compared to previous tours, the shows were longer than before, with 20 to 30 songs played every show, ranging from songs across his career and several covers. Costello's behaviour on stage was also enthusiastic and earned him positive reviews from attendees, although alcohol and drugs frequented throughout the tour.

F-Beat issued Trust in the UK on 23 January 1981, while its US release through Columbia came on 29 January. It peaked at number nine on the UK Albums Chart but stalled at number 28 on the US Billboard Top LPs & Tape chart. Elsewhere, Trust charted at number eight in Sweden, 17 in New Zealand, 28 in Norway and 71 in Australia. The biographer Tony Clayton-Lea commented that "Trust's creative strength – variety – was its commercial weakness". In February, "From a Whisper to a Scream" was issued as the second single, backed by "Luxembourg", which failed to chart, becoming the artist's first flop since "(The Angels Wanna Wear My) Red Shoes" in 1977. To increase publicity, Riviera arranged for the band to appear on Jimmy Savile's programme Jim'll Fix It, where a young boy earned the opportunity to become a roadie for a day. The band also filmed promotional music videos for "Clubland" and "New Lace Sleeves".

Costello and the Attractions embarked a small tour of Britain in March 1981, titled A Tour to Trust, with Dave and the Mistakes as the supporting act. In April, Costello underwent an interview with Tom Snyder on NBC's Tomorrow, marking his first appearance on live television in the US since Saturday Night Live in late 1977. "Watch Your Step" was rush-released as a single in the country to coincide with the event.

== Critical reception ==
Professional ratings
Initial reviews
Review scores
Source	Rating
Record Mirror	5/5 stars
Rolling Stone	4/5 stars
Smash Hits	9/10
Sounds	3.5/5 stars
The Spokesman-Review	4/4 stars
The Village Voice	A

Trust initially received mixed-to-positive reviews from music critics in the UK. Reviewers highlighted the artist's change in tone from his earlier records and a growing maturity in the lyrics. Melody Maker's Allan Jones summarised: "Costello's vision is as fierce as ever, but the malice has gone; he can still rage but he no longer scolds." Some found the album a poor retread from his earlier works, while others thought the lyrics were too inaccessible for casual listeners. More positively, Mike Gardner in Record Mirror believed the "energy and care" brought by Costello and the Attractions allowed the "Costello formula" to continue to succeed.

In contrast, Trust received massive acclaim in the US. American critics emphasised the diverse and accessible musical styles, a growing maturity in the lyrics and continued to praise Costello as one of the best musicians in modern music. (Note: Attributed to multiple references:) Some believed it was Costello's best work up to that point. In The New York Times, Robert Palmer stressed the importance of the Attractions as a backing band, writing that they have not only expanded their ranges, but sound "fuller and richer" than on Get Happy!! Palmer further saluted the artist for creating a body of work that remained consistently high quality. A reviewer for Cash Box deemed it a return to form over Get Happy!!, concluding: "New wave or old, Costello remains at music's forefront." Ken Tucker found Trust contained some of the artist's "very best" and "very worst" work in Rolling Stone, stating that its "smooth sound and clever accompaniments don't yield a forthright LP". In The Village Voice, Robert Christgau drew positive comparisons to This Year's Model, arguing that "this is rock and roll as eloquent, hard-hitting pop, and Elvis has turned into such a soul man that I no longer wish he'd change his name to George and go country."

Trust was ranked the seventh best album of 1981 by NME and topped the year-end list by Trouser Press. In The Village Voice's annual Pazz & Jop critics' poll of the year's best albums, Trust finished third, behind X's Wild Gift and the Clash's Sandinista!

== Subsequent events and legacy ==
It was the low point physically. It was the most dissolute record that I personally made, so I wasn't in great humour at the end of it. I did a lot of things which made my first marriage untenable, and therefore it was a very fraught time for everybody. When I got over my association with the bad time, the record itself was surprisingly coherent.

— Elvis Costello

After its release, Costello was initially displeased with the record. In an interview with The Face in 1983, he stated: "I feel it's under-realised. There were some very good songs on it and some very bad songs, but overall we didn't follow it through to anything definite enough." By 2002, Costello described Trust as "a record that falls between the cracks a little bit", but stated that he felt "New Lace Sleeves" stood as one of the Attractions' greatest performances. Trust was Costello's final album with the team of Lowe and Béchirian.

According to Thomson, the weaker commercial performances of both Get Happy!! and Trust made Costello question where he was at in his career. He was unable to express his current thoughts into his own music and proclaimed that he "just wanted to sing other people's songs". Having recorded acoustic demos of several standards during the previous months, including "Gloomy Sunday" and Cole Porter's "Love for Sale", Costello devised an album of cover versions to test himself as a singer and interpreter. Released in October 1981, Almost Blue was composed entirely of country covers and was derided by the music press, particularly in the United States. Costello teamed up with former Beatles engineer Geoff Emerick for Imperial Bedroom, his most heavily produced, heavily orchestrated and most expansive work up to that point;

=== Retrospective appraisal ===
Professional ratings
Retrospective reviews
Review scores
Source	Rating
AllMusic	5/5 stars
Blender	5/5 stars
Chicago Tribune	3/4 stars
Encyclopedia of Popular Music	4/5 stars
Entertainment Weekly	A
Mojo	4/5 stars
The Rolling Stone Album Guide	5/5 stars
Select	4/5
Uncut	5/5 stars

Retrospectively, Trust has received critical acclaim as one of Costello's best, and most underrated, works that warrants reappraisal. (Note: Attributed to multiple references:) Commentators have viewed Trust as exhibiting an artist and band at their creative peaks. (Note: Attributed to multiple references:) Reviewing for Uncut in 2003, Jon Wilde found the album contained "a binge of great songwriting", summarising: "Showcasing some of [Costello's] most violently acerbic writing, with the Attractions at their most pathologically inventive, Trust boomed and slammed and whispered with sly, creative intent." Thomson argues that at its best, Trust showcased Costello "at his most darkly dramatic" and the Attractions "at their most restrained yet widescreen".

Some also wrote that the album contains both "complexity" and "sophistication" that the artist's earlier LPs lacked. Writing in 2006, Treblezine's Ernest Simpson noted that Trust lacked the "standout successes" of the artist's prior albums, yet all of the LP's songs contained a "sophistication" that those works lacked, including the absence of an opening track that began with Costello's voice before the band joined in. He ultimately deemed it "probably the most diverse and yet consistently great album that Elvis & the Attractions ever released". AllMusic editor Stephen Thomas Erlewine agreed, arguing that it is Costello and the Attractions' "most impressive album". In a piece commemorating the 30th anniversary of its release, Sheffield named Trust Costello's best album, one that remains "his funniest, his wisest and his most rocking". Writers for Stereogum called the album "yet another high watermark" for Costello in 2021. In a more mixed review, Rob Smith of Ultimate Classic Rock acknowledged the record contained both highs and lows and concluded that it falls between being a classic and a dud.

In 2000, Trust was voted number 708 in the third edition of writer Colin Larkin's book All Time Top 1000 Albums. Twenty years later, Paste magazine ranked it the 25th best album of the 1980s.

=== Reissues ===
Trust was first released on CD through Columbia and Demon Records in January 1986. Its first extended reissue through Demon in the UK and Rykodisc in the US on CD came in May 1994, which came with nine bonus tracks. Rhino Records reissued the album on 9 September 2003 as a two-disc set with eight additional bonus tracks alongside those of 1994. The album later was remastered and reissued by UMe on 4 December 2015.

== Track listing ==
All songs are written by Elvis Costello.

Side one

1. "Clubland" – 3:42
2. "Lovers Walk" – 2:17
3. "You'll Never Be a Man" – 2:56
4. "Pretty Words" – 3:11
5. "Strict Time" – 2:40
6. "Luxembourg" – 2:26
7. "Watch Your Step" – 2:57

Side two

1. "New Lace Sleeves" – 3:45
2. "From a Whisper to a Scream" – 2:54
3. "Different Finger" – 1:58
4. "White Knuckles" – 3:47
5. "Shot With His Own Gun" – 3:30
6. "Fish 'n' Chip Paper" – 2:55
7. "Big Sister's Clothes" – 2:11

== Personnel ==
According to the 1994 reissue liner notes:

- Elvis Costello – vocals, guitars, all instruments on "Big Sister's Clothes"
- Steve Nieve – piano, organ
- Bruce Thomas – bass
- Pete Thomas – drums

Additional personnel

- Glenn Tilbrook – vocal on "From a Whisper to a Scream"
- Martin Belmont – guitar on "From a Whisper to a Scream"

Technical

- Nick Lowe – producer
- Roger Béchirian – engineer, production assistance
- Neill King – production assistance
- Greg Allen – art direction, design
- Keith Morris, Paul Cox – photography

== Charts ==
Weekly chart performance for Trust
Chart (1981)	Peak Position
Australian Albums (Kent Music Report)	71
New Zealand Albums (RIANZ)	17
Norwegian Albums (VG-lista)	28
Swedish Albums (Sverigetopplistan)	8
UK Albums Chart	9
US Billboard Top LPs & Tape	28
