= Watch Your Step (Elvis Costello song) =

1981 song by Elvis Costello

Single by Elvis Costello and the Attractions

from the album Trust
- B-side: "Luxembourg"
- Released: April 1981
- Recorded: October–November 1980
- Genre: New wave
- Label: Columbia (US)
- Songwriter: Elvis Costello
- Producers: Nick Lowe; Roger Béchirian

Elvis Costello and the Attractions singles chronology
"From a Whisper to a Scream" (1981)	"Watch Your Step" (1981)	"A Good Year for the Roses" (1981)

"Watch Your Step" is a song written by new wave musician Elvis Costello and performed by Costello and the Attractions on their 1981 album, Trust. Originating from lyrics he wrote as a 20-year-old, "Watch Your Step" was inspired by Costello's experiences on tour as well as by dub music. The song was originally a louder rock song, but the final released version is slower and quieter.

The song was released in the USA as the sole single from Trust in 1981. It failed to chart there and was not released as a single in the UK. Despite this, the song has seen positive critical reception and has been a live favourite.

== Background ==
According to Costello, "Watch Your Step" originated from lyrics that he wrote in the mid-70s, when he was 20 years old. Costello had copied these lyrics from notebook to notebook for over five years until he "found their rightful home". The lyric "Listen to the hammers falling in the breaker's yard" references a memory Costello had of watching the scrapping of steam locomotives on the news when he was a child.

Other lyrics derived from his experiences on tour; references to "carnival desires" were, according to Costello, "just a picturesque way of saying that you might have to choose between chasing the wrong girl and avoiding gangs of lads shouting abuse and spewing into the gutters". The lyric "Backslapping drinkers cheer the heavyweight brawl" comes from, as Costello explained, "the kind of dubious lodgings [on tour] where the police drank after hours with local ne'er-do-wells and the bar didn't close until dawn".

Costello finished writing "Watch Your Step" in the summer of 1980, before the recording of the Trust album. A demo of the song was created during this same time; at the time, the song was, according to Costello biographer Graeme Thomson, a "raucous rocker", contrasting with the final version that Costello described as "a slow dance number". The song's use of melodica was, according to Costello, inspired by dub music; a planned guitar solo for the song was scrapped in its place.

== Release and reception ==
"Watch Your Step" was released as the only single from Trust in America; in the UK, "Clubland" and "From a Whisper to a Scream" were released instead. The B-side was "Luxembourg", though a 12-inch single instead featured Costello's interview with Tom Snyder on the B-side. The single failed to chart in the US. The song has since appeared on compilation albums The Best of Elvis Costello and the Attractions, Girls Girls Girls, and The Very Best of Elvis Costello and The Attractions 1977–86.

"Watch Your Step" has seen critical acclaim and has been named by many writers as a highlight of Trust. A contemporary review from Cashbox highlighted the song's "subdued carnival feel" and Steve Naive’s calliope-like keyboards". Rick Anderson of AllMusic described the track as "a song that is unsettling and slightly scary, but still great for singing along to" and wrote that the song "proved a couple of things: first, that [Costello] really did know how to write for his own voice, and second, that his voice really wasn't all that bad". Rob Sheffield of Rolling Stone noted the song as well as "New Lace Sleeves" as "the album's undisputed twin highlights". Noel Murray and Keith Phipps of The A.V. Club named the song as a highlight from Trust and called it "beguilingly paranoid". Jim Miller of Newsweek wrote, "On 'Watch Your Step' he builds a complex mood out of the title's admonition, turning the song into a bittersweet tribute to suspicion".

Dave Lifton of Ultimate Classic Rock named the song as the fourth best Elvis Costello song, stating, "The ominous 'Watch Your Step,' with a subdued performance by the Attractions and Costello's voice barely rising above a whisper, is the best [on Trust]". The Daily Telegraph's Martin Chilton ranked the song number 31 on his top 40 list of best Costello songs.

== Live history ==
"Watch Your Step" has been performed live by Costello regularly since its release. Costello debuted the song in his live setlist during the Get Happy tour. Costello also performed the song on The Tomorrow Show with Tom Snyder in 1981 to promote Trust. He cited the appearance as "return[ing] us from our exile from US television" after his 1979 controversy. David Hyland of WPR noted that the song was one of the tracks Costello performed at a 2015 show in Madison that "offered many opportunities for Nieve to impress", noting that Nieve's performance on "Watch Your Step" "featured several exquisite runs".
