= From a Whisper to a Scream (song) =

1981 song by Elvis Costello

Single by Elvis Costello and the Attractions

from the album Trust
- B-side: "Luxembourg"
- Released: 27 February 1981
- Recorded: October–November 1980
- Genre: New wave, power pop
- Label: F-Beat (UK)
- Songwriter: Elvis Costello
- Producers: Nick Lowe; Roger Béchirian

Elvis Costello and the Attractions singles chronology
"Clubland" (1980)	"From a Whisper to a Scream" (1981)	"Watch Your Step" (1981)

"From a Whisper to a Scream" is a song written by new wave musician Elvis Costello and performed by Costello and the Attractions on their 1981 album, Trust. With lyrics referencing drinking, the song notably features a guest vocal from Squeeze frontman and songwriter Glenn Tilbrook as well as a guitar part from ex-Rumour guitarist Martin Belmont.

The song was released in the UK as the second single from Trust in February 1981. It under-performed as a single compared to the band's previous releases, failing to chart in Britain despite achieving some success on the rock charts in the US. Despite this, the song has seen positive critical reception.

== Background ==
Costello first demoed "From a Whisper to a Scream" at producer Nick Lowe's Am-Pro Studio in Shepherd's Bush. The song was one of the first written for Trust, alongside tracks such as "New Lace Sleeves" and "Watch Your Step". Like many of Costello's songs during this period, "From a Whisper to a Scream" makes references to drinking, punning on the English expression "one over the eight"—a phrase that means being excessively intoxicated—with the lyric "But the one over the eight seems less like one or more like four".

"From a Whisper to a Scream" features Squeeze singer and guitarist Glenn Tilbrook, who shares the lead vocals on the track with Costello. Costello had met Tilbrook and his Squeeze songwriting partner Chris Difford at a bar and they would "forge a lifelong friendship". (Note: Costello would later ask Difford to contribute lyrics to his song "Boy with a Problem", which appeared on Costello's 1982 album Imperial Bedroom.) The two acts would grow closer when Squeeze supported Costello and the Attractions on tour in 1980 and Costello agreed to produce Squeeze's 1981 album East Side Story. Tilbrook later described Costello as "brilliant" and "very nice".

Because Costello had lost his voice during the recording of the song, Tilbrook offered to provide a guide vocal for the song to help the Attractions record a backing track. Costello recalled, "The effect was so impressive that we decided to cut the song as a duet when I had recovered". The song also features former Rumour guitarist Martin Belmont, who was, at the time, a member of Lowe's touring band.

== Release and reception ==
"From a Whisper to a Scream" was released as the second single from Trust, following the commercially disappointing "Clubland". The B-side was "Luxembourg", another track from the album. The single was a commercial failure in the UK, becoming Costello's first single not to chart in the country since "(The Angels Wanna Wear My) Red Shoes". Despite not being released as a single in the US, the song saw notable radio airplay in America and reached number 46 on the Mainstream rock charts. This would be the first time a Costello song charted in the top 100 of any American chart.

Stephen Thomas Erlewine wrote that "'From a Whisper to a Scream' rocks as hard as anything since This Year's Model," while Ken Tucker of Rolling Stone wrote, "In 'From a Whisper to a Scream,' Costello's sour croon and Tilbrook's sweet moan swoop and dive around each other in joyous comradeship". Ed Masley of The Arizona Republic described the song as a "classic rocker", while Treble's Ernest Simpson lauded the song as one of Costello's best collaborations. John Borack of Goldmine ranked it one of ten must-hear Costello songs, praising it as a "maddeningly catchy little power pop number" and noting that "the honey-voiced Tilbrook provides the perfect vocal counterpoint".

Costello's opinion of the song was mixed—in a 1982 interview, he stated that he felt the song "rang hollow", although "I had enjoyed it and Glenn sang great".

== Live history ==
"From a Whisper to a Scream" has since been performed live multiple times. Costello, Tilbrook, and the Attractions played the song live in 1981 on the Jimmy Savile program Jim'll Fix It. In the episode, a child's wish to be a roadie is fulfilled and, following the performance, Costello gives the boy a tour pass and a Costello-branded road crew jacket.

Since then, Costello and Tilbrook have performed the song separately. During performances in 2019, Costello would share vocals with backing vocalists Briana Lee and Kitten Kuroi. Tilbrook has performed the song at solo concerts, sometimes inviting an audience member to sing Costello's part. In 2012, Tilbrook made a guest appearance at a Costello concert in Brighton, where the two performed "From a Whisper to a Scream" and "Pump It Up".

== Charts ==
Chart (1981)	Peak position
US (Billboard Mainstream Rock Chart)	46
