= Clubland (song) =

Single by Elvis Costello and the Attractions

from the album Trust
- B-side: "Clean Money"; "Hoover Factory"
- Released: 12 December 1980
- Recorded: October–November 1980
- Genre: New wave
- Length: 3:42
- Label: F-Beat (UK)
- Songwriter: Elvis Costello
- Producers: Nick Lowe; Roger Béchirian

Elvis Costello and the Attractions singles chronology
"New Amsterdam" (1980)	"Clubland" (1980)	"From a Whisper to a Scream" (1981)

"Clubland" is a song written by new wave musician Elvis Costello and performed by Costello and the Attractions on their 1981 album, Trust. Written in 1980, the song was performed live in festivals before the album's release. The lyrics, inspired by the band's most recent tour, describe life in nightclubs, while the music includes inspiration from The Police.

The song was released as the first single from Trust in December 1980, backed by two unreleased songs from the Armed Forces sessions. It under-performed as a single compared to the band's previous releases, reaching number 60, but has been praised by critics.

== Background ==
"Clubland" had been written in the summer of 1980, before the recording of the Trust album. A demo of the song was created during this same time. Early versions of the song and other songs from Trust, including "From a Whisper to a Scream", "You'll Never Be a Man", and "Lover's Walk", were debuted at the band's festival appearances in 1980, such as the band's performance at the Montreux Jazz Festival.

In his memoir, Unfaithful Music & Disappearing Ink, Costello writes that the lyrical inspiration for the song, as well as other songs on Trust such as "Pretty Words" and "White Knuckles", comes from the Get Happy!! tour. The song's lyrics detail the nightlife and club scene, containing multiple double entendres and puns. Musically, Costello claims that his guitar work on the song was inspired by new wave band The Police. Costello later described "Clubland" as "'Message in a Bottle' with a middle eight". He recalled,

Oddest of all, it now occurs to me the circular arpeggios in "Clubland" may have secretly been a disrespectful gloss of the Police's guitar style, though obviously with a darker lyrical content that their songs always seemed to lack.

The song also contains "quasi-latin" piano work by Steve Nieve and drumming by Pete Thomas that is, according to Jim Beviglia of American Songwriter, "all over the place propelling the song in different directions without ever getting in the way of the tune". Costello claimed in the liner notes for Trust that the studio version of the song was lacking in comparison to later renditions.

== Recording ==
During the album's recording, Costello and the Attractions had "approached this song as if it were to be the next in our only recently broken run of hit singles". Producer Nick Lowe had fallen ill with the flu and was absent during much of the song's recording, Costello explained,

We continued to record for several days without Nick Lowe while he was down with the flu. And the record of "Clubland" probably never did recover from his absence. Although the arrangement was strong, I now see why Nick had some reservations about our master take upon his return to the studio. At the time I was adamant that this was the version to be mixed, although I have heard the same arrangement played to very much better effect on many occasions since.

== Release ==
"Clubland" was released as a single in Britain in December 1980, prior to the release of Trust. The single featured "Clean Money" and "Hoover Factory" on the B-side. "Clean Money"—which was rejected from Armed Forces in favour of "Accidents Will Happen"—was inspired by Cheap Trick's In Color and was dismissed by Costello as "an overly powdered-up rocker". "Hoover Factory", recorded in 1979, was written before Costello signed his first contract and was originally intended to be the B-side to the "Oliver's Army" single. "Clubland" was not released as a single in the United States, where "Watch Your Step" was released instead.

The "Clubland" single was a chart disappointment, only reaching number 60 on the British charts. This ended Costello's streak of nine Top 40 British singles that he had held since "Watching the Detectives" reached number 15. The second British single from Trust, "From a Whisper to a Scream", failed to chart at all, despite the guest appearance of Squeeze singer Glenn Tilbrook. Costello would return to the Top 40 in 1981, when "Good Year for the Roses" reached number six.

A music video for "Clubland" was produced to accompany the song's single release. Costello recalled, "The video was made on the rather sedate Channel Island of Jersey. I believe the young lady in the pink champagne scenes was actually the very respectable daughter of a local magistrate".

== Reception ==
Despite a lack of commercial success, "Clubland" has received positive reception from critics. Blender praised the song's "peerless acid-tongue", while Stephen Thomas Erlewine lauded its "jazzy flourishes". Stewart Mason of AllMusic labeled the song "both an entirely typical Elvis Costello song ... and a harbinger of a new and more mature sound" and noted that the "somewhat meandering melody of the verses ... contrast nicely with the urgent, pumping chorus". Jim Beviglia of American Songwriter ranked the song as the eleventh best Elvis Costello song ever, calling the song "a powerful indictment of any scene where greed and the pursuit of pleasure take the place of restraint and common sense".

Comedian Adam Carolla praised the song in his book In Fifty Years We'll All Be Chicks, writing of radio during the 1980s, "We could be hearing 'Clubland' by Elvis Costello or 'Stupefaction' by Graham Parker, but instead we get 'The Safety Dance' by Men Without Hats."

== Charts ==
Chart (1980)	Peak position
UK Singles (OCC)	60
