= Unfaithful Music & Disappearing Ink =

Album by Elvis Costello

Studio album by Elvis Costello
- Released: 2015
- Genre: Spoken word

Unfaithful Music & Disappearing Ink is a memoir and spoken word album by Elvis Costello. The album earned Costello a Grammy Award nomination for Best Spoken Word Album.
