= Elvis Costello =

English singer-songwriter (born 1954)

Elvis Costello OBE
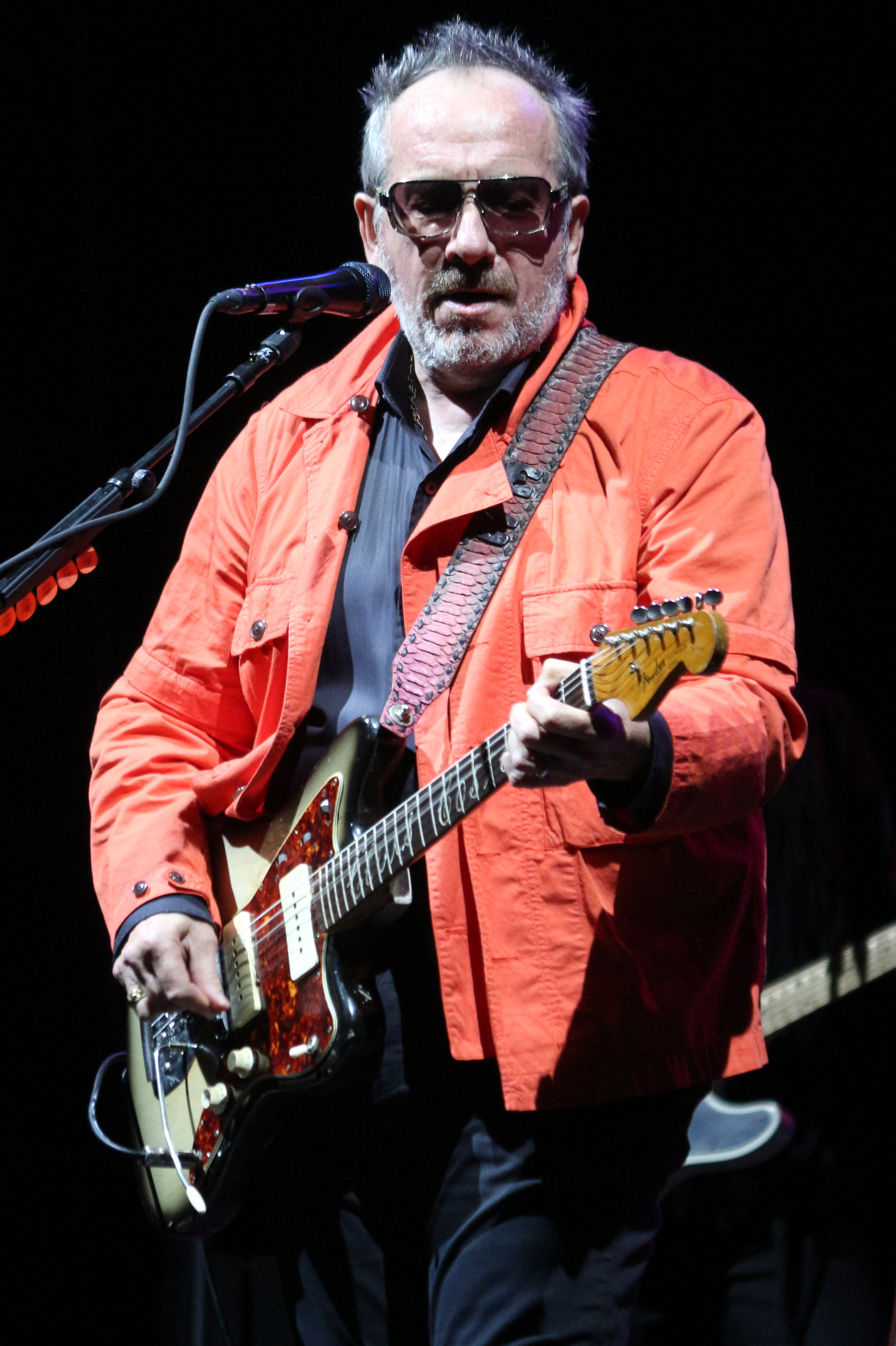
- Costello in 2021
- Born: Declan Patrick MacManus; 25 August 1954 (age 72); London, England
- Other names: Declan Costello; D.P. Costello; The Imposter; Little Hands of Concrete; Napoleon Dynamite; Howard Coward; MacManus; Elvis MacManus
- Spouses: Mary Burgoyne (m. 1974; div. 1984) Diana Krall (m. 2003)
- Partner: Cait O'Riordan (1985–2002)
- Father: Ross MacManus
- Musical career
- Genres: Rock; pop; new wave; power pop; punk rock; pub rock
- Occupations: Singer; songwriter; record producer; author; television host
- Instruments: Vocals; guitar; piano; harmonica; percussion
- Works: Discography; songs
- Years active: 1970–present
- Labels: Stiff; Radar; F-Beat; Demon; Columbia; Warner Bros.; Mercury; Island; Deutsche Grammophon; Lost Highway; Verve; Hear Music; Rykodisc; Rhino; Hip-O; Concord
- Member of: The New Basement Tapes
- Formerly of: The Attractions
- Website: elviscostello.com

Declan Patrick MacManus (born 25 August 1954), known professionally as Elvis Costello, is an English singer, songwriter, record producer, author, and television host. Per Rolling Stone, Costello "reinvigorated the literate, lyrical traditions of Bob Dylan and Van Morrison with the raw energy and sass that were principal ethics of punk", noting the "construction of his songs, which set densely layered wordplay in an ever-expanding repertoire of styles". He is the recipient of numerous accolades, including two Grammy Awards and two Ivor Novello Awards, and was inducted into the Rock and Roll Hall of Fame in 2003 and into the Songwriters Hall of Fame in 2016.

The son of musician Ross MacManus, Costello was raised with knowledge of a wide range of musical styles. His professional career as a musician coincided with the rise of punk rock in England. The primitivism brought into fashion by punk led Costello to disguise his musical knowledge at the beginning of his career, but his stylistic range has come to encompass R&B, country, jazz, baroque pop, Tin Pan Alley and classical music. His debut album, My Aim Is True (1977), produced no hit singles but contains some of his best-known songs, including the ballad "Alison". Costello's next two albums, This Year's Model (1978) and Armed Forces (1979), helped define the new wave. From late 1977 until early 1980, all of his singles reached the UK Top 30, including his biggest hit, "Oliver's Army" (1979). From 1977 until the early 2000s, Costello's albums regularly ranked high on The Village Voice's Pazz & Jop critics' poll, with This Year's Model and Imperial Bedroom (1982) voted the best album of their respective years. (Note: Costello's albums have appeared at these ranks on the Village Voice Pazz & Jop critics' poll: My Aim Is True (1977), number 2; This Year's Model (1978), number 1; Armed Forces (1979), number 5; Get Happy!! (1980), number 7; Trust (1981), number 3; Imperial Bedroom (1982), number 1; Punch the Clock (1983), number 11; King of America (1986), number 2; Blood and Chocolate (1986), number 9; Spike (1989), number 7; Brutal Youth (1994), number 31; Painted From Memory (1998), number 18; When I Was Cruel (2002), number 13; The River in Reverse (2006), number 32.) His biggest US hit single, "Veronica" (1989), reached No. 19 on the Billboard Hot 100.

For most of his early career, Costello performed with a backing band, the Attractions. He has released album-length collaborations with classical ensemble the Brodsky Quartet, R&B songwriter Allen Toussaint, and hip-hop group the Roots. His current backing band are known as the Imposters. Costello has written more than a dozen songs with Paul McCartney and had a long-running songwriting partnership with Burt Bacharach. He has had hits with cover versions of songs, including Sam & Dave's "I Can't Stand Up for Falling Down", Jerry Chesnut's "Good Year for the Roses", and Charles Aznavour's "She". One of his best-known songs, "(What's So Funny 'Bout) Peace, Love, and Understanding", was a cover of a song by Nick Lowe's group Brinsley Schwarz, which was obscure until Costello's 1979 version. Costello's own songs have been recorded by artists including Johnny Cash, Roy Orbison, Linda Ronstadt, George Jones, Dave Edmunds, Chet Baker and Alison Krauss. In 2003, he married the jazz singer Diana Krall.

From 2008 to 2010, he hosted a television show, Spectacle: Elvis Costello with.... He penned a well-received memoir, Unfaithful Music & Disappearing Ink (2015). In 2019, he was appointed an Officer of the Order of the British Empire for his services to music.

== Early life ==
Elvis Costello was born Declan Patrick MacManus (Note: Costello was born Declan Patrick MacManus. He changed his legal name to Elvis Costello after he became successful under that stage name, according to him, to rebut the insinuations of "smartarse customs officials" and "obnoxious journalists who accused me of being a novelty act". In 1985, he changed his legal name to Declan Patrick Aloysius MacManus. The extra middle name is a reference to a character played by the comedian Tony Hancock.) on 25 August 1954, at St Mary's Hospital in Paddington, west London, the only child of a record shop worker and a jazz musician. Both parents were from the Liverpool area and had moved to London together.

Costello's father was of Irish descent and a Roman Catholic, while his mother was English and was raised a Congregationalist. (Note: Some sources state that Costello's mother was of Irish descent and Catholic. However, in Unfaithful Music & Disappearing Ink, Costello writes that his maternal grandparents "were unusual for a Merseyside couple in not having any Irish, Scottish, or Welsh blood between them" and that his mother was raised Congregationalist.)

=== Family background ===
Costello's mother, Lillian MacManus (née Ablett, 1927–2021), was born and raised in Toxteth, Liverpool, the daughter of a gas-main layer and a mother who became increasingly disabled by rheumatoid arthritis as Lillian grew up. Responsible for caring for her younger brother and sick mother, Lillian left school at 13 and took the first of a series of jobs at music stores. After moving to London with her future husband Ross in 1951, she took a job in the record department in Selfridges department store and continued selling records through the 1960s. Even after she no longer worked selling records, Lillian maintained a keen interest in a wide variety of music, including the popular music of the day. Costello credits her with shaping his eclectic affinities: "There were just a lot of records, different kinds of records, around."

Costello's father, Ross MacManus, was a professional trumpet player and singer, born and raised in Birkenhead, across the River Mersey from Liverpool. He began his career in music in the late 1940s, playing trumpet in bebop bands in Birkenhead and Liverpool. He switched to playing trumpet and singing in modern jazz bands after moving to London in 1951. By 1954 he was sufficiently well known for his son's birth to be announced in the New Musical Express. From 1955 to 1968 he was a featured singer in the Joe Loss Orchestra, one of Britain's most popular big bands. Ross had a solo cabaret act from 1969 into the 1990s, playing workingmen's social clubs in Scotland, Wales, and the north of England. Ross recorded for small record labels under a variety of aliases, including Day Costello – Costello being Ross's paternal grandmother's maiden name. He also recorded advertising jingles.

Ross's father, Patrick Matthew McManus, (Note: Ross changed the spelling of his surname to MacManus early in his career as a musician.) known as Pat, was also a professional musician. From the age of eight, Pat was raised in an orphanage where he learned to play trumpet. He later played trumpet as an army bandsman, a ship's musician for the White Star Line, and an orchestra musician in music halls and in theatres showing silent films. Costello has said that Pat, being the first in the family to make a career in music, is the reason he himself is a musician.

=== Childhood and early musical influences ===
Costello spent most of his childhood in Twickenham, in western Greater London, before moving to Liverpool with his mother in 1970. Costello was raised Roman Catholic and served as an altar boy until he was 14.

Costello's parents had separated by the time Costello was 10 years old, after which he was raised by his mother. Ross continued to be a significant presence in Costello's life, and the two remained close until Ross's death in 2011. Costello has said that a childhood spent watching his father work gave him an innate sense of how to be a musician but also an understanding that a career in music was a job like any other, requiring discipline and hard work.

Costello's parents never insisted he take music lessons or otherwise pushed him to follow in the family business. Lillian told journalists that she knew before Costello was born he would have a career in music and that she listened to a broad range of music while she was pregnant with him with the intention of giving him an early start in music appreciation.

As a child, Costello's musical influences came from his parents' record collection, which encompassed a wide range of styles but centred on traditional pop and jazz. Ross's job with the Joe Loss Orchestra required him to sing many of the pop hits of the day for the band's weekly radio show. To learn these songs, Ross received demonstration copies of the original artists' records, which he brought home to rehearse. When Costello grew old enough to have an interest in the current pop hits, Ross began giving him five or six of these demonstration records per week. Costello has said, "That's why I know so many songs".

Costello's favourites among the hit-makers of the day were the Beatles. He has said that, having turned nine years old in 1963, he was exactly the right age to experience the full force of Beatles fandom as he grew up. He has described them as his biggest musical influence. Costello was also deeply impressed by the songs of his future collaborator Burt Bacharach, which he knew through the hits British artists Cilla Black and Dusty Springfield had with them.

As Costello grew into his teens, his favourites included British beat groups the Kinks, Small Faces, and the Who, Jamaican rocksteady and reggae acts who were popular in Britain, and especially Motown artists, whose work he knew through their British hit singles and through the Motown Chartbusters compilations. By the time he reached his mid-teens, Joni Mitchell had become an important influence. Upon moving to Liverpool, he found he did not enjoy much of the prog rock that was popular with his peers, and so, searching for music he might like, he developed an interest in the Grateful Dead and folk rock bands like the Band and the Byrds, whose Sweetheart of the Rodeo turned him on to country music.

=== Education and decision to pursue a career in music ===
Costello was a well-behaved if sometimes argumentative student, but not generally an outstanding one. Not having scored well enough on his eleven-plus exams to go on to grammar school, he attended Archbishop Myers secondary modern school in Hounslow and then a comprehensive school in Everton, Liverpool, for sixth form. (Note: Some sources incorrectly state that Costello attended the grammar school St Francis Xavier's College, Liverpool. He did not. He attended Campion Catholic High School in Everton, Liverpool a comprehensive school that had previously shared a campus with St Francis Xavier's College when the combined schools were known as St Francis Xavier Bi-Lateral School.) Costello showed an early talent for writing. His mother told a journalist that, when Costello was 11 years old, his school entered him into a writing contest held by The Times intended for people aged 16 to 25, for which he won a prize. As he finished secondary school, he earned one A-level, in English, despite having made a firm decision to pursue a career in music a few months earlier and putting little effort into his final months of school.

Although he never had any alternative career plan, Costello had previously been reluctant to commit to a career in music, partly because his upbringing had made him aware of the potential pitfalls involved. The shock of witnessing a teenage friend's death in a traffic accident changed his mind. He would later write, "Suddenly, everything but music seemed like a waste of precious time".

Costello completed his formal education in 1972 and, still living with his mother, set out to find a job that would earn him a steady wage while he pursued a career in music. He soon took a job as a computer operator at the Midland Bank data centre, in Bootle, because, at £20 a week, it paid slightly better than other unskilled work for which he felt he was qualified. (Note: Britain had no national minimum wage in 1972, but £20 a week, when adjusted for inflation, is approximately equal to 75% of the 2023 national minimum wage for 18- to 20-year-olds.) According to Costello, the job consisted of essentially manual labour such as mounting tape reels and loading punched cards. Because the job involved frequent periods of waiting for the mainframe computers to complete their tasks before beginning them on the next one, it gave Costello time to write songs while at work. Except for a few months in 1973 when he worked as a clerk at the Midland Bank Putney branch, he continued to work full-time as a computer operator until a few weeks before his first album was released in July 1977.

== Career ==
=== 1969–1976: Pre-professional career ===
Costello began writing songs and teaching himself to play guitar by age 14. To test his songs in front of an audience, he performed in folk clubs that allowed amateur musicians to perform unpaid. He played these clubs regularly in London and continued in similar clubs when he moved to Liverpool at age 16, although folk music venues that welcomed original songs were scarcer in Liverpool. By 17, he was occasionally being paid a little money. On the eve of the release of his debut album in 1977, Costello told Allan Jones that he had written hundreds of songs.

==== Rusty ====
Early in 1972, Allan Mayes invited Costello to join his folk rock band Rusty. As other members left, Rusty soon became a duo, with Mayes and Costello singing and playing acoustic guitars. For a little over a year, Rusty played regularly in small venues like pubs, clubs, schools, and community centres, mostly in and around Liverpool, unpaid or for small amounts of money. In Mayes's estimation, Costello was already a talented songwriter, able to quickly write songs in a variety of styles, and could sing like Neil Young or Robbie Robertson. While in Rusty, Costello wrote an early version of "Ghost Train", although when he recorded it in 1980 little remained of the Rusty version except the central narrative idea of a married double act making their way through the low end of show business. Mayes has said he introduced Costello to Brinsley Schwarz, a band that would be an important influence.

==== Declan Costello ====
By early 1973, Costello had determined that the music scene in Liverpool was too small to support his ambitions, so he transferred from a computer operator in the Midland Bank data centre in Bootle to a position as a clerk at the bank's Putney branch. Returning to Greater London, Costello moved into the same Twickenham flat where he had lived with his mother a few years earlier, by then occupied by his father Ross, Ross's second wife, and their infant son. When booking himself into London clubs, he began using the name Declan Costello, adopting a family name that Ross had once made a record under, because it was easier to spell and understand than MacManus when he spoke on the phone. Costello's first professional recording session, in the company of Ross, was for R. White's "Secret Lemonade Drinker" jingle. Ross sang the lead vocal while Costello played guitar and sang backing vocals. (Note: In a little-seen version of the television commercial, in which the lemonade drinker fantasises that he is a singer in a nightclub, Costello and his father mimed instruments as members of the singer's band. (Note: Some sources incorrectly state that Ross is the actor seen singing the jingle in the television ads, the writer of the jingle, or both. The onscreen actor is Julian Chagrin). The jingle was written by Rod Allen, the jingle-writing member for the advertising agency Allen, Brady, and Marsh.)

==== Flip City ====
Later in 1973, Costello formed Flip City with fellow folk rock fans. The group played the London pub rock circuit until the end of 1975, occasionally opening for more prominent bands such as Dr. Feelgood, but generally making little money and attracting little notice. Flip City's performances consisted of a mix of Costello's original songs (some of which would appear on his first two albums) and covers of rock, R&B and country songs. Costello wrote all but one of Flip City's original songs, did most of the singing and chose the cover songs they played. None of the other members of Flip City shared Costello's commitment to pursuing a career in music and some disapproved of his desire to make money from his music.

Costello became engaged to marry a former schoolmate in late 1973. By then he had found a job as a computer operator at the Elizabeth Arden cosmetics factory in North Acton, in northwest London, similar to the one he had in Bootle and with similarly low wages. By early 1975, Costello was a husband and father and was struggling to support his family. Flip City's live engagements added little to his income, rarely paying more than the band's expenses.

Costello recorded demos with Flip City at several sessions from mid-1974 until mid-1975, hoping to use them to get live bookings, secure a recording contract, or sell Costello's songs for other artists to record. All but the first of these sessions were at a small studio owned by Dave Robinson, future Stiff Records founder. Robinson later said that he thought Flip City "could not play at all" but Costello was talented and ought to "find a real band".

==== D.P. Costello ====
Even before disbanding Flip City in late 1975, Costello was writing songs he did not include in the band's repertoire. He recorded some of these as solo demos for Dave Robinson in mid-1975. For the next year, he shopped these and other solo demos to music publishers and record companies, hoping to be hired either as a songwriter or a recording artist. He sent out as many as 20 songs on a single tape to publishers, not yet realising that no publisher would have the patience to listen to so many songs. Sometimes he went to publishers' offices to perform his songs in person. None of this generated anything but rejections until he began creating "show reels" of no more than six of what he believed were his most attention-getting songs, selected to appeal to the recipient of each demo tape. (Note: Sources prior to 2015 state that Costello sent the six songs he sent to Charlie Gillett, often referred to as The Honky Tonk Demos, to everyone he sent demos to during this period, including Stiff Records. However, in his 2015 memoir, Unfaithful Music & Disappearing Ink, Costello states that his notebooks from this period indicate he was sending a different set of songs to each recipient. The deluxe ebook edition reproduces handwritten notebook pages illustrating this.)

By February 1976, Costello was booking himself into clubs as a solo act under the name D.P. Costello, D.P. being his initials and a family nickname. While working as D.P. Costello, he learned to sing and play guitar very loudly and developed a forceful stage presence, although he was still playing to small audiences for very little money. Few of the songs he had played with Flip City were included in these performances. Instead, he was debuting some of the songs that would start to get the attention of the music industry, such as "Mystery Dance" and "Wave a White Flag". Costello included both songs on a six-track demo tape he sent to London radio presenter Charlie Gillett, who thought "Wave a White Flag" was the best of the six. Gillett played several songs from the tape on his radio show later that year, the first time any Costello song received airplay. (Note: After Costello became successful, the six songs he sent to Gillett were widely bootlegged. They received an official release as bonus tracks on the 1993 and 2001 reissues of My Aim Is True.)

Sometime in 1976, lack of money forced Costello, his wife and their toddler son to move in with relatives near Heathrow Airport, on the far west side of Greater London. This meant Costello's commute to work in North Acton took him past the Hoover Building in Perivale. Around the same time, he was becoming aware of the nascent punk movement, although he would not hear any of the British punk bands until they began releasing records. Songs he wrote during this period included "Hoover Factory" and "Radio Sweetheart", which became the B-side of his first single.

=== 1976–1977: My Aim Is True ===
In mid-August 1976, Costello was signed to the independent label Stiff Records. Following a successful test-session in mid-September 1976 at Pathway Studios, an inexpensive studio in North London, Stiff agreed to finance more sessions for Costello with Clover, an American country-rock group, as the backing band. Throughout late November or early December, Costello rehearsed with Clover at Headley Grange in East Hampshire, after which he recorded the songs properly with the band the next day at Pathway. The sessions were spaced over several weeks to accommodate his full-time work schedule and Stiff's tight finances. My Aim Is True was recorded and mixed in six four-hour sessions for a total cost of about £1,000. The sessions were produced by Nick Lowe, Stiff's first artist and in-house producer.

By February 1977, Stiff founders Jake Riviera and Dave Robinson, who were now Costello's managers, had given him his new stage name, Elvis. The reference to Elvis Presley, who was still alive at the time, was intended to get attention. The managers also developed Costello's image, particularly the large black glasses. Costello's first single, "Less than Zero", was released at the end of March 1977. It received a few brief, mixed reviews in the British music press and sold very few copies. Two further singles, "Alison" and "(The Angels Wanna Wear My) Red Shoes", also sold poorly; the former would become one of his best-known songs. Nevertheless, Costello was receiving increasingly prominent, positive coverage in the British music press.

My Aim Is True was released in the UK in July 1977. Its delayed release was because Stiff had wanted to release records by other artists who seemed more tied to transient music trends and then because of legal difficulties with Stiff's distributor, Island Records. The album received extensive, favourable coverage in the UK music press, and reached No. 14 on the UK Albums Chart within a few weeks of its release. Around this time, Costello recorded "Watching the Detectives" at Pathway with bassist Andrew Bodnar and drummer Steve Goulding of the Rumour, with organ and piano overdubs by keyboardist Steve Nieve. The song was a departure from the sound of My Aim Is True, displaying reggae-style rhythms. It was inspired by the Clash's debut album and by Bernard Herrmann's Hitchcock scores. Costello later called it his "first real record". It was released in mid-October as a non-album single in the UK, reaching No. 15, becoming Costello's first single to chart in any country; it appeared on the US version of My Aim Is True, released in early November through Columbia Records. It charted at No. 32 on the US Billboard Top LPs & Tape chart and was named among the best albums of the year by US music critics.

=== 1977–1979: Peak pop stardom ===
In mid-June 1977, Costello held auditions for a bassist and keyboardist for a backing band for a tour to promote My Aim Is True, wanting a sparser sound than on the album. Pete Thomas, formerly of pub-rock band Chilli Willi and the Red Hot Peppers, who were managed by Riviera, agreed to be drummer, although Thomas was then living in California and needed to be brought back to England. Goulding and Bodnar also participated in these audition sessions, so that Costello could test how the musicians auditioning played as part of a band. Chosen were bassist Bruce Thomas (no relation to Pete), who was 28 years old and had ten years' experience in professional bands, the most successful being the Sutherland Brothers and Quiver; and keyboardist Steve Nieve (then Steve Nason), a 19-year-old student at the Royal College of Music who had formal musical training but no experience in any kind of pop group. The band, soon named the Attractions, would be Costello's touring and recording band for the next seven years.

When Costello began touring the US in mid-November, he received prominent coverage in the US press, even though he played venues holding fewer than a thousand people. By late 1977, Costello had moved from Stiff Records to Radar Records, a new label founded by an associate of Jake Riviera. Riviera had split from Dave Robinson and was now Costello's sole manager. For the next year and a half, Costello's records were released on Radar in Britain.

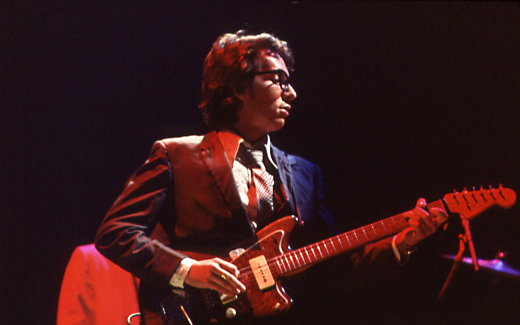
Costello onstage at Massey Hall, Toronto, April 1978

Costello recorded his second album and his first with the Attractions, This Year's Model, during short breaks from touring, from November 1977 through January 1978. Produced by Nick Lowe, it was recorded at Eden Studios, in west London, in eleven days. Inspirations for the album's sound included 1960s beat bands like the Who, the Kinks and Small Faces, as well as contemporary acts like Talking Heads, but the biggest influence was the Rolling Stones's Aftermath (1966).

"(I Don't Want to Go to) Chelsea" was released as the album's first single in early March 1978, reaching No. 16 on the UK singles chart. The second single, "Pump It Up", which reached No. 24, was written later, while Costello was on tour with other Stiff acts, in reaction to what he later called his "first exposure to idiotic rock and roll decadence". Upon release in March, This Year's Model entered the UK Albums Chart at No. 4. The US version of the album dropped "(I Don't Want to Go to) Chelsea" and "Night Rally", a song written in response to the rise of the British National Front, and replaced them with "Radio Radio". The US release reached No. 30 on the Billboard chart but spent fewer weeks on the chart than My Aim Is True. "Radio Radio" was released as a non-album single in the UK in October 1978, where it reached No. 29. This Year's Model placed first in the Village Voice's annual Pazz & Jop poll.

Throughout 1978, Costello and the Attractions continued touring Britain, Europe and North America, playing larger venues and debuting new songs that Costello was writing for his next album. In July 1978, Costello performed at the Danish Roskilde Festival, topping the bill with three other artists.

Costello and the Attractions recorded his third album, Armed Forces, at Eden Studios in six weeks from August and September 1978. Costello said of the album's influences, "If you're sitting in a station wagon driving from Georgia to Madison, Wisconsin and listening to Bowie's Low and "Heroes" and Iggy Pop's The Idiot and ABBA's Greatest Hits over and over again, that's the kind of record you'll make!" It was again produced by Lowe, but Costello provided greater creative control. Released in early January 1979, Armed Forces debuted at number two on the UK Albums Chart, and spent 28 weeks on the chart. In the US, it spent 25 weeks on the Billboard chart, peaking at No. 10 in mid-March. The US release replaced "Sunday's Best" with Costello's cover of Lowe's "(What's So Funny 'Bout) Peace, Love, and Understanding". Costello's best-selling single, "Oliver's Army", was released in Britain in February, reaching No. 2 on the UK singles chart. It was also his biggest hit single in Ireland, reaching No. 4 on the Irish singles chart. The second single, "Accidents Will Happen", was released in early May, charting at No. 28 in the UK. In the US, it reached No. 101, missing the Billboard Hot 100 but charting higher than any previous Costello single.

The concert tour promoting Armed Forces was marked by bad publicity. Costello and the Attractions played some shows that audiences considered too brief and refused to return for encores. Audiences in Sydney, Australia, and Berkeley, California, responded by vandalising the concert venues. After a concert in Columbus, Ohio, on 15 March, Costello got into a drunken argument at a hotel bar with members of the Stephen Stills band and entourage. The argument culminated in Costello disparaging James Brown and Ray Charles with racist insults, in comments he would later call "the exact opposite of my true feelings". When Costello's comments were reported in the press a few weeks later, the bad publicity was sufficiently severe and widespread to be regarded, including by Costello himself, as the reason he never achieved the top-level commercial success in the US that had been predicted for him.

In June, Costello had a hit as a songwriter when Dave Edmunds released his recording of "Girls Talk", a song Costello had written but not yet recorded. Edmunds' version reached No. 4 on the UK singles chart and No. 65 on Billboard Hot 100.

=== 1980–1984: Commercial dwindling ===
Costello's Get Happy!! (1980) featured a sound based on vintage American soul music. Some songs marked a distinct change from the cynical tone of his first three albums to a happier manner. The single, "I Can't Stand Up for Falling Down", was a cover of a Sam and Dave song. Lyrically, the songs are full of Costello's signature wordplay. His only North American appearance in 1980 was at the Heatwave festival near Toronto.

In January 1981, Costello released Trust amidst growing tensions within the Attractions. The single "Watch Your Step" was released in the US only and played live on Tom Snyder's Tomorrow show, and received airplay on FM rock radio. In the UK, "Clubland" scraped the lower reaches of the UK singles chart; follow-up single "From a Whisper to a Scream" (a duet with Glenn Tilbrook of Squeeze) became the first Costello single in over four years to completely miss the chart. Costello also co-produced Squeeze's 1981 album East Side Story (with Roger Béchirian) and performed backing vocals on the group's hit "Tempted".

October saw the release of Almost Blue, a country music cover album containing songs by Hank Williams ("Why Don't You Love Me (Like You Used to Do)?)"), Merle Haggard ("Tonight The Bottle Let Me Down"), Gram Parsons ("How Much I've Lied") and George Jones ("Brown to Blue"). It received mixed reviews. The first pressings of the record in the UK bore a sticker with the message: "WARNING: This album contains country & western music and may cause a radical reaction in narrow minded listeners". Almost Blue did spawn a surprise UK hit single with a version of Jerry Chesnut's "Good Year for the Roses", which reached number six. Costello had been an avid country music fan and has cited Jones as his favourite country singer. He had appeared on Jones's duet album My Very Special Guests, contributing "Stranger in the House", which they later performed together on a 1981 HBO special dedicated to Jones.

Imperial Bedroom (1982) featured lavish production by Geoff Emerick, engineer of several Beatles records. Robert Palmer wrote "the music is a sumptuous mélange of pop styles, from Beatles-baroque to Phil Spector Wall-of-Sound to torch-song intimacy." It failed to produce a hit single—"You Little Fool" and the critically acclaimed "Man Out of Time" failed to reach the Top 40 in the UK. Costello collaborated with Squeeze's Chris Difford to write "Boy With a Problem". Costello has said he disliked the marketing pitch for the album. Imperial Bedroom also featured Costello's song "Almost Blue", inspired by jazz singer and trumpeter Chet Baker. Baker later recorded his own version of the song. Imperial Bedroom was promoted with the tagline "Masterpiece?" It placed first on the Pazz & Jop poll.

In 1983, he released Punch the Clock, featuring female backing vocal duo Afrodiziak and four-piece horn section the TKO Horns, alongside the Attractions. Clive Langer (who co-produced with Alan Winstanley), provided Costello with a melody which eventually became "Shipbuilding", which featured a trumpet solo by Baker and ironic commentary on the Falklands War. Prior to the release of Costello's original, a cover of the song was a minor UK hit for Soft Machine founder Robert Wyatt.

Under the pseudonym The Imposter, Costello released "Pills and Soap", an attack on the changes in British society brought on by Thatcherism, released to coincide with the run-up to the 1983 UK general election. Punch the Clock also generated an international hit in the single "Everyday I Write the Book", aided by a music video featuring lookalikes of Prince Charles and Princess Diana undergoing domestic strife in a suburban home. The song became Costello's first Top 40 hit single in the US. Also in the same year, Costello provided vocals on a version of the Madness song "Tomorrow's Just Another Day" released as a B-side.

Tensions within the band – notably between Costello and bassist Bruce Thomas – were beginning to tell, and Costello announced his retirement and the break-up of the group shortly before they were to record Goodbye Cruel World (1984). Daryl Hall provided backing vocals on the single "The Only Flame in Town", which became Costello's lowest UK chart placement up to that point at number 71. Costello later expressed disappointment with the final album's production, describing it as "probably the worst record that I could have made of a decent bunch of songs". The record was poorly received upon its initial release; the liner notes to the 1995 Rykodisc re-release, penned by Costello, begin with the words "Congratulations! You've just purchased our worst album". Costello's retirement, although short-lived, was accompanied by two compilations, The Best of Elvis Costello – The Man in the UK, Europe and Australia, and The Best of Elvis Costello & The Attractions in the US and Canada.

=== 1985–1989: Initial collaborations ===
In 1985, Costello sang the Beatles' "All You Need Is Love" at Wembley Stadium for Live Aid. He introduced it as an "old northern English folk song" and invited the audience to sing the chorus. He joined T Bone Burnett for the single "The People's Limousine" under the moniker of the Coward Brothers. He sang with Annie Lennox on "Adrian" from the Eurythmics record Be Yourself Tonight. Costello produced Rum Sodomy & the Lash (1985) by Celtic punk band the Pogues. He said his "task was to capture them in their dilapidated glory."

Growing antipathy between Costello and Bruce Thomas contributed to the Attractions' first split in 1986 when Costello was preparing to make a comeback. Working in the US with Burnett, a band containing a number of Elvis Presley's sidemen (including James Burton and Jerry Scheff), and minor input from the Attractions, he produced King of America, an acoustic guitar-driven album with a country sound. It was billed as performed by "The Costello Show featuring the Attractions and Confederates" in the UK and Europe and "The Costello Show featuring Elvis Costello" in North America. Around this time he legally changed his name back to Declan MacManus, adding Aloysius as an extra middle name. Costello retooled his upcoming tour to allow for multiple nights in each city, playing one night with the Confederates, one night with the Attractions, and one night solo acoustic. In May 1986, he performed at Self Aid, a benefit concert held in Dublin that focused on the chronic unemployment which was widespread in Ireland.

Costello reunited with the Attractions to record Blood & Chocolate, which was lauded for a post-punk fervour not heard since 1978's This Year's Model. It also marked the return of Nick Lowe, who had produced Costello's first five albums. While Blood & Chocolate failed to chart a hit single of any significance, it did produce what has since become one of Costello's signature concert songs, "I Want You". On this album, Costello adopted the alias Napoleon Dynamite, the name he later attributed to the character of the emcee that he played during the vaudeville-style tour to support Blood & Chocolate. (The pseudonym had previously been used in 1982, when the B-side single "Imperial Bedroom" was credited to Napoleon Dynamite & the Royal Guard. After the tour for Blood & Chocolate, Costello split from the Attractions, due mostly to lingering tensions between him and Bruce Thomas. Costello continued to work with another Attraction, Pete Thomas, as a session musician for future releases.

Costello's contract with Columbia Records ended after Blood & Chocolate. In 1987 he released a compilation album, Out of Our Idiot, consisting of B-sides, side projects, and unreleased songs from recording sessions from 1980 to 1987. He signed a new contract with Warner Bros. and in early 1989 released Spike, which spawned his biggest single in the US, "Veronica". It was one of several songs Costello co-wrote with Paul McCartney. At the 1989 MTV Video Music Awards on 6 September in Los Angeles, "Veronica" won the MTV Award for Best Male Video.

Costello and McCartney wrote several songs together over a short period, which were released over a number of years:

- "Back On My Feet", the B-side of McCartney's 1987 single "Once Upon a Long Ago", later added as a bonus track on the 1993 re-issue of McCartney's Flowers in the Dirt
- "Veronica" and "Pads, Paws and Claws" from his album Spike (1989)
- McCartney's "My Brave Face", "Don't Be Careless Love", "That Day Is Done" and the McCartney/Costello duet "You Want Her Too", all from McCartney's Flowers in the Dirt (1989)
- "So Like Candy" and "Playboy to a Man" from Costello's Mighty Like a Rose (1991)
- "The Lovers That Never Were" and "Mistress and Maid" from McCartney's Off the Ground (1993).
- "Shallow Grave" from Costello's All This Useless Beauty (1996).
- Costello has also issued solo demo recordings of "Veronica", "Pads, Paws and Claws" and "Mistress and Maid" (a song he did not otherwise record). Two other McCartney/Costello compositions remained officially unissued, while existing as widely bootlegged demos ("Tommy's Coming Home" and "Twenty Fine Fingers"). These two tracks, along with demos of other songs from their collaboration, did eventually see release on the Paul McCartney Archive edition of Flowers in the Dirt.

In 1987, Costello appeared on Roy Orbison and Friends, A Black and White Night, a tribute to his long-time idol Roy Orbison. Costello co-wrote "The Other End (Of the Telescope)" with Aimee Mann. It appears on Everything's Different Now (1988) by Mann's band 'Til Tuesday.

=== 1990s: Collaborations, soundtracks and brief Attractions reunion ===
In 1991, Costello released Mighty Like a Rose, featuring the single "The Other Side of Summer". With Richard Harvey, he co-composed the score for Alan Bleasdale's mini-series G.B.H.. The score secured them a BAFTA.

In 1993, Costello collaborated with the Brodsky Quartet on The Juliet Letters. It was inspired by a piece in The Guardian about letters to Shakespeare's Juliet Capulet. Cellist Jacqueline Thomas notes "quotes from or references to music we love – and varied musical styles to suit the songs, from Bachian suspensions in 'Deliver Us', to flamenco riffs in 'Romeo’s Seance', a hurdy-gurdy effect built from a Bartók chord in 'Who Do You Think You Are?'"

During this period, he wrote a full album's worth of material for Wendy James, and these songs became the tracks on her 1993 solo album Now Ain't the Time for Your Tears. Costello returned to rock and roll the following year with a project that reunited him with the Attractions, Brutal Youth. In 1995, he released Kojak Variety, an album of cover songs recorded five years earlier, and followed in 1996 with an album of songs originally written for other artists, All This Useless Beauty. This was the final album of original material that he issued under his Warner Bros. contract, and also his final album with the Attractions.

In 1994, he duetted with Tony Bennett on "They Can't Take That Away from Me" on MTV Unplugged, appearing on the album released from the broadcast.

In the spring of 1996, Costello played a series of intimate club dates, backed only by Steve Nieve on the piano, in support of All This Useless Beauty. An ensuing mid-year tour with the Attractions proved to be the death knell, with relations between Costello and bassist Bruce Thomas at a breaking point, Costello announced that the current tour would be the Attractions' last. The quartet performed their final US show in Seattle, Washington on 1 September 1996, before wrapping up their tour in Japan. Costello continued to work frequently with Attractions Steve Nieve and Pete Thomas; eventually, both became members of Costello's new back-up band, The Imposters.

Costello had served as artistic chair for the 1995 Meltdown Festival, which gave him the opportunity to explore his increasingly eclectic musical interests. His involvement in the festival yielded Deep Dead Blue, a one-off live EP with jazz guitarist Bill Frisell, which featured both cover material and a few of his own songs. To fulfill his contractual obligations to Warner Bros., Costello released the greatest hits album Extreme Honey (1997). It contained an original track titled "The Bridge I Burned", featuring Costello's son Matt on bass.

In 1998, Costello signed a multi-label contract with Polygram Records, sold by its parent company the same year to become part of the Universal Music Group. Costello released his new work on what he deemed the suitable imprimatur within the family of labels. His first new release as part of this contract involved a collaboration with Burt Bacharach. Their work had commenced earlier, in 1996, on "God Give Me Strength" for the movie Grace of My Heart. This led the pair to write and record the acclaimed album Painted From Memory, released under his new contract in 1998, on the Mercury Records label, featuring songs that were largely inspired by the dissolution of his relationship with Cait O'Riordan. Costello and Bacharach performed several concerts with full orchestral backing, and also recorded an updated version of Bacharach's "I'll Never Fall in Love Again" for the soundtrack to Austin Powers: The Spy Who Shagged Me, with both appearing in the film to perform the song. He also wrote "I Throw My Toys Around" for The Rugrats Movie and performed it with No Doubt. The same year, he collaborated with Paddy Moloney of the Chieftains on "The Long Journey Home" on the soundtrack of The Irish in America: Long Journey Home. The soundtrack won a Grammy Award in 1999.

Costello contributed a cover of Charles Aznavour's "She", produced by Trevor Jones to the soundtrack of Notting Hill (1999). Costello's cover reached number 19 on the UK singles chart. He co-wrote another song with Mann, "The Fall of the World's Own Optimist", for her album Bachelor No. 2 (2000).

=== 2000s: Continued collaborations, the Imposters and solo work ===
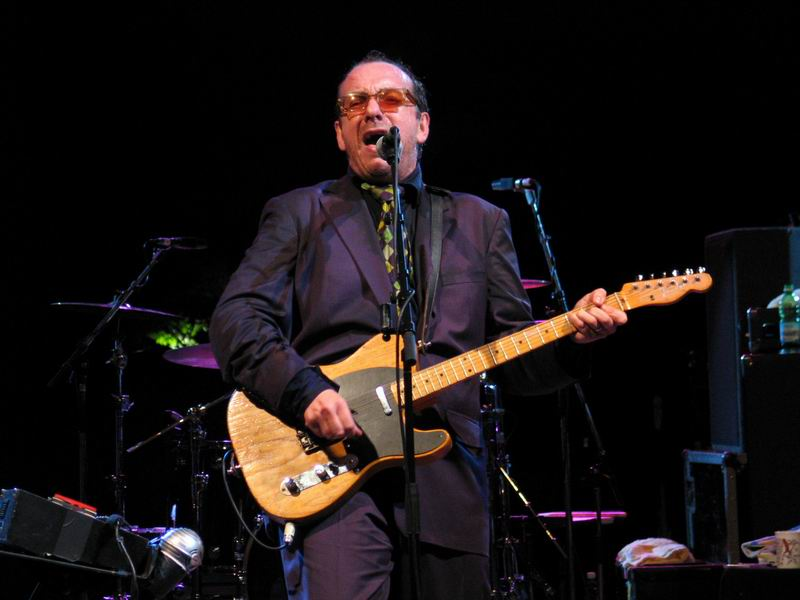
Costello performing at Glastonbury, 2005

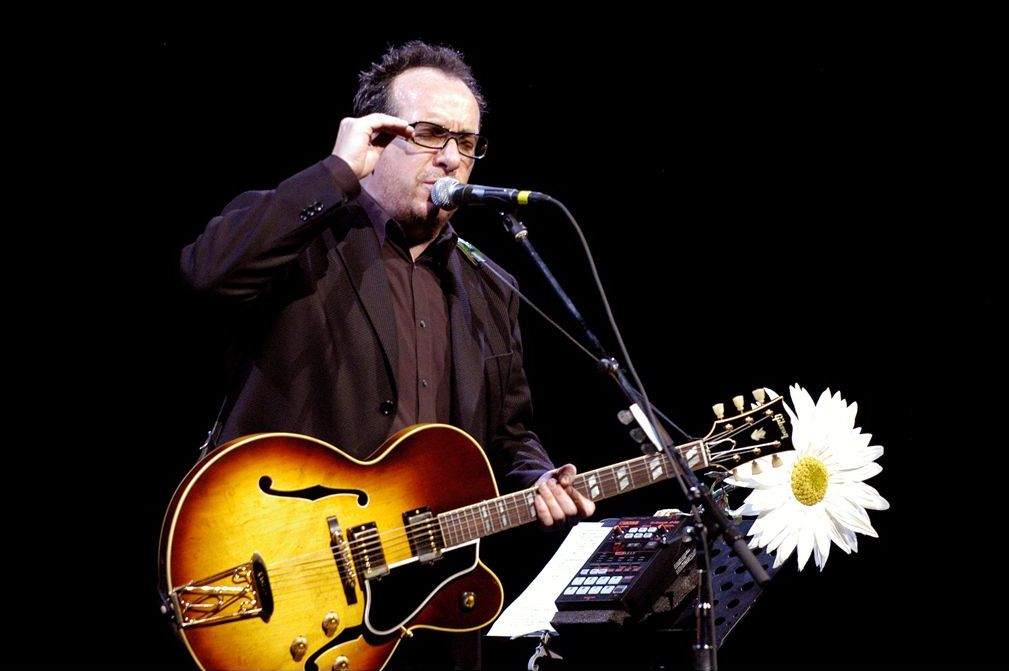
Costello performing in 2006

From 2001 to 2005, Costello re-issued his back catalogue in the US, from My Aim Is True (1977) to All This Useless Beauty (1996), on double-disc collections on the Rhino Records label. These releases, which each contained second discs of bonus material, ultimately fell out of print by 2007 after Universal Music acquired the rights to Costello's catalogue. Universal subsequently released new deluxe editions of My Aim Is True and This Year's Model with new bonus material of full-length concerts from the time of each album's release. These deluxe editions also fell out of print and Universal has reverted to re-releasing Costello's pre-1987 albums in their original context without bonus material. His accompanying essays were well-received.

In 2000, Costello appeared at the Town Hall, New York, in Steve Nieve's opera Welcome to the Voice, alongside Ron Sexsmith and John Flansburgh of They Might Be Giants. Ann Powers wrote "A new patch on the border between art music and pop is being cultivated, and Elvis Costello is its chief gardener. Even when he was an angry young punk, Mr. Costello wrote unusually intricate melodies and lyrics. Now, at 45, he seeds his compositions with overt jazz and classical influences and uses his popularity to promote the work of equally ambitious hybridizers."

In 2001, Costello was artist-in-residence at UCLA and wrote the music for a new ballet. He produced and appeared on For the Stars, an album of pop songs with the classical singer Anne Sofie von Otter. He released When I Was Cruel (2002) on Island Records. He toured with a new band, the Imposters (essentially the Attractions but with a different bass player, Davey Faragher, formerly of Cracker).

On 23 February 2003, Costello, Bruce Springsteen, Steven Van Zandt and Dave Grohl performed the Clash's "London Calling" at the 45th Grammy Awards in honour of Clash frontman Joe Strummer, who had died the previous December. In March, Elvis Costello & the Attractions were inducted into the Rock and Roll Hall of Fame. In May, he announced his engagement to Canadian jazz singer and pianist Diana Krall, whom he had seen in concert and then met backstage at the Sydney Opera House. That September, he released North, an album of piano-based ballads concerning the breakdown of his former marriage and his falling in love with Krall.

"The Scarlet Tide", co-written by Costello and T Bone Burnett for the film Cold Mountain (2003), was nominated for an Academy Award for Best Original Song; he performed it at the awards ceremony with Alison Krauss, who sang it on the official soundtrack. Costello co-wrote many songs on Krall's The Girl in the Other Room (2004), her first album to feature several original compositions.

In July 2004, Costello's first full-scale orchestral work, Il Sogno, was performed in New York. A ballet based on Shakespeare's A Midsummer Night's Dream, it was commissioned by Italian dance troupe Aterballeto. It received acclaim from classical critics. Christina Roden noted "touches of Duke Ellington, George Gershwin, and Igor Stravinsky. Recurring saxophone riffs mirror orchestrations by Serge Prokofiev and Maurice Ravel, while eerie ripples of cimbolom (a folkloric hammered dulcimer) are straight out of Béla Bartok. Costello's use of leitmotif tidily depicts characters and subplots." Performed by the London Symphony Orchestra, conducted by Michael Tilson Thomas, the recording was released on CD in September by Deutsche Grammophon. He simultaneously released The Delivery Man, recorded in Oxford, Mississippi, on Lost Highway Records.

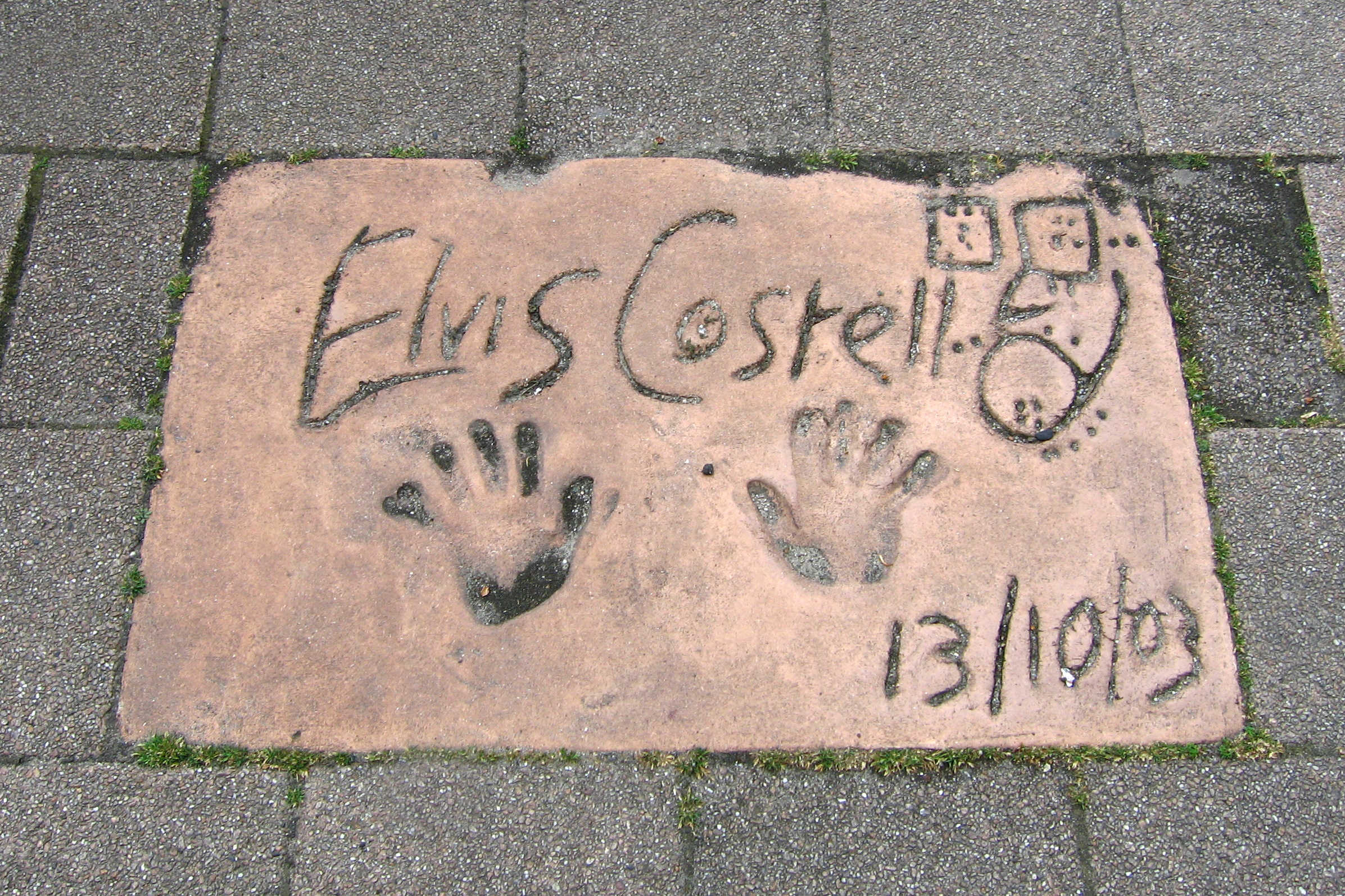
Costello's hand prints on the European Walk of Fame, Rotterdam

A CD recording of a collaboration with Marian McPartland on her show Piano Jazz was released in 2005. It featured Costello singing six jazz standards and two of his own songs, accompanied by McPartland on piano.

A 2005 tour included a gig at Glastonbury that Costello considered so dreadful that he said "I don't care if I ever play England again. That gig made up my mind I wouldn't come back. I don't get along with it. We lost touch. It's 25 years since I lived there. I don't dig it, they don't dig me....British music fans don't have the same attitude to age as they do in America, where young people come to check out, say Willie Nelson. They feel some connection with him and find a role for that music in their lives".

In November, Costello started recording an album with Joe Henry and Allen Toussaint. Costello had a collaborative history with Toussaint, beginning with a couple of scattered songs in the 1980s. In September 2006, Costello and Allen Toussaint performed in New York at a series of benefit concerts for victims of Hurricane Katrina. By week's end, Costello had written The River in Reverse and performed it with Toussaint. Costello sang Paul Simon's "American Tune" to reflect the national malaise.

In a studio recording of Nieve's opera Welcome to the Voice (2006, Deutsche Grammophon), Costello interpreted the character of Chief of Police, with Barbara Bonney, Robert Wyatt, Sting and Amanda Roocroft, and the album reached No. 2 in the Billboard classical charts. Costello later reprised the piece on the stage of the Théâtre du Châtelet in Paris in 2008, with Sting, Joe Sumner (Sting's son) and Sylvia Schwartz. Also released in 2006 was a live recording of a concert with the Metropole Orkest at the North Sea Jazz Festival, My Flame Burns Blue.

Costello was commissioned to write a chamber opera by the Danish Royal Opera, Copenhagen, on the subject of Hans Christian Andersen's infatuation with Swedish soprano Jenny Lind. Called The Secret Songs, it remained unfinished. In a performance in 2007 directed by Kasper Bech Holten at the Opera's studio theatre (Takelloftet), finished songs were interspersed with pieces from The Juliet Letters, featuring Danish soprano Sine Bundgaard as Lind.

In 2006, Costello performed with Fiona Apple in the Decades Rock TV special. Apple performed two Costello songs and Costello performed two Apple songs.

In 2007, Costello collaborated with the Argentinean/Uruguayan electro-tango band Bajofondo on the song "Fairly Right" from the album Mar Dulce. In Jenny Lewis' 2008 release, Acid Tongue, Costello provided vocals for the song "Carpetbaggers".

Momofuku (2008) was released on Lost Highway Records. The album was, at least initially, released exclusively on vinyl (with a code to download a digital copy). That summer, in support of the album, Costello toured with the Police on the final leg of their 2007/2008 Reunion Tour. Costello played a homecoming gig at the Liverpool Philharmonic Hall on 25 June 2006. and, that month, gave his first performance in Poland, appearing with The Imposters for the closing gig of the Malta theatre festival in Poznań.

In July 2008, Costello (as Declan McManus) was awarded an honorary degree of Doctor of Music from the University of Liverpool. Costello was featured on Fall Out Boy's album Folie à Deux (2008), providing vocals on the track "What a Catch, Donnie".

Costello cameod in Stephen Colbert's A Colbert Christmas: The Greatest Gift of All. In the program, he was eaten by a bear, but later saved by Santa Claus; he also duetted with Colbert. The special was first aired on 23 November 2008. Costello released Secret, Profane & Sugarcane, a collaboration with T Bone Burnett, on 9 June 2009. It was his first on the Starbucks Hear Music label and a return to country music in the manner of "Good Year for the Roses".

In May 2009, Costello made a surprise cameo appearance on-stage at the Beacon Theatre in New York as part of Spin̈al Tap's Unwigged and Unplugged show, singing their fictional 1965 hit "Gimme Some Money" with the band backing him up.

Costello portrayed The Shape on the record of Ghost Brothers of Darkland County, a Southern Gothic musical written by T. Bone Burnett, John Mellencamp and Stephen King. In February 2010, Costello appeared in the live cinecast of Garrison Keillor's Prairie Home Companion, singing some of his own songs, and participating in many of the show's other musical and acting performances. On 30 April 2011, he played "Pump it Up" with the Odds before the start of a Vancouver Canucks playoff game at Rogers Arena in Vancouver, British Columbia.

=== 2010–present ===
Costello released the album National Ransom in the autumn of 2010.

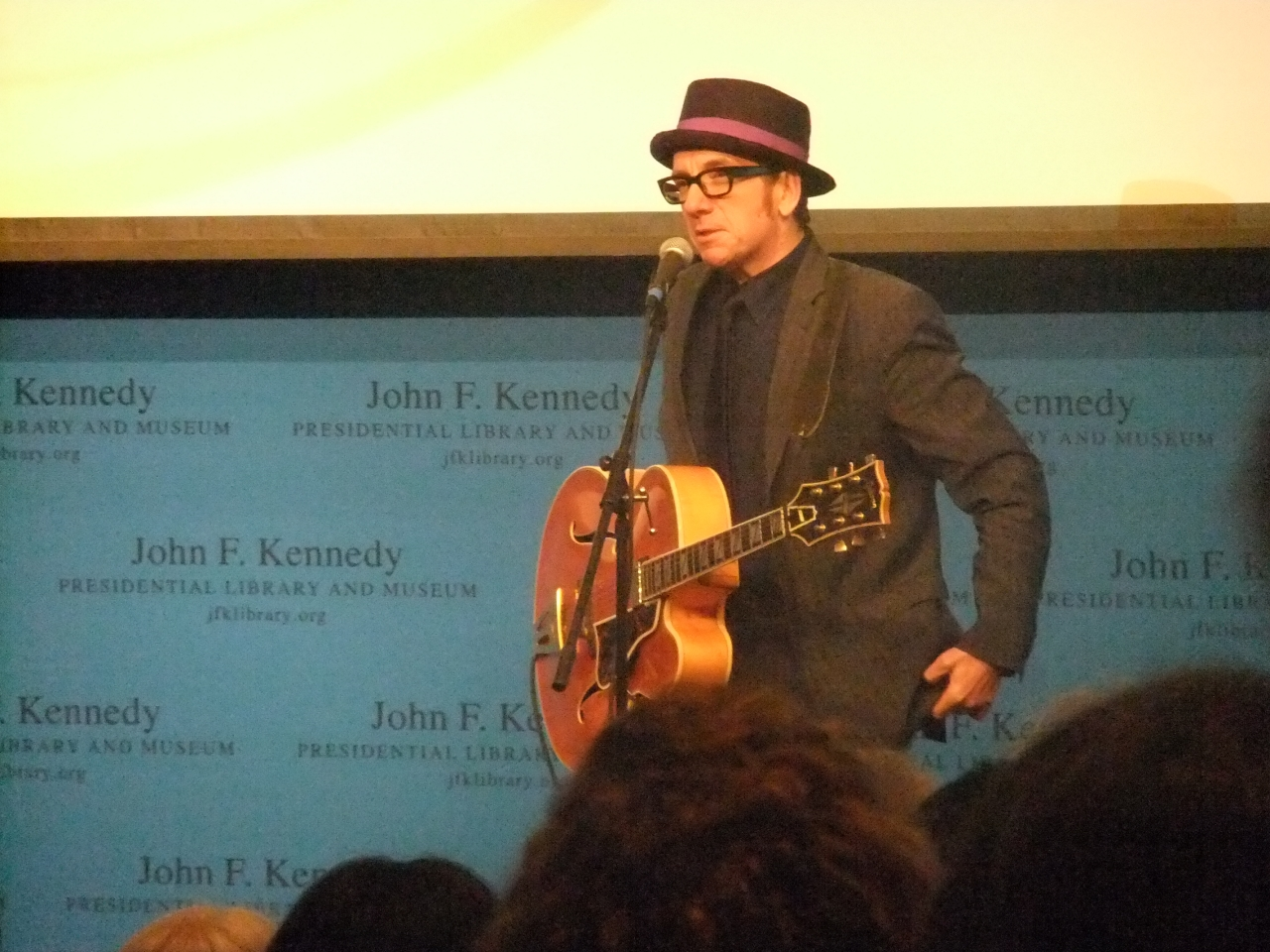
Costello performing in tribute to Chuck Berry and Leonard Cohen, who were the recipients of the first annual PEN Awards for songwriting excellence, at the JFK Presidential Library, in Boston, Massachusetts on 26 February 2012

On 26 February 2012, Costello paid tribute to Chuck Berry and Leonard Cohen, who were the recipients of the first annual PEN Awards for songwriting excellence, at the JFK Presidential Library, in Boston, Massachusetts. In September 2013 Costello released Wise Up Ghost, a collaboration with the Roots.

On 25 October 2013, Costello was awarded an Honorary Doctorate of Music from the New England Conservatory.

In 2012, he played ukulele, mandolin, guitar and added backing vocals on Diana Krall's 11th studio album, Glad Rag Doll (as "Howard Coward"). On 10 September 2013, he played during the Apple September 2013 Event after the introduction of iTunes Radio, iPhone 5C and 5S at Town Hall, at the Apple campus.

He sang on "Funny Little Tragedy" on Gov't Mule's album Shout! (2013). In March 2014, Costello recorded Lost on the River: The New Basement Tapes with Rhiannon Giddens, Taylor Goldsmith, Jim James, and Marcus Mumford. During the 2016 Detour, he performed with Larkin Poe.

Costello reunited with the Imposters to record Look Now (2018). The album features three songs co-written with Burt Bacharach, and one song co-written with Carole King. Costello wrote and produced a large majority of the album himself, with help from producer Sebastian Krys. Look Now won the Grammy Award for Best Traditional Pop Vocal Album at the 62nd Grammy Awards.

Costello was appointed Officer of the Order of the British Empire (OBE) in the 2019 Birthday Honours for services to music.

He appeared in Ken Burns's documentary Country Music discussing his love of the genre.

In 2021, Costello released Spanish Model, a remix of 1978's This Year's Model in Spanish. Singers from Spanish-speaking parts of the world, with help from Spanish-speaking songwriters, translated all 16 songs into Spanish, with the new vocals set to the original recording and instrumentation by the Attractions. The singers included Juanes, Jorge Drexler, Luis Fonsi, Francisca Valenzuela, Fuego, Draco Rosa, and Fito Páez.

In 2021, Costello appeared at the Royal Variety Performance playing two songs with the Imposters. He was introduced by the MC Alan Carr as a man who has achieved everything except appearing at the Royal Variety Performance. Between songs Costello informed the audience that he was the second McManus to appear. His father, Ross, appeared in the 1960s singing "If I Had a Hammer".

In January 2022, he performed on The Graham Norton Show. That same month he released the LP The Boy Named If, recorded with the Imposters. The Resurrection of Rust by a reformed Rusty followed later that year.

In 2022, Costello and Rusty bandmate Allan Mayes reunited to record The Resurrection of Rust. The EP contained songs that were typical of Rusty's shows in 1972, including the early version of "Ghost Train", then called "Maureen and Sam". (Note: Rusty's version of the song was co-written by Mayes and Costello, but by the time Costello recorded it as "Ghost Train", nothing remained of Mayes's contribution, so "Ghost Train" is credited to Costello alone.)

In April 2023, Costello collaborated with Slovenian band Joker Out on their single "New Wave". The compilation The Songs of Bacharach & Costello was also released at this time. In August 2023, he made a three-dates mini-tour together with Italian singer-songwriter Carmen Consoli, a project the two had originally planned in 2012 but that at the time had been shelved due to Consoli's pregnancy.

In November 2024, Costello and T Bone Burnett released a scripted comedy audio series on Audible, directed by Christopher Guest, as the Coward Brothers, characters the two created in the 1980s. The series features guest appearances by Harry Shearer as the radio host interviewing the two, along with Rhea Seehorn, Edward Hibbert, Stephen Root, and Kathreen Khavari. An accompanying soundtrack album was released via New West Records.

On March 5, 2026, Costello appeared at the 10th annual Love Rocks NYC benefit concert, performing a rendition of the Band's "The Weight" with Hozier, Mavis Staples, and Warren Haynes. The performance was acclaimed by American Songwriter.

== Writing ==
Since the early 1980s, Costello has written about music for publications including Hot Press, Details, Mojo, (Note: Costello wrote articles for Mojo in 1994, 1998 (three articles), 1999, 2002 (two articles), and 2014.) Musician, NME, Rolling Stone, and Vanity Fair. He has also written several articles about football (soccer), as an avid and knowledgeable fan, for the Times of London. Jim Windolf, who worked with Costello, said his "copy was clean, elegant, and ready to run". In 2000, Costello produced a list of "500 essential albums for a happy life" for Vanity Fair.

Costello has written liner notes for releases by artists including Gram Parsons, the Fairfield Four, Dusty Springfield, Booker T. & the M.G.'s, Burt Bacharach, and Bill Frisell. He has written forewords to books by Geoff Emerick, Loretta Lynn, and Wanda Jackson.

In 1993, Costello began reissuing his catalogue of albums from 1977 through 1986, on Rykodisc, and wrote detailed liner notes for each reissued album. Reviewers praised these liner notes as frank and charming. In 2001, he began a second round of reissues, this time of his catalogue from 1977 through 1996, on Rhino Entertainment, and wrote even more detailed liner notes. Goldmine said the Rhino liner notes brought "a wealth of insight into the songs and the creative process itself" and that "liner notes simply don't get any better than this". Pitchfork called them "truly fascinating". Several journalists noted that, at a total of 60,000 words, the Rhino liner notes amounted to a serialised memoir. In 2012, Slate magazine published a book review of the Rhino liner notes in which it called them "one of the best rock-star memoirs of the last decade".

In 2015, Costello published Unfaithful Music & Disappearing Ink, a memoir that had little overlap with his reissue liner notes. In the book, he recounted his life in music and traced parallels between his own experiences and those of his father and grandfather, both of whom were musicians. The book received positive reviews from prominent publications, although some noted that the writing quality was uneven and it might have been improved by being shorter, having a narrower more thematic focus, or both. Billboard criticised its nonlinear structure, its relative lack of emphasis on Costello's pop-star period, and its lack of details about his romantic relationships. The book reached number seven on the New York Times Best Seller list. It was shortlisted for the Penderyn Music Book Prize, a British award for excellence in writing about music. The audiobook, narrated by Costello, was nominated for a Grammy.

== Acting and television presenting ==
Costello has played himself or semi-fictionalised versions of himself in movies and television shows, including Austin Powers: The Spy Who Shagged Me (1999), The Simpsons (2002), Frasier (2003), Two and a Half Men (2004), 30 Rock (2009), Treme (2010), and Sesame Street (2011). He has also played more character-based roles, such as the title character's eccentric brother in screenwriter Alan Bleasdale's television series Scully (1984), an inept magician in Bleasdale's movie No Surrender (1985), a teacher at an impoverished school in the movie Prison Song (2001), and the title character's father in the children's animated series The Adventures of Pete the Cat (2017). In 1995, he appeared as a guest pundit on the British football commentary television show Football Italia.

In 2003, Costello substituted for an ailing David Letterman as the host of Late Show with David Letterman, making him the only musical guest of the show to have served as guest host. Costello's performance on that show led to interest in developing a music-orientated talk show with him as the host, which came to fruition a few years later.

In 2008, Costello began production on Spectacle: Elvis Costello with..., a show on which he interviewed and performed songs with other musicians. The series was executive-produced by Elton John, who also appeared as a guest, and other guests included Tony Bennett, Bruce Springsteen, Smokey Robinson, Bono and the Edge of U2, opera singer Renée Fleming, and former president (and accomplished saxophonist) Bill Clinton. It ran for 20 episodes over two seasons from 2008 through 2010, and aired on Sundance Channel in the US, CTV in Canada, and Channel 4 in the UK. The show was received favourably in the US, with reviewers praising Costello's ability to get his guests to reveal insights into their creative processes and calling him a "deeply knowledgeable, erudite and witty host". In Canada, the show won a Gemini Award for Best Talk Series. In Britain, it was aired in an overnight time slot and largely ignored. In 2009, Costello appeared live with Bruce Springsteen and the E Street Band at Madison Square Garden and performed the Jackie Wilson song "(Your Love Keeps Lifting Me) Higher and Higher".

Costello appeared on the last episode of The Late Show With Stephen Colbert, performing his song "Jump Up". He joined Paul McCartney, Jon Batiste and Colbert for a performance of the Beatles's "Hello, Goodbye".

== Public image and controversies ==
Costello revealed little about his background and gave few interviews in the first five years of his career, so the few widely published interviews he gave played a large role in forming his early public image. In a widely quoted August 1977 interview with Nick Kent, Costello said the only things that mattered to him were "revenge and guilt". This phrase would be associated with him throughout his career.

=== 1977 Saturday Night Live appearance ===
On 17 December 1977, Costello and the Attractions appeared on Saturday Night Live as last-minute replacements for the Sex Pistols. One of the songs Costello was scheduled to perform, at the request of his record company, was "Less Than Zero", a song Costello wrote in reaction to seeing British fascist Oswald Mosley being treated with what Costello felt was undeserved deference during an interview on British television. Costello did not want to play the song because he thought the subject was too obscure for American audiences and the song was too low-key to make a strong impression. Instead, he wanted to play the then-unrecorded song, "Radio Radio". During the live broadcast, Costello played a few bars of "Less Than Zero" and then told the Attractions to play "Radio Radio", which they played in its entirety. This angered the show's producer, Lorne Michaels, because Michaels was not prepared for the change and because "Radio Radio" had not been cleared by NBC's censors. (Note: Many sources assert without evidence that Lorne Michaels or others associated with Saturday Night Live, rather than Costello's record company, had told Costello not to play "Radio Radio", or that the supposedly anti-corporate nature of the song's lyrics was the reason he was told not to play it, or both. This is not supported by Costello's account, nor by Michaels' account, nor the accounts of others directly involved with the show.)

When asked about the incident on NBC's The Tomorrow Show three years later, Costello said he was told he would never appear on American television again. He appeared as musical guest on Saturday Night Live again in 1989 and 1991. For its 25th anniversary Costello was invited to the programme, where he re-enacted his abrupt song-switch: This time, however, he interrupted the Beastie Boys's "Sabotage", and they acted as his backing group for "Radio Radio".

=== 1979 Columbus incident ===
In March 1979, during a drunken argument with Bonnie Bramlett and other members of the Stephen Stills band, at a Holiday Inn bar in Columbus, Ohio, Costello referred to Ray Charles as a "blind, ignorant nigger" and made similar comments about James Brown. At a New York City press conference a few days later, Costello said he had been drunk and had been attempting to be obnoxious to bring the conversation to a swift conclusion, not anticipating that Bramlett would bring his comments to the press. According to Costello, "It became necessary for me to outrage these people with about the most obnoxious and offensive remarks that I could muster".

In his liner notes for the expanded version of Get Happy!! Costello writes that some time after the incident he had declined an offer to meet Charles out of guilt and embarrassment, although Charles himself had forgiven Costello, saying "Drunken talk isn't meant to be printed in the paper". Costello worked extensively in Britain's Rock Against Racism campaign both before and after the incident. In an interview with Questlove (drummer for the Roots, with whom Costello collaborated in 2013), he stated: "It's upsetting because I can't explain how I even got to think you could be funny about something like that" and further elaborating with, "I'm sorry. You know? It's about time I said it out loud."

=== 2010 cancelled Tel Aviv concerts ===
In early 2010, Costello was invited to play his first concert in Israel, on 30 June of that year, at the Caesarea Amphitheater north of Tel Aviv. Due to high demand for tickets, a second concert was added for 1 July. At first, Costello seemed resolved to resist political pressure on artists to refrain from performing in Israel due to the country's controversial treatment of Palestinians. In early May, Costello told Israel's largest daily newspaper, Yedioth Ahronoth, "As soon as you play you are going to get criticised". Costello told the newspaper he did not agree with organisations that "think that they need to boycott Israel to pressure it", saying he thought "culture is the only way in which humanity shares experiences, and that is why I need to come and perform here".

Costello announced on his website two weeks later that he had cancelled the concerts because of what he called the "grave and complex" sensitivities of the Israeli–Palestinian conflict. He told The Jerusalem Post his decision was part of a "30-year conundrum" that he had been dealing with regarding playing in Israel. He also told the Post that he had not been threatened or coerced, but that he "woke up one day and realised [he] couldn't go on with the shows". The promoters of the concerts expressed shock. Israeli Culture Minister Limor Livnat, a member of the right-wing Likud Party who opposed the Oslo accords and withdrawal from the occupied territories, denounced the decision. The organisation Palestinian Campaign for the Academic and Cultural Boycott of Israel praised it.

== Personal life ==
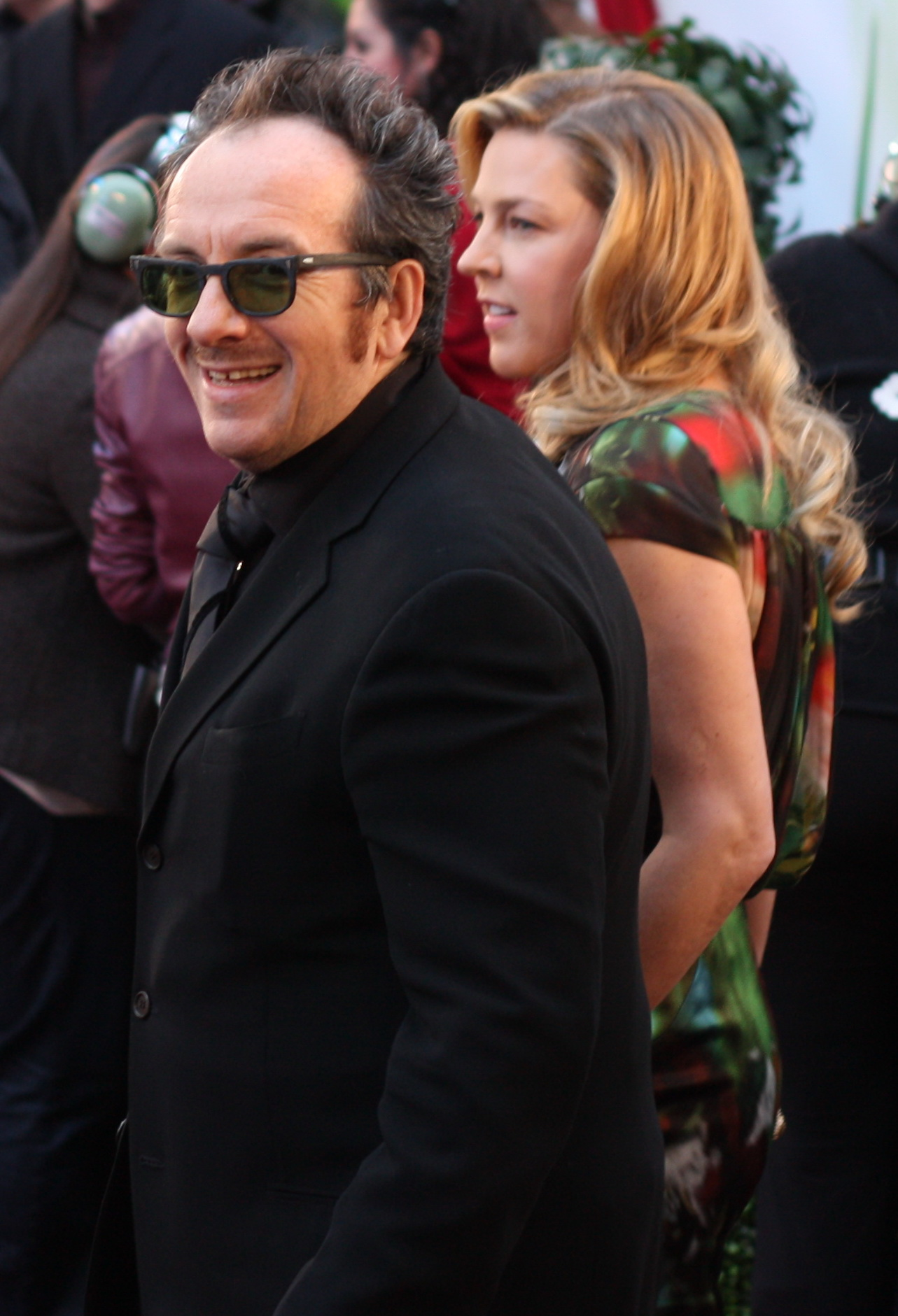
Costello and Diana Krall in 2009

Costello has no full siblings. He has four half-brothers from his father's second marriage, all of whom are musicians.

In November 1974, Costello married Mary Burgoyne. Costello has said he had hoped to marry Burgoyne since he was 14 years old and they were at school together in London, although they did not begin dating until four years later, when Costello moved back to London after living with his mother in Liverpool for two and a half years. They have one child, Matthew MacManus, born in early 1975. Costello's rapid rise to fame put a strain on their marriage almost immediately. The couple separated in early 1978 but reconciled the following year. They separated permanently in mid-1984 and finalised their divorce in 1988. Costello has said that his inability to remain faithful in his first marriage, and the emotional turmoil it caused him, has been a major inspiration for his songs.

In early 1985, Costello began a romantic relationship with Cait O'Riordan, bassist for the Pogues, whom he met in October 1984 while their respective bands were on tour together. In May 1986, they exchanged wedding rings and thereafter presented themselves, and were regarded as husband and wife. They were never legally married and had no children. In September 2002, Costello ended the relationship. Since their split, both Costello and O'Riordan have described the union as unhappy.

In December 2003, Costello married the singer and pianist Diana Krall, whom he met at the Grammy Awards ceremony the year before. They have twin sons, born in December 2006.

On Desert Island Discs, he choose "I've Got You Under My Skin" covered by Frank Sinatra, "At Last" covered by Ross MacManus, Mozart's aria " Non so più cosa son", "You've Really Got A Hold On Me", covered by the Beatles, Schubert's Sonata in B♭ major, D. 960, Henry Purcell's "Dido's Lament" and Billy Strayhorn's "Blood Count", played by Duke Ellington. His first choice was Beethoven's String Quartet No. 16. His book choice was The Selected Works of James Thurber. In conversation with the New York Public Library, he named his three favorite books: F. Scott Fitzgerald's The Pat Hobby Stories, Spike Milligan's Adolf Hitler: My Part in His Downfall and Luis Buñuel's My Last Sigh, describing them as "Cautionary tales".

=== Health ===
In July 2018, Costello announced that he had been successfully treated for a cancerous growth six weeks earlier, but needed to cancel the remaining six dates of his European tour to continue recovering from the surgery. Costello said he had underestimated how much time he would need to recover. He resumed performing in September 2018.

=== Humanitarian causes ===
In 2017, Costello helped establish the Musician Treatment Foundation as a member of its board of directors. The foundation, which is based in Austin, Texas, helps under- and uninsured professional musicians receive free orthopaedic care for upper limb injuries. He performed concerts for the foundation's benefit in October 2017 and December 2022.

Costello sits on the advisory board of the board of directors of the Jazz Foundation of America, which provides emergency financial support and other services to working and retired musicians.

=== Pescatarianism ===
Costello was moved to reject meat after seeing the documentary The Animals Film (1982), which influenced his song "Pills and Soap". He has been a practicing pescatarian ever since. In January 2013, Costello teamed up with Paul McCartney to create an advertisement campaign backing vegetarian cuisine produced by Linda McCartney Foods.

== Legacy ==
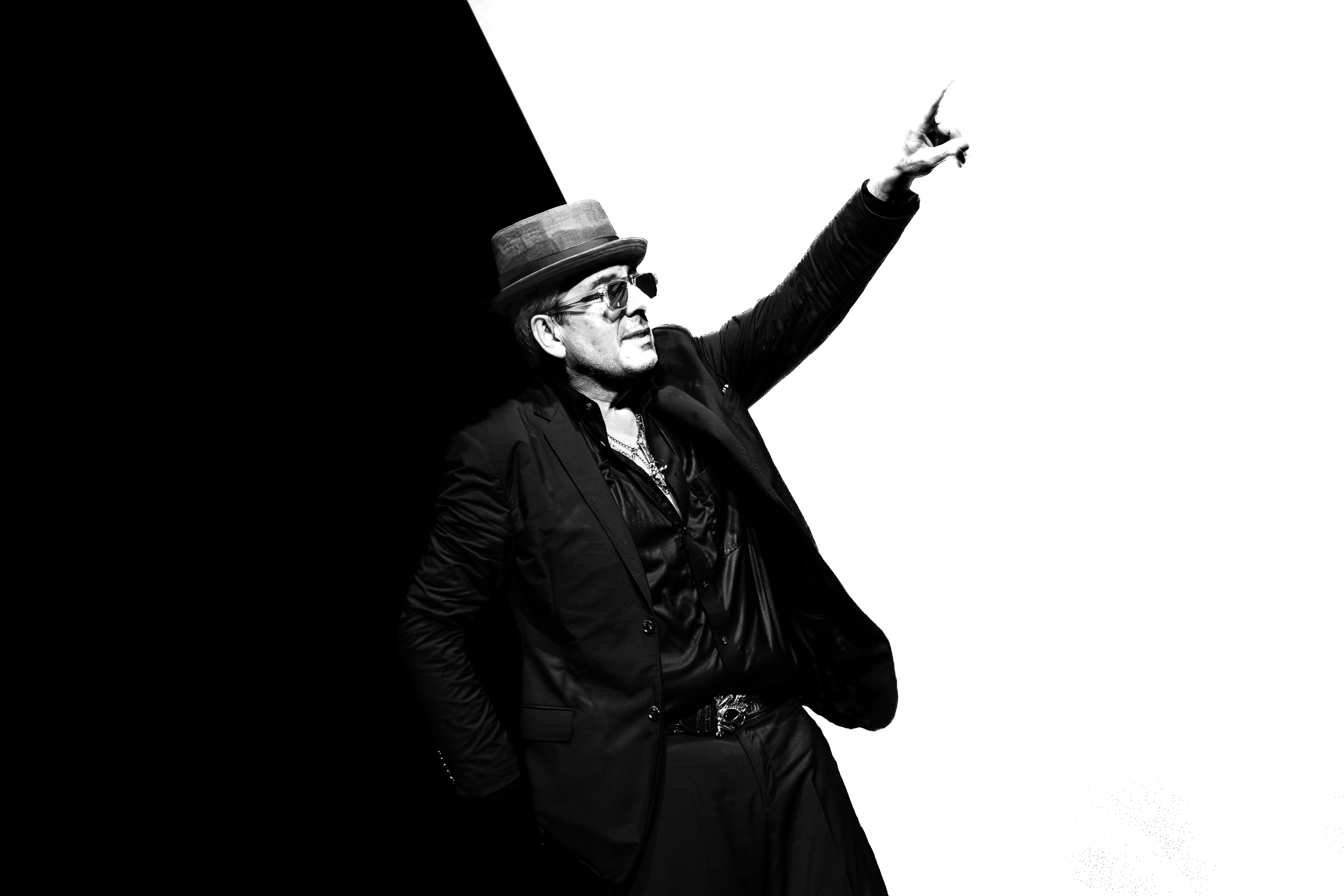
Elvis Costello performing in Dublin in 2024

Stephen Thomas Erlewine of AllMusic called Costello the "most evocative, innovative, and gifted songwriter since Bob Dylan, with songs that offer highly personal takes on love and politics". In 2015, Rolling Stone ranked him 24th on their list of the greatest songwriters of all time, noting his "almost unparalleled versatility". When he was inducted into the Songwriters Hall of Fame in 2016, the induction announcement said the impact of Costello's songs "far out-distanced their commercial performance".

Costello's My Aim Is True is widely considered one of the best debut albums in rock history, and influential on rock and punk music.

Although Costello never applied the term "new wave" to his music, his early records helped defined the genre. AllMusic said, "Costello's early albums changed the face of pop music by harnessing punk's energy to a leaner, more incisive aesthetic that included pop hooks, virtually inventing new wave in the process". In their 2013 list of greatest albums of all time, NME described This Year's Model as "defining the British new wave". In their 2009 list of greatest albums of all time, Rolling Stone said "the keyboard-driven sound of 'Accidents Will Happen' helped define new wave".

Musical artists with little connection to new wave have also acknowledged influence by and appreciation of Costello. George Harrison said in 1979: "Elvis Costello is very good – very good melodies, good chord changes. I'm pleased about his success." Bruce Springsteen said Costello's comments criticising Springsteen's early songs as excessively romantic led him to write darker songs for Darkness on the Edge of Town (1978). Radiohead 's Thom Yorke called Blood & Chocolate "the album that made me change the way I thought about recording and writing music [and] lyrics". Liz Phair, in her appreciation of Costello for Rolling Stone's 100 Greatest Artists of All Time, wrote: "I'd pay a great amount of money to audit a course taught by him." Suzanne Vega called Costello one of the "melodic geniuses" whose music she uses to "stretch my sense of melody".

Prominent artists in other fields have taken inspiration from Costello. Peter Blake featured Costello prominently in his 2012 reworking of his cover for the Beatles' Sgt. Pepper's Lonely Hearts Club Band. Blake said he included people he admired and who had contributed to British culture since he created the original work. Filmmaker Judd Apatow has called Costello "a gigantic inspiration to me" and has said that he and other comedians are "fanatical" about Costello's music because of the "spirit of standing up for what you believe in and the humor" in it. Satirist and television host Stephen Colbert has described Costello as "probably my favourite rock artist" and said he sees parallels between his own humour and Costello's "wry, sardonic" songs. Novelist Bret Easton Ellis titled his 1985 novel Less Than Zero after a Costello song and its 2010 sequel Imperial Bedrooms after a Costello album. Ellis has said Costello was once his "idol". The title of Nick Hornby's 1995 novel High Fidelity is derived from Costello's 1980 song of the same name. Alan Moore and Dave Gibbons pay homage to Costello in Watchmen. The epigraph for the second issue is from Costello's "The Comedians": "I should be drinking a toast to absent friends/ Instead of these comedians."

== Awards and honours ==
=== Entertainment industry awards ===
United States:

- ASCAP Founders Award (2003)
- Grammy Award, Best Pop Collaboration with Vocals, "I Still Have That Other Girl" (1998)
- Grammy Award, Best Traditional Pop Vocal Album, Look Now (2019)
- Grammy Hall of Fame, My Aim Is True (2007)
- MTV Video Music Award, Best Male Video, "Veronica" (1989)
- Rock and Roll Hall of Fame, with the Attractions (2003)
- Songwriters Hall of Fame (2016)

United Kingdom:

- BAFTA, Best Original Television Music, G.B.H. (1992)
- Ivor Novello Award, Outstanding Contemporary Song Collection (1995)
- Ivor Novello Award, PRS Outstanding Contribution to British Music Award (1997)

Netherlands:

- Edison Award, Pop category, My Aim Is True (1978)
- Edison Award, singer-songwriter, Spike (1989)
- Edison Award, Extra/special production, innovative, The Juliet Letters (1993)
- Edison Award, International singer, Painted from Memory (1999)

Canada:

- Gemini Award, Best Talk Series, Spectacle: Elvis Costello with... (2010)

=== Critics' best-of lists and music press awards ===
Best of year:

- NME Awards Best Songwriter (1978)
- NME Awards Best Songwriter (1983)
- NME Awards Best Album, Punch the Clock (1983)
- The Village Voice Pazz & Jop critics' poll, number 1 album of the year, This Years Model (1978)
- The Village Voice Pazz & Jop critics' poll, number 1 album of the year, Imperial Bedroom (1982)

Best of all time:

- Five albums on NME's 500 Greatest Albums of All Time (2013):
  - This Year's Model (number 256)
  - My Aim is True (number 281)
  - Imperial Bedroom (number 316)
  - Punch the Clock (number 345)
  - Blood and Chocolate (number 483)
- Four albums on Rolling Stone's 500 Greatest Albums of All Time (2009):
  - This Year's Model (number 98)
  - Imperial Bedroom (number 166)
  - My Aim Is True (number 168)
  - Armed Forces (number 475)
- Number 24 on Rolling Stone's 100 Greatest Songwriters of All Time (2015)
- Number 80 on Rolling Stone's 100 Greatest Artists of All Time (2010)

=== Honorary degrees ===
- Doctor of Music, University of Liverpool (2008)
- Doctor of Music, New England Conservatory of Music (2013)

== Discography ==
=== Albums as solo artist and bandleader ===
- My Aim Is True (1977)
- This Year's Model (1978)
- Armed Forces (1979)
- Get Happy!! (1980)
- Trust (1981)
- Almost Blue (1981)
- Imperial Bedroom (1982)
- Punch the Clock (1983)
- Goodbye Cruel World (1984)
- King of America (1986)
- Blood & Chocolate (1986)
- Spike (1989)
- Mighty Like a Rose (1991)
- Brutal Youth (1994)
- Kojak Variety (1995)
- All This Useless Beauty (1996)
- When I Was Cruel (2002)
- North (2003)
- The Delivery Man (2004)
- Momofuku (2008)
- Secret, Profane & Sugarcane (2009)
- National Ransom (2010)
- Look Now (2018)
- Hey Clockface (2020)
- The Boy Named If (2022)

=== Collaborative albums ===
- The Juliet Letters, with the Brodsky Quartet (1993)
- Painted from Memory, with Burt Bacharach (1998)
- For the Stars, with Anne Sofie von Otter (2001)
- Piano Jazz, with Marian McPartland (2005)
- My Flame Burns Blue, with the Metropole Orkest (2006)
- The River in Reverse, with Allen Toussaint (2006)
- Wise Up Ghost, with the Roots (2013)
- Lost on the River, as member of The New Basement Tapes (2014)
- The Resurrection of Rust, with Allan Mayes (2022)
- The Coward Brothers, with T Bone Burnett (2024)

=== Composer, soundtracks and scores ===
- G.B.H., with Richard Harvey (1991)
- Jake's Progress, with Richard Harvey (1995)
- Il Sogno (2004)

=== Producer for others ===
- The Specials – Specials (1979)
- East Side Story – Squeeze (1981, with Roger Béchirian)
- "Free Nelson Mandela" – the Special A.K.A (1984)
- Rum Sodomy & the Lash – the Pogues (1985)

== Filmography ==
=== As actor ===
- 1979 film debut as "The Earl of Manchester" in Americathon. Costello and the Attractions mime the song "Crawling to the U.S.A." in the film, which also appears on its soundtrack album.
- 1984 as "Henry Scully" in the UK TV series, Scully
- 1984 as "Stone Deaf A&R Man" in The Bullshitters, a movie made by members of the comedy troupe The Comic Strip, first aired on Channel 4
- 1985 as inept magician "Rosco de Ville" in the Alan Bleasdale film, No Surrender
- 1987 as "Hives the Butler" in the Alex Cox film, Straight to Hell, starring Joe Strummer and Courtney Love. Costello's "Big Nothing" (AKA "Town Called Big Nothing") appears in the film and on its soundtrack album.
- 1994 as himself on The Larry Sanders Show in the episode "People's Choice"
- 1996 as himself on The Larry Sanders Show in the episode "Everybody Loves Larry"
- 1997 as a barman in Spice World
- 1999 as himself in Austin Powers: The Spy Who Shagged Me, performing Burt Bacharach's "I'll Never Fall In Love Again" (with Bacharach), which also appears on its soundtrack album.
- 1999 as a younger version of himself in 200 Cigarettes
- 2000 as himself, filling his car with petrol in the full-length feature Sans plomb, whose soundtrack includes several of his songs
- 2001 as himself performing "Fly Me to the Moon" on the series finale of 3rd Rock from the Sun
- 2002 as himself on the episode "How I Spent My Strummer Vacation" of The Simpsons
- 2003 as Ben on Frasier, in the season 10 episode "Farewell Nervosa"
- 2003 as himself in I Love Your Work
- 2004 as himself in the UK TV Dead Ringers New Year Special, apparently and reportedly having serendipitously entered a filming venue.
- 2004 as himself in Two and a Half Men – Season 2, Episode 1
- 2004 as himself in De-Lovely
- 2006 as himself in Delirious
- 2006 as himself in Before the Music Dies
- 2006 as himself in Putting the River in Reverse
- 2006 as himself in Talladega Nights: The Ballad of Ricky Bobby
- 2008 as himself in A Colbert Christmas: The Greatest Gift of All!
- 2009 as himself on the 30 Rock episode "Kidney Now!"
- 2010 as himself on Treme
- 2017 as himself in Ex Libris – The New York Public Library
- 2017–2019 as Pete's Dad (voice) in Pete the Cat (Season 1)

=== As part of soundtracks ===
- 1983, "Party Party" appears in the film of the same name and on its soundtrack album.
- 1991, "Days" (a cover of the Kinks song) appears in the film Until the End of the World and on its soundtrack album.
- 1996, "God Give Me Strength", a collaboration with Burt Bacharach, appears in the film Grace of My Heart and on its soundtrack album. Nominated for Satellite Award for Best Original Song.
- 1998, "My Mood Swings" appears in the film The Big Lebowski and on its soundtrack album.
- 1998, "I Throw My Toys Around", a collaboration with No Doubt, appears in the film The Rugrats Movie and on its soundtrack album.
- 1999, "She" (a cover of the Charles Aznavour song) appears in the film Notting Hill and on its soundtrack album. The song peaked at No. 19 on the UK singles chart.
- 2003, "The Scarlet Tide", written by Costello and T Bone Burnett and performed by Alison Krauss, appears in the film Cold Mountain and on its soundtrack album. Nominated for Academy Award for Best Original Song and Grammy Award for Best Song Written for Visual Media.

=== Interviewee ===
- 2019. Interviewed in Ken Burns's Country Music discussing his love of the genre.

== Bibliography ==
- 1980: A Singing Dictionary sheet music
- 1983: Costello, Elvis (1983). Everyday I Write the Song. Plangent Visions Music. ISBN 978-0-7119-1842-9. sheet music
- 2016: Costello, Elvis (2016). Unfaithful Music & Disappearing Ink. New York: Blue Rider Press. ISBN 978-0-399-18576-2. memoir
