= Baby I Don't Care (album) =

Compilation album by Transvision Vamp
- Released: 2002
- Recorded: 1988–1991
- Genre: Pop rock
- Length: 79:05
- Label: Spectrum Music
- Producers: Duncan Bridgeman, Zeus B. Held

Transvision Vamp chronology
Kiss Their Sons (1998)	Baby I Don't Care (2002)

Baby I Don't Care is a budget compilation album by the English pop rock band Transvision Vamp comprising all their singles, selected album tracks and extended versions. It was released on CD in 2002 on the Spectrum Music label.

The artwork utilises a repeated picture of Wendy James in a pop-art style and the four-page booklet contains an essay by Daryl Easlea of Record Collector magazine.

== Critical reception ==
Professional ratings
Review scores
Source	Rating
AllMusic	4/5 stars

Heather Phares of AllMusic wrote that the album "puts most of its focus on tracks from Velveteen" and the inclusion of songs from Little Magnets Versus the Bubble of Babble "reveal that Transvision Vamp's experiments with dance and hip-hop beats didn't sound at all disastrous, even though that was the effect that they had on the band" and the selected remixes actually "pushes the band's sound further in that direction". Phares concluded it is "a good retrospective of Transvision Vamp's entertaining, if slight, late-'80s/early-'90s alterna-pop".

== Track listing ==
All tracks by Nick Christian Sayer except where noted

1. "I Want Your Love" – 3:29
2. "Baby I Don't Care" – 4:37
3. "Tell That Girl to Shut Up" (Holly Beth Vincent) – 3:06
4. "Revolution Baby" – 4:53
5. "Sister Moon" – 4:23
6. "(I Just Wanna) B with U" (Wendy James, Sayer) – 4:21
7. "The Only One" – 4:19
8. "Landslide of Love" – 3:48
9. "If Looks Could Kill" – 4:10
10. "Kiss Their Sons" – 4:16
11. "Every Little Thing" – 3:59
12. "Bad Valentine" – 3:45
13. "Velveteen" – 9:51
14. "Born to Be Sold" – 3:44
15. "Revolution Baby" (Electra-glide Mix) – 6:01
16. "Tell That Girl to Shut Up" (Knuckle Duster Mix) (Vincent) – 4:44
17. "Baby I Don't Care" (Abigail's Party Mix) – 5:45

Notes

- "(I Just Wanna) B with U" is incorrectly titled "(I Just Wanna) Be with You".
- Daryl Easlea wrongly states that the title of Transvision Vamp's third album was The Little Magnets Versus the Bubble of Babble. It was simply Little Magnets Versus the Bubble of Babble.

== Personnel ==
- Wendy James – vocals
- Nick Christian Sayer – guitar
- Dave Parsons – bass
- Tex Axile – keyboards and drums
- Pol Burton – drums
