= Anthony Doughty =

English musician (born 1963)

Anthony "Tex" Doughty (born 30 July 1963 in Crawley, Sussex, England) is an English rock musician. He was a member of a number of punk bands in the late 1970s, including Peroxide Romance, The Outpatients and The Moors Murderers. In 1986, he and Dave Parsons joined fellow musicians Wendy James and Nick Sayer to form Transvision Vamp in which he adopted the pseudonym Tex Axile (a pun on tax exile). After they split up, Doughty joined a band called Max with Matthew Ashman, Kevin Mooney, John Reynolds and John Keogh in which he played keyboards. They released a Trevor Horn-produced album, Silence Running in 1992.

Keogh died soon after the release, and Ashman followed a couple of years later. Doughty continues to release solo albums on his own record label.

Doughty also has acted, and roles included in I Hired a Contract Killer and Hail the New Puritan.

== Discography ==
=== With Transvision Vamp ===
- Pop Art (1988)
- Velveteen (1989)
- Little Magnets Versus the Bubble of Babble (1991)

=== Singles ===
- "Revolution Baby" (1987)
- "Tell That Girl to Shut Up" (1988) (UK No. 45, US No. 87, Australia #44)
- "I Want Your Love" (1988) (UK No. 5, Australia No. 7, South Africa #1)
- "Revolution Baby" (re-issue) (1988) (UK No. 30, AUS #24)
- "Sister Moon" (1988) (UK No. 41, Australia #95)
- "Baby I Don't Care" (1989) (UK No. 3, AUS #3)
- "The Only One" (1989) (UK No. 15, Australia #30)
- "Landslide of Love" (1989) (UK No. 14, Australia #70)
- "Born to Be Sold" (1989) (UK No. 22, Australia #108)
- "Child of the Age" (1989) Exclusive track on free Record Mirror 7" single.
- "(I Just Wanna) B with U" (1991) (UK No. 30, Australia #16)
- "If Looks Could Kill" (1991) (UK No. 41, Australia #56)

=== Compilations ===
- The Complete 12"ers Collection Vol. 1 (1990, MCA Records)
- Mixes (1992, MCA Records)
- Kiss Their Sons (1998, Universal Records)
- Baby I Don't Care (2002, Spectrum Music)
