= Racine (disambiguation) =

Jean Racine (1639–1699) was a French dramatist.

Racine may also refer to:

== Music ==
- Racine (band), a band fronted by Wendy James
- Racine (album), a 1992 album by Sass Jordan
- Rasin or racine, Haitian roots music
- Racine carrée, an album by Stromae
- Racine 2, an album by Racine

== Places ==
=== United States ===
- Racine, Minnesota, a small city in Mower County
- Racine, Missouri, an unincorporated community
- Racine, Ohio, a village
- Racine, West Virginia, a census-designated place
- Racine, Wisconsin, a city (pop. 78k)
- Racine County, Wisconsin

=== Elsewhere ===
- Racine Nunatak, Antarctica, a protrusion from a glacier, near Berry Peaks
- Racine, Quebec, Canada, a municipality
- Racine (Casablanca), Morocco, a quartier

== Rail stations in the United States ==
- Racine Avenue station, Chicago, on the Metra Electric line
- Racine station (CTA Blue Line), a current station
- Racine station (CTA Green Line), a defunct station
- Racine Depot (1902–1980), Wisconsin

== Other uses ==
- Mont Racine, a peak in the Jura Mountains
- Racine Belles, a former team in the All-American Girls Professional Baseball League
- Racine Danish Kringles, a bakery
- Racine Dominican Sisters, a Catholic religious institute for women
- Racine stages, commonly used to score seizure severity in animal models of epilepsy
- Racine Zoo
- USS Racine (LST-1191)

== People with the surname ==
- Albert Racine (1907–1984), American Blackfoot artist
- Antoine Racine (1822-1893), Canadian Roman Catholic priest
- Bruce Racine (born 1966), Canadian former professional hockey goaltender
- Bruno Racine (born 1951), French administrator and writer
- Dominique Racine (1828-1888), Canadian Roman Catholic priest
- Doug Racine (born 1952), former Vermont State Senator
- Horace Racine (1905-1994), Canadian politician
- Jean-François Racine (born 1982), ice hockey goaltender
- Jean-Paul Racine (1928–1988), Canadian politician
- Jonathan Racine (born 1993), Canadian professional ice hockey player
- Karl Racine (born 1962), attorney general of the District of Columbia
- Louis Racine (1692–1763), French poet, the son of Jean Racine
- René Racine (born 1939), Québécois Canadian astronomer
- Serge Racine (born 1951), Haitian football defender
- Yves Racine (born 1969), Canadian former professional ice hockey player

== People with the first name ==
- Racine Coly (born 1995), Senegalese professional footballer

== See also ==
- Jean Racine (disambiguation)
- Racines (disambiguation)
