= Sister Moon (Transvision Vamp song) =

Single by Transvision Vamp

from the album Pop Art
- B-side: "Oh Yeah"; "Walk On By"
- Released: 7 November 1988 (UK); 1 May 1989 (Australia)
- Recorded: 1988
- Genre: Pop rock
- Length: 3:58
- Label: MCA; TVV 5
- Songwriter: Nick Christian Sayer
- Producer: Duncan Bridgeman

Transvision Vamp singles chronology
"Revolution Baby" (1988)	"Sister Moon" (1988)	"Baby I Don't Care" (1989)

Official audio
- "Sister Moon" on YouTube

"Sister Moon" is a song by the English pop rock band Transvision Vamp, released on 7 November 1988 by MCA Records as the fifth and final single from their debut studio album Pop Art. It was a minor hit on the UK singles chart in 1988, peaking at No. 41.

In Australia, "Sister Moon" was released on 1 May 1989 as the fourth and final single from the album, following "Tell That Girl to Shut Up".

== Critical reception ==
Jerry Smith of the British magazine Music Week reviewed the single positively. He called "Sister Moon" a "fine pop song", "downbeat ballad with acoustic backing and breathy vocals" and expressed assurance that single will grant "high exposure to give them yet more chart action."

== Track listing ==
7" vinyl (TVV 5 / TVVP 5)

1. "Sister Moon" (7" version) – 3:58
2. "Oh Yeah" (Anthony Doughty, Dave Parsons) - 2:52
3. "Walk On By" (Pol Burton) – 3:23
- A limited edition 7" picture disc was also released (TVVP 5).

12" vinyl (TVVT 5)

1. "Sister Moon" (Groove On) – 6:08
2. "Walk On By" – 3:23
3. "Sex Kick" (Ciao Portobello) – 7:19
4. "Oh Yeah" – 2:52

CD single (DTVV 5)

1. "Sister Moon" (7" version) – 3:58
2. "Oh Yeah" – 2:52
3. "Walk On By" – 3:23
4. "Sex Kick" (Ciao Portobello) – 7:19

== Charts ==
Chart (1988–89)	Peak position
Australia (ARIA)	95
UK (Official Charts Company)	41
