= I Came Here to Blow Minds =

2010 studio album by Wendy James

Studio album by Wendy James
- Released: 19 October 2010 (digital); 29 March 2011
- Genre: Indie rock; garage rock; alternative rock
- Length: 45:54
- Label: Cobraside Distribution Inc.
- Producer: Wendy James

Wendy James chronology
Now Ain't the Time for Your Tears (1993)	I Came Here to Blow Minds (2010)	The Price of the Ticket (2016)

I Came Here to Blow Minds is the second solo album by former Transvision Vamp and Racine lead singer Wendy James. It was originally released in October 2010 as a digital album, but saw a physical release in March 2011.

The album became James' first solo album release in seventeen years, after 1993's Now Ain't the Time for Your Tears, although she had fronted the indie rock band Racine from 2004 to 2008, during which time they released the albums: Number One and Racine 2.

The track "You Tell Me" was released as a teaser in May 2009, more than a year before the album's release.

== Track listing ==
1. "The Moon Dead in the River" – 4:57
2. "Where Have You Been, So Long?" – 4:27
3. "Don't Shoot – I Ain't Dillinger" – 4:41
4. "Municipal Blues" – 3:26
5. "New Wave Flowered Up Main Street Acid Baby" – 2:44
6. "Speedball" – 3:59
7. "No Dice" – 3:22
8. "You Tell Me" – 3:46
9. "King Hoodlum" – 3:26
10. "One Evening, in a Small Café..." – 3:45
11. "These Beggar Memories" – 4:21
12. "You're a Fucking Mess, But You Sure Is Pretty" – 2:19
13. "I Came Here to Blow Minds" – 3:21

== Personnel ==
- Wendy James – lead vocals, guitar, piano, composer, producer
- Wade Keighran – bass, percussion
- Hadrien Grange – drums, engineer
- Sam Pearton – drums
- Brock Fitzgerald – guitar
- Jérémie Orsel Des Sagets – guitar, bass guitar
- Fred Kevorkian – engineer
- Didier Léglise – engineer
- Scott Horscroft – engineer, percussion, mixer
- James Traill – photography
