= (I Just Wanna) B with U =

1991 single by Transvision Vamp

Single by Transvision Vamp

from the album Little Magnets Versus the Bubble of Babble
- B-side: "Swamp Thang"; "Straight Thru Your Head"; "Punky Says"
- Released: 2 April 1991
- Length: 4:24
- Label: MCA
- Songwriters: Nick Christian Sayer; Wendy James
- Producer: Duncan Bridgeman

Transvision Vamp singles chronology
"Born to Be Sold" (1989)	"(I Just Wanna) B with U" (1991)	"If Looks Could Kill" (1991)

"(I Just Wanna) B with U" is a song by the English pop rock band Transvision Vamp, released in April 1991 by MCA Records as the lead single from their third and final studio album, Little Magnets Versus the Bubble of Babble (1991). It was also the first of their singles to be co-written by Wendy James. After a two-year gap since their previous single, "Born to Be Sold", "B with U" reached number 30 on the UK Singles Chart and number 16 in Australia.

== Track listings ==
The live tracks on the US releases were recorded at the Manchester Apollo on 24 October 1989.

- 7-inch and cassette single

A1. "(I Just Wanna) B with U"
B1. "Swamp Thang"
B2. "Straight Thru Your Head"

- 12-inch single

A1. "(I Just Wanna) B with U" (The Nightripper mix)
B1. "Swamp Thang"
B2. "Straight Thru Your Head"

- 12-inch gatefold single

A1. "(I Just Wanna) B with U" (The Nightripper mix)
B1. "Swamp Thang"
B2. "Straight Thru Your Head"
B3. "Punky Says"

- CD single
1. "(I Just Wanna) B with U" (7-inch version) – 4:24
2. "(I Just Wanna) B with U" (The Nightripper mix) – 4:53
3. "Swamp Thang" – 3:48
4. "Straight Thru Your Head" – 2:41
- US 12-inch single

A1. "(I Just Wanna) B with U" (The Nightripper mix) – 4:53
A2. "(I Just Wanna) B with U" (alternative 12-inch mix) – 6:02
B1. "Trash City" (live) – 5:14
B2. "Tell That Girl To Shut Up" (live) – 3:12
B3. "Sex Kick" (live) – 6:17
B4. "I Want Your Love" (live) – 3:40

- US CD single
1. "(I Just Wanna) B with U" (album version) – 4:23
2. "Trash City" (live) – 5:14
3. "Tell That Girl To Shut Up" (live) – 3:12
4. "Sex Kick" (live) – 6:17
5. "I Want Your Love" (live) – 3:40
6. "(I Just Wanna) B with U" (Nightripper mix) – 4:52

Note: The Nightripper mix is misprinted as the 12-inch version on the single

== Charts ==
Chart (1991)	Peak position
Australia (ARIA)	16
Europe (Eurochart Hot 100)	66
Ireland (IRMA)	30
Finland (Suomen virallinen lista)	15
Spain (AFYVE)	10
UK Singles (OCC)	30
UK Airplay (Music Week)	23
US Modern Rock Tracks (Billboard)	14
