= Landslide of Love =

1989 single by Transvision Vamp

Single by Transvision Vamp

from the album Velveteen
- B-side: "Hardtime"; "He's the Only One for Me"; "W11 Blues"
- Released: 24 July 1989
- Length: 3:50
- Label: MCA
- Songwriter: Nick Christian Sayer
- Producers: Duncan Bridgeman; Zeus B. Held

Transvision Vamp singles chronology
"Baby I Don't Care" (1989)	"Landslide of Love" (1989)	"The Only One" (1989)

Professional ratings
Review scores
Source	Rating
Number One	4/5 stars

"Landslide of Love" is a song by the English pop rock band Transvision Vamp, released on 24 July 1989 by MCA Records as the second single from their second studio album, Velveteen (1989). It was a top 20 UK hit in 1989, spending five weeks on the UK singles chart and peaking at No. 14.

== Critical reception ==
A Smash Hits reviewer gave a mostly positive review of the single, writing that Wendy James' voice reminded her of the early works of Cyndi Lauper but noting that the track lacks "the grab" of "Baby I Don't Care".

== Track listings ==
7-inch and cassette single

1. "Landslide of Love"
2. "Hardtime" (Anthony Doughty)
3. "He's the Only One for Me" (Dave Parsons)
- A limited-edition 7-inch picture disc was also released.

12-inch single

A1. "Landslide of Love" (extended)
A2. "W11 Blues"
B1. "Hardtime"
B2. "He's the Only One for Me"

- A limited edition 12-inch gatefold sleeve version was also released.

CD single

1. "Landslide of Love" (7-inch version) – 3:50
2. "W11 Blues" – 4:51
3. "Hardtime" – 3:37
4. "He's the Only One for Me" – 3:32

== Charts ==
Chart (1989)	Peak position
Australia (ARIA)	70
Belgium (Ultratop 50 Flanders)	47
Europe (Eurochart Hot 100)	45
Ireland (IRMA)	8
UK Singles (Official Charts)	14
