= The Only One (Transvision Vamp song) =

Single by Transvision Vamp

from the album Velveteen
- B-side: "The Mystery Song"; "Love Me"
- Released: 28 August 1989
- Recorded: 1989
- Genre: Pop rock; power pop
- Length: 3:50; 4:19 (album version)
- Label: MCA; TVV 7
- Songwriter: Nick Christian Sayer
- Producers: Duncan Bridgeman; Zeus B. Held

Transvision Vamp singles chronology
"Landslide of Love" (1989)	"The Only One" (1989)	"Born to Be Sold" (1989)

"The Only One" is a song by the English pop rock band Transvision Vamp, released on 28 August 1989 by MCA Records as the third single from their second studio album Velveteen. It was a UK Top 20 hit in 1989 and peaked at No. 15, spending a total of six weeks on the chart. The sleeve design was similar to that of the first single from the album "Baby I Don't Care", this time featuring the band against a panelled backdrop printed with a large photo of the American actress and model Marilyn Monroe.

== Critical reception ==
Eleanor Levy left positive review on this single for the British music newspaper Record Mirror. She called it "messy pop rock'n'roll" with "feisty little tune". New Musical Express' reviewer Barry Egan also liked "The Only One". He considered that it lacks immediate attraction of "Baby I Don't Care" but, in time, listeners will learn "to stop worrying and love it". In turn Bob Stanley of Melody Maker was disappointed by song. As per him: "This features a cute-as-pie verse, but goes all wonky on the chorus – awkward time changes, no discernible hook."

== Track listing ==
7" vinyl (TVV 7)

1. "The Only One" (7" Version) – 3:50
2. "The Mystery Song" (Dave Parsons) – 3:18
3. "Love Me" (Anthony Doughty) – 3:17

12" vinyl (TVVT 7)

1. "The Only One" (Extended Mix) – 5:50
2. "The Mystery Song" – 3:18
3. "Love Me" – 3:17

CD single (DTVVT 7)

1. "The Only One" (7" Version) – 3:50
2. "The Mystery Song" – 3:18
3. "Love Me" – 3:17
4. "The Only One" (Extended Mix) – 5:50

== Charts ==
Chart performance for "The Only One"
Chart (1989)	Peak position
Australia (ARIA)	30
New Zealand (Recorded Music NZ)	22
UK Singles (OCC)	15
