= 13 Steps Lead Down =

1994 song by Elvis Costello

Single by Elvis Costello

from the album Brutal Youth
- B-side: "Do You Know What I'm Saying?"
- Released: 18 April 1994
- Genre: New wave; punk rock
- Label: Warner Bros.
- Songwriter: Elvis Costello
- Producers: Mitchell Froom; Elvis Costello

Elvis Costello singles chronology
"Sulky Girl" (1994)	"13 Steps Lead Down" (1994)	"You Tripped at Every Step" (1994)

"13 Steps Lead Down" is a song written and performed by English new wave musician Elvis Costello that was first released on his fourteenth studio album, Brutal Youth (1994). Written quickly during a day-long session, the song features lyrics referencing El Escorial and the twelve-step recovery movement. The track is one of those on Brutal Youth that features the reunited Attractions, Costello's longtime backing band.

"13 Steps Lead Down" was released as the second single from Brutal Youth, reaching number 59 in the UK. It has since been lauded by critics as a return to his punk origins and it has become a live favorite.

== Background ==
"13 Steps Lead Down" was written quickly during a one-day writing spree by Costello; during this same day, Costello wrote "Rocking Horse Road," "Pony St.," "Clown Strike," "Still Too Soon to Know," and "Just About Glad." Costello recalled, "I would work for about half an hour with the guitar cranked up really loud, and make a tape of just anything that came into my head. I did it in bursts, and then I listened to see if any of it was interesting. A lot of it was gibberish".

The song's title, according to Costello, "refers to that number being used to instill dread in those entering the Tomb of the Spanish Kings at El Escorial". He elaborated on the song's lyrical content, "Not that the song continues much with that theme — it was more for those who could not subscribe to the new fashion of sobriety". Critics have pointed to the song as critical of the twelve-step recovery movement.

The track was one of the songs on Brutal Youth that featured Costello's reunited backing band the Attractions. Costello later named "13 Steps Lead Down" and "Sulky Girl" as "reminders that [the Attractions] could also be a pretty great rock and roll band". The song closes with what Rick Anderson of AllMusic describes as "one of his patented atonal solos".

== Release and reception ==
"13 Steps Lead Down" was released as the second single from Brutal Youth in the UK, following "Sulky Girl". The single was moderately successful, reaching number 59 in the UK. In 1995, Costello criticized the label for releasing the single in the UK, claiming the song was chosen "for no better reason than the fact there was a video made for it" and asserting, "I knew that was never going to be a hit in England."

The song also reached number 15 on the Billboard Bubbling Under chart as well as number six on the Billboard Modern Rock chart. The song has since appeared on an EP of the same name as well as on the compilation album Extreme Honey.

"13 Steps Lead Down" has generally seen positive reception from critics. AllMusic's Stewart Mason called the song "the best and most Attractions-like song" from Brutal Youth, while Neil Strauss of The New York Times named it as one of the songs from Brutal Youth that "hold up to the band's best work from the late 1970's, but ... also dared to be different". Noel Murray and Keith Phipps of The A.V. Club dubbed the song "one of Costello’s all-time best fist-pumping stingers" and Jeremy Allen of The Guardian called it a "classic". J. D. Considine of The Baltimore Sun named the song as a moment on Brutal Youth "where you could almost close your eyes and imagine that it's 1978 again", while Ed Masley of The Arizona Republic described the song as a highlight of the album that "rock[s] with the infectious charge".

Brian Hiatt of Entertainment Weekly named the song as one of Costello's top ten tracks, stating, "This insistent, noisy punk track stands up against Costello and the Attractons' early landmarks".

=== Non-album B-sides ===
In the early nineties, Costello was enlisted by Wendy James to write an entire album for her called Now Ain't the Time for Your Tears, with Costello's versions remaining unreleased until 1994, when many showed up as B-sides to Brutal Youth singles.

- "Do You Know What I'm Saying?" - 7"
- "Puppet Girl" - 12"
- "Basement Kiss" - 12"
- "We Despise You" 12"

== Performance history ==
"13 Steps Lead Down" has been performed live by Costello since the Brutal Youth tour. Costello and the reunited Attractions debuted the song live on Late Show with David Letterman in 1994, ending the song with the closing to "Radio Radio"; Letterman, a longtime Costello fan, was so impressed by the band's performance of the song that he brought the band back to perform again within months. Costello also performed the song for a scene in a season 3 episode of The Larry Sanders Show before trashing his dressing room.

== Charts ==
Chart (1994)	Peak position
Australia (ARIA)	137
UK Singles (Official Charts)	59
UK Airplay (Music Week)	39
US Bubbling Under Hot 100 (Billboard)	15
US Modern Rock Tracks (Billboard)	6
