= Brutal Youth =

Studio album by Elvis Costello
- Released: 8 March 1994
- Recorded: 7 December 1992 – 7 February 1994
- Studios: Olympic Studios, London, England
- Genres: Alternative rock; punk rock; power pop
- Length: 56:55
- Label: Warner Bros.
- Producers: Mitchell Froom and Elvis Costello

Elvis Costello chronology
Live at the El Mocambo (1993)	Brutal Youth (1994)	The Very Best of Elvis Costello and The Attractions 1977–86 (1994)

Singles from Brutal Youth
- 1. "Sulky Girl" Released: February 1994; 2. "13 Steps Lead Down" Released: April 1994; 3. "You Tripped at Every Step" Released: July 1994; 4. "London's Brilliant Parade" Released: November 1994

Professional ratings
Initial reviews (in 1994)
Review scores
Source	Rating
Chicago Tribune	3.5/4 stars
Entertainment Weekly	B−
Los Angeles Times	4/4 stars
Music Week	4/5 stars
NME	9/10
Q	4/5 stars
Rolling Stone	3/5 stars
Select	3/5 medals
Vox	8/10

Professional ratings
Retrospective reviews (after 1994)
Review scores
Source	Rating
AllMusic	2.5/5 stars
Blender	3/5 stars
Encyclopedia of Popular Music	3/5 stars
Uncut	4/5 stars

Brutal Youth is the fourteenth studio album by English musician Elvis Costello, released in 1994. It contains the first recordings Costello made with his band the Attractions since Blood and Chocolate (1986). Brutal Youth was the third, and most recent of Costello's albums, to peak at number two in the UK Albums Chart, following on from Armed Forces (1979) and Get Happy!! (1980).

About half the album features a band consisting of Costello (guitar), Steve Nieve (keyboards) and Pete Thomas (drums) with Nick Lowe (not a member of the Attractions) on bass. Costello himself plays bass on two tracks (2 and 8), and the complete Attractions line-up (Nieve, Pete Thomas and Bruce Thomas on bass) appears with Costello on tracks 3, 4, 6, 9 and 10.

== Content ==
Costello began writing the material for Brutal Youth after writing a set of pop punk songs for Wendy James' 1993 album Now Ain't the Time for Your Tears. Under the working title Idiophone (named for an instrument "made of naturally sonorous material"), Costello began recording these songs at Pathway Studios with former Attractions drummer Pete Thomas; he explained in a 1994 interview, "To be honest with you, I have to admit that I had decided to do this record all by myself. But then I had to face this reality: I'll never be a drummer. So I called Pete." Ultimately, Costello found the minimalist sound at Pathway, where he recorded My Aim Is True, to be limiting, moving recording to Olympic Studios.

Upon arriving at Olympic, Costello recruited another ex-Attraction, keyboardist Steve Nieve, as well as former producer Nick Lowe on bass guitar. Though this arrangement, informally nicknamed "the Distractions", performed on a significant portion of the album, Lowe bowed out on tracks that he felt required a more melodic and complex style of playing than he could provide. At the urging of producer Mitchell Froom, who had been a fan of the Attractions, Costello recruited the final missing Attraction, Bruce Thomas, who had worked on other records with Froom at the time. Thomas and Costello had the most fraught relationship of all the former bandmates, making Costello initially hesitant to make the call:

The extension of using Mitchell was that he'd been working with Bruce Thomas, and it smoothed the process of getting back with him. I probably wouldn't have made that call if it had been down to me. But once we met up at a party at Pete Thomas's, we got along fine, and it seemed a natural thing to use him.

Nick has this great pretence that he can't play anything with more than five chords in it. I wouldn't say he's lazy about things, it's just that he prefers songs where he can get a groove figure that goes through all the chord changes. Bruce loves the challenge of trying to thread the same sort of line through a more complex set of changes. That's the difference in their approach. Some songs suited Nick, some Bruce, and in between I ended up playing bass on "Kinder Murder," and the bridge of "Just About Glad," just because the amateur approach seemed to be appropriate.

Although only five songs on the album feature the full Attractions line-up, Brutal Youth was marketed as an Attractions reunion album, Costello sought to dispel notions that the album was a retro pastiche and that the reunion was a bid for commercial relevance. He commented, "It was a lazy way out — I think everybody at the company recognises that now. We were going through the beginnings of the recent upheaval, the corporate insanity at Warners, which affected everything at the company. It gave the troops of the company much less leeway to be creative. Therefore they grabbed hold of the one thing they saw as a saleable feature, which was, hey, the band is back, and they're rockin'! It's a bit of a simplification."

== Critical reception ==
Trouser Press wrote: "Throughout, deft instrumental touches, superb singing and the easy confidence of a still-competitive athlete returning to the scene of his greatest triumph make this another effortless win." In The Village Voice's annual Pazz & Jop critics poll for the year's best albums, Brutal Youth finished at No. 31.

It was among the six Costello albums featured in the book 1001 Albums You Must Hear Before You Die.

== Track listing ==
All tracks are written by Declan MacManus unless otherwise indicated.

No.	Title	Length
1.	"Pony St."	3:25
2.	"Kinder Murder"	3:25
3.	"13 Steps Lead Down"	3:16
4.	"This Is Hell"	4:27
5.	"Clown Strike"	4:05
6.	"You Tripped at Every Step"	4:12
7.	"Still Too Soon to Know"	2:19
8.	"20% Amnesia"	3:26
9.	"Sulky Girl"	5:07
10.	"London's Brilliant Parade"	4:23
11.	"My Science Fiction Twin"	4:10
12.	"Rocking Horse Road"	4:03
13.	"Just About Glad"	3:14
14.	"All the Rage"	3:52
15.	"Favourite Hour"	3:31
Total length:		56:55

2002 Rhino Bonus disc
No.	Title	Writer(s)	Length
1.	"Life Shrinks" (B-side of "It's Time")		3:37
2.	"Favourite Hour" (Church Studios Version)		3:32
3.	"This Is Hell" (Church Studios Version)		4:10
4.	"Idiophone" (B-side of "Sulky Girl")		1:58
5.	"Abandon Words" (Vocals recorded at home. Bass & drums recorded at The Church Studios)		2:55
6.	"Poisoned Letter" (Previously unreleased)		3:48
7.	"A Drunken Man's Praise of Sobriety" (B-side of "Sulky Girl" & "13 Steps Lead Down")	MacManus, William Butler Yeats	1:08
8.	"Pony St." (Bonaparte Rooms Version)		3:36
9.	"Just About Glad" (Bonaparte Rooms Version)		3:41
10.	"Clown Strike" (Bonaparte Rooms Version)		4:19
11.	"Rocking Horse Road" (Demo)		3:18
12.	"13 Steps Lead Down" (Demo)		2:07
13.	"All the Rage" (Demo)		3:38
14.	"Sulky Girl" (Demo)		4:31
15.	"You Tripped at Every Step" (Church Studios Version)		3:25

=== B-sides available on the 13 Steps Lead Down EP ===
1. "Puppet Girl"
2. "Basement Kiss"
3. "We Despise You"

=== London's Brilliant Parade (EP) ===
- "London's Brilliant Parade"
- "Sweet Dreams"
- "The Loved Ones"
- "From Head to Toe"

== Personnel ==
- Elvis Costello – guitar, vocals, piano on 15; bass on 2 and 8

The Attractions

- Steve Nieve – organ, piano, harmonium
- Bruce Thomas – bass on 3, 4, 6, 9–10
- Pete Thomas – drums, percussion

with:

- Nick Lowe – bass on 1, 5, 7, 11–14

== Charts ==
Chart performance for Brutal Youth
Chart (1994)	Peak position
Australian Albums (ARIA)	55
UK Albums (Official Charts)	2
US Billboard 200	34

Singles and EP

Year	Song	Chart	Position
1994	"13 Steps Lead Down"	Billboard Modern Rock Tracks	6
1994	"13 Steps Lead Down"	UK Singles Chart	59
1994	"Sulky Girl"	UK Singles Chart	22
1994	"London's Brilliant Parade (EP)"	UK Singles Chart	48

== Cultural depictions ==
Costello appeared on "People's Choice", a 1994 episode of The Larry Sanders Show, playing himself and promoting Brutal Youth; he and the Attractions play a live version of "13 Steps Lead Down."
