= London's Brilliant =

1993 single by Wendy James

Single by Wendy James

from the album Now Ain't the Time for Your Tears
- B-side: "My Ballad to 46th Street"; "I Will Never Be Your Lover"; "To All Beginnings"
- Released: 5 April 1993
- Recorded: United Kingdom
- Genre: Alternative rock; pop-punk
- Length: 2:29
- Label: MCA
- Songwriters: Elvis Costello; Cait O'Riordan
- Producer: Chris Kimsey

Wendy James singles chronology
"The Nameless One" (1993)	"London's Brilliant" (1993)	"Do You Know What I'm Saying?" (1993)

"London's Brilliant" is a song by the former Transvision Vamp lead singer Wendy James. It was released in 1993 as the second single from her debut solo album Now Ain't the Time for Your Tears and was written by Elvis Costello and his then wife Cait O'Riordan. The single was unsuccessful upon release, peaking at a low number sixty-two on the UK Singles Chart.

Costello released his demo of the song on one version of his 1994 EP for "London's Brilliant Parade". Costello asserted that the similarity in title between the songs did not mean they were connected: "It just has the coincidence of a similar title."

== Background ==
Speaking of the song, James told NME in 1993, "The song is basically a parody of me and my life, and the snobbery that goes on in the West London area."

== Critical reception ==
Upon its release as a single, Chris Roberts of Melody Maker commented that James "brings us another burst of abattoir Costello, more Clash than flash, all impossibly wry wordplay and Ladbroke Grove fear and loathing". He added, "Another crackle of pop genius from Allan Jones' favourite chanteuse."

== Track listings ==
CD single/maxi-single

1. "London's Brilliant" – 2:29
2. "My Ballad to 46th Street" – 3:15 (Wendy James/Neil Taylor)
3. "I Will Never Be Your Lover" – 4:48 (James/Taylor)

12" single

1. "London's Brilliant" – 2:29
2. "To All Beginnings" (James/Taylor)
3. "My Ballad to 46th Street" – 3:15

== Charts ==
Chart (1993)	Peak Position
UK Singles Chart	62
