= Dogtail =

Dogtail, dog tail, or dog's tail may refer to:

== Plants ==
- Buddleja asiatica, a species of flowering plant called dogtail
- Cynosurus cristatus, a species of grass called crested dog's-tail
- Cynosurus echinatus, a species of grass called bristly dogstail grass or hedgehog dogtail

== Others ==
- The tail in Dog anatomy
- Dogtail (software), an open-source automated graphical user interface (GUI) test framework
- Dogtail Corners, a location in Dover, New York
- Dog Tails, a long story collection by Aziz Nesin

== See also ==
- "A Dog's Tale", a 1903 short story by Mark Twain
- A Dog's Tale (play), a 2020 play by Mikron Theatre Company § Productions
- Dog Tales, a 2000s–2010s documentary TV series
- Dog Tales (film), a 1958 animated film
- Puppy Dog Tails (disambiguation)
