= The Complete 12″ers Collection Vol. 1 =

The Complete 12"ers Collection Vol. 1

Compilation album by Transvision Vamp
- Released: 1990
- Recorded: 1987–1989
- Genre: Pop rock
- Length: 63:37
- Labels: MCA Records; WMC5-75
- Producers: Duncan Bridgeman; Zeus B. Held

Transvision Vamp chronology
Velveteen (1989)	The Complete 12"ers Collection Vol. 1 (1990)	Little Magnets Versus the Bubble of Babble (1991)

The Complete 12"ers Collection Vol. 1 is a 1990 compilation album by the English band Transvision Vamp that was released on the MCA Records label in Japan on CD only. The album contains extended and remixed versions together with selected b-sides that originally appeared on a variety of formats (see below).

The twelve-page booklet contains the lyrics in English and a fold-out insert essay, in Japanese, by Michinari Yamada.

== Track listing ==
1. "Revolution Baby" (Electra-Glide Mix) - 6:05 (Taken from the UK CD and 12" singles)
2. "Vid Kid Vamp" - 2:58 (Originally the b-side to Revolution Baby - see 'Notes')
3. "Tell That Girl to Shut Up" (Extended Mix) - 6:23 (Taken from the UK CD and 12" singles)
4. "Tell That Girl to Shut Up" (Knuckle Duster Mix) - 4:46 (Taken from the UK CD and 12" singles)
5. "God Save the Royalties" - 3:15 (Originally the b-side to Tell That Girl to Shut Up)
6. "I Want Your Love" (I Don't Want Your Money Mix) - 6:20 (Taken from the UK CD and 12" singles)
7. "Sweet Thing" - 4:53 (Originally the b-side to I Want Your Love)
8. "Evolution Evie" (Electric Version) - 2:54 (Originally the b-side to I Want Your Love)
9. "Honey Honey" - 2:39 (Originally the b-side to Revolution Baby)
10. "Long Lonely Weekend" - 3:36 (Originally the b-side to Revolution Baby)
11. "Sister Moon" (Groove On) - 6:08 (Taken from the UK 12" single)
12. "Walk On By" - 3:23 (Originally the b-side to Sister Moon)
13. "Sex Kick" (Ciao Portobello) - 7:21 (Originally the b-side to the Sister Moon CD and 12" single)
14. "Oh Yeah" - 2:53 (Originally the b-side to Sister Moon)

== Notes ==
"Vid Kid Vamp" is the original version from the 1987 release of "Revolution Baby" and not the remix that appeared on the 1988 reissue.
