= The Price of the Ticket (album) =

Studio album by Wendy James
- Released: 19 February 2016
- Label: MCA
- Producer: Wendy James

Wendy James chronology
I Came Here to Blow Minds (2011)	The Price of the Ticket (2016)	Queen High Straight (2019)

The Price of the Ticket is the third solo studio album by the English singer-songwriter and former Transvision Vamp vocalist Wendy James. Released in February 2016, it was written and produced by James, except for the final two tracks, which are cover versions of songs by Fred "Sonic" Smith and Bob Dylan.

== Background ==
The Price of the Ticket was recorded mainly in New York City, with the final two tracks being recorded in Berkeley, California to accommodate James Williamson. The album cover features a photograph of James topless, of which she stated, "I don't actually find it a particularly sexual shot in as much as you look at images of Rihanna or the way I was in the old days being flirtatious and provocative [...] Much more like an art or fashion photograph or sculpture or just female anatomy as it is in other areas of creativity but not the music business." Some of the tracks contain autobiographical material, with "Screamin' Back Washington" a reference to James being adopted: "It's very honest. I was just imagining what it is like for any woman to ... I'm thanking her for giving birth to me as opposed to having an abortion, but imagining how difficult it must be for any woman to give birth to a child and then give it away. Even if they are doing it for all the right reasons."

== Track listing ==
All tracks are written by Wendy James, except where noted.

1. "Paloma's Downs"
2. "Indigent Blues"
3. "King Rat"
4. "Love from the 9th"
5. "Bad Intentions and a Bit of Cruelty"
6. "You're a Dirtbomb, Lester"
7. "Screamin' Back Washington"
8. "Why Oh Why Do You Hurt Me Still?"
9. "Farewell to Love"
10. "Cowboy Rhythm"
11. "Situation Normal at Surfrider"
12. "You're So Great" (Fred "Sonic" Smith)
13. "It's Alright Ma" (Bob Dylan)

== Personnel ==
- Wendy James – vocals, rhythm guitar, keyboards, piano
- Lenny Kaye – rhythm and lead guitar
- Glen Matlock – bass
- James Sclavunos – drums
- James Williamson – guitar and bass (tracks 12 and 13)
- Steve Mackay – baritone saxophone (track 13)

== Charts ==
Chart (2016)	Peak position
Scottish Albums (OCC)	72
UK Albums (OCC)	128
UK Independent Albums (OCC)	13
