= Los Romeos (Spanish band) =

- Origin: Castellón, Spain
- Genres: Pop punk, garage
- Years active: 1988–1996
- Labels: Hispavox, Magna Music
- Past members: Patrizia Escoin (vocals), Pedro López Moreno (bass), Juan Carlos Tomás (guitar), Jose Ángel Leiros (drums)

Los Romeos (The Romeos) were a Spanish pop-punk group formed in Castellón in 1988 by the vocalist Patrizia Escoin and ex-members of the group Morcillo el Bellaco y Los Rítmicos.

== Biography ==
Los Romeos formed in Castellón in 1988 when Pedro López Moreno, Juan Carlos "Juanki" Tomás and Jose Ángel Leiros, all members of the disbanded Morcillo el Bellaco y Los Rítmicos, joined the flamboyant and stylish singer Patricia Fernández Escoin to create a new group. Influenced by female-fronted bands like Blondie and Transvision Vamp, they released their first single, "Muérdeme" ("Bite Me"), in 1990 and achieved great success with the Spanish public before the release of their self-titled first album, Los Romeos, through the Spanish record label Hispavox. The album collected "Muérdeme" with "Mi vida rosa" ("My Wonderful Life"), "Un poquito de amor" ("A Little Bit of Love") and "El mundo a tus pies" ("The World at Your Feet"), a re-worked cover of "Sunday Girl" by Blondie.

Two years later they released their second album, Sangre caliente (Hot Blood), which supplied two singles, "Arañas mi piel" ("You Scratch My Skin") and "Cuando llega mi amor" ("When My Love Is Here"). In 1996, they released their third and final album, Sin conexión (Unconnected), but it was badly promoted by their new record label, Magna Music, and sales were very poor. Soon afterwards, the band broke up. At present, Patrizia Escoin is part of the three-piece Lula.

== Discography ==
=== Studio albums ===
- Los Romeos (Hispavox, 1990).
- Sangre Caliente (Hispavox, 1992).
- Sin Conexión (Magna Music, 1996).

=== Singles ===
- "Muérdeme" (Hispavox, 1990).
- "Mi vida rosa" (Hispavox, 1990).
- "Un poquito de amor" (Hispavox, 1990).
- "El mundo a tus pies" (Hispavox, 1990).
- "Arañas mi piel" (Hispavox, 1992).
- "Cuando llega mi amor" (Hispavox, 1992).
