= Sulky Girl =

1994 song by Elvis Costello

Single by Elvis Costello

from the album Brutal Youth
- B-side: "A Drunken Man's Praise of Sobriety"
- Released: 21 February 1994
- Genre: New wave
- Label: Warner Bros.
- Songwriter: Elvis Costello
- Producers: Mitchell Froom; Elvis Costello

Elvis Costello singles chronology
"Jacksons, Monk and Rowe" (1993)	"Sulky Girl" (1994)	"13 Steps Lead Down" (1994)

"Sulky Girl" is a song written and performed by English new wave musician Elvis Costello, that was first released on his fourteenth studio album, Brutal Youth (1994). The song was one of those on the album that featured Costello performing with his longtime backing band the Attractions, who reunited during the course of the album's recording. As such, Costello singled out the song as an instance of the band's ability to play loudly and aggressively.

"Sulky Girl" was released as the first single from Brutal Youth in February 1994 and became Costello's highest charting UK single in eleven years, although Costello chalked up this success to successful promotion by Warner Bros. as opposed to organic commercial appeal. The song's classic Attractions style garnered the song critical acclaim and the song has since appeared on Costello compilation albums.

== Background ==
Costello wrote "Sulky Girl" shortly after a one-day writing spree by Costello where he composed six of the songs that would appear on the Brutal Youth album.

The track was one of the songs on Brutal Youth that featured Costello's reunited backing band the Attractions. Costello later named "13 Steps Lead Down" and "Sulky Girl" as "reminders that [the Attractions] could also be a pretty great rock and roll band". Recalling the sessions in a 1994 interview, he stated:

We hit the end of the chorus, and it was just roaring. Everybody was taking it as far as they could. It was the first time we'd played anything hard since coming back. Mitchell Froom came out of the control room, and it looked like what he'd heard had parted his hair. This band can plaster you against the back wall when it wants to.

== Release ==
"Sulky Girl" was released as the first single from Brutal Youth in the UK. The B-side is "A Drunken Man's Praise of Sobriety", where Costello sings the Yeats poem of the same name over an instrumental. The song's traditional sound made it a candidate for commercial success, to the point that Phillip Leblond of Rock & Folk said of the song, "Think of that: on this album, there is a single by Elvis Costello THAT COULD BECOME A HIT! Don't move, I'm going to call Warner..."

The single reached number 22 in the UK, the highest charting Costello single there since "Pills and Soap" in 1983. Despite this, Costello did not view the single as an organic hit and credited it to record company promotion: "'Sulky Girl' they'd managed to chart and we'd gone on Top of the Pops — but basically it was the usual major record company hocus-pocus that got us into the charts, it didn't actually sell convincingly." The song was not released as a single in the US; a writer for the Washington Post described it as "a great new song that radio won't play."

The song has since appeared on an EP of the same name as well as on the compilation albums Extreme Honey and The Very Best of Elvis Costello.

== Critical reception ==
"Sulky Girl" saw positive reception from music writers upon its release. In a column for Melody Maker, Greg Dulli of Afghan Whigs praised the song, commenting, "This is a throwback for Elvis. But he's throwing back to himself. I like this, A lot of sounds going on. He sings the hell out of a tune. Layer after layer of irony, he can't be any other way. ... He's a brilliant satirist — he should probably write books. It's very bitter. I wonder if he wrote it about Cait?" Rolling Stone noted, that the "signature riff of 'Sulky Girl' harkens back to the stripped-down style of My Aim Is True," while CD Review wrote, "'Sulky Girl' trots out three different chorus hooks, all of them killer." Hot Press observed, that on the song, Costello and the Attractions are "revamping their typically abrasive and claustrophobic sound and soldering the whole lot to a thoroughly modern 1990's sensibility. All the word play of Armed Forces is present but so too, in an uncanny and rather frightening manner, is that unmistakable sound of the cascading keyboards of 'Oliver's Army.'"

Retrospectively, Jeremy Allen of The Guardian called it a "classic", while Anthony Breznican wrote, "I fell hard for 'Sulky Girl,' as I tended to do in real life." Gary Stewart of Trunkworthy praised "the chorus and that melody, which is instantly catchy and so inspired it makes even the most jaded music snob think of the dreaded cliche, 'How does he come up with this?'" Diffuser.fm praised the song's "raw vitality."

Paste Magazine ranked "Sulky Girl" as the fourth greatest Elvis Costello song, stating that on Brutal Youth, "Costello was free to let his ravaged vocals tatter in and around soaring power-pop ballads, the best of which is 'Sulky Girl,' a song comparing the narrator’s current partner with another, less sure but still desirable woman who ran away from home, dyed her hair and adopted a new name."

== Music video ==
The accompanying music video for "Sulky Girl" was directed by British photographer and director Brian Griffin and produced by Cornelia Fieldon for Produktion. It was released on 21 February 1994 and made as a mini film with a '30's Berlin flavour featuring extraordinary Swiss woman confronted with exhibits from her life in a theatre as Costello narrates.

== Charts ==
Chart (1994)	Peak position
Australia (ARIA)	162
UK Singles (Official Charts)	22
UK Airplay (Music Week)	34
