= Queen High Straight =

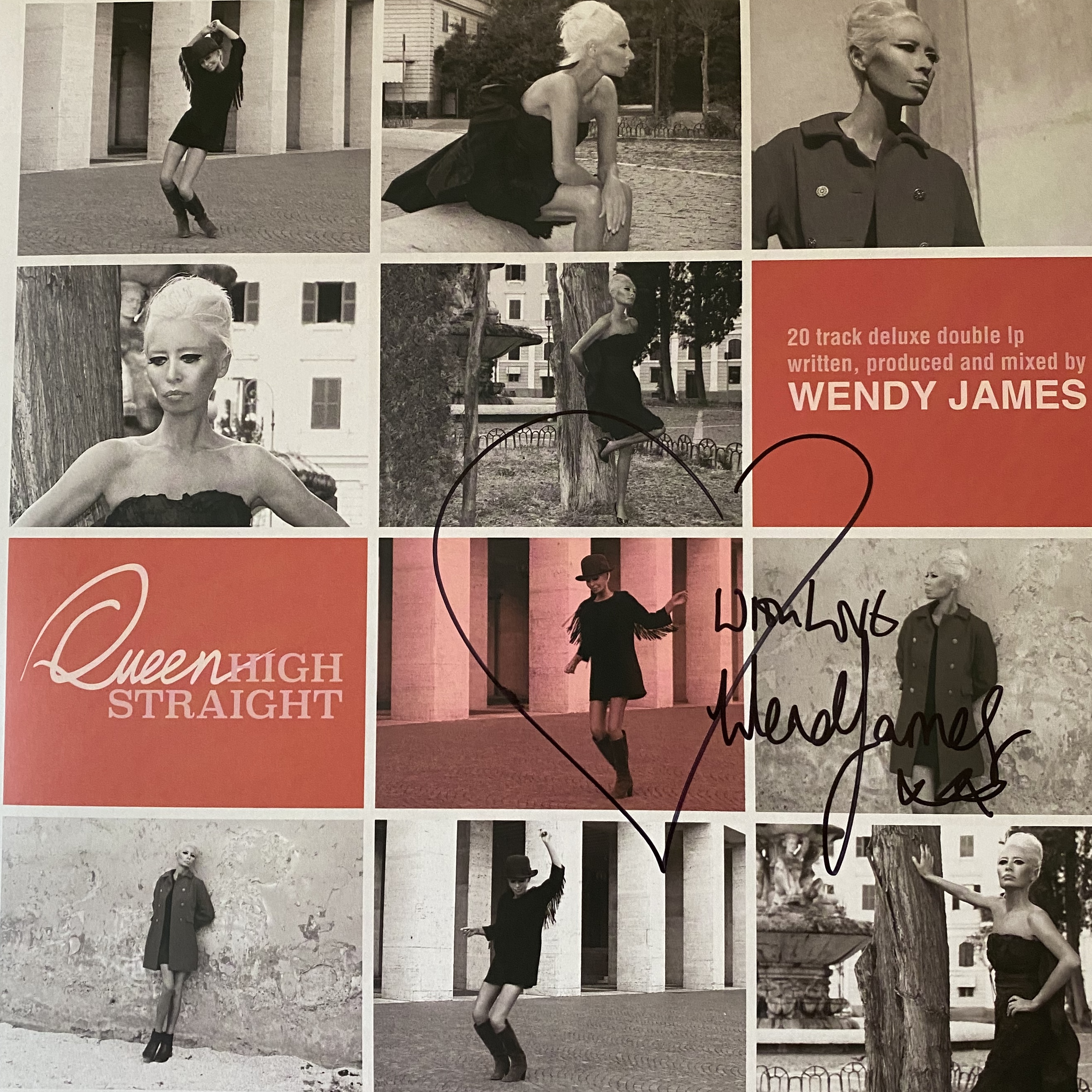

Studio album by Wendy James
- Released: 1 May 2020
- Label: MCA
- Producer: Wendy James

Wendy James chronology
| The Price of the Ticket (2016) | Queen High Straight (2020) | The Shape of History (2024) |

Queen High Straight is the fourth solo album by the former Transvision Vamp lead singer Wendy James. Released on 1 May 2020, it was written, produced and mixed by James.

Professional ratings
Review scores
| Source | Rating |
|---|---|
| Classic Pop Magazine | 3/5 stars |
| UK Music Review | 4/5 stars |
| Narc Magazine | 4/5 stars |

== Background ==
The album took three years from inception, through writing stage, to the final masters for the 20 tracks that feature on the album. References and influences range from Sergio Mendes for the title track, Django Reinhardt for 'I'll Be Here When The Morning Comes', and Motown for 'Little Melvin' and 'Here Comes the Beautiful One'

The album was released physically on CD, and as a double vinyl album. The album was also released as a digital download.

== Track listing ==
All songs by Wendy James

1. "Queen High Straight [4.31]"
2. "Perilous Beauty [4.08]"
3. "Free Man Walk [3.39]"
4. "Stomp Down, Snuck Up [4.14]"
5. "Little Melvin [4.52]"
6. "Marlene Et Fleur [4.00]"
7. "A Heart Breaking Liar's Promise [5.11]"
8. "Here Comes The Beautiful One [3.45]"
9. "Chicken Street [4.13]"
10. "Testimonial [4.18]"
11. "Bar Room Brawl & Benzedrine Blues [4.07]"
12. "Ratfucking [2.37]"
13. "She Likes To Be [Underneath Somebody] [3.21]"
14. "Bliss Hotel [4.00]"
15. "Freak In [3.05]"
16. "The Impression Of Normalcy [3.36]"
17. "I'll Be Here When The Morning Comes [4.15]"
18. "Cancel It ... I'll See Him On Monday [3.37]"
19. "Sugar Boy [4.00]"
20. "Kill Some Time Blues [4.18]"

== Personnel ==
- Wendy James – vocals, rhythm guitar, keyboards, melodica
- James Sedwards – rhythm and lead guitar
- Harry Bohay – bass
- James Sclavunos – drums, percussion
- Alex J Ward – alto saxophone
- Terry Edwards – trumpet, cornet, flugelhorn, tenor and baritone saxophone
- Louis Vause – accordion

== Charts ==
| Chart (2020) | Peak position |
|---|---|
| Scottish Albums (OCC) | 74 |
| UK Independent Albums (OCC) | 16 |
