= Extreme Honey =

Extreme Honey: The Very Best of the Warner Brothers Years

Greatest hits album by Elvis Costello
- Released: 21 October 1997
- Genres: Alternative rock, power pop
- Length: 77:27
- Label: Warner Bros.

Elvis Costello chronology
Costello & Nieve (1996)	Extreme Honey: The Very Best of the Warner Brothers Years (1997)	Painted from Memory (1998)

Professional ratings
Review scores
Source	Rating
AllMusic	4/5 stars

Extreme Honey: The Very Best of the Warner Brothers Years is a compilation album by Elvis Costello, released in 1997. The album spanned songs from 1989 to 1997 that Costello had released under his contract with Warner Bros. Records. He described it as a "divorce settlement" from the label.

I have absolutely no complaint with the musical freedom I've been allowed over the past eight or nine years. I think I've exploited it in my own way, sometimes to the detriment of commercial logic. But the shoddy treatment I've had over the past two or three years had to end. I was either going to quit completely or they were going to let me out.

Costello had originally recorded a cover of Prince and the Revolution's "Pop Life" for inclusion, but Prince denied him permission to release it. The collection contains one exclusive track, "The Bridge I Burned". "The Bridge I Burned" features his son, Matt MacManus, on bass guitar.

== Track listing ==
All tracks are written by Elvis Costello unless otherwise indicated.

No.	Title	Writer(s)	Length
1.	"The Bridge I Burned"		5:19
2.	"Veronica"	Paul McCartney, Costello	3:09
3.	"Sulky Girl"		5:07
4.	"So Like Candy"	McCartney, Costello	4:36
5.	"13 Steps Lead Down"		3:18
6.	"All This Useless Beauty"		4:37
7.	"My Dark Life" (with Brian Eno)		6:19
8.	"The Other Side of Summer"		3:55
9.	"Kinder Murder"		3:26
10.	"Deep Dark Truthful Mirror"		4:06
11.	"Hurry Down Doomsday (The Bugs Are Taking Over)"	Costello, Jim Keltner	4:04
12.	"Poor Fractured Atlas" (with The Attractions)		4:01
13.	"The Birds Will Still Be Singing" (with The Brodsky Quartet)		4:23
14.	"London's Brilliant Parade" (with the Attractions)		4:22
15.	"Tramp the Dirt Down"		5:40
16.	"Couldn't Call It Unexpected No. 4"		3:50
17.	"I Want to Vanish" (with the Attractions)		3:15
18.	"All the Rage"		3:52
Total length:			77:27
