= The Nameless One (song) =

1993 song sung by Wendy James

Single by Wendy James

from the album Now Ain't the Time for Your Tears
- B-side: "I Just Don't Want It Anymore"; "May I Have Your Autograph"; "Only a Fool"; "I Need You Now"
- Released: 8 February 1993
- Recorded: United Kingdom
- Genre: Alternative rock
- Length: 5:30 (album version); 4:13 (single version)
- Label: MCA
- Songwriter: Elvis Costello
- Producer: Chris Kimsey

Wendy James singles chronology
"The Nameless One" (1993)	"London's Brilliant" (1993)

"The Nameless One" is the debut solo single by the former Transvision Vamp lead singer Wendy James. It was released in the first quarter of 1993 as the lead single from James' debut solo album Now Ain't the Time for Your Tears. Written by Elvis Costello, the song marked a more alternative direction in sound, slightly different from the pop/rock stylings of Transvision Vamp. The single met with limited success, only peaking at number thirty-four on the UK Singles Chart and spending just three weeks in the top one-hundred.

== Background ==
Speaking of the song, James told NME in 1993, "My personal interpretation of the song is having to face up to the fact that maybe you're not as great as you thought you were. It's certainly something I've come to terms with in the last couple of years. I've become a lot more realistic about myself and I'm certainly a lot less gregarious than I used to be." She added that the people named in the song are "generally [those] who aren't quite 'A' grade" celebrities.

== Critical reception ==
Upon its release, Jim Arundel of Melody Maker considered "The Nameless One" to be "an odd choice" for James' "big comeback single". He noted her "heavy-breathing over a humping old riff pumped full of electronic steroids".

== Track listings ==
CD single/7" single

1. "The Nameless One" – 4:13
2. "I Just Don't Want It Anymore" – 4:33 (written by Wendy James)

Maxi-single

1. "The Nameless One" – 4:13
2. "Only a Fool" – 4:21 (Wendy James)
3. "I Need You Now" – 4:25 (Wendy James)

Maxi double

1. "The Nameless One" – 4:13
2. "I Just Don't Want It Anymore" – 4:33
3. "May I Have Your Autograph" – 4:08 (Wendy James)

== Charts ==
Chart (1993)	Peak Position
Australian Singles Chart	106
UK Singles Chart	34
