= Jean Racine (disambiguation) =

Jean Racine (1639–1699) was a French dramatist.

Jean Racine may also refer to:

- Jean-François Racine (born 1982), ice hockey goaltender
- Jean-Paul Racine (1928–1988), Canadian politician
- Jean Prahm (born 1978), formerly Jean Racine, bobsledder
