= The Partisans (band) =

Welsh punk rock band

- Origin: Bridgend, Wales, UK
- Genres: Punk rock; hardcore punk
- Years active: 1978–1984; late 1990s–present
- Members: Rob "Spike" Harrington; Andy Lealand; Magnus Neundorff; Charlie Claesson
- Past members: Phil Stanton; Mark "Shark" Harris; Mark "Savage" Parsons; Louise Wright; Dave Parsons; Mikael "Gustav" Gustavsson

The Partisans are a Welsh punk rock band formed in Bridgend, South Wales, in early 1978, when all four members were in their early teens. They continued until 1984, having several hits on the UK Indie Chart. The band re-formed in the late 1990s.

== History ==
The band formed in early 1978, with an original line-up of Phil Stanton (vocals), Rob "Spike" Harrington (guitar and vocals), Andy Lealand (guitar), Mark "Shark" Harris (drums), and Mark "Savage" Parsons (bass guitar). Parsons and Stanton left in 1979, with Harrington moving to lead vocals, and Lealand's girlfriend Louise Wright joining on bass.

Influenced by Sex Pistols, The Clash, and The Ramones, the band started off covering punk rock hits and soon started to compose their own material. They were the second band signed to Chris Berry's No Future Records label, and their debut release, the double A-sided "Police Story" / "Killing Machine" was released on 28 September 1981. It reached No. 5 on the UK Indie Chart, on the back of a tour with label-mates Blitz, and with strong support from Sounds writer Garry Bushell. Following the success of this single, The Partisans were included on the third volume of Bushell's Oi! compilation series Carry On Oi!, which reached No. 60 on the UK Albums Chart, and won the band gig slots with Blitz, Peter and the Test Tube Babies and The Ejected, as well as a 'No Future' night at London's Zig Zag Club with Red Alert, The Lombardos, and Peter and the Test Tube Babies.

The band released its second single, "17 Years of Hell", on 27 May 1982, peaking at No. 2 on the Indie Chart. This was followed by their self-titled debut LP, released in February 1983. It hit No. 5 in the Indie Chart and No. 1 in the Punk Chart, amid considerable critical acclaim from the national press and the underground fanzine culture.

After the departure of Louise Wright, the remaining members relocated to Bayswater in west London, with new bassist Dave Parsons to relaunch the band. Their next release was the three-track Blind Ambition EP on Cloak & Dagger Records, which peaked at No. 23 on the Indie Chart, and got played on BBC Radio 1. The LP, Time Was Right, followed in 1984, described as "The Professionals meets The Clash," and reaching No. 20 in the Indie Chart. The album featured live recordings from a gig at the Brixton Ace, at which The Partisans supported Anthrax, Lost Cherrees, Conflict and others.

The band split up in 1984. Dave Parsons later found chart success with Transvision Vamp and, even later, having global success with Bush. Lealand moved to Scandinavia. He and Harrington recorded one more session in late 1989 for Link Records under the name Agent Orange including Lealand's then partner Iggi. In the late 1990s, Lealand and Harrington reformed the band along with two of Lealand's Swedish friends, Magnus Neundorff and Mikael "Gustav" Gustavsson. The band signed to American label TKO who issued the "So Neat" single in 2001, followed by a new album in 2004, Idiot Nation on Dr. Strange.

In 2006, the band toured the UK with fellow Welsh hardcore punk band Picture Frame Seduction and played the Berlin festival Punk n' Disorderly in 2007. No further plans are being made to play live, although on 27 November 2015 they opened for Italian glam rock band, Giuda, at Orion, a rock venue in Ciampino, a small town near Rome. In 2024, the band opened for American experimental rock band The Garden at Heaven (nightclub) on June 25th and 26th for their European tour.

== Discography ==
Chart placings shown are from the UK Indie Chart, unless otherwise stated.

=== Albums ===
- The Partisans (1983), No Future - No. 5, UK Albums No. 94
- Time Was Right (1984), Link/Cloak and Dagger - No. 20
- The Best of the Partisans (1999), Captain Oi!
- Idiot Nation (2004), Dr. Strange

=== Singles ===
- "Police Story" (1981), No Future - No. 5
- "17 Years of Hell" (1982), No Future - No. 2
- "Blind Ambition" (1983), Link Records/Cloak and Dagger - No. 23
- "So Neat" (2001), TKO
