= Puppy Dog Tails =

Puppy Dog Tails may refer to:

- Dog tails
- A line of the poem, "What Are Little Boys Made Of?"
- And Puppy Dog Tails, a 1969 play by David Gaard which explored gay themes during the early gay liberation movement
- "Puppy Dog Tails", a 2005 season 1 episode of Life with Derek
- "Puppy Dog Tails", a B-side song to the Transvision Vamp single, "If Looks Could Kill"

== See also ==
- Rosie & Ruff in Puppydog Tales
