= Number One (Racine album) =

2004 debut studio album by Racine

Studio album by Racine
- Released: 28 September 2004
- Genres: Indie rock; electronic; pop rock; minimalistic
- Length: 43:20
- Label: Pia-K Recordings
- Producer: Wendy James

Racine chronology
| Number One (2004) | Racine 2 (2007) |

Singles from Number One
- 1. "Grease Monkey" Released: March 2005

Number One is the debut studio album released by the indie rock band Racine. The band was fronted by Wendy James, who was notable for previously being the lead singer of the late 1980s pop/rock band Transvision Vamp.

After the disbandment of Transvision Vamp in the early 1990s, Wendy James ventured into a short lived solo career, culminating in the release of her debut album Now Ain't the Time for Your Tears in 1993. The album met with limited commercial success and James dropped out of the music scene until re-establishing herself as an independent artist with new band Racine. The band, fronted and nurtured by James, also consisted of Singh Birdsong on guitar and Ray Sullivan on drums.

Number One was released in late September 2004 and provided Wendy James with her first music release in over a decade. A single, "Grease Monkey", was released soon after.

== Track listing ==
All songs written and produced by Wendy James

1. "The Man" – 3:44
2. "Grease Monkey" – 2:59
3. "Princess Patience Blues" – 3:20
4. "Hip Hop 136" – 3:39
5. "W13th" – 4:45
6. "Blonde Mink Mimi" – 4:32
7. "Heavy Metal Dude" – 5:14
8. "That's the Breaks, Junior" – 3:36
9. "Cakewalk" – 4:20
10. "Life Goes On" – 4:42
11. "Deluxe" – 4:29
