= Little Magnets Versus the Bubble of Babble =

1991 studio album by Transvision Vamp

Studio album by Transvision Vamp
- Released: 1991
- Recorded: 1991
- Studio: Moody Studios, Acton, London; Mambo Club
- Genre: Pop rock, alternative rock
- Length: 43:23
- Label: MCA
- Producer: Duncan Bridgeman

Transvision Vamp chronology
The Complete 12"ers Collection Vol. 1 (1990)	Little Magnets Versus the Bubble of Babble (1991)	Mixes (1992)

Singles from Little Magnets Versus the Bubble of Babble
- 1. "(I Just Wanna) B with U" Released: 1991; 2. "If Looks Could Kill" Released: 1991

Professional ratings
Review scores
Source	Rating
AllMusic	4/5 stars
Entertainment Weekly	D−
Q	2/5 stars
Smash Hits	4/10
Vox	5/10

Little Magnets Versus the Bubble of Babble is the third and final album by the English pop rock band Transvision Vamp. The album was released in 1991, two years after their UK No. 1 album Velveteen.

This album did not get a UK release at the time due to disputes with their label. Little Magnets Versus the Bubble of Babble took on a more mellow sound, which was the reason that their record company at one stage refused to release it – it was eventually released in the US but not in the UK at the time. It was, however, released in Australia, where the band had enjoyed considerable success. The album peaked at No. 25 on the Australian Albums Chart. It was released in New Zealand where it reached No.14, and also released in Sweden, reaching No.27. Little Magnets Versus the Bubble of Babble produced a few singles, but before a UK release could be re-considered, Transvision Vamp broke up.

This was the only Transvision Vamp album to feature co-writing credits for Wendy James.

== Track listing ==
All songs by Nick Sayer, except where noted.

1. "(I Just Wanna) B with U" (James, Sayer) – 4:22
2. "Ain't No Rules" – 4:48
3. "If Looks Could Kill" – 4:12
4. "Every Little Thing" – 4:04
5. "Twangy Wigout" (Serge Gainsbourg, James, Sayer) – 4:15
6. "Don't Believe the Type" (James, Sayer) – 5:28
7. "Pressure Times" – 5:21
8. "Crawl Out Your Window" (Bob Dylan) – 3:34
9. "You Put a Spell on Me" – 4:24
10. "Back on My Knees Again" (James, Sayer) – 2:49

== Personnel ==
Transvision Vamp

- Wendy James – vocals
- Nick Christian Sayer – guitar
- Dave Parsons – bass
- Tex Axile – drums
- Willie Wilcox – drums

with:

- Jody Linscott – percussion
- Chyna Gordon – backing vocals

Technical

- Ben Barlow, Darren Allison – mix engineer
- Alan Moulder – mixing

== Charts ==
Chart performance for Little Magnets Versus the Bubble of Babble
Chart (1991)	Peak position
Australian Albums (ARIA)	25
Austrian Albums (Ö3 Austria)	30
New Zealand Albums (RMNZ)	14
Swedish Albums (Sverigetopplistan)	27
