= If Looks Could Kill (Transvision Vamp song) =

1991 single by Transvision Vamp

Single by Transvision Vamp

from the album Little Magnets Versus the Bubble of Babble
- B-side: "My Friend the Tom Cat"; "Puppy Dog Tails"
- Released: 10 June 1991
- Length: 4:14
- Label: MCA
- Songwriter: Nick Christian Sayer
- Producer: Duncan Bridgeman

Transvision Vamp singles chronology
"(I Just Wanna) B with U" (1991)	"If Looks Could Kill" (1991)

"If Looks Could Kill" is a song by the English alternative rock band Transvision Vamp. It was the second single taken from their third album, Little Magnets Versus the Bubble of Babble (1991), and served as the band's final single. Released on 10 June 1991, the song reached number 41 on the UK singles chart and number 38 in New Zealand.

== Critical reception ==
Upon the song's UK release, Jim Arundel of Melody Maker left an ironic review on the single by saying that "the thing that really spoils Transvision Vamp is... Wendy James". He continued: "This is a lovingly compiled record, a collage of stolen kisses. Every riff and device is lovigly placed. It's full of secret passages. But then some pushy tart who can barely sing and sounds transparently insincere comes and sits on its face." Arundel finalized, "Still, if they're your cup of meat then this is probably their masterpiece."

== Track listings ==
7-inch and cassette single

1. "If Looks Could Kill"
2. "My Friend the Tom Cat"
3. "Puppy Dog Tails"

12-inch single

A1. "If Looks Could Kill" (Voodoo Hipster mix)
B1. "My Friend the Tom Cat"
B2. "Puppy Dog Tails"
B3. "I Want Your Love" (live)

CD single

1. "If Looks Could Kill" (7-inch version)
2. "My Friend the Tom Cat"
3. "Puppy Dog Tails"
4. "Tell That Girl to Shut Up" (live)

US 12-inch single

A1. "If Looks Could Kill" (Voodoo Hipster mix)
A2. "If Looks Could Kill" (LP version)
B1. "Twangy Wigout" (12-inch mix)
B2. "My Friend the Tom Cat"
B3. "Puppy Dog Tails"

== Charts ==
Weekly chart performance for "If Looks Could Kill"
Chart (1991)	Peak position
Australia (ARIA)	56
New Zealand (Recorded Music NZ)	38
UK Singles (Official Charts)	41

== Release history ==
Release dates and formats for "If Looks Could Kill"
Region	Date	Format(s)	Label(s)	Ref.
United Kingdom	10 June 1991	7-inch vinyl; 12-inch vinyl; CD	MCA	
Australia	15 July 1991	7-inch vinyl; cassette	MCA	
Australia	2 September 1991	12-inch vinyl	MCA	
