= Racines =

Racines may refer to:

- Racines, the Italian name for Ratschings, in South Tyrol, Italy
- Racines, Aube, a commune in the department of Aube, France
- Racines, an album by Matt Houston

== See also ==
- Racine (disambiguation)
