= Pop Art (album) =

1988 debut studio album by Transvision Vamp

Studio album by Transvision Vamp
- Released: 3 October 1988
- Recorded: 1988
- Studios: Garden (London); Eastcote (Kensal Road, London); Matrix (London)
- Genre: Pop rock
- Length: 42:20
- Label: MCA
- Producers: Duncan Bridgeman; Zeus B. Held

Transvision Vamp chronology
Pop Art (1988)	Velveteen (1989)

Singles from Pop Art
- 1. "Revolution Baby" Released: 24 August 1987; 2. "Tell That Girl to Shut Up" Released: March 1988; 3. "I Want Your Love" Released: 6 June 1988; 4. "Revolution Baby" Released: September 1988 (re-issue); 5. "Sister Moon" Released: 7 November 1988

Pop Art is the debut studio album by the English pop rock band Transvision Vamp, released on 3 October 1988 by MCA Records. The album reached No. 4 in the UK, and peaked at No. 13 in Australia, where it was the 25th highest-selling album of 1989, and features the band's first top ten hit "I Want Your Love".

== Critical reception ==
Professional ratings
Review scores
Source	Rating
AllMusic	2.5/5 stars
NME	6/10
Number One	1/5 stars
The Philadelphia Inquirer	1/4 stars
The Village Voice	B

NME reviewer Stuart Bailie stated that Transvision Vamp "write some very assured singalongs, and have a smart sense of melody", but was disappointed by Pop Art, finding that it lacked the "haughty thrust" of the band's debut single "Revolution Baby". In Number One, Patsy Kensit called the group "a band known more for their big mouths than their music" and commented, "what a shame after all their rantings they have come up with a package that is so astoundingly average." The magazine later listed Pop Art – alongside the album Fearless by Kensit's band Eighth Wonder, in a section titled "Silly Blondes" – as one of the year's "stinkers". The Philadelphia Inquirer's Tom Moon concluded that "every lyric shoots for free-associative significance, and eventually all it adds up to is a glossy empty set."

Robert Christgau was more complimentary in The Village Voice, suggesting that Transvision Vamp had been criticised for simply "wearing their inauthenticity on their sleeves", while advising them to improve their "command of trash – better riffs are available for hijacking."

== Track listing ==
All tracks are written by Nick Christian Sayer, except where noted.

No.	Title	Writer(s)	Length
1.	"Trash City"		5:09
2.	"I Want Your Love"		3:29
3.	"Sister Moon"		4:23
4.	"Psychosonic Cindy"		3:47
5.	"Revolution Baby"		4:53
6.	"Tell That Girl to Shut Up"	Holly Beth Vincent	3:06
7.	"Wild Star"		3:23
8.	"Hanging Out with Halo Jones"		4:37
9.	"Andy Warhol's Dead"		3:50
10.	"Sex Kick"		5:42
Total length:			42:20

== Personnel ==
Transvision Vamp

- Wendy James – vocals
- Nick Christian Sayer – guitar
- Dave Parsons – bass guitar, backing vocals
- Tex Axile – keyboards, sequencer
- Pol Burton – drums

Additional musicians

- Matthew Seligman – bass guitar
- Phil Smith – saxophone
- D. Manic B'Man – keyboards, programming
- Adam Peters – electric and acoustic cellos
- Nick Marsh – backing vocals
- China Blue – backing vocals
- Carol – backing vocals
- Karen – backing vocals

Production

- Duncan Bridgeman – production
- Zeus B. Held – mixing, additional production
- Adam Moseley – recording engineer
- Philip Bagenal – mix engineer
- Peter Ashworth – photography

== Charts ==
Chart performance for Pop Art
Chart (1988)	Peak position
Australian Albums (ARIA)	13
New Zealand Albums (RMNZ)	50
Swedish Albums (Sverigetopplistan)	25
Swiss Albums (Swiss Hitparade)	20
UK Albums (OCC)	4
US Billboard 200	115

== Certifications ==
Certifications for Pop Art
Region	Certification	Certified units/sales
Australia (ARIA)	Platinum	70,000^{^}
United Kingdom (BPI)	Gold	100,000^{^}
^{^} Shipments figures based on certification alone.
