= Revolution Baby =

- 1988 re-issue cover

Single by Transvision Vamp

from the album Pop Art
- B-side: "Vid Kid Vamp"; "Honey Honey"; "Long Lonely Weekend"
- Released: 24 August 1987; September 1988 (reissue)
- Recorded: 1987
- Genre: Pop rock
- Length: 4:00
- Label: MCA; TVV 1 / TVV 4
- Songwriter: Nick Christian Sayer
- Producer: Duncan Bridgeman

Transvision Vamp singles chronology
"Revolution Baby" (1987)	"Tell That Girl to Shut Up" (1988)

Alternative cover
- Original 1987 single release

"Revolution Baby" is the debut single by the English pop rock band Transvision Vamp, originally released on 24 August 1987 by MCA Records when it only managed to reach No. 77 on the UK singles chart. After the band's breakthrough in 1988 with the release of "I Want Your Love", "Revolution Baby" was subsequently reissued in September of that year, this time reaching No. 30 in the UK and No. 24 in Australia. The sleeve design differed radically between the 1987 and 1988 issues as did the track listings.

== Critical reception ==
Upon release, Chris Twomey of the British magazine Record Mirror reviewed the single positively and called it "sugar rock in the best bubblegum tradition". He wrote: "More glam than [Marc] Bolan, sexier than Westworld, and only S S Sputnik surpass them in the tacky imagery league. Transvision Vamp should be good for one hit, at least."

== Track listing ==
7" vinyl (1987) (TVV 1)

1. "Revolution Baby" – 4:00
2. "Vid Kid Vamp" – 2:58

12" vinyl (1987) (TVVT 1)

1. "Revolution Baby" (Electra-Glide Mix) – 6:02
2. "No It U Lover" – 3:06
3. "Vid Kid Vamp" – 2:58

7" vinyl (1988) (TVV 4 / TVVPR 4)

1. "Revolution Baby" – 4:00
2. "Honey Honey" (Dave Parsons) – 2:37
3. "Long Lonely Weekend" (Anthony Doughty) – 3:34
- A limited edition poster sleeve 7" was also released (TVVPR 4).

12" vinyl (1988) (TVVT 4 / TVVTP 4)

1. "Revolution Baby" (Electra-Glide Mix) – 6:02
2. "Honey Honey" – 2:37
3. "Long Lonely Weekend" – 3:34
- A limited edition 12" picture disc was also released (TVVTP 4).

CD single (1988) (DTVV 4)

1. "Revolution Baby" (Electra-Glide Mix) – 6:02
2. "Honey Honey" – 2:37
3. "Vid Kid Vamp" – 3:02 *
4. "Long Lonely Weekend" – 3:34
- * "Vid Kid Vamp" was remixed from the original B-side version.

== Charts ==
Chart performance for "Revolution Baby"
Chart (1988)	Peak position
Australia (ARIA)	24
New Zealand (Recorded Music NZ)	37
UK Singles (OCC)	30
