= London's Brilliant Parade =

1994 song by Elvis Costello

Single by Elvis Costello

from the album Brutal Youth
- Released: 11 November 1994
- Studio: Olympic, London
- Length: 4:22
- Label: Warner Bros.
- Songwriter(s): Elvis Costello
- Producer(s): Mitchell Froom

Elvis Costello singles chronology
"You Tripped at Every Step" (1994)	"London's Brilliant Parade" (1994)	"It's Time" (1996)

"London's Brilliant Parade" is a song written and performed by new wave musician Elvis Costello that was first released on his 1994 album Brutal Youth. Written as a reflection on Costello's birth city of London, the song features lyrics based on his recollection of London during the 1960s as well as music inspired by the Kinks. The song was one of those on the album that featured Costello performing with his longtime backing band the Attractions, who reunited during the course of the album's recording. As such, Costello singled out the song as an instance of the band's ability to perform sophisticatedly.

"London's Brilliant Parade" was, at Costello's insistence, released as the fourth and final single from Brutal Youth in 1994. The song's tender melody and nostalgic lyrics garnered the song critical acclaim and the song has since appeared on Costello compilation albums.

== Background and lyrics ==
Elvis Costello wrote "London's Brilliant Parade" as a tribute to his birth city of London, despite feeling more connected to his Merseyside heritage. He explained, "That song is probably as close as I'll ever get to writing a sentimental song about the town I was born in, even though I've never really regarded it as my hometown. But some places have a special personal significance for me." He wrote the song while living in Dublin; he reflected, "Maybe it's the old thing of leaving the town to see it. When I was there constantly, perhaps it was all too on top of me to see the difference. When I sat at the piano to write it, it all became clear, like a story I'd seen go past myself without really recognising it."

Costello specified that the song was a reflection on the London of his childhood, as opposed to London of the present: "It isn't the then of when I started. It's the then of the Sixties, that illusionary London." He commented on modern London in 1994, "It's running down. That's what the song's trying to capture. But it's a sort of melancholy feeling. Because I'm not there and it's not affecting me, it's not like I really want to criticise it in a damning way. The feeling is ambivalent. In the song, it's 'Just look at me, I'm having the time of my life'. Some of the time when I sing it, I mean it. Some of the time, it's obviously tongue-in-cheek. It isn't an absolute judgement, the definitive word on London." However, Costello also noted that he sought not to make the song into a direct critique of London's current state—"I didn't want it to be a pious 'Oh, the poor people on the street' song. Because, heaven knows, there are so many more talented commentators when it comes to that subject, like Phil Collins, doing it for me. ... I think anyone with any intelligence knows about homelessness. Me saying it doesn't change the fact."

== Music and recording ==
Stylistically, Costello sought to make "London's Brilliant Parade" both a tribute to and parody of the Kinks, even using a Dobro guitar on the track as a nod to Ray Davies using one on "Lola". Further, Costello noted the song as one of those on the album that continued the musical sophistication and atypical song structure he had learned from the Brodsky Quartet when they collaborated on 1993's The Juliet Letters.

"London's Brilliant Parade" was one of the five songs on Brutal Youth that featured the full Attractions lineup. While former Costello producer Nick Lowe performed bass on much of the album, he decided not to play on some of the more complex compositions. Costello explained, "There were other songs like 'London's Brilliant Parade', 'This Is Hell' and 'You Tripped At Every Step' that have a bit more architecture and Nick said 'these aren't my speed'." Costello praised the band's performance as "excellent" in the liner notes for the album, noting, "Handing the song over for Steve Nieve to play meant that it could be realised beyond my extreme limitations at the piano."

== Release ==
In addition to appearing on the album, "London's Brilliant Parade" was released as the fourth and final single from Brutal Youth in November 1994. Though the previous singles from Brutal Youth had largely underperformed, Costello fought for the song to be released as a single, even if he did not believe it would be a commercial success. He explained,

I became convinced that "London's Brilliant Parade" should come out as a single, even if it wasn't a hit — much the same way that I wanted "Tramp The Dirt Down" to come out off Spike, and was stopped by the record company because of the politics of it. Certain songs should be singles just so they appear on the radio, however slight the probability that they'll sell. I no longer have any vanity about whether records chart. The days of our consistent chart presence are long gone.

The single was a moderate chart hit, reaching number 48 in the UK. It has since also appeared on compilation albums such as 1997's Extreme Honey and 2015's Unfaithful Music & Disappearing Ink, the latter of which served as a companion disc to Costello's autobiography of the same name.

== Critical reception ==
"London's Brilliant Parade" saw positive reception from music writers upon its release. The Orange County Register called the song "beautiful", praising its "delicate instrumentation and warm, gentle vocals." Pulse! was similarly effusive, writing, "Who else could have written the melody that effortlessly bounds into the title phrase of 'London's Brilliant Parade'? Costello's voice is astonishing as he threads extended phrases of difficult intervals." The New York Times wrote, "'London's Brilliant Parade' crosses a whimsical Kinks song like 'Waterloo Sunset' with some Beatle-y psychedelia, as Mr. Costello offers a rambling, impressionistic walking tour of London." More ambivalently, the New Musical Express wrote, "Can't say I like it, but you can't fail to admire the way it's put together — a bit like Tony Adams' thighs."

Retrospective writers have been similarly positive. Anthony Breznican of Entertainment Weekly wrote, "'London's Brilliant Parade' is a nostalgic, dream-fueled stroll through Costello’s hometown, one that was far from my own of New Kensington. But in his bridges and struggling streets, there was a reflection I recognized." David Gorman of Trunkworthy, meanwhile, wrote, "It's Costello’s own 'Penny Lane,' complete with nostalgic sound effects and a breezy music-hall melody worthy of McCartney himself."

== Charts ==
Chart (1994)	Peak position
UK Singles (OCC)	48
