= Baby I Don't Care =

1989 single by Transvision Vamp

Single by Transvision Vamp

from the album Velveteen
- B-side: "Time for a Change"; "Strings of My Heart"
- Released: 20 March 1989
- Length: 3:57
- Label: MCA
- Songwriter: Nick Christian Sayer
- Producer: Duncan Bridgeman

Transvision Vamp singles chronology
"Sister Moon" (1988)	"Baby I Don't Care" (1989)	"Landslide of Love" (1989)

Official audio
- "Baby I Don't Care" on YouTube

"Baby I Don't Care" is a song by the English pop rock band Transvision Vamp, released on 20 March 1989 by MCA Records as the first single from their second studio album, Velveteen (1989). It remains their highest-charting single, peaking at No. 3 in both the United Kingdom and Australia. It was ranked at No. 25 on the Australian end-of-year chart for 1989. The song was later featured as the title-track on the band's budget compilation album, Baby I Don't Care (2002).

== Critical reception ==
Professional ratings
Review scores
Source	Rating
Number One	3/5 stars

Jerry Smith, reviewer of the British music newspaper Music Week, named this track as "another excellent slice of cartoon pop". He found song "very catchy" and expressed opinion that it "will put them back on top". James Brown of New Musical Express noted consistency of quality of a string of band's hits. Music & Media called song a "pure pop in the post-Blondie/Bangles sense" and praised catchy chorus.

== Track listings ==
All tracks were written by Nick Christian Sayer, except where noted.

7-inch and cassette single; Japanese mini-CD single

1. "Baby I Don't Care" – 3:57
2. "Time for a Change" (Anthony Doughty) – 3:34
3. "Strings of My Heart" (Dave Parsons) – 3:12

12-inch single

A1. "Baby I Don't Care" (Abigail's party mix) – 5:45
B1. "Sex Kick" (demo version) – 5:53
B2. "Time for Change" – 3:34
B3. "Strings of My Heart" – 3:12

CD and German mini-CD single

1. "Baby I Don't Care" – 3:59
2. "Saturn 5" (demo version) – 3:48
3. "Time for Change" – 3:31
4. "Strings of My Heart" – 3:14

US cassette single

A. "Baby I Don't Care"
B. "Time for a Change"

== Charts ==
=== Weekly charts ===
Chart (1989)	Peak position
Australia (ARIA)	3
Denmark (Hitlisten)	7
Europe (Eurochart Hot 100)	9
Finland (Suomen virallinen lista)	18
Ireland (IRMA)	6
Italy Airplay (Music & Media)	5
New Zealand (Recorded Music NZ)	29
UK Singles (Official Charts)	3

=== Year-end charts ===
Chart (1989)	Position
Australia (ARIA)	25
UK Singles (OCC)	49

== Certifications ==
Region	Certification	Certified units/sales
Australia (ARIA)	Gold	35,000^{^}
^{^} Shipments figures based on certification alone.

== Jennifer Ellison version ==
"Baby I Don't Care"

Single by Jennifer Ellison
- B-side: "Silent Footsteps"
- Released: 16 June 2003
- Length: 3:39
- Label: East West
- Songwriter: Nick Christian Sayer
- Producers: Bill Padley; Jem Godfrey

Jennifer Ellison singles chronology
"Baby I Don't Care" (2003)	"Bye Bye Boy" (2004)

In June 2003, the English actress, television personality and singer Jennifer Ellison covered the song, reaching No. 6 on the UK singles chart and No. 14 on the Irish Singles Chart with it.

UK CD1

1. "Baby I Don't Care" (radio edit) – 3:39
2. "Silent Footsteps" – 4:06
3. "Baby I Don't Care" (video) – 3:41

UK CD2

1. "Baby I Don't Care" (radio edit) – 3:39
2. "Baby I Don't Care" (Graham Stack / Groove Brothers remix) – 3:29
3. "Baby I Don't Care" (video—karaoke version) – 3:41

UK cassette single

1. "Baby I Don't Care" (radio edit) – 3:39
2. "Silent Footsteps" – 4:06
3. "Baby I Don't Care" (Graham Stack / Groove Brothers remix) – 3:29

=== Charts ===
==== Weekly charts ====
Chart (2003)	Peak position
Europe (Eurochart Hot 100)	24
Ireland (IRMA)	14
Scottish Singles Sales (Official Charts)	3
UK Singles (Official Charts)	6

==== Year-end charts ====
Chart (2003)	Position
UK Singles (OCC)	137
