= Born to Be Sold =

Single by Transvision Vamp

from the album Velveteen
- B-side: "Down on You" (live version); "Last Time" (live version)
- Released: 23 October 1989 (UK); 29 January 1990 (Australia)
- Recorded: 1989
- Genre: Pop rock
- Length: 3:45
- Label: MCA; TVV9
- Songwriter: Nick Christian Sayer
- Producer: Duncan Bridgeman

Transvision Vamp singles chronology
"The Only One" (1989)	"Born to Be Sold" (1989)	"(I Just Wanna) B with U" (1991)

"Born to Be Sold" is a song by the English pop rock band Transvision Vamp, released on 23 October 1989 by MCA Records as the fourth and final single from their second studio album Velveteen. It became a hit in late 1989, peaking at No. 22 on the UK singles chart.

== Critical reception ==
Members of the pop band Swing Out Sister left an ironic review of this single for the British music newspaper Record Mirror. As per Andy Connell the song is "a dictionary of every rock'n'roll cliché" that readers "ever heard". But it is "resounding hit nevertheless".

== Track listing ==
All tracks are written by Nick Christian Sayer, except where noted.

7" vinyl and cassette single (TVV9) / (TVVC9)

1. "Born to Be Sold" – 3:45
2. "Down on You" (live version) – 4:31
3. "Last Time" (live version) (Mick Jagger, Keith Richards) – 5:18

CD single and 12" vinyl (TVVT9) / (DTVVT9)

1. "Born to Be Sold" (7" version) – 3:45
2. "Kiss Me" (Anthony Doughty) – 2:00
3. "Down on You" (live version) – 4:31
4. "Last Time" (live version) – 5:18

== Charts ==
Chart (1989)	Peak position
Irish Singles Chart	12
UK singles chart	22
Chart (1990)	Peak position
Australian ARIA Singles Chart	108
