= A Drunken Man's Praise of Sobriety =

Poem by William Butler Yeats

"A Drunken Man's Praise of Sobriety" is a poem written by the Irish poet William Butler Yeats, first published in his 1938 collection New Poems. The poem begins with the lines:

Come swish around, my pretty punk,
And keep me dancing still
That I may stay a sober man
Although I drink my fill.

== Cultural influences ==
The poem is set to music by Elvis Costello and is featured in the bonus disc of the album Brutal Youth.
