= Racine (Casablanca) =

Racine is a quartier of Casablanca, Morocco.
