= Do You Know What I'm Saying? =

1993 single by Wendy James

Single by Wendy James

from the album Now Ain't the Time for Your Tears
- B-side: "I Started the Lie"; "The Reigning Beauty Queen"; "The Whole Damn Thing"; "Sugar Takes Her Coffee Black"
- Released: 7 June 1993
- Recorded: United Kingdom
- Genre: Soft rock
- Length: 5:22; 4:37 (edit)
- Label: MCA
- Songwriter: Elvis Costello
- Producer: Chris Kimsey

Wendy James singles chronology
"London's Brilliant" (1993)	"Do You Know What I'm Saying?" (1993)

"Do You Know What I'm Saying?" is the third and final single released from the English singer-songwriter Wendy James' debut solo studio album, Now Ain't the Time for Your Tears (1993). The single was released in June 1993 by MCA Records and was written by Elvis Costello.

Of the collection of songs Costello gave to James for her album, she singled out "Do You Know What I'm Saying?" as her personal favorite.

== Critical reception ==
Upon its release as a single, Terry Staunton of NME noted that the original version of "Do You Know What I'm Saying?" from Now Ain't the Time for Your Tears is a "spare little Brechtian ballad reminiscent of Broken English-period Marianne Faithfull", whereas the single version "comes across like Elaine Paige". He concluded that the release was "decidedly unlikely to make her the star she so desperately wants to be". He added that the James-penned B-side "Sugar Takes Her Coffee Black" is "much better", describing it as a "charming acoustic strummer which may well be about Wendy herself".

== Music video ==
The music video for "Do You Know What I'm Saying?" was directed by British director Marcus Adams and produced by Frank Hilton for Gravity Films. It was released on 1 June 1993 and is derived from the opening shot of Cabaret.

== Track listings ==
- CD single part 1
1. "Do You Know What I'm Saying?" – 5:22
2. "I Started the Lie" – 4:49 (Wendy James/Neil Taylor)
3. "The Reigning Beauty Queen" – 4:44 (James/Taylor)
- CD single part 2'
1. "Do You Know What I'm Saying?" – 5:22
2. "The Whole Damn Thing" – 4:45
3. "Sugar Takes Her Coffee Black" – 4:05
- CD maxi-single
1. "Do You Know What I'm Saying?" – 4:37
2. "To All Beginnings" – 4:24
3. "Never a Stranger" – 3:37

== Charts ==
Chart (1993)	Peak Position
Australia (ARIA)	230
UK Singles (OCC)	78
