= Velveteen (album) =

1989 studio album by Transvision Vamp

Studio album by Transvision Vamp
- Released: June 1989
- Recorded: 1989
- Studios: Moody (Acton, London); Eastcote (Kensal Road, London); Townhouse (London)
- Genres: Pop rock; bubblegum
- Length: 50:10
- Label: MCA
- Producers: Duncan Bridgeman; Zeus B. Held

Transvision Vamp chronology
Pop Art (1988)	Velveteen (1989)	The Complete 12″ers Collection Vol. 1 (1990)

Singles from Velveteen
- 1. "Baby I Don't Care" Released: 20 March 1989; 2. "Landslide of Love" Released: 24 July 1989; 3. "The Only One" Released: 28 August 1989; 4. "Born to Be Sold" Released: 23 October 1989

Velveteen is the second studio album by the English pop rock band Transvision Vamp, released in June 1989 by MCA Records. The album includes the single "Baby I Don't Care", which reached No. 3 in the United Kingdom and Australia. Velveteen reached number-one on the UK Albums Chart and No. 2 in Australia, where it became the 39th best-selling album of the year.

An accompanying video album, titled The Velveteen Singles, features the music videos for all four singles released from the album, as well as behind-the-scenes footage.

== Critical reception ==
Professional ratings
Review scores
Source	Rating
AllMusic	4/5 stars
Chicago Tribune	3/4 stars
Hi-Fi News & Record Review	A:1
NME	3/10
Number One	4.5/5 stars
Record Mirror	4/5
The Village Voice	B+

Hi-Fi News & Record Review praised Velveteen as "some of the best pure pop of any type in the UK today", while David Martin of Number One declared it "the best album of the year" and Transvision Vamp as "one of our most precocious young bands". Music Week reviewer Jeff Clark-Meads found the band more successful with "fast and loud" material, while noting that "there are enough tracks here with pace and raunch to carry the casual listener through the slower, limits-of-ability-defining tracks", and summarising: "Indeed, as a package the album has life, verve and muscle and will appeal to anybody who finds the band's singles attractive." David Quantick, however, panned Velveteen in NME as "a heartless, brainless rummage through pop music's pockets", accusing Transvision Vamp of lacking "imagination, wit, or fun."

In the United States, Chicago Tribune critic Tom Popson wrote that "the vocal dipsy-doodle edges into overkill more than once, but just as often the band delivers arresting moments of fast-paced, trashy-toned music." The Village Voice's Robert Christgau commented that lead singer Wendy James "does love-versus-sex and tragedy-of-fame almost as good as Patti [Smith] now" and "should create enduring art for the next two–three years or as long as her attitude holds, whichever comes first."

== Track listing ==
All tracks are written by Nick Christian Sayer, except where noted.

No.	Title	Writer(s)	Length
1.	"Baby I Don't Care"		4:37
2.	"The Only One"		4:19
3.	"Landslide of Love"		3:48
4.	"Falling for a Goldmine"		4:28
5.	"Down on You"	Sayer; Marcus Myers	4:20
6.	"Song to the Stars"		1:50
7.	"Kiss Their Sons"		4:16
8.	"Born to Be Sold"		3:44
9.	"Pay the Ghosts"		4:37
10.	"Bad Valentine"		3:45
11.	"Velveteen"		9:51
Total length:			50:10

== Personnel ==
Transvision Vamp

- Wendy James – vocals
- Nick Christian Sayer – guitar
- Dave Parsons – bass guitar
- Tex Axile – keyboards
- Kevin Armstrong – guitar

with:

- Richard Niles – string arrangements on "Landslide of Love" and "Velveteen"

Technical

- Ben Kape – engineer
- Philip Bagenal – engineer
- Peter Ashworth – photography

== Charts ==
=== Weekly charts ===
Weekly chart performance for Velveteen
Chart (1989)	Peak position
Australian Albums (ARIA)	2
European Albums (Music & Media)	10
Finnish Albums (Suomen virallinen lista)	6
German Albums (Offizielle Top 100)	25
New Zealand Albums (RMNZ)	12
Norwegian Albums (VG-lista)	20
Swedish Albums (Sverigetopplistan)	37
Swiss Albums (Schweizer Hitparade)	16
UK Albums (Official Charts)	1

=== Year-end charts ===
Year-end chart performance for Velveteen
Chart (1989)	Position
Australian Albums (ARIA)	39
European Albums (Music & Media)	77
UK Albums (Gallup)	31
