= Jean-François Racine =

Canadian ice hockey player

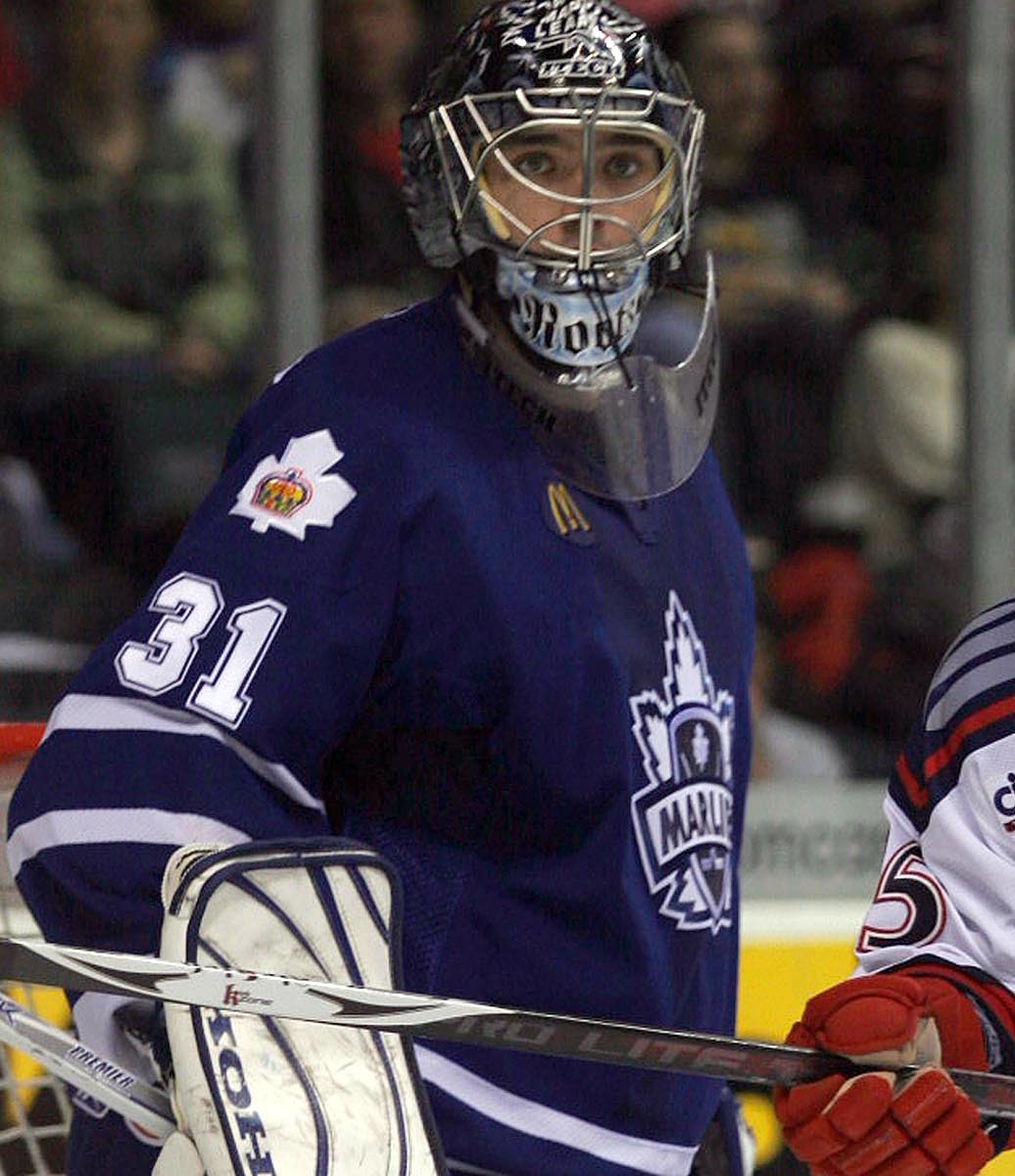
- Racine with the Toronto Marlies in 2007
- Born: April 27, 1982 (age 44) Roxton Falls, Quebec, Canada
- Height: 6 ft 3 in (191 cm)
- Weight: 191 lb (87 kg; 13 st 9 lb)
- Played for: Memphis RiverKings; St. John's Maple Leafs; Toronto Marlies; Sherbrooke Saint-François; Sorel-Tracy Carvena
- NHL draft: 90th overall, 2000; Toronto Maple Leafs
- Playing career: 2002–2012

Jean-François Racine (born April 27, 1982) is a Canadian former professional ice hockey goaltender.

== Early life ==
Born in Roxton Falls, Quebec, Canada, Racine played junior hockey for the Drummondville Voltigeurs from 1999 until 2002.

== Career ==
After his first season of junior, Racine was selected 90th overall by the Toronto Maple Leafs of the National Hockey League (NHL) in the third round of the 2000 NHL entry draft. He turned professional with the Memphis RiverKings of the Central Hockey League in the 2002–03 season. In 2003–04, he moved up to the St. John's Maple Leafs of the American Hockey League, the top Maple Leafs affiliate. Racine stayed with the team when the St. John's team moved to Toronto to play for the Toronto Marlies.

Originally sharing the starting role with the Marlies with Tellqvist, the departure of Trevor Kidd as the prime back-up spot on the Leafs earned Tellqvist a promotion, with Racine earning the starting spot. The signing of Jean-Sébastien Aubin to the club, however, led to the two splitting the games 50/50. With the groin injury of Ed Belfour on December 12, 2005, Aubin was recalled to back up Tellqvist. Racine continued with the Marlies until 2007 when he joined Sherbrooke Saint-François of the Ligue Nord-Américaine de Hockey.
