= Now Ain't the Time for Your Tears =

1993 debut solo album by Wendy James

Studio album by Wendy James
- Released: 8 March 1993
- Studios: Polygone (Blagnac, Toulouse); Metropolis (Chiswick, London)
- Genres: Pop rock; alternative rock; pop punk
- Length: 36:22
- Label: MCA
- Producer: Chris Kimsey

Wendy James chronology
Now Ain't the Time for Your Tears (1993)	I Came Here to Blow Minds (2011)

Singles from Now Ain't the Time for Your Tears
- 1. "The Nameless One" Released: 8 February 1993; 2. "London's Brilliant" Released: 5 April 1993; 3. "Do You Know What I'm Saying?" Released: 7 June 1993

Now Ain't the Time for Your Tears is the debut solo studio album by the English singer-songwriter Wendy James, released on 8 March 1993 by MCA Records. It was her first solo work after the breakup of her band Transvison Vamp and contains songs written by Elvis Costello.

== Background ==
The album was conceived after Wendy James had a chance meeting with Pete Thomas, drummer for Elvis Costello's backing band the Attractions, during her final tour with her band Transvision Vamp. After asking Thomas if Costello might be able to help her with guidance or advice for a possible solo career, Thomas suggested she contact Costello. The album was then written in its entirety, in one weekend, by Costello, with several tracks co-written by his then-wife, Cait O'Riordan. James told Melody Maker in 1993, "I sketched a letter to Elvis, reasonably long and philosophical, and sent it off, thinking nothing would ever come of this, it's a ridiculous idea. I didn't hear anything for a while and then Elvis's publisher rang up and said, 'He's written you an entire album, and if you like it, it's yours'. I was astounded. It's like, imagine if your favourite artist or performer of all time has just written you, personally you, your very own album."

James received a cassette of basic demo recordings and a lyric sheet from Costello in December 1991 and she recorded the material in June 1992. James briefly met Costello at a party after U2's Earl's Court concert on 31 May 1992. Now Ain't the Time for Your Tears was released by MCA, Transvision Vamp's former label, which James signed with as a top priority solo act.

Speaking of the album's material, James told NME, "Elvis is a man with a tremendous amount of insight. I'd only met him once, but he seemed to understand perfectly everything I had gone through. Some of it is pure storytelling, but overall it's an almost conceptual album which traces the successes and failures of my own career." She added to Melody Maker, "All of the songs, from the melancholy songs to the glory glory hallelujah songs, are rather cynical. And there isn't a moment on the album where you can get away with anything, because you're being asked to look at yourself in a very hard-hearted manner every step of the way. There are many times when it's cutting someone's ego, whether it's mine as the singer, or someone else's."

The album's title comes from a line in the chorus of Bob Dylan's song "The Lonesome Death of Hattie Carroll". James chose the title as it was a bit of advice she gave herself.

== Reception ==
Professional ratings
Review scores
Source	Rating
AllMusic	3/5 stars
Christgau's Consumer Guide	(choice cut)
Los Angeles Times	3/4 stars
NME	5/10
Q	4/5 stars
Select	3/5

Now Ain't the Time for Your Tears was relatively unsuccessful, only peaking at No. 43 on the UK Albums Chart. The singles released from the album also met with moderate to minor success, with "The Nameless One" and "London's Brilliant" peaking on the UK Singles Chart at Nos. 34 and 62, respectively. In 1994, Costello's demos for "Puppet Girl", "Basement Kiss" and "We Despise You" were released on his "13 Steps Lead Down" EP.

Upon its release, Siân Pattenden of NME gave a mixed review. She described the album as "fairly proficient, but, more importantly ... dull", and said that "the only excuse one can make for this sniffle of an album" is that it shows "Costello has a sense of humour". Pattenden added, "It's all about Wendy and her World, which is not enough for ten songs. Wendy has only two emotions: 'irritated' and 'angry'. Unfortunately, she only has one singing style, which seems to be 'trying to resist the urge to shout'." Ira Robbins of Rolling Stone was also critical, calling Costello's songs "certainly worth listening to" while opining that James "does them no justice."

== Track listing ==
All songs by Elvis Costello, except where noted.

1. "This Is a Test" – 1:58
2. "London's Brilliant" (Costello, Cait O'Riordan) – 2:29
3. "Basement Kiss" (Costello, O'Riordan) – 4:03
4. "Puppet Girl" (Costello, O'Riordan) – 2:48
5. "Earthbound" (Costello, O'Riordan) – 4:32
6. "Do You Know What I'm Saying?" – 5:16
7. "We Despise You" (Costello, O'Riordan) – 3:21
8. "Fill in the Blanks" – 3:14
9. "The Nameless One" – 5:30
10. "I Want to Stand Forever" – 4:31

== Personnel ==
- Wendy James – lead vocals

Additional musicians

- Pete Thomas – drums, percussion; backing vocals (track 8)
- Richard "Cass" Lewis – bass guitar; backing vocals (track 8)
- Neil Taylor – guitars; backing vocals (track 8)
- Andy Bown – organ
- Jon Astley – piano
- Ian Wilson – backing vocals
- Steve Butler – backing vocals
- Jeff Young – backing vocals (track 8)
- Chris Kimsey – backing vocals (track 8)

Technical

- Chris Kimsey – producer, engineer, mixing
- Jon Astley – orchestral arrangements
- Spencer May – assistant engineer
- Joël Theux – assistant engineer
- Boris Beziat – assistant engineer
- Steve Harrison – assistant engineer
- Chris Fogel – assistant engineer
- David Bailey – photography
- Ryan Art – design

== Charts ==
Chart (1993)	Peak position
Australian Albums (ARIA)	132
Swedish Albums (Sverigetopplistan)	42
UK Albums (Official Charts)	43
