= Transvision Vamp =

English alternative rock band

- Transvision Vamp in a promotional photo, 1991

Background information
- Origin: Ladbroke Grove, London, England
- Genres: Pop rock; alternative rock; new wave
- Years active: 1986–1992; 2025–present
- Labels: Uni; MCA
- Spinoffs: Bush
- Spinoff of: The Partisans
- Members: Wendy James; Dave Parsons; Alex Ward; Pip Stakem; Jim Sclavunos; Matt Millership
- Past members: Nick Christian Sayer; Anthony Doughty; Pol Burton; James Piper; Martin Hallett
- Website: thetransvisionvamp.com

Transvision Vamp are an English pop rock band, formed on Ladbroke Grove in London in 1986 by guitarist and principle songwriter Nick Christian Sayer and lead vocalist Wendy James. Popular during the late 1980s, the band had 10 hits on the UK singles charts and also enjoyed considerable success in Australia. Their biggest hits were "I Want Your Love" from their debut studio album Pop Art (1988) and "Baby I Don't Care" from their second studio album Velveteen (1989), which was their most successful album, reaching No. 1 in the UK and No. 2 in Australia. During this time, James attracted media attention with her sexually charged and rebellious image. The band broke up in 1992, and re-formed in 2025.

== Career ==
The band's original line-up was James, Sayer, Dave Parsons (bass guitar), Tex Axile (keyboards), and Pol Burton (drums). Sayer was originally in an early punk rock band formed in 1977 and based in Bexhill-on-Sea called the Plastics, later Plastix, whose founding members were Sayer, Michael Cook and Mark Storr Hoggins and they were later joined by Mark Wilmshurst. They played gigs in Hastings, Eastbourne, and Brighton as well as in London at The Roxy. When the Plastix split, Sayer and the drummer Storr Hoggins joined the Brighton band Midnight and the Lemon Boys, who supported U2 on their first UK tour in 1979. Parsons and Axile had also both been in punk rock bands before joining Transvision Vamp, Parsons in the Partisans and Axile in various bands, most notably the Moors Murderers and X-Ray Spex offshoot Agent Orange.

In December 1986, Transvision Vamp signed a recording contract with MCA Records, which released the band's first single, "Revolution Baby", the next year. It stalled at No. 77 in the UK in September 1987. A cover version of the Holly and the Italians' song "Tell That Girl to Shut Up" was released as the band's second single in March 1988, reaching No. 45 on the UK singles chart. The single became the band's only charting entry on the US Billboard Hot 100, where it peaked at No. 87.

Transvision Vamp's third single, "I Want Your Love", with its pop-punk crossover appeal, became the band's first major hit, topping the Norwegian singles chart and peaking within the top 10 in the UK, Ireland, Australia, New Zealand, Sweden, and Switzerland. The next single was a re-release of "Revolution Baby", which rose to No. 30 in the UK, 17 in Ireland, and 24 in both Australia and New Zealand. Their fourth single, "Sister Moon", narrowly missed the UK top 40 at No. 41.

In October 1988 the band released their debut studio album, Pop Art. It was a major success in the UK, where it stayed on the album chart for 32 weeks, peaking at No. 4. The album achieved similar success in Australia, where it was certified platinum and became the 25th-highest-selling album of 1989. The album also did well in Switzerland (No. 20) and Sweden (No. 25).

The 1989 releases of the single "Baby I Don't Care" and the album it was on made that year Transvision Vamp's most successful. The song peaked at No. 3 in both the UK and Australia; it was the band's highest-charting single in both countries. In Australia, the song spent 20 weeks in the top 50. The band's second studio album, Velveteen, was released shortly after, debuting atop the UK Albums Chart and remaining on it for 26 weeks. Velveteen also reached No. 2 on the Australian Albums Chart, spending 25 weeks in the top 100 and becoming the 39th-bestselling album of the year. Velveteen was also a significant success in New Zealand (reaching No. 12) and parts of Europe, including Switzerland, Germany, and Norway, where it entered the top 20. The other singles from Velveteen — "The Only One", "Landslide of Love" and "Born to Be Sold" — all peaked within the top 30 in the UK and the top 20 in Ireland.

In June 1991, MCA nixed a UK release of the band's third studio album, Little Magnets Versus the Bubble of Babble, reportedly because the label disliked the direction the music was taking, an evaluation it thought was justified after two singles from the new album did not do as well in the UK as their Velveteen ones. The album was, however, released in New Zealand, where it reached No. 14, and in Australia, where it peaked at No. 25 and spent three months on the ARIA top 100 albums chart. MCA also opted to release it in Sweden, where it reached No. 27. The album's first single, "(I Just Wanna) B with U", peaked at No. 16 in Australia, charted at No. 30 in the UK, and entered the Irish top 30. The second single, "If Looks Could Kill", entered the top 40 in New Zealand and just missed the UK top 40 at No. 41; it became the band's final single release. A third single from the album, "Twangy Wigout", was planned and promotional copies issued, but MCA shelved it after further disputes. Of the third studio album, Wendy James has stated that

It came out in America. But then we decided to split up, during which time the English record label had said they weren't convinced about this record, we're going to hold off on it and see how well it does in other countries first. By the time they were ready to release it [in the UK], we'd already decided to split up, and so it never came out.

Following a statement from MCA, Transvision Vamp officially broke-up in February 1992. In 1993 Wendy James launched her solo career with the Elvis Costello-written studio album Now Ain't the Time for Your Tears.

== Post-split activity and reunion ==
Anthony Doughty (Tex Axile) joined a band called Max, with Matthew Ashman, Kevin Mooney, John Reynolds and John Keogh in which he played keyboards. They released a Trevor Horn-produced studio album Silence Running in 1992. Keogh died soon after the release and Ashman a couple of years later. Doughty continues to release solo studio albums on his own label. Parsons, meanwhile, joined the post-grunge band Bush, who would achieve commercial success in the 1990s.

Wendy James embarked on a solo career, first with a collaboration with Elvis Costello with her debut studio album Now Ain't the Time for Your Tears (1993), which reached No. 43 on the UK Albums Chart. The lead single, "The Nameless One", No. 34 on the UK singles chart, while the second single, "London's Brilliant", peaked at only No. 62 while the third single, "Do You Know What I'm Saying?", reached No. 78 in the UK. MCA and James parted company in August of that same year. In 2004, James formed a band named Racine, with which she released two studio albums: Number One (2004), and Racine 2 (2007). A single, "Grease Monkey", charted at No. 114 in the UK in April 2005. Racine broke-up and closed down their official band website in December 2008.

In July 2025, James announced that she had reformed Transvision Vamp with a new line-up, including a returning Dave Parsons and two new members: Thurston Moore collaborator Alex Ward on guitar and Nick Cave and the Bad Seeds' drummer Jim Sclavunos. The band's co-founder and songwriter, Sayer, is not part of the new lineup.

At the end of the Bristol gig on 30th October 2026 Wendy stated that Transvision Vamp were not done and there would be a new Transvision Vamp album that would be released on 3 October 2028 timed to be the 40th anniversary of the release of Pop Art.

== Band members ==
Current members

- Wendy James – lead vocals (1986–1991, 2025–present)
- Dave Parsons – bass guitar, backing vocals (1986–1991, 2025–present)
- Alex Ward – guitar, backing vocals (2025–present)
- Pip Stakem – guitar, backing vocals (2025–present)
- Jim Sclavunos – drums (2025–present)
- Matt Millership – keyboards (2025–present)

Past members

- Nick Christian Sayer – guitar, backing vocals (1986–1991)
- Tex Axile – keyboards, sequencer, electronic drums, guitar, backing vocals (1986–1991)
- Pol Burton – drums (1986–1989)
- James "Jazz" Piper – guitar, backing vocals (1989–1991)
- Martin "Mallet" Hallett – drums, backing vocals (1989–1991)

== Discography ==
=== Studio albums ===
List of studio albums, with selected chart positions and certifications
Title	Details	Peak chart positions								Certifications
Title	Details	UK	AUS	GER	NOR	NZ	SWE	SWI	US	Certifications
Pop Art	Released: October 1988; Label: MCA; Format: CD, cassette, LP	4	13	—	—	50	25	20	115	BPI: Gold; ARIA: Platinum
Velveteen	Released: July 1989; Label: MCA; Format: CD, cassette, LP	1	2	25	20	12	37	16	—	BPI: Platinum; ARIA: Platinum
Little Magnets Versus the Bubble of Babble	Released: August 1991; Label: MCA; Format: CD, cassette	—	25	—	—	14	27	—	—	
"—" denotes releases that did not chart or were not released.

=== Compilations ===
List of Compilations, with selected details
Title	Details
The Complete 12″ers Collection Vol. 1	Released: 1990 (Japan only); Label: MCA Records; Format: CD
Mixes	Released: 1992 (Japan only); Label: MCA Records; Format: CD
Kiss Their Sons	Released: 1998 (UK only); Label: Universal; Format: CD, 2×CD
Baby I Don't Care	Released: 2002; Label: Spectrum Music; Format: CD
The 12" Singles	Released: May 2022; Label: Universal Music Catalogue; Format: digital
A's, B's & Rarities	Released: May 2022; Label: Universal Music Catalogue; Format: digital

=== Singles ===
List of singles, with selected chart positions
Title	Year	Peak chart positions										Album
Title	Year	UK	AUS	GER	IRE	NL	NOR	NZ	SWE	SWI	US	Album
"Revolution Baby"	1987	77	—	—	—	—	—	—	—	—	—	Pop Art
"Tell That Girl to Shut Up"	1988	45	44	—	—	—	—	—	—	—	87	Pop Art
"I Want Your Love"	1988	5	7	23	3	32	1	9	8	4	—	Pop Art
"Revolution Baby" (re-issue)	1988	30	24	—	17	—	—	37	—	—	—	Pop Art
"Sister Moon"	1988	41	95	—	—	—	—	—	—	—	—	Pop Art
"Baby I Don't Care"	1989	3	3	—	6	—	—	29	—	—	—	Velveteen
"The Only One"	1989	15	30	—	7	—	—	22	—	—	—	Velveteen
"Landslide of Love"	1989	14	70	—	8	—	—	—	—	—	—	Velveteen
"Born to Be Sold"	1989	22	108	—	12	—	—	—	—	—	—	Velveteen
"(I Just Wanna) B with U"	1991	30	16	—	30	—	—	—	—	—	—	Little Magnets Versus the Bubble of Babble
"If Looks Could Kill"	1991	41	56	—	—	—	—	38	—	—	—	Little Magnets Versus the Bubble of Babble
"—" denotes releases that did not chart or were not released.
