= Wendy James =

English singer and songwriter (born 1966)

- James performing live with Transvision Vamp at the O_{2} Ritz in Manchester, England, 2026

Background information
- Born: Wendy Patricia James; 21 January 1966 (age 60); London, England
- Genres: Pop-punk; pop rock; alternative rock; new wave
- Occupations: Singer; songwriter; record producer
- Instrument: Vocals
- Years active: 1986–present
- Labels: MCA; Cobraside Distribution Inc.
- Member of: Transvision Vamp; Racine
- Website: thewendyjames.com

Wendy Patricia James (born 21 January 1966) is an English singer and songwriter most notable as the lead vocalist of the pop rock band Transvision Vamp, and for her collaborations with Elvis Costello, James Williamson from Iggy Pop and the Stooges, Lenny Kaye from the Patti Smith Group and James Sclavunos from Nick Cave and the Bad Seeds. She has released ten studio albums between 1988 and 2024.

== Transvision Vamp ==
Wendy Patricia James was born on 21 January 1966 in London to a Norwegian mother and English father, James was adopted soon after birth. She left home at the age of 16, moving to the East Sussex seaside resort town of Brighton. There she met Nick Christian Sayer, who became her musical collaborator. Together Sayer and James moved to London and formed the pop-punk band Transvision Vamp, recruiting friends Dave Parsons and Anthony Doughty to complete the line-up. James was the lead vocalist and focal point of the band, and attracted media attention with her sexually charged and rebellious image.

The band signed a recording contract with MCA Records in December 1986 and released a cover version of the Holly and the Italians song "Tell That Girl to Shut Up" in late 1987. Months later the follow-up single "I Want Your Love", with its pop-punk crossover appeal, entered the top 10 of the UK singles chart. The band went on to release the hit album Pop Art in October. 1989 was the band's most successful year, with the No. 3 hit single "Baby I Don't Care" and hit album Velveteen which entered the UK Albums Chart at number-one and was a hit worldwide.

Little Magnets Versus the Bubble of Babble, the third and final studio album by Transvision Vamp, was released in 1991. The album, recorded after a break from touring to focus on songwriting, was cited by lead vocalist Wendy James as her personal favorite, particularly highlighting the track "If Looks Could Kill". Little Magnets Versus the Bubble of Babble was released internationally but remained available in the UK only as an import. Although it became the band's most successful release in the United States, ongoing tensions with the record label and exhaustion from years of touring, led James and Sayer to disband Transvision Vamp in San Francisco, California in 1992.

== Later career ==
=== Elvis Costello collaboration with Now Ain't the Time for Your Tears ===
When Transvision Vamp broke-up, James wrote to Elvis Costello asking for his guidance. In response Costello, collaborating with his then wife Cait O'Riordan on five of the ten songs, wrote a full album's worth of material for James. The cassette tape he recorded was waiting for her when she returned to London at the end of the tour. These songs made up the tracks on her debut solo studio album Now Ain't the Time for Your Tears (1993). Produced by the Rolling Stones' producer Chris Kimsey, it reached No. 43 on the UK Albums Chart in March 1993.

=== Number One and Racine 2 ===
In 2002 James moved to Manhattan, New York City, US and transformed her demo tape, written in London before she left, into her first release called Number One. James played all the instruments and recorded in Sonic Youth's studio in Hoboken, New Jersey. She played gigs with two local co-musicians Ray Sullivan aka Chip Striker on drums and Singh Birdsong on guitar. They played the Tribeca Grand Hotel in New York City and Madame Jojo's in Soho, London.

James followed up Number One in 2007 with Racine 2. The album was recorded in New Jersey at Water Studios with a full band consisting of Henrik Strahl on guitar, James Meynell on bass guitar and Chip Striker on drums. They toured extensively throughout Europe, Scandinavia and UK.

=== I Came Here to Blow Minds ===
A new studio album, entitled I Came Here to Blow Minds, was recorded in Paris, France in 2009 and mixed in Australia later that year. It was digitally released on 19 October 2010. One track from the album had already been made available for download on RCRD LBL in May 2009.

=== The Price of the Ticket ===
James released the studio album The Price of the Ticket on 19 February 2016. The album hit No. 15 on the UK Official Vinyl Albums Chart and 13 on the Independent Albums Chart. Two cover versions are included on the album; songs originally by Bob Dylan and Fred "Sonic" Smith, known for his work with MC5 and Sonic's Rendezvous Band.

The album was recorded in New York City, with Ivan Julian (Richard Hell and the Voidoids) serving as engineer. The core recording sessions featured live performances by Lenny Kaye, Glen Matlock, and Jim Sclavunos. Following the initial sessions, James relocated to Fantasy Studios in Berkeley, California, to complete the mixing process with engineer Jesse Nichols. Album artwork was photographed and designed by fashion designer Kym Ellery, a longtime collaborator of James.

=== Queen High Straight ===
In October 2019, James was touring as 'the Wendy James Band' in support of the Psychedelic Furs, promoting a new solo studio album, Queen High Straight. The album appeared on the UK indie chart at No. 16. The album's tour included a support slot with the Psychedelic Furs around the UK, and then a 32 date comprehensive tour of the UK. Recorded and mixed in the UK, the album was mastered in New York. It was released in 2020 on the Wendy James Label.

=== The Shape of History ===
On 25 October 2024 James released her latest studio album, The Shape of History, on the Wendy James Label. It was released in two vinyl formats – a wide spine cover double vinyl LP, consisting of one 12" vinyl and one 10" vinyl. The 12" plays at 33 1/3 RPM and the 10" plays at 45 RPM.

James described the album as her tenth and referenced a range of musical influences including 1970s New York punk rock, electronic, glam rock, punk-pop, 1950s rock and roll, Motown, hip-hop, rhythm and blues, spirituals, country, ska, soul, and film scores. The album was recorded in West London and Brooklyn, mixed in Berkeley, California, and mastered in Brooklyn.

It reached No. 16 on the UK indie album chart and No. 39 on the overall UK Albums Chart.

== Discography ==
=== Transvision Vamp albums ===
- Pop Art (1988)
- Velveteen (1989)
- Little Magnets Versus the Bubble of Babble (1991)

=== Solo albums ===
- Now Ain't the Time for Your Tears (1993) – UK No. 43, AUS No. 132
- I Came Here to Blow Minds (2011)
- The Price of the Ticket (2016)
- Queen High Straight (2020)
- The Shape of History (2024)

=== Racine albums ===
- Number One (2004)
- Racine 2 (2007)

=== Singles ===
- "The Nameless One" (1993) – UK No. 34, AUS No. 106
- "London's Brilliant" (1993) – UK No. 62
- "Do You Know What I'm Saying?" (1993) – UK No. 78, AUS No. 230
