= Racine 2 =

2007 studio album by Racine

Studio album by Racine
- Released: 13 February 2007
- Genres: Indie rock; alternative; art rock
- Length: 34:21
- Label: Jungle
- Producer: Wendy James

Racine chronology
| Number One (2004) | Racine 2 (2007) |

Racine 2 (also known as Racine Volume 2) is the second studio album by the indie rock band Racine. Lead singer Wendy James wrote and produced the entirety of the album, as she had done with the band's first album Number One.

The album was originally released in February 2007. In 2008, it was re-released in a special edition 2 disc set, the other disc being the demo versions of the band's first album Number One.

== Track listing ==
1. "Way" – 2:48
2. "I'm Freaking Out" – 1:58
3. "Racine" – 4:14
4. "Bobby's Gone Electric" – 2:58
5. "You're a Good Man, Sister" – 3:16
6. "There Ain't No Way... I Can't Do No Twenny in This" – 5:00
7. "Oui Ou Non-A Straight Boogaloo" – 2:48
8. "Stoned, Ripped and Twisted" – 4:00
9. "Essex Dog" – 3:01
10. "Those Leg Motherfuckers" – 2:52
11. "Bitter Funny" – 3:26
