= I Want Your Love (Transvision Vamp song) =

1988 single by Transvision Vamp

Single by Transvision Vamp

from the album Pop Art
- B-side: "Sweet Thing"; "Evolution Evie"
- Released: 6 June 1988
- Genre: Rock; new wave
- Length: 3:30
- Label: MCA
- Songwriter: Nick Christian Sayer
- Producers: Duncan Bridgeman; Zeus B. Held

Transvision Vamp singles chronology
"Tell That Girl to Shut Up" (1988)	"I Want Your Love" (1988)	"Revolution Baby" (1988)

Official audio
- "I Want Your Love" on YouTube

"I Want Your Love" is a song by the English pop rock band Transvision Vamp, released on 6 June 1988 by MCA Records as the third single from their debut studio album, Pop Art (1988). It was the band's first UK top 40 hit, reaching No. 5 on the UK singles chart in July 1988. It also peaked atop the Norwegian Singles Chart the same year and reached number-one in South Africa the following year.

== Track listings ==
7-inch single

A1. "I Want Your Love" – 3:20
B1. "Sweet Thing" – 3:45
B2. "Evolution Evie" (acoustic version) – 2:45

12-inch and German mini CD single

1. "I Want Your Love" (I Don't Want Your Money mix) – 6:18
2. "Sweet Thing" – 4:50
3. "Evolution Evie" (electric version) – 2:51

UK mini CD single

1. "I Want Your Love" (I Don't Want Your Money Mix) – 6:20
2. "Sweet Thing" – 4:50
3. "Evolution Evie" (electric version) – 2:51
4. "Tell That Girl to Shut Up" – 3:06

US 7-inch and cassette single; Japanese mini CD single

1. "I Want Your Love"
2. "Evolution Evie" (electric version)

== Charts ==
=== Weekly charts ===
Chart (1988–1989)	Peak position
Australia (ARIA)	7
Belgium (Ultratop 50 Flanders)	21
Denmark (Hitlisten)	18
Europe (Eurochart Hot 100)	17
Finland (Suomen virallinen lista)	2
France (IFOP)	91
Ireland (IRMA)	3
Netherlands (Dutch Top 40)	23
Netherlands (Single Top 100)	32
New Zealand (Recorded Music NZ)	9
Norway (VG-lista)	1
Portugal (AFP)	6
South Africa (Springbok Radio)	1
Sweden (Sverigetopplistan)	8
Switzerland (Schweizer Hitparade)	4
UK Singles (Official Charts)	5
West Germany (GfK)	23

=== Year-end charts ===
Chart (1988)	Position
UK Singles (OCC)	77

Chart (1989)	Position
Australia (ARIA)	63

== Nick Skitz and Melissa Tkautz version ==
"I Want Your Love"

Single by Nick Skitz and Melissa Tkautz
- Released: 2008
- Length: 3:14
- Label: Shock
- Songwriter: Nick Christian Sayer
- Producer: Nick Skitz

Melissa Tkautz singles chronology
"Easily Affected" (2006)	"I Want Your Love" (2008)	"Something About You" (2012)

Music video
- "I Want Your Love" on YouTube

The Australian DJ and dance music producer Nick Skitz covered "I Want Your Love" featuring the vocals of Melissa Tkautz. Their cover version version was released on 7 April 2008 through Destra Entertainment and peaked at No. 60 on the Australian ARIA Singles Chart.

=== Track listing ===
1. "I Want Your Love" (radio mix)
2. "I Want Your Love" (Mark Rachelle mix)
3. "I Want Your Love" (Disco Nexxion remix)
4. "I Want Your Love" (Bohn & Kasten remix)
5. "I Want Your Love" (Kamikaze Kid remix)
6. "I Want Your Love" (Al Storm remix)

=== Charts ===
Chart (2008)	Peak position
Australia (ARIA)	60
