= Dave Parsons =

British rock musician

- Born: 2 July 1966 (age 60)
- Genres: Alternative rock; grunge; punk rock
- Occupation: Musician
- Instrument: Bass guitar
- Years active: 1981–2002; 2025–present
- Member of: Transvision Vamp
- Formerly of: Bush; The Partisans

David Parsons (born 2 July 1966) is a British rock musician best known as the original bassist for the band Bush, which he joined in 1992 and left in 2002, when they went on hiatus. Prior to that, Parsons was a member of the punk group the Partisans (1978–1984) and the alternative rock band Transvision Vamp (1986–1991). In 2025, Parsons rejoined a reformed Transvision Vamp.

== Discography ==
=== with the Partisans ===
- Time Was Right (1984)

=== with Transvision Vamp ===
- Pop Art (1988)
- Velveteen (1989)
- Little Magnets Versus the Bubble of Babble (1991)

=== with Bush ===
- Sixteen Stone (1994)
- Razorblade Suitcase (1996)
- The Science of Things (1999)
- Golden State (2001)
