= Tell That Girl to Shut Up =

1988 single by Transvision Vamp

Single by Transvision Vamp

from the album Pop Art
- B-side: "God Save the Royalties"
- Released: March 1988
- Length: 3:08
- Label: MCA
- Songwriter: Holly Beth Vincent
- Producer: Zeus B. Held

Transvision Vamp singles chronology
"Revolution Baby" (1987)	"Tell That Girl to Shut Up" (1988)	"I Want Your Love" (1988)

"Tell That Girl to Shut Up" is a song written by the American new wave singer Holly Beth Vincent and originally recorded by her band Holly and the Italians in 1979. A cover version by the English pop rock band Transvision Vamp was released in March 1988 by MCA Records as the second single from their debut studio album Pop Art. In Australia, "Tell That Girl to Shut Up" was released in 1989 as the third single from the album, following the 1988 release of "Revolution Baby".

== B-side ==
The B-side of the Transvision Vamp single, "God Save the Royalties", is the Pop Art album track "Psychosonic Cindy" remixed and in reverse (the title being a pun on saving royalty payments).

== Track listings ==
7-inch and US cassette single

A. "Tell That Girl to Shut Up" – 3:05
B. "God Save the Royalties" – 3:12

12-inch single

A1. "Tell That Girl to Shut Up" (extended mix) – 6:20
B1. "Tell That Girl to Shut Up" (Knuckle Duster mix) – 4:44
B2. "God Save the Royalties" – 3:12

CD single

1. "Tell That Girl to Shut Up" (extended mix) – 6:20
2. "God Save the Royalties" – 3:12
3. "Tell That Girl to Shut Up" (7-inch version) – 3:05
4. "Tell That Girl to Shut Up" (Knuckle Duster mix) – 4:44

== Charts ==
Chart (1988–1989)	Peak position
Australia (ARIA)	44
Denmark (Hitlisten)	21
UK Singles (Official Charts)	45
US Billboard Hot 100	87
US Modern Rock Tracks (Billboard)	9
