= Anniversary – 10 Years of Hits =

1982 compilation album by George Jones

Greatest hits album by George Jones
- Released: October 30, 1982
- Recorded: 1972 – 1982
- Genre: Country
- Length: 61:53
- Label: Epic
- Producer: Billy Sherrill

George Jones compilation albums chronology
Encore - George Jones (1981)	Anniversary – 10 Years of Hits (1982)	By Request (1984)

Professional ratings
Review scores
Source	Rating
AllMusic	5/5 stars
Robert Christgau	(A−)
The Rolling Stone Album Guide	4.5/5 stars

Anniversary – 10 Years of Hits is an album by American country music artist George Jones released on October 30, 1982, on the Epic Records label. It went gold in 1989. The CD edition was issued in 1990.

== Background ==
Although Jones's pre-Epic recordings had been repackaged and compiled countless times, Anniversary - 10 Years of Hits was the first comprehensive collection of the singer's biggest hits with the label. It contains all of his number one hits with Epic over the previous decade: "The Grand Tour" (1974), "The Door" (1975), "He Stopped Loving Her Today" (1980), and "Still Doin' Time" (1981). The set does not contain his chart toppers with ex-wife Tammy Wynette from the period (1973's "We're Gonna Hold On", 1976's "Golden Ring", and 1977's "Near You"). For many casual country fans, this would be the only Jones album that they owned. Stephen Thomas Erlewine of AllMusic observes: "What makes Anniversary transcendent, one of the best country albums of all time, is the context and subtext, how it reads like an autobiography of the most turbulent, heartbreaking decade in Jones' life." It went gold in 1989 and a CD edition was issued in 1990. All the songs are produced by Billy Sherrill.

== Track listing ==
=== Vinyl ===
Side one
No.	Title	Writer(s)	Length
1.	"We Can Make It"	Billy Sherrill, Glenn Sutton	2:03
2.	"Loving You Could Never Be Better"	Earl Montgomery, Charlene Montgomery, Betty Tate	3:05
3.	"A Picture of Me (Without You)"	George Richey, Norro Wilson	2:32
4.	"What My Woman Can't Do"	George Jones, Earl Montgomery, Billy Sherrill	2:35
5.	"Nothing Ever Hurt Me (Half as Bad as Losing You)"	Bobby Braddock	2:19
6.	"Once You've Had the Best"	Johnny Paycheck	2:38

Side two
No.	Title	Writer(s)	Length
7.	"The Grand Tour"	George Richey, Norro Wilson, Carmol Taylor	3:05
8.	"The Door"	Billy Sherrill, Norro Wilson	2:42
9.	"These Days (I Barely Get By)"	George Jones, Tammy Wynette	3:01
10.	"Memories of Us"	Dave Kirby, Glenn Martin	3:14
11.	"The Battle"	George Richey, Norro Wilson, Linda Kimball	2:45

Side three
No.	Title	Writer(s)	Length
12.	"Her Name Is"	Bobby Braddock	2:17
13.	"Old King Kong"	Sammy Lyons	2:18
14.	"Bartender's Blues"	James Taylor	3:45
15.	"I'll Just Take It Out in Love"	Bob McDill	3:09
16.	"Someday My Day Will Come"	Earl Montgomery, Chris Ryder, V.L. Haywood	2:32

Side four
No.	Title	Writer(s)	Length
17.	"He Stopped Loving Her Today"	Bobby Braddock, Curly Putman	3:15
18.	"I'm Not Ready Yet"	Tom T. Hall	2:58
19.	"If Drinkin' Don't Kill Me (Her Memory Will)"	Harlan Sanders, Rick Beresford	3:10
20.	"Good Ones and Bad Ones"	Joe Chambers, Larry Jenkins	2:46
21.	"Still Doin' Time"	Michael P. Heeney, John E. Moffat	2:50
22.	"Same Ole Me (w/ The Oak Ridge Boys)"	Paul Overstreet	2:54

=== CD ===
The CD release reverses the order of sides 2 and 3.

No.	Title	Writer(s)	Length
1.	"We Can Make It"	Billy Sherrill, Glenn Sutton	2:03
2.	"Loving You Could Never Be Better"	Earl Montgomery, Charlene Montgomery, Betty Tate	3:05
3.	"A Picture of Me (Without You)"	George Richey, Norro Wilson	2:32
4.	"What My Woman Can't Do"	George Jones, Earl Montgomery, Billy Sherrill	2:35
5.	"Nothing Ever Hurt Me (Half as Bad as Losing You)"	Bobby Braddock	2:19
6.	"Once You've Had the Best"	Johnny Paycheck	2:38
7.	"Her Name Is"	Bobby Braddock	2:17
8.	"Old King Kong"	Sammy Lyons	2:18
9.	"Bartender's Blues"	James Taylor	3:45
10.	"I'll Just Take It Out in Love"	Bob McDill	3:09
11.	"Someday My Day Will Come"	Earl Montgomery, Chris Ryder, V.L. Haywood	2:32
12.	"The Grand Tour"	George Richey, Carmol Taylor, Norro Wilson	3:05
13.	"The Door"	Billy Sherrill, Norro Wilson	2:42
14.	"These Days (I Barely Get By)"	George Jones, Tammy Wynette	3:01
15.	"Memories of Us"	Dave Kirby, Glenn Martin	3:14
16.	"The Battle"	George Richey, Norro Wilson, Linda Kimball	2:45
17.	"He Stopped Loving Her Today"	Bobby Braddock, Curly Putman	3:15
18.	"I'm Not Ready Yet"	Tom T. Hall	2:58
19.	"If Drinkin' Don't Kill Me (Her Memory Will)"	Harlan Sanders, Rick Beresford	3:10
20.	"Good Ones and Bad Ones"	Joe Chambers, Larry Jenkins	2:46
21.	"Still Doin' Time"	Michael P. Heeney, John E. Moffat	2:50
22.	"Same Ole Me"	Paul Overstreet	2:54

== Charts ==
=== Weekly charts ===
Chart (1982)	Peak position
US Top Country Albums (Billboard)	16

=== Year-end charts ===
Chart (1983)	Position
US Top Country Albums (Billboard)	38

== Certifications ==
Region	Certification
United States (RIAA)	Gold
