= The Best of George Jones =

Greatest hits album by George Jones
- Released: March 1975
- Recorded: Columbia Recording Studio, Nashville, TN
- Genre: Country
- Label: Epic
- Producer: Billy Sherrill

George Jones chronology
The Grand Tour (1974)	The Best of George Jones (1975)	Memories of Us (1975)

Professional ratings
Review scores
Source	Rating
Christgau's Record Guide	B+

The Best of George Jones is an album by American country music artist George Jones. It is notable for including two new songs, The Door, which became a #1 country hit in the US and in Canada, and These Days (I Barely Get By). The album was released in March 1975.

== Track listing ==
No.	Title	Writer(s)	Original album	Length
1.	"The Door"	Billy Sherrill, Norro Wilson	Previously unreleased	2:40
2.	"These Days (I Barely Get By)"	George Jones, Tammy Wynette	Previously unreleased	2:59
3.	"A Picture of Me (Without You)"	George Richey, Wilson	A Picture of Me (Without You)	2:30
4.	"The Grand Tour"	Wilson, Richey, Carmol Taylor	The Grand Tour	3:04
5.	"We Can Make It"	Sherrill, Glenn Sutton	We Can Make It	2:03
6.	"The Weatherman"	Wilson, Richey, Taylor	The Grand Tour	2:13
7.	"Loving You Could Never Be Better"	Earl Montgomery	We Can Make It	3:00
8.	"What My Woman Can't Do"	Jones, Sherrill, Montgomery	Nothing Ever Hurt Me (Half as Bad as Losing You)	2:34
9.	"Once You've Had the Best"	Johnny Paycheck	The Grand Tour	2:36
10.	"Nothing Ever Hurt Me (Half as Bad as Losing You)"	Bobby Braddock	Nothing Ever Hurt Me (Half as Bad as Losing You)	2:18

== Charting Singles ==
Single	Chart	Peak position
The Door	U.S. Billboard Hot Country Singles	1
The Door	Canadian Country (RPM)	1
These Days (I Barely Get By)	U.S. Billboard Hot Country Singles	10
These Days (I Barely Get By)	Canadian Country (RPM)	9
