= Encore (George Jones album) =

Compilation album by George Jones
- Released: 1981
- Recorded: Nashville
- Genre: Country
- Label: Epic
- Producer: Billy Sherrill

George Jones compilation albums chronology
All-Time Greatest Hits, Vol. 1 (1977)	Encore (1981)	Anniversary - 10 Years of Hits (1982)

Encore is a compilation album by George Jones released on the Epic Records label in 1981.

As a compilation, the album is overshadowed by Anniversary - 10 Years of Hits, which was released the following year, but Encore is significant because it features the obscure Jones cut "We Oughta Be Ashamed" (a 1979 b-side of "Someday My Day Will Come"), which he composed with Earl Montgomery. Both Johnny Cash and Elvis Costello also recorded versions of the song. Encore also features duets with James Taylor and Willie Nelson. The album peaked at number 43 on the Billboard country albums chart.

== Track listing ==
1. "The Grand Tour" (George Richey, Carmol Taylor, Norro Wilson)
2. "Once You've Had the Best" (Johnny Paycheck)
3. "I'll Just Take It Out in Love" (Bob McDill)
4. "Someday My Day Will Come" (Earl Montgomery, Chris Ryder, V.L. Haywood)
5. "Why Me" (Kris Kristofferson)
6. "She Thinks I Still Care" (Dickey Lee, Steve Duffy)
7. "We Oughta Be Ashamed" (George Jones, Earl Montgomery)
8. "Bartender's Blues (w/ James Taylor" (James Taylor)
9. "I Just Don't Give a Damn" (George Jones, Jimmy Peppers)
10. "I Gotta Get Drunk" (w/ Willie Nelson) (Willie Nelson)
