= Super Hits (George Jones album) =

Greatest hits album by George Jones
- Released: 1987
- Genre: Country
- Length: 28:55
- Label: Epic
- Producer: Billy Sherrill

George Jones compilation albums chronology
First Time Live (1984)	Super Hits (1987)	Super Hits, Volume 2 (1993)

Professional ratings
Review scores
Source	Rating
AllMusic	link
The Rolling Stone Album Guide	4/5 stars

Super Hits is an album by American country music singer George Jones, released in 1987 on the Epic Records label. It was certified platinum by the RIAA in 1992, and double platinum in 2002. It has sold 2,289,000 copies in the US as of May 2013.

This is the first of Sony Music's long-running Super Hits series of budget-priced compilations.

== Track listing ==
No.	Title	Writer(s)	Length
1.	"White Lightning"	J. P. Richardson	2:36
2.	"Why Baby Why"	George Jones, Darrell Edwards	2:26
3.	"Window Up Above"	George Jones	2:56
4.	"A Picture of Me (Without You)"	Norro Wilson, George Richey	2:32
5.	"The Grand Tour"	Norro Wilson, George Richey, Carmol Taylor	3:07
6.	"Bartender's Blues (w/ James Taylor)"	James Taylor	3:45
7.	"He Stopped Loving Her Today"	Bobby Braddock, Curly Putman	3:17
8.	"Tennessee Whiskey"	Dean Dillon, Linda Hargrove	2:53
9.	"The One I Loved Back Then (The Corvette Song)"	Gary Gentry	2:31
10.	"Who's Gonna Fill Their Shoes"	Max D. Barnes, Troy Seals	3:15

== Chart performance ==
Chart (1987)	Peak position
U.S. Billboard Top Country Albums	26
Chart (2013)	Peak position
U.S. Billboard 200	56

=== Year-end charts ===
Chart (2002)	Peak position
Canadian Country Albums (Nielsen SoundScan)	98

== Certifications ==
Region	Certification	Certified units/sales
United States (RIAA)	2× Platinum	2,000,000^{^}
^{^} Shipments figures based on certification alone.
