= By Request (George Jones album) =

Compilation album by George Jones
- Released: 1984
- Genre: Country
- Label: Epic
- Producer: Billy Sherrill

George Jones compilation albums chronology
| Anniversary - 10 Years of Hits (1982) | By Request (1984) | First Time Live (1984) |

Professional ratings
Review scores
| Source | Rating |
|---|---|
| AllMusic | 3/5 stars |

By Request is an album by American country music artist George Jones released in 1984 on the Epic Records label.

The album collects many of Jones's hits (including three number ones) but does not include "He Stopped Loving Her Today" which was Jones's signature hit in 1980. It features several other country stars, including the Oak Ridge Boys and Merle Haggard. By Request also marks the first time that "We Didn't See A Thing" appeared on a Jones album, his top ten country hit with Ray Charles. The "buddy song" makes light of the blind pianist's vision impairment, something Charles had often done in the past. The two vocal giants had united to record the song for Charles's 1984 duet collaborations album, Friendship, which had been recorded in Nashville by Jones's producer Billy Sherrill. It was the only recording the pair ever made together and features Chet Atkins on guitar. They performed the song together on a 1984 awards show, which can be seen on YouTube.

== Track listing ==
| No. | Title | Writer(s) | Length |
|---|---|---|---|
| 1. | "Shine On (Shine All Your Sweet Love on Me)" | Johnny MacRae, Bob Morrison |
| 2. | "Still Doin' Time" | Michael P. Heeney, John E. Moffat |
| 3. | "C.C. Waterback" (duet with Merle Haggard) | Merle Haggard |
| 4. | "Same Ole Me" (backing vocals by The Oak Ridge Boys) | Paul Overstreet |
| 5. | "I Always Get Lucky with You" | Haggard, Gary Church, Freddy Powers, Tex Whitson |
| 6. | "Radio Lover" | Ron Hellard, Bucky Jones, Curly Putman |
| 7. | "Yesterday's Wine" (duet with Merle Haggard) | Willie Nelson |
| 8. | "Almost Persuaded" | Billy Sherrill, Glenn Sutton |
| 9. | "Tennessee Whiskey" | Dean Dillon, Linda Hargrove |
| 10. | "We Didn't See a Thing" (duet with Ray Charles and guitar by Chet Atkins) | Gary Gentry |
