= My Very Special Guests =

Studio album by George Jones
- Released: 1979
- Recorded: February 22, 1977 – March 3, 1978
- Studio: CBS (Nashville); CBS (New York); The Sound Factory (Los Angeles); Muscle Shoals Sound (Muscle Shoals)
- Genre: Country
- Length: 29:45
- Label: Epic
- Producer: Billy Sherrill

George Jones chronology
Bartender's Blues (1978)	My Very Special Guests (1979)	Double Trouble (1980)

Singles from My Very Special Guests
- 1. "Bartender's Blues" Released: December 1977

My Very Special Guests is a duet album by American country music artist George Jones. It was recorded between February 22, 1977, and March 3, 1978, and released in 1979 by Epic Records. Jones was experiencing serious personal and financial problems during this period.

My Very Special Guests is also a companion piece of sorts to an hour-and-a-quarter long HBO television special entitled George Jones: With a Little Help from His Friends, which saw the painfully wan singer performing songs with many of the singers from the album, including Jennings, who later recalled, "The best thing we ever cut together was a record of 'Night Life' that we did for one of his albums for Billy Sherrill. I'm singing so high you wouldn't believe it's me."

== Reception ==
Professional ratings
Review scores
Source	Rating
AllMusic	4/5 stars
Christgau's Record Guide	A−
The Rolling Stone Album Guide	3.5/5 stars

My Very Special Guests produced no hit singles and only made it to number 38 on the Billboard country albums chart.

== Track listing ==
Side one
No.	Title	Writer(s)	Length
1.	"Night Life" (with Waylon Jennings)	Willie Nelson, Paul Buskirk, Walter Breeland	3:41
2.	"Bartender's Blues" (with James Taylor)	James Taylor	3:42
3.	"Here We Are" (with Emmylou Harris)	Rodney Crowell	2:50
4.	"I've Turned You to Stone" (with Linda Ronstadt)	Jim Rushing	2:35
5.	"It Sure Was Good" (with Tammy Wynette)	George Richey, Billy Sherrill	2:44

Side two
No.	Title	Writer(s)	Length
1.	"I Gotta Get Drunk" (with Willie Nelson)	Willie Nelson	2:08
2.	"Proud Mary" (with Johnny Paycheck)	John Fogerty	2:58
3.	"Stranger in the House" (with Elvis Costello)	Elvis Costello	3:35
4.	"I Still Hold Her Body (But I Think I've Lost Her Mind)" (with Dennis Locorriere and Ray Sawyer of Dr. Hook)	Dennis Locorriere, Ray Sawyer	2:31
5.	"Will the Circle Be Unbroken" (with Pop Staples and Mavis Staples)	Ada Habershon, Charles Gabriel	3:01

=== 2005 reissue ===
A 2005 reissue of this album, as part of a series called American Milestones, was listed among the 52 CD releases from Sony BMG that were identified as having been shipped with the controversial Extended Copy Protection (XCP) computer software, which has been known to cause a number of serious security problems in any Microsoft Windows computer that had the CD inserted at one time and has been regarded as a trojan horse, spyware, or rootkit by a number of security software vendors. Sony discontinued use of the technology on November 11, 2005, and recalled this and other titles affected by XCP, and asked customers to submit copies affected by the software to the company so that it could replace them with copies that did not contain the software.

Disc 1

1. "Night Life" (with Waylon Jennings)
2. "Bartender's Blues" (with James Taylor)
3. "Here We Are" (with Emmylou Harris)
4. "I've Turned You to Stone" (with Linda Ronstadt)
5. "It Sure Was Good" (with Tammy Wynette)
6. "I Gotta Get Drunk" (with Willie Nelson)
7. "Proud Mary" (with Johnny Paycheck)
8. "Stranger in the House" (with Elvis Costello)
9. "I Still Hold Her Body (But I Think I've Lost Her Mind)" (with Dennis Locorriere and Ray Sawyer of Dr. Hook)
10. "Will the Circle Be Unbroken" (with Pop Staples and Mavis Staples)
11. "A Few Ole Country Boys" (with Randy Travis)
12. "It Hurts as Much in Texas (As It Did in Tennessee)" (with Ricky Van Shelton)
13. "You Never Looked That Good When You Were Mine" (with Patti Page)
14. "All I Want to Do in Life" (with Janie Fricke)
15. "Wonderful World Outside" (with Ralph Stanley)
16. "You Can't Do Wrong and Get By" (with Ricky Skaggs)
17. "You Don't Seem to Miss Me" (with Patty Loveless)
18. "Patches" (with B.B. King)
19. [Untitled Track] [CD-ROM Track]
20. [Untitled Track] [CD-ROM Track]

Disc 2

1. "A Good Year for the Roses" (with Alan Jackson)
2. "Yesterday's Wine" (with Merle Haggard)
3. "Our Love Was Ahead of Its Time" (with Deborah Allen)
4. "We Sure Make Good Love" (with Loretta Lynn)
5. "Size Seven Round (Made of Gold)" (with Lacy J. Dalton)
6. "I Got Stripes" (with Johnny Cash)
7. "Fiddle and Guitar Band" (with Charlie Daniels)
8. "We Didn't See a Thing" (with Ray Charles and Chet Atkins)
9. "The Love Bug" (with Vince Gill)
10. "Love's Gonna Live Here" (with Buck Owens)
11. "If I Could Bottle This Up" (with Shelby Lynne)
12. "If You Can Touch Her at All" (with Lynn Anderson)
13. "All That We've Got Left" (with Vern Gosdin)
14. "This Bottle (In My Hand)" (with David Allan Coe)
15. "Talking to Hank" (with Mark Chesnutt)
16. "Never Bit a Bullet Like This" (with Sammy Kershaw)
17. "The Race Is On" (with Travis Tritt)
18. "I've Been There" (with Tim Mensy)
19. "Traveller's Prayer" (with Sweethearts of the Rodeo)
20. [Untitled Track] [CD-ROM Track]
21. [Untitled Track] [CD-ROM Track]

== Personnel ==
Credits adapted from LP liner notes.

Musicians

- Hargus "Pig" Robbins – piano (1–2, 4–5, 8, 10)
- Tommy Cogbill – bass (1, 4, 9)
- Jim Isbell – drums (1–2, 4, 9)
- Tommy Allsup – guitar (1, 4, 7–10)
- Phil Baugh – guitar (1–2, 4, 7–10)
- Cliff Parker – guitar (1, 4–5, 7, 9)
- Pete Wade – guitar (1, 4, 8, 10)
- Buddy Emmons – steel guitar (1, 6)
- Jim Vest – steel guitar (1, 4–5, 9)
- Charlie McCoy – harmonica (1, 4)
- Henry Strzelecki – bass (2, 5, 8, 10)
- Billy Sanford – guitar (2, 7–8, 10)
- Reggie Young – guitar (2)
- Pete Drake – steel guitar (2, 8, 10)
- Glen Hardin – piano (3)
- Emory Gordy – bass (3)
- John Ware – drums (3)
- Brian Ahern – guitar (3)
- Rodney Crowell – guitar (3)
- Emmylou Harris – guitar (3)
- Albert Lee – guitar (3)
- Hank DeVito – steel guitar (3)
- Mickey Raphael – harmonica (3, 6)
- Jerry Carrigan – drums (5)
- Jimmy Capps – guitar (5)
- Glenn Keener – guitar (5)
- The Nashville Edition – background vocals (5, 7)
- The Jordanaires – background vocals (5)
- Millie Kirkham – background vocals (5)
- Bobbie Nelson – piano (6)
- Chris Ethridge – bass (6)
- Paul English – drums (6)
- Willie Nelson – guitar (6)
- Jody Payne – guitar (6)
- Johnny Gimble – fiddle (6, 8–10)
- Bobby Wood – piano (7)
- Steve Schaffer – bass (7)
- Jerry Kroon – drums (7)
- Jim Murphy – steel guitar (7)
- Karl Himmel – drums (8, 10)
- Elvis Costello – guitar (8)
- Larry Butler – piano (9)

Technical

- Billy Sherrill – producer
- Lou Bradley – engineer (1, 3–10)
- Don Meehan – engineer (2)
- Ron Reynolds – engineer (2)
- Ken Robertson – engineer (2)
- Jim Nipar – engineer (3–4)
- Ken Laxton – engineer (6, 8)
- Bill Fair – engineer (10)
