= A Picture of Me (Without You) =

A Picture of Me may refer to:

- A Picture of Me (Without You) (album), 1972, by George Jones
  - "A Picture of Me (Without You)" (song), 1972, by Jones
