= I Wanta Sing =

Studio album by George Jones
- Released: 1977
- Recorded: 1977
- Genre: Country, country rock
- Label: Epic
- Producer: Billy Sherrill

George Jones chronology
Alone Again (1976)	I Wanta Sing (1977)	Bartender's Blues (1978)

Singles from I Wanta Sing
- 1. "Old King Kong" Released: March 5, 1977; 2. "If I Could Put Them All Together (I'd Have You)" Released: September 19, 1977

I Wanta Sing is an album by country singer George Jones. It was released in 1977 on the Epic record label.

== Background ==
Jones's first two solo albums, 1975's Memories of Us and 1976's The Battle, did not crack the top 20 on Billboard's country albums chart. I Wanta Sing peaked at number 38. Two singles, "Old King Kong" and "If I Could Put Them All Together", also failed to crack the top 20.

"They've Got Millions in Milwaukee" is a cover of a Larry Chesier song from 1976. "I Love You So Much It Hurts" is a cover of a Floyd Tillman song from 1946 that was also recorded by Merle Haggard in 1977. "Bull Mountain Lad" is a cover of a Wild Bill Emerson song from his 1976 album, Bull Mountain Lad.

== Critical reception ==
Professional ratings
Review scores
Source	Rating
Christgau's Record Guide	B

The New York Times called the album "a good, pure-country example of his mellow bass-baritone at work."

== Track listing ==
1. "I Wanta Sing" (George Jones, Earl Montgomery, Ernie Rowell)
2. "Please Don't Sell Me Anymore Whiskey Tonight" (Jody Emerson, Ronal McCown)
3. "They've Got Millions in Milwaukee" (Larry Cheshier, Glenn Sutton)
4. "If I Could Put Them All Together (I'd Have You)" (Even Stevens)
5. "I Love You So Much It Hurts" (Floyd Tillman)
6. "Rest in Peace" (George Richey, Billy Sherrill)
7. "Bull Mountain Lad" ("Wild" Bill Emerson, Jody Emerson)
8. "Old King Kong" (Sammy Lyons)
9. "You've Got the Best of Me Again" (Ernie Rowell, Bob House)
10. "It's a 10–33 (Let's Get Jesus on the Line)" (Earl Montgomery, Alvin McLendon, Al Stancil)

== Personnel ==
- George Jones – vocals
- Cliff Parker – electric guitar
- Ray Edenton – acoustic guitar
- Jim Vest, Pete Drake – steel guitar
- Henry Strzelecki – bass
- Buddy Spicher – fiddle
- Hargus "Pig" Robbins – piano
- Charlie McCoy – harmonica
- Jerry Carrigan – drums
