= In a Gospel Way =

Studio album by George Jones
- Released: February 22, 1974
- Recorded: May 1973
- Studios: Columbia (Nashville, Tennessee)
- Genres: Country, gospel
- Length: 31:25
- Label: Epic
- Producer: Billy Sherrill

George Jones chronology
Nothing Ever Hurt Me (Half as Bad as Losing You) (1973)	In a Gospel Way (1974)	The Grand Tour (1974)

In a Gospel Way is an album by American country music artist George Jones, released in 1974 on the Epic Records label. It is Jones’ 49th Album Release.

Professional ratings
Review scores
Source	Rating
Allmusic	2.5/5 stars

== Background ==
The album includes the track "Release Me (From My Sin)," which is a sacred gospel adaptation of the 1949 secular country and pop standard "Release Me," originally written by Eddie Miller and Robert Yount. While the melody remains identical, the lyrics were modified by Miller to feature religious themes ("Release me from sin to sin no more") to appeal to the Southern gospel music industry.

== Track listing ==
No.	Title	Writer(s)	Length
1.	"In a Gospel Way"	Earl Montgomery, George Jones	2:34
2.	"Why Me, Lord?"	Kris Kristofferson	2:55
3.	"A Man I Always Wanted to Meet"	Bobby Braddock, Curly Putman	2:19
4.	"The Baptism of Jesse Taylor"	Dallas Frazier, Sanger D. Shafer	2:35
5.	"Release Me (From My Sin)"	Eddie Miller, William McCall	3:03
6.	"Amazing Grace"	John Newton, Bill Walker, William J. Gaither	3:19
7.	"Mama's Hands"	Larry Kingston, Frank Dycus	2:55
8.	"God Keeps the Wild Flowers Blooming"	Bobby Abshire	3:09
9.	"Mama Was a Preacher Man"	Earl Montgomery, George Jones	2:59
10.	"I Wonder How John Felt (When He Baptised Jesus)"	Billy Sherrill, Norro Wilson, Carmol Taylor	2:15
11.	"I Can't Find It"	Curly Putman	3:11

== Charts ==
Chart (1974)	Peak position
US Top Country Albums (Billboard)	42
