= Something in Red =

Studio album by Lorrie Morgan
- Released: April 9, 1991
- Recorded: 1990–1991
- Studio: The Music Mill; Nashville, TN
- Genre: Country
- Length: 35:07
- Label: RCA Nashville
- Producer: Richard Landis: "Best Woman Wins" produced by Steve Buckingham, Dolly Parton and Gary Smith

Lorrie Morgan chronology
Leave the Light On (1989)	Something in Red (1991)	Watch Me (1992)

Singles from Something in Red
- 1. "We Both Walk" Released: March 13, 1991; 2. "A Picture of Me (Without You)" Released: June 1991; 3. "Except for Monday" Released: October 1991; 4. "Something in Red" Released: April 1992

Professional ratings
Review scores
Source	Rating
AllMusic	3/5 stars
Chicago Tribune	3.5/4 stars
Robert Christgau	(dud)

Something in Red is the second studio album by American country music artist Lorrie Morgan. It reached No. 8 on the Billboard country albums chart, including the No. 3 "We Both Walk," the No. 9 "A Picture of Me (Without You)" (a cover of a George Jones song from his 1972 album A Picture of Me (Without You)), the No. 4 "Except for Monday," and the No. 14 title song. The duet with Dolly Parton, "Best Woman Wins", appeared simultaneously on both Something in Red and Parton's album Eagle When She Flies.

== Track listing ==
No.	Title	Writer(s)	Length
1.	"Autumn's Not That Cold"	Skip Ewing, Max D. Barnes	3:41
2.	"We Both Walk"	Tom Shapiro, Chris Waters	3:05
3.	"Something in Red"	Angela Kaset	4:40
4.	"Except for Monday"	Reed Nielsen	2:56
5.	"A Picture of Me (Without You)"	Norro Wilson, George Richey	3:39
6.	"Tears on My Pillow"	Sylvester Bradford, Al Lewis	3:09
7.	"Best Woman Wins" (duet with Dolly Parton)	Dolly Parton	3:18
8.	"In Tears"	Rory Bourke, Mike Reid	3:25
9.	"Hand Over Your Heart"	Larson Paine, Bobby Paine, Essra Mohawk	3:10
10.	"Faithfully"	Jonathan Cain	3:58

== Personnel ==
As listed in liner notes.

- Richard Bennett - electric guitar
- Michael Black - background vocals
- Costo Davis - synthesizer
- Glen Duncan - fiddle
- Paul Franklin - steel guitar
- Steven A. Gibson - acoustic guitar
- Mitch Humphries - keyboards
- Paul Leim - drums
- Michael Rhodes - bass guitar
- Brent Rowan - electric guitar
- Harry Stinson - background vocals
- Dennis Wilson - background vocals
- Glenn Worf - bass guitar

=== The Robert Jason Singers ===
- Debbie Hall
- Sandie Hall
- Robert Jason
- Gene Morford
- Sally Stevens
- Jerry Whitman

=== Band on "Faithfully" ===
- Spud Cottingham - keyboards, background vocals
- Dave Fowler - bass guitar, background vocals
- Noel Roy - lead guitar, background vocals
- Rick Vanaugh - drums, background vocals
- David Wood - rhythm guitar, steel guitar, background vocals

== Production ==
- All tracks produced by Richard Landis, except "Best Woman Wins," produced by Steve Buckingham, Dolly Parton and Gary Smith
- Engineered By Jim Cotton & Mike McCarthy
- Mixed By Jim Cotton & Joe Scaife
- Mastered By Hank Williams

== Charts ==
=== Weekly charts ===
Chart (1991–1992)	Peak position
Canadian Country Albums (RPM)	13
US Billboard 200	53
US Top Country Albums (Billboard)	8

=== Year-end charts ===
Chart (1992)	Position
US Billboard 200	90
US Top Country Albums (Billboard)	14
Chart (1993)	Position
US Top Country Albums (Billboard)	53
