= Memories of Us (disambiguation) =

Memories of Us may refer to:

- Memories of Us, 1975 album by George Jones
  - "Memories of Us" (song), 1975 single by George Jones

== See also ==
- "Making Memories of Us", Keith Urban song
