= Bartender's Blues =

Bartender's Blues may refer to:

- "Bartender's Blues" (song), a 1977 song by James Taylor
- Bartender's Blues (album), a 1978 album by George Jones, featuring the song
