= First Time Live =

Live album by George Jones
- Released: October 13, 1984
- Genre: Country
- Length: 31:06
- Label: Epic
- Producer: Billy Sherrill

George Jones compilation albums chronology
By Request (1984)	First Time Live (1984)	Super Hits (1987)

Professional ratings
Review scores
Source	Rating
AllMusic	2/5 stars
The Rolling Stone Album Guide	3/5 stars

First Time Live is an album by American country music artist George Jones. This album was released on October 13, 1984, on the Epic Records label.

== Background ==
First Time Live was recorded in the fall of 1984 but wasn't released to stores until 1985. While not nearly as historically relevant as Live at Dancetown U.S.A. (a vintage 1965 Jones performance from his honky-tonk heyday), First Time Live offers a glimpse into what Jones's live shows were like the late-1980s, which almost always started with "No Show Jones", a song he recorded with Haggard that pokes fun at the Possum's infamous reputation for missing shows due to drunkenness (bandleader Ron Gaddis would sing Haggard's part in concert). In 2006 Jones would tell Billboard, "It's true, I did miss quite a few dates. But they wouldn't have wanted to see or hear me anyhow, the shape I was in. Now I know it did hurt my fans in a way and I've always been sad about that, it really bothered me for a long time...Even if they got their money back...they still lost the chance to see somebody they loved to hear sing, and I cheated them out of that." Another highlight is a medley of old hits, which includes Jones's 1974 masterpiece "The Grand Tour".

On tour Jones was always backed by the Jones Boys. Like Buck Owens's Buckaroos and Merle Haggard's Strangers, Jones worked with many musicians who were great talents in their own right. These included Dan Schafer, Hank Singer, Brittany Allyn, Sonny Curtis, Kent Goodson, Bobby Birkhead, and Steve Hinson. In the 1980s and 1990s, bass player Ron Gaddis served as the Jones Boys' bandleader and sang harmony with George in concert. Lorrie Morgan (who married Gaddis) also toured as a backup singer for Jones in the late 1970s and early 1980s. Johnny Paycheck was the Jones Boys' bass player in the 1960s before going on to his own stardom in the 1970s.

== Reception ==
There were no singles released from the album, which barely cracked the top 50 on the Billboard country albums chart. The album does include a version of "She's My Rock", which had been a hit single in 1984. Jones biographer Bob Allen trashes the album, calling it one of the "real artistic nadirs" of this period and deeming it "a tired collection of concert recordings whose general shoddiness is even reflected in its historically inaccurate title."

== Track listing ==
No.	Title	Writer(s)	Length
1.	"No Show Jones"	George Jones, Glenn Martin	3:45
2.	"The Race Is On"	Don Rollins	2:57
3.	"Fox on the Run"	Tony Hazzard	2:06
4.	"Tennessee Whiskey"	Dean Dillon, Linda Hargrove	3:02
5.	"I'm Not Ready Yet"	Tom T. Hall	4:08
6.	"Who's Gonna Chop My Baby's Kindlin'"	Fred Maddox	2:59
7.	"Medley: I'll Share My World with You/Window Up Above/The Grand Tour/Walk Through This World With Me"	Ben Wilson/Jones/George Richey, Carmol Taylor, Norro Wilson, Sandy Seamons, Kaye Savage	6:03
8.	"You Better Treat Your Man Right"	Wayne Raney	3:51
9.	"He Stopped Loving Her Today"	Bobby Braddock, Curly Putman	4:34
10.	"She's My Rock"	Gene Dobbins	3:01

== Charts ==
Chart (1984)	Peak position
U.S. Billboard Top Country Albums	45
