= If I Could Put Them All Together (I'd Have You) =

Single by George Jones

from the album I Wanta Sing
- B-side: "You've Got the Best of Me Again"
- Released: 1977
- Recorded: 1977
- Genre: Country
- Length: 3:12
- Label: Epic
- Songwriter(s): Even Stevens
- Producer(s): Billy Sherrill

George Jones singles chronology
"Old King Kong" (1977)	"If I Could Put Them All Together (I'd Have You)" (1977)	"Bartender's Blues" (1978)

"If I Could Put Them All Together (I'd Have You)" is a song by American country singer George Jones. Composed by Even Stevens, it was released as a single on Epic Records in 1977 and peaked at #24 on the Billboard country singles chart, a dismal showing for a George Jones record. Despite being a "stone country" song that Jones promoted with several television appearances (including Marty Robbins' TV show), it failed to find a wider audience.

== Chart performance ==
Chart (1977)	Peak position
U.S. Billboard Hot Country Singles	24
Canadian RPM Country Tracks	25
