= Small Time Laboring Man =

Single by George Jones

from the album Cup of Loneliness
- B-side: "Well It's Alright"
- Released: 1968
- Recorded: 1968
- Genre: Country
- Length: 2:30
- Label: Musicor
- Songwriters: George Jones, Earl Montgomery
- Producer: Pappy Daily

George Jones singles chronology
"Say It's Not You" (1968)	"Small Time Laboring Man" (1968)	""As Long as I Live""

"Small Time Laboring Man" (sometimes called "Small Town Laboring Man") is a song by George Jones. It was composed by Jones and Earl Montgomery and released as a single on the Musicor label in 1968.

== Background ==
Although Jones had scored several Top 10 hits in 1967 and 1968 (including the #1 hit "Walk Through This World with Me"), "Small Time Laboring Man" charted at number 35. The maudlin ballad, which tells the story of a man who "toils and sweats" for "a dollar an hour, eight hours a day," contained gospel elements tinged with patriotism ("I'd fight for my country with my callous hands") and Jones typically committed, heartfelt vocal, but the single may have been too dour for even the conservative country audience, with Nick Tosches commenting in his article "The Devil in George Jones" in 1994, "The late sixties...were a strange time for Jones. America was adrift in a fluorescent cloud of patchouli-scented ahimsa, and Jones, in his crew cut and his Nudie Cohn suits, seemed hopelessly out of sync." In an attempt to align himself with the times, Jones would make a rare digression from straight country and record the Montgomery protest song "Unwanted Babies," a folk song that George detested and released under the pseudonym Glen Patterson. "Small Time Laboring Man" did not go completely unnoticed, however; in a Rolling Stone interview in 1969, Bob Dylan was asked what he thought was the best song released in the previous year and he replied, "George Jones had one called 'Small Town Laboring Man'."
