= Nothing Ever Hurt Me (Half as Bad as Losing You) (song) =

Single by George Jones

from the album Nothing Ever Hurt Me (Half as Bad as Losing You)
- B-side: "Wine (You've Used Me Long Enough)"
- Released: 1973
- Recorded: 1973
- Genre: Country
- Length: 2:19
- Label: Epic
- Songwriter(s): Bobby Braddock
- Producer(s): Billy Sherrill

George Jones singles chronology
"What My Woman Can't Do" (1973)	"Nothing Ever Hurt Me (Half as Bad as Losing You)" (1973)	"Once You've Had the Best" (1973)

"Nothing Ever Hurt Me (Half as Bad as Losing You)" is a novelty song written by Bobby Braddock and recorded by American country singer George Jones. The song was recorded at a blistering speed and contains tongue twisting lyrics about a country boy for whom nothing ever goes right. The song would reach #7 on the charts. In the liner notes to the 1982 Jones compilation Anniversary – 10 Years of Hits, producer Billy Sherrill writes that Jones rarely performed the song live because he could never remember all the words. Jones would record several more Braddock compositions, including "He Stopped Loving Her Today."
