= Still the Same Ole Me =

Studio album by George Jones
- Released: November 1981
- Recorded: April 1981
- Studio: Columbia, Nashville
- Genre: Country
- Length: 26:43
- Label: Epic
- Producer: Billy Sherrill

George Jones chronology
I Am What I Am (1980)	Still the Same Ole Me (1981)	Shine On (1983)

Singles from Still the Same Ole Me
- 1. "Someday My Day Will Come" Released: April 1979; 2. "Still Doin' Time" Released: September 1981; 3. "Same Ole Me" Released: January 1982

Professional ratings
Review scores
Source	Rating
AllMusic	3/5 stars

Still the Same Ole Me is an album by American country music singer George Jones, released in 1981 (see 1981 in country music) on the Epic Records label.

== Track listing ==
No.	Title	Writer(s)	Length
1.	"Still Doin' Time"	Michael P. Heeney, John E. Moffat	2:50
2.	"Couldn't Love Have Picked a Better Place to Die"	Curly Putman, Bucky Jones	3:21
3.	"I Won't Need You Anymore"	Troy Seals, Max D. Barnes	3:19
4.	"Together Alone"	Bobby Braddock	3:00
5.	"Daddy Come Home (Georgette and Daddy)"	Bobby Braddock	2:25
6.	"You Can't Get the Hell Out of Texas"	John Hadley, Jim Stafford	2:38
7.	"Good Ones and Bad Ones"	Joe Chambers, Larry Jenkins	2:47
8.	"Girl, You Sure Know How to Say Goodbye"	Tom T. Hall	2:59
9.	"Someday My Day Will Come"	Earl Montgomery, Chris Ryder, V. L. Haywood	2:33
10.	"Same Ole Me" (featuring The Oak Ridge Boys)	Paul Overstreet	2:51

== Certifications ==
Region	Certification
United States (RIAA)	Gold
