= Bartender's Blues (album) =

Studio album by George Jones
- Released: 1978
- Recorded: October 1977
- Studio: Columbia (Nashville, Tennessee)
- Genre: Country
- Length: 28:12
- Label: Epic KE-35414
- Producer: Billy Sherrill

George Jones chronology
I Wanta Sing (1977)	Bartender's Blues (1978)	My Very Special Guests (1979)

Singles from Bartender's Blues
- 1. "Bartender's Blues" Released: January 11, 1978; 2. "I'll Just Take It Out in Love" Released: June 20, 1978

Baretender's Blues is an album by American country music artist George Jones, released in 1978 on the Epic Records label. It was re-released on CD on the Razor & Tie label in 1996.

== Reception ==
Professional ratings
Review scores
Source	Rating
AllMusic	2/5 stars

While praising Jones's singing, Stephen Thomas Erlewine of AllMusic laments the dated production ("soft rock with its electric pianos") but cites the main flaw as "its uneven material. Apart from the excellent weeper 'I'll Just Take It Out in Love,' the strongest song is the title track, which is James Taylor's impression of what life in a honky tonk must be. Despite the occasional weak song, Jones gives it his all throughout the record, which by and large keeps the album entertaining." Writing about the title track in The New Yorker, Ian Crouch asserted, "His rendering of the chorus, with its 'four walls around me to hold my life,' may be the best expression of his incredible vocal gifts—despair and joy fighting out their eternal battle."

== Track listing ==
1. "Bartender's Blues" (James Taylor) – 3:47
2. "I'll Just Take It Out in Love" (Bob McDill) – 3:12
3. "If You Loved a Liar (You'd Hug My Neck)" (Earl Montgomery, George Jones) – 2:24
4. "Ain't Your Memory Got No Pride at All" (Red Lane, Boyce Porter, Bucky Jones) – 2:37
5. "I Gave It All Up for You" (Earl Montgomery, Terry Skinner) – 2:21
6. "I Don't Want No Stranger Sleepin' in My Bed" (George Jones, "Wild" Bill Emerson) – 2:58
7. "I Ain't Got No Business Doin' Business Today" (Danny Morrison, Johnny Slate) – 2:54
8. "Leaving Love All Over the Place" (Lathan Hudson) – 2:53
9. "(When Your Phone Don't Ring) It'll Be Me" (Hank Cochran, Glenn Martin) – 2:27
10. "Julianne" (Roger Bowling, "Wild" Bill Emerson) – 2:39

== Personnel ==
- George Jones – vocals, guitar
- Billy Sanford – guitar
- Reggie Young – guitar
- Phil Baugh – guitar
- Pete Drake – pedal steel guitar
- Henry Strzelecki – bass
- Jimmy Isbell – drums
- Hargus "Pig" Robbins – piano
- James Taylor – vocals on "Bartender's Blues"

Technical

- Lou Bradley, Ron Reynolds – engineer
- Virginia Team – design
- Clark Thomas – photography
