= Memories of Us (song) =

Single by George Jones

from the album Memories of Us
- B-side: "I Just Don't Give a Damn"
- Released: 1975
- Recorded: 1975
- Genre: Country
- Length: 3:16
- Label: Epic
- Songwriter(s): Dave Kirby, Glenn Martin
- Producer(s): Billy Sherrill

George Jones singles chronology
"These Days (I Barely Get By)" (1974)	"Memories of Us" (1975)	"The Battle" (1976)

"Memories of Us" is a song by American country singer George Jones. The sad, nostalgic ballad was composed by Dave Kirby and Glenn Martin and became the title track of Jones' 1975 LP - his first after divorcing Tammy Wynette. In the liner notes to the 1982 best of package Anniversary – 10 Years of Hits, producer Billy Sherrill singles the track out as one of his personal favorites but it failed to even crack the Top 20, peaking at #21. The single marked the beginning of a commercial decline for Jones, who was about to fall headlong into an alcoholic and drug-fueled fog for most of the next decade; between 1975 and 1980, he would score only 2 Top 10 solo hits.

== Charts ==
Chart (1975)	Peak position
US Billboard Hot Country Singles	21
Canadian RPM Country Tracks	20
