= Nothing Ever Hurt Me (Half as Bad as Losing You) =

Studio album by George Jones
- Released: June 1973
- Recorded: 1973
- Studios: Columbia (Nashville, Tennessee)
- Genre: Country
- Length: 28:14
- Label: Epic
- Producer: Billy Sherrill

George Jones chronology
A Picture of Me (Without You) (1973)	Nothing Ever Hurt Me (Half as Bad as Losing You) (1973)	In a Gospel Way (1974)

Singles from Nothing Ever Hurt Me (Half as Bad as Losing You)
- 1. "What My Woman Can't Do" Released: February 7, 1973; 2. "Nothing Ever Hurt Me (Half as Bad as Losing You)" Released: May 21, 1973

Professional ratings
Review scores
Source	Rating
Allmusic	5/5 stars

Nothing Ever Hurt Me (Half as Bad as Losing You) is an album by country music artist George Jones released in 1973, on the Epic Records label. It peaked at number 12 on the Billboard Country Albums chart. It is Jones' 48th Album Release.

== Reception ==
Thom Jurek of AllMusic praises the album as "a dynamite set that offered a solid look at what Jones and Sherrill were capable of - and delivered - in the coming years" and calls Jones's interpretation of Don Gibson's "Made For The Blues" and Frizzell's "Mom and Dad's Waltz" "solid, tender honky tonk ballads that offer the deep, raw emotion in the singer's best material."

== Track listing ==
No.	Title	Writer(s)	Length
1.	"Nothing Ever Hurt Me (Half as Bad as Losing You)"	Bobby Braddock	2:19
2.	"You're Looking at a Happy Man"	George Jones, Carmol Taylor	2:08
3.	"Never Having You"	Tom T. Hall	2:33
4.	"Made for the Blues"	Don Gibson	2:36
5.	"What's Your Mama's Name?"	Dallas Frazier, Earl Montgomery	2:39
6.	"Mom and Dad's Waltz"	Lefty Frizzell	2:50
7.	"You'll Never Grow Old (To Me)"	Tammy Wynette, Earl Montgomery	2:52
8.	"What My Woman Can't Do"	Jones, Billy Sherrill, Earl Montgomery	2:35
9.	"My Loving Wife"	Earl Montgomery	2:46
10.	"Love Lives Again"	Carmol Taylor, George Richey, Norris Wilson	2:21
11.	"Wine (You've Used Me Long Enough)"	Jones, Tammy Wynette	2:35

== Charts ==
Chart (1973)	Peak position
US Top Country Albums (Billboard)	12

== Charting Singles ==
Single	Chart	Peak position
What My Woman Can't Do	U.S. Billboard Hot Country Singles	6
Nothing Ever Hurt Me (Half as Bad as Losing You)	U.S. Billboard Hot Country Singles	8
Nothing Ever Hurt Me (Half as Bad as Losing You)	Canadian Country (RPM)	8
