= The Battle (George Jones album) =

Studio album by George Jones
- Released: February 1976
- Recorded: October 1975
- Studio: Columbia (Nashville, Tennessee)
- Genre: Country
- Length: 27:59
- Label: Epic
- Producer: Billy Sherrill

George Jones chronology
Memories of Us (1975)	The Battle (1976)	Alone Again (1976)

Singles from The Battle
- 1. "The Battle" Released: January 1976; 2. "You Always Look Your Best (Here in My Arms)" Released: May 1976

The Battle is an album by American country music artist George Jones released in 1976 on the Epic Records label. It is Jones' 52nd album.

== Reception ==
Professional ratings
Review scores
Source	Rating
Allmusic	link
Christgau's Record Guide	B
The Rolling Stone Record Guide	5/5 stars

Thom Jurek of AllMusic calls The Battle "a gorgeous record" and contends that "while its title suggested a concept album, it is anything but. In fact, it's an exercise in the conflict of emotions from sadness and loss, denial, anger, and grace. And everything here is a love song."

== Track listing ==
1. "The Battle" (Norro Wilson, George Richey, Linda Kimball)
2. "I Can't Get Over What Lovin' You Has Done" (Jody Emerson)
3. "Baby, There's Nothing Like You" (George Jones, Earl Montgomery)
4. "You Always Look Your Best (Here in My Arms)" (Curly Putman, Mike Kosser, Steve Pippin)
5. "The Nighttime (And My Baby)" (Norro Wilson, Carmol Taylor, Joe Stampley)
6. "I'll Come Back" (Earl Montgomery)
7. "Wean Me" (Jones, Tammy Wynette)
8. "Love Coming Down" (Jerry Chesnut)
9. "Billy Ray Wrote a Song" (Hank Cochran, Glenn Martin)
10. "I Still Sing the Old Songs" (David Allan Coe)
