= We Can Make It =

We Can Make It may refer to:

- George Jones (We Can Make It), a 1972 album by George Jones, or the title song
- We Can Make It (Peters and Lee album), 1973
- We Can Make It!, a 2007 song by Arashi
- "We Can Make It", a song performed by Johnny Tillotson, Tommy Roe and Brian Hyland for the soundtrack of Rudolph the Red-Nosed Reindeer: The Movie
