= Stranger in the House (song) =

Late-1970s song written by Elvis Costello

Song by George Jones, Elvis Costello

from the album My Very Special Guests
- Released: 1979
- Recorded: 18 July 1978
- Genre: Country
- Length: 3:37
- Label: Epic
- Songwriter: Elvis Costello
- Producer: Billy Sherrill

"Stranger in the House" is a song written by English musician Elvis Costello. Costello recorded the song as a duet with country music star George Jones in the summer of 1978 for Jones' 1979 album My Very Special Guests. Costello recorded an earlier solo version which surfaced as a free 7" single with the first 1000 copies of his second album This Year's Model which was released in the United Kingdom in March 1978. A third version was recorded with the Attractions for a John Peel session on 23 October 1978. According to Holly Jones-Warren's liner notes to the 2005 Legacy Records reissue of My Very Special Guests, Costello wrote the song specifically with Jones in mind, with the new wave star stating, "George Jones was my guiding light whenever I wrote in the country idiom".

According to biographer David Gouldstone, "Stranger in the House" marked Costello's first exploration into country music, which music professor James E. Perone states "paved the way" for his later forays on albums such as Almost Blue (1981). Perone states that the song demonstrates that "Costello understood the country genre musically and lyrically," explaining that "Costello's character equates his home with a transient hotel, as he explains his sense of disconnection and alienation from his family; this rings true as a metaphor that could easily be expected in an American country song. Rolling Stone critic Dave Marsh described the song as a "lovely but bizarre country oddity."

Costello said of his duet with Jones that "it was just a happy coincidence that they happened to be doing a duets record and I got invited to sing with him. Truthfully, I wish I had a George Jones solo recording of that song because my contribution to the record is probably the low point of it."
