= Old King Kong =

Single by George Jones

from the album I Wanta Sing
- B-side: "It's a 10-33 (Let's Get Jesus on the Line)"
- Released: 1977
- Recorded: 1977
- Genre: Country, country rock
- Length: 2:16
- Label: Epic
- Songwriter(s): Sammy Lyons
- Producer(s): Billy Sherrill

George Jones singles chronology
"Her Name Is" (1976)	"Old King Kong" (1977)	"If I Could Put Them All Together (I'd Have You)" (1977)

"Old King Kong" is a novelty country song written by Sammy Lyons and recorded by American country singer George Jones. After several disappointing chart performances, Jones had a Top 5 hit with the tongue-in-cheek "Her Name Is" in 1976, and the up tempo novelty "Old King Kong" appeared to be producer Billy Sherrill's attempt to continue the trend. However, it flopped miserably, only making it to #34 on the Billboard country singles chart. Jones personal life at the time did not bode well for a successful solo career; in December 1976, he was sued for drunkenly assaulting two women in Nashville and, in February 1977, a federal tax lien was filed against his Alabama residence. Ex-wife Tammy Wynette was also after him for unpaid alimony and Jones, who began missing shows at an astonishing rate, filed for bankruptcy.

== Charts ==
Chart (1977)	Peak position
U.S. Billboard Hot Country Singles	34
