= The Grand Tour (album) =

Studio album by George Jones
- Released: 7 August 1974
- Recorded: January 1974
- Studio: Columbia (Nashville, Tennessee)
- Genre: Country
- Length: 28:35
- Label: Epic
- Producer: Billy Sherrill

George Jones chronology
In a Gospel Way (1974)	The Grand Tour (1974)	The Best of George Jones (1975)

Singles from The Grand Tour
- 1. "Once You've Had the Best" Released: October 24, 1973; 2. "The Grand Tour" Released: May 3, 1974

The Grand Tour is an album by the American country music artist George Jones, released in 1974 as his fifth album for Epic Records. It peaked at #11 on the Billboard Country Albums chart and contained the hit title track, which reached a peak of #1 in August 1974. It is Jones’ 50th Album Release.

== Reception ==
The Grand Tour is considered one of Jones's greatest albums. Thom Jurek of AllMusic gives the album a perfect score (5 out of 5) and writes: The Grand Tour was "a watershed for Jones, boasting the title track as one of the most devastating country singles ever issued that came so close to crossing over it was being played on some adult pop stations along with Sinatra, Bennett, Dionne Warwick, and Herb Alpert...Ultimately, this is Jones' country, the kind of country music that is pure yet as sophisticated as Sherrill wanted it to be."

== Track listing ==
1. "The Grand Tour" (Norro Wilson, George Richey, Carmol Taylor) – 3:06
2. "Darlin'" (Ray Griff) – 2:05
3. "Pass Me By (If You're Only Passing Through)" (H. B. Hall) – 2:59
4. "She'll Love the One She's With" (Hank Cochran, Grady Martin) – 2:45
5. "Once You've Had the Best" (Johnny Paycheck) – 2:40
6. "The Weatherman" (Norro Wilson, George Richey, Carmol Taylor) – 2:14
7. "Borrowed Angel" (Mel Street) – 3:04
8. "She Told Me So" (Bobby Braddock) – 2:54
9. "Mary Don't Go 'Round" (Earl Montgomery, J. R. Richards) – 2:06
10. "Who Will I Be Loving Now" (Carmol Taylor, Agnes Wilson) – 2:30
11. "Our Private Life" (George Jones, Tammy Wynette) – 2:20
