= Memories of Us =

Studio album by George Jones
- Released: September 7, 1975
- Recorded: April 1975
- Studio: Columbia (Nashville, Tennessee)
- Genre: Country
- Label: Epic
- Producer: Billy Sherrill

George Jones chronology
The Best of George Jones (1975)	Memories of Us (1975)	The Battle (1976)

Singles from Memories of Us
- 1. "Memories of Us" Released: June 13, 1975

Professional ratings
Review scores
Source	Rating
Allmusic	4.5/5 stars

Memories of Us is an album by American country music artist George Jones, released in 1975 on the Epic Records label. It peaked at #43 on the Billboard Country Albums chart. It is Jones’ 51st Album Release.

== Track listing ==
1. "Memories of Us" (Dave Kirby, Glenn Martin)
2. "Touch of Wilderness" (Jody Emerson)
3. "A Goodbye Joke" (Earl Montgomery, Charlene Montgomery, George Jones)
4. "What I Do Best" (Roger Bowling)
5. "She Should Belong to Me" (George Jones, Tammy Wynette)
6. "Have You Seen My Chicken" (Earl Montgomery, Jody Emerson)
7. "She Once Made a Romeo Cry" ("Wild" Bill Emerson, Jody Emerson)
8. "Bring on the Clowns" (Billy Sherrill, George Jones, Tammy Wynette)
9. "Hit and Run" (Earl Montgomery)
10. "I Just Don't Give a Damn" (Jimmy Peppers, George Jones)
