= Cocaine & Rhinestones =

2017 country music podcast

- Genre: History of country music, Music podcast
- Language: English

Cast and voices
- Hosted by: Tyler Mahan Coe

Music
- Ending theme: "Cocaine", performed by Dick Justice (season 1) "When The Roses Bloom Again", performed by Vernon Dalhart (season 2)

Publication
- No. of episodes: 33
- Original release: October 24, 2017

Related
- Website: cocaineandrhinestones.com

Cocaine & Rhinestones is a podcast about country music history by Tyler Mahan Coe. The 14-episode first season debuted in October 2017. The show received acclaim, and in early 2018 was the top music podcast on iTunes.

Each episode focuses on some mystery about country music; first season topics included the controversy over Loretta Lynn's recording of "The Pill", the meaning of Merle Haggard's "Okie from Muskogee", and the musical relationship of the Louvin Brothers. The show's exhaustively researched episodes present a glimpse inside the machinery of country music, tell colorful stories about recording artists, songs, and songwriters, and evaluate competing versions of the truth. While the show is not overtly political, sexism in the country music industry is a recurring theme.

Episodes can be longer than 90 minutes, and each features a "liner notes" commentary segment at the end, with Coe providing "clarifications and corrections" as well as bibliographical information. In addition to hosting, Coe is the sole researcher, writer and producer, without outside sponsorship. Coe said each episode in Season 1 took "about 100 hours" to complete.

Coe is the son of country musician David Allan Coe and grew up in the industry. He was the rhythm guitarist for his father's band from the age of 15 until 2013, when the elder Coe fired the entire band "in a fit of pique". In 2018, while working on the second season of the show, Coe was granted access to the archives of the Country Music Hall of Fame. Season two, which focuses on George Jones, debuted in April 2021, with episodes being released every two weeks. Coe also hosts the Your Favorite Band Sucks podcast alongside Mark Mosley. The podcast's second season was adapted into a book, Cocaine & Rhinestones: A History of George Jones and Tammy Wynette, featuring illustrations by Wayne White, published in September 2024.

== Episodes ==
=== Season One ===
Ep. number	Title	Length	Release date
1	Ernest Tubb: The Texas Defense	48:57	October 24, 2017
2	The Pill: Why Was Loretta Lynn Banned?	52:08	October 31, 2017
3	The Murder Ballad of Spade Cooley	1 hour	November 7, 2017
4	Bobbie Gentry: Exit Stage Left	1 hour and 44 minutes	November 14, 2017
5	Breaking Down Merle Haggard's "Okie from Muskogee"	1 hour and 4 minutes	November 21, 2017
6	The Louvin Brothers: Running Wild	1 hour and 37 minutes	November 28, 2017
7	"Harper Valley PTA," Part 1: Shelby S. Singleton	1 hour and 11 minutes	December 5, 2017
8	"Harper Valley PTA," Part 2: Jeannie C. Riley	1 hour and 15 minutes	December 12, 2017
9	"Harper Valley PTA," Part 3: Tom T. Hall	1 hour and 32 minutes	December 19, 2017
10	Buck Owens & Don Rich, Part 1: Open Up Your Heart	1 hour and 31 minutes	December 26, 2017
11	Don Rich & Buck Owens, Part 2: Together Again	1 hour and 58 minutes	January 2, 2018
12	Wynonna	1 hour and 57 minutes	January 9, 2018
13	Rusty and Doug Kershaw: The Cajun Way	2 hours and 1 minute	January 16, 2018
14	Ralph Mooney: The Sound of Country Music	1 hour and 25 minutes	January 23, 2018
15	Season One Q&A	1 hour and 22 minutes	February 6, 2018

=== Season Two ===
Ep. number	Title	Length	Release date
1	Starday Records: The Anti-Nashville Sound	2 hours and 13 minutes	April 20, 2021
2	Owen Bradley's Nashville Sound	2 hours and 17 minutes	May 4, 2021
3	The Nashville A-Team	2 hours and 16 minutes	May 18, 2021
4	White Lightning	1 hour and 39 minutes	June 1, 2021
5	Wandering Soul: George Jones, Starday Recording Artist	1 hour and 30 minutes	June 15, 2021
6	All to Pieces: George Jones, Phase II	1 hour and 41 minutes	June 29, 2021
7	Pappy Daily, Gene Pitney and How George Jones Came to Be on Musicor	2 hours and 16 minutes	July 13, 2021
8	Dallas Frazier: Can't Get There From Here	2 hours and 1 minute	July 27, 2021
9	Loneliness Surrounds: Virginia Wynette Pugh	1 hour and 43 minutes	August 10, 2021
10	Stand by Your Man: The Anti-Feminist Manifesto	1 hour and 54 minutes	October 26, 2021
11	Being Together: The George Jones & Tammy Wynette Story	1 hour and 50 minutes	November 9, 2021
12	Loved It Away: Tammy Wynette, On Her Own	1 hour and 35 minutes	November 23, 2021
13	Billy Sherrill’s Nashville Sound	2 hours and 48 minutes	December 7, 2021
14	Divorce/Death: He Stopped Loving Her Today, The Grand Tour & A Good Year for the Roses	2 hours and 14 minutes	December 21, 2021
15	Hell Stays Open All Night Long: George Jones, Phase III	1 hour and 47 minutes	January 4, 2022
16	Another Lonely Song: The Tammy Wynette & George Richey Story	2 hours and 20 minutes	January 18, 2022
17	Choices: George Jones' Last Run	2 hours and 43 minutes	February 1, 2022
18	Glenn	1 hour and 36 minutes	February 15, 2022

== See also ==
- Music podcast
- List of history podcasts
