= We Both Walk =

Single by Lorrie Morgan

from the album Something in Red
- B-side: "Faithfully"
- Released: March 13, 1991
- Recorded: 1990
- Genre: Country
- Length: 3:05
- Label: RCA Nashville
- Songwriters: Tom Shapiro; Chris Waters
- Producer: Richard Landis

Lorrie Morgan singles chronology
"'Til a Tear Becomes a Rose" (1990)	"We Both Walk" (1991)	"A Picture of Me (Without You)" (1991)

"We Both Walk" is a song written by Tom Shapiro and Chris Waters, and recorded by American country music artist Lorrie Morgan. It was released in March 1991 as the first single from her album Something in Red. The song reached #3 on the Billboard Hot Country Singles & Tracks chart in June 1991.

== Chart performance ==
Chart (1991)	Peak position
Canada Country Singles (RPM)	3
US Hot Country Songs (Billboard)	3

=== Year-end charts ===
Chart (1991)	Position
Canada Country Tracks (RPM)	61
US Country Songs (Billboard)	25
