= Except for Monday =

Single by Lorrie Morgan

from the album Something in Red
- B-side: "Hand Over Your Heart"
- Released: October 1991
- Genre: Country
- Length: 2:56
- Label: RCA Nashville
- Songwriter: Reed Nielsen
- Producer: Richard Landis

Lorrie Morgan singles chronology
"A Picture of Me (Without You)" (1991)	"Except for Monday" (1991)	"Something in Red" (1992)

"Except for Monday" is a song written by Reed Nielsen and recorded by American country music artist Lorrie Morgan. It was released in October 1991 as the third single from her album Something in Red. The song reached number 4 on the Billboard Hot Country Singles & Tracks chart and number 7 on the RPM Country Tracks chart in Canada.

== Chart performance ==
Chart (1991–1992)	Peak position
Canada Country Singles (RPM)	7
US Hot Country Songs (Billboard)	4

=== Year-end charts ===
Chart (1992)	Position
Canada Country Tracks (RPM)	84
US Country Songs (Billboard)	26
