= Someday My Day Will Come =

Single by George Jones

from the album Still the Same Ole Me
- B-side: "We Oughta Be Ashamed"
- Released: 1979
- Recorded: 1979
- Genre: Country
- Length: 2:32
- Label: Epic
- Songwriters: Earl Montgomery, Chris Ryder, V.L. Haywood
- Producer: Billy Sherrill

George Jones singles chronology
"Bartender's Blues" (1978)	"Someday My Day Will Come" (1979)	"He Stopped Loving Her Today" (1980)

"Someday My Day Will Come" is a song by American country singer George Jones. Released as a single by Epic Records in 1979, it reached number 22 on the charts but did not make it into the top 20.

== Background ==
The song, an expression of eternal optimism in the face of great hardship, was poignant considering George's life was a mess at the time; addicted to alcohol and cocaine and missing shows at an astonishing rate, lawsuits from promoters as well as other legal issues were piling up.

In his memoir George Jones: The Life and Times of a Honky Tonk Legend, Bob Allen recalls that in February 1979 a federal bankruptcy judge ordered that "the artist and songwriter's royalties allegedly owed to George by CBS Records, United Artists Records, Pappy Daily, and the Broadcast Music Institute (royalties which, in most cases, he'd already managed to sign away) be turned over to the court and applied towards payment of the beleaguered singer's $1.5 million in debts."

Producer Billy Sherrill shrewdly chose songs like "Someday My Day Will Come" that appeared to reflect the turmoil in Jones' personal life, as he had done with his duets with ex-wife Tammy Wynette and later songs like "If Drinkin' Don't Kill Me (Her Memory Will)" and "I've Aged Twenty Years in Five." For his part, Jones didn't care, admitting in his 1995 autobiography, "The press had made my personal life so public so frequently for so long that I didn't care what people knew, didn't know, or thought they knew about me. If folks bought my records because they thought I was breaking down, which I happened to be, then so be it."
