= A Picture of Me (Without You) (album) =

Studio album by George Jones
- Released: November 1972
- Genre: Country
- Label: Epic
- Producer: Billy Sherrill

George Jones chronology
George Jones (We Can Make It) (1972)	A Picture of Me (Without You) (1972)	Nothing Ever Hurt Me (Half as Bad as Losing You) (1973)

Singles from A Picture of Me (Without You)
- 1. "A Picture of Me (Without You)" Released: October 1972

Professional ratings
Review scores
Source	Rating
Allmusic	5/5 stars

A Picture of Me (Without You) is an album by American country music singer George Jones. It was released in 1972 on the Epic Records label. The release was Jones' 47th studio album, his second solo LP for Epic Records, and is also one of four albums released by the singer during the year 1972 (two as a solo artist, and two duet albums with his wife Tammy Wynette).

The album's title track was the only single release from it, peaking at #5 on the Billboard country singles charts.

== Reception ==
Mark Beming of AllMusic writes of the album: "...while Sherrill's fondness for glossy surfaces wouldn't immediately seem compatible with Jones' hard honky tonk soul, he managed to give these sessions a low-key, late-night feel that was a fine match for the bluesy tone of Jones' voice...If you want to know why Gram Parsons called Jones 'the king of broken hearts,' one spin of this album will tell you all you need to know."

== Track listing ==
No.	Title	Writer(s)	Length
1.	"A Picture of Me (Without You)"	Norro Wilson, George Richey	2:30
2.	"Man Worth Lovin' You"	Earl Montgomery	2:36
3.	"She Knows What She's Crying About"	John Riggs	2:41
4.	"Second Handed Flowers"	Tom T. Hall	3:10
5.	"That Singing Friend of Mine"	Curly Putman	3:02
6.	"She Loves Me (Right Out of My Mind)"	Freddy Weller, Spooner Oldham	2:56
7.	"Tomorrow Never Comes"	Ernest Tubb, Johnny Bond	2:14
8.	"Another Way to Say Goodbye"	Jean Chapel	2:43
9.	"On the Back Row"	Jerry Chesnut, Norro Wilson	3:00
10.	""Let There Be a Woman"	(Jacqueline Wellman	2:26
11.	"We Found a Match"	Earl Montgomery	2:44

== Chart Performance ==
=== Weekly charts ===
Chart (1972)	Peak position
US Top Country Albums (Billboard)	3

=== Year-end charts ===
Chart (1973)	Position
US Top Country Albums (Billboard)	40

=== Singles ===
Year	Single	Peak chart positions	
Year	Single	US Country	CAN Country
1972	A Piucture of Me (Without You)	5	13
