= The Door (George Jones song) =

Single by George Jones

from the album The Best of George Jones
- B-side: "Wean Me"
- Released: October 1974
- Genre: Country
- Length: 2:40
- Label: Epic
- Songwriters: Billy Sherrill; Norro Wilson
- Producer: Billy Sherrill

George Jones singles chronology
"The Grand Tour" (1974)	"The Door" (1974)	"These Days (I Barely Get By)" (1974)

"The Door" is a song written by Billy Sherrill and Norro Wilson, and recorded by American country music artist George Jones. It was released in October 1974 as the first single from the album The Best of George Jones. "The Door" was George Jones' sixth number one on the country chart as a solo artist. The single stayed a single week at number one and would spend a total of ten weeks on the country chart.

== Recording and composition ==
Jones had scored his first solo #1 hit single in seven years with "The Grand Tour" in 1974, the first of several extraordinary performances producer Billy Sherrill would coax out of the temperamental singer in the long years ahead. "The Door" tells the story of a former soldier who, despite being haunted by the sights and sounds he endured in battle, confesses that he was most traumatized by the sound of the door closing when the woman he loved walked out on him:

And of earthquakes, storms and guns and war
Lord, nothin' has ever hurt me more
Than that lonely sound
The closing of the door

In the liner notes to the Jones retrospective Anniversary – 10 Years of Hits, Sherrill divulges that it was his office door that was used for the sound effect on the recording, since no other door produced the appropriate sound. The song went to #1 on the Billboard country singles chart, but Jones speculated later that it might have been bigger had it not been for its touchy subject matter in light of the Vietnam War, recalling in the 1994 video release Golden Hits:

"I don't think it quite got to the whole entire public because of the type of song that it was. It was a number one song, but...a lot of it was about the war...It was the type of song people didn't wanna really talk about that much."

The song displays Sherrill's countrypolitan approach to recording, laden with strings and dramatic crescendos which add drama to the despairing vocal. As Rich Kienzle states in his essay for the 1994 Sony retrospective The Essential George Jones: The Spirit of Country, "Not even the symphonic strings that Billy Sherrill, his Epic Records producer, often added to George's records could submerge the voice. It still held the listener captive." Despite a shaky start with Sherrill at Epic, Jones was back on top in 1974, recalling in his 1995 autobiography, "That year I had three records that together spent forty-two weeks on the Billboard country chart, including 'The Telephone Call.' 'The Grand Tour' and 'The Door' went to number one. Tammy (Wynette) and I released two more songs that together spent twenty-five weeks on the chart. My career was red-hot, and our duet career was pretty warm."

== Chart performance ==
Chart (1974–1975)	Peak position
U.S. Billboard Hot Country Singles	1
Canadian RPM Country Tracks	1

== See also ==
- List of anti-war songs
