= Loving You Could Never Be Better =

Single by George Jones

from the album George Jones (We Can Make It)
- B-side: "Try It You'll Like It"
- Released: April 1972
- Genre: Country
- Length: 3:05
- Label: Epic
- Songwriters: Earl Montgomery, Charlene Montgomery, Betty Tate
- Producer: Billy Sherrill

George Jones singles chronology
"A Day in the Life of a Fool" (1972)	"Loving You Could Never Be Better" (1972)	"Wrapped Around Her Finger" (1972)

"Loving You Could Never Be Better" is a song written by Earl Montgomery, Charlene Montgomery and Betty Tate, and recorded by American country music artist George Jones. It was released in April 1972 as the second single from his album George Jones (We Can Make It). The song peaked at number 2 on the Billboard Hot Country Singles chart. It also reached number 1 on the RPM Country Tracks chart in Canada. The song was a good example of how producer Billy Sherrill had updated the sound of Jones' records, incorporating a laid back, R&B bass line. By drawing from such unlikely and disparate musical influences as Johann Strauss and "wall of sound" rock producer Phil Spector, he gradually began embroidering his own subtle permutations on the rather predictable fabric of country record production. "I just decided I'd do it my way, and screw 'em if they didn't like it," Jones biographer Bob Allen quotes Sherrill. "Back then, the musicians had their own repertoire of stock Nashville licks and chord progressions that would work on any song. But I often wanted something different, and I'd make 'em play it."

== Chart performance ==
Chart (1972)	Peak position
U.S. Billboard Hot Country Singles	2
Canadian RPM Country Tracks	1
