= George Jones (We Can Make It) =

Album by country music artist George Jones

Studio album by George Jones
- Released: April 1972
- Recorded: November 1971 – February 10, 1972
- Studio: Columbia (Nashville, Tennessee)
- Genre: Country
- Length: 28:30
- Label: Epic
- Producer: Billy Sherrill

George Jones chronology
Sings the Great Songs of Leon Payne (1971)	George Jones (1972)	A Picture of Me (Without You) (1973)

Singles from George Jones
- 1. "We Can Make It / One of These Days" Released: February 12, 1972; 2. "Loving You Could Never Be Better / Try It, You'll Like It" Released: May 20, 1972

George Jones, also titled George Jones (We Can Make It) was the 1972 country music studio album released by George Jones in April 1972. The release was Jones' 46th studio album release since his debut 16 years earlier. It was the first release made on Jones' new label, Epic Records.

The album charted very well for a George Jones album, eventually rising to #10 on the country charts. The album included some other artists' hits from 1971, including Charley Pride's "Kiss an Angel Good Morning" and former Jones Boys bass player, Johnny Paycheck's "She's All I Got". Its title track "We Can Make It" peaked at #6 on the US Country chart.

== Track listing ==
Side One
No.	Title	Writer(s)	Length
1.	"We Can Make It"	Billy Sherrill, Glenn Sutton	2:06
2.	"I'll Take To You My World"	Billy Sherrill, Glenn Sutton	3:01
3.	"Kiss An Angel Good Morning"	Ben Peters	2:10
4.	"All the Praises"	Carmol Taylor, Jenny Strickland	2:36
5.	"She's All I Got"	Gary Bonds, Jerry Williams	2:52

Side Two
No.	Title	Writer(s)	Length
1.	"The Last Letter"	Rex Griffin	2:55
2.	"Loving You Could Never Be Better"	Earl Montgomery, Charlene Montgomery, Betty Tate	3:05
3.	"The King"	Roger Ferris	2:32
4.	"Try It, You'll Like It"	Jimmy Peppers	2:05
5.	"One of These Days"	Earl Montgomery	3:06
6.	"Let's Make History"	Carmol Taylor, Jenny Strickland	2:02

== Reception ==
The back of the original LP album cover contains an intro to Jones by his wife:

George is a very unique person. He is completely natural. He thinks and feels intensely. His compassion for life and people is a quality that reaches out across stage lights through studio microphones to the hearts of millions of people on a personal basis. George Jones' fans are very loyal and sincere in response to everything that he gives them (and he has given his all in this album).

— Tammy Wynette

Professional ratings
Review scores
Source	Rating
AllMusic	link

AllMusic's Chris Woodstra writes:

George Jones's first solo outing for Epic in 1972 is a rough concept album built around his own optimism and joy about his marriage to Tammy Wynette, even though cracks were already beginning to show in their real-life relationship. Jones' voice sounds mature, settled, and smooth -- a perfect combination with Billy Sherrill's decidedly non-country, slick production style.

The album went somewhat unnoticed by country listeners. The album charted at #10 (US Country).

== Chart Performance ==
=== Weekly charts ===
Chart (1972)	Peak position
US Top Country Albums (Billboard)	10

=== Year-end charts ===
Chart (1972)	Position
US Top Country Albums (Billboard)	44

=== Singles ===
Year	Single	Peak chart positions	
Year	Single	US Country	CAN Country
1972	We Can Make It	6	4
1972	Loving You Could Never Be Better	2	1
