= We Didn't See a Thing =

Single by George Jones & Ray Charles

from the album Friendship and By Request
- Released: 1984
- Recorded: 1983
- Genre: Country
- Length: 2:13
- Label: Columbia
- Songwriter: Gary Gentry
- Producer: Billy Sherrill

"We Didn't See a Thing" is a duet recorded by Ray Charles and George Jones. The Gary Gentry composition was produced by Billy Sherrill and features Chet Atkins on guitar.

== Charts ==
Chart (1984)	Peak position
US Billboard Hot Country Singles	6
Canadian RPM Country Tracks	7
