= I'll Just Take It Out in Love =

Single by George Jones

from the album Bartender's Blues
- B-side: "Leaving Love All Over the Place"
- Released: 1978
- Recorded: 1978
- Genre: Country
- Length: 3:09
- Label: Epic
- Songwriter(s): Bob McDill
- Producer(s): Billy Sherrill

George Jones singles chronology
"Bartender's Blues" (1978)	"I'll Just Take It Out in Love" (1978)	"Someday My Day Will Come" (1979)

"I'll Just Take It Out in Love" is a love song by George Jones. It rose to #11 when it was released by Epic Records in 1978. I was written by Bob McDill. The song, which celebrates domestic tranquility, could not have been more different from what Jones was experiencing in his personal life at the time; the singer was penniless, addicted to alcohol and cocaine, and quickly earning a reputation as the most undependable live performer in show business. However, despite how much he abused himself, his vocal abilities remained stellar. In 2006 he explained to Billboard magazine, "I would say 90% of the time I would be in pretty damn good shape when I went into the studio. I did have a little sense, not a whole lot. But I would still have to have a little build-up of courage, three or four drinks [throughout] the session time. I don't know, it seemed to mellow you out and relax you a little more, and you would even feel your songs better."

== Chart performance ==
Chart (1978)	Peak position
US Billboard Hot Country Singles	11
Canadian RPM Country Tracks	41
