= These Days (I Barely Get By) =

Single by George Jones
- B-side: "Baby, There's Nothing Like You"
- Released: May 1975
- Genre: Country
- Length: 3:01
- Label: Epic
- Songwriters: George Jones, Tammy Wynette
- Producer: Billy Sherrill

George Jones singles chronology
"The Door" (1974)	"These Days (I Barely Get By)" (1975)	"Memories of Us" (1975)

"These Days (I Barely Get By)" is a song by American country singer George Jones. It was one of the few compositions that Jones composed with then wife Tammy Wynette. The song was released on the 1974 Epic retrospective The Best of George Jones, which also featured "The Door." The song is unremittingly bleak, recalling Jones' earlier hit single "Things Have Gone to Pieces," and reflected the dismal relationship that now existed between Jones and Wynette, who would divorce early the following year. As Rich Kienzle recalls in the liner notes to the 1994 Sony retrospective The Essential George Jones: The Spirit of Country, "Two days after he recorded it on December 11, 1974, he left Tammy. This time she didn't withdraw her divorce petition. The divorce was granted, property divided, and George was left as one of those mournful souls he sang about in 'The Grand Tour.'"

== Chart performance ==
Chart (1974)	Peak position
U.S. Billboard Hot Country Singles	10
Canadian RPM Country Tracks	9
