= Still Doin' Time =

Single by George Jones

from the album Still the Same Ole Me
- B-side: "Good Ones and Bad Ones"
- Released: September 1981
- Genre: Country
- Length: 2:50
- Label: Epic
- Songwriter(s): Michael P. Heeney; John Moffat
- Producer(s): Billy Sherrill

George Jones singles chronology
"If Drinkin' Don't Kill Me (Her Memory Will)" (1981)	"Still Doin' Time" (1981)	"Same Ole Me" (1982)

"Still Doin' Time" is a song written by John Moffatt and Michael P. Heeney, and recorded by American country music artist George Jones. It was released in September 1981 as the first single from the album Still the Same Ole Me. The song was Jones' eighth number one country single as a solo artist. The single stayed at number one for one week and spent a total of ten weeks on the chart. Much like his previous hit single, "If Drinkin' Don't Kill Me (Her Memory Will)," the song seemed torn from the pages of the singer's life; drug-addled and paranoid, he often disappeared for weeks on end, missing show dates and confounding his managers. "Still Doin' Time," with its story of a man who is a prisoner of alcohol who cannot escape, rang true to critics and fans, many of whom were astonished at how effectively Jones could sing despite his condition. Professionally, he was thriving; in November 1982 CBS Records extended his recording contract, and in December, he was nominated in the Playboy readers' poll as the year's best male vocalist in the country and Western category.

== Charts ==
Chart (1981)	Peak position
US Hot Country Songs (Billboard)	1
Canadian RPM Country Tracks	2
