= What My Woman Can't Do =

Single by George Jones

from the album Nothing Ever Hurt Me (Half as Bad as Losing You)
- B-side: "My Loving Wife"
- Released: 1973
- Recorded: 1972
- Genre: Country
- Length: 2:34
- Label: Epic
- Songwriters: George Jones, Earl Montgomery, Billy Sherrill
- Producer: Billy Sherrill

George Jones singles chronology
| "A Picture of Me (Without You)" (1972) | "What My Woman Can't Do" (1973) | "Nothing Ever Hurt Me (Half as Bad as Losing You" (1973) |

"What My Woman Can't Do" is a song by American country singer George Jones. It became a #6 hit when it was released on Epic Records in 1973.

== Background ==
"What My Woman Can't Do" was composed by Jones, his producer Billy Sherrill and Earl "Peanut" Montgomery. The song praises the virtues of a loyal and loving wife who "brightens any room she walks inside." The memorable a cappella opening features Jones voice singing the song's hook with his own voice multi-tracked. The singer made an appearance on the television show The Midnight Special performing the song in 1973. Likely the result of his wife Tammy Wynette's influence, Jones appearance had changed enormously from a few years before, with the now plump singer wearing more formal stage attire rather than the sparkling Nudie suits from his early days and sporting a styled pompadour instead of the crew cut that had been one of his trademarks for so long.

Jerry Lee Lewis would cover the song on his 1973 LP Sometimes a Memory Ain't Enough.
