= Same Ole Me =

Single by George Jones with The Oak Ridge Boys

from the album Still the Same Ole Me
- B-side: "Together Alone"
- Released: January 1982
- Genre: Country
- Length: 2:51
- Label: Epic
- Songwriter(s): Paul Overstreet
- Producer(s): Billy Sherrill

George Jones singles chronology
| "Still Doin' Time" (1981) | "Same Ole Me" (1982) | "Shine On (Shine All Your Sweet Love on Me)" (1983) |

"Same Ole Me" is a song written by Paul Overstreet, and recorded by American country music artist George Jones with The Oak Ridge Boys. It was released in January 1982 as the second single and partial title track from Jones' album Still the Same Ole Me. The song reached number 5 on the Billboard Hot Country Singles chart and number 1 on the RPM Country Tracks chart in Canada.

The song, an anthem of survival that celebrates the companionship of true love, was released when Jones was at his hell-raising worst. In the same month of the single's release, he caused a minor riot when he failed to show for a performance in Jackson, Tennessee, resulting in the police being called when enraged fans stormed the box office to demand their money back. He was also accused of throwing a bottle through the sliding glass doors of his room at the Holiday Inn Rivermont in Memphis. Jones later commented in 1995, "I could not help but be astonished about the reverse parallel of my career and life. The more anguish I underwent in my personal life, the more my career flourished."

== Charts ==
=== Weekly charts ===
| Chart (1982) | Peak position |
|---|---|
| US Hot Country Songs (Billboard) | 5 |
| Canadian RPM Country Tracks | 1 |

=== Year-end charts ===
| Chart (1982) | Position |
|---|---|
| US Hot Country Songs (Billboard) | 22 |
