= A Picture of Me (Without You) (song) =

1972 single by George Jones

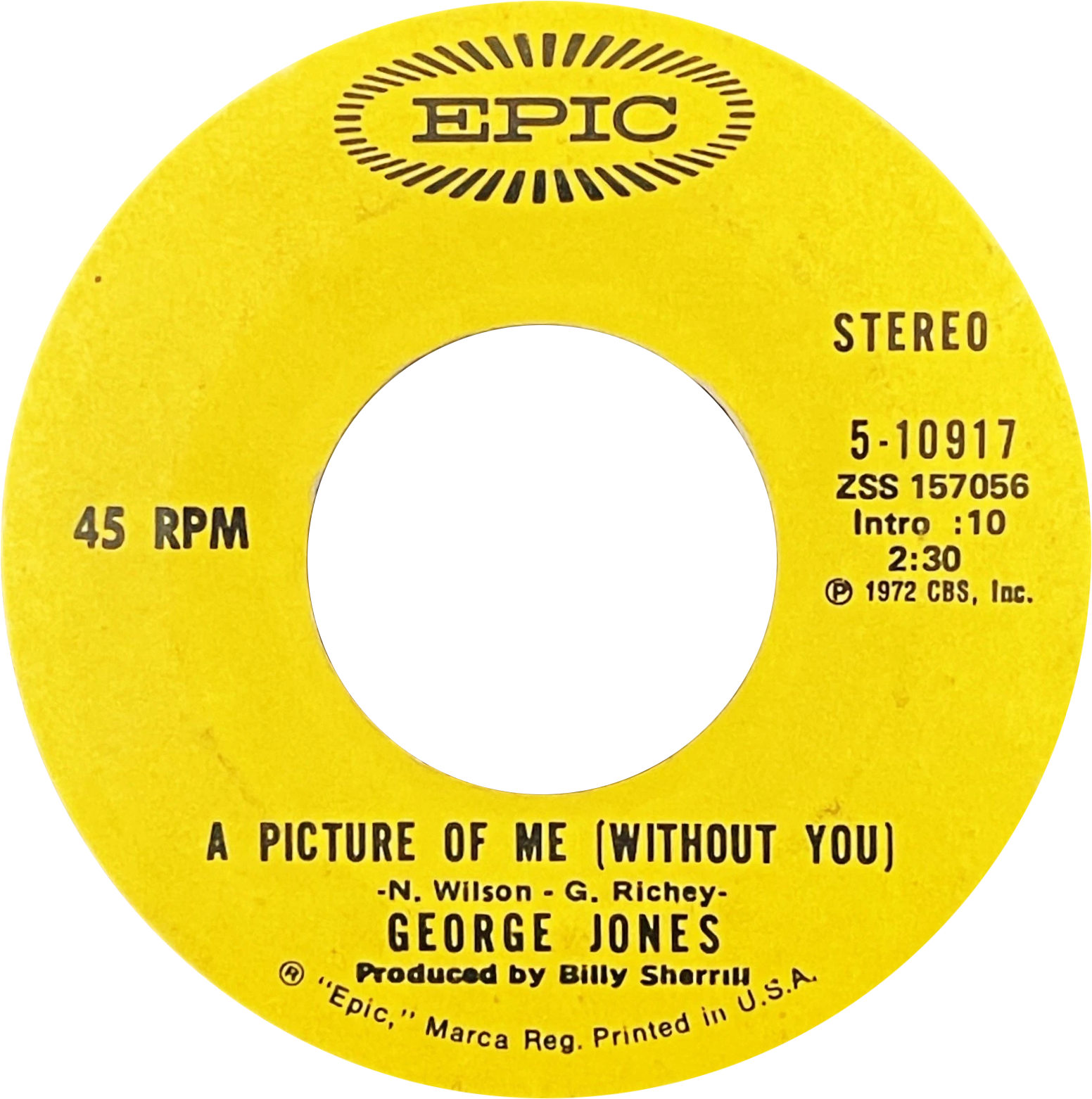
- US single of the George Jones recording

Single by George Jones

from the album A Picture of Me (Without You)
- B-side: "Man Worth Loving You"
- Released: October 1972
- Genre: Country
- Label: Epic
- Songwriters: Norro Wilson; George Richey
- Producer: Billy Sherrill

George Jones singles chronology
"Wrapped Around Her Finger" (1972)	"A Picture of Me (Without You)" (1972)	"What My Woman Can't Do" (1973)

"A Picture of Me (Without You)"
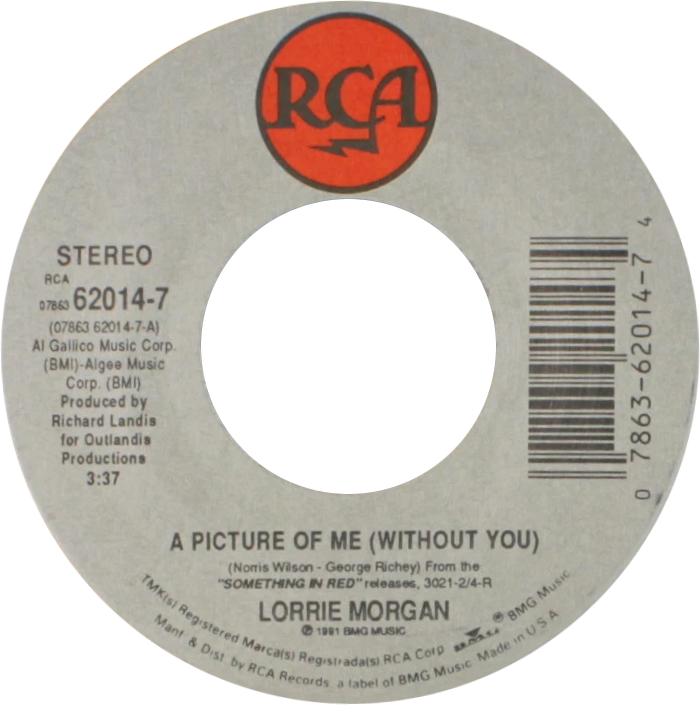
- US single of the Lorrie Morgan recording

Single by Lorrie Morgan

from the album Something in Red
- B-side: "Tears on My Pillow"
- Released: June 1991
- Genre: Country
- Length: 3:39
- Label: RCA Nashville
- Songwriters: Norro Wilson; George Richey
- Producer: Richard Landis

Lorrie Morgan singles chronology
"We Both Walk" (1991)	"A Picture of Me (Without You)" (1991)	"Except for Monday" (1991)

"A Picture of Me (Without You)" is a country music song written by Norro Wilson and George Richey.

== Background ==
According to Rich Kienzle's liner notes for the 1994 Sony retrospective The Essential George Jones: The Spirit of Country, the song was written specifically for Jones with co-writer Norro Wilson singing the song for George "imitating the Jones style to show how he wanted it sung. Even with the string arrangement, the country feel remained undiminished". The song is similar to an older Webb Pierce song called "That's Me Without You". It was originally recorded by Jones, whose version peaked at #5 on the Billboard Hot Country Singles chart in 1972. In his 1995 autobiography I Lived to Tell It All, Jones quoted lines from the song to describe his own sadness at the passing of his brother-in-law W.T. "Dub" Scroggins in 1993.

The song was covered by Lorrie Morgan on her 1991 album Something in Red. Morgan's version was released as the album's second single in June 1991 and reached #9 on the Billboard Hot Country Singles & Tracks chart in November 1991.

== Content ==
In the song, the narrator tells his lover to imagine incomplete things, like "a world where no music is playing, a church where nobody's praying, a sky with no blue, and by seeing this, she can see his picture without her by his side.

== Other versions ==
The song was also recorded in 2007, as a duet, by Vern Gosdin and Kimber Sparks; Teddy Thompson recorded this song on his album My Love of Country in 2023

== Chart performance ==
=== George Jones ===
Chart (1972)	Peak position
US Hot Country Songs (Billboard)	5
Canadian RPM Country Tracks	13

=== Lorrie Morgan ===
Chart (1991)	Peak position
Canada Country Singles (RPM)	6
US Hot Country Songs (Billboard)	9

==== Year-end charts ====
Chart (1991)	Position
Canada Country Tracks (RPM)	95
