= Bartender's Blues (song) =

1977 song by James Taylor

Single by James Taylor

from the album JT
- A-side: "Handy Man"
- Released: 1977
- Genre: Soft rock, Country
- Length: 4:10
- Label: Columbia
- Songwriter: James Taylor
- Producer: Peter Asher

"Bartender's Blues"

Single by George Jones

from the album Bartender's Blues
- B-side: "Rest in Peace"
- Released: 1977
- Recorded: 1977
- Genre: Country
- Length: 3:43
- Label: Epic
- Songwriter: James Taylor
- Producer: Billy Sherrill

George Jones singles chronology
"If I Could Put Them All Together (I'd Have You)" (1977)	"Bartender's Blues" (1977)	"I'll Just Take It Out in Love" (1978)

"Bartender's Blues" is a song written by James Taylor and first released on his 1977 album JT. It was released as the B-side of the lead single from JT, "Handy Man". It has since been covered by George Jones and other artists.

== Recording and composition ==
"Bartender's Blues" is Taylor's attempt to stretch into writing country music, which was not the typical genre Taylor wrote in. It was also an attempt to provide a different perspective from the common country music theme of a customer telling his troubles to the bartender. In this song, the bartender gets to narrate his story. The bartender feels trapped and unhappy in his job, and is looking for a "honky tonk angel" to come save him. Allmusic critic Stephen Thomas Erlewine described it as "James Taylor's impression of what life in a honky tonk must be."

Author Aaron A. Fox sees the song as capturing a classic country music metaphor of the bartender who uses his talking skills to "repair social ruptures" but in the process becomes "the very kind of fool he despises, hating his job even as he lights the cigarettes and laughs at the jokes of his customers while watching them fall down on [their] knees." Sue Simmons-McGinity remarks on how the song applies the common country music metaphor of a "honky tonk angel" who has the potential to save her man but unlike in many country songs, in "Bartender's Blues" the angel doesn't "become wife and mother to be helpful."

Linda Ronstadt sings harmony vocals and Dan Dugmore plays pedal steel guitar, while Danny Kortchmar plays guitar.

== Personnel ==
- James Taylor – lead vocals, acoustic guitar
- Linda Ronstadt – background vocals
- Danny Kortchmar – guitar
- Dan Dugmore – steel guitar
- Leland Sklar – bass guitar
- Dr. Clarence McDonald – piano
- Russell Kunkel – drums, percussion
- David Campbell – string arrangements, conductor

== Reception ==
Allmusic critic Bill Janovitz says of Taylor's performance "Taylor sounds about as convincing in his attempt at straight-country performance as he is as a Nashville songwriter; that is, not very", although he considers it a "commendable effort at writing a genuine country song" that is "beautiful musically", particularly the melody. He also praises Ronstadt's and Dugmore's performances. Taylor himself stated that "I think it's an okay but lightweight song."

Taylor's version reached #88 on the Billboard Hot Country Songs chart.

== George Jones version ==
George Jones covered "Bartender's Blues" which was released as a single in 1977. George also included the song as the title track of his 1978 album Bartender's Blues. James Taylor sang background vocals on this version. Record World said that "this James Taylor tune comes across well with [Jones'] convincing vocals" and that "Billy Sherrill's production work adds the finishing touch." Allmusic critic Stephen Thomas Erlewine calls "Bartender's Blues" the strongest song on the album. Janovitz rates Jones' performance more favorably than Taylor's, saying Jones "shows how it should be done." Janovitz praises Billy Sherrill's production of Jones' rendition, as well as Jones' vocal performance, especially in the "heart-wrenching" final verse. Author Kurt Wolff calls the song a "vocal tour de force." According to Jones' 1995 memoir I Lived to Tell It All, CBS executive Rick Blackburn first played him Taylor's demo of the song and Jones liked it immediately, remarking, "That guy is trying to sound like me." According to Jones, he recorded his part and the track was sent to Taylor, who overdubbed harmony. However, in the liner notes to the Jones compilation Anniversary - 10 Years of Hits, producer Billy Sherrill stated that he felt George over sang it, asserting that it was a case of "George Jones trying to sound like George Jones..." In a 2006 interview with Billboard's Ray Waddell, the singer addressed the comment:

Yeah, I got into it too much, I really did. At the time, that's the way I felt it, but I think I really overdone the phrasing. But I cut it again on one of my latest albums, and I don't do quite as many syllables. I got that part from Lefty [Frizzell]. He always made five syllables out of one damn word.

The song was released during the first week of 1978 and stayed on the Billboard country survey for fourteen weeks, peaking at No. 6. It was Jones' first Top 10 single in two years. It became a live mainstay for Jones and appears on many of his "best of" packages. He cut the song as a duet with Trisha Yearwood for the Bradley Barn Sessions in 1994. Amy Grant covered "Bartender's Blues" on the 2007 tribute album George Jones & Friends: 50th Anniversary Tribute Concert.

== Charts ==
James Taylor's recording reached No. 88 on the Billboard Country Singles chart in 1977. George Jones' recording reached No. 6 on the same chart in 1978.
