= The Grand Tour (song) =

1974 single by George Jones

Single by George Jones

from the album The Grand Tour
- B-side: "Our Private Life"
- Released: May 1974 (U.S.)
- Recorded: January 22, 1974
- Studio: Columbia (Nashville, Tennessee)
- Genre: Country
- Length: 3:06
- Label: Epic 33352
- Songwriters: Norro Wilson, Carmol Taylor, George Richey
- Producer: Billy Sherrill

George Jones singles chronology
"Once You've Had the Best" (1973)	"The Grand Tour" (1974)	"The Door" (1974)

"The Grand Tour" is a song made famous by country music singer George Jones. Originally released in 1974, the song was the title track to his album released that year. The song became Jones' sixth No. 1 song (fifth if only solo entries are considered) on Billboard's Hot Country Singles chart in August 1974, and was the fourth-biggest hit of the year. In 2014, Rolling Stone named the song number 38 on its "40 Saddest Country Songs of All Time".

== Recording and composition ==
The song is widely hailed as one of the finest performances in country music history. Genre historian Bill C. Malone, in his liner notes for Classic Country Music: A Smithsonian Collection, called it a "perfect matching of lyrics and performance" and "one of the great modern songs of divorce". Throughout the song, the lyrics mix the singer's tour of a home that once held many personal, private, and happy memories ("Step right up, come on in ...") with foreshadowing to set the final stop on the stroll—one of the nursery, where the singer's wife "left me without mercy, taking nothing but our baby and my heart". Prior to the clinching end scene, the singer stops at various pieces of furniture, such as an easy chair and their marital bed, to reflect on fond memories of better times. Malone wrote that "the graphic imagery permits the listener to see both the inside of the abandoned home where love has died and the interior of the narrator's mind."

Although many listeners interpret the song as being sung by a man whose wife has divorced him, Tyler Mahan Coe, on his Cocaine and Rhinestones podcast, presents the existence of an alternate interpretation, that the singer's wife died, perhaps before or during childbirth. "The wife did not leave her ring behind. She left all of her rings behind, along with every article of clothing she owned. In fact, she took none of her possessions – only the baby and his heart – because we have to leave this world the same way we enter it: with nothing but our body. And some people happen to leave while another body is growing inside of them. Since this is all very upsetting to think about, it’s not exactly a surprise how many fans try to cling to the divorce interpretation." Coe suggests there is only one lyric -- "oh, she left me without mercy" -- that seems to present hard evidence of the song being about divorce, then points out the line could be a description of the man left to live alone in a state of being where there is no hope of mercy, not a description of the wife mercilessly leaving him in the middle of an argument. Coe also points out the unborn baby's name could have been Mercy.

Songwriter Norro Wilson reflected on the success of "The Grand Tour" in The Billboard Book of Number One Country Hits: "As I recall, when George cut that song, it was the most talked-about record he'd had in an awfully long time...'The Grand Tour' is one of my proudest moments." As recounted in Rich Kienzle's 2016 Jones biography The Grand Tour, Wilson arrived at the Grand Ole Opry around the time of the record's release and "No sooner I walked in the door everybody come runnin' up to me and said, 'Jesus Christ! Have you got a monster on your hands!'...And man, I went ballistic! Everybody I ran across that night said, 'That's just gonna be a monster.' It was a really, really, really good record."

As Jones biographer Bob Allen noted in 1983, the cut was the "eureka moment" for producer Billy Sherrill: "After several years of trial and error, Sherrill was also learning how to coax rich, low-register textures out of George's powerful voice and meld them, ever more effectively, with his own heavy-handed 'Sherrillized' production style." Jones had not scored a #1 hit on the country charts since 1967's "Walk Through This World with Me", although he had reached the top of the charts with "We're Gonna Hold On", a duet with his wife Tammy Wynette.

== Chart performance ==
Chart (1974)	Peak position
U.S. Billboard Hot Country Singles	1
Canadian RPM Country Tracks	2

== Aaron Neville version ==
In 1993, soul music singer Aaron Neville recorded a cover version of "The Grand Tour". This cover reached No. 38 on the Billboard Hot Country Singles & Tracks chart, and No. 90 on the Billboard Hot 100. It was also Neville's first appearance on the country music charts. While not as commercially successful as Jones' version, Neville's was still highly acclaimed by fans and critics, resulting in a nomination for the Grammy Award for Best Male Country Vocal Performance at the 36th Annual Grammy Awards in 1994.

=== Chart performance ===
Chart (1993)	Peak position
Canada Country Singles (RPM)	58
US Billboard Hot 100	90
US Hot Country Songs (Billboard)	38

== Bibliography ==
- Malone, Bill, "Classic Country Music: A Smithsonian Collection" (booklet included with Classic Country Music: A Smithsonian Collection four-disc set). Smithsonian Institution, 1990.
- Millard, Bob, Country Music: 70 Years of America's Favorite Music, HarperCollins, New York, 1993 (ISBN 0-06-273244-7)
- Roland, Tom, The Billboard Book of Number One Country Hits, Billboard Books, Watson-Guptill Publications, New York, 1991 (ISBN 0-82-307553-2)
