= Earl Montgomery (songwriter) =

American musician and songwriter

Omar Earl "Peanut" Montgomery (born February 6, 1941, Waynesboro, Tennessee) is an American songwriter and guitarist particularly known for his contributions to country music from the late 1950s through the 1970s. As a studio guitarist he played with Bob Dylan, Etta James, Patsy Cline, and Elvis Presley. He became a Christian in 1976, and later became a Baptist minister. In 2023 he was inducted into the Alabama Music Hall of Fame, and that same year a special tribute concert was given in his honor at the Ritz Theatre in Sheffield, Alabama that was sponsored by Tennessee Valley Museum of Art.

Earl was born on a farm in Tennessee close to the state border with Alabama. His sister is country music singer-songwriter Melba Montgomery and his brother is songwriter Carl Montgomery. He wrote hit songs for singers like George Jones, Dolly Parton, and Tammy Wynette.

== Partial list of songs ==
- "I'm With the Wrong One" (1959)
- "Four-O-Thirty-Three" (1966)
- "Small Time Laboring Man" (1968)
- "Where Grass Won't Grow" (1970)
- "Right Won't Touch a Hand" (1971)
- "Loving You Could Never Be Better" (1972)
- "One of These Days" (1972)
- "We're Gonna Hold On" (1973)
- "What My Woman Can't Do" (1973)
- "What's Your Mama's Name" (1973)
- "Someday My Day Will Come" (1979)
