= George Jones =

American country musician (1931–2013)

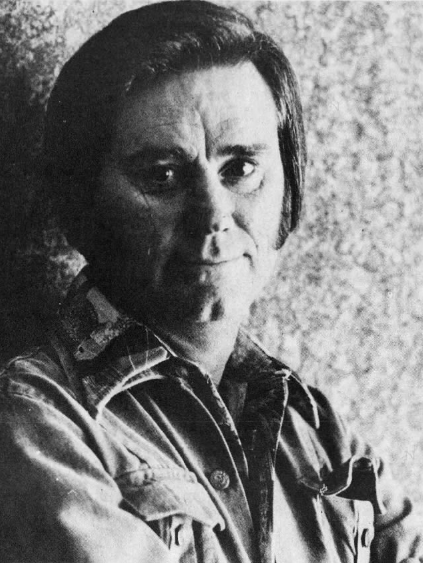
- Jones in 1976
- Born: George Glenn Jones; September 12, 1931; Saratoga, Texas, U.S.
- Died: April 26, 2013 (aged 81); Nashville, Tennessee, U.S.
- Resting place: Woodlawn Memorial Park
- Occupations: Singer; songwriter; musician
- Years active: 1947–2013
- Spouses: Dorothy Bonvillion (m. 1950; div. 1951) Shirley Ann Corley (m. 1954; div. 1968) Tammy Wynette (m. 1969; div. 1975) Nancy Sepulvado (m. 1983)
- Children: 4
- Musical career
- Also known as: King George, Thumper Jones, The Possum, No Show Jones, "The Rolls-Royce of Country Music" "King Of Country Music"
- Genres: Country; gospel
- Instruments: Acoustic guitar; vocals
- Labels: Starday; Mercury; United Artists; RCA; Musicor; Epic; MCA Nashville; Asylum; BNA Records; Bandit
- Website: georgejones.com
- Military service
- Allegiance: United States
- Branch: United States Marine Corps
- Service years: 1951–1953
- Rank: Private
- Awards: National Defense Service Medal

George Glenn Jones (September 12, 1931 – April 26, 2013) was an American country music singer, songwriter, and musician. He achieved international fame for a long list of hit records, and is well known for his distinctive voice and phrasing. For the last two decades of his life, he was frequently referred to as "the greatest living country singer" and "The Rolls-Royce of Country Music".

Born in the Big Thicket region of East Texas, Jones began learning the guitar at the age of nine and by the age of 16 began performing on KTXJ in Jasper, moving to KRIC in Beaumont the following year. In 1954, after a bout serving in the United States Marine Corps, he signed on with the regional label Starday where he co-wrote and recorded his first hit "Why, Baby, Why", which peaked at No. 4 on the Billboard country charts. Following this success, Jones moved to Nashville and signed on with Mercury Records, releasing his first No. 1 hit, "White Lightning", written by J.P. "the Big Bopper" Richardson, in 1959. It was during this time that he was nicknamed "The Possum" due to his distinctive facial structure.

In 1962, Jones switched record labels from Mercury Records to United Artists to follow his record producer and mentor Harold "Pappy" Daily. He faced continued success at United Artists with his third No. 1 hit "She Thinks I Still Care" and several other records such as "The Race is On", "A Girl I Used to Know", and a duet with Melba Montgomery, "We Must Have Been Out of Our Minds". Switching labels again to Musicor in 1964, Jones' fame waned mainly due to his increased drinking and use of amphetamines, garnering him only one more No. 1 hit in the 1960s, "Walk Through This World With Me" in 1967.

In 1969, Jones married Tammy Wynette, another prolific country music star throughout the 1960s and 70s, thus they were dubbed "Mr. and Mrs. Country Music". The duo recorded and released three number one country hits together through Epic Records between 1973 and 1976 – "We're Gonna Hold On", "Golden Ring", and "Near You". The pair also produced several other chart toppers like "The Ceremony" in 1972 and "We Loved it Anyway" in 1974. Jones was met with solo triumphs as well in "The Door" and "The Grand Tour" both getting to No. 1 in 1974. Wynette and Jones divorced in 1975, but they continued to record music together well into the mid-1990s. The divorce further descended Jones into alcoholism and drug addiction, leading him to often miss shows or show up drunk, meriting him the nickname "No Show Jones".

In 1980, Jones' record "He Stopped Loving Her Today" was released for Columbia Studio B, his first No. 1 hit in six years, winning him 3 CMA awards, a Grammy, and 2 ACM awards. The song is often cited as one of the best country songs of all time and is credited with putting Jones back into the public eye after his personal issues in the late 1970s. Throughout the 1980s and 90s, Jones continued publishing music, recording hits like "If Drinkin' Don't Kill Me (Her Memory Will)" in 1981, "Yesterday's Wine" with Merle Haggard in 1982, "Who's Gonna Fill Their Shoes?" and "The One I Loved Back Then (The Corvette Song)" in 1985, as well as "I Don't Need Your Rockin' Chair" in 1992. During this time, Jones often recorded with other newer artists such as Alan Jackson, Patty Loveless, and Randy Travis. Jones died in 2013 of hypoxic respiratory failure, aged 81.

George Jones is often considered one of the greatest country music singers of all time. He has won the Country Music Association's Male Vocalist of the Year two times, in 1980 and 1981, and has been nominated for 12 Grammy Awards, winning in both 1981 and 2000. Jones was inducted into the Country Music Hall of Fame in 1992 and received the Kennedy Center Honors in 2008.

== Life and career ==
=== Early years (1931–1953) ===
George Glenn Jones was born on September 12, 1931, in Saratoga, Texas, and was raised with a brother and five sisters in Colmesneil, in the Big Thicket region of southeast Texas. His father, George Washington Jones, worked in a shipyard and played harmonica and guitar; his mother, Clara (née Patterson), played piano in the Pentecostal church on Sundays. When Jones was born, his arm was broken when one of the doctors dropped him. He heard country music for the first time when he was seven, when his parents bought a radio. Jones recalled to Billboard in 2006 that he would lie in bed with his parents on Saturday nights listening to the Grand Ole Opry, and would insist that his mother wake him if he fell asleep so that he could hear Roy Acuff or Bill Monroe.

In his autobiography I Lived To Tell It All, Jones recalled that the early death of his sister Ethel worsened his father's drinking problem, which caused him to be physically and emotionally abusive to his wife and children. In his biography George Jones: The Life and Times of a Honky Tonk Legend, Bob Allen recounts how George Washington Jones would return home drunk in the middle of the night with his cronies, wake up his terrified son and demand that he sing for them or face a beating. In a CMT episode of Inside Fame dedicated to Jones's life, country music historian Robert K. Oermann said, "You would think that it would make him not a singer, because it was so abusively thrust on him. But the opposite happened; he became ... someone who had to sing." In the same program, Jones admitted that he remained ambivalent and resentful towards his father until the day he died. He observed in his autobiography, "The Jones family makeup doesn't sit well with liquor ... Daddy was an unusual drinker. He drank to excess, but never while working, and he probably was the hardest working man I've ever known." He was nine when his father bought him his first guitar; he learned his first chords and songs at church. Several photographs show a young George busking on the streets of Beaumont.

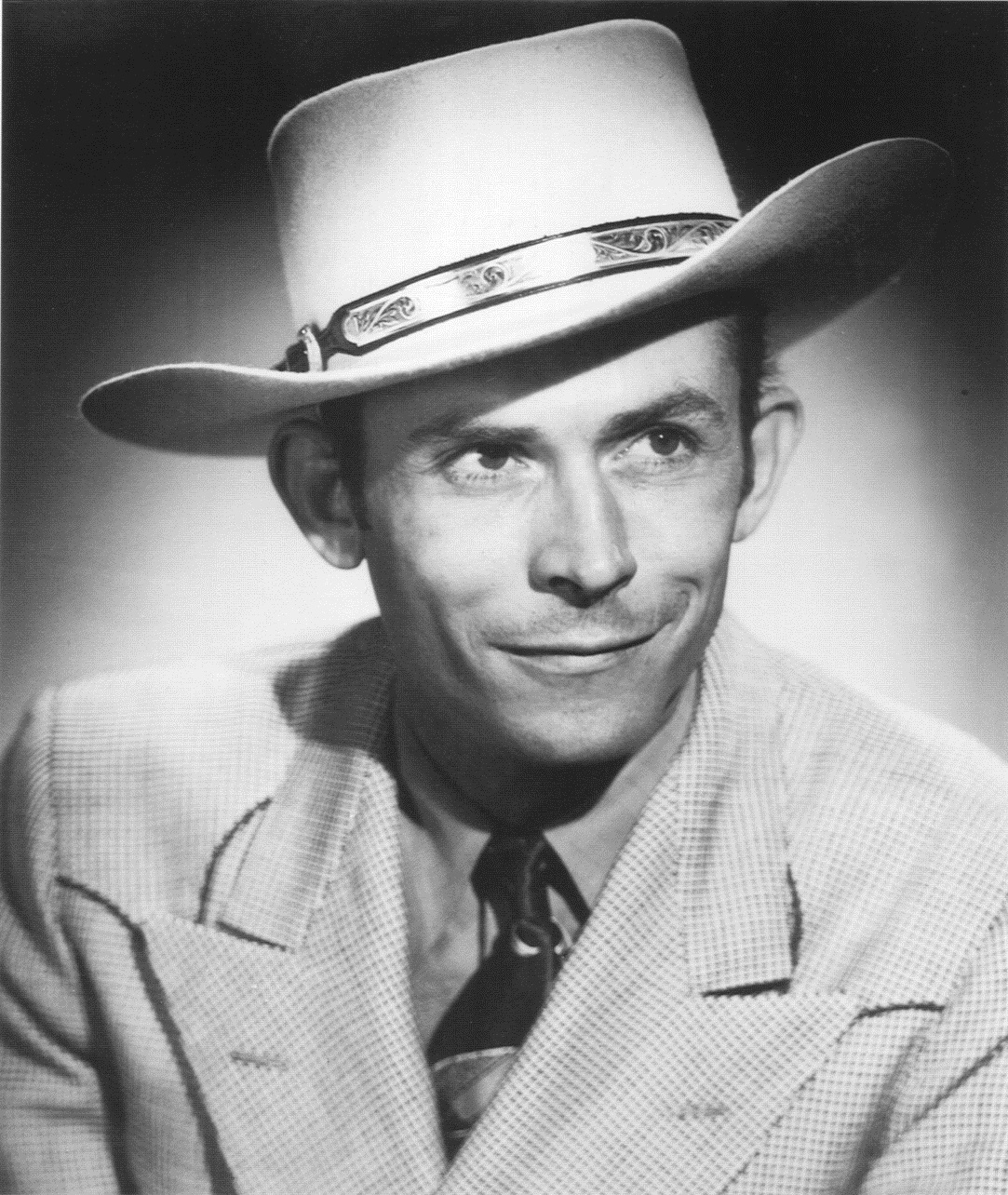
Hank Williams, Jones's biggest musical influence

He left home at 16 and went to Jasper, Texas, where he sang and played on the KTXJ radio station with fellow musician Dalton Henderson. He moved to the KRIC radio station, and during an afternoon show there met his idol, Hank Williams ("I just stared," he later wrote). In the 1989 video documentary Same Ole Me, Jones admitted, "I couldn't think or eat nothin' unless it was Hank Williams, and I couldn't wait for his next record to come out. He had to be, really, the greatest." He married his first wife, Dorothy Bonvillion in 1950; they divorced in 1951. He was enlisted in the United States Marines, and until his discharge in 1953, he was stationed in San Jose, California.

=== First recordings (1954–1957) ===
Jones married Shirley Ann Corley in 1954. His first record, the self-penned "No Money in This Deal", was recorded on January 19, 1954, and released in February on Starday Records. This began Jones's association with producer and mentor H.W. "Pappy" Daily. The song was cut in the living room of Starday Records' co-founder Jack Starnes, who produced it. Around this time Jones also worked at KTRM (now KZZB) in Beaumont. Deejay Gordon Baxter told Nick Tosches that Jones had acquired the nickname "possum" while working there. During his early recording sessions, Daily admonished Jones for attempting to sound too much like his heroes Hank Williams and Lefty Frizzell. In 1996 Jones recalled to NPR that the quality of production at Starday was poor. "It was a terrible sound. We recorded in a small living room of a house on a highway near Beaumont. You could hear the trucks. We had to stop a lot of times because it wasn't soundproof, it was just egg crates nailed on the wall and the big old semi trucks would go by and make a lot of noise and we'd have to start over again." Jones's first hit came with "Why Baby Why" in 1955, and in that year, while touring as a cast member of the Louisiana Hayride, Jones met and played shows with Elvis Presley and Johnny Cash. In 1994, Jones told Nick Tosches that Presley "stayed pretty much with his friends around him in his dressing room". Jones remained a lifelong friend of Johnny Cash, and was invited to sing at the Grand Ole Opry in 1956.

With Presley's explosion in popularity in 1956, pressure was put on Jones to cut some rockabilly sides. He reluctantly agreed, but his heart was not in it and he quickly regretted his decision. He joked later in his autobiography, "When I've encountered those records I've used them for Frisbees." He told Billboard in 2006: "I was desperate. When you're hungry, a poor man with a house full of kids, you're gonna do some things you ordinarily wouldn't do. I said, 'Well, hell, I'll try anything once.' I tried 'Dadgum It How Come It' and 'Rock It', a bunch of shit. I didn't want my name on the rock and roll thing, so I told them to put Thumper Jones on it and if it did something, good, if it didn't, hell, I didn't want to be shamed with it." He unsuccessfully attempted to buy all the masters to keep the cuts from surfacing later, which they did.

Jones moved to Mercury in 1957, teamed up with singer Jeannette Hicks, the first of several duet partners he would have over the years, and had another top-10 single with "Yearning". Starday Records merged with Mercury that year, and Jones was rated highly on the charts with his debut Mercury release, "Don't Stop the Music". Although he was garnering a lot of attention, and his singles were making very respectable showings on the charts, he was still travelling the black-top roads in a 1940s Packard with his name and phone number on the side, playing the "blood bucket" circuit of honky-tonks that dotted the rural countryside.

=== Commercial breakout (1959–1964) ===
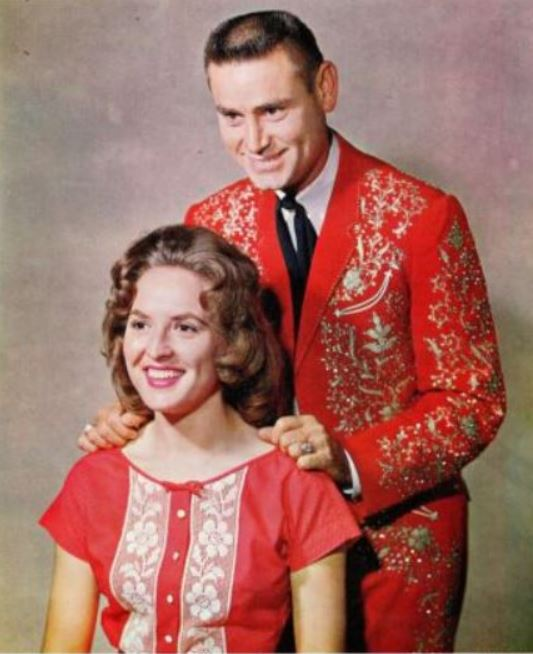
One of George Jones's duet partners was Melba Montgomery. In the 1960s, they recorded a series of duets such as "We Must Have Been Out of Our Minds".

In 1959, Jones had his first number one on the Billboard country chart with "White Lightnin'", which was a more authentic rock and roll sound than his half-hearted rockabilly cuts.

Jones had early success as a songwriter. He wrote or co-wrote many of his biggest hits during this period, several of which became standards, such as "Window Up Above" (later a hit for Mickey Gilley in 1975) and "Seasons of My Heart" (a hit for Johnny Cash, and also recorded by Willie Nelson and Jerry Lee Lewis). Jones wrote "Just One More" (also recorded by Cash), "Life To Go" (a top-five hit for Stonewall Jackson in 1959), "You Gotta Be My Baby", and "Don't Stop The Music" on his own, and had a hand in writing "Color of the Blues" (covered by Loretta Lynn and Elvis Costello), "Tender Years", and "Tall, Tall Trees" (co-written with Roger Miller). Jones's most frequent songwriting collaborator was his childhood friend Darrell Edwards.

Jones signed with United Artists in 1962, and immediately scored one of the biggest hits of his career, "She Thinks I Still Care". His voice had grown deeper during this period, and he began cultivating his own singing style. During his stint with UA, Jones recorded albums of Hank Williams and Bob Wills songs, and cut an album of duets with Melba Montgomery, including the hit "We Must Have Been Out of Our Minds". Jones was also gaining a reputation as a hell-raiser. In his Rolling Stone tribute, Merle Haggard recalled:

"I met him at the Blackboard Café in Bakersfield, California, which was the place to go in '61. He was already famous for not showing up or showing up drunk, and he showed up drunk. I was onstage – I think I was singing Marty Robbins' 'Devil Woman' – and he kicked the doors of the office open and said 'Who the fuck is that?' It was one of the greatest compliments of my entire life when George Jones said I was his favorite country singer ... In 1967, I released a ballad called "I Threw Away the Rose" and he was so impressed he actually jumped ship and left his tour, rented a Lear Jet and came to Amarillo, Texas. He told me my low note changed his life."

Jones was always backed by the Jones Boys on tour. Like Buck Owens's Buckaroos and Merle Haggard's Strangers, Jones worked with many talented musicians, including Dan Schafer, Hank Singer, Brittany Allyn, Sonny Curtis, Kent Goodson, Bobby Birkhead, and Steve Hinson. In the 1980s and 1990s, bass player Ron Gaddis served as the Jones Boys' bandleader and sang harmony with Jones in concert. Lorrie Morgan (who married Gaddis) also toured as a backup singer for Jones in the late 1970s and early 1980s. Johnny Paycheck was the Jones Boys' bass player in the 1960s before going on to his own stardom in the 1970s.

=== Alcoholism and decline (1964–1979) ===
In 1964, Pappy Daily secured a new contract with Musicor Records. For the rest of the 1960s, Jones scored only one number one (1967's "Walk Through This World With Me"), but he featured often in the country music charts. Significant hits included "Love Bug" (a nod to Buck Owens and the Bakersfield sound), "Things Have Gone to Pieces", "The Race Is On", "My Favorite Lies", "I'll Share My World with You", "Take Me" (which he co-wrote and later recorded with Tammy Wynette), "A Good Year for the Roses", and "If My Heart Had Windows". Jones's singing style had by now evolved from the full-throated, high lonesome sound of Hank Williams and Roy Acuff on his early Starday records to the more refined, subtle style of Lefty Frizzell. In a 2006 interview with Billboard, Jones acknowledged the fellow Texan's influence on his idiosyncratic phrasing: "I got that from Lefty. He always made five syllables out of one word."

Jones's binge drinking and use of amphetamines on the road caught up to him in 1967, and he had to be admitted into a neurological hospital to seek treatment for his drinking. Jones would go to extreme lengths for a drink if the thirst was on him. A drinking story concerning Jones occurred while he was married to his second wife Shirley Corley. Jones recalled Shirley trying to prevent him from travelling to Beaumont, 8 miles (13 km) away, to buy liquor. She said she hid the keys to all their cars, but she did not hide the keys to the lawn mower. He wrote in his memoir: "There, gleaming in the glow, was that ten-horsepower rotary engine under a seat. A key glistening in the ignition. I imagine the top speed for that old mower was five miles per hour. It might have taken an hour and a half or more for me to get to the liquor store, but get there I did." Years later Jones comically mocked the incident by making a cameo in the video for "All My Rowdy Friends Are Coming Over Tonight" by Hank Williams Jr. He also parodied the episode in the 1993 video for "One More Last Chance" by Vince Gill and in his own music video for the single "Honky Tonk Song" in 1996. Tammy Wynette, in her 1979 autobiography Stand By Your Man, claimed the incident occurred while she was married to Jones. She said she woke at one in the morning to find her husband gone. "I got into the car and drove to the nearest bar 10 miles [16 km] away. When I pulled into the parking lot, there sat our rider-mower right by the entrance. He'd driven that mower right down a main highway... He looked up and saw me and said, ‘Well, fellas, here she is now. My little wife, I told you she'd come after me.’" Jones had become aware of Tammy Wynette because their tours were booked by the same agency and their paths sometimes crossed. Wynette was married to songwriter Don Chapel, who was also the opening act for her shows, and the three became friends. Jones married Wynette in 1969.

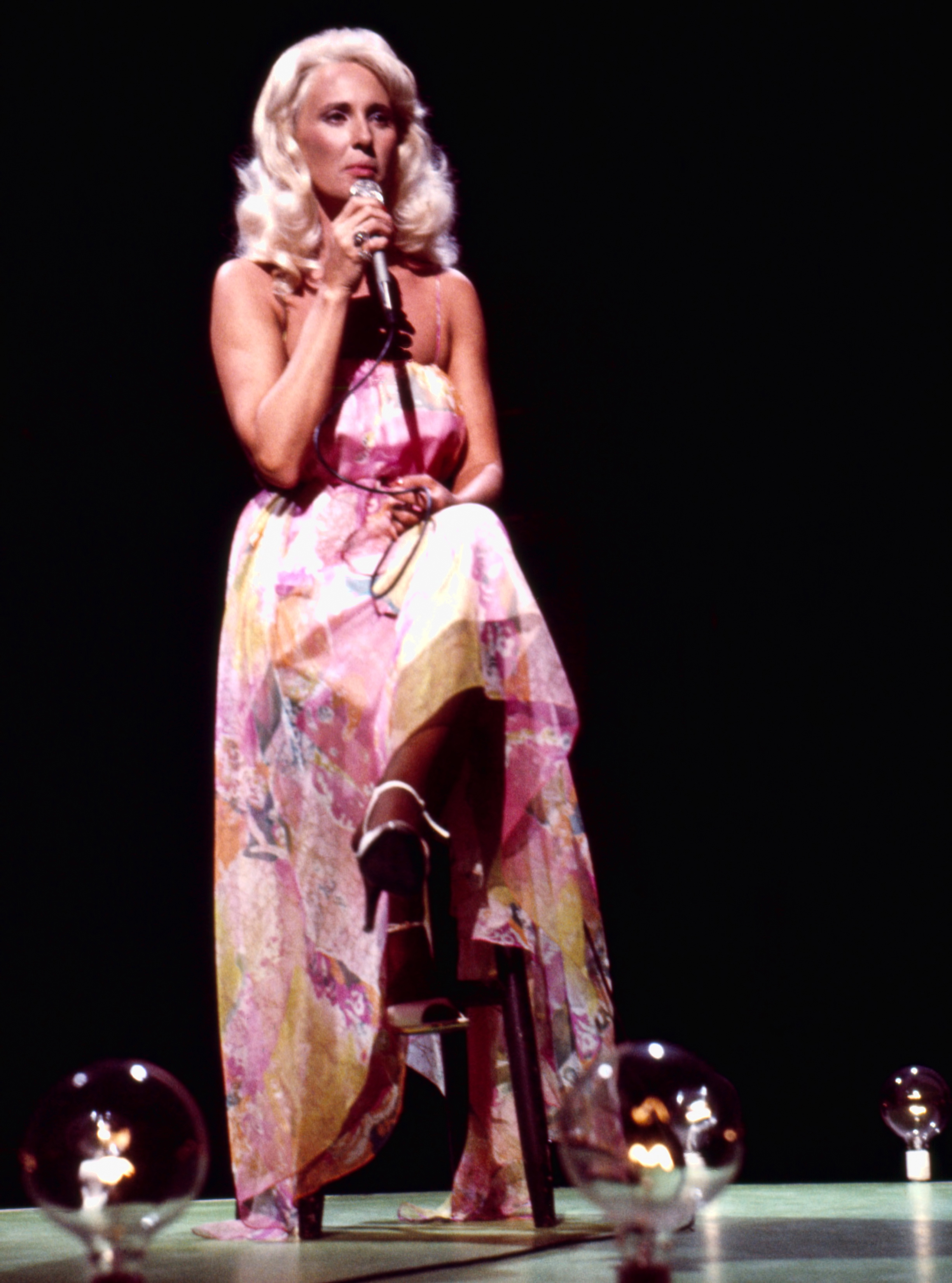
Tammy Wynette in 1971

They began touring together, and Jones bought out his contract with Musicor so that he could record with Wynette and her producer Billy Sherrill on Epic Records after she had split with longtime producer Pappy Daily. In the early 1970s, Jones and Wynette became known as "Mr. & Mrs. Country Music" and scored several big hits, including "We're Gonna Hold On", "Let's Build A World Together", "Golden Ring" and "Near You". When asked about recording Jones and Wynette, Sherill told Dan Daley in 2002, "We started out trying to record the vocals together, but George drove Tammy crazy with his phrasing. He never, ever did it the same way twice. He could make a five-syllable word out of 'church.' Finally, Tammy said, 'Record George and let me listen to it, and then do my vocal after we get his on tape.' "

In October 1970, shortly after the birth of their only child Tamala Georgette, Jones was straitjacketed and committed to a padded cell at the Watson Clinic in Lakeland, Florida, after a drunken bender. He was kept there for 10 days to detoxify, before being released with a prescription for Librium. Jones managed to stay sober with Wynette for long periods, but as the decade wore on, his drinking and erratic behavior worsened and they divorced in 1976. Jones accepted responsibility for the failure of the marriage, but denied Wynette's allegations in her autobiography that he had beaten her and fired a shotgun at her. Jones and Wynette continued playing shows and drawing crowds after their divorce, as fans began to see their songs mirroring their stormy relationship. In 1980, they recorded the album Together Again and scored a hit with "Two Story House". In the 2019 Ken Burns documentary Country Music, Jones and Wynette were compared to "two wounded animals". Jones also spoke of his hopes for a reconciliation, and would jokingly reference Wynette in some of his songs – during performances of his 1981 hit "If Drinkin' Don't Kill Me (Her Memory Will)" he would sing "Tammy's memory will" – but the recriminations continued. Jones and Wynette appeared to make peace in the 1990s, and recorded a final album, One, and toured together again before Wynette's death in 1998. In 1995, Jones told Country Weekly, "Like the old saying goes, it takes time to heal things and they've been healed quite a while."

Jones's pairing with Billy Sherrill at Epic Records came as a surprise to many; Sherrill and business partner Glenn Sutton are regarded as the defining influences of the countrypolitan sound, a smooth amalgamation of pop and country music that was popular during the late 1960s and throughout the 1970s, a far cry from George's honky-tonk roots. Despite a shaky start, the success that Sherrill had with Jones proved to be his most enduring; although Billboard chart statistics show that Sherrill had his biggest commercial successes with artists such as Wynette and Charlie Rich, with Jones, Sherrill had his longest-lasting association. In Sherrill, Jones found what Andrew Meuller of Uncut described as "the producer capable of creating the epically lachrymose arrangements his voice deserved and his torment demanded...He summoned for Jones the symphonies of sighing strings that almost made the misery of albums like 1974's The Grand Tour and 1976's Alone Again sound better than happiness could possibly feel." In 1974, they scored a number-one hit with the instant classic "The Grand Tour" and followed that with "The Door" ("I've heard the sound of my dear old mother cryin'/and the sound of the train that took me off to war"), another number-one smash. Unlike most singers, who might have been overwhelmed by the string arrangements and background vocalists Sherrill sometimes employed on his records, Jones's voice, with its at times frightening intensity and lucid tone, could stand up to anything. While Jones wrote fewer songs himself – songwriters had been tripping over themselves pitching songs to him for years – he still managed to co-write several, such as "What My Woman Can't Do" (also recorded by Jerry Lee Lewis), "A Drunk Can't Be A Man", the harrowing "I Just Don't Give a Damn" (perhaps the greatest "lost classic" in the entire Jones catalogue), and "These Days (I Barely Get By)", which he had written with Wynette.

In the late 1970s, Jones spiraled out of control. Already drinking constantly, a manager named Shug Baggot introduced him to cocaine before a show because he was too tired to perform. The drug increased Jones' already considerable paranoia. During one drunken binge, he shot at, and very nearly hit, his friend and occasional songwriting partner Earl "Peanutt" Montgomery, who had quit drinking after finding religion. He was often penniless and acknowledged in his autobiography that Waylon Jennings and Johnny Cash came to his financial aid during this time. Jones also began missing shows at an alarming rate and lawsuits from promoters started piling up. In 1978, owing Wynette $36,000 in child support and claiming to be $1 million in debt, he filed for bankruptcy. Jones appeared incoherent at times, speaking in quarrelling voices that he would later call "the Duck" and "the Old Man". In his article "The Devil In George Jones", Nick Tosches states:

"By February 1979, he was homeless, deranged, and destitute, living in his car and barely able to digest the junk food on which he subsisted. He weighed under a hundred pounds, and his condition was so bad that it took him more than two years to complete My Very Special Guests, an album on which Willie Nelson, Linda Ronstadt, Elvis Costello, and other famous fans came to his vocal aid and support. Jones entered Hillcrest Psychiatric Hospital in Birmingham, Alabama. Upon his release in January 1980, the first thing he did was pick up a six-pack."

Jones often displayed a sheepish, self-deprecating sense of humor regarding his dire financial standing and bad reputation. In June 1979, he appeared with Waylon Jennings on Ralph Emery's syndicated radio program, and at one point Jennings cracked, "It's lonely at the top." A laughing Jones replied, "It's lonely at the bottom, too! It's real, real lonely, Waylon." Despite his chronic unreliability, Jones was still capable of putting on a captivating live show. On Independence Day, 1976, he appeared at Willie Nelson's Fourth of July Picnic in Gonzales, Texas, in front of 80,000 younger, country-rock oriented fans. A nervous Jones felt out of his comfort zone and nearly bolted from the festival, but went on anyway and wound up stealing the show. The Houston Post wrote, "He was the undisputed star of this year's Willie Nelson picnic...one of the greatest." Penthouse called him "the spirit of country music, plain and simple, its Holy Ghost". The Village Voice added, "As a singer he is as intelligent as they come, and should be considered for a spot in America's all-time top ten." Jones began missing more shows than he made, however, including several highly publicized dates at the Bottom Line club in New York City. Former vice president of CBS Records Rick Blackburn recalls in the 1989 video Same Ole Me that the event had been hyped for weeks, with a lot of top press and cast members from Saturday Night Live planning to attend. "We'd made our plans, travel arrangements, and so forth. George excused himself from my office, left – and we didn't see him for three weeks. He just did not show up." Much like Hank Williams, Jones seemed suspicious of success and furiously despised perceived slights and condescension directed towards the music that he loved so dearly. When he finally played the Bottom Line in 1980, The New York Times called him "the finest, most riveting singer in country music".

=== Comeback (1980–1990) ===
By 1980, George Jones had not achieved a No. 1 single in six years, leading many critics to doubt his career. However, he surprised the music industry when "He Stopped Loving Her Today" reached No. 1 on the country charts, staying there for 18 weeks. The song, written by Bobby Braddock and Curly Putman, tells the story of a man who continues to love his departed lover until his death. It is consistently voted as one of the greatest country songs of all time, along with "I'm So Lonesome I Could Cry" by Hank Williams and "Crazy" by Patsy Cline. Jones, who personally hated the song and considered it morbid, ultimately gave the song credit for reviving his flagging career, stating, "a four-decade career had been salvaged by a three-minute song". Jones earned the Grammy Award for Best Male Country Vocal Performance in 1980. The Academy of Country Music awarded the song Single of the Year and Song of the Year in 1980. It also became the Country Music Association's Song of the Year in both 1980 and 1981.

The success of "He Stopped Loving Her Today" led CBS Records to renew Jones's recording contract and sparked new interest in the singer. He was the subject of an hour-and-a-quarter-long HBO television special titled George Jones: With a Little Help from His Friends, which had him performing songs with Waylon Jennings, Elvis Costello, Tanya Tucker, and Tammy Wynette, among others. Jones continued drinking and using cocaine, appearing at various awards shows to accept honors for "He Stopped Loving Her Today" obviously inebriated, like when he performed "I Was Country When Country Wasn't Cool" with Barbara Mandrell at the 1981 Country Music Association Awards. He was involved in several high-speed car chases with police, which were reported on the national news, and one arrest was filmed by a local TV crew; the video, which is widely available online, offers a glimpse into Jones's alter ego when drinking, as he argues with the police officer and lunges at the camera man. Conversely, when sober, Jones was known to be friendly and down to earth, even shy. In a 1994 article on Jones, Nick Tosches remarked that when he first interviewed the singer in April 1976, "One could readily believe the accounts by those who had known him for years: that he had not changed much at all and that he had been impervious to fame and fortune." In an unusually unguarded self-appraisal in 1981, the singer told Mark Rose of The Village Voice, "I don't show a lot of affection. I have probably been a very unliked person among family, like somebody who was heartless. I saved it all for the songs. I didn't know you were supposed to show that love person to person. I guess I always wanted to, but I didn't know how. The only way I could would be to do it in a song." Years later he commented to the Christian Broadcasting Network's Scott Ross about himself, "I think you're mad at yourself, I think that you're sayin' to yourself 'You don't deserve this. You don't deserve those fans. You don't deserve makin' this money.' And you're mad at yourself. And you beat up on yourself by drinkin' and losing friends that won't put up with that...It's just one terrible big mess you make out of your life." In 1982, Jones recorded the album A Taste of Yesterday's Wine with Merle Haggard. Jones, in the wake of his condition, appeared underweight on the album cover, while Rolling Stone claimed that his "dispirited singing doesn’t inspire sympathy; his high, pure whine has started to sound, well, whiny." His run of hits also continued in the early 1980s, with the singer charting "I'm Not Ready Yet", "Same Ole Me" (backed by the Oak Ridge Boys)", "Still Doin' Time", "Tennessee Whiskey", "We Didn't See a Thing" (a duet with Ray Charles), and "I Always Get Lucky with You", which was Jones's last No. 1 in 1984.

In 1981, Jones met Nancy Sepulvado, a 34-year-old divorcée from Mansfield, Louisiana. Sepulvado's positive impact on Jones's life and career cannot be overstated. She eventually cleaned up his finances, kept him away from his drug dealers (who reportedly kidnapped her daughter in retaliation), and managed his career. Jones always gave her complete credit for saving his life. Nancy, who did not drink, explained to Nick Tosches in 1994: "He was drinking but he was fun to be around. It wasn't love at first sight or anything like that. But I saw what a good person he was, deep down, and I couldn't help caring about him." Jones managed to quit cocaine, but went on a drunken rampage in Alabama in fall 1983, and was once again straitjacketed and committed to Hillcrest Psychiatric Hospital suffering from malnutrition and delusions. By that time, though, physically and emotionally exhausted, he really did want to quit drinking. In March 1984 in Birmingham, Alabama – at the age of 52 – Jones performed his first sober show since the early 1970s. "All my life it seems like I've been running from something," he told the United Press International in June. "If I knew what it was, maybe I could run in the right direction, but I always seem to end up going the other way." Jones began making up many of the dates he had missed, playing them for free to pay back promoters, and began opening his concerts with "No Show Jones", a song he had written with Glen Martin that poked fun at himself and other country singers. Jones always stressed that he was not proud of the way he treated loved ones and friends over the years, and was ashamed of disappointing his fans when he missed shows. He told Billboard in 2006: "I know it hurt my fans in a way and I've always been sad about that, it really bothered me for a long time."

Mostly sober for the rest of the 1980s, Jones consistently released albums with Sherrill producing, including Shine On, Jones Country, You've Still Got A Place In My Heart, Who's Gonna Fill Their Shoes, Wine Colored Roses (an album Jones would tell Jolene Downs in 2001 was one of his personal favorites), Too Wild Too Long, and One Woman Man. Jones's video for his 1985 hit "Who's Gonna Fill Their Shoes" won the CMA award for Video of the Year (Billy Sherrill makes a cameo as the bus driver).

=== Later years and death (1990–2013) ===
In 1990, Jones released his last proper studio album on Epic, You Oughta Be Here With Me. Although the album featured several stirring performances, including the lead single "Hell Stays Open All Night Long" and the Roger Miller-penned title song, the single did poorly and Jones made the switch to MCA, ending his relationship with Sherrill and what was now Sony Music after 19 years. His first album with MCA, And Along Came Jones, was released in 1991, and backed by MCA's powerful promotion team and producer Kyle Lehning (who had produced a string of hit albums for Randy Travis), the album sold better than his previous one had. However, two singles, "You Couldn't Get The Picture" and "She Loved A Lot In Her Time" (a tribute to Jones's mother Clara), did not crack the Top 30 on the charts, as Jones lost favor with country radio, as the format was altered radically during the early 1990s. His last album to have significant radio airplay was 1992's Walls Can Fall, which featured the novelty song "Finally Friday" and "I Don't Need Your Rockin' Chair", a testament to his continued vivaciousness in his 60s. Despite the lack of radio airplay, Jones continued to record and tour throughout the 1990s and was inducted into the Country Music Hall of Fame by Randy Travis in 1992. In 1996, Jones released his autobiography I Lived To Tell It All with Tom Carter, and the irony of his long career was not lost on him, with the singer writing in its preface, "I also know that a lot of my show-business peers are going to be angry after reading this book. So many have worked so hard to maintain their careers. I never took my career seriously, and yet it's flourishing." He also pulled no punches about his disappointment in the direction country music had taken, devoting a full chapter to the changes in the country music scene of the 1990s that had him removed from radio playlists in favor of a younger generation of pop-influenced country stars. (Jones had long been a critic of country pop; along with Wynette and Jean Shepard, he was one of the major backers of the Association of Country Entertainers, a guild promoting traditional country sounds that was founded in 1974; Jones's divorce from Wynette was a factor in the association's collapse.) Despite his absence from the country charts during this time, latter-day country superstars such as Garth Brooks, Randy Travis, Alan Jackson, and many others often paid tribute to Jones, while expressing their love and respect for his legacy as a true country legend who paved the way for their own success. On February 17, 1998, The Nashville Network premiered a group of television specials called The George Jones Show, with Jones as host. The program featured informal chats with Jones holding court with country's biggest stars old and new, and of course, music. Guests included Loretta Lynn, Trace Adkins, Johnny Paycheck, Lorrie Morgan, Merle Haggard, Billy Ray Cyrus, Tim McGraw, Faith Hill, Charley Pride, Bobby Bare, Patty Loveless, and Waylon Jennings, among others.

While Jones remained committed to "pure country", he worked with the top producers and musicians of the day and the quality of his work remained high. Some of his significant performances include "I Must Have Done Something Bad", "Wild Irish Rose", "Billy B. Bad" (a sarcastic jab at country music establishment trendsetters), "A Thousand Times A Day", "When The Last Curtain Falls", and the novelty "High-Tech Redneck". Jones's most popular song in his later years was "Choices", the first single from his 1999 studio album Cold Hard Truth. A video was also made for the song, and Jones won another Grammy for Best Male Country Vocal Performance. The song was at the center of controversy when the Country Music Association invited Jones to perform it on the awards show, but required that he perform an abridged version. Jones refused and did not attend the show. Alan Jackson was disappointed with the association's decision, and halfway through his own performance during the show, he signaled to his band and played part of Jones's song in protest.

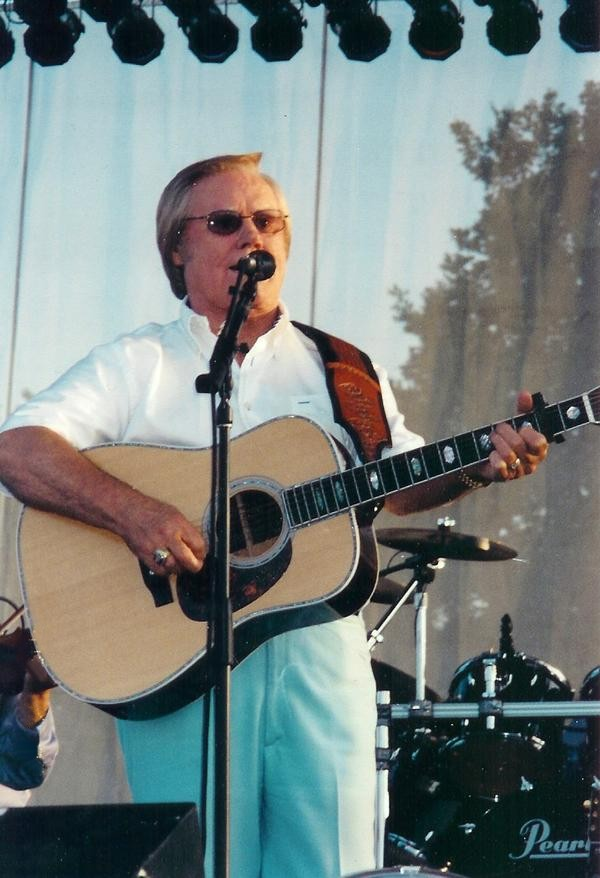
Jones performing in Metropolis, Illinois, in 2002

On March 6, 1999, Jones was involved in an accident when he crashed his sport utility vehicle near his home. He was taken to the Vanderbilt University Medical Center (VUMC), where he was released two weeks later. In May of that year, Jones pleaded guilty to drunk-driving charges related to the accident. (In his memoir published three years earlier, Jones admitted that he sometimes had a glass of wine before dinner and that he still drank beer occasionally, but insisted, "I don't squirm in my seat, fighting the urge for another drink" and speculated, "perhaps I'm not a true alcoholic in the modern sense of the word. Perhaps I was always just an old fashioned drunk.")

The crash was a significant turning point, as he explained to Billboard in 2006: "When I had that wreck, I made up my mind, it put the fear of God in me. No more smoking, no more drinking. I didn't have to have no help, I made up my mind to quit. I don't crave it." After the accident, Jones went on to release The Gospel Collection in 2003, for which Billy Sherrill came out of retirement to produce. He appeared at a televised Johnny Cash Memorial Concert in Jonesboro, Arkansas, in 2003, singing "Big River" with Willie Nelson and Kris Kristofferson. In 2008, Jones received the Kennedy Center Honor along with Pete Townshend and Roger Daltrey of the Who, Barbra Streisand, Morgan Freeman, and Twyla Tharp. President George W. Bush disclosed that he had many of Jones's songs on his iPod. Jones also served as judge in 2008 for the 8th annual Independent Music Awards to support independent artists' careers. An album titled Hits I Missed and One I Didn't, in which he covered hits he had passed on, as well as a remake of his own "He Stopped Loving Her Today", would be released as his final studio album. In 2012, Jones received the Grammy Lifetime Achievement award.

On March 29, 2012, Jones was taken to the hospital with an upper respiratory infection. On May 21, Jones was hospitalized again for his infection and was released five days later. On August 14, 2012, Jones announced his farewell tour, the Grand Tour, with scheduled stops at 60 cities. His final concert was held in Knoxville at the Knoxville Civic Coliseum on April 6, 2013.

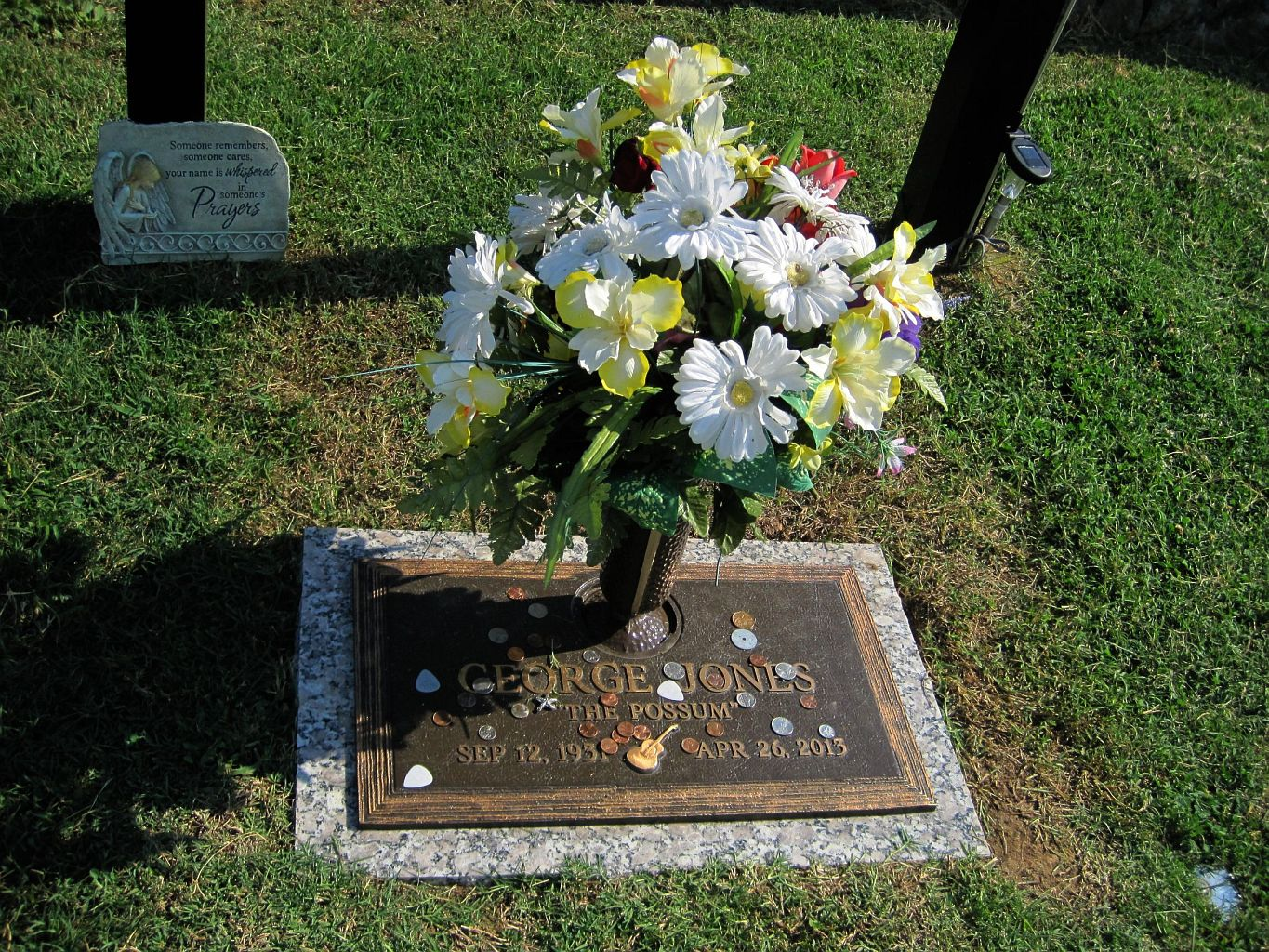
Jones's grave in Nashville

Jones was scheduled to perform his final concert at the Bridgestone Arena on November 22, 2013. However, on April 18, 2013, Jones was taken to VUMC for a slight fever and irregular blood pressure. His concerts in Alabama and Salem were postponed as a result. Following six days in intensive care at VUMC, Jones died on April 26, 2013, at age 81. Former First Lady Laura Bush was among those eulogizing Jones at his funeral on May 2, 2013. Other speakers were Tennessee Governor Bill Haslam, former Arkansas Governor Mike Huckabee, news personality Bob Schieffer, and country singers Barbara Mandrell and Kenny Chesney. Alan Jackson, Kid Rock, Ronnie Milsap, Randy Travis, Vince Gill, Patty Loveless, Travis Tritt, the Oak Ridge Boys, Charlie Daniels, Wynonna, and Brad Paisley provided musical tributes. The service was broadcast live on CMT, GAC, RFD-TV, The Nashville Network, and FamilyNet as well as Nashville stations. SiriusXM and WSM 650 AM, home of the Grand Ole Opry, broadcast the event on the radio. The family requested that contributions be made to the Grand Ole Opry Trust Fund or to the Country Music Hall of Fame and Museum.

Jones was buried in Woodlawn Cemetery in Nashville. His death made headlines all over the world; many country stations (as well as a few of other formats, such as oldies/classic hits) abandoned or modified their playlists and played his songs throughout the day.

== Artistry ==
Billboard wrote: "His baritone evoked yearning, hard living and heartache in tales that echoed country music's deepest traditions."

== Legacy ==
Jones tirelessly defended the integrity of country music, telling Billboard in 2006, "It's never been for love of money. I thank God for it because it makes me a living. But I sing because I love it, not because of the dollar signs." Jones promoted younger country singers that he felt shared his passion about the music. In 1995, Alan Jackson said, "Everybody knows he's a great singer, but what I like most about George is that when you meet him, he is like some old guy that works down at the gas station...even though he's a legend!"

Shortly after Jones's death, Andrew Mueller wrote about his influence in Uncut, "He was one of the finest interpretive singers who ever lifted a microphone...There cannot be a single country songwriter of the last 50-odd years who has not wondered what it might be like to hear their words sung by that voice." In an article for The Texas Monthly in 1994, Nick Tosches eloquently described the singer's vocal style: "While he and his idol, Hank Williams, have both affected generations with a plaintive veracity of voice that has set them apart, Jones has an additional gift—a voice of exceptional range, natural elegance, and lucent tone. Gliding toward high tenor, plunging toward deep bass, the magisterial portamento of his onward-coursing baritone emits white-hot sparks and torrents of blue, investing his poison love songs with a tragic gravity and inflaming his celebrations of the honky-tonk ethos with the hellfire of abandon." In an essay printed in The New Republic, David Hajdu writes:

"Jones had a handsome and strange voice. His singing was always partly about the appeal of the tones he produced, regardless of the meaning of the words. In this sense, Jones had something in common with singers of formal music and opera, though his means of vocal production were radically different from theirs. He sang from the back of his throat, rather than from deep in his diaphragm. He tightened his larynx to squeeze sound out. He clenched his jaw, instead of wriggling it free. He forced wind through his teeth, and the notes sounded weirdly beautiful."

David Cantwell recalled in 2013, "His approach to singing, he told me once, was to call up those memories and feelings of his own that most closely corresponded to those being felt by the character in whatever song he was performing. He was a kind of singing method actor, creating an illusion of the real." In the liner notes to Essential George Jones: The Spirit of Country Rich Kienzle states, "Jones sings of people and stories that are achingly human. He can turn a ballad into a catharsis by wringing every possible emotion from it, making it a primal, strangled cry of anguish". Waylon Jennings expressed a similar opinion in his song "It's Alright": "If we all could sound like we wanted to, we'd all sound like George Jones." In the wake of Jones's death, Merle Haggard pronounced in Rolling Stone, "His voice was like a Stradivarius violin: one of the greatest instruments ever made." Emmylou Harris wrote, "When you hear George Jones sing, you are hearing a man who takes a song and makes it a work of art—always," a quote that appeared on the sleeve of Jones's 1976 album The Battle.

Several country music stars praised Jones in the documentary Same Ole Me. Randy Travis said, "It sounds like he's lived every minute of every word that he sings and there's very few people who can do that." Tom T. Hall said, "It was always Jones who got the message across just exactly right." Roy Acuff said, "I'd give anything if I could sing like George Jones." In the same film, producer Billy Sherrill states, "All I did was change the instrumentation around him. I don't think he's ever changed at all."

In 2023, Rolling Stone ranked Jones at No. 24 on their list of the 200 Greatest Singers of All Time.

Jones was the subject of the second season of the podcast Cocaine and Rhinestones, which contends Jones is the greatest country music singer ever.

== Duets ==
Jones released many duets over the course of his career. While his songs with Tammy Wynette are his best known, Jones claimed in his autobiography that he felt his duets with Melba Montgomery were his best. Jones also recorded duet albums with Gene Pitney and his former bass player Johnny Paycheck. Jones also recorded the duet albums My Very Special Guests (1979), A Taste of Yesterday's Wine with Merle Haggard (1982), Ladies Choice (1984), Friends In High Places (1991), The Bradley Barn Sessions (1994), God's Country: George Jones And Friends (2006), a second album with Merle Haggard called Kickin' Out The Footlights...Again (2006), and Burn Your Playhouse Down (2008).

== Discography ==
=== Number-one country hits ===
1. "White Lightning" (1959)
2. "Tender Years" (1961)
3. "She Thinks I Still Care" (1962)
4. "Walk Through This World with Me" (1967)
5. "We're Gonna Hold On" (with Tammy Wynette) (1973)
6. "The Grand Tour" (1974)
7. "The Door" (1975)
8. "Golden Ring" (with Tammy Wynette) (1976)
9. "Near You" (with Tammy Wynette) (1977)
10. "He Stopped Loving Her Today" (1980)
11. "Still Doin' Time" (1981)
12. "Yesterday's Wine" (with Merle Haggard) (1982)
13. "I Always Get Lucky with You" (1983)

== See also ==
- Academy of Country Music
- Country Music Association
- Inductees of the Country Music Hall of Fame (1992 inductee)
- List of best-selling music artists
- List of country musicians
