= Lorrie Morgan discography =

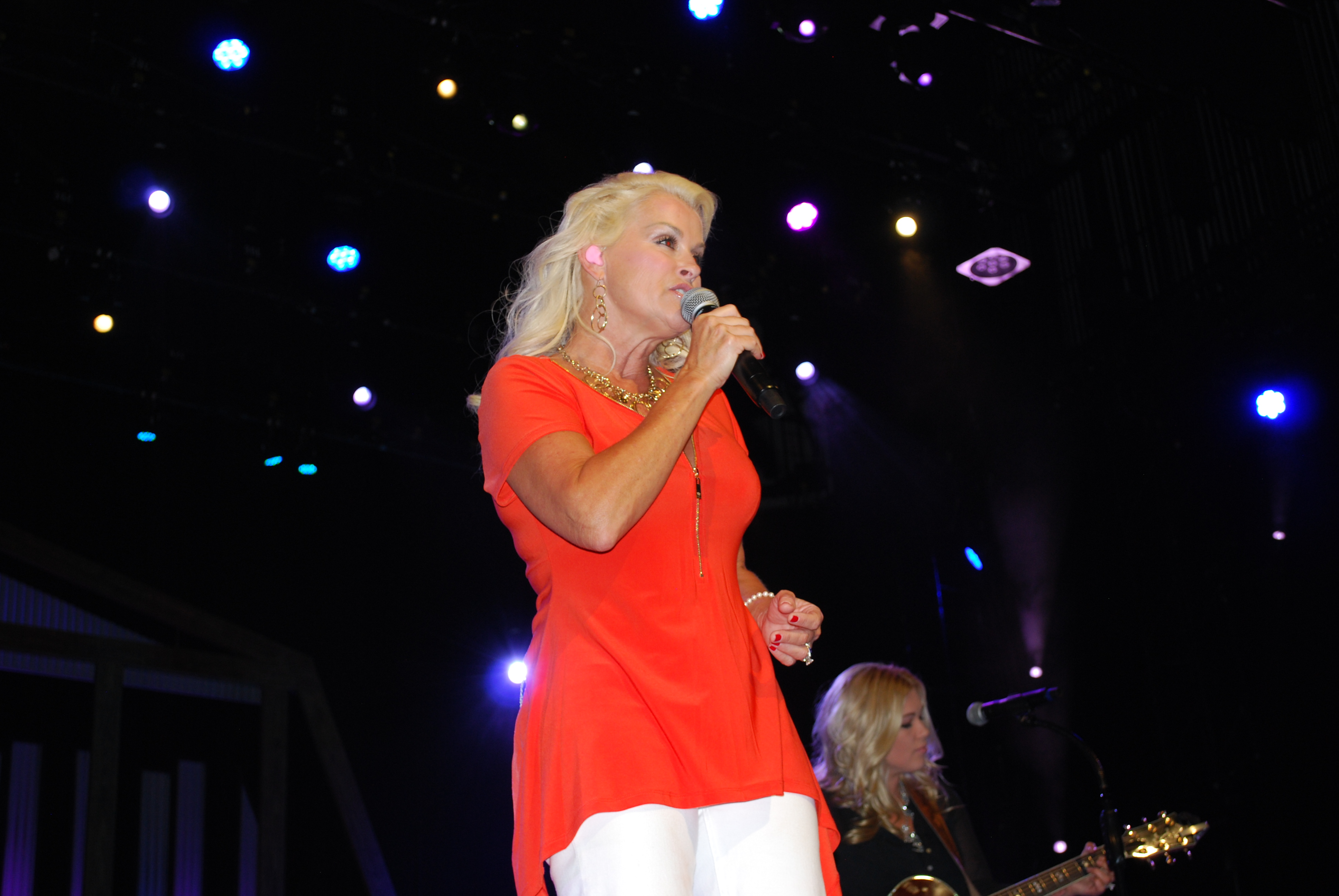
- Morgan performing at the Grand Ole Opry in 2015
- Studio albums: 19
- Extended plays: 1
- Live albums: 1
- Compilation albums: 9
- Singles: 51
- Video albums: 2
- Music videos: 21

The discography of American country music artist Lorrie Morgan contains 19 studio albums, nine compilation albums, two video albums, one live album, one extended play, 51 singles and 21 music videos. Morgan early releases were singles that reached lower-charting positions on the American Billboard Hot Country Songs chart. Morgan's 1988 single, "Trainwreck of Emotion", was her first to reach the Billboard country top 20. It was followed by her debut studio album in 1989 named Leave the Light On. It reached number six on the Billboard Top Country Albums chart and certified platinum in sales by the Recording Industry Association of America. The disc spawned three more top ten singles: "Dear Me", "Out of Your Shoes" and "He Talks to Me". Its fourth single, "Five Minutes", topped the Billboard country chart. Her second album was released in 1991 titled Something in Red. It reached number eight on the country albums chart and number 13 on the Canadian RPM Country Albums chart. In addition to certifying platinum by the RIAA, the disc included three top ten Billboard and RPM country songs: "We Both Walk", "A Picture of Me Without You" and "Except for Monday".

In 1992, BNA Records released her third studio album titled Watch Me. It became her third disc to certify platinum by the RIAA. Among its four singles was the number one Billboard and RPM country song, "What Part of No". Between 1993 and 1994, Morgan released the studio albums Merry Christmas from London and War Paint. In 1995, BNA issued the compilation, Reflections: Greatest Hits, which later certified two-times platinum in the United States. It featured several new recordings, including the number one single, "I Didn't Know My Own Strength". Greater Need (1996) reached Top Country Albums top ten and spawned the number four Billboard single, "Good as I Was to You". Shakin' Things Up (1997) reached a similar chart position and spawned the top five Billboard and RPM single, "Go Away". My Heart (1999) featured a top 20 duet with Sammy Kershaw called "Maybe Not Tonight". Morgan and Kershaw then collaborated on 2001 studio album, I Finally Found Someone.

Morgan's next releases were issued on several independent labels. Her 2004 album, Show Me How, reached number 30 on the Billboard Top Independent Albums chart and spawned her final charting single to date: "Do You Still Want to Buy Me That Drink (Frank)". Her second studio album of Christmas music was issued in 2007 titled An Old Fashioned Christmas. It was followed by A Moment in Time (2009), which peaked at number 40 on the Top Country Albums chart. Morgan collaborated with country artist Pam Tillis on studio albums: Dos Divas (2013) and Come See Me and Come Lonely (2017). In 2016, Morgan released the studio project, Letting Go...Slow, which charted at number 47 on the country albums list. Since her last album project, she has issued several digital singles including a remake of "A Picture of Me (Without You)".

== Albums ==
=== Studio albums ===
List of albums, with selected chart positions and certifications, showing other relevant details
Title	Album details	Peak chart positions					Certifications
Title	Album details	US	US Cou.	US Ind.	CAN	CAN Cou.	Certifications
Leave the Light On	Released: May 11, 1989; Label: RCA; Formats: LP, CD, cassette	117	6	—	—	29	RIAA: Platinum
Something in Red	Released: April 9, 1991; Label: RCA; Formats: LP, CD, cassette	53	8	—	—	13	MC: Gold; RIAA: Platinum
Watch Me	Released: October 9, 1992; Label: BNA; Formats: CD, cassette	65	15	—	—	—	MC: Gold; RIAA: Platinum
Merry Christmas from London (featuring the New World Philharmonic)	Released: October 19, 1993; Label: BNA; Formats: CD, cassette	115	26	—	—	19	
War Paint	Released: May 10, 1994; Label: BNA; Formats: CD, cassette	48	7	—	52	—	MC: Gold; RIAA: Gold
Greater Need	Released: June 4, 1996; Label: BNA; Formats: CD, cassette	62	8	—	—	9	RIAA: Gold
Shakin' Things Up	Released: August 12, 1997; Label: BNA; Formats: CD, cassette	98	9	—	—	—	RIAA: Gold
Secret Love	Released: September 29, 1998; Label: BNA; Formats: CD, cassette	—	36	—	—	—	
My Heart	Released: April 13, 1999; Label: BNA; Formats: CD, cassette	116	8	—	—	—	
I Finally Found Someone (with Sammy Kershaw)	Released: April 17, 2001; Label: RCA Nashville; Formats: CD, cassette	114	13	—	—	—	
Show Me How	Released: January 20, 2004; Label: Image; Formats: CD	—	49	30	—	—	
An Old Fashioned Christmas	Released: January 1, 2007; Label: St. Nicholas; Formats: Digital	—	—	—	—	—	
I Walk Alone	Released: 2008; Label: Country Crossing; Formats: CD, digital	—	—	—	—	—	
A Moment in Time	Released: October 27, 2009; Label: Country Crossing; Formats: CD, digital	—	40	38	—	—	
Dos Divas (with Pam Tillis)	Released: July 23, 2013; Label: Red River; Formats: CD, digital	—	62	—	—	—	
Letting Go...Slow	Released: February 12, 2016; Label: Shanachie; Formats: CD, digital	—	47	—	—	—	
A Picture of Me: Greatest Hits and More (re-recordings)	Released: March 18, 2016; Label: Cleopatra/Goldenlane; Formats: LP, CD, digital	—	—	—	—		
Come See Me and Come Lonely (with Pam Tillis)	Released: November 10, 2017; Label: Goldenlane; Formats: CD, digital	—	—	—	—	—	
Dead Girl Walking	Released: June 28, 2024; Label: Cleopatra; Formats: CD, LP, digital	—	—	—	—	—	
"—" denotes a recording that did not chart or was not released in that territory.

=== Compilation albums ===
List of albums, with selected chart positions and certifications, showing other relevant details
Title	Album details	Peak chart positions			Certifications
Title	Album details	US	US Cou.	CAN Cou.	Certifications
Trainwreck of Emotion	Released: April 27, 1993; Label: BNA; Formats: CD, cassette	—	—	—	
Reflections: Greatest Hits	Released: June 27, 1995; Label: BNA; Formats: CD, cassette	46	5	6	MC: Gold; RIAA: 2× Platinum
Super Hits	Released: March 24, 1998; Label: BNA; Formats: CD, cassette	—	53	—	
The Essential Lorrie Morgan	Released: June 2, 1998; Label: BNA; Formats: CD, cassette	—	73	—	
CMT Girls' Night Out (with Sara Evans, Mindy McCready and Martina McBride)	Released: October 12, 1999; Label: BNA; Formats: CD, cassette	—	30	8	
To Get to You: Greatest Hits Collection	Released: February 22, 2000; Label: BNA; Formats: CD, cassette	—	21	21	
RCA Country Legends	Released: April 9, 2002; Label: BMG Heritage/BNA/RCA; Formats: CD	—	—	—	
All American Country	Released: October 24, 2003; Label: BMG Special Products; Formats: CD, cassette	—	—	—	
"—" denotes a recording that did not chart or was not released in that territory.

=== Live albums ===
List of albums, with selected chart positions, showing other relevant details
Title	Album details	Peak chart positions	
Title	Album details	US Cou.	US Ind.
The Color of Roses	Released: March 12, 2002; Label: Image; Formats: CD	37	20

== Extended plays ==
List of extended plays, showing other relevant details
Title	Album details
Someday We'll Be Together	Released: April 28, 2023; Label: MCA Nashville; Formats: Digital

== Singles ==
=== As lead artist ===
List of singles, with selected chart positions, showing other relevant details
Title	Year	Peak chart positions			Album
Title	Year	US	US Cou.	CAN Cou.	Album
"Two People in Love"	1979	—	75	—	—N/a
"Tell Me I'm Only Dreaming"	1979	—	88	—	—N/a
"Someday We'll Be Together"	1983	—	—	—	—N/a
"Don't Go Changing"	1984	—	69	—	—N/a
"If You Came Back Tonight"	1984	—	—	—	—N/a
"Trainwreck of Emotion"	1988	—	20	—	Leave the Light On
"Dear Me"	1989	—	9	2	Leave the Light On
"Out of Your Shoes"	1989	—	2	3	Leave the Light On
"Five Minutes"	1989	—	1	9	Leave the Light On
"He Talks to Me"	1990	—	4	7	Leave the Light On
"We Both Walk"	1991	—	3	3	Something in Red
"A Picture of Me (Without You)"	1991	—	9	6	Something in Red
"Except for Monday"	1991	—	4	7	Something in Red
"Something in Red"	1992	—	14	10	Something in Red
"Watch Me"	1992	—	2	4	Watch Me
"What Part of No"	1992	—	1	1	Watch Me
"I Guess You Had to Be There"	1993	—	14	14	Watch Me
"Half Enough"	1993	—	8	14	Watch Me
"Crying Time"	1993	—	59	68	The Beverly Hillbillies (soundtrack)
"My Favorite Things" (Note: "My Favorite Things" re-charted at number 69 in 1999.)	1993	—	64	—	Merry Christmas from London
"My Night to Howl"	1994	—	31	56	War Paint
"If You Came Back from Heaven"	1994	—	51	71	War Paint
"Heart Over Mind"	1994	—	39	59	War Paint
"I Didn't Know My Own Strength"	1995	—	1	12	Reflections: Greatest Hits
"Back in Your Arms Again"	1995	—	4	12	Reflections: Greatest Hits
"Standing Tall"	1995	—	32	38	Reflections: Greatest Hits
"Sleigh Ride" (Note: "Sleigh Ride" charted at number 67 upon its initial release. It re-charted at number 64 in 1996 and number 42 in 1999.)	1995	—	42	—	Merry Christmas from London
"By My Side" (with Jon Randall)	1996	— (Note: "By My Side" did not enter the Billboard Hot 100, but peaked at number 10 on the Bubbling Under Hot 100 Singles chart, a 25-chart extension of the Hot 100.)	18	21	Greater Need
"I Just Might Be"	1996	—	45	57	Greater Need
"Good as I Was to You"	1996	—	4	17	Greater Need
"Go Away"	1997	85	3	3	Shakin' Things Up
"One of Those Nights Tonight"	1997	—	14	12	Shakin' Things Up
"I'm Not That Easy to Forget"	1998	—	49	69	Shakin' Things Up
"You Think He'd Know Me Better"	1998	—	66	—	Shakin' Things Up
"Maybe Not Tonight" (with Sammy Kershaw)	1999	86	17	24	My Heart
"Here I Go Again"	1999	—	72	—	My Heart
"To Get to You"	2000	—	63	—	To Get to You: Greatest Hits Collection
"Do You Still Want to Buy Me That Drink (Frank)"	2003	—	50	—	Show Me How
"Leavin' on Your Mind"	2009	—	—	—	A Moment in Time
"Wrapped Up in Love"	2012	—	—	—	—N/a
"A Picture of Me (Without You) [Kickin' Back]"	2022	—	—	—	—N/a
"—" denotes a recording that did not chart or was not released in that territory.

=== As a collaborative and featured artist ===
List of singles, with selected chart positions, showing other relevant details
Title	Year	Peak chart positions		Album
Title	Year	US Cou.	CAN Cou.	Album
"I'm Completely Satisfied with You" (with George Morgan)	1979	93	—	—N/a
"'Til a Tear Becomes a Rose" (Keith Whitley with Lorrie Morgan)	1990	13	13	Greatest Hits
"Let's Open Up Our Hearts" (credited with various artists) (Note: Charity single benefiting the Project H.O.S.S. (Help Our Schools Survive) and featuring Lorrie Morgan and 56 other country artists.))	1991	—	—	—N/a
"Hope" (credited with various artists) (Note: Charity single benefiting the T.J. Martell Foundation and featuring John Berry, Terri Clark, Vince Gill, Faith Hill, Tracy Lawrence, Little Texas, Neal McCoy, Tim McGraw, Lorrie Morgan, Marty Stuart, Travis Tritt, and Trisha Yearwood.)	1996	57	—	—N/a
"Don't Worry Baby" (The Beach Boys with Lorrie Morgan)	1996	73	—	Stars and Stripes Vol. 1
"He Drinks Tequila" (with Sammy Kershaw)	2001	39	—	I Finally Found Someone
"I Finally Found Someone" (with Sammy Kershaw)	2001	—	—	I Finally Found Someone
"I Know What You Did Last Night" (with Pam Tillis)	2013	—	—	Dos Divas
"I Am a Woman" (with Pam Tillis)	2013	—	—	Dos Divas
"That's Where I Wanna Take Our Love" (with Corey Farlow)	2021	—	—	—N/a
"—" denotes a recording that did not chart or was not released in that territory.

== Videography ==
=== Video albums ===
List of albums, showing all relevant details
Title	Album details
War Paint – Video Hits	Released: October 11, 1994; Label: BNA; Formats: VHS
Video Hits	Released: April 20, 2004; Label: BMG Special Products; Formats: DVD

=== Music videos ===
List of music videos, showing year released and director
Title	Year	Director(s)	Ref.
"Trainwreck of Emotion"	1988	Stephen Buck	
"Dear Me"	1989	Stephen Buck	
"Out of Your Shoes"	1989	Stephen Buck	
"He Talks to Me"	1990	—N/a	
"We Both Walk"	1991	Bob Small	
"Let's Open Up Our Hearts"	1991	Dean Lent	
"A Picture of Me (Without You)"	1991	Jack Cole	
"Something in Red"	1992	Jim Shea	
"Watch Me"	1992	Sherman Halsey	
"I Guess You Had to Be There"	1993	Sherman Halsey	
"Half Enough"	1993	Sherman Halsey	
"Beverly Hillbillies Medley" (with Joe Diffie and Jim Varney)	1993	Charley Randazzo	
"My Favorite Things"	1993	Matt Lester	
"My Night to Howl"	1994	Kenny Ortega	
"If You Came Back from Heaven"	1994	Roger Pistole	
"I Didn't Know My Own Strength"	1995	Steven Goldmann	
"Standing Tall"	1995	Steven Goldmann	
"Good as I Was to You"	1996	Michael Salomon	
"Go Away"	1997	Jim Hershleder	
"Maybe Not Tonight" (with Sammy Kershaw)	1999	Steven Goldmann	
"Leavin' on Your Mind"	2009	—N/a	
