= To Get to You: Greatest Hits Collection =

Greatest hits album by Lorrie Morgan
- Released: February 22, 2000
- Genre: Country
- Length: 61:08
- Label: BNA
- Producer: Jerry Crutchfield

Lorrie Morgan chronology
My Heart (1999)	To Get to You: Greatest Hits Collection (2000)	I Finally Found Someone (2001)

Professional ratings
Review scores
Source	Rating
Allmusic	4/5 stars
Entertainment Weekly	B
Robert Christgau	(neither)

To Get to You: Greatest Hits Collection is the second greatest hits compilation album by American country music artist Lorrie Morgan. It was released by BNA Records in February 2000. There were four new songs on this album - "Whoop-De-Do", "To Get to You", "If I Cry", and a live cover of the Sarah McLachlan song, "Angel". The only song released as a single was "To Get to You", which peaked at #63 on the Billboard Hot Country Singles & Tracks chart. The album peaked at #21 on the Top Country Albums chart.

== Track listing ==
1. "We Both Walk" (Tom Shapiro, Chris Waters) – 3:05
2. "Half Enough" (Wendy Waldman, Reed Nielsen) – 3:48
3. "Another Lonely Song" (Billy Sherrill, Norro Wilson, Tammy Wynette) – 2:38
4. "Whoop-De-Do" (Craig Carothers, Angela Kaset) – 3:27
5. "By My Side" (Constant Change) – 3:09
  - duet with Jon Randall
6. "Good as I Was to You" (Don Schlitz, Billy Livsey) – 3:25
7. "Go Away" (Stephony Smith, Cathy Majeski, Sunny Russ) – 2:50
8. "To Get to You" (Brett James, Holly Lamar) – 3:57
9. "One of Those Nights Tonight" (Susan Longacre, Rick Giles) – 3:51
10. "Maybe Not Tonight" (Keith Stegall, Dan Hill) – 4:06
  - duet with Sammy Kershaw
11. "I Guess You Had to Be There" (Jon Robbin, Barbara Cloyd) – 4:10
12. "Trainwreck of Emotion" (Jon Vezner, Alan Rhody) – 3:07
13. "If I Cry" (John Bettis, Trey Bruce, Brian D. Siewert) – 4:00
14. "Standing Tall" (Larry Butler, Ben Peters) – 3:03
15. "He Talks to Me" (Mike Reid, Rory Bourke) – 3:27
16. "Something in Red" (Kaset) – 4:40
17. "Angel" (Sarah McLachlan) – 4:33

== Chart performance ==
Chart (2000)	Peak position
U.S. Billboard Top Country Albums	21
Canadian RPM Country Albums	21
