= Reflections: Greatest Hits =

- Original limited edition cover

Compilation album by Lorrie Morgan
- Released: June 27, 1995
- Recorded: 1988–1995
- Genre: Country
- Length: 38:35
- Label: BNA
- Producers: Barry Beckett, Garth Fundis, Richard Landis, Mike Love, Blake Mevis, Doug Rich, James Stroud, Joe Thomas, Brian Wilson

Lorrie Morgan chronology
War Paint (1994)	Reflections: Greatest Hits (1995)	Greater Need (1996)

Singles from Reflections: Greatest Hits
- 1. "I Didn't Know My Own Strength" Released: c. May 6, 1995; 2. "Back in Your Arms Again" Released: August 28, 1995; 3. "Standing Tall" Released: September 1995

Reflections: Greatest Hits is the first compilation album by American country music artist Lorrie Morgan. It was released on Morgan's birthday, June 27, 1995 as a limited edition. It featured three previously unreleased tracks, an enclosed biography of Lorrie Morgan and ornate packaging.

On July 15, 1995, Reflections: Greatest Hits debuted on Billboard's Top Country Albums chart. Morgan won the "Hot Shot Debut" award for an impressive number 5 debut on the country albums chart. It also debuted on the Billboard 200 at number 54.

== Overview ==
All three previously unreleased songs on the Reflections: Greatest Hits compilation were released as a single. The first, "I Didn't Know My Own Strength" was released in advance of the album and had been on the Hot Country Singles & Tracks chart for 11 weeks when the album debuted. The album's second single, "Back in Your Arms Again", was released on August 28, 1995. The singles reached numbers one and four on the Billboard Hot Country Singles & Tracks chart respectively. "Standing Tall", a cover of Billie Jo Spears' 1980 single, was released in September 1995 and peaked at number 32 in early 1996.

The remaining tracks on the album include two hits from Leave the Light On, three from Something in Red, two from Watch Me, and the #13 duet with Morgan's then husband Keith Whitley, "'Til a Tear Becomes a Rose", which originally appeared on Whitley's own Greatest Hits album in 1990. Reflections peaked at number five on the Top Country Albums chart and number 46 on the Billboard 200.

== Track listing ==
CD
No.	Title	Writer(s)	Length
1.	"Five Minutes"	Beth Nielsen Chapman	3:34
2.	"Dear Me"	Carson Whitsett, Scott Mateer	3:45
3.	"Except for Monday"	Reed Nielsen	2:54
4.	"A Picture of Me (Without You)"	Norro Wilson, George Richey	3:37
5.	"Watch Me"	Tom Shapiro, Gary Burr	3:34
6.	"Something in Red"	Angela Kaset	4:35
7.	"Back in Your Arms Again"	J. Fred Knobloch, Paul Davis	3:43
8.	"I Didn't Know My Own Strength"	Rick Bowles, Robert Byrne	3:19
9.	"Standing Tall"	Larry Butler, Ben Peters	3:03
10.	"What Part of No"	Wayne Perry, Gerald Smith	2:43
11.	"'Til a Tear Becomes a Rose" (duet with Keith Whitley)	Bill Rice, Sharon Vaughn	3:29
Total length:			38:16

1996 re-issue
No.	Title	Writer(s)	Length
1.	"Five Minutes"	Beth Nielsen Chapman	3:34
2.	"Dear Me"	Carson Whitsett, Scott Mateer	3:45
3.	"Except for Monday"	Reed Nielsen	2:54
4.	"A Picture of Me (Without You)"	Norro Wilson, George Richey	3:37
5.	"Watch Me"	Tom Shapiro, Gary Burr	3:34
6.	"Something in Red"	Angela Kaset	4:35
7.	"Back in Your Arms Again"	J. Fred Knobloch, Paul Davis	3:43
8.	"I Didn't Know My Own Strength"	Rick Bowles, Robert Byrne	3:19
9.	"Don't Worry Baby" (with The Beach Boys)	Brian Wilson, Roger Christian	3:16
10.	"What Part of No"	Wayne Perry, Gerald Smith	2:43
11.	"'Til a Tear Becomes a Rose" (with Keith Whitley)	Bill Rice, Sharon Rice	3:29
Total length:			38:29

== Personnel on new tracks ==
Adapted from liner notes.

'"Back in Your Arms Again"

- Larry Byrom – acoustic guitar
- Paul Franklin – steel guitar
- John Hobbs – piano
- Dann Huff – electric guitar
- Jana King – background vocals
- Paul Leim – drums
- Lorrie Morgan – lead vocals
- Leland Sklar – bass guitar
- Glenn Worf – bass guitar
- Curtis Wright – background vocals
- Curtis Young – background vocals

"I Didn't Know My Own Strength" and "Standing Tall"

- Larry Byrom – acoustic guitar
- Glen Duncan – fiddle
- Stuart Duncan – fiddle
- Paul Franklin – steel guitar
- John Hobbs – piano
- Dann Huff – electric guitar
- Jana King – background vocals
- Paul Leim – drums
- Lorrie Morgan – lead vocals
- Leland Sklar – bass guitar
- Curtis Wright – background vocals
- Curtis Young – background vocals

== Charts ==
=== Weekly charts ===
Chart (1995)	Peak position
Canadian Country Albums (RPM)	6
US Billboard 200	46
US Top Country Albums (Billboard)	5

=== Year-end charts ===
Chart (1995)	Position
US Top Country Albums (Billboard)	41
Chart (1996)	Position
US Top Country Albums (Billboard)	41

== Certifications ==
Region	Certification	Certified units/sales
Canada (Music Canada)	Gold	50,000^{^}
United States (RIAA)	2× Platinum	2,000,000^{^}
^{^} Shipments figures based on certification alone.
