= Letting Go...Slow =

Studio album by Lorrie Morgan
- Released: February 12, 2016
- Genre: Country
- Length: 46:36
- Label: Shanachie
- Producer: Richard Landis

Lorrie Morgan chronology
Dos Divas (2013)	Letting Go...Slow (2016)	A Picture of Me: Greatest Hits and More (2016)

Letting Go...Slow is a studio album by American country artist, Lorrie Morgan. It was released on February 12, 2016, via Shanachie Records and contained 12 tracks. The project was Morgan's sixteenth studio album and her first album of solo material in seven years. The album contained both original material and cover recordings. The album received mixed reviews from critics and reached the American country albums chart.

== Background ==
Lorrie Morgan had been among country music's most commercially-successful recording artists during the 1990s. A string of her singles reached the country chart top ten, including three number one singles: "Five Minutes" (1990), "What Part of No" (1992) and "I Didn't Know My Own Strength" (1995). With the exception of a collaborative album in 2013 with Pam Tillis, Morgan had not released a proper studio album of solo material since 2009's A Moment in Time. According to Morgan, she had lost motivation after listening to contemporary country radio. "I wasn't happy with the music I was hearing, what was being played on the radio, and what radio thought were great songs, I thought were not great songs. So I just kinda lost my confidence in, did I think I could do a good job on a new album?", she told Taste of Country.

In an interview with Florida Today, Morgan also explained that the lack of finding a label also accounted for the delay in making the album. Morgan's divorce from ex-husband and country artist, Sammy Kershaw, also added a delay in recording. "My last divorce with Sammy Kershaw was one of the hardest things I ever experienced in my life," she explained in 2016. The album's future title track inspired the project's creation. Penned by Morgan's daughter-in-law (Ashley Hewitt), the song captured the pain of letting go from a relationship. "And when I heard ‘Letting You Go Slow’, it just took me back to that pain and I said, ‘I need to sing about this. I’ve got to sing about this’," she told Parade.

== Recording and content ==
Letting Go...Slow contained a total of 12 tracks and was produced by Richard Landis. Landis had produced many of Morgan's previous albums and she enjoyed collaborating with him again. His "out of the box ideas" and introduction to various musical collaborators prompted her to work with him for the project again. Morgan chose material that would please her fans rather than please radio. Some of the recordings had been songs she had wanted to record for 20 years. Letting Go...Slow mixed both original recordings and covers of previously recorded material. Among the album's covers is Patsy Cline's "Strange" and Bobbie Gentry's "Ode to Billie Joe". She also covered several songs by male artists, such as Vern Gosdin's "Is It Raining at Your House", Bob Dylan's "Lay Lady Lay" and Earl Thomas Conley's "What I'd Say". Original material included "Jesus & Hairspray" and "How Does It Feel". The latter recording featured writing credits from Morgan herself.

== Release, chart performance and reception ==
Professional ratings
Review scores
Source	Rating
AllMusic	3/5 stars

Letting Go...Slow was released on February 12, 2016, on Shanachie Records. It was offered as a compact disc, music download and for streaming purposes. It was her first solo album to make the American Billboard Top Country Albums survey since 2009. It spent one week on the Country Albums survey in March 2016, peaking at number 47. The album received mixed reception from critics and journalists. Stephen Thomas Erlewine of AllMusic, gave the project three out of five possible stars. Erlewine favored the "relaxing gait" of the album's production and sound. "What's best about Letting Go…Slow is its relaxed conversational intimacy: this plays not like a missive from a star but like a long, lazy talk between old friends," he concluded. Meanwhile, Robert Loy of Country Standard Time criticized the album. Loy disliked Morgan's choices of covering material from previous artists, such as "Ode to Billie Joe" and "Lay Lady Lay". He also cited her habit of smoking cigarettes to be unfavorable to the sound of the record. "Sorry, Lorrie, but maybe it's those comeback dreams you ought to let go," Loy concluded.

== Track listing ==
CD and digital versions
No.	Title	Writer(s)	Length
1.	"Strange"	Fred Burch; Mel Tillis	2:40
2.	"Ode to Billie Joe"	Bobbie Gentry	5:45
3.	"Is It Raining at Your House"	Hank Cochran; Dean Dillon; Vern Gosdin	3:25
4.	"Something About Trains"	Christopher Crockett	3:56
5.	"I've Done Enough Dying Today"	Larry Gatlin	4:32
6.	"Lay Lady Lay"	Bob Dylan	4:24
7.	"Slow"	Ashley Hewitt; Dean Sams	3:37
8.	"Spilt Milk"	Jimmy Hogarth; Kristina Train; Francis White	4:19
9.	"Jesus & Hairspray"	Katie Kessler; Don Poythress	3:03
10.	"Lonely Whiskey"	Paul Sikes; Jennifer Zuffinetti	3:37
11.	"What I'd Say"	Robert Byrne; Will Robinson	3:39
12.	"How Does It Feel"	Kelly Lang; Lorrie Morgan; Mark Oliverius	3:39
Total length:			46:36

== Personnel ==
All credits are adapted from the liner notes of Letting Go...Slow and AllMusic.

Musical personnel

- Pat Bergeson – Harmonica
- Steve Brewster – Drums
- Pat Buchanan – Electric guitar
- Billy Davis Jr. – Background vocals
- Chip Davis – Background vocals
- Larry Franklin – Fiddle
- Steve Hinson – Dobro, steel guitar
- Jim Horn – Flute
- Rodney Ingle – Background vocals
- Lorrie Morgan – Lead vocals
- Wendy Moten – Background vocals
- Jimmy Nichols – Keyboards
- Dave Pomeroy – Bass
- Bobby Terry – Acoustic guitar
- Ashley Hewitt Whitley – Background vocals

Technical personnel

- Austin Atwood – Assistant
- Lorien Babajian – Design
- Jim DeMain – Mastering
- Richard Landis – Arranger, producer
- Matt Legge – Engineer, mixing
- Amy Marie – Assistant
- Matt Spicher – Photography

== Chart performance ==
Chart (2016)	Peak position
US Top Country Albums (Billboard)	47

== Release history ==
Region	Date	Format	Label	Ref.
North America	February 12, 2016	Compact disc; music download; streaming	Shanachie Records	
