= By My Side =

By My Side may refer to:

- By My Side (album), a 2010 album by David Choi, or the title song
- "By My Side" (INXS song), 1991
- "By My Side" (Jadakiss song), 2009
- "By My Side" (Lorrie Morgan and Jon Randall song), 1996
- "By My Side", a song by 3 Doors Down, from their album The Better Life, 2000
- "By My Side", a song by Ben Harper, from his album Fight for Your Mind, 1995
- "By My Side", a song by Kasabian, from their album Empire, 2006
- "By My Side", a song by Little River Band, from their album First Under the Wire, 1979
- "By My Side", a song from the musical Godspell, 1971
- By My Side (TV series), a Singaporean Chinese drama released in 2008
- By My Side (film), a 2017 film directed by Reuben Kang
- "By My Side", a song by A7S, from the soundtrack of Blade Runner: Black Lotus, 2021
