= I Didn't Know My Own Strength =

I Didn't Know My Own Strength may refer to:

- I Didn't Know My Own Strength (Lorrie Morgan song), a country music song
- I Didn't Know My Own Strength (Whitney Houston song), a power ballad
