= Craig Carothers =

American singer-songwriter

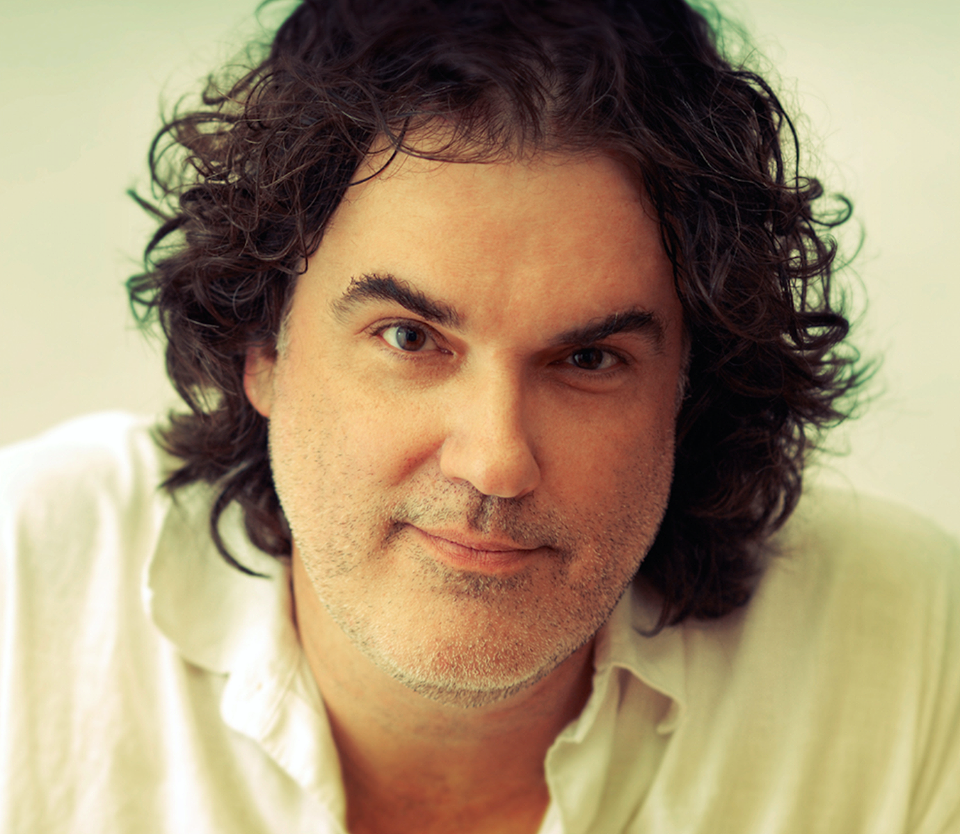

Background information
- Origin: Portland, Oregon
- Genres: Singer-Songwriter
- Instrument(s): Guitar, Bass, Voice, Kife
- Years active: 1975–present
- Labels: Dwight Rabbit
- Past members: Tim Ellis
- Website: www.craigcarothers.com

Craig Carothers is an American singer-songwriter originally from Portland, Oregon, who now lives in Nashville, Tennessee. Carothers's "Little Hercules" was recorded for Trisha Yearwood's 1996 album Everybody Knows. The record went gold.

== Biography ==
Carothers grew up in the Pacific Northwest. His parents, both public school music teachers, introduced him to a wide range of music, including jazz, gospel, classical, and blues. Carothers also cites a number of Motown, pop, and folk influences.

Early in his career, most of his performances were in the Pacific Northwest, playing primarily in his hometown of Portland, Oregon. During those years he shared the stage with a range of notable acts, including Bruce Cockburn, Donovan, John Gorka, John Hiatt, Patty Larkin, Michael McDonald, Anne Murray, Richard Thompson, and David Wilcox.

In 1995, Carothers began taking trips to Nashville, and other Southern cities, Birmingham, Atlanta, Houston, and Little Rock. Some of his performances at Nashville's Bluebird Café were featured on the Nashville Public Radio program Players and Poets.

Later that year, Country music artist, Trisha Yearwood recorded his song, "Little Hercules," leading to a Gold record. A publishing deal followed, and over the next few years a number of other artists recorded songs written or co-written by Carothers, including: Berkley Hart, Kathy Mattea, Kate Markowitz, Lorrie Morgan, Peter, Paul and Mary, Sons of the Desert, and Andrea Zonn, to name a few.

In 2000, Carothers moved to Nashville and has continued to tour more widely ever since.

Other notable accomplishments include:

- Writing songs for an indie film called The Californians, including the title track.
- Being one of the winners of the Mountain Stage NewSong Festival in Shepherdstown, West Virginia in 2006.
- Joining the faculty of the NSAI (Nashville Songwriters Association International) song camp.
- Teaching at the Swannanoa Gathering in Black Mountain, North Carolina.
- In 2012, Carothers became an adjunct professor at University of Miami's Frost School of Music.

When not traveling to perform at dozens of shows each year, Carothers continues to write, produce, and teach.

Carothers' latest studio album, Alpenglow, was released in late 2016, and features two songs co-written with Bruce Hornsby, "Alpenglow" and "Alma Mater."

== Discography ==
- Haunted (1981, Nebula Circle)
- Go 90 (with Dan Brandt and Kip Richardson) (1984, Silent)
- Greenhouse FX (Craig Carothers and The Nerve) (1990, Silent)
- Home Remedy (1994, Silent)
- The Craig Carothers Trio (featuring Gary Ogan and Tim Ellis) (1994, Silent)
- Air Mail Blue (1996, Silent)
- Acoustic Set [live] (featuring Tim Ellis) (1998, Dwight Rabbit)
- The Card (2002, Dwight Rabbit)
- one revolution (2003, Dwight Rabbit)
- Solo (2006, Dwight Rabbit)
- Nothing Fancy (2008, Dwight Rabbit)
- Inventory [anthology] (2009, Dwight Rabbit)
- The Vagabond (2012, Dwight Rabbit)
- 2-FBYCR (with Don Henry) (2013, Dwight Rabbit)
- Live at the Woodshed (with Steve Seskin and Don Henry) (2014, CHJS LTD)
- Roadwork [live] (2015, Dwight Rabbit)
- Alpenglow (2016, Dwight Rabbit)
- The Prequel (2017, Dwight Rabbit)
- 39 Pink Flamingos (2022)

== Songs Covered ==
A number of songs written or cowritten by Carothers have been recorded by other artists. A few examples are:

- "BFD" – recorded by Kathy Mattea, Berkley Hart, Don Henry
- "I Can Count on You" (Craig Carothers, Angela Kaset) – recorded by Lorrie Morgan for Show Me How (2004)
- "Invisible People" (Craig Carothers, Gene Nelson) – recorded by Peter, Paul and Mary for In These Times (2003)
- "I Won't Let Go" – recorded by Kate Markowitz for Map of the World (2003)
- "Little Hercules" – recorded by Trisha Yearwood for Everybody Knows (1996)
- "Welcome the Rain" – recorded by Andrea Zonn for Love Goes On (2003)
- "Whoop-De-Do" (Craig Carothers, Angela Kaset) – recorded by Lorrie Morgan for To Get to You: Greatest Hits Collection (2000)
