= Watch Me (album) =

Studio album by Lorrie Morgan
- Released: October 6, 1992
- Recorded: January–March 1992
- Genre: Country
- Label: BNA
- Producer: Richard Landis

Lorrie Morgan chronology
Something in Red (1991)	Watch Me (1992)	Merry Christmas from London (1993)

Singles from Watch Me
- 1. "Watch Me" Released: August 1992; 2. "What Part of No" Released: December 7, 1992; 3. "I Guess You Had to Be There" Released: February 1993; 4. "Half Enough" Released: June 1993

Professional ratings
Review scores
Source	Rating
Allmusic	4.5/5 stars
Entertainment Weekly	B
Los Angeles Times	2.5/4 stars

Watch Me is the third studio album by American country music singer Lorrie Morgan. The album was her first for BNA Records. It was released on 9 October 1992. It peaked at #15 on the Billboard country albums chart, and includes the singles "Watch Me" (#2) "What Part of No" (#1), "I Guess You Had to Be There" (#14), and "Half Enough" (#8). Also included on this album is a cover of "It's a Heartache", a song previously recorded by Bonnie Tyler and Juice Newton.

Jimmy Griffin, Richard Mainegra, and Rick Yancey are all featured as background vocalists on this album. At the time, these three musicians recorded on BNA as The Remingtons. Mainegra and Yancey also wrote the last track, "She's Takin' Him Back Again", which was omitted from the cassette version of Watch Me.

== Track listing ==
No.	Title	Writer(s)	Length
1.	"Half Enough"	Wendy Waldman, Reed Nielsen	3:50
2.	"I Guess You Had to Be There"	Jon Robbin, Barbara Cloyd	4:10
3.	"What Part of No"	Wayne Perry, Gerald Smith	2:46
4.	"You Leave Me Like This"	Skip Ewing	2:53
5.	"Someone to Call Me Darling"	Dale Daniel, Naomi Martin	2:52
6.	"Watch Me"	Tom Shapiro, Gary Burr	3:37
7.	"Behind His Last Goodbye"	Charles Harter, Smith	3:30
8.	"It's a Heartache"	Ronnie Scott, Steve Wolfe	4:29
9.	"From Our House to Yours"	Angela Kaset	3:49
10.	"She's Takin' Him Back Again"	Richard Mainegra, Rick Yancey	2:56

== Production ==
- Richard Landis - producer
- Chuck Ainlay - engineer, mixing
- Jeff Giedt - assistant engineer
- Russ Martin - mixing assistant
- Denny Purcell - mastering
- Grahame Smith - assistant engineer
- Ed Thacker - engineer

== Personnel ==
As listed in liner notes.

- Michael Black – background vocals
- Mark E. Blumberg – keyboards
- Jessica Bouchér – background vocals
- Larry Byrom – acoustic guitar
- Dale Daniel – background vocals
- Glen Duncan – fiddle, mandolin
- Sonny Garrish – steel guitar
- Steve Gibson – acoustic guitar, electric guitar
- Jimmy Griffin – background vocals
- Mitch Humphries – keyboards
- John Barlow Jarvis – keyboards
- Angela Kaset – background vocals
- Jerome Kimbrough – acoustic guitar
- Paul Leim – drums, percussion
- Richard Mainegra – background vocals
- Carl Marsh – keyboards
- Tom Roady – percussion
- Lisa Silver – background vocals
- Dennis Wilson – background vocals
- Glenn Worf – bass guitar
- Rick Yancey – background vocals
- Curtis "Mr. Harmony" Young – background vocals

== Charts ==
=== Weekly charts ===
Chart (1992–1993)	Peak position
US Billboard 200	65
US Top Country Albums (Billboard)	15

=== Year-end charts ===
Chart (1993)	Position
US Billboard 200	99
US Top Country Albums (Billboard)	22
Chart (1994)	Position
US Top Country Albums (Billboard)	72
