= Half Enough =

Single by Lorrie Morgan

from the album Watch Me
- B-side: "It's a Heartache"
- Released: June 1993
- Genre: Country
- Length: 3:50
- Label: BNA
- Songwriters: Wendy Waldman; Reed Nielsen
- Producer: Richard Landis

Lorrie Morgan singles chronology
"I Guess You Had to Be There" (1993)	"Half Enough" (1993)	"My Night to Howl" (1994)

"Half Enough" is a song written by Reed Nielsen and Wendy Waldman, and recorded by American country music artist Lorrie Morgan. It was released in June 1993 as the fourth and final single from her album Watch Me. The song reached number eight on the Billboard Hot Country Singles & Tracks chart in November 1993.

== Chart performance ==
Chart (1993)	Peak position
Canada Country Singles (RPM)	14
US Hot Country Songs (Billboard)	8

== Music video ==
The music video for "Half Enough" was directed and produced by Sherman Halsey.
