= Secret Love (Lorrie Morgan album) =

Studio album by Lorrie Morgan
- Released: September 29, 1998
- Genre: Country
- Label: BNA
- Producer: Richard Landis

Lorrie Morgan chronology
Shakin' Things Up (1997)	Secret Love (1998)	My Heart (1999)

Secret Love is the seventh studio album by Lorrie Morgan, released in 1998. She dedicated this album to her late father, George Morgan. The album includes cover versions of pop standards. It peaked at number 36 on the Billboard Country Album chart.

== Critical reception ==
Professional ratings
Review scores
Source	Rating
AllMusic	4/5 stars
Entertainment Weekly	B−

Charlotte Dillon of AllMusic praised Morgan's vocal delivery and the instrumentation. Giving it a B−, Alanna Nash of Entertainment Weekly wrote that "Although Lorrie displays some aptitude for the genre, her reading of the lyrics…is overly melodramatic and she fails to give the material the shading and nuance that could make this brave outing more than a vanity recording. "

== Track listing ==
1. "Once Upon a Time" (Lee Adams, Charles Strouse) – 4:46
2. "Here's That Rainy Day" (Johnny Burke, Jimmy Van Heusen) – 4:13
3. "Good Morning Heartache" (Ervin Drake, Dan Fisher, Irene Higginbotham) – 4:43
4. "I've Got the World on a String" (Harold Arlen, Ted Koehler) – 2:39
5. "Secret Love" (Sammy Fain, Paul Francis Webster) – 4:49
6. "My Foolish Heart" (Victor Young, Ned Washington) – 4:07
7. "Summer of '42 (The Summer Knows)" (Alan Bergman, Marilyn Bergman, Michel Legrand) – 3:58
8. "They Can't Take That Away from Me" (George Gershwin, Ira Gershwin) – 3:04
9. "I Wish You Love" (Albert Beach, Charles Trenet) – 4:40
10. "Fly Me to the Moon" (Bart Howard) – 3:34
11. "An Affair to Remember (Our Love Affair)" (Harold Adamson, Leo McCarey, Harry Warren) – 4:39

== Personnel ==
Compiled from liner notes.

Musicians

- Beegie Adair - piano
- Tom Bruner - guitar on "Fly Me to the Moon"
- Jim Ferguson - bass guitar
- Barry Green - trombone on "Here's That Rainy Day", "They Can't Take That Away from Me", and "Secret Love"
- David Hungate - guitar
- Nashville String Machine - strings
- Dennis Solee - tenor saxophone on "Good Morning Heartache" and "Fly Me to the Moon"
- Jim White - drums

Technical

- Tom Bruner - conduction, arrangement
- Ricky Cobble - recording
- John Guess - recording, mixing
- Richard Landis - production
- Bob Ludwig - mastering

== Chart performance ==
Chart (1998)	Peak position
U.S. Billboard Top Country Albums	36
