= Back in Your Arms Again =

Single by Lorrie Morgan

from the album Greatest Hits
- B-side: "My Favorite Things"
- Released: August 28, 1995
- Recorded: 1995
- Genre: Country
- Length: 3:43
- Label: BNA
- Songwriters: J. Fred Knobloch; Paul Davis
- Producer: James Stroud

Lorrie Morgan singles chronology
"I Didn't Know My Own Strength" (1995)	"Back in Your Arms Again" (1995)	"Standing Tall" (1996)

"Back in Your Arms Again" is a song written by Paul Davis and J. Fred Knobloch, and recorded by American country music artist Lorrie Morgan. It was released in August 1995 as the second single from her Greatest Hits compilation album. The song reached #4 on the Billboard Hot Country Singles & Tracks chart in November 1995.

== Chart performance ==
Chart (1995)	Peak position
Canada Country Singles (RPM)	12
US Hot Country Songs (Billboard)	4
