= Merry Christmas from London =

Studio album by Lorrie Morgan
- Released: October 19, 1993
- Genre: Country
- Label: BNA
- Producer: Richard Landis

Lorrie Morgan chronology
Watch Me (1992)	Merry Christmas from London (1993)	War Paint (1994)

Professional ratings
Review scores
Source	Rating
Allmusic	link
Chicago Tribune	link

Merry Christmas from London is an album of Christmas music, released in 1993 by country music artist Lorrie Morgan. It features duets with guest stars Andy Williams ("Little Snow Girl"), Johnny Mathis ("Blue Snowfall"), and Tammy Wynette ("A Christmas Festival," a medley of several traditional Christmas songs). The New World Philharmonic and Choir provide traditional orchestral and vocal backing throughout the album.

== Track listing ==
1. "My Favorite Things" (Richard Rodgers, Oscar Hammerstein II) – 3:44
2. "A Christmas Festival" (medley of "Jingle Bells", "God Rest Ye Merry Gentlemen", "Deck the Halls", "O Come All Ye Faithful", "Hark! The Herald Angels Sing", "Joy to the World", "Silent Night" and "The First Noel") (public domain) – 8:51
  - feat. Tammy Wynette
3. "Little Snow Girl" (Robert Arthur) – 3:52
  - feat. Andy Williams
4. "Up on Santa Claus Mountain" (George Morgan) – 4:10
5. "O Holy Night" (public domain) – 3:14
6. "Let It Snow, Let It Snow, Let It Snow" (Jule Styne, Sammy Cahn) – 2:33
7. "Blue Snowfall" (Dave Coleman) – 3:55
  - feat. Johnny Mathis
8. "Toyland" (public domain) – 3:30
9. "Sleigh Ride" (Mitchell Parish, Leroy Anderson) – 3:00
10. "Ave Maria" (public domain) – 4:56

== Chart performance ==
Chart (1993)	Peak position
U.S. Billboard Top Country Albums	26
U.S. Billboard 200	115
Canadian RPM Country Albums	19
