= Show Me How (album) =

Country music album by Lorrie Morgan

Studio album by Lorrie Morgan
- Released: January 20, 2004
- Genre: Country
- Length: 39:04
- Label: Image Entertainment
- Producer: Richard Landis

Lorrie Morgan chronology
I Finally Found Someone (2001)	Show Me How (2004)	A Moment in Time (2009)

Professional ratings
Review scores
Source	Rating
About.com	4/5 stars
Allmusic	4/5 stars

Show Me How is the ninth studio album by American country music artist Lorrie Morgan. It was released by Image Entertainment on January 20, 2004. Its first single, "Do You Still Want to Buy Me That Drink (Frank)", peaked at #50 on the Billboard Hot Country Singles & Tracks chart. The album peaked at #49 on the Top Country Albums chart.

== Track listing ==
1. "Do You Still Wanna Buy Me That Drink (Frank)" (Roxie Dean, Buffy Lawson, Patrick Matthews) – 3:31
2. "Used" (Bekka Bramlett, James House, James T. Slater) – 3:52
3. "Bombshell" (Louise Dorsey, Lawson) – 2:46
4. "I Can Count on You" (Craig Carothers, Angela Kaset) – 4:19
5. "Show Me How" (Gordon Kennedy, Wayne Kirkpatrick, Jessica Simpson) – 3:36
6. "Us Girls" (Amy Dalley, Kaset, Lee Thomas Miller) – 3:15
7. "The Wedding" (Kaset, J. Fred Knobloch) – 3:15
8. "One Less Monkey" (Kaset, Kim Patton-Johnston) – 3:29
9. "Charlie and Betty" (Lorrie Morgan) – 2:56
10. "Another Winter Without You" (Eddie Alexander, Marty Morgan) – 4:13
11. "Rocks" (Marv Green, Chris Lindsey, Aimee Mayo) – 3:52

== Personnel ==
- Susan Ashton – background vocals
- Michael Black – background vocals
- Bekka Bramlett – background vocals
- Chris Bushong – assistant engineer, congas
- Larry Byrom – acoustic guitar
- Chip Davis – background vocals
- Kim Fleming – background vocals
- Paul Franklin – steel guitar
- Tony Green – engineer, mixing
- Vicki Hampton – background vocals
- Aubrey Haynie – fiddle, mandolin
- Mitch Humphries – piano
- John Barlow Jarvis – piano
- Chuck Jones – photography
- Gordon Kennedy – electric guitar
- Alison Krauss – background vocals
- Richard Landis – bass guitar, liner notes, percussion, electric piano, producer, synthesizer
- Paul Leim – drums
- Brent Mason – electric guitar
- Blair Masters – synthesizer
- Lorrie Morgan – lead vocals
- Jimmy Nichols – synthesizer
- Dave Pomeroy – bas dessus
- John Wesley Ryles – background vocals
- Lisa Silver – background vocals
- Rhonda Vincent – background vocals
- Cindy Richardson-Walker – background vocals
- Dennis Wilson – background vocals

== Chart performance ==
Chart (2004)	Peak position
U.S. Billboard Top Country Albums	49
U.S. Billboard Top Independent Albums	30
