= Maybe Not Tonight =

Studio album by Sammy Kershaw
- Released: April 13, 1999
- Genre: Country
- Length: 47:13
- Label: Mercury Nashville
- Producer: Keith Stegall

Sammy Kershaw chronology
Labor of Love (1997)	Maybe Not Tonight (1999)	Covers the Hits (2000)

Singles from Maybe Not Tonight
- 1. "Maybe Not Tonight" Released: February 27, 1999; 2. "When You Love Someone" Released: August 14, 1999; 3. "Me and Maxine" Released: November 27, 1999

Professional ratings
Review scores
Source	Rating
Allmusic	link
Country Standard Time	(not rated) link

Maybe Not Tonight is the sixth studio album by American country music artist Sammy Kershaw. It was released in 1999 (see 1999 in country music) on Mercury Records. The first album of his career not to achieve an RIAA certification, it also failed to produce any Top Ten country hits. The lead-off single, which was the title track duet with Lorrie Morgan (also included on her 1999 album My Heart) reached #17 on the country charts. This song was concurrently promoted by Mercury and BNA Records, Morgan's label. Following it were "When You Love Someone" at #37 and "Me and Maxine" at #35. "Louisiana Hot Sauce", the fourth and final single, failed to chart. Also included is a cover of Bobby Vee's "More Than I Can Say", which water later a #2 pop hit for Leo Sayer in 1980. In addition, "How Much Does the World Weigh" was later recorded by Tracy Byrd on his 2001 album Ten Rounds. Maybe Not Tonight was also Kershaw's last studio album for Mercury. After it was released, Mercury issued an album of cover songs and a second greatest hits compilation before he exited the label.

== Track listing ==
No.	Title	Writer(s)	Length
1.	"Maybe Not Tonight" (duet with Lorrie Morgan)	Keith Stegall, Dan Hill	4:08
2.	"Me and Maxine"	Gordon Bradberry, Michael Lunn	3:46
3.	"Without Strings"	Steven Dale Jones	3:56
4.	"More Than I Can Say"	Jerry Allison, Sonny Curtis	4:23
5.	"Love Me, Loving You"	Sammy Kershaw, Gregg Wright, Mike Fornes, Gary McGuire	3:33
6.	"I've Never Gone This Far Before"	Carson Chamberlain, Gary Harrison, Stegall	3:26
7.	"When You Love Someone"	Stegall, Hill	4:13
8.	"Ouch"	Tom Shapiro, Al Anderson	3:33
9.	"How Can I Say No"	Kershaw	3:37
10.	"Look What I Did to Us"	Chamberlain, Harrison, Stegall	4:34
11.	"Louisiana Hot Sauce"	Kershaw, Stegall	4:04
12.	"How Much Does the World Weigh"	Lee Thomas Miller, Michael White	3:59

== Personnel ==
- Eddie Bayers – drums
- Stuart Duncan – fiddle
- Paul Franklin – steel guitar
- John Kelton – keyboards
- Sammy Kershaw – lead vocals
- Brent Mason – electric guitar
- Lorrie Morgan – vocals on "Maybe Not Tonight"
- Gary Prim – keyboards
- Hargus "Pig" Robbins – piano
- John Wesley Ryles – background vocals
- Keith Stegall – "wangy guitar"
- John D. Willis – acoustic guitar
- Glenn Worf – bass guitar

=== String section ===
- Bruce Dukov, Endre Granat, Bob Gerry, Alan Grunfeld, Clayton Haslop, Darius Campo, Gil Romero, Horia Moroaica, Joel Derouin, Karen Johnes, Mike Markman, Pat Johnson, Rachel Purkin, Razdan Kuyumjian, Sheldon Sanov, Tammy Hatwan – violins
- Harry Shirinian, Margot Aldcroft, Matt Funes, Carrie Holzman, Maria Newman, Simon Oswell, Ron Strauss, Ray Tischer – violas
- Steve Erody, Vage Ayrikyan, Jodi Burnett, Larry Corbett, Suzie Katayama, Armen Ksajikian, Miguel Martinez, Steve Richards – cellos

Strings conducted and arranged by Steve Dorff.

== Chart performance ==
=== Weekly charts ===
Chart (1999)	Peak position
US Billboard 200	99
US Top Country Albums (Billboard)	7

=== Year-end charts ===
Chart (1999)	Position
US Top Country Albums (Billboard)	70
