= Greater Need =

Studio album by Lorrie Morgan
- Released: June 4, 1996
- Genre: Country
- Label: BNA #66847
- Producer: James Stroud

Lorrie Morgan chronology
Reflections: Greatest Hits (1995)	Greater Need (1996)	Shakin' Things Up (1997)

Professional ratings
Review scores
Source	Rating
AllMusic	3/5 stars
Entertainment Weekly	B

Greater Need is the fifth studio album by American country music artist Lorrie Morgan, released in 1996. It included three singles, all of which entered the Billboard country singles charts: "By My Side" (a duet with then-husband Jon Randall), "I Just Might Be" and "Good as I Was to You."

Allmusic rated the album three stars out of five, with its review by Thom Owens saying that some tracks were "filler" but that "Morgan's performance is consistently stunning."

== Track listing ==
No.	Title	Writer(s)	Length
1.	"Soldier of Love"	David Malloy, Anthony Crawford, Richard "Spady" Brannan	2:35
2.	"I Just Might Be"	John Moffat	3:14
3.	"Greater Need"	Constant Change	4:00
4.	"Steppin' Stones" (featuring Vince Gill and Travis Tritt)	Kat Graham, J. Francis Keus	3:26
5.	"I Can Buy My Own Roses"	Skip Ewing, Victoria Shaw	3:13
6.	"Don't Stop in My World"	Ray Pennington	2:51
7.	"By My Side" (duet with Jon Randall)	Constant Change	2:54
8.	"Reading My Heart"	Paul Nelson, Gayla Borders, Jeff Borders	3:11
9.	"Good as I Was to You"	Don Schlitz, Billy Livsey	3:28
10.	"She Walked Beside the Wagon" (featuring Jesse Keith Whitley)	Lynn Gillespie Chater, Kerry Chater, Cyril Rawson	3:39
11.	"Back Among the Living"	Ewing, Donny Kees	3:57

== Personnel ==
As listed in liner notes.

- Eddie Bayers – drums
- Michael Black – background vocals
- Larry Byrom – acoustic guitar
- Glen Duncan – fiddle, mandolin
- Paul Franklin – steel guitar, Dobro
- Sonny Garrish – steel guitar, Dobro
- John Hobbs – piano
- Dann Huff – electric guitar
- David Hungate – bass guitar
- Jana King – background vocals
- Alison Krauss – background vocals
- Paul Leim – drums
- Terry McMillan – harmonica, percussion
- Matt Rollings – piano
- Joe Spivey – fiddle, mandolin
- Billy Joe Walker, Jr. – acoustic guitar
- Cindy Walker – background vocals
- Glenn Worf – bass guitar
- Curtis Young – background vocals

== Chart performance ==
=== Albums ===
Chart (1996)	Peak position
Canadian RPM Country Albums	9
U.S. Billboard 200	62
U.S. Billboard Top Country Albums	8

=== Singles ===
Year	Single	Peak chart positions		
Year	Single	US Country	US	CAN Country
1996	"By My Side"	18	110	21
1996	"I Just Might Be"	45	—	57
1997	"Good as I Was to You"	4	—	17
