= My Night to Howl =

Single by Lorrie Morgan

from the album My Night to Howl
- B-side: "Evening Up the Odds"
- Released: March 19, 1994
- Genre: Country
- Length: 3:51
- Label: BNA
- Songwriters: Charlie Black, Austin Roberts, Rick Giles
- Producer: Richard Landis

Lorrie Morgan singles chronology
"Crying Time" (1993)	"My Night to Howl" (1994)	"If You Came Back from Heaven" (1994)

"My Night to Howl" is a song recorded by American country music artist Lorrie Morgan. It was released in March 1994 as the first single from the album War Paint. The song reached number 31 on the Billboard Hot Country Singles & Tracks chart. The song was written by Charlie Black, Austin Roberts and Rick Giles.

== Critical reception ==
A review of the song in Billboard was favorable, stating that "Morgan unleashes her full feline fury against a driving beat, purring organ, and wahwah guitar. Another satisfying side from a singer who's on a roll." Richard McVey of Cashbox was less favorable, writing that it "has Morgan's great vocals, but that's all. The song says nothing new lyrically."

== Chart performance ==
Chart (1994)	Peak position
US Hot Country Songs (Billboard)	31
Canada Country Singles (RPM)	56
