= I Guess You Had to Be There =

Single by Lorrie Morgan

from the album Watch Me
- B-side: "Someone to Call Me Darling"
- Released: February 1993
- Genre: Country
- Length: 4:10
- Label: BNA
- Songwriters: Jon Robbin; Barbara Cloyd
- Producer: Richard Landis

Lorrie Morgan singles chronology
| "What Part of No" (1992) | "I Guess You Had to Be There" (1993) | "Half Enough" (1993) |

Official video
- "I Guess You Had to Be There" on YouTube

"I Guess You Had to Be There" is a song written by Jon Robbin and Barbara Cloyd, and recorded by American country music artist Lorrie Morgan. It was released in February 1993 as the third single from her album Watch Me (1992). The song reached number 14 on the Billboard Hot Country Singles & Tracks chart in July 1993.

== Chart performance ==
Chart performance for "I Guess You Had to Be There"
| Chart (1993) | Peak position |
|---|---|
| Canada Country Singles (RPM) | 14 |
| US Hot Country Songs (Billboard) | 14 |
