= Shakin' Things Up =

Studio album by Lorrie Morgan
- Released: August 12, 1997
- Genre: Country
- Length: 38:08
- Label: BNA
- Producer: Lorrie Morgan; James Stroud

Lorrie Morgan chronology
Greater Need (1996)	Shakin' Things Up (1997)	Secret Love (1998)

Professional ratings
Review scores
Source	Rating
AllMusic	4/5 stars

Shakin' Things Up is the sixth studio album by American country music artist Lorrie Morgan, released in 1997 via BNA Records.

Billboard charting singles included "Go Away" at #3, "One of Those Nights Tonight" at #14, "I'm Not That Easy to Forget" at #49, and "You'd Think He'd Know Me Better" at #66. The album was certified gold by the RIAA.

== Track listing ==
No.	Title	Writer(s)	Length
1.	"Shakin' Things Up"	Stephanie Jones, Shaye Smith	3:09
2.	"One of Those Nights Tonight"	Susan Longacre, Rick Giles	3:51
3.	"You Can't Take That"	Lisa Drew, Will Robinson	4:00
4.	"Go Away"	Stephony Smith, Cathy Majeski, Sunny Russ	2:50
5.	"Crazy from the Heat"	Wally Wilson, Sam Hogin, Jim McBride	3:41
6.	"I'm Not That Easy to Forget"	Chris Waters, George Teren, Stephanie Bentley	3:16
7.	"I've Enjoyed as Much of This as I Can Stand""	Bill Anderson	3:52
8.	"Finishing Touch"	Ken McGovern, Jody Harris	2:39
9.	"You'd Think He'd Know Me Better"	Bobbie Cryner	4:13
10.	"Will You Love Me Tomorrow?"	Gerry Goffin, Carole King	3:14
11.	"In a Perfect World"	Keith Stegall, Billy Kirsch	3:23

== Personnel ==
- Brittany Allyn - background vocals
- Sam Bush - mandolin
- Larry Byrom - acoustic guitar
- Scott Coney - background vocals
- John Cowan - background vocals
- John Deaderick - piano
- Steve Dorff - string arrangements, conductor
- Dan Dugmore - steel guitar
- Stuart Duncan - fiddle, mandolin
- Craig "Flash" Fletcher - mandolin, background vocals
- Larry Franklin - fiddle
- Paul Franklin - dobro, steel guitar
- Carl Gorodetzky - string contractor
- Vern Gosdin - background vocals
- Michael Landau - electric guitar
- Brent Mason - electric guitar
- Howard Mayberry - drums
- Lorrie Morgan - lead vocals
- Joshua Motohashi - acoustic guitar, steel guitar
- The Nashville String Machine - strings
- Steve Nathan - keyboards, piano
- Dave Pomeroy - bass guitar
- Jon Randall - background vocals
- Matt Rollings - piano
- Brent Rowan - electric guitar
- Joe Spivey - bass guitar, fiddle
- Kyle Tullis - bass guitar
- Jim Vest - steel guitar
- Lonnie Wilson - drums, percussion

== Chart performance ==
Chart (1997)	Peak position
U.S. Billboard Top Country Albums	9
U.S. Billboard 200	98
