= War Paint (Lorrie Morgan album) =

Studio album by Lorrie Morgan
- Released: May 10, 1994
- Genre: Country
- Label: BNA
- Producer: Richard Landis

Lorrie Morgan chronology
Merry Christmas from London (1993)	War Paint (1994)	Reflections: Greatest Hits (1995)

Singles from War Paint
- 1. "My Night to Howl" Released: March 19, 1994; 2. "If You Came Back from Heaven" Released: May 1994; 3. "Heart Over Mind" Released: August 1994

Professional ratings
Review scores
Source	Rating
Allmusic	2.5/5 stars
Chicago Tribune	3.5/4 stars
Entertainment Weekly	B

War Paint is the fourth studio album by American country music artist Lorrie Morgan. The album was released via BNA Records in 1994. It contains the singles "My Night to Howl," "If You Came Back from Heaven," and "Heart Over Mind." Also included are covers of George Jones' "A Good Year for the Roses", recorded here as a duet with Sammy Kershaw, and Jeannie Seely's "Don't Touch Me." The cassette version of the album omits the track "Exit 99."

Thom Owens of Allmusic rated the album two-and-a-half stars out of five, saying that "Morgan still sings beautifully, but her clean contemporary country arrangements are as predictable as her material. The three hit singles[…]hold up really well."

== Track listing ==
No.	Title	Writer(s)	Length
1.	"My Night to Howl"	Rick Giles, Austin Roberts, Charlie Black	3:51
2.	"War Paint"	Lorrie Morgan, Tom Shapiro	4:58
3.	"If You Came Back from Heaven"	Morgan, Richard Landis	3:38
4.	"Heart over Mind"	Stan Munsey, Bob Alan	3:48
5.	"1-800 Use to Be"	Craig Wiseman, David Duncan	3:02
6.	"A Good Year for the Roses" (duet with Sammy Kershaw)	Jerry Chesnut	3:28
7.	"The Hard Part Was Easy"	Gary Burr, Reed Nielsen	3:26
8.	"Don't Touch Me"	Hank Cochran	3:09
9.	"Exit 99"	Lindy Gravelle, Steve Blume	3:29
10.	"Evening Up the Odds"	Angela Kaset, Wendy Waldman	4:51

== Personnel ==
As listed in liner notes.

- Michael Black – background vocals
- Larry Byrom – acoustic guitar, electric guitar
- Glen Duncan – fiddle, mandolin
- Paul Franklin – steel guitar, Dobro
- Vicki Hampton – background vocals
- Dann Huff – electric guitar
- Mitch Humphries – keyboards
- Jana King – background vocals
- Alison Krauss – background vocals
- Paul Leim – drums
- Carl Marsh – keyboards
- Brent Mason – electric guitar
- Terry McMillan – harmonica, percussion
- Lorrie Morgan – vocals
- Steve Nathan – organ
- Cindy Richardson-Walker – background vocals
- Brent Rowan – acoustic guitar, electric guitar
- Lisa Silver – background vocals
- Pam Tillis – background vocals
- Billy Joe Walker Jr. – acoustic guitar
- Dennis Wilson – background vocals
- Glenn Worf – bass guitar, upright bass
- Curtis "Mr. Harmony" Young – background vocals

Strings performed by the Asa Drori Orchestra, arranged by Charles Calello. Horns arranged by Jerry Hey

== Chart performance ==
Chart (1994)	Peak position
U.S. Billboard Top Country Albums	7
U.S. Billboard 200	48
Canadian RPM Top Albums	52
