= Wayne Perry (songwriter) =

American singer-songwriter

Darrell Wayne Perry (1950 – May 15, 2005) was a country music singer and songwriter. Perry wrote five Number 1 country songs, before switching to pop music.

== Career ==
Perry started his music career in the Cincinnati, Ohio, area in the early 1970s, where he recorded several songs on the Beast Records label before moving to Nashville, Tennessee. His song credits include "Not a Moment Too Soon," recorded by Tim McGraw; "A Woman's Touch," recorded by Toby Keith in 1996; "I Only Miss You," featured in the 1996 movie The Evening Star; and "Every Promise I Ever Made," featured in the 2002 movie Desert Saints. He co-wrote "What Part of No," which was a number-one hit for Lorrie Morgan. Late in his career he added pop music to his repertoire, writing songs for performers such as the Backstreet Boys.

== Death ==
Wayne Perry died from throat cancer in 2005, at age 55. The cancer was diagnosed in December 2002. Perry's sister, evangelical preacher Darlene Bishop, persuaded him not to undergo recommended medical treatment, but instead to seek healing through prayer, which she said she had used to overcome breast cancer. Perry accepted her advice and moved from his home in Waverly, Tennessee (near Nashville), to live with his sister at her horse farm in Monroe, Ohio. Bishop wrote a book, Your Life Follows Your Words, that described herself and her brother's success in healing cancer through their Christian faith. Perry, however, was advised in 2004 that his cancer had become terminal, and died in Monroe the following year. Subsequently, his four children sued Bishop. In the lawsuits, they charged Bishop with wrongdoing in Perry's death, sought to remove her as executor of his estate, and sought ownership of the rights to Perry's music, including many unrecorded songs. Bishop said that the allegations against her were false. However, in a deposition in the case, she revealed that she had never been medically diagnosed with breast cancer; she said she thought she had the disease and later was cured. The wrongful death lawsuit was later dropped. The litigation over Perry's estate was settled in 2010, placing Perry's music in trust for his children.

== Legal battle ==
The legal battle over Perry's estate was the subject of a 2011 episode of the Investigation Discovery television series The Will: Family Secrets Revealed, entitled "The Estate of Wayne Perry."
