= My Heart (Lorrie Morgan album) =

Studio album by Lorrie Morgan
- Released: April 13, 1999
- Genre: Country
- Label: BNA
- Producer: Csaba Petocz "Maybe Not Tonight" produced by Keith Stegall

Lorrie Morgan chronology
Secret Love (1998)	My Heart (1999)	To Get to You: Greatest Hits Collection (2000)

Professional ratings
Review scores
Source	Rating
AllMusic	3/5 stars
Robert Christgau	(choice cut)

My Heart is a studio album by the country music artist Lorrie Morgan, released in 1999. It contains two chart singles: "Here I Go Again" (#72) and "Maybe Not Tonight", a duet with Sammy Kershaw (#17). The latter song was also included on Kershaw's 1999 album Maybe Not Tonight. The track "The Only Thing That Looks Good on Me Is You" is a cover of a Bryan Adams song.

== Track listing ==
1. "The Things We Do" (Brett Jones) – 3:53
  - duet with Jo Dee Messina
2. "Where Does That Leave Me?" (Robert Ellis Orrall, Cathy Majeski) – 3:25
3. "I Did" (Michelle McAfee, Richard Leigh) – 3:49
4. "Strong Enough to Cry" (Max D. Barnes, Rory Lee Feek) – 4:19
5. "Maybe Not Tonight" (Keith Stegall, Dan Hill) – 4:09
  - duet with Sammy Kershaw
6. "Here I Go Again" (Kim Richey) – 2:56
7. "Between Midnight and Tomorrow" (Leslie Satcher) – 3:54
8. "The Only Thing That Looks Good on Me Is You" (Robert John "Mutt" Lange, Bryan Adams) – 3:50
9. "Never Been Good at Letting Go" (Trey Bruce) – 4:34
10. "My Heart" (Satcher) – 2:19
11. "On This Bed" (Jon Randall) – 3:57

== Personnel ==
- Brittany Allyn - background vocals
- Eddie Bayers - drums
- Mike Brignardello - bass guitar
- Sam Bush - mandolin
- Larry Byrom - acoustic guitar
- Vinnie Colaiuta - drums
- Stuart Duncan - fiddle
- Tabitha Fair - background vocals
- Larry Franklin - fiddle
- Paul Franklin - pedal steel guitar
- John Hobbs - organ, piano, synthesizer, Wurlitzer
- Dann Huff - electric guitar
- Carl Jackson - background vocals
- Sammy Kershaw - duet vocals on "Maybe Not Tonight"
- Brent Mason - electric guitar
- Jo Dee Messina - duet vocals on "The Things We Do"
- Lorrie Morgan - lead vocals
- Gary Prim - keyboards
- Brent Rowan - electric guitar
- John Wesley Ryles - background vocals
- Leslie Satcher - background vocals
- John Willis - acoustic guitar
- Glenn Worf - bass guitar

== Chart performance ==
Chart (1999)	Peak position
U.S. Billboard Top Country Albums	8
U.S. Billboard 200	116
