= A Moment in Time (album) =

Studio album by Lorrie Morgan
- Released: October 27, 2009
- Recorded: 2008–2009
- Genre: Country
- Length: 43:32
- Label: Stroudavarious/Country Crossing
- Producer: Chip Voorhis; Wally Wilson

Lorrie Morgan chronology
Show Me How (2004)	A Moment in Time (2009)	Dos Divas (2013)

Singles from A Moment in Time
- 1. "Leavin' on Your Mind" Released: November 2009

Professional ratings
Review scores
Source	Rating
Allmusic	4.5/5 stars

A Moment in Time is the tenth studio album by American country music artist Lorrie Morgan. The album was released on October 27, 2009 via Stroudavarious. It is a covers album, featuring a total of 14 traditional country classics.

== Content ==
After signing to the newly formed Stroudavarious Records in 2008, Morgan began work on her first studio album since 2004's Show Me How. An album titled I Walk Alone was available through Morgan's fan club and at concerts, but its release to the public was delayed. Instead, A Moment in Time, which consists of traditional country songs, was released on October 27, 2009. The album features fourteen covers, including Mel Street's "Borrowed Angel," Glen Campbell's "By the Time I Get to Phoenix," and Freddie Hart's Number One hit "Easy Loving." Two songs on the album are duets, with Tracy Lawrence ("After the Fire Is Gone") and Raul Malo ("Easy Lovin'").

== Promotion ==
In promotion for the album, Morgan made appearances on CMT and GAC throughout October. She appeared on Daytime on October 29, 2009, and she also appeared on The Daily Buzz on November 3, 2009. She also appeared as a celebrity guest judge on an episode of Iron Chef America. In 2010, Morgan played the role of "Lula" in the Broadway adaptation of Pure Country, the 1992 film starring George Strait.

== Track listing ==
No.	Title	Writer(s)	Original artist(s)	Length
1.	"Cry"	Churchill Kohlman	Johnnie Ray	3:53
2.	"Are You Lonesome Tonight?"	Lou Handman; Roy Turk	Charles Hart	3:17
3.	"After the Fire Is Gone" (featuring Tracy Lawrence)	L. E. White	Loretta Lynn and Conway Twitty	2:41
4.	"Leavin' on Your Mind"	Webb Pierce; Wayne Walker	Joyce Smith	3:29
5.	"Borrowed Angel"	Mel Street	Mel Street	3:18
6.	"Break It to Me Gently"	Diane Charlotte Lampert; Joe Seneca	Brenda Lee	2:39
7.	"By the Time I Get to Phoenix"	Jimmy Webb	Johnny Rivers	3:04
8.	"Easy Lovin'" (featuring Raul Malo)	Freddie Hart	Freddie Hart	2:45
9.	"'Til I Get It Right"	Larry Henley; Red Lane	Tammy Wynette	3:33
10.	"Alright I'll Sign the Papers"	Mel Tillis	George Morgan	2:48
11.	"I'm Always on a Mountain When I Fall"	Chuck Howard	Merle Haggard	2:53
12.	"Misty Blue"	Bob Montgomery	Wilma Burgess	3:30
13.	"Wine Me Up"	Billy Deaton; Faron Young	Faron Young	2:41
14.	"Lovin' on Backstreets"	Hugh King	Mel Street	3:01
Total length:				43:32

== Personnel ==
- Brittany Allyn – backing vocals
- David Angell – violin
- Monisa Angell – viola
- Maggie Barry – design
- Eddie Bayers – drums
- Niko Bolas – engineer, mixing
- Harold Bradley – tic tac bass, archtop guitar
- Jimmy Capps – acoustic guitar
- Kirsten Cassell – cello
- Mike Casteel – copyist
- Sarah Choi – cello
- David Davidson – violin
- Richard Dodd – mastering
- Connie Ellisor – violin
- Chris Farrell – viola
- Larry Franklin – fiddle
- Paul Franklin – pedal steel guitar
- Carl Gorodetzky – violin
- Kenny Greenberg – electric guitar
- Jim Grosjean – viola
- Allison Hardy – production coordination
- Russ Harrington – photography
- Wes Hightower – backing vocals
- Joe Martino – engineer
- Lorrie Morgan – lead vocals, liner notes
- Gordon Mote – piano
- Cate Myer – violin
- Louis Dean Nunley – backing vocals
- Carole Rabinowitz-Neuen – cello
- Eberhard Ramm – copyist
- John Wesley Ryles – backing vocals
- Pamela Sixfin – violin
- Joe Spivey – acoustic guitar, fiddle
- Julia Tanner – cello
- Russell Terrell – backing vocals
- Ben Terry – Engineer
- Alan Umstead – violin
- Catherine Umstead – violin
- Gary Van Osdale – viola
- Mary Kathryn Van Osdale – violin
- Chip Voorhis – producer, engineer
- Katie Voorhis – production coordination
- Billy Joe Walker, Jr. – acoustic guitar
- Bergen White – composer, backing vocals, vocal arrangement, string arrangements
- Wally Wilson – producer
- Karen Winkelman – violin
- Glenn Worf – upright bass

== Chart performance ==
A Moment in Time debuted at #50 on the U.S. Billboard Top Country Albums chart. It peaked at #40.

Chart (2009)	Peak position
U.S. Billboard Top Country Albums	40
