= Maybe Not Tonight (song) =

Single by Sammy Kershaw with Lorrie Morgan

from the album Maybe Not Tonight
- B-side: "Go Away" (Lorrie Morgan)
- Released: February 27, 1999
- Genre: Country
- Length: 4:08
- Label: BNA/Mercury Nashville
- Songwriters: Keith Stegall, Dan Hill
- Producer: Keith Stegall

Sammy Kershaw singles chronology
| "One Day Left to Live" (1999) | "Maybe Not Tonight" (1999) | "When You Love Someone" (1999) |

Lorrie Morgan singles chronology
| "You Think He'd Know Me Better" (1998) | "Maybe Not Tonight" (1999) | "Here I Go Again" (1999) |

"Maybe Not Tonight" is a song written by Keith Stegall and Dan Hill, and recorded by American country music artists Sammy Kershaw and Lorrie Morgan. It was released in February 1999 as the first single and title track from Kershaw's album Maybe Not Tonight. The song reached #17 on the Billboard Hot Country Singles & Tracks chart. It was the final top 20 hit for both Morgan and Kershaw.

== Chart performance ==
| Chart (1999) | Peak position |
|---|---|
| Canada Country Singles (RPM) | 24 |
| US Billboard Hot 100 | 86 |
| US Hot Country Songs (Billboard) | 17 |
