= One of Those Nights Tonight =

Single by Lorrie Morgan

from the album Shakin' Things Up
- B-side: "By My Side"
- Released: October 1997
- Genre: Country
- Length: 3:51
- Label: BNA
- Songwriters: Susan Longacre; Rick Giles
- Producers: Lorrie Morgan; James Stroud

Lorrie Morgan singles chronology
"Go Away" (1997)	"One of Those Nights Tonight" (1997)	"I'm Not That Easy to Forget" (1998)

"One of Those Nights Tonight" is a song written by Susan Longacre and Rick Giles, and recorded by American country music artist Lorrie Morgan. It was released in October 1997 as the second single from her album Shakin' Things Up. The song reached number 14 on the Billboard Hot Country Singles & Tracks chart in February 1998.

== Chart performance ==
Chart (1997–1998)	Peak position
Canada Country Singles (RPM)	12
US Hot Country Songs (Billboard)	14
