= Watch Me (Lorrie Morgan song) =

Single by Lorrie Morgan

from the album Watch Me
- B-side: "She's Taking Him Back Again"
- Released: September 5, 1992
- Genre: Country
- Length: 3:37
- Label: BNA
- Songwriters: Tom Shapiro; Gary Burr
- Producer: Richard Landis

Lorrie Morgan singles chronology
"Something in Red" (1992)	"Watch Me" (1992)	"What Part of No" (1992)

"Watch Me" is a song written by Tom Shapiro and Gary Burr, and recorded by American country music artist Lorrie Morgan. It was released in July 1992 as the first single and title track from her album Watch Me. The song reached #2 on the Billboard Hot Country Singles & Tracks chart in November 1992.

== Music video ==
A music video was released in late 1992 and features Top Gun actor Rick Rossovich. Directed by Sherman Halsey, it features Morgan performing the song in a dance studio, as well as while seated on a high window sill in an apartment. Her boyfriend, a truck tower, is trying all he can to please her, but she has had enough of him lazing around the house and his garage (where she also works) and, after finding him slumped in his truck, dumps him as he tries to get into her car. She then decides to go out with her girls for a night out, but the car breaks down. While at a café, she notices her estranged boyfriend towing her car to the cafe, and he hands her a bouquet of flowers. The couple then embrace, ending the video.

== Chart performance ==
Chart (1992)	Peak position
Canada Country Singles (RPM)	4
US Hot Country Songs (Billboard)	2

=== Year-end charts ===
Chart (1992)	Position
Canada Country Tracks (RPM)	74
