= By My Side (film) =

- By My Side
- Directed by: Reuben Kang
- Produced by: Jin Lim
- Starring: Marianne Tan, Brandon Ho, Arwind Kumar
- Production company: JinnyboyTV
- Release date: 16 September 2017 (TGV Cinemas Malaysia)
- Running time: 75 minutes
- Country: Malaysia
- Language: English

By My Side is a 75-minute featured film produced by Jin Lim and directed by Reuben Kang, the faces of JinnyboyTV. The movie is a coming-of-age tale of Faye (Marianne Tan, also starred in Ola Bola) who is about to venture into a new phase in life, supposedly attending the same college with her first love, Ben (Brandon Ho), only to discover his plan to pursue his studies overseas.

With the help of Malaysian video portal Tonton, the movie took four months to complete.

The film premiered on 15 September 2017 in TGV Cinemas, 1 Utama.
