= What Part of No =

Single by Lorrie Morgan

from the album Watch Me
- B-side: "You Leave Me Like This"
- Released: December 7, 1992
- Genre: Country
- Length: 2:45
- Label: BNA
- Songwriters: Wayne Perry, Gerald Smith
- Producer: Richard Landis

Lorrie Morgan singles chronology
"Watch Me" (1992)	"What Part of No" (1992)	"I Guess You Had to Be There" (1993)

"What Part of No" is a song written by Wayne Perry and Gerald Smith, and recorded by American country music artist Lorrie Morgan. It was released in December 1992 as the second single from her album Watch Me. The song reached Number One on the U.S. Billboard Hot Country Singles & Tracks charts dated for the week of February 27, 1993, holding the Number One position for three weeks. To date, it is Morgan's biggest hit.

She performed the song on the live telecast of the 11th annual Music City News Country Songwriters Awards.

== Content ==
A woman in a social setting is approached repeatedly by a persistent man who sends her a rose, then buys her a drink and asks her to dance. The woman, uninterested in the man despite his advances, finally asks "What part of 'no' don't you understand?"

== Chart positions ==
Chart (1992–1993)	Peak position
Canada Country Singles (RPM)	1
US Hot Country Songs (Billboard)	1

=== Year-end charts ===
Chart (1993)	Position
Canada Country Tracks (RPM)	37
US Country Songs (Billboard)	28
