= Lorrie Morgan =

American musician (born 1959)

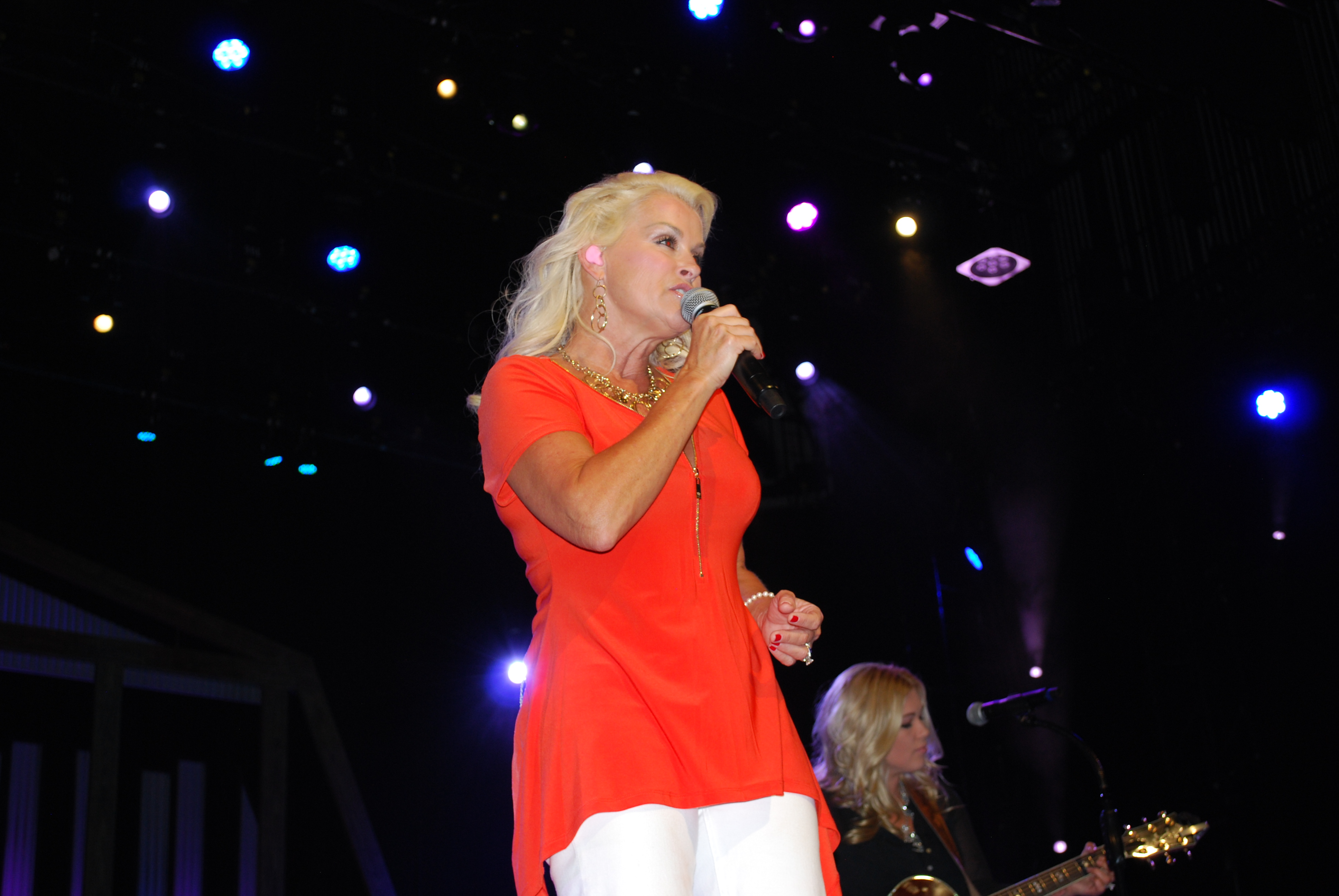
- Morgan at the Grand Ole Opry in 2015
- Born: Loretta Lynn Morgan; June 27, 1959 (age 67); Nashville, Tennessee, U.S.
- Occupations: Musician; singer; actress
- Years active: 1972–present
- Spouses: Ron Gaddis (m. 1979; div. 1981) Keith Whitley (m. 1986; died 1989) Brad Thompson (m. 1991; div. 1993) Jon Randall (m. 1996; div. 1999) Sammy Kershaw (m. 2001; div. 2007) Randy White (m. 2010; died 2025)
- Children: 2
- Father: George Morgan
- Musical career
- Genre: Country
- Instruments: Vocals; guitar
- Labels: Hickory; MCA; RCA; BNA; RLJ Entertainment; Country Crossing; Stroudavarious
- Website: lorrie.com

Loretta Lynn Morgan (born June 27, 1959) is an American country music singer and actress. She is the daughter of George Morgan, widow of Keith Whitley, and ex-wife of Jon Randall and Sammy Kershaw, all of whom are also country music singers. Morgan has been active as a singer since the age of 13, and charted her first single in 1979. She achieved her greatest success between 1988 and 1999, recording for RCA Records and the defunct BNA Records. Her first two RCA albums (Leave the Light On and Something in Red) and her BNA album Watch Me are all certified platinum by the Recording Industry Association of America (RIAA). The 1995 compilation Reflections: Greatest Hits is her best-selling album with a double-platinum certification; War Paint, Greater Need, and Shakin' Things Up, also on BNA, are certified gold.

Morgan has made more than 40 chart entries on the Billboard Hot Country Songs charts, including three number-one singles: "Five Minutes", "What Part of No", and "I Didn't Know My Own Strength", and 11 additional top-10 hits. Morgan has recorded in collaboration with her father, as well as Whitley, Randall, Kershaw, Frank Sinatra, Johnny Mathis, Tammy Wynette, The Beach Boys, Dolly Parton, Andy Williams, the New World Philharmonic, and Pam Tillis. She is also a member of the Grand Ole Opry. Morgan's musical style is defined largely by country pop influences and her dramatic singing voice, with frequent stylistic comparisons to Tammy Wynette.

== Early life ==
Loretta Lynn Morgan was born in Nashville, Tennessee, on June 27, 1959. She is the fifth child of country music singer George Morgan. Morgan was not named after the late Loretta Lynn. Lynn was not a nationally known performer in 1959. At age 13, Lorrie Morgan made her first performance on the Grand Ole Opry, when her father brought her onstage to perform "Paper Roses". According to Morgan herself, the performance received a standing ovation. Morgan's father died in 1975, so she and the members of his band toured various small clubs until 1977, when they disbanded and she began touring with Roy Wiggins. After this, she worked as a receptionist, songwriter, and demo singer for Acuff-Rose Music.

== Recording career ==
Morgan's employment at Acuff-Rose led to her signing with that company's Hickory Records label, which issued two singles in 1979: "Two People in Love" and "Tell Me I'm Only Dreaming," written by Eddy Raven and Liz Anderson, respectively. Both singles made the lower regions of the Hot Country Songs charts that year. Another single, "I'm Completely Satisfied with You", featured electronically overdubbed vocals of her father. It also made the charts by year's end. During the early 1980s, Morgan continued to tour primarily in night clubs, and served as an opening act for Billy ThunderKloud & the Chieftones, Jeannie Seely, and Jack Greene, among others. She also toured as a backing vocalist for George Jones, made guest appearances on the television series Nashville Now, and in 1984 became the youngest inductee of the Grand Ole Opry. The same year she issued three singles on MCA Records. First was a cover of The Supremes's "Someday We'll Be Together", followed by "Don't Go Changing" and "If You Came Back Tonight". Of these, only "Don't Go Changing" charted.

=== 1989–1991: RCA Records ===
Morgan signed to RCA Records Nashville in 1988 and released her first single for that label, "Trainwreck of Emotion", that year. The song reached number 20 on the Hot Country Songs chart and served as the lead single to her debut album Leave the Light On. Following this were "Dear Me" and "Out of Your Shoes"; these both went top ten on Hot Country Songs, with the latter also reaching the number-one position on the Radio & Records country charts in December 1989. After this song came "Five Minutes", her first number one on Hot Country Songs, and then another top ten in "He Talks to Me". Barry Beckett was the album's producer, and contributing songwriters included Mike Reid, Jon Vezner, and Beth Nielsen Chapman. Following the album's last single, RCA also issued "'Til a Tear Becomes a Rose", a duet between Morgan and Keith Whitley from the latter's Greatest Hits album. The song would later win Vocal Event of the Year from the Country Music Association. Thom Owens of AllMusic reviewed Leave the Light On favorably, calling it "a skilled and assured blend of traditional country, honky tonk, country-rock and modern pop sensibilities that pointed the direction toward the sound, style and musical eclecticism of '90s contemporary country." The Chicago Tribune writer Jack Hurst rated the album four out of four stars, referring to it as "fine, well-produced songs and a compelling performer". In 1993, Leave the Light On earned a platinum certification from the Recording Industry Association of America (RIAA) for shipments of one million copies.

Her second RCA album Something in Red came out in 1991. Also certified platinum by the RIAA, it accounted for four Hot Country Songs entries between then and early 1992: "We Both Walk", a cover of George Jones' "A Picture of Me (Without You)", and "Except for Monday" all reached top ten, while title track reached number fourteen in early 1992. The album also included a duet with Dolly Parton titled "Best Woman Wins", which also appeared on the latter's 1992 album Eagle When She Flies. Richard Landis produced the album except for the duet, which Parton produced with Steve Buckingham and Gary Smith. Contributing songwriters included Skip Ewing, Reed Nielsen, and Chris Waters. Brian Mansfield of AllMusic reviewed Something in Red favorably, noting that it had fewer "sad songs" than its predecessor while highlighting the "laidback country and ballads like the title track".

=== 1990s: BNA Records ===
Morgan moved to BNA Entertainment (later known as BNA Records) in 1992. According to Morgan, she chose to move to a different label and hire a new manager because her relationship with RCA personnel had become "stale". This resulted in her then-manager, Jack McFadden, suing her for $2,000,000 for early termination of contract, and she had to undergo pre-bankruptcy reorganization to counter the fees of the lawsuit. Her first BNA album, Watch Me, came out that same year. The title track was the first single, achieving a peak of number two on Hot Country Songs. The followup "What Part of No" became her second number-one single on that chart in early 1993; it was also her longest-reigning, holding that position for three weeks. After this came "I Guess You Had to Be There" and "Half Enough". The album featured backing vocals from Dale Daniel and The Remingtons, two other acts recording for BNA at the time; Richard Mainegra and Rick Yancey of the latter group also wrote the closing track "She's Takin' Him Back Again". As with the previous album, Landis again served as producer. Mansfield praised the album as being superior to its predecessors, but criticized "What Part of No" and Morgan's cover of Bonnie Tyler's "It's a Heartache". Alanna Nash of Entertainment Weekly rated the album "B", stating that "Morgan is a take-charge singer with more than a little vulnerability beneath her steely surface as well as an ability to adopt pop stylings without straining her country credibility." Watch Me became her third consecutive platinum album by the end of 1993.

Morgan released her first Christmas album, Merry Christmas from London, at the end of 1993. The album featured orchestral accompaniment from the New World Philharmonic orchestra, and duets with Tammy Wynette (a medley titled "A Christmas Festival"), Andy Williams ("Little Snow Girl"), and Johnny Mathis ("Blue Snowfall"). Roch Parisien of AllMusic panned the album for lacking in country sound. The album charted two seasonal entries on Hot Country Songs: a rendition of "My Favorite Things" in late 1993, and of "Sleigh Ride" two years later. Morgan sang "Little Snow Girl" with Williams as part of a Christmas special hosted at his Moon River Theater in Branson, Missouri which also aired on the television network PBS, and said that she chose to perform with him because she had been a fan of his music since childhood. A year after the album's release, Morgan began a special holiday tour which featured her performing songs from the album with orchestral backing. She also made her acting debut in this timespan, starting with the 1993 made-for-TV movie Proudheart on the defunct TNN (The Nashville Network). It featured her in the starring role as an assembly-line worker who moves back to a small town in Tennessee after the death of her father. In 1994, she portrayed the lead role in a television pilot for CBS called Lorelei Lee. The show focused on a country music-singing detective, but the pilot was not picked up for series. The following year, she appeared in the ABC TV movie The Stranger Beside Me.

BNA issued her next studio album, War Paint, in 1994. The album's singles were unsuccessful on the charts, with "My Night to Howl" peaking at number 31 on Hot Country Songs, "If You Came Back from Heaven" failing to reach top 40, and "Heart Over Mind" stopping at number 39. Despite this, the album was certified gold by the RIAA for shipments of 500,000 copies. War Paint also accounted for Morgan's first writing credits on one of her own albums in the title track and "If You Came Back from Heaven", the latter of which she wrote as a tribute to Whitley. Also included were two cover songs: Jeannie Seely's "Don't Touch Me" and George Jones' "A Good Year for the Roses", which she recorded as a duet with Sammy Kershaw. Thom Owens of AllMusic wrote of the album that the singles "hold up really well, but the rest of the album is a little too familiar for comfort." Nash noted Morgan's ability to sing songs with "intimacy" and "attitude", but criticized the "Native American stereotypes" of the title track. By year's end, Morgan had also begun touring as a headlining artist for the first time.

In 1995, Morgan released her first Greatest Hits album. It included most of her major hit singles to that point, along with three new tracks which were all issued as singles: "I Didn't Know My Own Strength" became her third and final number-one hit that year, followed by the top-five "Back in Your Arms Again", but a cover of Billie Jo Spears' "Standing Tall" was less successful on the charts. Greatest Hits also became her highest-certified album by the RIAA, reaching double-platinum status for shipments of two million copies.

=== Late 1990s ===
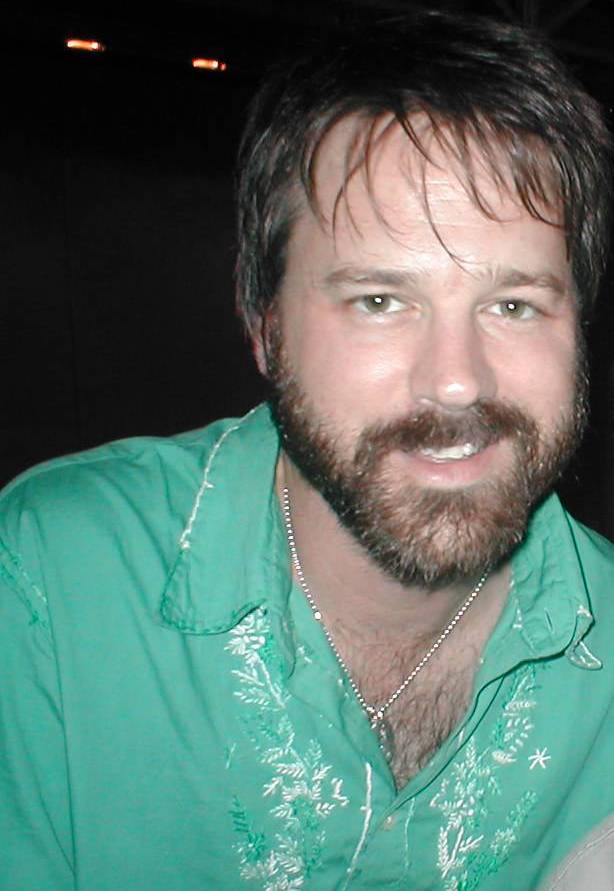
Jon Randall sang duet vocals on Morgan's 1996 single "By My Side"'; the two were also married from 1996 to 1999.

Morgan's next album Greater Need was released in 1996. Leading off the singles was the Jon Randall duet "By My Side", which became Randall's only top 40 hit. The song was originally intended to be a duet with Kershaw, but after his label expressed disinterest, the then-president of Morgan's label suggested that she cut it with Randall. While the followup single "I Just Might Be" failed to make top 40 on Hot Country Songs, the album's last single "Good as I Was to You" reached number four in 1997. Morgan said that she wanted the album to show her "maturing musically" over her previous works. She noted that she had originally declined the album's title track until she was encouraged by Thom Schuyler, a singer-songwriter who was also the president of artists and repertoire (A&R) at her label at the time, at which point she realized the song was indicative of the musical themes she wanted to pursue on the album. The album included guest vocals from Vince Gill, Travis Tritt, and her son Jesse Keith Whitley. James Stroud produced the album, and contributing musicians included Dann Huff, Paul Franklin, Billy Joe Walker Jr., Glenn Worf, Alison Krauss, and former Toto member David Hungate. Thom Owens of AllMusic, Alanna Nash of Entertainment Weekly, and Jeffrey B. Remz of Country Standard Time all praised the album for its varied sounds, with particular emphasis on its ballads.

She also released Shakin' Things Up in 1997. It featured the top-ten hit "Go Away" and the top-20 single "One of Those Nights Tonight", but the following singles "I'm Not That Easy to Forget" and a cover of Bobbie Cryner's "You Think He'd Know Me Better" both failed to make top 40. Also included on the album was a cover of The Shirelles' "Will You Love Me Tomorrow". Morgan held her first co-production credit on the album, doing so with Stroud; backing vocalists on the album included John Cowan, Vern Gosdin, and Randall. Tom Roland of The Tennessean considered the album her strongest since Something in Red, saying that it "combines a commanding, upbeat attitude with a few moments of subtle disturbance. And does so flawlessly." Remz highlighted the vocal performance on the Shirelles cover and the single "One of Those Nights Tonight" in particular, while calling the Bill Anderson composition "I've Enjoyed as Much of This as I Can Stand" the strongest song. Shakin' Things Up also earned a gold certification. Another album, Secret Love, followed in 1998. This album was composed entirely of cover songs dating largely from the 1940s and 1950s, and produced no singles. Morgan dedicated the album to her father, whom she claims introduced her to such music. Among the songs covered were "Fly Me to the Moon", "I've Got the World on a String", and "Good Morning Heartache". For this album, Landis returned to production duties, while musical accompaniment was largely handled by pianist Beegie Adair and the Nashville String Machine, a session string ensemble. Morgan performed ten concerts in 1998 which promoted the album, with Adair and a small orchestra accompanying her. Charlotte Dillon of AllMusic wrote that "her voice and emotional delivery are up to the test, even for old ballads and standards", while Nash found her delivery "overly dramatic".

Her last BNA studio album was My Heart in 1999. The only successful single from the album was the Sammy Kershaw duet "Maybe Not Tonight", which was concurrently issued on Kershaw's 1999 album of the same name, and simultaneously promoted by both BNA and Mercury Nashville, the label to which Kershaw was signed at the time. Audio engineer Csaba Petocz produced the album, except for the Kershaw duet, which was handled by Keith Stegall. Also included on the album was a cover of Bryan Adams' "The Only Thing That Looks Good on Me Is You", and the Jo Dee Messina duet "The Things We Do". Contributing songwriters included Robert Ellis Orrall, Leslie Satcher, Trey Bruce, Stegall, and Randall. Tom Roland of The Tennessean found the album's first half stronger than its second half, praising the collaborative songs and Morgan's vocal delivery on "Strong Enough to Cry", but criticizing the Adams cover. Tom Netherland of Country Standard Time was largely negative toward the album as a whole, criticizing the "too-slick production" and the lyrics on the ballads in particular. BNA issued a second compilation, To Get to You: Greatest Hits Collection, in 2000. Included on the album, in addition to several more of her hit singles, were covers of Sarah McLachlan's "Angel" and Tammy Wynette's "Another Lonely Song". Morgan then ended her contract with BNA at the time of the album's release, with The Tennessean columnist Brad Schmitt noting at the time that the departure from her label was amicable, and was likely spurred by declining sales and creative differences.

=== 2000s and 2010s ===
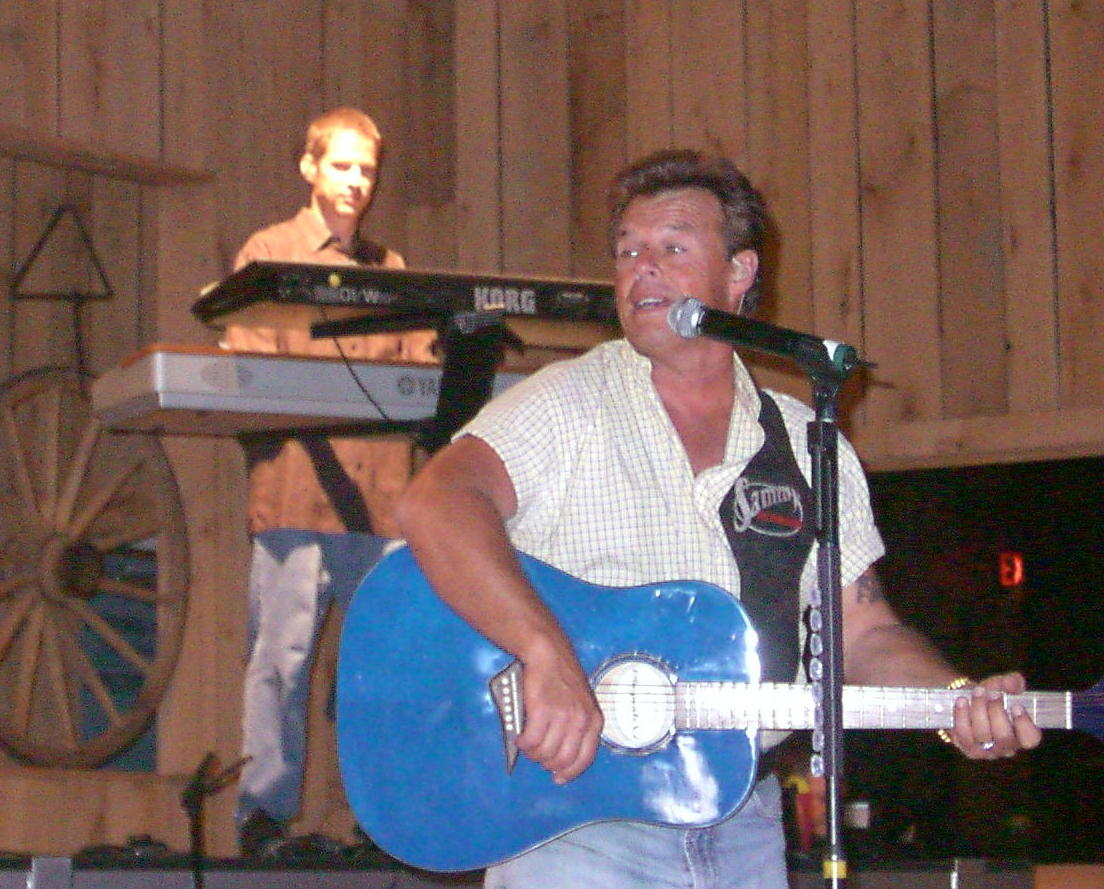
Morgan collaborated with Sammy Kershaw on the 1999 single "Maybe Not Tonight" and the duets album I Finally Found Someone; the two were also married from 2001 to 2007.

In 2001, RCA Nashville (of which BNA was a division at the time) signed both Morgan and Kershaw, who had just ended his tenure with Mercury, to a one-album deal. This deal included the collaborative album I Finally Found Someone, featuring six duets and three solo songs from each artist. Morgan's manager noted at the time that RCA's decision to re-sign her after having previously dropped her from the BNA division was "unusual". The album's title track was originally recorded by Barbra Streisand and Bryan Adams for the former's 1996 movie The Mirror Has Two Faces, and Morgan said that she had wanted to record the song after having seen the movie. One single, the duet "He Drinks Tequila", became Morgan's last top 40 entry on Hot Country Songs that year. Maria Konicki Dinoia of AllMusic showed favor toward the contrast in the two singers' voices, highlighting the more uptempo songs such as "He Drinks Tequila" in particular. Nash was less positive, calling the album "oddly reminiscent of the worst of '80s radio."

Morgan signed to Image Entertainment in 2002. Her first project for the label was The Color of Roses, a two-disc compilation featuring live performances of both her hit singles and pop standards accompanied by the Belmont University School of Music Orchestra, recorded on September 1, 2001 at the Tennessee Performing Arts Center in Nashville. The second disc included two studio recordings (the title track and a rendition of Sammi Smith's "Help Me Make It Through the Night") and a 43-minute interview. Charles Calello and Sandy Linzer produced the project, which was also issued on DVD and VHS. Image also released the studio album Show Me How in 2004. It accounted for her last chart entry, "Do You Still Want to Buy Me That Drink (Frank)", which peaked at number 50 on Hot Country Songs. Show Me How reunited her with Landis on production duties. James Manheim of AllMusic described her vocals as "better than ever", while also praising Landis's production and the lyrics.

Morgan's eleventh album A Moment in Time was released on October 27, 2009, on the Stroudavarious label. It features fourteen covers of traditional country songs, and duets with Tracy Lawrence and The Mavericks' lead singer Raul Malo. Thom Jurek of AllMusic praised the album's production and song choices, writing that "she is jaw-droppingly sincere, and her interpretations of these songs make them her own because of their originality, without sacrificing reverence for the standard versions. " In 2010, Morgan released another studio album called I Walk Alone. It included twelve songs that she co-wrote and co-produced, and she described it as occupying "a particularly introspective and vulnerable place in her life". This was followed in 2014 by Dos Divas, a collaboration album with Pam Tillis. Morgan released a further solo album in 2016, Letting Go...Slow, and a second duets album with Tillis in 2017, Come See Me and Come Lonely. In addition to these albums, Morgan has continued to tour and perform on the Grand Ole Opry in the 2010s. Her next studio album was released by the Cleopatra label in 2024 titled Dead Girl Walking.

== Musical style and influences ==
Morgan's style is defined by her singing voice, and the combination of ballads and uptempo material present in her discography. Robert K. Oermann of The Tennessean described her as "the blonde with the torchy delivery", and Alanna Nash called her voice a "throaty sob". Remz wrote in a review of Greater Need that "Morgan's voice always has been her strength, often getting right at the heart of songs of heartbreak and loss, her signature", while saying in a review of To Get to You that she "turn[s] in readings with a good deal of emotion tossed in without being overwrought. Sometimes the singing is almost too perfect, sacrificing intensity in the process." Nash contrasted her with Tammy Wynette, writing of her first greatest-hits album that it was "a reminder that Morgan is capable of delivering the kind of feisty songwriting that harkens back to Wynette’s halcyon days in the '70s." Morgan also felt that the comparisons to Wynette in her singing style and song choices were helpful in making her music appeal to female fans. Nash has also described Morgan as "plainspoken", referring to "What Part of No" as a song that "showcases her pull-no-punches style." Writing for The Times of Northwest Indiana, Jim Patterson stated that "Like Wynette, Morgan is tough but vulnerable, scarred by tragedy and dogged by the tabloids. And like Wynette, she can make it all come pouring out in her voice." James Manheim of AllMusic said of her songs' themes that they displayed a "sense of humor and play to her usual strengths in the genres of the breakup ballad and everywoman barroom encounter song."

== Other contributions ==
Morgan has contributed to a number of collaborative works. In 1993, she recorded a rendition of Buck Owens' "Crying Time" for the soundtrack of the film The Beverly Hillbillies, and charted for six weeks on Hot Country Songs with this rendition. She contributed to three multi-artist albums in 1994. First was the Eagles tribute album Common Thread: The Songs of the Eagles, which featured her covering that band's 1979 song "The Sad Café". The second was Frank Sinatra's Duets II, on which she sang a medley of James Ingram and Patti Austin's "How Do You Keep the Music Playing?" and Sinatra's "My Funny Valentine". Lastly, she contributed to Keith Whitley: A Tribute Album, which dubbed her voice with Whitley's on the duet "I Just Want You". The Beach Boys' 1996 album Stars and Stripes Vol. 1, a collaborative album with several country music artists, featured her on a rendition of "Don't Worry Baby". Also in 1996, she was one of many artists to contribute to "Hope: Country Music's Quest for a Cure", a multi-artist charity single sponsored by the T. J. Martell Foundation to promote leukemia research. This song charted on Hot Country Songs for four weeks in mid-1996.

== Personal life ==
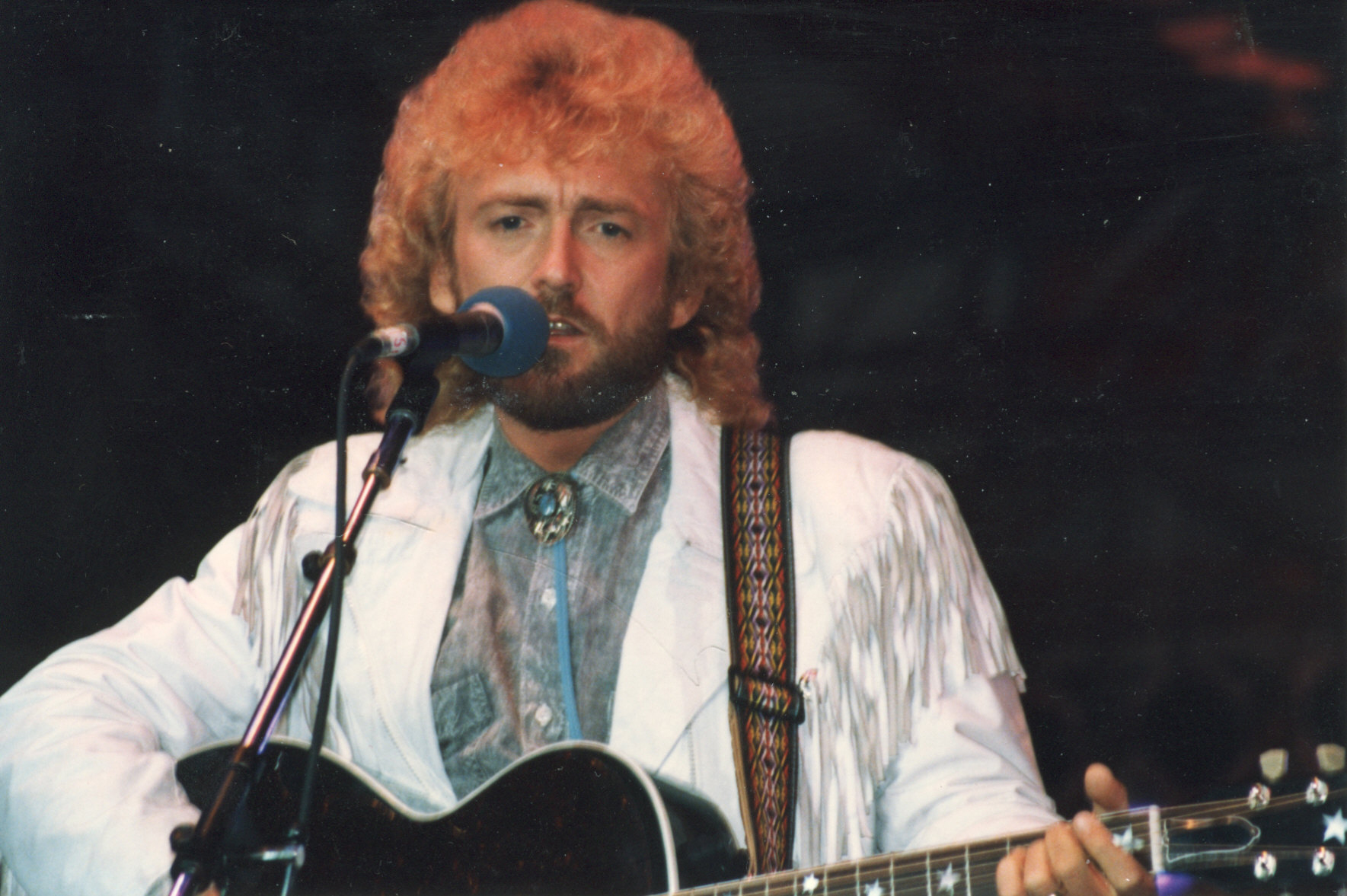
Morgan is the widow of Keith Whitley, who died in 1989.

Morgan is also known for her turbulent personal life. In a July 2004 televised interview on Larry King Live, she stated, "Drama is something that lets you know you're still alive." Morgan is Catholic.

Morgan's first husband was Ron Gaddis, a musician in George Jones' road band, to whom she was married from 1979 to 1981. The two had one daughter, Morgan Anastasia Gaddis. Her second marriage was to country music singer Keith Whitley, which lasted from 1986 until Whitley's death from alcohol poisoning in 1989. On her relationship with Whitley, she said in 1994 that "at this point in my life, if I met another Keith Whitley, I would walk away 'cause I don't think I could handle it. But as far as him being The One, yeah, I think we could have lasted forever." They had one son, Jesse Keith Whitley.

In 1991, she married Brad Thompson, a former bus driver for Clint Black, but the two divorced in 1993. During her marriage to Brad Thompson, she suffered from ovarian cysts, a condition that led to a hysterectomy. Morgan began dating American football player Troy Aikman in late 1993, but they amicably separated by year's end. From 1994 to 1996, Morgan was in a relationship with politician Fred Thompson. Morgan observed that their relationship had increased her personal interest in politics but had also caused her to "stop and think about the political implications of everything before I uttered a word in public." She also observed that she wished to marry Thompson but thought that marrying a politician would create personal conflicts between the two of them.

Morgan married country singer Jon Randall in 1996, and a year later, she published an autobiography, Forever Yours, Faithfully: My Love Story. In 1998, tabloids published allegations that Morgan had been spotted in the back of a limousine with Bill Clinton, then the President of the United States, but Morgan dismissed the claims as "fabricated". Morgan and Randall divorced in 1999. She married her fifth husband, country singer Sammy Kershaw, on September 29, 2001. Morgan filed for divorce, citing irreconcilable differences, on October 23, 2007. In 2008, Morgan filed for Chapter 7 bankruptcy, with an estimated $1 to $10 million in debts. She would later state that her bankruptcy was because she "didn't watch [her] own money" or audit her accountants. On September 15, 2010, she married her sixth husband, Tennessee business owner Randy White. They remained married until White's death from oral cancer on June 1, 2025.

== Discography ==
- 1989: Leave the Light On
- 1991: Something in Red
- 1992: Watch Me
- 1993: Merry Christmas from London
- 1994: War Paint
- 1996: Greater Need
- 1997: Shakin' Things Up
- 1998: Secret Love
- 1999: My Heart
- 2004: Show Me How
- 2008: I Walk Alone
- 2009: A Moment in Time
- 2013: Dos Divas (with Pam Tillis)
- 2016: Letting Go...Slow
- 2017: Come See Me and Come Lonely (with Pam Tillis)
- 2024: Dead Girl Walking

== Awards and nominations ==
=== Grammy Awards ===
Year	Nominee / work	Award	Result	Ref.
1990	"'Til a Tear Becomes a Rose" (with Keith Whitley)	Best Country Collaboration with Vocals	Nominated	
1993	"Something in Red"	Best Female Country Vocal Performance	Nominated	
1996	"Hope: Country Music's Quest for a Cure" (with various artists)	Best Country Collaboration with Vocals	Nominated	

=== Academy of Country Music Awards ===
Year	Nominee / work	Award	Result	Ref.
1984	Lorrie Morgan	Top New Female Vocalist	Nominated	
1990	"Out of Your Shoes"	Song of the Year	Shortlisted	
1990	Lorrie Morgan	Top Female Vocalist	Shortlisted	
1992	Lorrie Morgan	Top Female Vocalist	Nominated	
1993	Lorrie Morgan	Top Female Vocalist	Nominated	
1993	"Something in Red"	Song of the Year	Nominated	
1994	Common Thread: The Songs of the Eagles	Album of the Year	Nominated	
1997	Jon Randall and Lorrie Morgan	Top Vocal Duet	Nominated	

=== TNN/Music City News Country Awards ===
Year	Nominee / work	Award	Result
1990	Lorrie Morgan	Star of Tomorrow	Nominated
1990	Lorrie Morgan	Female Artist of the Year	Nominated
1990	"Dear Me"	Video of the Year	Nominated
1991	"'Til a Tear Becomes a Rose"	Single of the Year	Nominated
1991	Lorrie Morgan and Keith Whitley	Vocal Collaboration of the Year	Won
1991	Lorrie Morgan	Female Artist of the Year	Nominated
1992	Lorrie Morgan	Female Artist of the Year	Nominated
1993	Lorrie Morgan	Female Artist of the Year	Nominated
1994	Lorrie Morgan	Female Artist of the Year	Won
1994	Common Thread: The Songs of the Eagles	Album of the Year	Nominated
1994	"What Part of No"	Single of the Year	Nominated
1995	Lorrie Morgan	Female Artist of the Year	Nominated
1996	Lorrie Morgan	Female Artist of the Year	Won
1997	Lorrie Morgan	Female Artist of the Year	Won
1997	Lorrie Morgan and Jon Randall	Vocal Collaboration of the Year	Won
1998	Lorrie Morgan	Female Artist of the Year	Won

=== Country Music Association Awards ===
Year	Nominee / work	Award	Result	Ref.
1989	"Dear Me"	Video of the Year	Nominated	
1990	Lorrie Morgan	Horizon Award	Nominated	
1990	Lorrie Morgan	Female Vocalist of the Year	Nominated	
1990	"'Til a Tear Becomes a Rose" (with Keith Whitley)	Vocal Event of the Year	Won	
1991	Lorrie Morgan	Female Vocalist of the Year	Nominated	
1994	Common Thread: The Songs of the Eagles	Album of the Year	Won	
