= Indianapolis Youth Orchestra =

Music organisation in Indiana, U.S.

The Indianapolis Youth Orchestra (formerly known as the New World Youth Orchestras) is an organization in Indianapolis, Indiana that exists "to develop the musical talent and nurture the personal growth of young people in Indianapolis and central Indiana through the rehearsal and performance of orchestral masterworks, both traditional and contemporary." The Indianapolis Youth Orchestra was founded by Susan Kitterman in 1982 and currently consists of four separate orchestras:

- Indianapolis Youth Symphony Orchestra, directed by Adam Bodony
- Indianapolis Youth Philharmonic Orchestra, directed by Heather Nieto
- Indianapolis Youth Concert Orchestra, directed by Johanna Kitchell
- Indianapolis Youth Prelude Orchestra, directed by Katie Le Sesne

The symphony and philharmonic play three concerts every year, all of which are held at Hilbert Circle Theatre in downtown Indianapolis or the Payne & Mencias Palladium at the Allied Solutions Center for the Arts in Carmel. Concert and Prelude orchestras perform at the Indiana Historical Society in the fall and joins the other orchestras for two performances in the spring. All four orchestras participate in the season finale at the Hilbert Circle Theatre which takes place usually on Mother's day.

== History ==
Susan Kitterman Conducting the New World Youth Symphony Orchestra

Susan Kitterman founded the Indianapolis Youth Orchestras in 1982. After helping start the orchestra program in the Carmel Clay school system, Ms. Kitterman left her job to start a family. However, she missed conducting her student ensembles, so she decided to get a group of her former students together to start a small, extracurricular musical ensemble. The group formed during the early fall of 1982 and began with eighteen students made up of string, recorder, and flute players. Rehearsals were held at the Carmel Friends Church, and their first concert was held at Second Presbyterian Church on Meridian Street. At this time, the purpose of the organization was simple: to be a place where kids who were serious about studying their instrument could get together with other kids like them that really wanted to play their instruments seriously in an ensemble. The goal was to rehearse and perform at the highest level possible.

The following year, the orchestra grew to about thirty students and kept building from there. By the 1984 season, the orchestra had a full wind section. Information about the organization spread mostly by word of mouth. Ms. Kitterman also publicized through private teachers. The group very quickly out grew the stage in the multipurpose room in the Carmel Friend's Church, which prompted a move to a new location. Ms. Kitterman decided to look for a location that was more centrally located, and rehearsals moved to North Methodist Church on 38th Street and Meridian.

As New World gained momentum, many string players, especially violinists, were expressing interest in joining the orchestra, but not all were ready to play in the ensemble. In order to provide a place for those who were not quite ready to play in New World, Ms. Kitterman decided to start a second orchestra. The Indianapolis Youth Orchestra was founded in 1992, a decade after the New World Chamber Orchestra began.

About the time the Indianapolis Youth Orchestra was founded, North Methodist Church was becoming more active and needed the space used for New World rehearsals more often. This prompted New World to find a new rehearsal location. For a couple of years, the organization struggled to find a home, rehearsing in venues such as the Athenaeum and the Indiana Landmarks Society downtown. In 1993, New World moved their office to Symphony Centre, and the Hilbert Circle Theatre became the primary rehearsal location as well as a performance venue for the organization. New World held its first performance at the Hilbert Circle Theatre in 1993, and still holds many of its concerts at this location.

By 1995, the organization had grown to over one hundred members, and the top orchestra changed its name to the New World Youth Symphony Orchestra, since it was no longer a chamber sized ensemble. In 2005, the organization expanded yet again to a third orchestra. The Debut Orchestra was founded for similar reasons as the Indianapolis Youth Orchestra. There were many young string players who were playing very well, but if they were accepted into the Indianapolis Youth Orchestra, they would hold the ensemble back. In order to give these players an opportunity to perform in an ensemble New World began the Debut Orchestra. About this time, the Indianapolis Youth Orchestra was renamed the New World Youth Philharmonic Orchestra. About three years later, the Debut Orchestra was renamed the New World Youth Concert Orchestra. In 2020, the organization revealed a new name change: The Indianapolis Youth Orchestra.

== The Young Artist Concerto Competition ==
In 1988, New World began the Young Artist Concerto Competition. Susan Kitterman felt that there were many students in the orchestra that would benefit from performing a solo with the orchestra. She tried to give as many of these students such an opportunity, but there were other talented students not in the orchestra that she heard about who could enjoy the benefits of such an experience. Thus, the Young Artist Concerto Competition began. The annual competition has two separate divisions: the junior division for students up to age thirteen, and the senior division for students fourteen through eighteen. The winners are awarded cash prizes and the opportunity to perform with New World Youth Symphony Orchestra. The philharmonic sponsors an internal concerto competition each season.

== Honors, awards, and current activities ==
In recent years, the Indianapolis Youth Orchestra has performed with other youth and professional organizations. Joint concerts with the Indianapolis Children's Choir, Indianapolis Youth Chorale, Indianapolis Arts Chorale, Indianapolis Chamber Orchestra, and Butler University Choirs have been extremely rewarding. Since 1993, the orchestra annually opens its concert season at the Hilbert Circle Theatre, home of the Indianapolis Symphony Orchestra. These concerts have featured the retired concertmaster of the Indianapolis Symphony Orchestra, Hidetaro Suzuki; internationally acclaimed cellist, Janos Starker; former Indianapolis Mayor William Hudnut; pianist Zeyda Ruga Suzuki; Michael Isaac Strauss, principal violist of the Indianapolis Symphony; actor Clancy Brown; cellist David Darling; Corey Cerovsek; International Violin Competition of Indianapolis laureate Svetlin Roussev; Marianne Tobias, pianist and program annotator; Scott Hostettler, New World alumnus and Chicago Symphony oboist; Grace Fong, pianist and professor at Chapman University; Frank Glover, jazz musician and Indianapolis native; world-renowned trumpeter Allen Vizzutti; and for the fall 2013 opening concert and fall opening concert of the 2017–18 season, pianist Jeeyoon Kim.

Orchestra members participate in a variety of activities, including master classes, section coaching, intensive rehearsal retreats, and visits to collegiate music schools in Indiana. Butler University, Ball State University, and Indiana University have provided coaching and space for rehearsals and workshops. Many musicians also attend summer music camps and participate in concerto competitions, including the Indiana All-State Orchestra and Band, the Indianapolis Symphony Orchestra's Side-by-Side Program, and the ISSMA Solo & Ensemble contests. New World is also well represented at Interlochen Arts Camp, the Aspen Music Festival, the Meadowmount School of Music, the Eastern Music Festival, as well as the Honor Orchestra of America.

The 1995–1996 season marked two firsts for the New World Youth Symphony Orchestra. It recorded its first professional compact disc, now in its second printing. In July, the orchestra toured Germany, Austria, and Switzerland enjoying standing room only crowds and enthusiastic standing ovations. The highlight of the tour was participating in the Silver Anniversary of the Youth and Music Festival in Vienna, Austria.

In March 2006, the New World Chamber Orchestra was awarded First Place honors in the youth orchestra division of the National Orchestra Festival at the American String Teachers Association national convention in Kansas City, Missouri.

In March 2015, the New World Youth Symphony successfully auditioned for the Manhattan Concert Productions's Debut Series, an audition, not a pay-to-play, selection process. The orchestra traveled to New York City in April 2016 for a four-day residency culminating in a 30-minute performance in Carnegie Hall. The Indianapolis Youth Symphony Orchestra has continued this tour every three years since, including trips in 2019, 2022, and most recently 2025.
