= Dos Divas =

Studio album by Lorrie Morgan and Pam Tillis
- Released: July 23, 2013
- Recorded: 2012–2013
- Studio: Blackbird Studios and Sound Emporium Studios (Nashville, Tennessee)
- Genre: Country
- Length: 50:16
- Label: Red River Entertainment
- Producer: Lorrie Morgan; Pam Tillis; Matt Spicher

Lorrie Morgan chronology
I Walk Alone (2010)	Dos Divas (2013)	Letting Go...Slow (2016)

Pam Tillis chronology
Recollection (2012)	Dos Divas (2013)	Looking for a Feeling (2020)

Singles from Dos Divas
- 1. "I Know What You Did Last Night" Released: June 10, 2013; 2. "I Am a Woman" Released: October 2013

Dos Divas is a 2013 album by country music artists Lorrie Morgan and Pam Tillis. It features the single "I Know What You Did Last Night". The collection features 14 tracks; of these tracks, 6 are duets. The pair have recorded four tracks each as soloists for this collection.

== Track listing ==
No.	Title	Writer(s)	Performer	Length
1.	"I Am a Woman"	Mary Sue Englund, Thom Shepherd	Lorrie Morgan and Pam Tillis	3:57
2.	"I Know What You Did Last Night"	Karyn Rochelle, Al Anderson	Lorrie Morgan and Pam Tillis	2:56
3.	"Dos Divas"	Pam Tillis, Lorrie Morgan, Mark Oliverius	Lorrie Morgan and Pam Tillis	3:58
4.	"I'm Tired"	Mel Tillis, Webb Pierce, Buck Peddy	Lorrie Morgan and Pam Tillis	1:42
5.	"Last Night's Make Up"	Jessie Jo Dillion, Brandy Clark, Shane McAnally	Lorrie Morgan	2:54
6.	"Ain't Enough Roses"	Lisa Brokop, Sam Hogin, Bob Regan	Pam Tillis	3:34
7.	"Another Chance To"	Joe West, Tom Shapiro, Tammi Kidd	Lorrie Morgan	3:17
8.	"Even the Stars"	Tommy Lee James, Danielle Peck	Pam Tillis	3:46
9.	"That's So Cool"	Morgan, Eddy Raven, Frank J. Myers	Lorrie Morgan	3:27
10.	"Old Enough to Be Your Lover"	Lisa Carver	Pam Tillis	4:00
11.	"Next Time It Rains"	Kidd, Lynn Hutton, John Henderson	Lorrie Morgan	3:42
12.	"I Envy the Sun"	Jean Schott	Pam Tillis	5:26
13.	"Bless Their Hearts"	P. Tillis, Jimmy Ritchey, Joanna Smith	Lorrie Morgan and Pam Tillis	3:30
14.	"What Was I Thinkin'"	Morgan, P. Tillis	Lorrie Morgan and Pam Tillis	4:04

== Personnel ==
- Lorrie Morgan – vocals (1–5, 7, 9, 11, 13, 14)
- Pam Tillis – vocals (1–4, 6, 8, 10, 12–14), backing vocals (3, 5, 10, 12)
- Mark Oliverius – acoustic piano (1, 2, 5, 7, 8, 11, 13, 14), upright piano (3), synthesizers (5), Hammond B3 organ (8, 9), Wurlitzer electric piano (10, 13)
- John Barlow Jarvis – acoustic piano (6, 12)
- Roger Eaton – electric guitar (1–3, 5, 7–11, 13, 14), acoustic guitar (4), backing vocals (11)
- Danny Parks – acoustic guitar (1, 5, 7, 8, 10, 11, 14), gut string guitar (1, 3), baritone guitar (4), 12-string guitar (5), mandolin (7, 11), resonator guitar (13), electric guitar (14)
- Kenny Vaughan – electric guitar (2)
- Matt Spicher – archtop guitar (4), electric guitar (12), string arrangements (12)
- J.T. Corenflos – electric guitar (12)
- Darin Favorite – electric guitar solo (12)
- Donnie Herron – lap steel guitar (2, 4)
- Chris Scruggs – lap steel guitar (2)
- Steve Sheehan – resonator guitar (6), acoustic guitar (12)
- Dan Dugmore – dobro (6), steel guitar (12)
- Smith Curry – banjo (9), dobro (13), steel guitar (13, 14)
- Craig Nelson – bass (1, 3, 5, 7–11, 13, 14), arco bass (7)
- David Spicher – bass (2, 4)
- Michael Rhodes – bass (6, 12)
- Brian Pruitt – drums (1–5, 7–9, 11, 13, 14), loops (5, 9, 11), percussion (7, 11)
- Steve Brewster – drums (6, 12)
- Glen Caruba – percussion (3), Chapman stick (4), tambourine (10)
- Pat Buchanan – harmonica (5, 10), electric guitar (12)
- Chris Carmichael – strings (1)
- Billy Contreras – fiddle (3, 4)
- Buddy Spicher– fiddle (4), violin (12), string arrangements (12)
- Megan Lynch – fiddle (7, 9, 10, 14), strings (7, 8), backing vocals (10)
- John Catchings – cello (12)
- David Angell – violin (12)
- Tania Hancheroff – backing vocals (2, 10, 13)
- Mary Sue Englund – backing vocals (6)
- Bethany Olds – backing vocals (6)
- Kristen Gartner – backing vocals (12)
- Lona Heins – backing vocals (12)
- Wes Hightower – backing vocals (13)

== Production ==
- Lorrie Morgan – producer
- Pam Tillis – producer
- Matt Spicher – co-producer (1–5, 7–11, 13, 14), producer (6, 12), mixing, photography
- Rodney Dawson – recording (1–5, 7–11, 13, 14), mix assistant
- Dave Sinko – recording (6, 12)
- Leland Elliott – recording assistant (1–5, 7–11, 13, 14)
- Adam Beard – recording assistant (6, 12)
- Cory Stone – mix assistant
- Tommy Dorsey – mastering at Masterfonics (Nashville, Tennessee)
- Kelley Corbitt – production coordinator
- Jacy Dawn Wolti – production coordinator
- Mary Sue Englund – art design
- Paula Turner – make-up
- Tena Rogers – wardrobe stylist
- Linda Stowe – wardrobe stylist

== Chart performance ==
Chart (2013)	Peak position
U.S. Billboard Top Country Albums	62
