= My Favorite Things (song) =

1959 show tune from the musical The Sound of Music

Song
- Published: 1959 by Williamson Music
- Genre: Show tune
- Composer: Richard Rodgers
- Lyricist: Oscar Hammerstein II

"My Favorite Things" is a show tune from the 1959 Rodgers and Hammerstein musical The Sound of Music.

In the original Broadway production, the song was introduced by Mary Martin playing Maria and Patricia Neway playing Mother Abbess. Julie Andrews first performed the song in a 1961 Christmas special for The Garry Moore Show, recording it again when she starred as Maria in the 1965 film adaptation of the musical.

Many of the favorite things evoke winter time imagery including warm mittens, packages, sleigh bells, snowflakes, and silver white winters. The song's cozy lyrics inspired its adoption as a staple of the holiday season, significantly bolstered by the movie's popularity.

The screen version of the song was ranked number 64 on AFI's 100 Years...100 Songs, a 2004 survey of top tunes in American cinema.

== Cover versions ==
John Coltrane played a 14-minute version in E minor as the title track of an album recorded in October 1960 and released in March 1961. It became a signature song for Coltrane in concert, also appearing on Newport '63 in 1963. Coltrane's recording turned the song into a jazz standard that was included in the Real Book. Coltrane's version was interpolated by André 3000 on the song of the same name, from the Outkast album, Speakerboxxx/The Love Below.

In 1961, jazz vocalist Mark Murphy recorded the song on his 1962 Riverside Records album Rah track 8.

In 1964, Jack Jones became the first of many artists to include the song on a Christmas album.

In 1965, a popular version of the song performed by Diana Ross and The Supremes was included in the group's album release Merry Christmas. Their version was featured in the 2018 Christmas film of The Grinch soundtrack.

Herb Alpert and the Tijuana Brass released a version in 1969 as a single from their 1968 album, Christmas Album. It reached number 45 on the Billboard 100.

Kenny Rogers recorded a version which appeared on his first holiday album titled "Christmas" in 1981.

Lorrie Morgan's version appeared in 1994 and again in 1999 at number 64 and number 69, respectively, on the Hot Country Songs chart after she recorded it for her 1993 album, Merry Christmas from London.

UK R&B group Big Brovaz released a version in 2003 titled "Favourite Things" with reworked lyrics about expensive and glamorous objects.

Chicago dropped a Latin beat onto their 2011 version featured on their album, Chicago XXXIII: O Christmas Three. It reached the Top 10 on the Billboard Adult Contemporary chart.

In her 2019 song "7 Rings", Ariana Grande interpolates the melody of "My Favorite Things". The song topped the charts in 15 countries.

Christina Aguilera covered the song in 2025 for her theatrical concert film Christina Aguilera: Christmas in Paris, directed by Sam Wrench.

== Charts ==
=== The Supremes version ===
Chart (1966)	Peak position
Singapore (Billboard)	10

=== Glee Cast version ===
Chart (2011–2012)	Peak position
Hot Canadian Digital Song Sales (Billboard)	74
US Holiday Digital Song Sales (Billboard)	21

=== Christina Aguilera version ===
Weekly chart performance for "My Favorite Things"
Chart (2025)	Peak position
Costa Rica Anglo Airplay (Monitor Latino)	14
