= Good as I Was to You =

Single by Lorrie Morgan

from the album Greater Need
- B-side: "She Walked Beside the Wagon"
- Released: December 1996
- Genre: Country
- Length: 3:28
- Label: BNA
- Songwriters: Don Schlitz; Billy Livsey
- Producer: James Stroud

Lorrie Morgan singles chronology
"I Just Might Be" (1996)	"Good as I Was to You" (1996)	"Go Away" (1997)

"Good as I Was to You" is a song written by Billy Livsey and Don Schlitz, and recorded by American country music artist Lorrie Morgan. It was released in December 1996 as the third and final single from her album Greater Need. The song reached #4 on the Billboard Hot Country Singles & Tracks chart in May 1997.

== Content ==
The song depicts a woman who, after learning her significant other (either her husband or boyfriend; no distinction is made in the song), confronts him in a restaurant, where he is dining with another woman. The woman angrily tells him all the good things she's done for him and expresses disgust and disappointment that he would respond by cheating on her. She then tells the other woman that she can have him and that she (the protagonist) no longer wants anything to do with her now ex.

== Music video ==
The video for the song was directed by Michael Salomon. It shows Morgan pulling up in her car to a cafe on a very rainy day. She attempts to open the door, but doesn't once she looks through the window and sees her boyfriend with another woman. She eventually goes in and confronts him, and once he tries to apologize, she angrily pulls her arm back and walks away crying. She sings the last words of the song in her car before driving away. The other woman, having seen the drama unfold between Lorrie and her boyfriend, eventually gets up from the table herself and leaves, leaving the boyfriend with nobody. Lorrie is also shown performing the song while outside the cafe, at times banging on the window to show emotion.

== Chart performance ==
Chart (1996–1997)	Peak position
Canada Country Singles (RPM)	17
US Hot Country Songs (Billboard)	4

=== Year-end charts ===
Chart (1997)	Position
US Country Songs (Billboard)	49
