= Something in Red (song) =

1991 song by Angela Kaset

Single by Angela Kaset
- B-side: "Let Your Heart Take Over"
- Released: 7 May 1991
- Length: 4:29
- Label: Dover
- Songwriter: Angela Kaset
- Producers: Angela Kaset; Jewel Coburn; Tom Dampher

"Something in Red" is a song written and originally recorded by Angela Kaset. Her version was released as a single in the UK by Dover Records on 7 May 1991, and peaked at number 124 in the UK Singles Chart. American country music artist Lorrie Morgan released her version in May 1992 as the fourth single and title track from her second studio album, Something in Red. Morgan's version reached number 14 on the Billboard Hot Country Singles & Tracks chart and peaked at number 10 on the RPM Country Tracks in Canada. The song also earned Morgan her first and only nomination for the Grammy Award for Best Female Country Vocal Performance.

In 2004, British musical theater actress Elaine Paige recorded the song for inclusion on her "best of" compilation album Centre Stage, released the same year.

== Background ==
Kaset described "Something in Red" in 1992 as a "basic life-of-love kind of story that most people who ever have a relationship go through... the beginning with the red and meeting somebody and wanting to catch their eye".

The song is sung from the perspective of a woman going through the romantic events of her life looking for certain colors for a dress reflecting her current emotional state. For instance, the titular color red grabs the attention of her future lover; while green illustrates envy and jealousy to bring him back after a breakup; white reflects purity and perfection in a wedding dress; and she requests blue for a baby boy, born as she is experiencing a lull in the adventure of her marriage. She concludes the song by looking for a red dress "like the one when I first turned his head", suggesting that the passion has cooled, but is far from dead.

== Charts ==
| Chart (1991) | Peak position |
|---|---|
| UK Singles Chart (OCC) | 124 |

== Lorrie Morgan version ==
"Something in Red"

Single by Lorrie Morgan

from the album Something in Red
- B-side: "It's Too Late (To Love Me Now)"
- Released: May 9, 1992
- Genre: Country
- Length: 4:35
- Label: RCA Nashville
- Songwriter: Angela Kaset
- Producer: Richard Landis

Lorrie Morgan singles chronology
| "Except for Monday" (1991) | "Something in Red" (1992) | "Watch Me" (1992) |

Morgan came to record the song after Kaset's publisher, Barry and Jewel Coburn, pitched the song to Morgan's producer Barry Beckett and record label RCA Records. Morgan admitted her initial reluctance to record the song, telling the Gannett News Service in 1992, "I just couldn't hear it. I never got past the first verse. I turned if off and said it's not me. I didn't give it a chance because I didn't know what it was about." During the recording of her second studio album, Morgan's new producer Richard Landis also suggested she record the song. She revealed, "I finally got to the third verse and said 'golly, what have I been missing?' Once I got it, it was a hit."

=== Music video ===
The music video was directed by Jim Shea and premiered in March 1992.

=== Charts ===
| Chart (1992) | Peak position |
|---|---|
| Canada Country Singles (RPM) | 10 |
| US Hot Country Songs (Billboard) | 14 |

==== Year-end charts ====
| Chart (1992) | Position |
|---|---|
| Canada Country Tracks (RPM) | 93 |
