= By My Side (Lorrie Morgan and Jon Randall song) =

Single by Lorrie Morgan with Jon Randall

from the album Greater Need
- B-side: "Candy Kisses"
- Released: April 15, 1996
- Recorded: 1995
- Genre: Country
- Length: 2:54
- Label: BNA
- Songwriter: Constant Change
- Producer: James Stroud

Lorrie Morgan singles chronology
"Standing Tall" (1996)	"By My Side" (1996)	"I Just Might Be" (1996)

Jon Randall singles chronology
"This Heart" (1994)	"By My Side" (1996)	"She Don't Believe in Fairy Tales" (1998)

"By My Side" is a song written by Constant Change and recorded by American country music artists Lorrie Morgan and Jon Randall. It was released in April 1996 as the first single from Morgan's album Greater Need. The song reached No. 18 on the Billboard Hot Country Singles & Tracks chart.

== History ==
Morgan originally recorded the song as a duet with Sammy Kershaw, but Kershaw's label "didn't want to use it". As a result, the chairman of Morgan's label recommended that she record it with Randall instead.

== Critical reception ==
Wendy Newcomer of Cash Box reviewed the single favorably, stating that it was a "charming duet" and "The combination of Morgan’s grit and Randall’s airy tenor make [sic] radio fireworks."

== Chart performance ==
Chart (1996)	Peak position
Canada Country Singles (RPM)	21
US Bubbling Under Hot 100 (Billboard)	10
US Hot Country Songs (Billboard)	18
