= Go Away (Lorrie Morgan song) =

Lorrie Morgan song

Single by Lorrie Morgan

from the album Shakin' Things Up
- B-side: "I've Enjoyed as Much of This as I Can Stand"
- Released: July 21, 1997
- Recorded: 1997
- Genre: Country
- Length: 2:50
- Label: BNA
- Songwriters: Stephony Smith; Cathy Majeski; Sunny Russ
- Producers: Lorrie Morgan; James Stroud

Lorrie Morgan singles chronology
"Good as I Was to You" (1997)	"Go Away" (1997)	"One of Those Nights Tonight" (1997)

"Go Away" is a song written by Stephony Smith, Cathy Majeski and Sunny Russ, and recorded by American country music artist Lorrie Morgan. It was released in July 1997 as the first single from her album Shakin' Things Up. The song reached #3 on the Billboard Hot Country Singles & Tracks chart in October 1997. This was Morgan's last top 10 hit on the Billboard Country charts. It is also notable as Morgan's only solo appearance on the Billboard Hot 100 chart, peaking at number 85.

== Chart performance ==
Chart (1997)	Peak position
Canada Country Singles (RPM)	3
US Billboard Hot 100	85
US Hot Country Songs (Billboard)	3

=== Year-end charts ===
Chart (1997)	Position
Canada Country Tracks (RPM)	65
US Country Songs (Billboard)	42
