= I Didn't Know My Own Strength (Lorrie Morgan song) =

Single by Lorrie Morgan

from the album Reflections: Greatest Hits
- B-side: "War Paint"
- Released: May 6, 1995
- Genre: Country
- Length: 3:19
- Label: BNA
- Songwriters: Rick Bowles, Robert Byrne
- Producer: James Stroud

Lorrie Morgan singles chronology
"Heart over Mind" (1994)	"I Didn't Know My Own Strength" (1995)	"Back in Your Arms Again" (1995)

"I Didn't Know My Own Strength" is a song written by Rick Bowles and Robert Byrne, and recorded by American country music artist Lorrie Morgan. It was released in May 1995 as the first single from her compilation album Reflections: Greatest Hits. The song became Morgan's third and final Number One on the U.S. country singles charts in August 1995.

== Charts ==
=== Weekly charts ===
Chart (1995)	Peak position
Canada Country Singles (RPM)	12
US Hot Country Songs (Billboard)	1

=== Year-end charts ===
Chart (1995)	Position
US Country Songs (Billboard)	23
