= Richard Landis =

American record producer (1946–2023)

- Born: February 18, 1946; Queens, New York, U.S.
- Died: May 16, 2023 (aged 77) Nashville, Tennessee, U.S.
- Genres: Country; adult contemporary
- Occupations: Record producer; recording engineer; singer-songwriter
- Years active: 1967–2023

Richard Landis (February 18, 1946 – May 16, 2023) was an American record producer and musician. He had over 40 years of professional credits and chart success including a share of the 1994 CMA award for Album of the Year. At year's end, Billboard ranked Landis 18th of the top 25 producers in country music.

Landis had production tenure with several acclaimed labels including Capitol, Columbia, and RCA. In 2007, Landis opened his own studio in Nashville called Fool on the Hill, and as of 2013, engineered and produced music there. His accomplishments include musical credits with acts including Van Stephenson, Eddie Rabbitt, Kenny Rogers, Lorrie Morgan, Doug Supernaw, Neil Diamond, Poco, and Vince Gill. He had production credits from Juice Newton to Red Rider and The Nitty Gritty Dirt Band.

== History ==
Richard Landis attended The High School of Music & Art and was a member of the graduating class of 1962. He was an accomplished pianist and was called "one devil of a piano player" by Bob Glassenberg in a Billboard article.

In 1970, Richard Landis formed an acoustic blues band with Spencer Davis and Peter Jameson. They released It's Been So Long on Mediarts and the band toured with POCO in 1971. It's Been So Long was produced by Jay Sentor who spotted Landis' talent and announced his plans to produce a Landis album. He said in a Billboard article that he "planned to cut that heavy piano player in the Davis & Jameson group as a solo performer, backed by a nine-piece band."

In 1972, Richard Landis released his solo album Natural Causes to a mixed reception and limited success. The album produced two singles, "A Man Who Sings" and "Natural Causes" which peaked on the adult contemporary charts at 35 and 40 respectively. 1972 saw Landis' first commercial production credit as well. He produced Peter Allen's second album, Tenterfield Saddler, released on Metromedia. Landis also appeared on the album with musician credits.

In 1978, Richard Landis was named West Coast director, talent acquisition for Capitol records based in Los Angeles. Landis previously held an identical position in New York City as East Coast director.

In 1981, Richard Landis began producing music for Juice Newton. They released her multi-platinum album, Juice which charted two #1 singles and one #2. In an interview Juice Newton cited her lucky break as being the day she met Richard Landis: "I believe that hooking up with Richard Landis who produced those first big hits on the Juice LP (Queen of Hearts, Angel in the Morning) was my lucky break." That same year, he produced Red Rider's classic rock hit "Lunatic Fringe."

While living in Los Angeles, Landis owned and operated a recording studio called The Grey Room, in his house, where artists such as Vince Gill, Tori Amos, Joan Armatrading, Tina Turner, and The Smithereens recorded and mixed their albums. In the late 1980s and early 1990s, there was a battle between the legitimate studio owners in LA, who had to pay all the overheads a business incurs, and the new breed of high-end home studios. They came after Landis and shut him down. So he made a deal with Jim David (Hal David's son) and built a duplicate of the Grey Room in a space in Jim David's One on One studios in North Hollywood. In 2012, it became 17 Hertz.

In 1992, Richard Landis was the VP of A&R for BNA Records. Lorrie Morgan left RCA Records and joined BNA to remain with Landis. Landis left his position with BNA in 1993 but continued to produce for the label on an independent basis, continuing his affiliation as a consultant.

In May 1994, Landis produced Lorrie Morgan's top 10 album, War Paint. He also co-wrote "If You Come Back From Heaven" which was one of the three singles released. It entered the Billboard country charts in June 1994 and peaked at #51. Also in 1994 Landis was one of 14 producers to receive a CMA Album of the Year award for Common Thread: The Songs of the Eagles. Landis produced the last track on the album, Lorrie Morgan's cover of "The Sad Café". Billboard's end of year special edition ranked the top 25 country music producers of 1994. Landis was placed eighteenth on the list, having produced 11 charted hits for that year.

From 1993 to 2000, Landis and James Stroud co-owned a major recording studio in Nashville called Loud Recording, as well as an overdub and mixing suite next door called Too Loud.

In 2010, Landis was nominated for the CMAA Album of the Year for production of Adam Brand's Hell of a Ride, an album which peaked at #19 on the ARIA Charts.

Landis died on May 16, 2023, at the age of 77.
