= Sammy Kershaw discography =

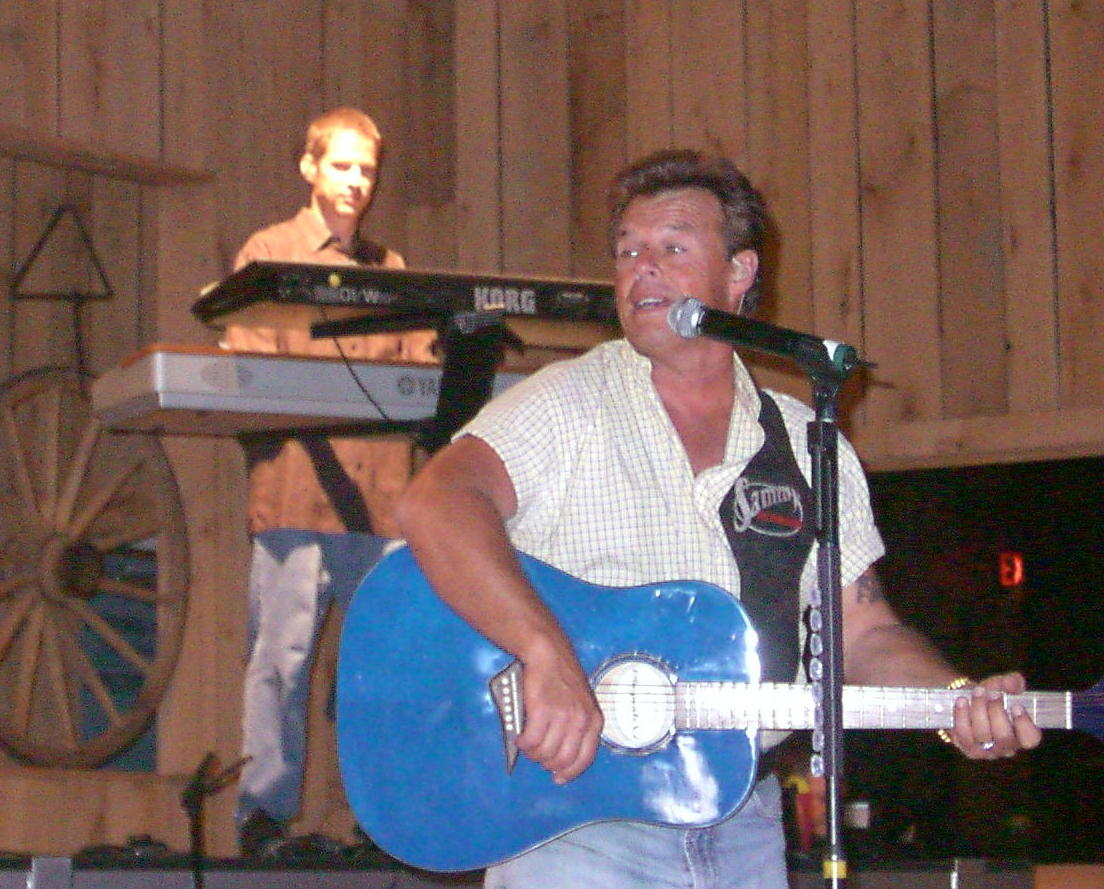
- Studio albums: 17
- Compilation albums: 6
- Singles: 48
- Music videos: 25

The discography of American country music singer Sammy Kershaw comprises 17 studio albums, six compilation albums, 48 singles, and 25 music videos. Three of his studio albums are certified platinum by the RIAA, while two of his studio albums and his first greatest hits package have been certified gold. Although only one of his singles — 1993's "She Don't Know She's Beautiful" — reached the top of the Billboard charts, 25 of his singles have been Top 40 hits. Besides "She Don't Know She's Beautiful", 10 more of these have reached the Top 10, including three songs which reached number two.

== Studio albums ==
=== 1990s ===
Title	Album details	Peak chart positions			Certifications (sales threshold)
Title	Album details	US Country	US	CAN Country	Certifications (sales threshold)
Don't Go Near the Water	Release date: October 8, 1991; Label: PolyGram/Mercury Records; Formats: CD, cassette	17	95	5	CAN: Platinum; US: Platinum
Business Is Pleasure	Release date: July 16, 1992; Label: MTE; Formats: CD, cassette	—	—	—	
Haunted Heart	Release date: March 9, 1993; Label: PolyGram/Mercury Records; Formats: CD, cassette	11	57	10	CAN: Gold; US: Platinum
Feelin' Good Train	Release date: June 21, 1994; Label: PolyGram/Mercury Records; Formats: CD, cassette	9	73	2	CAN: Gold; US: Gold
Christmas Time's A-Comin'	Release date: October 4, 1994; Label: PolyGram/Mercury Records; Formats: CD, cassette	52	—	—	
Politics, Religion and Her	Release date: May 7, 1996; Label: PolyGram/Mercury Records; Formats: CD, cassette	17	115	—	US: Gold
Labor of Love	Release date: November 4, 1997; Label: PolyGram/Mercury Records; Formats: CD, cassette	5	49	9	US: Platinum
Maybe Not Tonight	Release date: April 13, 1999; Label: Mercury Nashville; Formats: CD, cassette	7	99	—	
"—" denotes releases that did not chart

=== 2000s and 2010s ===
Title	Album details	Peak chart positions		
Title	Album details	US Country	US	US Indie
I Finally Found Someone (with Lorrie Morgan)	Release date: April 17, 2001; Label: RCA Nashville; Formats: CD, cassette	13	114	—
I Want My Money Back	Release date: March 25, 2003; Label: Audium/Koch Records; Formats: CD, music download	39	—	27
Honky Tonk Boots	Release date: June 27, 2006; Label: Category 5 Records; Formats: CD, music download	56	—	34
Better Than I Used to Be	Release date: August 31, 2010; Label: Big Hit Records; Formats: CD, music download	—	—	—
A Sammy Klaus Christmas	Release date: October 22, 2012; Label: MRI; Formats: CD, digital download	—	—	—
All in the Same Boat (with Joe Diffie and Aaron Tippin)	Release date: May 28, 2013; Label: Big Hit Records; Formats: CD, music download	70	—	—
Do You Know Me: A Tribute to George Jones	Release date: July 22, 2014; Label: Big Hit Records; Formats: CD, music download	37	—	—
I Won't Back Down	Release date: June 9, 2015; Label: Cleopatra Records; Formats: CD, music download	—	—	—
The Blues Got Me	Release date: May 13, 2016; Label: Big Hit Records; Formats: CD, music download	—	—	—
"—" denotes releases that did not chart

== Compilation albums ==
Title	Album details	Peak chart positions		Certifications (sales threshold)
Title	Album details	US Country	US	Certifications (sales threshold)
The Hits Chapter 1	Release date: September 12, 1995; Label: PolyGram/Mercury Records; Formats: CD, cassette	19	131	US: Gold
Covers the Hits	Release date: June 20, 2000; Label: Mercury Nashville; Formats: CD, cassette	—	—	
The Hits Chapter 2	Release date: May 15, 2001; Label: Mercury Nashville; Formats: CD, cassette	—	—	
20th Century Masters - The Millennium Collection	Release date: March 25, 2003; Label: Mercury Nashville; Formats: CD, music download	—	—	
The Definitive Collection	Release date: June 22, 2004; Label: Mercury Nashville; Formats: CD, music download	—	—	
Big Hits: Volume One (includes re-recorded versions plus 2 new songs)	Release date: November 11, 2013; Label: Big Hit Records; Formats: CD, music download	—	—	
"—" denotes releases that did not chart

== Singles ==
=== As lead artist ===
==== 1980s–1990s ====
Year	Single	Peak chart positions			Album
Year	Single	US Country	US	CAN Country	Album
1986	"The Flame Has Gone Out"	—	—	—	Business Is Pleasure
1987	"Diggy Liggy Lo" (with Tammy Lynn)	—	—	—	Non-album single
1987	"The Likes of Texas"	—	—	—	Business Is Pleasure
1991	"Cadillac Style"	3	—	3	Don't Go Near the Water
1992	"Don't Go Near the Water"	12	—	5	Don't Go Near the Water
1992	"Yard Sale"	17	—	13	Don't Go Near the Water
1992	"Anywhere but Here"	10	—	17	Don't Go Near the Water
1993	"She Don't Know She's Beautiful"	1	— (Note: "She Don't Know She's Beautiful" did not enter the Hot 100, but peaked at number 19 on Bubbling Under Hot 100 Singles.)	1	Haunted Heart
1993	"Haunted Heart"	9	—	10	Haunted Heart
1993	"Queen of My Double Wide Trailer"	7	—	3	Haunted Heart
1994	"I Can't Reach Her Anymore"	3	—	9	Haunted Heart
1994	"National Working Woman's Holiday"	2	—	3	Feelin' Good Train
1994	"Third Rate Romance"	2	— (Note: "Third Rate Romance" did not enter the Hot 100, but peaked at number 5 on Bubbling Under Hot 100 Singles.)	10	Feelin' Good Train
1994	"Southbound"	27	—	17	Feelin' Good Train
1994	"Christmas Time's A-Comin'"	50	—	—	Christmas Time's A-Comin'
1995	"If You're Gonna Walk, I'm Gonna Crawl"	18	—	15	Feelin' Good Train
1995	"Your Tattoo"	47	—	58	The Hits Chapter 1
1996	"Meant to Be"	5	—	4	Politics, Religion, and Her
1996	"Vidalia"	10	—	7	Politics, Religion, and Her
1996	"Politics, Religion and Her"	28	—	47	Politics, Religion, and Her
1997	"Fit to Be Tied Down"	29	—	49	Politics, Religion, and Her
1997	"Love of My Life"	2	85	3	Labor of Love
1998	"Matches"	22	—	30	Labor of Love
1998	"Honky Tonk America"	31	—	37	Labor of Love
1998	"One Day Left to Live"	35	—	52	Labor of Love
1999	"Maybe Not Tonight" (with Lorrie Morgan)	17	86	27	Maybe Not Tonight
1999	"When You Love Someone"	37	—	61	Maybe Not Tonight
1999	"Me and Maxine"	35	—	57	Maybe Not Tonight
"—" denotes releases that did not chart

==== 2000s–2020s ====
Year	Single	Peak positions	Album
Year	Single	US Country	Album
2000	"Louisiana Hot Sauce"	—	Maybe Not Tonight
2001	"He Drinks Tequila" (with Lorrie Morgan)	39	I Finally Found Someone
2001	"I Finally Found Someone" (with Lorrie Morgan)	—	I Finally Found Someone
2001	"Sad City"	—	I Finally Found Someone
2003	"I Want My Money Back"	33	I Want My Money Back
2003	"I've Never Been Anywhere"	58	I Want My Money Back
2003	"Beer, Bait and Ammo"	—	I Want My Money Back
2006	"Tennessee Girl"	43	Honky Tonk Boots
2006	"Baby's Got Her Blue Jeans On"	—	Honky Tonk Boots
2008	"Real People"	—	Non-album single
2010	"Better Than I Used to Be"	—	Better Than I Used to Be
2010	"The Snow White Rows of Arlington"	—	Better Than I Used to Be
2013	"All in the Same Boat" (with Joe Diffie and Aaron Tippin)	—	All in the Same Boat
2013	"The Route That I Took"	—	Do You Know Me: A Tribute to George Jones
2014	"Can't Put My Finger on It"	—	Big Hits: Volume One
2014	"Oklahoma"	—	Non-album singles
2015	"Say Something"	—	Non-album singles
2020	"My Friend Fred"	—	Non-album singles
2021	"Evangeline"	—	Non-album singles
"—" denotes releases that did not chart

=== As featured artist ===
Year	Single	Peak positions	Album
Year	Single	US Country	Album
1994	"Never Bit a Bullet Like This" (George Jones featuring Sammy Kershaw)	52	High-Tech Redneck

== Music videos ==
Year	Title	Director
1991	"Cadillac Style"	Steve Boyle
1992	"Don't Go Near the Water"	Steve Boyle
1992	"Yard Sale"	Mary M. Matthews
1992	"Anywhere but Here"	Matthews/Smith
1993	"Haunted Heart"	Michael Merriman
1993	"Queen of My Double Wide Trailer"	Michael Merriman
1994	"National Working Woman's Holiday"	Michael Merriman
1994	"Third Rate Romance"	Michael Merriman
1994	"Christmas Time's A-Comin'"	Michael Merriman
1995	"Southbound"	Michael Merriman
1995	"Fire and Rain"	John Carlin, Richie Vetter
1995	"Your Tattoo"	Michael Merriman
1996	"Meant to Be"	Michael Salomon
1996	"Vidalia"	Michael Merriman
1996	"Politics, Religion and Her"	Michael Merriman
1997	"Love of My Life"	Michael Salomon
1998	"Matches"	Deaton Flanigen
1998	"One Day Left to Live"	Michael Salomon
1999	"Maybe Not Tonight" (with Lorrie Morgan)	Steven Goldmann
1999	"When You Love Someone"	Charley Randazzo
2006	"Baby's Got Her Blue Jeans On"	Bob E. Karate
2008	"Real People"	Eddie Bodin/Sammy Kershaw
2010	"Better Than I Used to Be"	
2013	"All in the Same Boat" (with Aaron Tippin and Joe Diffie)	
2013	"The Route That I Took"	
