= The Hits Chapter 1 (Sammy Kershaw album) =

Greatest hits album by Sammy Kershaw
- Released: September 12, 1995
- Recorded: 1991–1995
- Genre: Country
- Length: 37:25
- Label: Mercury Nashville
- Producer: Buddy Cannon, Norro Wilson

Sammy Kershaw chronology
Christmas Time's A-Comin' (1994)	The Hits Chapter 1 (1995)	Politics, Religion and Her (1996)

Professional ratings
Review scores
Source	Rating
AllMusic	4.5/5 stars

The Hits Chapter 1 is the first greatest hits album released by American country music artist Sammy Kershaw. It was issued in 1995 (see 1995 in country music) on the Mercury Records label. The album comprises the ten greatest hits from his first three studio albums: four each from 1991's Don't Go Near the Water and 1993's Haunted Heart, plus two more from 1994's Feelin' Good Train. Also included are "Still Lovin' You" (the third track from Haunted Heart, never released as a single) and the new track "Your Tattoo", which was released as a single in 1995 and peaked at #47 on the country charts. The Hits Chapter 1 earned a gold certification from the RIAA for shipping 500,000 copies in the United States on September 8, 1997.

== Track listing ==
No.	Title	Writer(s)	Length
1.	"Cadillac Style"	Mark Petersen	2:54
2.	"Don't Go Near the Water"	Chapin Hartford, Jim Foster	3:04
3.	"Yard Sale"	Larry Bastian, DeWayne Blackwell	3:28
4.	"Anywhere but Here"	Buddy Cannon, John Scott Sherrill, Bob DiPiero	2:29
5.	"She Don't Know She's Beautiful"	Bob McDill, Paul Harrison	2:54
6.	"Haunted Heart"	Buddy Brock, Kim Williams	2:46
7.	"Queen of My Double Wide Trailer"	Dennis Linde	3:31
8.	"I Can't Reach Her Anymore"	Petersen, Bruce Theien	3:09
9.	"National Working Woman's Holiday"	Roger Murrah, Pat Terry, James Dean Hicks	3:21
10.	"Third Rate Romance"	Russell Smith	3:21
11.	"Your Tattoo"	Kostas, Jack Tempchin	2:22
12.	"Still Lovin' You"	Rock Killough	4:05

== Charts ==
Chart (1995)	Peak position
U.S. Billboard 200	131
U.S. Billboard Top Country Albums	19

== Certification ==
Region	Certification	Certified units/sales
United States (RIAA)	Gold	500,000^{^}
^{^} Shipments figures based on certification alone.
