= The Hits Chapter 2 =

Greatest hits album by Sammy Kershaw
- Released: May 15, 2001
- Genre: Country
- Length: 43:36
- Label: Mercury Nashville
- Producer: Various

Sammy Kershaw chronology
I Finally Found Someone (2001)	The Hits Chapter 2 (2001)	I Want My Money Back (2003)

Professional ratings
Review scores
Source	Rating
Allmusic	4/5 stars

The Hits Chapter 2 is the second greatest hits album released by American country music artist Sammy Kershaw. The counterpart to his 1995 album The Hits Chapter 1, it features eleven of the greatest hits from his fourth through sixth albums. No new material was recorded for this album.

== Track listing ==
No.	Title	Writer(s)	Length
1.	"Love of My Life"	Keith Stegall, Dan Hill	4:25
2.	"Vidalia"	Tim Nichols, Mark D. Sanders	3:22
3.	"Politics, Religion and Her"	Byron Hill, Tony Martin	3:20
4.	"Matches"	Skip Ewing, Mark Alan Springer	3:56
5.	"Louisiana Hot Sauce"	Kershaw, Stegall	4:06
6.	"Maybe Not Tonight" (duet with Lorrie Morgan)	Stegall, D. Hill	4:10
7.	"Meant to Be"	Rick Bowles, Chris Waters	3:46
8.	"Southbound"	Mac McAnally	4:31
9.	"Me and Maxine"	Gordon Bradberry, Michael Lunn	3:48
10.	"When You Love Someone"	Stegall, D. Hill	4:16
11.	"Honky Tonk America"	Bob McDill	3:56
