= Covers the Hits =

Compilation album by Sammy Kershaw
- Released: June 20, 2000
- Genre: Country
- Length: 47:13
- Label: Mercury Nashville
- Producer: Various

Sammy Kershaw chronology
Maybe Not Tonight (1999)	Covers the Hits (2000)	I Finally Found Someone (2001)

Professional ratings
Review scores
Source	Rating
Allmusic	3/5 stars

Covers the Hits is an album released in 2000 by American country music artist Sammy Kershaw. It is composed of ten cover songs, most of which were reprised from various tribute albums to which Kershaw contributed. Some of the material had been recorded by Kershaw on his studio albums, including "Third Rate Romance", a Top 5 hit for him in 1994. The final track, "Little Bit More", was unreleased, and was recorded by Kershaw during the sessions for his 1997 album Labor of Love.

== Track listing ==
"Third Rate Romance", "More Than I Can Say", "Chevy Van", and "Memphis, Tennessee" had been recorded by Kershaw on previous studio albums.

Track	Song title	Writer(s)	Original artist	Source of cover	Length
1	"Third Rate Romance"	Russell Smith	Amazing Rhythm Aces	Feelin' Good Train	3:21
2	"More Than I Can Say"	Jerry Allison, Sonny Curtis	Leo Sayer	Maybe Not Tonight	4:23
3	"If I Fell"	John Lennon, Paul McCartney	The Beatles	Come Together: America Salutes The Beatles	2:55
4	"Chevy Van"	Sammy Johns	Sammy Johns	Politics, Religion and Her	3:42
5	"Fire and Rain"	James Taylor	James Taylor	Red Hot + Country	4:45
6	"Memphis, Tennessee"	Chuck Berry	Chuck Berry	Politics, Religion and Her	2:56
7	"Angie"	Mick Jagger, Keith Richards	The Rolling Stones	Stone Country: Country Artists Perform the Songs of the Rolling Stones	4:45
8	"I Got a Name"	Jim Croce	Jim Croce	Jim Croce: A Nashville Tribute	3:30
9	"I Know a Little"	Steve Gaines	Lynyrd Skynyrd	Skynyrd Frynds	3:32
10	"A Little Bit More"	Bobby Gosh	Dr. Hook	Previously unreleased	3:41

== Production ==
- Buddy Cannon and Norro Wilson (tracks 1, 4)
- Keith Stegall (tracks 2, 6, 7, 10)
- Jerry Crutchfield, Martin Crutchfield (track 3)
- Buddy Cannon, Norro Wilson, Sammy Kershaw (tracks 5, 9)
- Keith Stegall, Ira Antelis (track 8)
