= Don't Go Near the Water =

Don't Go Near the Water may refer to:

- Don't Go Near the Water (novel), a 1956 novel by William Brinkley
- Don't Go Near the Water (film), a 1957 film adaptation of the novel, starring Glenn Ford
- Don't Go Near the Water (album), a 1991 album by Sammy Kershaw
  - "Don't Go Near the Water" (Sammy Kershaw song), the title song
- "Don't Go Near the Water" (Beach Boys song)
- "Don't Go Near the Water", a song by Johnny Cash from Ragged Old Flag
