= Christmas Time's A-Comin' =

Song written by Benjamin "Tex" Logan

"Christmas Time's A‑Comin'"

Song by Bill Monroe and the Blue Grass Boys
- Released: 1951
- Recorded: 1951
- Genre: Bluegrass; country
- Songwriter: Benjamin "Tex" Logan

"Christmas Time's A‑Comin'"

Song by Sammy Kershaw

from the album Christmas Time's A‑Comin'
- Released: October 4, 1994
- Genre: Bluegrass; country
- Length: 3:17
- Label: Mercury Nashville
- Songwriter: Benjamin "Tex" Logan
- Producers: Buddy Cannon; Norro Wilson

"Christmas Time's A-Comin'" is a popular bluegrass Christmas standard song written by Bell Labs engineer Benjamin "Tex" Logan based on the 19th century folk tune "Skip to My Lou."

Originally recorded by Bill Monroe in 1951, the song was covered in 1994 by American country music singer Sammy Kershaw on his album of the same name, charting in 1995 and 1998 on the Billboard country charts, respectively reaching #50 and #53 those years.

== Covers ==
The song has also been recorded by (among others):

- Johnny Cash, The Johnny Cash Family Christmas, 1972
- Emmylou Harris, Light of the Stable, 1979
- Raffi, Raffi's Christmas Album, 1983
- Jerry Garcia Acoustic Band, "Christmas Time's A-Comin'", 1987 (single release)
- Peter Rowan, Sugar Plums: Holiday Treats From Sugar Hill, 1993 (compilation album only?)
- Sammy Kershaw, Christmas Time's A-Comin', 1994
- The Waltons cast, A Walton's Christmas: Together Again, 1999
- Patty Loveless, Bluegrass & White Snow: A Mountain Christmas, 2002
- Rhonda Vincent, Beautiful Star: A Christmas Collection, 2006
- Diamond Rio, A Diamond Rio Christmas: The Star Still Shines, 2007
- Charlie Daniels with The Grascals, Joy to the World: A Bluegrass Christmas, 2009
- The Oak Ridge Boys, Christmas Time's A-Coming, 2012
- The Good Lovelies, Christmas Time's A-Comin, 2020 (single release)
- Brad Paisley, Snow Globe Town, 2025
