= Stacey Earle =

American singer-songwriter

- Born: Stacey Carole Earle; September 25, 1960 (age 66); Lake Charles, Louisiana, U.S.
- Genres: Americana; folk; country
- Occupations: Singer-songwriter, musician
- Instruments: Vocals, guitar
- Label: Gearle Records
- Website: staceyearle.com

Stacey Carole Earle (born September 25, 1960) is an American singer-songwriter.

== Early life ==
Earle was born in Lake Charles, Louisiana, and raised in San Antonio, Texas. She first taught herself to play a ukulele and then began playing a gut string guitar, left behind by her musician brother, Steve Earle. She was given her own guitar as a Christmas present when she was 16 years old, but became a mother at 17 and played and sang at home, developing her own style of finger picking.

== Career ==
When she was 29 years old, Earle moved to Nashville to live with her brother Steve, and sang backing vocals and played rhythm guitar on his 1991 album The Hard Way, and for the subsequent world tour. She appeared on her brother's subsequent albums: Shut Up and Die Like an Aviator and Transcendental Blues.

After returning from tour, she wrote songs and performed them at writer's nights in Nashville. Later, she set up her own songwriters' night to get some more time on stage. During this time, she met fellow guitarist and singer Mark Stuart who became her partner in running the events and then later became her second husband.

Earle signed a contract with Nashville's Ten Ten Music Group as a staff songwriter and received notice for her song "For Years", which appeared on Sammy Kershaw's 1996 CD Politics, Religion and Her.

In 1998 she released the album Simple Gearle which later appeared on The New York Times "Favorite CD's You Nearly Missed" list. Reviewer Jon Pareles stated: "On an album completed in four days, Stacey Earle's songs came out homespun and pristine. She examines marriage, divorce and starting over in quiet, folky vignettes full of tears and determination."

== Discography ==
=== Stacey Earle and Mark Stuart ===
- Must Be Live (2001, Gearle Records), a double live album
- Never Gonna Let You Go (2003, Gearle/Evolver)
- S&M Communion Bread (2005, Gearle/Funzalo)
- Town Square (2008, Gearle Records)

=== Stacey Earle solo ===
- Simple Gearle (1998, Gearle Records)
- Dancin' With Them That Brung Me (2000, Gearle Records)

=== Mark Stuart solo ===
- Songs from a Corner Stage (1999, Gearle Records)
- Left of Nashville (2007, Gearle Records)
