= Christmas Time's A-Comin' (album) =

Studio album by Sammy Kershaw
- Released: October 4, 1994
- Genre: Christmas, country
- Length: 33:21
- Label: Mercury Nashville
- Producer: Buddy Cannon, Norro Wilson

Sammy Kershaw chronology
Feelin' Good Train (1994)	Christmas Time's A-Comin' (1994)	The Hits Chapter 1 (1995)

Professional ratings
Review scores
Source	Rating
Allmusic	3/5 stars

Christmas Time's A-Comin' is an album of Christmas music released in late 1994 by American country music singer Sammy Kershaw. His first seasonal project, it comprises a mix of traditional songs and newly recorded material. The title track, a bluegrass holiday standard written by Benjamin "Tex" Logan, charted in 1995 and 1998 on the Billboard country charts, respectively reaching #50 and #53 in those years.

== Track listing ==
1. "We Three Kings (Part 1)" (John Henry Hopkins) – 0:53
2. "Christmas Time's A-Comin'" (Tex Logan) – 3:17
3. "White Christmas" (Irving Berlin) – 4:23
4. "Please Come Home for Christmas" (Charles Brown, Gene Redd) – 2:50
5. "Rudolph the Red-Nosed Reindeer" (Johnny Marks) – 2:35
6. "Frosty the Snowman" (Walter Rollins, Steve Nelson) – 2:47
7. "Daddy Stuff" (Rock Killough) – 3:59
8. "Winter Wonderland" (Felix Bernard, Dick Smith) – 2:01
9. "All I Want for Christmas Is You" (Troy Powers, Andy Stone) – 3:37
10. "Christmas Won't Be Christmas (Without You Here)" (Steven D. Cohen, Rick Lagneaux) – 3:36
11. "Up on the House Top" (Benjamin Hanby) - 2:26
  - duet with daughter Erin
12. "We Three Kings (Part 2)" (Hopkins) – 0:57

== Personnel ==
From liner notes.

Musicians

- Mike Chapman - bass guitar
- Charles Cochran - keyboards
- Sonny Garrish - steel guitar
- Rob Hajacos - fiddle
- Michael Haynes - horns
- Sammy Kershaw - lead vocals
- Paul Leim - drums
- Sam Levine - clarinet
- Douglas Moffett - horns
- Farrell Morris - percussion
- Nashville String Machine - strings
- William Puett - horns
- Danny Parks - acoustic guitar
- Don Sheffield - horns
- Dennis Solee - horns
- Wayne Toups - accordion
- Pete Wade - gut string guitar
- Reggie Young - electric guitar

Backing vocalists

- Tracks 3, 4, 7, 9: Kim Fleming, Jana King, Lisa Silver, Louis Nunley, Bergen White
- Tracks 2, 5, 6, 8, 10, 11: Cindy Walker, Dennis Wilson, Curtis Young

Technical

- Buddy Cannon and Norro Wilson - production
- Charles Cochran - string arrangement
- Ronnie Thomas - digital editing
- Bergen White - horn arrangement (track 4), vocal arrangement (tracks 3, 4, 7, 9)
- Hank Williams - mastering

== Chart performance ==
Chart (1994)	Peak position
U.S. Billboard Top Country Albums	52
