= Come Together: America Salutes the Beatles =

Come Together: America Salutes The Beatles

Compilation album by Various artists
- Released: April 1995
- Genre: Country
- Length: 55:31
- Label: Liberty
- Producer: Jerry Crutchfield (also exec.); Martin Crutchfield; Kyle Lehning; Michael Omartian; Jimmie Lee Sloas; Don Was

Professional ratings
Review scores
Source	Rating
Allmusic	2/5 stars

Come Together: America Salutes The Beatles is a tribute album to The Beatles. Released in April 1995 (see 1995 in country music) on Liberty Records, the album features covers of various Beatles songs, as performed by country music artists. The album cover features artwork by the late John Lennon.

== Content ==
Steve Wariner's cover of "Get Back" charted at number 72 on Hot Country Songs in 1995. Sammy Kershaw's cover of "If I Fell" later appeared on his 2000 compilation Covers the Hits.

== Track listing ==
All tracks are written by John Lennon and Paul McCartney, except "Something" by George Harrison.

No.	Title	Performer(s)	Length
1.	"I'll Follow the Sun"	David Ball	2:43
2.	"Something"	Tanya Tucker	3:17
3.	"One After 909"	Willie Nelson	2:48
4.	"The Long and Winding Road"	John Berry	3:51
5.	"Come Together"	Delbert McClinton	4:04
6.	"If I Fell"	Sammy Kershaw	2:55
7.	"Let It Be"	Collin Raye	4:13
8.	"We Can Work It Out"	Phil Keaggy and PFR	3:56
9.	"Yesterday"	Billy Dean	3:37
10.	"Can't Buy Me Love"	Shenandoah	2:23
11.	"Nowhere Man"	Randy Travis	3:06
12.	"Oh! Darling"	Huey Lewis	3:36
13.	"Help!"	Little Texas	2:16
14.	"In My Life"	Susan Ashton and Gary Chapman	3:01
15.	"Get Back"	Steve Wariner	3:44
16.	"All My Loving"	Suzy Bogguss and Chet Atkins	3:52
17.	"Paperback Writer"	Kris Kristofferson	2:27

== Personnel ==
Per liner notes.

Technical

- Jerry Crutchfield — production (all tracks except 3, 8, 11, 14), executive production
- Martin Crutchfield — production (all tracks except 3, 8, 11, 14)
- Kyle Lehning — production (track 11)
- Michael Omartian — production (track 14)
- Jimmie Lee Sloas — production (track 8)
- Don Was — production (track 3)

== Chart performance ==
Chart (1995)	Peak position
U.S. Billboard Top Country Albums	13
U.S. Billboard 200	90
Canadian RPM Country Albums	5
