= Bluegrass & White Snow: A Mountain Christmas =

Bluegrass & White Snow

Studio album by Patty Loveless
- Released: October 29, 2002
- Studios: Hound's Ear Studio and Sound Kitchen (Franklin, Tennessee)
- Genre: Country / Christmas
- Length: 39:52
- Label: Epic
- Producer: Emory Gordy Jr.

Patty Loveless chronology
Mountain Soul (2001)	Bluegrass & White Snow (2002)	On Your Way Home (2003)

Professional ratings
Review scores
Source	Rating
About.com	4.5/5 stars
Allmusic	3/5 stars
The Austin Chronicle	(favorable)
Entertainment Weekly	A−

Bluegrass & White Snow: A Mountain Christmas is the twelfth album of original recordings by country music artist Patty Loveless. The first half of the album comprises covers of well-known traditional Christmas tunes. There are new renditions of the familiar "Silver Bells" and "Christmas Time's a-Coming." There are also three new tunes, all co-written by Loveless and her producer-husband Emory Gordy Jr.: "Santa Train," "Christmas Day at My House," and "Bluegrass, White Snow," the latter of which is supported by vocals from Dolly Parton and Ricky Skaggs. There is an instrumental track on the album, "Carol of the Bells." (This would be the only track on a Patty Loveless album on which Loveless herself is absent.) The album rose as high as #20 on the Billboard Top Country albums chart.

== Track listing ==
1. "Away in a Manger" (Traditional) – 2:50
2. "Silent Night" (Josef Mohr, Franz Gruber) – 3:14
3. "Joy to the World" [with Jon Randall] (George Frideric Handel, Isaac Watts, Lowell Mason) – 2:12
4. "Carol of the Bells" [instrumental] (Mykola Dmytrovych Leontovych, Peter Wilhousky) – 2:36
5. "The First Noel" (Traditional) – 2:17
6. "Little Drummer Boy" [with Rebecca Lynn Howard] (Katherine K. Davis, Henry Onorati, Harry Simeone) – 3:54
7. "Silver Bells" (Jay Livingston, Ray Evans) – 3:21
8. "O Little Town of Bethlehem" (Phillips Brooks, Lewis H. Redner) – 3:46
9. "Christmas Time's A-Comin'" (Tex Logan) – 3:36
10. "Santa Train" (Patty Loveless, Emory Gordy Jr.) – 2:58
11. "Christmas Day at My House" (Loveless, Gordy Jr.) – 2:25
12. "Beautiful Star of Bethlehem" (Arthur Leroy Phipps) – 3:22
13. "Bluegrass, White Snow" (Loveless, Gordy Jr.) – 3:21

== Personnel ==
Musicians

- Patty Loveless – vocals (1-3, 5-13), sleigh bells (9), train whistle (10)
- Biff Watson – guitar (1, 2, 6), high-string guitar (6, 7, 13), baritone guitar (8)
- Rob Ickes – dobro (3, 7, 10)
- Alan O'Bryant – banjo (11)
- Steve Gibson – mandola (1, 2), guitar (6-8), banjo, bouzouki (6), percussion
- Stuart Duncan – mandolin (1, 6, 8), fiddle (1, 2, 7, 8, 12, 13), octave mandolin (3), mandocello (6), lead fiddle (11)
- Jon Randall – mandolin (3, 12), vocals (3, 12)
- Vince Gill – mandolin (7), backing vocals (7)
- Tim Hensley – mandolin (9-11), backing vocals (9-11)
- Ricky Skaggs – mandolin (13), backing vocals (13)
- Emory Gordy Jr. – Ernie Ball bass (1, 2, 6-8, 10), guitar (3, 6, 9-13)
- Blake Williams – bass (3, 9, 11-13), banjo (9, 10)
- Butch Lee – wind chimes (4, 6, 7), bass drum (6), bells (6), wine glasses (7), percussion (10, 13), sleigh bells (11), dobro (12), banjo (13)
- Virgie Lee – chimes (4)
- Jim Horn – recorder (6)
- Deanie Richardson – lead fiddle (9), mandolin (10), fiddle (10), harmony fiddle (11)
- Carmella Ramsey – harmony fiddle (9), backing vocals (9-12)
- Claire Lynch – backing vocals (2, 5)
- Trisha Yearwood – backing vocals (2, 5)
- Emmylou Harris – backing vocals (3)
- Rebecca Lynn Howard – vocals (6)
- Amy Grant – backing vocals (7)
- Dolly Parton – backing vocals (13)

Nashville Mandolin Ensemble (Tracks 4 & 5)

- Gene Ford – guitar
- John Hedgecoth – mandocello
- Charlie Derrington – mandola
- Butch Baldassari – mandolin
- Todd Cerney – mandolin
- Stephan Dudash – mandolin
- Rob Haines – mandolin
- Van Manakas – mandolin
- Bruce Sweetman – mandolin
- David Spicher – bass

Production

- Anthony S. Martin – A&R direction
- Emory Gordy Jr. – producer, arrangements (1-3, 5, 8)
- Paul Zonn – arrangements (4, 5)
- Nashville Mandolin Ensemble – arrangements (4, 5)
- Justin Niebank – recording, mixing
- J.C. Monterrosa – recording assistant, mix assistant
- Jim DeMain – mastering at Yes Master (Nashville, Tennessee)
- Lauren Koch – music contractor
- Tonya Derry – A&R coordinator
- Kay Smith – A&R coordinator
- Victoria Russell – creative production
- Russ Harrington – photography
- Deb Haus – art direction, artist development
- Beth Kindig – art direction, design
- Debra Wingo – make-up, hair stylist
- Claudia Fowler – stylist
- Mike Robertson – management

== Chart performance ==
Chart (2002)	Peak position
U.S. Billboard Top Bluegrass Albums	2
U.S. Billboard Top Country Albums	20
U.S. Billboard 200	172
U.S. Billboard Top Holiday Albums	41
