= Skynyrd Frynds =

Compilation album by Various artists
- Released: October 1994
- Genre: Country rock, Southern rock
- Length: 51:59
- Label: MCA
- Producer: Barry Beckett; Gregg Brown; Tony Brown; Buddy Cannon; Don Cook; Charlie Daniels; Ron W. Griffin; Sammy Kershaw; Josh Leo; Jim Ed Norman; Don Potter; Hank Williams Jr.; Norro Wilson

Skynyrd Frynds is a tribute album to the American Southern rock band Lynyrd Skynyrd, released in 1994 on MCA Records. It features cover versions of ten Lynyrd Skynyrd songs, as performed by various country music artists. The album reached #8 on Top Country Albums upon its release. The album was executive produced by Gary Rossington.

== Content ==
The album was executive-produced by Lynyrd Skynyrd member Gary Rossington. Alabama's rendition of "Sweet Home Alabama" includes a rewritten verse, which omits the references to Watergate and George Wallace. Wynonna's rendition of "Free Bird" was later included on her 1996 album Revelations, and Sammy Kershaw's "I Know a Little" was later included on his 2000 album Covers the Hits. Confederate Railroad's version of "Simple Man" also appeared on the band's 1998 album Keep On Rockin'. "Tuesday's Gone" by Hank Williams Jr. was originally included on his 1988 album Wild Streak.

=== Critical reception ===
Giving it three stars out of five, Allmusic reviewer William Ruhlmann said, "For the most part, those performers display a knowledge of Lynyrd Skynyrd's work and an affection for it." He cited Travis Tritt's, Sammy Kershaw's and Steve Earle's performance as the strongest on the album, but called Alabama's "Sweet Home Alabama" cover "gimmicky" and said of Wynonna's "Free Bird" that she "ends up undercutting its power." Washington City Paper critic Dave McKenna gave a mostly favorable review, saying "the country stars on Frynds don't hide their reverence and affection for the material or its creators," but criticizing the album for not showing the band's "lighter side."

== Track listing ==
No.	Title	Performer(s)	Length
1.	"Sweet Home Alabama"	Alabama	6:44
2.	"Don't Ask Me No Questions"	Travis Tritt	4:36
3.	"Simple Man"	Confederate Railroad	5:44
4.	"I Know a Little"	Sammy Kershaw	3:32
5.	"Tuesday's Gone"	Hank Williams Jr.	5:48
6.	"Call Me the Breeze"	The Mavericks	4:13
7.	"What's Your Name?"	Steve Earle	3:49
8.	"One More Time"	Charlie Daniels	4:35
9.	"Saturday Night Special"	McBride & the Ride	5:18
10.	"Free Bird"	Wynonna Judd	7:41

== Chart performance ==
=== Albums ===
Chart (1994)	Peak position
U.S. Billboard Top Country Albums	8
U.S. Billboard 200	56

=== Singles ===
Year	Single	Artist	Peak positions
Year	Single	Artist	US Country
1994	"Sweet Home Alabama"	Alabama	75
