= Better Than I Used to Be (song) =

2010 song by Sammy Kershaw

Single by Sammy Kershaw

from the album Better Than I Used to Be
- Released: March 30, 2010
- Genre: Country
- Length: 3:20
- Label: Big Hit
- Songwriters: Ashley Gorley; Bryan Simpson
- Producer: Buddy Cannon

Sammy Kershaw singles chronology
"Real People" (2008)	"Better Than I Used to Be" (2010)	"The Snow White Rows of Arlington" (2010)

"Better Than I Used to Be" is a song written by Ashley Gorley and Bryan Simpson. The song was originally recorded by American country music artist Sammy Kershaw in 2010 for the album of the same name, released August 31, 2010, on Big Hit Records. The version released by Sammy Kershaw was released as a single, but did not enter the charts.

== Tim McGraw version ==
"Better Than I Used to Be"

Single by Tim McGraw

from the album Emotional Traffic
- Released: November 28, 2011
- Genre: Country
- Length: 3:22
- Label: Curb
- Songwriters: Ashley Gorley; Bryan Simpson
- Producers: Byron Gallimore; Tim McGraw

Tim McGraw singles chronology
"Me and Tennessee" (2011)	"Better Than I Used to Be" (2011)	"Feel Like a Rock Star" (2012)

The song was later covered by Tim McGraw in 2011 and was released to iTunes and country radio on December 1, 2011, via Curb Records. The song served as the first single for his final Curb album, Emotional Traffic, which was released on January 24, 2012.

== Critical reception ==
Giving McGraw's version four stars out of five, Taste of Country reviewer Billy Dukes said, "It's the first time fans get to experience many of the burdens the singer has talked of shedding in recent years." Matt Bjorke of Roughstock was positive, calling it "a strong story song from a mature singer/songwriter." He went on to say that it was McGraw's "most country song to date with strong lyrical imagery and one of Tim’s best vocal performances in years." Kevin John Coyne of Country Universe gave it a 'B+', calling the song "classic McGraw" and saying that the production is, "clean, tasteful, and decidedly country."

== Chart performance ==
McGraw's version of the song debuted at number 51 on the U.S. Billboard Hot Country Songs chart for the week of December 17, 2011. It also debuted at number 81 on the U.S. Billboard Hot 100 chart for the week of December 31, 2011. It also debuted at number 71 on the Canadian Hot 100 chart for the week of February 11, 2012.

Chart (2011–2012)	Peak position
Canada Country (Billboard)	2
Canada Hot 100 (Billboard)	71
US Billboard Hot 100	52
US Hot Country Songs (Billboard)	5

=== Year-end charts ===
Chart (2012)	Position
US Country Songs (Billboard)	6

=== Certifications ===
Region	Certification	Certified units/sales
United States (RIAA)	Platinum	1,000,000^{‡}
^{‡} Sales+streaming figures based on certification alone.
