= Simple Gearle =

Studio album by Stacey Earle
- Released: February 9, 1999
- Genre: Country
- Length: 53:25
- Label: Gearle Records
- Producer: Stacey Earle & The Jewels

Stacey Earle chronology
Simple Gearle (1999)	Dancin' With Them That Brung Me (2000)

Professional ratings
Review scores
Source	Rating
Allmusic	4/5 stars

Simple Gearle is the debut solo album by Stacey Earle, released independently through Gearle Records. The back of the CD booklet lists the songs as if there were two sides, like on an old LP.

== Track listing ==
All tracks are written by Stacey Earle, except track 7, written by Stacey Earle, Jack Earle & Kathleen Haskard

Side A
No.	Title	Length
1.	"Waiting"	1:49
2.	"Wedding Night"	4:20
3.	"Tears That She Cries"	5:21
4.	"Next Door Down"	4:35
5.	"Silly You (Dear Sweet Peggy)"	4:22
6.	"Simple Gearle"	2:30
7.	"Losers Weep" (with Steve Earle)	4:58

Side B
No.	Title	Length
8.	"Cried My Heart Out"	4:23
9.	"Weekend Runaways"	3:30
10.	"Show Me How"	3:23
11.	"If It Weren't For You"	4:46
12.	"In My Way (For Frances)"	5:00
13.	"Just Another Day"	4:28
Total length:		53:25

== Musicians ==
- Stacey Earle: Vocals, Acoustic Guitar
- Band: The Jewels (Michael Webb, John Gardener, Mark Prentice & Mark Stuart
- Steve Earle: Harmony Vocals on track 7
- Michael Webb: Accordion, Melodica, Mandolin
- John Gardener: Drums, Percussion
- Mark Prentice: Electric Bass, Fretless Bass, Upright Bass
- Mark Stuart: Vocals, Acoustic Guitar
- Andrea Zonn: Viola on track 13

== Production ==
- Stacey Earle & The Jewels: Producers
- Paul Freeman: Assistant
- Gena Kennedy: Graphic Design
- Nathan Smith: Engineer, Mixing Engineer
- Eric Wolf: Mastering

All track information and credits were taken from the CD liner notes.
