= I Finally Found Someone (album) =

2001 studio album by Lorrie Morgan and Sammy Kershaw

Studio album by Lorrie Morgan and Sammy Kershaw
- Released: April 17, 2001
- Genre: Country
- Label: RCA Nashville
- Producers: Brian Tankersley, Norro Wilson

Lorrie Morgan chronology
To Get to You: Greatest Hits Collection (2000)	I Finally Found Someone (2001)	Show Me How (2004)

Sammy Kershaw chronology
Covers the Hits (2000)	I Finally Found Someone (2001)	The Hits Chapter 2 (2001)

Professional ratings
Review scores
Source	Rating
About.com	(favorable)
AllMusic	2.5/5 stars
Billboard	(favorable)
Country Standard Time	(positive)
Country Weekly	(average)
Entertainment Weekly	C−

I Finally Found Someone is a duet studio album by American country music artists Lorrie Morgan and Sammy Kershaw. It was released in 2001 by RCA Records Nashville and it is largely composed of duets between the two artists. Six of the songs are duets, while the other six are solo efforts (three from each artist). The only chart single from this album was "He Drinks Tequila", one of the duets, which peaked at No. 39 on the Billboard country chart. The title track is a cover of the Barbra Streisand/Bryan Adams duet. "What a Wonderful World", a cover of a song made famous by Louis Armstrong, is also included here.

== Track listing ==
No.	Title	Writer(s)	Performer	Length
1.	"I Finally Found Someone"	Barbra Streisand, Bryan Adams, Marvin Hamlisch, Robert John "Mutt" Lange	Lorrie Morgan and Sammy Kershaw	3:35
2.	"Big Time"	Jim Collins, Leslie Satcher	Lorrie Morgan	3:01
3.	"I Can't Think of Anything but You"	Skip Ewing, David Feritta, Alan Rich	Lorrie Morgan with Sammy Kershaw	3:20
4.	"Be My Reason"	Dale Dodson, Billy Lawson, John Northrup	Lorrie Morgan with Sammy Kershaw	3:45
5.	"29 Again"	Dave Berg, Deanna Bryant, Rivers Rutherford	Lorrie Morgan	3:30
6.	"He Drinks Tequila"	Shawn Camp, Michele McCord	Lorrie Morgan with Sammy Kershaw	3:09
7.	"What a Wonderful World"	Bob Thiele, George David Weiss	Sammy Kershaw	2:39
8.	"Sad City"	Keith Burns, Mark Oliverius	Sammy Kershaw	2:43
9.	"That's Where I'll Be"	Sammy Kershaw, Lorrie Morgan	Lorrie Morgan with Sammy Kershaw	5:03
10.	"Sugar"	Kershaw	Sammy Kershaw	3:11
11.	"I Must Be Gettin' Older"	Morgan	Lorrie Morgan	4:10
12.	"3 Seconds"	Jeffrey Steele, Anthony Smith, Chris Wallin	Lorrie Morgan with Sammy Kershaw	3:35

== Personnel ==
- Mike Brignardello - bass guitar
- Shannon Brown - background vocals
- Carol Chase - background vocals
- J. T. Corenflos - electric guitar
- Angel Cruz - background vocals
- Diana DeWitt - background vocals
- Larry Franklin - fiddle, mandolin
- Sonny Garrish - steel guitar
- Kevin "Swine" Grantt - bass guitar
- Rob Hajacos - fiddle
- Steve Hermann - trumpet
- Bernie Herms - synthesizer, synthesizer strings
- Kirk "Jelly Roll" Johnson - harmonica
- Sammy Kershaw - lead vocals, background vocals
- Jeff King - electric guitar
- Paul Leim - drums, tambourine
- B. James Lowry - acoustic guitar
- Jerry McPherson - electric guitar
- Lorrie Morgan - lead vocals, background vocals
- Dale Oliver - electric guitar
- Gary Prim - keyboards, piano, synthesizer
- Brent Rowan - electric guitar
- John Wesley Ryles - background vocals
- Russell Terrell - background vocals
- Bobby Terry - acoustic guitar, electric guitar
- Biff Watson - acoustic guitar, gut string guitar
- Bergen White - synthesizer string arrangements
- Glenn Worf - bass guitar
- Reggie Young - electric guitar

== Chart performance ==
Chart (2001)	Peak position
U.S. Billboard 200	114
U.S. Billboard Top Country Albums	13
