= Better Than I Used to Be =

Studio album by Sammy Kershaw
- Released: August 31, 2010
- Genre: Country
- Length: 37:23
- Label: Big Hit Records
- Producer: Buddy Cannon

Sammy Kershaw chronology
| Honky Tonk Boots (2006) | Better Than I Used to Be (2010) | A Sammy Klaus Christmas (2012) |

Singles from Better Than I Used to Be
- 1. "Better Than I Used to Be" Released: March 30, 2010; 2. "The Snow White Rows of Arlington" Released: August 31, 2010

Better Than I Used to Be is the title of the ninth studio album by American country music artist Sammy Kershaw. The album was released on August 31, 2010 via Big Hit Records. It is produced by Buddy Cannon. Two singles were released from the album: "Better Than I Used to Be" and "The Snow White Rows of Arlington". The album, along with the two singles, failed to enter a Billboard chart.

"Saltwater Cowboy" was originally recorded by Tracy Byrd on his 2006 album Different Things. A cover song of "The Cover of the Rolling Stone" featuring Jamey Johnson was also included on the album.

A music video was made for "Better Than I Used to Be" and was directed by David Abbott. "Better Than I Used to Be" was later covered by Tim McGraw on his 2012 album Emotional Traffic.

== Critical reception ==
Better Than I Used to Be generated positive reviews overall. Giving the album three and a half stars out of five, Matt Bjorke of Roughstock said that Better Than I Used To Be finds Sammy Kershaw in a great place." and states that "with 11 strong tunes Better Than I Used To Be reminds us exactly why Sammy Kershaw is still considered one of country music’s best vocalists." Eric Banister of Country Standard Time gave a favorable review, "On his first new album in four years, Kershaw nearly lives up to the title, displaying a voice that is as strong as it has ever been."

== Track listing ==
| No. | Title | Writer(s) | Length |
|---|---|---|---|
| 1. | "That Train" | Sammy Kershaw | 2:40 |
| 2. | "Better Than I Used to Be" | Ashley Gorley, Bryan Simpson | 3:20 |
| 3. | "Saltwater Cowboy" | Ron Harbin, Phil O'Donnell, Cyril Rawson | 3:51 |
| 4. | "Everybody Wants My Girl" | Ed Hill, Billy Lawson | 3:21 |
| 5. | "Through The Eyes of a Woman" | Hill, Mark Irwin, Josh Kear | 2:45 |
| 6. | "The Snow White Rows of Arlington" | Hugh Prestwood | 4:17 |
| 7. | "I Ain't Fallin' For That" | Buddy Cannon, Billy Yates | 3:01 |
| 8. | "Like I Wasn't Even There" | Wes Hightower, Monty Criswell | 3:18 |
| 9. | "The Cover of the Rolling Stone" (featuring Jamey Johnson) | Shel Silverstein | 3:06 |
| 10. | "I See Red" | Wil Nance, Dean Dillon, Buddy Brock | 3:23 |
| 11. | "Takin' The Long Way Home" | Sammy Kershaw, John Scott Sherrill, Scotty Emerick | 4:05 |

== Personnel ==
- Wyatt Beard – background vocals
- Mark Beckett – drums
- Buddy Cannon – background vocals
- Melonie Cannon – background vocals
- Scotty Emerick – acoustic guitar
- Sonny Garrish – steel guitar, background vocals
- Kevin "Swine" Grantt – bass guitar
- Kenny Greenberg – electric guitar
- Rob Hajacos – fiddle
- Tim Hensley – background vocals
- John Hobbs – piano, Wurlitzer
- Jamey Johnson – vocals on "The Cover of the Rolling Stone"
- Sammy Kershaw – lead vocals
- Troy Lancaster – electric guitar
- Randy McCormick – Hammond B-3 organ, piano, synthesizer
- Willie McKee – background vocals
- Larry Paxton – bass guitar
- Hugh Prestwood – acoustic guitar, synthesizer
- Mickey Raphael – harmonica
- Bobby Terry – acoustic guitar
