= Donovan Chapman =

American singer-songwriter

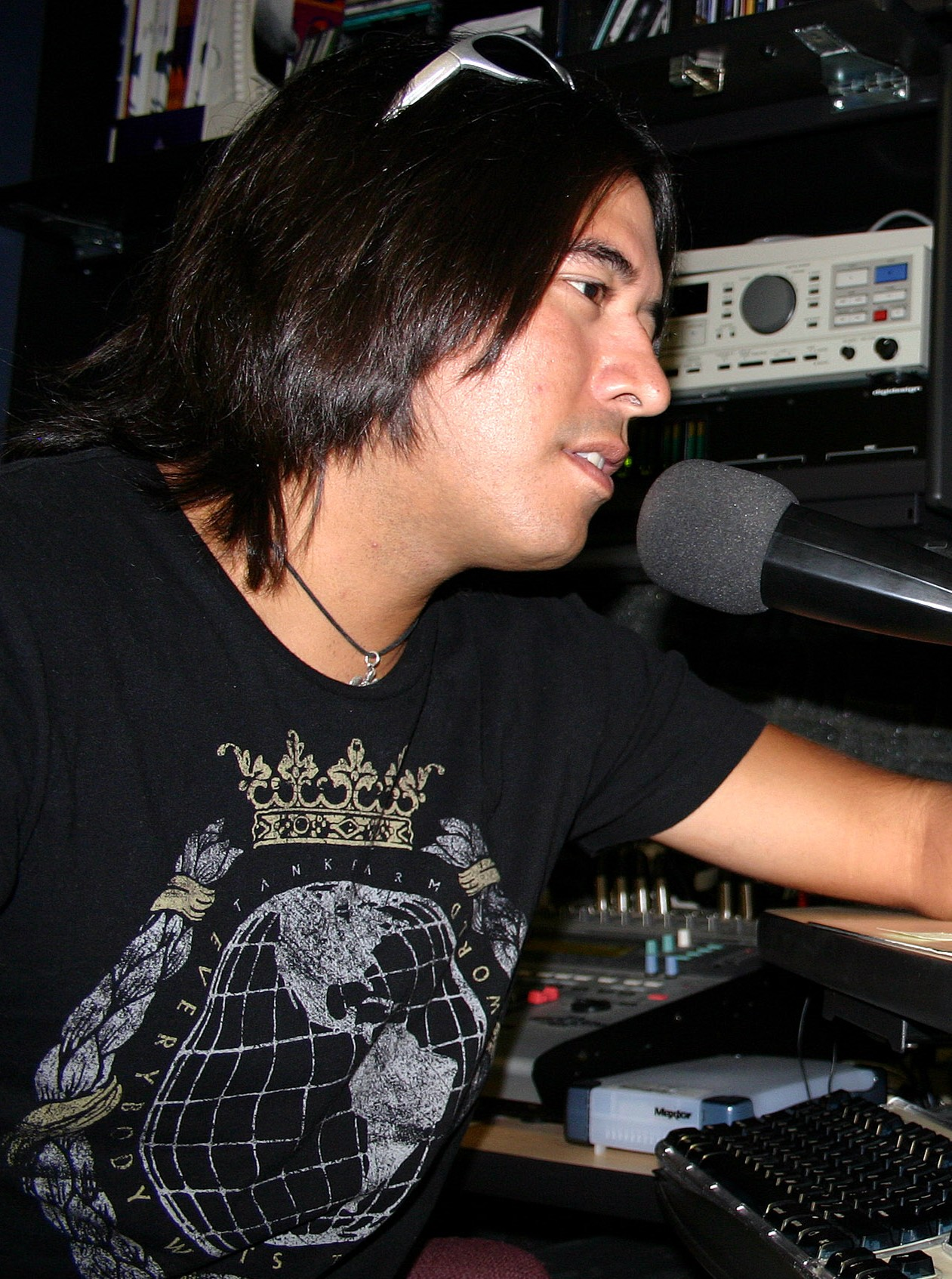

Background information
- Origin: Farmerville, Louisiana, United States
- Genres: Country
- Occupation: Singer-songwriter
- Instrument(s): Vocals guitar ukulele
- Years active: 2003–present
- Labels: Curb; Category 5

Donovan Chapman (born in Farmerville, Louisiana) is an American country music artist. he has recorded two studio albums: one on Curb Records, and one on Category 5 Records. He has also charted four singles on the Billboard Hot Country Songs charts, with his highest being the No. 42-peaking "House Like That" in late 2006-early 2007.

== Biography ==
Chapman was raised in Farmerville, Louisiana. His mother, a native of Hawaii, exposed him to Hawaiian music at an early age, and he soon learned to play the ukulele.

At age seventeen, Chapman enlisted in the United States Air Force. He spent eleven years in the Air Force, serving for five years in U.S. Air Force Security Forces and six years as a Pararescueman. During his leave time, he met Mike Curb, head of the Curb Records label, and was soon signed to the label.

Chapman's first single, "There Is No War", was released in 2003. The single was dedicated to families of American soldiers who had died overseas. Chapman recorded two albums for Curb Records, shortly before returning to duty in Afghanistan. In the same time, Chapman released a self titled EP, followed by his first full album, I Am America.

After returning to the United States, he signed to Category 5 Records. His first single for Category 5, "House Like That", was released in late 2006. A second single, "All I Need", was released in 2007, shortly before Chapman terminated his relationship with Category 5 Records. "House Like That" was produced by Billy Joe Walker, Jr.

Chapman's music career went into hiatus after he suffered from post traumatic stress disorder stemming from his service in the Air Force. After recovering, he released the album Brotherhood in late 2021.

In September 2023, Chapman released his album "Raised Old School" which has the singles "Old School and Whatcha Know About That." Blake Shelton and Craig Morgan's fiddle player, Jim Ed Hodges along with Clint Black's drummer, Andy Hull and session and touring bassist, Todd Ashburn can be seen playing in the video "Old School." The company Four Branches Bourbon also uses the song and video "Old School" in their commercials. Chapman was the opening act for Montgomery Gentry's, Eddie Montgomery all of 2023 and into 2024.

== Discography ==
=== Studio albums ===
Title	Album details
I Am America	Release date: November 14, 2006; Label: Curb Records
Brotherhood	Release date: October 29, 2021; Label: Self-released

=== Extended plays ===
Title	Album details
Donovan Chapman	Release date: August 16, 2005; Label: Curb Records

=== Singles ===
Year	Single	Peak positions	Album
Year	Single	US Country	Album
2003	"There Is No War"	58	Donovan Chapman
2004	"Hey Hollywood"	56	Donovan Chapman
2004	"Panama City"	—	Donovan Chapman
2004	"Good Problem to Have"	—	Donovan Chapman
2006	"House Like That"	42	I Am America
2007	"All I Need"	58	I Am America
"—" denotes releases that did not chart
