= Honky Tonk Boots =

Studio album by Sammy Kershaw
- Released: June 27, 2006
- Genre: Country
- Label: Category 5
- Producer: Buddy Cannon, Norro Wilson

Sammy Kershaw chronology
I Want My Money Back (2003)	Honky Tonk Boots (2006)	Better Than I Used to Be (2010)

Honky Tonk Boots is an album released in 2006 by American country music artist Sammy Kershaw. His only release for the Category 5 Records album, it was also his first studio release since 2003's I Want My Money Back. The album's lead-off single, "Tennessee Girl", peaked at number 43 on the Billboard country charts in 2006. Honky Tonk Boots also reunited him with producers Buddy Cannon and Norro Wilson, who co-produced his first four albums.

Three cover songs are included on this album. "Baby's Got Her Blue Jeans On", the second and final single, is a cover of Mel McDaniel's number one hit from his 1984 album Let It Roll. Kershaw's rendition failed to chart. "Evangeline" was previously a number 51-peaking single for Chad Brock in 1998 from his self-titled debut, which Cannon and Wilson also produced. "The Battle" was previously recorded by George Jones for his 1976 album of the same title. The single peaked at number 14.

Jeffrey B. Remz of Country Standard Time gave the album a positive review, comparing Kershaw's vocals favorably to George Jones and saying that "The Louisiana native has done his part in coming through with a meaty performance."

== Track listing ==
1. "Tennessee Girl" (Bob DiPiero, Craig Wiseman) – 3:36
2. "Honky Tonk Boots" (Scott Blackwell, Billy Don Burns) – 2:47
3. "One Step at a Time" (Tim Mensy) – 3:41
4. "Evangeline" (Bob McDill, Carson Chamberlain) – 3:35
5. "Leavin' Made Easy" (Duane Steele, Jon Robbin) – 3:27
6. "Baby's Got Her Blue Jeans On" (McDill) – 3:10
7. "High Society" (McDill, Dickey Lee) – 3:13
8. "The Battle" (Norro Wilson, George Richey, Linda Kimball) – 2:50
9. "Mama's Got a Tattoo" (Ronnie Samoset, Alan Dysert) – 3:04
10. "Cantaloupes on Mars" (Danny Mayo) – 3:04

== Personnel ==
- Harold Bradley - baritone guitar
- David Briggs - keyboards
- Buddy Cannon - background vocals
- Melonie Cannon - background vocals
- Mark Casstevens - acoustic guitar
- Mike Chapman - bass guitar
- J. T. Corenflos - electric guitar
- Stuart Duncan - fiddle
- Larry Franklin - fiddle
- Sonny Garrish - steel guitar
- Rob Hajacos - fiddle
- John Hobbs - keyboards
- Sammy Kershaw - lead vocals
- Mike Lawler - keyboards
- Paul Leim - drums
- Gordon Mote - Hammond B-3 organ, piano
- Danny Parks - acoustic guitar
- Larry Paxton - bass guitar
- Brent Rowan - electric guitar
- Hal Rugg - steel guitar
- John Wesley Ryles - background vocals
- Wayne Toups - accordion
- John Willis - acoustic guitar
- Dennis Wilson - background vocals
- Curtis Young - background vocals
- Reggie Young - electric guitar

== Chart performance ==
Chart (2006)	Peak position
U.S. Billboard Top Country Albums	56
U.S. Billboard Independent Albums	34
