= If You're Gonna Walk, I'm Gonna Crawl =

Single by Sammy Kershaw

from the album Feelin' Good Train
- B-side: "If You Ever Come This Way Again"
- Released: March 18, 1995
- Genre: Country
- Length: 2:18
- Label: Mercury
- Songwriters: Larry Bastian, Buddy Cannon
- Producers: Buddy Cannon, Norro Wilson

Sammy Kershaw singles chronology
"Southbound" (1995)	"If You're Gonna Walk, I'm Gonna Crawl" (1995)	"Your Tattoo" (1995)

"If You're Gonna Walk, I'm Gonna Crawl" is a song written by Larry Bastian and Buddy Cannon, and recorded by American country music artist Sammy Kershaw. It was released in March 1995 as the fourth single from the album Feelin' Good Train. The song reached #18 on the Billboard Hot Country Singles & Tracks chart.

== Chart performance ==
Chart (1995)	Peak position
Canada Country Singles (RPM)	15
US Hot Country Songs (Billboard)	18
