= Dancin' With Them That Brung Me =

Studio album by Stacey Earle
- Released: May 9, 2000
- Genre: Country
- Length: 43:36
- Label: Gearle Records
- Producer: Stacey Earle & Mark Stuart

Stacey Earle chronology
Simple Gearle (1998)	Dancin' With Them That Brung Me (2000)	Must Be Live (with Mark Stuart) (2001)

Professional ratings
Review scores
Source	Rating
Allmusic	4.5/5 stars

Dancin' With Them That Brung Me is the second solo album by Stacey Earle, following her 1998 release Simple Gearle, both albums released independently through Gearle Records.

== Reception ==
Michael Cusanelli of AllMusic writes "Dancin' With Them That Brung Me is one of those independent gems that the listener must find. It will not hold a premiere position in the record store or on the charts." Ellen Rawson of FemMusic states that "Earle’s first album, Simple Gearle, received adulation and earned her fans. Dancin’ with Them That Brung Me doesn't show a single sign of a sophomore slump." Alex Steininger of InMusicWeTrust writes, "Toe-tappin', emotional country with plenty of feeling and love. I'll give it an A+." Steven Stone of EnjoyTheMusic says, "If Stacey Earle were a painter her work would look like Grandma Moses. It is primitive and graphic with a familiar folksy edge."

== Track listing ==
All tracks are written by Stacey Earle, unless otherwise noted.

No.	Title	Writer(s)	Length
1.	"Promise You Anything"	Steve Earle; Maria McKee; Patrick Suggs	2:41
2.	"Is It Enough (I Luuuv You)"	Stacey Earle; Mark Stuart	3:15
3.	"Did I Say "I'm Sorry""		3:25
4.	"Makes Me Happy"		3:37
5.	"No New Shoes"		4:55
6.	"Good-By"		4:03
7.	"Kiss Her Goodnight" (with Sheryl Crow)		3:05
8.	"Wonderful Life"		3:34
9.	"Must Be Love"	Stacey Earle; George Ducas	3:20
10.	"Dancin' With Those That Brung Me"	Stacey Earle; Denise Draper	3:06
11.	"Why"		3:59
12.	"How I Ran"		4:36
Total length:			43:36

== Musicians ==
- Stacey Earle: Perty songs, vocals, acoustic guitars
- The Jewels are Mark Stuart, Kyle Mims & Michael Webb
- Mark Stuart: Acoustic guitars, backing vocals, mandolin
- Kyle Mims: Drums, percussion gadgets
- Michael Webb: Accordion, mandolin, organ, bass, vocals
- Sheryl Crow: Background vocals, harmonium, piano on track 7
- Mike Bub: Bass on tracks 1, 5 & 6
- Byron House: Bass on tracks 2, 4, 9 & 12
- Mike Daly: Lap steel on track 9

== Production ==
- Produced by: Stacey Earle, Mark Stuart
- Co-Produced by: Michael Webb
- Engineered by: Michael Webb, Mike Hopkins, Kevin Brownstein, Brian Scheuble
- Mixed by: Michael Webb, Stacey Earle, Mark Stuart
- Mastered by: Randy Kling (Disc Mastering)
- Pre-production by: Patrick Earle (Duck Tape)

All track information and credits were taken from the CD liner notes.
