= Bush Hawg =

American country music band

- Origin: Nashville, Tennessee, U.S.
- Genres: Country
- Years active: 2010-2013
- Labels: RCA Records Nashville
- Past members: Shaun Ames; Russ Caldwell; Craig Hand; Ben Helton; Jim Phipps; Alex Wilshire

Bush Hawg was an American country music band from Nashville, Tennessee. Its members were Craig Hand (lead vocals), Shaun Ames (guitar, mandolin, banjo), Russ Caldwell (guitar), Ben Helton (bass guitar, vocals), Jim Phipps (drums), and Alex Wilshire (guitar).

== Biography ==
Bush Hawg was founded in 2010 in Nashville, Tennessee. The band consisted of Craig Hand (lead vocals), Shaun Ames (guitar, mandolin, banjo), Russ Caldwell (guitar), Ben Helton (bass guitar, background vocals), Alex Wilshire (guitar), and Jim Phipps (drums). Ames and Wilshire met while working together at a gun store.

Bush Hawg was signed with RCA Records Nashville in 2011 and began touring that year as part of Armed Forces Entertainment, in addition to recording material with producer Michael Knox. Originally, Ames was the lead vocalist, but Knox's dissatisfaction with Ames's voice led to the others selecting Craig Hand instead. Hand was previously a solo artist for Category 5 Records in 2006.

The band released their debut single "Crushin'" in 2013. Taste of Country writer Billy Dukes compared Craig Hand's vocals to those of Jason Aldean but panned the song as "a generic first-timer effort that relies on a big hook instead on lyrical depth or distinctive attitude." "Crushin'" charted on Billboard Country Airplay, peaking at number 54. After the release of "Crushin'", Bush Hawg toured with Parmalee and Eric Paslay.

A second single, "More Than Corn", followed in 2014. Kevin John Coyne of Country Universe rated the song "D", criticizing its lyrics as cliché and calling it "almost adorably last decade".

== Singles ==
| Year | Single | Peak chart positions |
| Year | Single | US Country Airplay |
|---|---|---|
| 2013 | "Crushin'" | 54 |
| 2014 | "More Than Corn" | — |
