= I Want My Money Back =

Studio album by Sammy Kershaw
- Released: March 25, 2003
- Genre: Country
- Length: 39:07
- Label: Audium/Koch
- Producer: Richard Landis

Sammy Kershaw chronology
The Hits Chapter 2 (2001)	I Want My Money Back (2003)	Honky Tonk Boots (2006)

I Want My Money Back is the eighth studio album by American country music artist Sammy Kershaw, released on March 25, 2003. His first album for Audium/Koch Entertainment, it produced two singles on the Billboard country charts: the title track at #33 and "I've Never Been Anywhere" at #58.

Two songs on this album were recorded by two other artists each. "Beer, Bait and Ammo" was originally recorded by Kevin Fowler on his 2000 album of the same name, and later by Mark Chesnutt on his 2005 album Savin' the Honky Tonk. "Metropolis" was later recorded by Anthony Smith on his 2003 album If That Ain't Country, and by Trace Adkins on his 2005 album Songs About Me.

Stephen Thomas Erlewine of Allmusic called it "one of his most satisfying efforts."

== Track listing ==
No.	Title	Writer(s)	Length
1.	"I Want My Money Back"	Dave Berg, Annie Tate, Sam Tate	3:14
2.	"Miss What's Her Name"	Jason Campbell, Greg Hanna	3:18
3.	"Metropolis"	Anthony Smith, Chris Wallin	3:31
4.	"Sunday Morning on Bourbon Street"	Ward Davis, Dan Murph	3:56
5.	"Stitches"	Smith	3:43
6.	"Beer, Bait and Ammo"	Kevin Fowler	3:57
7.	"28/83 (She Ain't in It for the Love)"	Casey Beathard, Billy Currington, Carson Chamberlain	2:50
8.	"Gone for Good Goodbye"	Hugh Prestwood	3:48
9.	"I've Never Been Anywhere"	Dean Dillon, Jim Collins	3:39
10.	"The Paper Heart"	Nelson Blanchard, Scott Innes, Claude Parish	3:07
11.	"Are You Having Fun Yet?"	Dave Brainard, Campbell, Lonnie Williams	3:56

== Personnel ==
As listed in liner notes.

- Glen Duncan - fiddle
- Paul Franklin - steel guitar
- Sammy Kershaw - lead vocals
- Richard Landis - electric piano, percussion
- Paul Leim - drums
- B. James Lowry - acoustic guitar
- Brent Mason - electric guitar
- Jimmy Nichols - synthesizer, background vocals
- Dave Pomeroy - bass guitar
- Matt Rollings - piano
- John Wesley Ryles - background vocals
- Russell Terrell - background vocals
- Dennis Wilson - background vocals
- Curtis Young - background vocals

Recorded and Mixed by Tony Green

== Chart performance ==
Chart (2003)	Peak position
US Top Country Albums (Billboard)	39
US Independent Albums (Billboard)	27
