= Cadillac Style =

Single by Sammy Kershaw

from the album Don't Go Near the Water
- B-side: "Harbor for a Lonely Heart"
- Released: October 1, 1991
- Recorded: 1991
- Genre: Country
- Length: 2:54
- Label: Mercury Nashville
- Songwriter: Mark Petersen
- Producers: Buddy Cannon, Norro Wilson

Sammy Kershaw singles chronology
"The Likes of Texas" (1987)	"Cadillac Style" (1991)	"Don't Go Near the Water" (1992)

"Cadillac Style" is a song written by Mark Petersen, and recorded by American country music artist Sammy Kershaw. It was released in October 1991 as the lead single from his debut album Don't Go Near the Water. It peaked at number 3 on the country music charts in both the United States and Canada.

== Background and recording ==
When producer Buddy Cannon first presented Kershaw with a rough demo recording of the song, Kershaw was quoted as saying ‘You’re crazy, I ain’t cutting that. That’s terrible,’ but Cannon persuaded Kershaw and the band to record the song in the last 15 minutes of the recording session booked for the album, and Kershaw ended up loving the song.

== Content ==
The song's narrator says that he doesn't have a lot of nice things, but he says that "my little baby loves me Cadillac style".

== Music video ==
The music video was directed by Steve Boyle.

== Chart performance ==
"Cadillac Style" debuted at number 68 on the U.S. Billboard Hot Country Singles & Tracks for the week of October 12, 1991.

Chart (1991–1992)	Peak position
Canada Country Singles (RPM)	3
US Hot Country Songs (Billboard)	3

=== Year-end charts ===
Chart (1992)	Position
Canada Country Tracks (RPM)	71
