= Haunted Heart (Sammy Kershaw album) =

Studio album by Sammy Kershaw
- Released: March 9, 1993
- Recorded: 1992–1993
- Studio: Music Mill Recording Studio, Nashville, Tennessee
- Genre: Country
- Length: 33:33
- Label: Mercury
- Producer: Buddy Cannon; Norro Wilson

Sammy Kershaw chronology
Don't Go Near the Water (1991)	Haunted Heart (1993)	Feelin' Good Train (1994)

Singles from Haunted Heart
- 1. "She Don't Know She's Beautiful" Released: February 9, 1993; 2. "Haunted Heart" Released: May 3, 1993; 3. "Queen of My Double Wide Trailer" Released: August 23, 1993; 4. "I Can't Reach Her Anymore" Released: January 10, 1994

Professional ratings
Review scores
Source	Rating
AllMusic	4/5 stars
Entertainment Weekly	C+

Haunted Heart is the second studio album by American country music singer Sammy Kershaw, released on March 9, 1993, through Mercury Records. It produced four singles: "She Don't Know She's Beautiful", the title track, "Queen of My Double-Wide Trailer", and "I Can't Reach Her Anymore". "She Don't Know She's Beautiful" was a number-one hit on the Billboard Hot Country Singles & Tracks chart for Kershaw in 1993, while the other three singles reached the top ten on the same chart. Like his debut album, Haunted Heart was certified platinum by the RIAA. "Cry Cry Darlin'" was previously recorded by several other artists, including Bill Monroe, Hank Williams Jr, and Dolly Parton.

== Track listing ==
No.	Title	Writer(s)	Length
1.	"A Memory That Just Won't Quit"	Walt Aldridge, Susan Longacre	2:49
2.	"Queen of My Double-Wide Trailer"	Dennis Linde	3:31
3.	"Still Lovin' You"	Rock Killough	4:05
4.	"She Don't Know She's Beautiful"	Paul Harrison, Bob McDill	2:54
5.	"I Can't Reach Her Anymore"	Mark Petersen, Bruce Theien	3:22
6.	"Haunted Heart"	Buddy Brock, Kim Williams	2:46
7.	"Neon Leon"	Larry Bastian, Buddy Cannon	3:10
8.	"What Might Have Been"	Dean Dillon, Donny Kees	3:33
9.	"You've Got a Lock on My Love"	Bastian, Cannon	3:41
10.	"Cry, Cry Darlin'"	J. D. "Jay" Miller, Jimmy C. Newman	3:42

== Personnel ==
- Kenny Bell – acoustic guitar
- David Briggs – keyboards
- Melonie Cannon – background vocals
- Mike Chapman – bass guitar
- Costo Davis – keyboards
- Sonny Garrish – steel guitar, Dobro
- Steve Gibson – electric guitar
- Rob Hajacos – fiddle
- Bill Hullett – acoustic guitar
- Sammy Kershaw – lead vocals
- Jerry Kroon – drums
- Terry McMillan – harmonica, percussion
- Brent Mason – electric guitar
- Weldon Myrick – steel guitar, Dobro
- Ozzie Osment – fiddle
- Danny Parks – acoustic guitar, mandolin
- Larry Paxton – bass guitar
- Mike Severs – electric guitar
- Steve Turner – drums
- Shania Twain – background vocals
- John Willis – acoustic guitar
- Dennis Wilson – background vocals
- Curtis Young – background vocals

Track information and credits adapted from the album's liner notes.

== Charts ==
=== Weekly charts ===
Chart (1993)	Peak position
Canadian Country Albums (RPM)	10
US Billboard 200	57
US Top Country Albums (Billboard)	11

=== Year-end charts ===
Chart (1993)	Position
US Top Country Albums (Billboard)	42
Chart (1994)	Position
US Top Country Albums (Billboard)	40

=== Singles ===
Title	Date	Chart	Peak position
"She Don't Know She's Beautiful"	April 23, 1993	US Hot Country Songs (Billboard)	1
"Haunted Heart"	August 6, 1993	US Hot Country Songs (Billboard)	9
"Queen of My Double-Wide Trailer"	December 17, 1993	US Hot Country Songs (Billboard)	7
"I Can't Reach Her Anymore"	April 22, 1994	US Hot Country Songs (Billboard)	3

== Certifications ==
Region	Certification	Certified units/sales
United States (RIAA)	Platinum	1,000,000^{^}
^{^} Shipments figures based on certification alone.
