= Anywhere but Here (Sammy Kershaw song) =

Single by Sammy Kershaw

from the album Don't Go Near the Water
- B-side: "Real Old-Fashioned Broken Heart"
- Released: September 28, 1992
- Genre: Country
- Length: 2:29
- Label: Mercury 864316-7
- Songwriters: Buddy Cannon; Bob DiPiero; John Scott Sherrill
- Producers: Buddy Cannon; Norro Wilson

Sammy Kershaw singles chronology
"Yard Sale" (1992)	"Anywhere but Here" (1992)	"She Don't Know She's Beautiful" (1993)

"Anywhere but Here" is a song written by Buddy Cannon, Bob DiPiero and John Scott Sherrill, and recorded by American country music artist Sammy Kershaw. It was released in September 1992 as the fourth and final single from his debut album Don't Go Near the Water. It peaked at No. 10 on the Billboard Hot Country Songs chart and No. 17 on the Canadian RPM country singles chart.

== Critical reception ==
Deborah Evans Price, of Billboard magazine reviewed the song favorably, saying that Kershaw "adds a bit of George Jones flair on this particular number."

== Music video ==
The music video was directed by Mary Matthews and Jeff Smith, and premiered in late 1992, and features a guest appearance by NASCAR driver Mark Martin, and his Roush Racing Valvoline Ford Thunderbird, which plays a role in the video when Kershaw fails to board his tour bus.

== Chart performance ==
"Anywhere but Here" debuted at number 73 on the U.S. Billboard Hot Country Singles & Tracks for the week of October 3, 1992.

Chart (1992–1993)	Peak position
Canada Country Singles (RPM)	17
US Hot Country Songs (Billboard)	10
