= National Working Woman's Holiday =

Single by Sammy Kershaw

from the album Feelin' Good Train
- B-side: "The Heart That Time Forgot"
- Released: June 28, 1994
- Recorded: 1994
- Genre: Country
- Length: 3:08
- Label: Mercury Nashville
- Songwriters: James Dean Hicks, Roger Murrah, Pat Terry
- Producers: Buddy Cannon, Norro Wilson

Sammy Kershaw singles chronology
"I Can't Reach Her Anymore" (1994)	"National Working Woman's Holiday" (1994)	"Third Rate Romance" (1994)

"National Working Woman's Holiday" is a song written by Roger Murrah, Pat Terry and James Dean Hicks, and recorded by American country music artist Sammy Kershaw. It was released in June 1994 as the lead-off single from his album Feelin' Good Train. It peaked at number 2 in the United States, and number 3 in Canada.

== Content ==
The song's narrator thinks that his wife is working too hard, and so he says that she should take the day off for the "national working woman's holiday".

== Music video ==
The music video was directed by Michael Merriman. It has been seen on CMT, The Nashville Network, and CMT Pure Country.

== Chart positions ==
Chart (1994)	Peak position
Canada Country Singles (RPM)	3
US Hot Country Songs (Billboard)	2

=== Year-end charts ===
Chart (1994)	Position
Canada Country Tracks (RPM)	37
US Country Songs (Billboard)	33
