= Yard Sale (song) =

Single by Sammy Kershaw

from the album Don't Go Near the Water
- B-side: ""What Am I Worth"
- Released: June 15, 1992
- Genre: Country
- Length: 3:28
- Label: Mercury
- Songwriters: Larry Bastian, Dewayne Blackwell
- Producers: Buddy Cannon, Norro Wilson

Sammy Kershaw singles chronology
"Don't Go Near the Water" (1992)	"Yard Sale" (1992)	"Anywhere but Here" (1992)

"Yard Sale" is a song written by Larry Bastian and Dewayne Blackwell, and recorded by American country music artist Sammy Kershaw. It was released in June 1992 as the third single from the album Don't Go Near the Water. The song reached number 17 on the Billboard Hot Country Singles & Tracks chart.

== Content ==
The song's lyrics, depicting a garage sale conducted after the sale of a house, serve as a metaphor for a failed relationship. The various household items and articles of clothing (specifically mentioned, dresses, a child's wagon and a hall mirror) hold happy, "golden" memories for the male half of the now-broken couple, who now can only watch with disbelief as the items are being sold, one by one (or, as the singer puts it, "sortin' through what's left of you and me").

== Music video ==
The music video was directed by Mary M. Matthews.

== Chart performance ==
"Yard Sale" debuted at number 75 on the U.S. Billboard Hot Country Singles & Tracks for the week of June 13, 1992.

Chart (1992)	Peak position
Canada Country Singles (RPM)	13
US Hot Country Songs (Billboard)	17
