= Haunted Heart (Sammy Kershaw song) =

Single by Sammy Kershaw

from the album Haunted Heart
- B-side: "Cry, Cry Darlin'"
- Released: May 3, 1993
- Recorded: 1992
- Genre: Country
- Length: 2:46
- Label: Mercury
- Songwriters: Buddy Brock, Kim Williams
- Producers: Buddy Cannon, Norro Wilson

Sammy Kershaw singles chronology
"She Don't Know She's Beautiful" (1993)	"Haunted Heart" (1993)	"Queen of My Double Wide Trailer" (1993)

"Haunted Heart" is a song written by Buddy Brock and Kim Williams, and recorded by American country music artist Sammy Kershaw. It was released in May 1993 as the second single and title track from the album Haunted Heart. The song reached #9 on the Billboard Hot Country Singles & Tracks chart.

== Music video ==
The music video was directed by Michael Merriman and premiered in mid-1993.

== Chart performance ==
"Haunted Heart" debuted at number 71 on the U.S. Billboard Hot Country Singles & Tracks for the week of May 8, 1993.

Chart (1993)	Peak position
Canada Country Singles (RPM)	10
US Hot Country Songs (Billboard)	9
