= Politics, Religion and Her =

Studio album by Sammy Kershaw
- Released: May 7, 1996
- Recorded: 1995
- Studios: Caymoon Moon Recorders, Berry Hill, TN, Emerald Sound Studios, Javalina Recording Studios, Sound Stage Studios, Nashville, TN
- Genre: Country
- Length: 38:38
- Label: Mercury Nashville
- Producers: Buddy Cannon; Keith Stegall; Norro Wilson

Sammy Kershaw chronology
The Hits Chapter 1 (1995)	Politics, Religion and Her (1996)	Labor of Love (1997)

Singles from Politics, Religion and Her
- 1. "Meant to Be" Released: March 11, 1996; 2. "Vidalia" Released: July 22, 1996; 3. "Politics, Religion and Her" Released: November 4, 1996; 4. "Fit to Be Tied Down" Released: April 12, 1997

Politics, Religion and Her is the fourth studio album by American country music artist Sammy Kershaw. The album launched several charting singles and itself charted at number 115 on The Billboard 200, also peaking at number 17 on Top Country Albums. Charting songs included "Vidalia", "Meant to Be", "Fit to Be Tied Down", and the title track, which peaked on the Hot Country Singles & Tracks charts at numbers 10, 5, 29, and 28 respectively.

== Critical reception ==
At the time of release, the album received a C+ review from Entertainment Weekly, which praised the singer for finding emotional depth on songs like "Little Bitty Crack in Her Heart" (which Randy Travis would later record on his 1999 album A Man Ain't Made of Stone) and the title track, but criticized his "tired" covers of "Memphis" and "Chevy Van". Allmusic also found these two pop covers uninspired in nature, but said that the album had "a couple of powerful, soul-baring ballads." Country Standard Time reviewer Larry Stephens gave a more positive review, saying, "His voice can never be mistaken for anything but country while he makes the music come alive. This is an album that has no bad cuts."

== Track listing ==
No.	Title	Writer(s)	Length
1.	"Vidalia"	Tim Nichols, Mark D. Sanders	3:21
2.	"Meant to Be"	Rick Bowles, Chris Waters	3:46
3.	"Fit to Be Tied Down"	Wynn Varble, Charles Victor	3:12
4.	"Politics, Religion and Her"	Byron Hill, Tony Martin	3:19
5.	"Chevy Van"	Sammy Johns	3:42
6.	"Same Place"	Buddy Cannon, Marla Cannon-Goodman, Dean Dillon	2:38
7.	"Little Bitty Crack in Her Heart"	Shawn Camp, Jim Rushing	2:50
8.	"These Flowers"	Rick Giles	3:20
9.	"I Saw You Today"	Bobby Braddock	3:28
10.	"Memphis, Tennessee"	Chuck Berry	2:56
11.	"For Years"	Harley Allen, Stacey Earle	3:22
12.	"Here She Comes"	Sammy Kershaw	2:44

== Personnel ==
Compiled from liner notes.

=== Musicians ===
Tracks 1–4, 7, 10, 11

- Eddie Bayers - drums (all tracks)
- Glen Duncan - fiddle (all tracks)
- Paul Franklin - steel guitar (all tracks), Dobro (track 7)
- Sammy Kershaw - lead vocals (all tracks)
- Brent Mason - electric guitar (all tracks)
- Hargus "Pig" Robbins - piano (all tracks)
- John Wesley Ryles - background vocals (all tracks)
- John D. Willis - acoustic guitar (all tracks)
- Glenn Worf - bass guitar (all tracks)

Tracks 5, 6, 8, 9, 12

- Harold Bradley - tic-tac bass (track 12)
- Sonny Garrish - steel guitar (track 5, 8)
- Stuart Duncan - fiddle (track 8)
- Rob Hajacos - fiddle (track 6, 8, 9)
- John Hobbs - piano (tracks 5, 6, 8, 9)
- Sammy Kershaw - lead vocals (all tracks)
- Paul Leim - drums (all tracks)
- Nashville String Machine - strings (tracks 6, 9)
- Steve Nathan - organ (track 9), piano (track 12)
- Danny Parks - acoustic guitar (all tracks)
- Larry Paxton - bass guitar (all tracks)
- Hal Rugg - steel guitar (tracks 6, 9)
- John Wesley Ryles - background vocals (all tracks)
- Dennis Wilson - background vocals (all tracks)
- Reggie Young - electric guitar (all tracks)

=== Technical ===
- Bob Bullock - recording
- Buddy Cannon and Norro Wilson - production (tracks 5, 6, 8, 9, 12)
- John Kelton - mixing, recording
- Warren Peterson - string recording
- Keith Stegall - production (tracks 1–4, 7, 10, 11)
- Ronnie Thomas - digital editing
- Hank Williams - mastering

== Charts ==
=== Weekly charts ===
Chart (1996)	Peak position
US Billboard 200	115
US Top Country Albums (Billboard)	17

=== Year-end charts ===
Chart (1996)	Position
US Top Country Albums (Billboard)	56

=== Singles ===
Year	Single	Peak chart positions	
Year	Single	US Country	CAN Country
1996	"Meant to Be"	5	4
1996	"Vidalia"	10	7
1997	"Politics, Religion, and Her"	28	47
1997	"Fit to Be Tied Down"	29	49
