= Queen of My Double Wide Trailer =

Single by Sammy Kershaw

from the album Haunted Heart
- B-side: "A Memory That Just Won't Quit"
- Released: August 23, 1993
- Recorded: 1993
- Genre: Country
- Length: 3:31
- Label: Mercury
- Songwriter: Dennis Linde
- Producers: Buddy Cannon, Norro Wilson

Sammy Kershaw singles chronology
"Haunted Heart" (1993)	"Queen of My Double Wide Trailer" (1993)	"I Can't Reach Her Anymore" (1994)

"Queen of My Double Wide Trailer" is a song written by Dennis Linde, and recorded by American country music artist Sammy Kershaw. It was released in August 1993 as the third single from his album Haunted Heart. It peaked at No. 7 in the United States, and No. 3 in Canada.

American Aquarium covered the song on their 2021 album Slappers, Bangers, and Certified Twangers: Vol 1.

== Content ==
The song is a mid-tempo in shifting meters (4/4 and 11/4 time) about a man who, upon losing his lover to a man named Earl, arrives to take her back. Kershaw said that peers had tried to convince him that audiences would be unable to identify with the song, but later pointed out that "Somebody must have identified with it. In fact, this song singlehandedly sold hundreds of thousands of albums". Earl later appears in Linde's "Goodbye Earl", made famous by the then-Dixie Chicks.

== Music video ==
The music video premiered in October 1993, and was directed by Michael Merriman.

== Charts ==
"Queen of My Double Wide Trailer" debuted at number 72 on the U.S. Billboard Hot Country Singles & Tracks for the week of September 4, 1993.

Chart (1993)	Peak position
Canada Country Singles (RPM)	3
US Hot Country Songs (Billboard)	7

=== Year-end charts ===
Chart (1994)	Position
Canada Country Tracks (RPM)	81
