= She Don't Know She's Beautiful =

Single by Sammy Kershaw

from the album Haunted Heart
- B-side: "I Buy Her Roses"
- Released: February 9, 1993
- Recorded: 1992
- Genre: Country
- Length: 2:53
- Label: Mercury
- Songwriters: Paul Harrison; Bob McDill
- Producers: Buddy Cannon; Norro Wilson

Sammy Kershaw singles chronology
"Anywhere but Here" (1992)	"She Don't Know She's Beautiful" (1993)	"Haunted Heart" (1993)

"She Don't Know She's Beautiful" is a song written by Paul Harrison and Bob McDill, and recorded by American country music singer Sammy Kershaw. It was released in February 1993 as the first single from his album, Haunted Heart and became Kershaw's only Number One hit as it was number one in Canada and the United States.The song reached the top of the Billboard Hot Country Singles & Tracks chart.

== Chart performance ==
The song debuted at number 67 on the Hot Country Songs chart dated February 13, 1993. It charted for 20 weeks on that chart, and reached Number One on the chart dated April 24, 1993, becoming Kershaw's only Number One hit in the United States and Canada.

=== Content ===
In the song, Kershaw sings about a woman who is unaware of her own beauty despite his repeated compliments. He describes other people staring at or whistling at her in admiration, while she remains confused by the attention she receives. Even when the couple wakes up in the morning, he is still captivated by her appearance, leading to the refrain that “she don’t know she’s beautiful.”

=== Charts ===
Chart (1993)	Peak position
Canada Country Singles (RPM)	1
US Bubbling Under Hot 100 (Billboard)	19
US Hot Country Songs (Billboard)	1

=== Year-end charts ===
Chart (1993)	Position
Canada Country Tracks (RPM)	54
US Country Songs (Billboard)	21
