= Benjamin F. Logan =

Fiddler

Benjamin Franklin "Tex" Logan, Jr. (June 6, 1927 – April 24, 2015) was an American electrical engineer and bluegrass music fiddler. Born in Coahoma, Texas, Logan earned a B.Sc. in electrical engineering at Texas Tech University, then Texas Technological College, in Lubbock, Texas, studied for a B.Sc. in engineering at Massachusetts Institute of Technology (1946–51), and completed a M.Sc. (1956). He then moved to New Jersey where he joined Bell Labs (1956) and started his doctoral studies at Columbia University. There he earned a Ph.D. in electrical engineering with his dissertation "Properties of High-Pass Signals" (1965). Logan joined the communication theory department at Bell Labs (1956) where he and others demonstrated the use of computer simulation in the study of reverberation in digital audio, and did joint work with Manfred R. Schroeder who later pioneered MP3 audio (1961). Dr. Logan also patented a device to reduce echoes over telephone lines with a colleague named John Kelly. He was with the mathematics center (1963–93) where he contributed to the theory of signals.

As was his father Frank, Logan was a fiddler. He played with Mike Seeger in the late 1950s, with the Lilly Brothers & Don Stover and Bill Monroe in the 1960s, and with Peter Rowan in the 1980s. He performed on several records and international tours, and had minor roles in movies as well. Logan wrote "Christmas Time's A-Comin'", a song made popular by Bill Monroe that has been recorded by many performers, including Johnny Cash, Emmylou Harris, Sammy Kershaw, Rhonda Vincent, and Patty Loveless, among others; and "Diamond Joe" recorded by Bob Dylan. In 1969, Logan played fiddle on the Bee Gees' 1969 song "Give Your Best", released on the band's sixth album Odessa.

Logan died April 24, 2015, in Morristown, New Jersey, by the side of his daughter, Jody.

== See also ==
- Shepp–Logan phantom
- Hook length formula
- Ridge function
