= Love of My Life (Sammy Kershaw song) =

Single by Sammy Kershaw

from the album Labor of Love
- B-side: "Roamin' Love"
- Released: October 20, 1997
- Genre: Country
- Length: 4:22
- Label: Mercury Nashville
- Songwriters: Keith Stegall; Dan Hill
- Producer: Keith Stegall

Sammy Kershaw singles chronology
"Fit to Be Tied Down" (1997)	"Love of My Life" (1997)	"Matches" (1998)

Alternative cover
- Terri Clark duet version cover

"Love of My Life" is a song written by Keith Stegall and Dan Hill, and recorded by American country music artist Sammy Kershaw. It was released in October 1997 as the lead-off single from his album Labor of Love. It peaked at number 2 in the United States, behind Tim McGraw's smash hit "Just to See You Smile", and at number 3 in Canada. A duet version with Terri Clark was also released as the B-side, although other versions have "Roamin' Love" on the B-side.

The song was also recorded by Ace of Base in 1997 as a potential track for their third album, but didn't make the final cut.

== Content ==
The song is a ballad in the key of B♭ major and a 4/4 time signature, with a vocal range from B♭_{3} to F_{5}. In it, the male narrator tells his lover that she is the love of his life. In the chorus, he adds that he was hesitant and shy until she "came and saved" him.

== Music video ==
The music video was directed by Michael Salomon, and it begins with the song "Meant to Be", then it cuts to Kershaw and his lover at their house.

== Chart positions ==
"Love of My Life" debuted at number 63 on the U.S. Billboard Hot Country Singles & Tracks for the chart week of October 25, 1997.

Chart (1997–1998)	Peak position
Canada Country Singles (RPM)	3
US Billboard Hot 100	85
US Hot Country Songs (Billboard)	2

=== Year-end charts ===
Chart (1998)	Position
US Country Songs (Billboard)	10
