= Southbound (Mac McAnally song) =

Single by Sammy Kershaw

from the album Feelin' Good Train
- B-side: "Better Call a Preacher"
- Released: December 3, 1994
- Genre: Country
- Length: 4:31
- Label: Mercury
- Songwriter: Mac McAnally
- Producers: Buddy Cannon, Norro Wilson

Sammy Kershaw singles chronology
"Third Rate Romance" (1994)	"Southbound" (1994)	"If You're Gonna Walk, I'm Gonna Crawl" (1995)

"Southbound" is a song written and originally recorded by American country music singer Mac McAnally for his 1990 album Simple Life. It was released as a single by American country music artist Sammy Kershaw. It was released in December 1994 as the third single from the album Feelin' Good Train. The song reached number 27 on the Billboard Hot Country Singles & Tracks chart.

== Content ==
The song is a ballad about a narrator expressing his nostalgia for his childhood in the Southern United States. According to a review in Gavin Report, Kershaw said that he considered the song the "story of his life".

== Critical reception ==
Holly Gleason of CD Review described the song favorably, saying that it "paints a moving picture of emotional displacement."

== Chart performance ==
Chart (1994–1995)	Peak position
Canada Country Singles (RPM)	17
US Hot Country Songs (Billboard)	27
