= I Can't Reach Her Anymore =

Single by Sammy Kershaw

from the album Haunted Heart
- B-side: "What Might Have Been"
- Released: January 10, 1994
- Genre: Country
- Length: 3:22
- Label: Mercury
- Songwriters: Mark Petersen, Bruce Theien
- Producers: Buddy Cannon, Norro Wilson

Sammy Kershaw singles chronology
"Queen of My Double Wide Trailer" (1993)	"I Can't Reach Her Anymore" (1994)	"National Working Woman's Holiday" (1994)

"I Can't Reach Her Anymore" is a song written by Mark Petersen and Bruce Theien, and recorded by American country music artist Sammy Kershaw. It was released in January 1994 as the fourth single from the album Haunted Heart. The song reached number 3 on the Billboard Hot Country Singles & Tracks chart.

== Content ==
The narrator expresses the desire to rekindle a relationship with his ex-lover, whom he walked away from. After having a couple of awkward conversations the narrator states his desire to talk about the past. She begins to avoid his phone calls, either hanging up or further distancing herself from him when he attempts to contact her.

== Chart performance ==
"I Can't Reach Her Anymore" debuted at number 69 on the U.S. Billboard Hot Country Singles & Tracks for the week of January 15, 1994.

Chart (1994)	Peak position
Canada Country Singles (RPM)	9
US Hot Country Songs (Billboard)	3

=== Year-end charts ===
Chart (1994)	Position
US Country Songs (Billboard)	50
