= Category 5 Records =

American record label

- Founded: 2005
- Founder: Raymond Termini
- Defunct: 2009
- Status: Inactive
- Distributor: Sony/Red
- Genre: Country
- Country of origin: U.S.
- Location: Nashville, Tennessee

Category 5 Records was an independent record label based in Nashville, Tennessee. Founded in 2005, the label included eight different country music artists in its roster. The label was owned by Raymond Termini and was disestablished in 2009.

== History ==
Category 5 Records was founded in January 2005 by its president, Raymond Termini. Tony Benken, formerly a promotion director of the Broken Bow Records label, was signed as vice president of promotion for Category 5. Carl Strube, formerly president of Critique Records, was the label's vice president and general manager. Portions of the label's proceeds were given to hurricane relief funds.

The first act signed to Category 5 was Craig Hand, whose debut single "Direct Connect" was released in February 2006. Other acts signed to the label included Travis Tritt, Sammy Kershaw, Donovan Chapman, and Jerrod Niemann. Tritt and Kershaw had previously been on major labels, and Chapman was previously on Curb Records. Kershaw's 2006 album Honky Tonk Boots was the label's first full album release.

In 2006, Termini was under investigation by the Connecticut Department of Social Services for allegations of neglect at a series of assisted living facilities he owned in Connecticut, as well as allegations that he improperly used assets from the facilities to fund the record label.

In 2007, Travis Tritt sued the label for breach of contract and fraud.

== Roster ==
- Donovan Chapman
- Craig Hand
- George Jones (courtesy of Bandit Records)
- Sammy Kershaw
- Jerrod Niemann
- Odiss Kohn
- Shauna
- Travis Tritt
