= Vidalia (song) =

Single by Sammy Kershaw

from the album Politics, Religion and Her
- Released: July 22, 1996
- Genre: Country
- Length: 3:21
- Label: Mercury
- Songwriters: Tim Nichols, Mark D. Sanders
- Producer: Keith Stegall

Sammy Kershaw singles chronology
"Meant to Be" (1996)	"Vidalia" (1996)	"Politics, Religion and Her" (1996)

"Vidalia" is a song written by Tim Nichols and Mark D. Sanders, and recorded by American country music artist Sammy Kershaw. It was released in July 1996 as the second single from the album Politics, Religion and Her. The song reached number 10 on the Billboard Hot Country Singles & Tracks chart.

== Content ==
The song is a wordplay on Vidalia onions and a woman named Vidalia.

== Critical reception ==
Deborah Evans Price, of Billboard magazine reviewed the song favorably, calling it a "nice blend of cuteness and country boy wit rolled into a song of love and longing. She goes on to say that it is the kind of left-of-center love song that Kershaw has "always excelled at."

== Music video ==
The music video was directed by Michael Merriman and premiered in mid-1996. It was filmed during Kershaw's 1996 tour, and in Vidalia, Georgia, and features Kershaw performing to a large crowd, and scenes of farmers harvesting Vidalia onions.

== Chart performance ==
"Vidalia" debuted at number 57 on the U.S. Billboard Hot Country Singles & Tracks for the week of July 27, 1996.

Chart (1996)	Peak position
Canada Country Singles (RPM)	7
US Hot Country Songs (Billboard)	10

=== Year-end charts ===
Chart (1996)	Position
Canada Country Tracks (RPM)	96
