= Matches (Sammy Kershaw song) =

Single by Sammy Kershaw

from the album Labor of Love
- B-side: "Thank God You're Gone"
- Released: March 23, 1998
- Genre: Country
- Length: 3:52
- Label: Mercury
- Songwriters: Skip Ewing, Roger Springer
- Producer: Keith Stegall

Sammy Kershaw singles chronology
"Love of My Life" (1997)	"Matches" (1998)	"Honky Tonk America" (1998)

"Matches" is a song recorded by American country music artist Sammy Kershaw. It was released in March 1998 as the second single from the album Labor of Love. The song reached #22 on the Billboard Hot Country Singles & Tracks chart. The song was written by Skip Ewing and Roger Springer.

== Content ==
The song is about a man who meets a woman at a bar, where he offers to light her cigarette with a book of matches. Later on, the two break up, and the man uses the matches to burn down the bar where they met.

== Music video ==
The music video debuted on CMT on February 25, 1998. Kershaw came up with the video's concept himself, and Deaton-Flanigen Productions directed it. The video retells the song's story, using a lounge in downtown Nashville, Tennessee, to represent the bar's interior, and another bar in Hartsville, Tennessee, to represent the exterior. The actor who portrays the song's narrator sets the bar ablaze and then exits unharmed as the bar catches fire. According to Kershaw, he nearly canceled the video shoot after another building in Hartsville caught fire the same day, but was encouraged by the city's mayor to proceed with the shoot.

== Chart performance ==
Chart (1998)	Peak position
US Hot Country Songs (Billboard)	22
Canadian RPM Country Tracks	30
