= Politics, Religion and Her (song) =

Single by Sammy Kershaw

from the album Politics, Religion and Her
- B-side: "Here She Comes"
- Released: November 4, 1996
- Recorded: 1996
- Genre: Country
- Length: 3:19
- Label: Mercury
- Songwriters: Byron Hill, Tony Martin
- Producer: Keith Stegall

Sammy Kershaw singles chronology
"Vidalia" (1996)	"Politics, Religion and Her" (1996)	"Fit to Be Tied Down" (1997)

"Politics, Religion and Her" is a song written by Byron Hill and Tony Martin, and recorded by American country music artist Sammy Kershaw. It was released in November 1996 as the third single and title track from the album Politics, Religion and Her. The song peaked at #28 on the Billboard Hot Country Singles & Tracks chart.

== Chart performance ==
Chart (1996)	Peak position
US Hot Country Songs (Billboard)	28
Canadian RPM Country Tracks	47
