= Labor of Love (Sammy Kershaw album) =

Studio album by Sammy Kershaw
- Released: November 4, 1997
- Studio: Compass Point Studios, Nassau, Bahamas. Cayman Moon Recorders, Berry Hill, TN, The Castle, Franklin, TN, Sound Stage Studios, Wedgewood Studios, Nashville, TN
- Genre: Country
- Length: 36:39
- Label: Mercury Nashville
- Producer: Keith Stegall

Sammy Kershaw chronology
Politics, Religion and Her (1996)	Labor of Love (1997)	Maybe Not Tonight (1999)

Singles from Labor of Love
- 1. "Love of My Life" Released: October 20, 1997; 2. "Matches" Released: March 23, 1998; 3. "Honky Tonk America" Released: June 27, 1998; 4. "One Day Left to Live" Released: October 10, 1998

Professional ratings
Review scores
Source	Rating
Allmusic	link
Country Standard Time	(not rated) link

Labor of Love is the fifth studio album by the American country music artist Sammy Kershaw. It was released in 1997 (see 1997 in country music) on Mercury Records. It was his third album to achieve RIAA platinum certification and his highest-charting album on the Top Country Albums charts, where it peaked at #5.

In order of release, this album's singles were "Love of My Life", "Matches", "Honky Tonk America" and "One Day Left to Live", which respectively reached #2, #22, #31 and #35 on the Hot Country Songs charts. "Little Did I Know" was co-written by Dave Gibson (formerly of the Gibson/Miller Band) and Bill McCorvey, lead vocalist of Pirates of the Mississippi.

== Track listing ==
No.	Title	Writer(s)	Length
1.	"Honky Tonk America"	Bob McDill	3:56
2.	"Shootin' the Bull (In an Old Cowtown)"	Monty Criswell, Michael White	3:01
3.	"One Day Left to Live"	Randy Boudreaux, Dean Dillon, John Northrup	2:54
4.	"Cotton County Queen"	Phil Barnhart, Sam Hogin, Wally Wilson	3:35
5.	"Matches"	Skip Ewing, Roger Springer	3:52
6.	"Labor of Love"	Larry Boone, Billy Lawson	2:27
7.	"Thank God You're Gone"	Sammy Kershaw, Mike Fornes	3:22
8.	"Little Did I Know"	Greg Crowe, Dave Gibson, Bill McCorvey	2:45
9.	"Arms Length Away"	White, Monty Criswell, Lee Thomas Miller	3:19
10.	"Roamin' Love"	Kershaw	3:08
11.	"Love of My Life"	Keith Stegall, Dan Hill	4:22

== Personnel ==
As listed in liner notes.

- Eddie Bayers - drums
- Stuart Duncan - fiddle
- Paul Franklin - steel guitar
- Sammy Kershaw - lead vocals
- Brent Mason - electric guitar
- Hargus "Pig" Robbins - keyboards
- John Wesley Ryles - background vocals
- Joe Spivey - fiddle
- John D. Willis - acoustic guitar
- Glenn Worf - bass guitar

== Charts ==
=== Weekly charts ===
Chart (1997)	Peak position
Canadian Country Albums (RPM)	9
US Billboard 200	49
US Top Country Albums (Billboard)	5

=== Year-end charts ===
Chart (1998)	Position
US Billboard 200	160
US Top Country Albums (Billboard)	17
