= RCA Records Nashville =

Country music record label

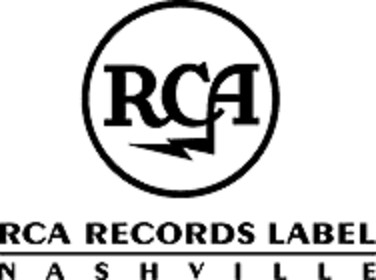
- Parent company: Sony Music Entertainment
- Distributor: Sony Music Nashville (US)
- Genre: Country
- Country of origin: United States
- Official website: rcarecordslabel.com

RCA Nashville is an American country music record label based in Nashville, Tennessee. It is distributed by Sony Music Nashville which is part of Sony Music Entertainment.

== Artists ==
=== Current artists ===
- Kane Brown
- Corey Kent
- Nate Smith
- Morgan Wade

=== Former artists ===
- Alabama
- Deborah Allen
- Eddy Arnold
- Chet Atkins
- Baillie & the Boys
- David Ball
- Bobby Bare
- Jeff Bates
- Matraca Berg
- Clint Black
- Catherine Britt
- Garth Brooks
- Jim Ed Brown
- Tracy Byrd
- Bush Hawg
- Helen Cornelius
- Paul Craft
- Gail Davies
- Skeeter Davis
- John Denver
- Dean Dillon
- Ty England
- Sara Evans
- Leon Everette
- Family Brown
- Ray Price (RCA/Dimension)
- Foster & Lloyd
- Keith Gattis
- Vince Gill
- Danny Gokey
- Andy Griggs
- Gus Hardin
- Mike Henderson
- Becky Hobbs
- Ryan Hurd (Moved To Arista Nashville)
- Andrew Jannakos
- Waylon Jennings
- George Jones
- Steve Dorff
- The Judds (RCA/Curb)
- Kristen Kelly
- Miranda Lambert
- Aaron Lines
- Eddie London
- Brice Long
- Love and Theft
- Lauren Lucas
- Louise Mandrell
- Jim Lauderdale
- Martina McBride
- Coley McCabe
- Pake McEntire
- Ronnie Milsap
- Niko Moon (RCA/River House)
- Lorrie Morgan
- Juice Newton
- The Oak Ridge Boys
- Jamie O'Hara
- Old Dominion (Moved To Arista Nashville)
- Robert Ellis Orrall
- Jake Owen
- The Osborn Sisters
- K.T. Oslin
- Paul Overstreet
- Dolly Parton
- John Pierce
- Bobby Pinson
- Pistol Annies
- Charley Pride
- Eddie Rabbitt
- Eddy Raven
- Jerry Reed
- Restless Road
- Jim Reeves
- Restless Heart
- Kenny Rogers
- Crystal Shawanda
- Shenandoah
- Connie Smith
- Joanna Smith
- Hank Snow
- Jo-El Sonnier
- Tate Stevens
- Jimmy Buffett (RCA/Mailboat)
- Tommy Shane Steiner
- Larry Stewart
- Sylvia
- Nat Stuckey
- 3 of Hearts
- Josh Thompson
- The Thompson Brothers Band
- Mel Tillis
- Aaron Tippin
- Steve Vaus
- Porter Wagoner
- Clay Walker
- Rachel Wammack
- Steve Wariner
- Dottie West
- Lari White
- Keith Whitley
- Chuck Wicks
- Wild Choir
- Don Williams
- Trisha Yearwood
- Chris Young

== See also ==
- Sony Music Nashville
- Arista Nashville
- BNA Records
- RCA Records
