= Feelin' Good Train =

Studio album by Sammy Kershaw
- Released: June 21, 1994
- Studio: Eleven Eleven Sound Studios, Music Mill Recording Studios, Nashville, Tennessee
- Genre: Country
- Length: 34:38
- Label: Mercury
- Producer: Buddy Cannon; Norro Wilson

Sammy Kershaw chronology
Haunted Heart (1993)	Feelin' Good Train (1994)	Christmas Time's A-Comin' (1995)

Singles from Feelin' Good Train
- 1. "National Working Woman's Holiday" Released: June 28, 1994; 2. "Third Rate Romance" Released: August 30, 1994; 3. "Southbound" Released: December 3, 1994; 4. "If You're Gonna Walk, I'm Gonna Crawl" Released: March 18, 1995

Professional ratings
Review scores
Source	Rating
Allmusic	link
Entertainment Weekly	B link

Feelin' Good Train is the third studio album by American country music artist Sammy Kershaw. It was released in 1994 (see 1994 in country music) on Mercury Records. The album produced four singles for Kershaw on the Billboard country charts. The first two singles were "National Working Woman's Holiday" and a cover of the Amazing Rhythm Aces' "Third Rate Romance", both of which peaked at #2. Following it was a cover of the Mac McAnally song "Southbound" at #27 and also "If You're Gonna Walk, I'm Gonna Crawl" at #18. Also included is a re-release of a duet with George Jones called "Never Bit a Bullet Like This", which was previously released on Jones' 1993 album High-Tech Redneck.

== Track listing ==
No.	Title	Writer(s)	Length
1.	"Feelin' Good Train"	Al Anderson, Mike Lawler	3:34
2.	"Third Rate Romance"	Russell Smith	3:21
3.	"If You Ever Come This Way Again"	Dean Dillon, Donny Kees	3:19
4.	"National Working Woman's Holiday"	James Dean Hicks, Roger Murrah, Pat Terry	3:08
5.	"Southbound"	Mac McAnally	4:31
6.	"Better Call a Preacher"	Sammy Kershaw, Steven D. Cohen, Rick Lagneaux	2:30
7.	"Paradise from Nine to One"	Rick Bowles, Pat Bunch, Josh Leo	3:39
8.	"Too Far Gone to Leave"	Rock Killough, Larry T. Wilson	2:50
9.	"If You're Gonna Walk, I'm Gonna Crawl"	Larry Bastian, Buddy Cannon	2:18
10.	"The Heart That Time Forgot"	Tony Martin, Sterling Whipple	3:07
11.	"Never Bit a Bullet Like This" (duet with George Jones)	Jim Foster, Mark Petersen	2:21
Total length:			34:38

== Personnel ==
As listed in liner notes.

- David Briggs - piano
- Gary Burr - background vocals on "Third Rate Romance"
- Mike Chapman - bass guitar
- Sonny Garrish - steel guitar
- Rob Hajacos - fiddle
- George Jones - vocals on "Never Bit a Bullet Like This"
- Sammy Kershaw - lead vocals, acoustic guitar
- Mike Lawler - keyboards
- Paul Leim - drums
- Mac McAnally - background vocals on "Southbound"
- Brent Mason - electric guitar on "Never Bit a Bullet Like This"
- Joey Miskulin - accordion
- Danny Parks - acoustic guitar
- Russell Smith - background vocals on "Third Rate Romance"
- Jo-El Sonnier - accordion
- Cindy Richardson Walker - background vocals
- Dennis Wilson - background vocals
- Lonnie Wilson - drums on "Never Bit a Bullet Like This"
- Curtis Young - background vocals
- Reggie Young - electric guitar

Strings by The Nashville String Machine conducted by Carl Gorodetzky

== Chart performance ==
Chart (1994)	Peak position
US Top Country Albums (Billboard)	9
US Billboard 200	73
Canadian RPM Country Albums	2
