= Don't Go Near the Water (Sammy Kershaw song) =

Single by Sammy Kershaw

from the album Don't Go Near the Water
- B-side: "Every Third Monday"
- Released: January 1992
- Genre: Country
- Length: 3:04
- Label: Mercury
- Songwriters: Chapin Hartford, Jim Foster
- Producers: Buddy Cannon, Norro Wilson

Sammy Kershaw singles chronology
"Cadillac Style" (1991)	"Don't Go Near the Water" (1992)	"Yard Sale" (1992)

"Don't Go Near the Water" is a song written by Chapin Hartford and Jim Foster, and recorded by American country music artist Sammy Kershaw. It was released in January 1992 as the second single and title track from the album Don't Go Near the Water. The song reached number 12 on the Billboard Hot Country Singles & Tracks chart.

== Chart performance ==
Chart (1992)	Peak position
Canada Country Singles (RPM)	5
US Hot Country Songs (Billboard)	12

=== Year-end charts ===
Chart (1992)	Position
Canada Country Tracks (RPM)	63
