= Don't Go Near the Water (album) =

Studio album by Sammy Kershaw
- Released: October 8, 1991
- Studio: Music Mill (Nashville, Tennessee)
- Genre: Country
- Length: 31:56
- Label: Mercury
- Producer: Buddy Cannon, Norro Wilson

Sammy Kershaw chronology
Don't Go Near the Water (1991)	Haunted Heart (1993)

Singles from Don't Go Near the Water
- 1. "Cadillac Style" Released: October 1, 1991; 2. "Don't Go Near the Water" Released: January 1992; 3. "Yard Sale" Released: June 15, 1992; 4. "Anywhere but Here" Released: September 28. 1992

Professional ratings
Review scores
Source	Rating
AllMusic	3/5 stars
Entertainment Weekly	B

Don't Go Near the Water is the debut studio album by American country music artist Sammy Kershaw. Released in 1991 on Mercury Records, the album produced four singles on the Billboard Hot Country Singles & Tracks (now Hot Country Songs) charts: "Cadillac Style", the title track, "Yard Sale", and "Anywhere but Here", which peaked at numbers 3, 12, 17, and 10, respectively. Also included is "What Am I Worth", a song previously recorded by George Jones on his 1957 debut Grand Ole Opry's New Star. Jones's style has been cited as one of Kershaw's primary influences. Don't Go Near the Water is certified platinum in the United States.

== Track listing ==
No.	Title	Writer(s)	Length
1.	"Real Old-Fashioned Broken Heart"	Bob McDill	3:22
2.	"Don't Go Near the Water"	Chapin Hartford, Jim Foster	3:04
3.	"I Buy Her Roses"	Roger Brown, Glenn Ray	3:52
4.	"Cadillac Style"	Mark Petersen	2:54
5.	"Kickin' In"	Roger Murrah, Keith Stegall	3:22
6.	"What Am I Worth"	Darrell Edwards, George Jones	2:28
7.	"Yard Sale"	Larry Bastian, Dewayne Blackwell	3:28
8.	"Anywhere but Here"	Buddy Cannon, Bob DiPiero, John Scott Sherrill	2:29
9.	"Every Third Monday"	Larry Cordle, Larry Shell, Billy Henderson	2:47
10.	"Harbor for a Lonely Heart"	Kostas, Jenny Yates	4:10

== Personnel ==
- Kenny Bell – acoustic guitar
- David Briggs – keyboards
- Costo Davis – keyboards
- Glen Duncan – fiddle
- Sonny Garrish – steel guitar, Dobro
- Rob Hajacos – fiddle
- John Hughey – steel guitar
- Sammy Kershaw – lead vocals
- Jerry Kroon – drums
- Brent Mason – electric guitar
- Danny Parks – acoustic guitar, fiddle
- Larry Paxton – bass guitar, keyboards
- Billy Sanford – acoustic guitar, electric guitar
- Dennis Wilson – background vocals
- Curtis Young – background vocals

== Chart performance ==
Chart (1991)	Peak position
U.S. Billboard Top Country Albums	17
U.S. Billboard 200	95
U.S. Billboard Top Heatseekers	5
Canadian RPM Country Albums	5
