= Meant to Be (Sammy Kershaw song) =

Single by Sammy Kershaw

from the album Politics, Religion and Her
- B-side: "Vidalia"
- Released: March 11, 1996
- Genre: Country
- Length: 3:46
- Label: Mercury Nashville
- Songwriters: Rick Bowles, Chris Waters
- Producer: Keith Stegall

Sammy Kershaw singles chronology
"Your Tattoo" (1995)	"Meant to Be" (1996)	"Vidalia" (1996)

"Meant to Be" is a song written by Chris Waters and Rick Bowles, and recorded by American country music artist Sammy Kershaw. It was released in March 1996 as the first single from his album Politics, Religion and Her. It peaked at number 5 on the United States Billboard Hot Country Singles & Tracks chart and at number 4 on the Canadian RPM Country Tracks chart.

== Content ==
The song discusses the joys of a love that is meant to be.

== Critical reception ==
Deborah Evans Price of Billboard magazine reviewed the song favorably, saying that it contains "a sweet, simple melody and solid lyric" and that Kershaw's "country-boy phrasing is icing on the cake".

== Music video ==
The music video was directed by Michael Salomon. It features Kershaw singing the song at an airport. In the video's opening, he picks up a camera, discusses couples falling in love with the woman sitting beside him, and spies on people, including a man and a woman he hopes they'll fall in love. In the end, the mans greets his wife and daughter and the woman named Missy, who sits besides Kershaw, says that he picked the wrong couple and they meet. In the video's ending, they have a drink at the bar, sit on the plane together, and they drive home in a cab together.

== Chart positions ==
"Meant to Be" debuted at number 66 on the U.S. Billboard Hot Country Singles & Tracks for the week of March 23, 1996.

=== Weekly charts ===
Chart (1996)	Peak position
Canada Country Singles (RPM)	4
US Hot Country Songs (Billboard)	5

=== Year-end charts ===
Chart (1996)	Position
Canada Country Tracks (RPM)	86
US Country Songs (Billboard)	62
