= Sammy Kershaw =

American country music singer (born 1958)

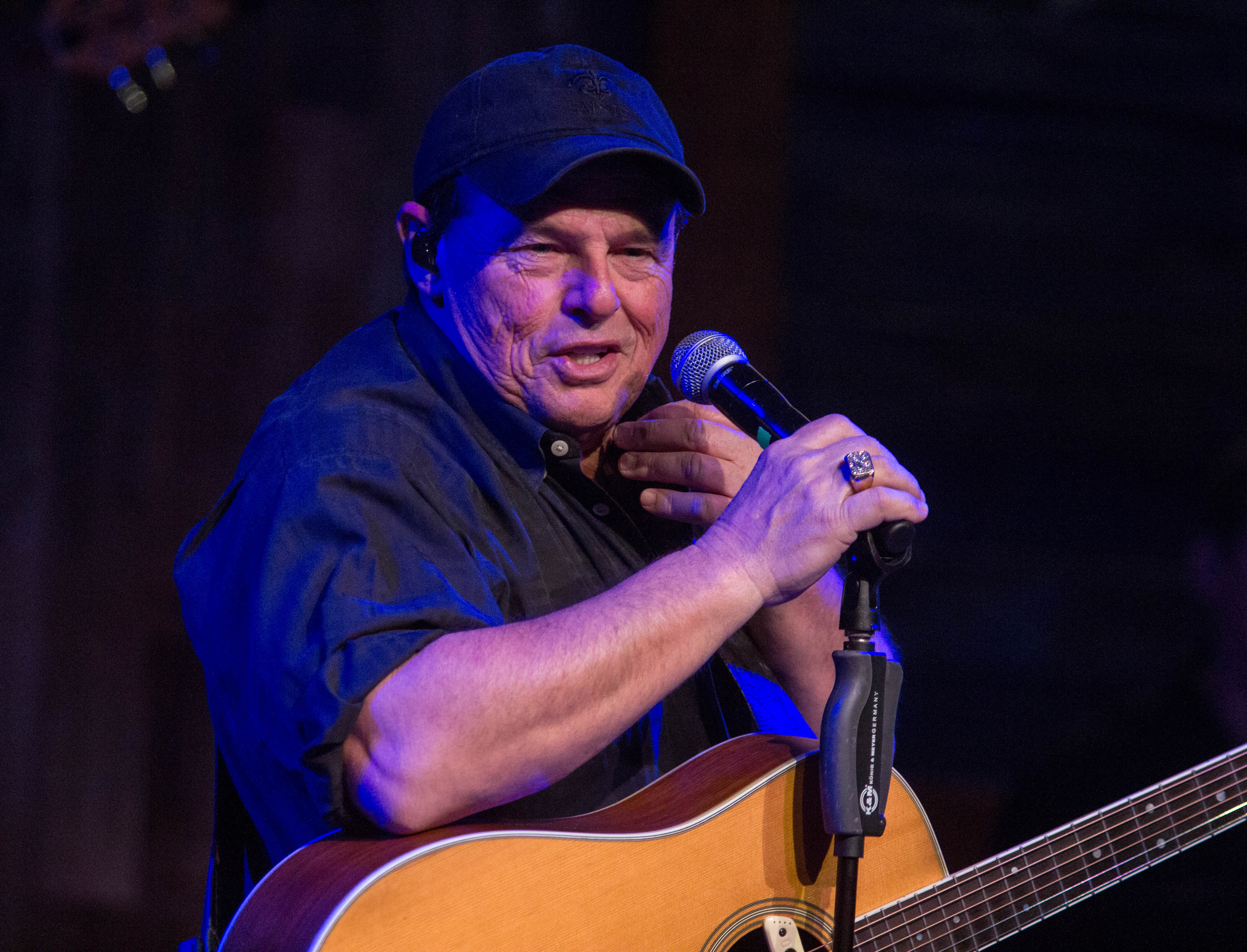
- Kershaw in 2018

Background information
- Born: Samuel Paul Cashat; February 24, 1958 (age 68); Kaplan, Louisiana, U.S.
- Origin: Nashville, Tennessee, U.S.
- Genre: Neotraditional Country
- Instruments: Vocals; Guitar
- Years active: 1969-present
- Labels: Master-Trak, Mercury, Audium/Koch, Category 5, Boomerville, Big Hit, Cleopatra
- Spouse: Lorrie Morgan (m. 2001; div. 2007)
- Website: www.sammykershaw.com

Sammy Kershaw (born Samuel Paul Cashat; February 24, 1958), is an American country music singer. He has released 16 studio albums, with three RIAA platinum certifications and two gold certifications among them. More than 25 singles have entered the Top 40 on the Billboard Hot Country Songs charts, including his only number one hit "She Don't Know She's Beautiful" and 10 more Top 10 hits: "Cadillac Style", "Anywhere but Here", "Haunted Heart", "Queen of My Double-Wide Trailer", "I Can't Reach Her Anymore", "National Working Woman's Holiday", "Third Rate Romance", "Meant to Be", "Vidalia", and "Love of My Life".

Kershaw tried to enter politics, running as a Republican candidate for lieutenant governor of Louisiana in 2007 and 2010. In 2007 he finished third in the jungle primary, but Democrat Mitch Landrieu won strongly in the general election. In 2010 he carried more parishes than any other candidate, but placed third. He endorsed Republican Jay Dardenne, Secretary of State, for the position, who won the general election. From 2001 to 2007, Kershaw was married to country singer Lorrie Morgan.

== Early life and career ==
Samuel Paul Cashat was born in the Acadiana town of Kaplan, located in South Louisiana. He is the third cousin of singers Rusty and Doug Kershaw. When he was 11, his grandfather gave him his first guitar. But his father died that year, so Sammy started to work a variety of day jobs while playing roadhouses at night to support his family. He began performing in Acadiana with J.B. Pere. At the age of 12, Kershaw was playing in a variety of honky-tonks and beer joints, and when he was 14 he met George Jones, his lifelong idol. Subsequently, he opened shows for Ray Price, Merle Haggard, and George Jones while still in his teens.

== Musical career ==
One of Kershaw's demonstration tapes made its way to Mercury Records, which released his debut album Don't Go Near the Water in 1991. This album was certified platinum by the RIAA, and it produced four hit singles. The lead-off, "Cadillac Style", went to No. 3 in late 1991 and early 1992, followed by the title track at No. 12, "Yard Sale" at No. 17, and "Anywhere but Here" at No. 10. Kershaw was initially reluctant to release "Cadillac Style" because he felt that it was not suitable for his style; however, his co-producer, Buddy Cannon, convinced him to give the song a chance. Kershaw's often honky-tonk material and singing voice led to critical comparisons to George Jones, and he covered one of Jones's early singles, "What Am I Worth", on his debut as well.

In 1993, Kershaw received an initial nomination for the Academy of Country Music Award for New Male Vocalist of the Year. He was nominated alongside Billy Ray Cyrus, Tracy Lawrence, Chris LeDoux and Collin Raye; Cyrus, Lawrence and Raye would make the final three.

Kershaw's second album, Haunted Heart, followed in 1993. Its lead-off single, "She Don't Know She's Beautiful", became his only Number One hit, in April of that year. Following it were the title track, the Dennis Linde–penned "Queen of My Double-Wide Trailer", and "I Can't Reach Her Anymore", all of which hit the Top 10 as well. Although Kershaw had been told by others that radio audiences might not identify with the subject matter on "Queen of My Double-Wide Trailer", Kershaw wanted to release the song because he had an experience similar to its story line. Like his debut, Haunted Heart was a platinum album. In mid-1994, Kershaw also covered the Lynyrd Skynyrd song "I Know a Little" on the tribute album Skynyrd Frynds, which included country music covers of Skynyrd songs. Also in 1994, Kershaw contributed the song "Fire and Rain" to the AIDS benefit album Red Hot + Country, produced by the Red Hot Organization.

Feelin' Good Train was Kershaw's third album, released later in 1994. This album also produced four hits, including two consecutive No. 2's in "National Working Woman's Holiday" and "Third Rate Romance" (the latter a cover of the Amazing Rhythm Aces hit from 1975), with the No. 27 "Southbound" and No. 18 "If You're Gonna Walk, I'm Gonna Crawl" following in 1995. The album included a duet with George Jones on "Never Bit a Bullet Like This", which had previously been released on Jones's 1993 album High-Tech Redneck. Feelin' Good Train was certified gold. It was followed by a Christmas album, Christmas Time's A-Comin', and Kershaw's first greatest-hits package, Greatest Hits, Volume 1, both in 1995. The latter produced a No. 47 single in "Your Tattoo" (written by Kostas and Jack Tempchin), the first single of Kershaw's career not to reach the Top 40.

=== Mid-late 1990s ===
Kershaw's fourth studio album, the gold-certified Politics, Religion and Her, was issued in 1996. It produced Top 10 hits in "Meant to Be" and "Vidalia", the latter of which Kershaw also considered a risky song, saying, "If radio will play this one more than twice—so people can get the story and learn what a Vidalia onion is—it'll be a smash." These songs were followed by "Fit to Be Tied Down" and the title track, both of which hit the Top 30. Also included on Politics, Religion and Her were covers of Chuck Berry's "Memphis, Tennessee" and Sammy Johns' "Chevy Van". The same year, Kershaw briefly took ownership of a NASCAR Busch series team (now Xfinity Series).

Labor of Love was issued later in 1997 as his fifth album. Unlike his previous albums, this one was predominantly composed of ballads. It produced a No. 2 (and final US Top 10 hit) in "Love of My Life", and although none of the other three singles ("Matches", "Honky Tonk America" and "One Day Left to Live") reached higher than No. 22, the album was nonetheless certified platinum. His next album, Maybe Not Tonight, brought a Top 20 duet with Lorrie Morgan.

Kershaw stated that he enjoyed working with Morgan on the song, telling Country Weekly magazine, "I knew our vocals would match up… Plus, we have fun together. We're friends and we have been friends for a long time." "Maybe Not Tonight" was commercially less successful than its predecessors, however, and it became the first album of Kershaw's career not to achieve an RIAA certification. Following "Maybe Not Tonight" were the singles "When You Love Someone" and "Me and Maxine", both of which peaked in the thirties. "Louisiana Hot Sauce", the final release from Maybe Not Tonight, was also the first single of his career not to enter the charts.

In 2000, Kershaw released an album of cover songs, Covers the Hits. This album consisted of ten cover songs that Kershaw had recorded in his career. Some of the songs, such as the single "Third Rate Romance", were previously found on Kershaw's studio albums, while others came from various tribute albums (such as Skynyrd Frynds) to which he had contributed. Covers the Hits also included a rendition of Dr. Hook's "A Little Bit More", a previously unreleased cover which Kershaw had recorded during the sessions for Labor of Love.

=== 2000s ===
By 2001, Kershaw and Morgan had married. The two recorded a vocal duet album in 2001 entitled I Finally Found Someone (the title track being a cover of the Barbra Streisand/Bryan Adams duet). This album was less successful commercially, with its only Top 40 hit being the No. 39 "He Drinks Tequila". Shortly afterward, a second 'greatest hits' package was released, and Kershaw left Mercury's roster.

In 2003, Kershaw signed to Audium Entertainment to release the album I Want My Money Back. This album produced a No. 33-peaking in its title track, but the second single "I've Never Been Anywhere" fell short of the Top 40. The third and final single, "Beer, Bait & Ammo" (which failed to chart), was previously recorded and written by Kevin Fowler on his 2000 debut album of the same name, and would later be recorded by Mark Chesnutt on his 2004 album Savin' the Honky Tonk.

After Audium closed its Nashville division, Kershaw signed to Category 5 Records, then a newly established independent label, in 2006. His first release for the label and first chart single in three years, "Tennessee Girl", fell three spaces short of the Top 40 that year. It was the first release from his 2006 album Honky Tonk Boots. The album's only other single, a cover of Mel McDaniel's Number One hit "Baby's Got Her Blue Jeans On", failed to chart, and financial difficulties caused the label to close in 2007.

In 2008, Sammy Kershaw was inducted into The Louisiana Music Hall of Fame in honor of his career achievements and was also inducted into the Louisiana Songwriters Association Hall Of Fame in 2010.

Kershaw's first single in two years, "Real People", was released in late 2008 in the Boomerville/Big Hit label. However, the single failed to chart. His tenth studio album, Better Than I Used to Be, was released on August 31, 2010.

=== Political activity ===
Kershaw had become increasingly interested in politics. On June 13, 2007, he announced his candidacy for lieutenant governor of Louisiana in the October 20 jungle primary. The position was held by the incumbent Democrat, Mitch Landrieu. Kershaw also faced a second Republican candidate, State Representative Gary Beard of Baton Rouge, an engineer first elected to the State House in a 2001 special election. Kershaw finished second with 30 percent of the vote, but Landrieu won re-election with a majority on the first ballot.

Watching his state embroiled in the Gulf Oil Spill in April 2010, Kershaw, a Lafayette resident, became the official spokesperson for Protect Our Coastline, a non-profit dedicated to providing relief to the fishermen and shrimpers affected most by the spill.

On August 28, 2010, Kershaw announced his second bid for lieutenant governor in the October 2 special election to replace Mitch Landrieu, who left office in May after being elected mayor of New Orleans. Kershaw's intraparty rivals included state Republican chair Roger F. Villere Jr. of Metairie, St. Tammany Parish president Kevin Davis of Slidell, and Secretary of State Jay Dardenne of Baton Rouge. Kershaw polled 19 percent and carried 31 of the 64 parishes (more than any other candidate). However, he finished third in overall votes behind Dardenne and Democrat Caroline Fayard. Kershaw endorsed fellow Republican Dardenne in the runoff election, joining him at campaign events, and giving Dardenne a "bear hug" at his victory celebration.

In the 2011 race for lieutenant governor, Kershaw endorsed Dardenne's opponent, fellow Republican Billy Nungesser. Dardenne ultimately defeated Nungesser 53%-47%.

=== 2010s and Beyond ===
Kershaw continues touring throughout the year with his band, as well as performances with his often sold-out acoustic "Roots and Boots" tour, which has featured himself onstage with other artists including Aaron Tippin, Joe Diffie, Pam Tillis, Darryl Worley and Collin Raye.

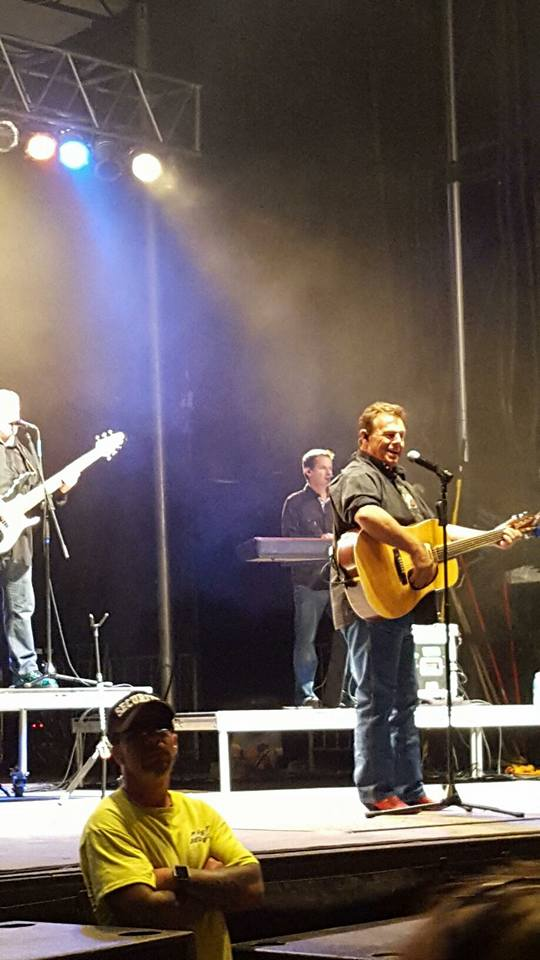
Sammy Kershaw live in concert, with band members Steve Farmer (piano) and Robert Wright (bass guitar), Norway, Michigan - July 3, 2016

In November 2026, Kershaw garnered significant attention when he posted on his social media pages that he and his wife had been denied permission to walk the red carpet at the 60th Annual Country Music Association Awards after being "strung along" by the organization for months. The post quickly went viral and several artists voiced their support for Kershaw including Riley Green, Carly Pearce, Jake Owen, and Pam Tillis, while Rodney Atkins subsequently claimed that his request had also been denied. In an article discussing the controversy, writers from Rolling Stone pointed out that it is possible that Kershaw simply did not meet the requirements to walk the red carpet. The CMA later released a statement on November 9, commenting that they were "deeply sorry anyone felt excluded," and were "committed to keep listening and finding ways to make sure all artists feel welcome and at home". They also stated that they were in touch with Kershaw's team in order to "[continue] the conversation".

== Discography ==
Studio albums

- Don't Go Near the Water (1991)
- Business Is Pleasure (1992)
- Haunted Heart (1993)
- Feelin' Good Train (1994)
- Christmas Time's A-Comin' (1994)
- Politics, Religion and Her (1996)
- Labor of Love (1997)
- Maybe Not Tonight (1999)
- I Finally Found Someone (2001)
- I Want My Money Back (2003)
- Honky Tonk Boots (2006)
- Better Than I Used to Be (2010)
- A Sammy Klaus Christmas (2012)
- All in the Same Boat (2013)
- Do You Know Me: A Tribute to George Jones (2014)
- I Won't Back Down (2015)
- The Blues Got Me (2016)
- Swamp Poppin' (2017)
- Cross Road Blues (2024)

== Awards and nominations ==
=== TNN/Music City News Country Awards ===
Year	Nominee / work	Award	Result
1993	Sammy Kershaw	Star of Tomorrow	Nominated
1994	Sammy Kershaw	Star of Tomorrow	Nominated

=== Country Music Association Awards ===
Year	Nominee / work	Award	Result
1993	Sammy Kershaw	Horizon Award	Nominated
