= Buddy Cannon =

American singer-songwriter (born 1947)

- Born: Murray Franklin Cannon; April 20, 1947 (age 79)
- Origin: Lexington, Tennessee, US
- Genre: Country
- Occupations: Songwriter; Record producer
- Years active: 1970s–present
- Website: buddycannon.com

Buddy Cannon (born April 20, 1947 in Lexington, Tennessee) is an American country music songwriter and record producer active since the 1970s best known for his work with Kenny Chesney and Willie Nelson.

== Career ==
Cannon began working in Nashville as a bass player in the 1970s, initially playing in Bob Luman's band before being hired by Mel Tillis to play in Tillis' band and write for his publishing company, with Tillis recording several Cannon songs over the next 11 years, including his 1978 hit, "I Believe in You". In the 1980s, Vern Gosdin had success with songs written or co-written by Cannon, including "Dream of Me" (1981), "Set 'Em Up Joe" (1988), and "I'm Still Crazy" (1989). In 1990, George Strait had a number 1 hit with “I've Come to Expect It from You”, co-written by Cannon. Other artists who have recorded hit songs written or co-written by Cannon include Billy Ray Cyrus and Craig Morgan. Along with Bill Anderson and Jamey Johnson, Cannon co-wrote Strait's 2006 single "Give It Away", which won the Country Music Association's Song of the Year award.

While working in A&R at Mercury Records Nashville in the early 1990s, Cannon signed and developed artists including Billy Ray Cyrus and Shania Twain. Cannon became interested in producing, and produced Sammy Kershaw's debut album in 1991. In 1997, Cannon began a longtime relationship as a producer for Kenny Chesney. He has produced albums by artists including Chely Wright, Reba McEntire, George Jones, Louise Mandrell, Merle Haggard, and Alison Krauss. Since 2012, Cannon has produced fifteen of Willie Nelson's albums and co-written numerous Nelson songs.

Cannon was awarded the Academy of Country Music's Producer of the Year award in 2006, and was honored by the United States House of Representatives for his contributions as a record producer in 2008.

Cannon was inducted into the Nashville Songwriters Hall of Fame in 2021. In 2024, it was announced that he would be presented with the Nashville Songwriters Association International president's award.

== Personal life ==
Cannon is the father of singer Melonie Cannon and songwriter Marla Cannon-Goodman.
