= The Best of Elvis Costello – The Man =

- Original Telstar Records cover

Greatest hits album by Elvis Costello
- Released: April 1985
- Recorded: 1977–1984
- Genres: New wave, punk rock, power pop
- Length: 58:06
- Label: Telstar
- Producers: Nick Lowe, Geoff Emerick, Roger Bechirian, Clive Langer, Alan Winstanley

Elvis Costello chronology
Goodbye Cruel World (1984)	The Best of Elvis Costello – The Man (1985)	King of America (1986)

Singles from The Best of Elvis Costello – The Man
- 1. "Green Shirt" Released: April 1985

Alternative cover
- 1986 Demon Records rerelease, with cover art taken during the Taking Liberties photo shoot.

Alternative cover
- The cover of the Columbia Records release crediting the Attractions

Professional ratings
Review scores
Source	Rating
AllMusic	4/5 stars
Encyclopedia of Popular Music	4/5 stars
Robert Christgau	A−
The New Rolling Stone Album Guide	3/5 stars

The Best of Elvis Costello – The Man is a 1985 compilation album by English musician Elvis Costello initially offered in the UK by Telstar Records via TV advertising.

Later the same year, Columbia Records released the album in North America and Thailand with a slightly different track listing. This time, his back up band, The Attractions, are given credit, as it was renamed The Best of Elvis Costello and the Attractions. The CD included two additional tracks that appear on neither version: "(The Angels Wanna Wear My) Red Shoes" and "Man Out of Time". A 22 track video tape added "Possession", "Sweet Dreams", "Let Them All Talk", "You Little Fool" and "Love for Tender".

It was rereleased in the UK in 1986 by Costello’s real record company, Demon Records, with different cover art taken during the Taking Liberties cover shoot (this time the negative is not reversed). It is out of print in North America since Costello parted ways with Columbia, and has essentially been replaced by The Very Best of Elvis Costello and The Attractions 1977–86.

== Track listing ==
=== The Best of Elvis Costello – The Man ===
All tracks are written by Elvis Costello unless otherwise indicated.

Side one
No.	Title	Original Album	Length
1.	"Watching the Detectives"	(Single only)	3:41
2.	"Oliver's Army"	Armed Forces	2:58
3.	"Alison"	My Aim Is True	3:22
4.	"Accidents Will Happen"	Armed Forces	3:00
5.	"Pump It Up"	This Year's Model	3:17
6.	"High Fidelity"	Get Happy!!	2:28
7.	"Pills and Soap"	Punch the Clock	3:43
8.	"(I Don't Want to Go to) Chelsea"	This Year's Model	3:06
9.	"New Lace Sleeves"	Trust	3:45

Side two
No.	Title	Writer(s)	Original Album	Length
10.	"A Good Year for the Roses"	Jerry Chesnut	Almost Blue	3:07
11.	"I Can't Stand Up for Falling Down"	Homer Banks, Allen Jones	Get Happy!!	2:06
12.	"Clubland"		Trust	3:41
13.	"Beyond Belief"		Imperial Bedroom	2:32
14.	"New Amsterdam"		Get Happy!!	2:12
15.	"Green Shirt"		Armed Forces	2:42
16.	"Everyday I Write the Book"		Punch the Clock	3:47
17.	"I Wanna Be Loved"	Farnell Jenkins	Goodbye Cruel World	3:50
18.	"Shipbuilding"		Punch the Clock	4:49
Total length:				58:06

=== The Best of Elvis Costello and the Attractions ===
Side one
No.	Title	Writer(s)	Original Album	Length
1.	"Alison"		My Aim Is True	3:22
2.	"Watching the Detectives"		My Aim Is True	3:41
3.	"(What's So Funny 'Bout) Peace, Love and Understanding?"	Nick Lowe	Armed Forces	3:31
4.	"Oliver's Army"		Armed Forces	2:58
5.	"Pump It Up"		This Year's Model	3:17
6.	"Accidents Will Happen"		Armed Forces	3:00
7.	"Radio Radio"		This Year's Model	3:06
8.	"I Can't Stand Up for Falling Down"	Banks, Jones	Get Happy!!

Side two
No.	Title	Writer(s)	Original Album	Length
9.	"Almost Blue"		Imperial Bedroom	2:47
10.	"Beyond Belief"		Imperial Bedroom	2:32
11.	"Clubland"		Trust	3:41
12.	"Watch Your Step"		Trust	2:58
13.	"Shipbuilding"		Punch the Clock	4:49
14.	"I Wanna Be Loved"	Farnell Jenkins	Goodbye Cruel World	3:50
15.	"Everyday I Write the Book"		Punch the Clock	3:47
16.	"The Only Flame in Town"		Goodbye Cruel World	3:32
Total length:				53:07

CD
No.	Title	Writer(s)	Original Album	Length
1.	"Alison"		My Aim Is True	3:22
2.	"Watching the Detectives"		My Aim Is True	3:41
3.	"(What's So Funny 'Bout) Peace, Love and Understanding?"	Nick Lowe	Armed Forces	3:31
4.	"Oliver's Army"		Armed Forces	2:57
5.	"(The Angels Wanna Wear My) Red Shoes"		My Aim Is True	2:45
6.	"Pump It Up"		Armed Forces	3:16
7.	"Accidents Will Happen"		Armed Forces	3:01
8.	"Radio Radio"		This Year's Model	3:06
9.	"I Can't Stand Up for Falling Down"		Get Happy!!	2:06
10.	"A Good Year for the Roses"	Jerry Chesnut	Almost Blue	3:07
11.	""Almost Blue""		Imperial Bedroom	2:46
12.	"Beyond Belief"		Imperial Bedroom	2:32
13.	"Man Out of Time"		Imperial Bedroom	5:27
14.	"Clubland"		Trust	3:42
15.	"Watch Your Step"		Trust	2:57
16.	"Shipbuilding"		Punch the Clock	4:49
17.	"I Wanna Be Loved"	Jenkins	Goodbye Cruel World	3:50
18.	"Everyday I Write the Book"		Punch the Clock	3:47
19.	"The Only Flame in Town"		Goodbye Cruel World	3:32
Total length:				64:25

== Personnel ==
- Elvis Costello – vocals, guitar
- Steve Nieve – keyboards
- Bruce Thomas – bass
- Pete Thomas – drums, percussion

=== Additional personnel ===
- Caron Wheeler – vocals
- Claudia Fontaine – vocals
- Clover – various instruments
- Chet Baker – trumpet
- Andrew Bodnar – bass
- Steve Goulding – drums
- Daryl Hall – vocals
- Green Gartside – vocals

== Charts ==
Chart (1985–86)	Peak position
US Billboard 200	116

== Certifications ==
Region	Certification	Certified units/sales
United States (RIAA)	Platinum	1,000,000^{^}
^{^} Shipments figures based on certification alone.
