= Beyond Belief (song) =

- 1985 B-side label

Song by Elvis Costello and the Attractions

from the album Imperial Bedroom
- Released: 2 July 1982
- Recorded: 1982
- Studio: AIR, London
- Genre: New wave
- Length: 2:34
- Label: F-Beat (UK); Columbia (US)
- Songwriter(s): Elvis Costello
- Producer(s): Geoff Emerick

Elvis Costello singles chronology
"The Only Flame in Town" (1984)	"Green Shirt" / "Beyond Belief" (1985)	"The People's Limousine" (1985)

"Beyond Belief" is a song written by new wave musician Elvis Costello and recorded by Costello with his backing band the Attractions. The song appeared on Costello's 1982 album, Imperial Bedroom. With vague, hazy lyrics, "Beyond Belief" features an active drum line from a hungover Pete Thomas as well as a frantic vocal line Costello composed after the backing track was completed.

Though not released as a single, "Beyond Belief" appeared on several Costello compilation albums and remains a fan favorite. It has been lauded by critics and has made several appearances in Costello's live setlist.

== Background ==
"Beyond Belief" originated from an earlier song that Costello wrote, entitled "The Land of Give and Take". Sonically, the song represented an attempt by Costello to incorporate elements of the "big open-spaced music" from U2 and Echo and the Bunnymen that was popular at the time. Costello further described it as a "ranting kind of song", stating, "I was consciously writing words that didn't make sense — to make a blurred picture, because I was living a blurred life". Such a lyrical approach meant that "there [are] three or four points of view going on at the same time" throughout.

"Beyond Belief" was radically rearranged in the studio, largely in response to drummer Pete Thomas' energetic performance. Per Costello,

Pete Thomas arrived at the studio straight from a night of carousing, he confounded all of us by turning in the single inventive take of "Beyond Belief" that transformed the song into the opening track of the record. The strength of Pete's performance meant that I was able to consider a more ambitious and confidential vocal approach. I re-wrote the song over the existing backing track, achieving a more coherent structure.

In his autobiography, Costello noted that this restructuring of the song's structure over an existing backing track was "unprecedented" for him, concluding that the novelty of such a form of construction was a "real liberation". This strategy influenced Costello to reconsider the vocal lines of other songs on Imperial Bedroom, leading to similar tweaks throughout the sessions.

== Release ==
"Beyond Belief" was released as the opening track of Costello's 1982 album Imperial Bedroom. The song was not released as a single, though it later appeared as a B-side on the 1985 single for "Green Shirt". Costello later lamented this, noting that "Beyond Belief" would have been a "bolder" choice for a single than the album's first single, "You Little Fool".

Since its release, "Beyond Belief" has been included on several Costello compilation albums, including The Best of Elvis Costello and the Attractions, Girls Girls Girls, and The Best of Elvis Costello: The First 10 Years. Stereogum commented, "If there are any Imperial Bedroom songs casual fans know beyond 'Almost Blue,' they're 'Man Out of Time' and 'Beyond Belief,' as both have rightly been included on various career anthologies." The song also served as the title for a now-defunct Costello fanzine.

== Critical reception ==
"Beyond Belief" has attracted critical acclaim from music writers. In a 1982 review of Imperial Bedroom, Simon Hills of Record Mirror praised the Costello's "silky yet muscular voice" on the track. Rolling Stone singled out the opening lyric of "History repeats the old conceits/The glib replies, the same defeats" as being "sung from the inside".

Retrospective writers have similarly expressed admiration for "Beyond Belief". PopMatters praised the song for its "masterful [vocal] performance from Costello" as well as Thomas's "manic drumming." Stereogum similarly singled out the song because it "does deliver one of the great anxious Costello vocal recordings." Washington City Paper stated, "Amid the current controversy over whether a songwriter is worthy of recognition among the pantheon of Serious Literature, 'Beyond Belief' is certainly as good an exemplar for The Pop Song As High Art as any."

Paste Magazine ranked "Beyond Belief" number 19 on their list of the top 20 Elvis Costello songs, writing, "Few songs set out so confusingly sprawling, and this introduction to the Attractions' abilities to adapt to Costello’s increasingly diverse muses was hugely impressive."

== Live history ==
Since its release, "Beyond Belief" has appeared regularly in Costello's live setlist, though the song "had to be stripped of many of the [studio] embellishments" as with many others from Imperial Bedroom.
