= The Best of Elvis Costello: The First 10 Years =

Greatest hits album by Elvis Costello
- Released: 1 May 2007
- Recorded: 1977–1986
- Genre: New wave, Rock
- Length: 1:18:36
- Label: Hip-O Records (US); UM^{3} (International)

Elvis Costello chronology
The River in Reverse (2006)	The Best of Elvis Costello: The First 10 Years (2007)	Rock And Roll Music (2007)

The Best of Elvis Costello: The First 10 Years is a compilation album by Elvis Costello released in 2007, consisting of songs taken from the early years of his discography, compiled by Costello himself.

== Reception ==
Professional ratings
Review scores
Source	Rating
Allmusic	4.5/5 stars

Stephen Thomas Erlewine of AllMusic says that this collection "is quite similar to the last previous single-disc collection, the 1994 Ryko/Demon set The Very Best of Elvis Costello and the Attractions", with 19 of the 22 tracks the same. The three omitted tracks are "New Amsterdam", "Watch Your Step", and "Love Field." Those songs are replaced by different choices in this set with "New Lace Sleeves", "Almost Blue", and "(The Angels Wanna Wear My) Red Shoes", resulting in the Goodbye Cruel World album being unrepresented on the new compilation. "With these three songs rubbing shoulders with...all the other usual suspects, The Best of Elvis Costello: The First 10 Years winds up being the best single-disc summary and introduction to Costello's prime years."

== Track listing ==
All tracks are written by Elvis Costello, except where noted.

No.	Title	Originally from	Length
1.	"(The Angels Wanna Wear My) Red Shoes"	My Aim Is True, 1977	2:49
2.	"Alison"	My Aim Is True	3:24
3.	"Watching The Detectives (Single Version)"	My Aim Is True	3:47
4.	"(I Don't Want to Go to) Chelsea"	This Year's Model, 1978	3:11
5.	"Pump It Up"	This Year's Model	3:18
6.	"Radio, Radio"	This Year's Model	3:07
7.	"Accidents Will Happen"	Armed Forces, 1979	3:01
8.	"Oliver's Army"	Armed Forces	3:00
9.	"(What's So Funny 'Bout) Peace, Love & Understanding (Nick Lowe)"	Armed Forces	3:33
10.	"I Can't Stand Up For Falling Down (Homer Banks/Allen Jones)"	Get Happy!!, 1980	2:08
11.	"High Fidelity"	Get Happy!!	2:29
12.	"Clubland"	Trust, 1981	3:45
13.	"New Lace Sleeves"	Trust	3:48
14.	"A Good Year for the Roses (Jerry Chesnut)"	Almost Blue, 1981	3:09
15.	"Beyond Belief"	Imperial Bedroom, 1982	2:35
16.	"Man Out of Time"	Imperial Bedroom	5:29
17.	"Almost Blue"	Imperial Bedroom	2:49
18.	"Everyday I Write the Book"	Punch the Clock, 1983	3:55
19.	"Shipbuilding (Elvis Costello/Clive Langer)"	Punch the Clock	4:53
20.	"Brilliant Mistake"	King of America, 1986	3:45
21.	"Indoor Fireworks"	King of America	4:10
22.	"I Want You"	Blood & Chocolate, 1986	6:42

== Chart positions ==
Chart (2007)	Peak position
US Billboard 200	110
