= Green Shirt =

Single by Elvis Costello and the Attractions

from the album Armed Forces
- B-side: "Beyond Belief"
- Released: April 1985 (single); January 1979 (album)
- Recorded: August – September 1978
- Genre: New wave
- Label: F-Beat (single); Stiff (album)
- Songwriter(s): Elvis Costello
- Producer(s): Nick Lowe

Elvis Costello and the Attractions singles chronology
"The Only Flame in Town" (1984)	"Green Shirt" (1985)	"The People's Limousine" (1985)

"Green Shirt" is a song written by new wave musician Elvis Costello and recorded by Costello with his backing band the Attractions. The song appeared on Costello's 1979 third album, Armed Forces. Lyrically inspired by the influence of the National Front and the Quisling Clinic in Wisconsin, "Green Shirt" features a vocal recorded by Costello after a "night of carousing".

"Green Shirt" was not released as a single at the time of its 1979 release, but in 1985 it saw single release to promote The Man: The Best of Elvis Costello. The single reached number 68 in Britain. Since its release, the song has been lauded by critics as one of Costello's best album tracks and has made several appearances in Costello's live setlist.

== Background ==
"Green Shirt" was described by Elvis Costello as "a paranoid song that I wrote ... about the simplification of seductive signals, the bedroom eyes that lead to tyranny". The song was lyrically inspired by the Quisling Clinic, a building in Madison, Wisconsin that Costello reportedly saw and wrote down the name of while driving past. Costello later wrote that, while he had only ever associated the name "Quisling" with Norwegian fascist Vidkun Quisling, the combination of "Quisling" and "Clinic" had "conjured up some kind of Boys from Brazil nightmare". Costello also cited the rise of the National Front in Britain as inspiration.

The first recording of "Green Shirt" was an acoustic demo with alternate lyrics that would appear on later editions of This Year's Model. The final version of the song would ultimately appear on Costello's 1979 album Armed Forces. Costello recorded the vocals for "Green Shirt" after what he described as a "late night of carousing". This prevented him from raising his voice on the recording, much to the chagrin of producer Nick Lowe. Costello recalled,

I got no sympathy from Nick Lowe. He just pushed me into the vocal booth with a carton of cold orange juice, which I held against my brow rather than risk drinking it. It was hard to keep my voice from shaking with my pulse racing at my temples. I asked the control room for that awful juddering Minimoog and the rat-a-tat-a-tat of the snare drum to be turned down in my headphones. I was almost afraid of my own breath, but fear, of course, was the quality that song most required.

== Release and reception ==
"Green Shirt" was first released on Costello's 1979 album Armed Forces. The song was not released as a single at the time. In 1985, the song was released as a single to promote the compilation album The Man: The Best of Elvis Costello. The B-side was "Beyond Belief", a song from Costello's 1982 album Imperial Bedroom. The single was a moderate success in the UK, reaching number 68 on the charts. The release was accompanied by a newly created music video that featured clips from previous Elvis Costello music videos. A writer for Sounds named the release "Single of the Week" in May 1985, writing, "An obvious choice, but why fight the irresistible? ... This is classic Costello ... simple, tense, beguiling — and sublimely arranged with a marvelous drum pattern, a crescendo of string-synth and even a trumpet fanfare on the fade."

"Green Shirt" has since been praised by critics as one of Costello's best album tracks. City Pages named the song one of Costello's 30 best deep cuts, praising the "buoyant bounce underpinning some of Costello's darkest lyrics" on the track. Tony Clayton-Lea of the Irish Times described the song as one of Costello's "back-catalogue gems" and praised the "staccato backdrop" and "spooky vocal". Paul Sexton of uDiscoverMusic called the track "brooding" and named it one of the highlights of Armed Forces, while Matt LeMay of Pitchfork called the song a "near-classic" that was "hindered" by the album's "smoother production".

== Live performances ==
"Green Shirt" has become a mainstay of Costello's live setlist in recent years. Costello performed the song live at Heatwave in 1980, a performance which Paste Magazine described as "taken at a faster clip than the ... studio recording". Jacob Pucci of The Post-Standard described a live performance of the song at the Turning Stone Resort Casino from 2016 as "energetic" and "synth-heavy". Dave Mckenna of the Washington Post recalled that "'Green Shirt' ... had some of the harder core fans singing along while throwing their arms skyward in deliriousness" during a 2018 concert at the DAR Constitution Hall. At a 2018 show in Vancouver, Costello sardonically described "Green Shirt" as "a song written last century".

== Charts ==
Chart (1985)	Peak position
UK Singles (OCC)	68
