= Man Out of Time =

Single by Elvis Costello and the Attractions

from the album Imperial Bedroom
- B-side: "Town Cryer"
- Released: 23 July 1982
- Recorded: 1981–1982
- Studio: AIR, London
- Length: 5:26
- Label: F-Beat (UK)
- Songwriter: Elvis Costello
- Producer: Geoff Emerick

Elvis Costello and the Attractions singles chronology
"You Little Fool" (1982)	"Man Out of Time" (1982)	"From Head to Toe" (1982)

"Man Out of Time" is a song written by new wave musician Elvis Costello and performed by Elvis Costello and the Attractions on their 1982 album, Imperial Bedroom. With lyrics detailing a political scandal, "Man Out of Time" features a lush arrangement that was a conscious departure from the aggressive style of Costello's previous work.

The song was released as the second single from Imperial Bedroom, reaching number 58 in the United Kingdom. The song has since been lauded by critics, some of whom name the track as Costello's greatest song.

== Background ==
Costello thought of the song's central lyric, "But will you still love a man out of time?", while on a tour bus in Sweden in 1981, writing the rest of the song in a Scottish hotel during the same tour. At a lyrical level, "Man Out of Time" features lyrics about what the Guardian describes as a "cabinet minister hiding out from a sex scandal". Elvis Costello wrote "Man Out of Time" as a synthesis of his personal ambition and contemporary political developments. He explained,

A lot of songs are about the sort of disgust with your own self. There were a lot of things that I wasn’t very happy with during that time. I wanted songs to blow up the world. I had mad ambitions. Not mad as in "ambition to be famous". I never wanted that. That just came as an accident of it all. But somehow you look at yourself and you're not happy with what you see. I didn't want to write a self-regarding song, so I cast it in the clothes of political intrigue and what was going on in the world at that time. There was a famous political scandal in England going on then. It all sort of got wrapped up in the song. Sometimes a song will have a personal meaning and a public meaning. "Man Out of Time" is one of those.

In an interview with The New York Times, Costello explained his attitude toward the English aristocracy, stating,

I do tend to think there's a lot of decadence and moral weakness among people in positions of power. Traditionally, the aristocracy in England has been decadent and immoral. There's always a lot of intrigue, government scandals, like the Profumo affair. None of my songs are literally about that or any other particular event, but some of them have that flavor. The more personal songs are either imaginary scenarios, observations of other people, or observations of myself. Most of the really vitriolic songs I've written have been observations of myself.

== Recording ==
Unlike many of Costello's previous singles, "Man Out of Time" features a slower, less intense arrangement. Aside from the noisier sections that bookend the song, "Man Out of Time" is, according to AllMusic's Rick Anderson, "lush and heartbreakingly pretty." Costello initially drove the Attractions to perform the song aggressively, but this original arrangement was largely abandoned and edited into the opening and closing sections of the song by producer Geoff Emerick. The bulk of the song came from a one take performance that Costello later described as "among the best that the Attractions and I ever caught in a single take". Emerick's use of Fairchild valve compressors on the song resulted in what Costello described as "a sense of the music pushing back against some intolerable weight". Costello recalled,

Originally, it was a very uptempo, aggressive song. I had made this mistake several times. At the time of Imperial Bedroom, I came to terms with the fact that I was sacrificing the power of certain songs to this mad pursuit of tempo. Everything had to be delivered forcefully. I don't know whether it was just a natural process or, literally, cumulative exhaustion of what were very intense years. "Man Out of Time" is the one time I said, "No, stop. Let's play this at the right tempo." And we went for this bigger, more open sound. I think it's a really good record.

== Release ==
In addition to its release on Imperial Bedroom in July 1982, "Man Out of Time" was released as a single, following the same album's "You Little Fool". The B-sides to the single were an alternate version of Imperial Bedroom closer "Town Cryer" and the song "Imperial Bedroom". The single reached number 58 on the British charts.

According to Costello, "You Little Fool" was chosen over "Man Out of Time" to be the album's first single due to the former being more commercial; he recalled, "'You Little Fool,' which is one of the brightest-sounding tracks until you listen to lyrics, was released purely because it had a hook. I kept saying, 'Well, "Man Out of Time" is what the album is about, that's the heart of the record. You can hear that, can't you?' Of course, in those days, the people who understood what you were saying at the record label, those people didn't have any power."

The song has since appeared on several compilation albums, including The Best of Elvis Costello and the Attractions (CD version), Girls Girls Girls, The Very Best of Elvis Costello and The Attractions 1977–86, The Very Best of Elvis Costello, and The Best of Elvis Costello: The First 10 Years.

== Reception ==
"Man Out of Time" has seen critical acclaim since its release, being ranked by NME as the tenth-best song of 1982. Anderson described the track as "a song that resonates deeply on an emotional level regardless of whatever its literal meaning may be."

Jim Beviglia of American Songwriter named the song Costello's best, praising the Attraction's performance as "exquisite" and commended the song's lyrical "brilliance", stating, "A precious few of us have been embroiled in a public scandal, but the bereft emotions of the song are recognizable to all". Dave Lifton of Ultimate Classic Rock also named the song as the best Elvis Costello song, praising its "lush arrangement that features the Attractions playing at their best". Jeremy Allen of The Guardian named the song one of the ten best Elvis Costello songs, calling the track the "centerpiece" of Imperial Bedroom and stating "Costello sometimes overreaches, trying to accommodate too much in a song, but not here, somehow". The Daily Telegraph's Martin Chilton ranked the song number four on his top 40 list of best Costello songs. Cash Box said Costello "handles this ultra-melodic material with as much grace as he treated his harder-edged songs with boiling anger." Vincent Arrieta of the Dallas Observer named the song as one of Costello's ten best deep cuts, calling the track "the centerpiece of what is arguably Elvis Costello's best record."

== Charts ==
Chart (1982)	Peak position
UK Singles (OCC)	58
