= Almost Blue (song) =

Song by Elvis Costello

Song by Elvis Costello and the Attractions

from the album Imperial Bedroom
- Released: 2 July 1982
- Recorded: 1982
- Studio: AIR (London, UK)
- Genre: Traditional pop
- Length: 2:50
- Label: F-Beat
- Songwriter: Elvis Costello
- Producer: Geoff Emerick

"Almost Blue" is a song recorded by English group Elvis Costello and the Attractions from their sixth studio album, Imperial Bedroom (1982). Written by Costello and produced by Geoff Emerick, the track shares the name of the group's previous 1981 studio album. It was released on 2 July 1982 along with the rest of Imperial Bedroom, and would later be included on side two of The Best of Elvis Costello and the Attractions (1985). A traditional pop song, "Almost Blue" contains lyrics that compare a former relationship to a present one.

"Almost Blue" was noted for being a highlight on Imperial Bedroom; Emerick's production on the track was also singled out by reviewers, who acclaimed his "aftermath" approach towards its composition. The song was covered by several performers, notably Chet Baker in 1987, Gwen Stefani in 1998, and by Costello's wife Diana Krall for her seventh studio album, The Girl in the Other Room (2004).

== Background and composition ==
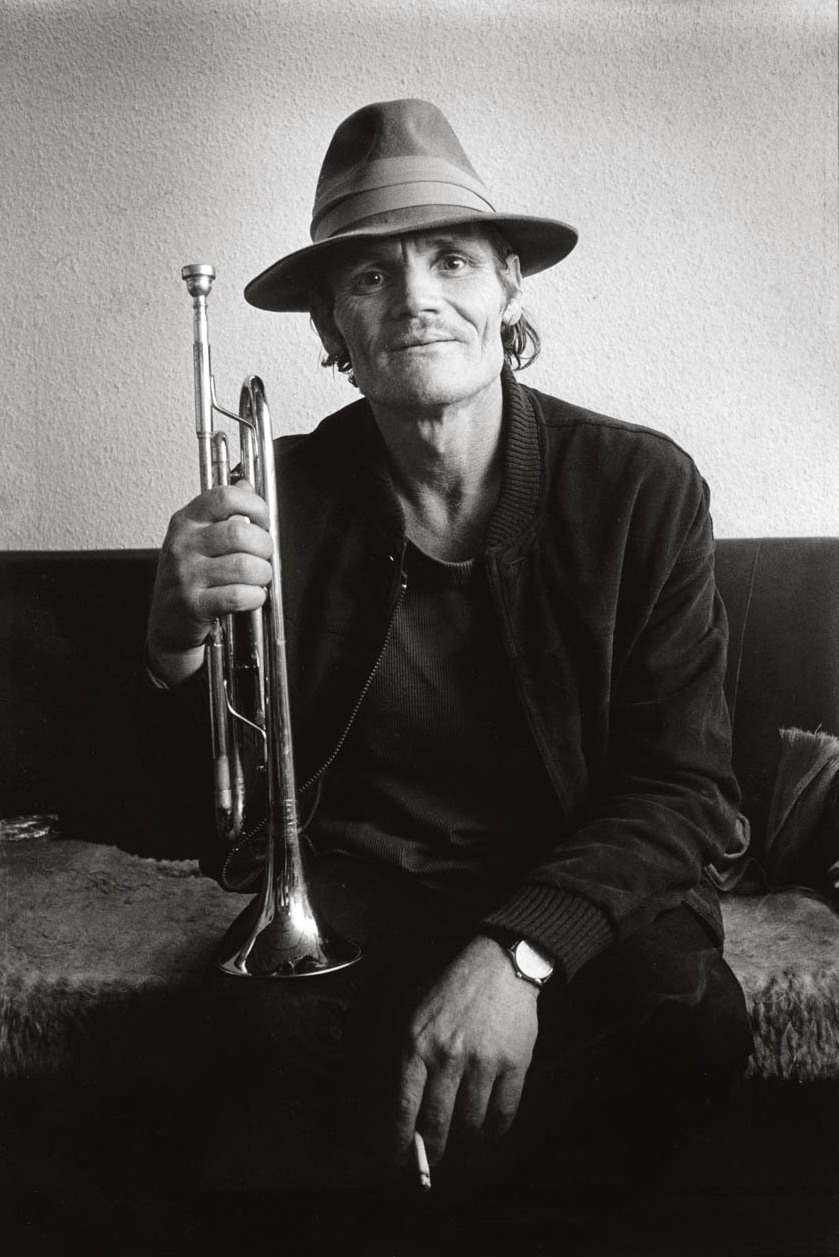
Chet Baker's cover of "The Thrill Is Gone" served as the inspiration and basis for Costello's "Almost Blue".

After listening to Chet Baker's version of the 1931 Ray Henderson/Lew Brown song "The Thrill Is Gone" from the 1954 Pacific Jazz record Chet Baker Sings, Costello became inspired to create similar-sounding music. He noted that the recording's "eeriness" and "haunted" qualities persuaded him to create his own take on it. In a 2015 memoir Costello wrote that Baker's version of the Richie Beirach song Leaving "had provoked my song 'Almost Blue' as much as Chet's recording of the Brown and Henderson song 'The Thrill is Gone.' " Costello wrote the ballad that shared the same name as his previous 1981 studio album, and wrote and recorded it with a "British pop" perspective.

Produced by Geoff Emerick, "Almost Blue" is a traditional pop song, that is written in A minor and is set in time signature of common time with a slower rhythm set at 60 beats per minute. According to the sheet music published at Musicnotes.com by Alfred Publishing, Costello's vocals range from A_{3} to C_{5}, leading instrumentation of piano and guitar. Stylus Magazine's Colin Beckett described its sound as reminiscent to the works of Johnny Hartman and Baker. Lyrically, Costello expresses a "dead past" or "dead relationship" by comparing it to its present state.

== Critical reception ==
"Almost Blue" was well received by music critics. Beckett, writing for Stylus Magazine, called it the "biggest step" that the singer took on Imperial Bedroom. He continued: "It's one of the strongest songs on the album. It has a haunting quality that had never been present in Costello's work." Imperial Bedroom was deemed one of the 100 best albums of the 1980s and one of the top 500 albums of all time by Rolling Stone. Douglas Wolk of Blender described it as one of the songs that every listener should "download". Timothy and Elizabeth Bracy from Stereogum highlighted Emerick's contributions to the track in their article ranking Costello's albums "from worst to best". James E. Perone, in his book The Words and Music of Elvis Costello, cited "Almost Blue" along with two other songs from Imperial Bedroom as a "demonstrat[ion of] Costello's increasingly successful integration of balladry into his palette of vocal techniques".

== Live performances and covers ==
"Almost Blue" has been performed and sung live on several occasions. In July 2004, Costello sang it at the North Sea Jazz Festival alongside 13 of his other solo works. The live edition would later be added to the accompanying live album, titled My Flame Burns Blue (2006). On side two of The Best of Elvis Costello and the Attractions (1985), "Almost Blue" appears in its original format, as displayed on Imperial Bedroom. The recording has also been a number of films since its initial release. Jennifer Jason Leigh performed the song in the 1995 independent film Georgia at a fictitious nightclub. Her take on the track included drums and bass performed by John C. Reilly and Tony Marsico, respectively, and featured a saxophone and harmonica interlude as performed by Jimmy Z. Director Alex Infascelli's 2000 film of the same name, based upon Carlo Lucarelli's 1997 novel, were both inspired by the lyrics of "Almost Blue".

American trumpeter Chet Baker recorded the tune in 1987 for the documentary Let's Get Lost (1989) and it was released on the soundtrack album. He also covered it in concert on June 14, 1987, in Tokyo, creating an extended version totaling seven minutes and fifty-three seconds. After his death in 1988, it was released on his posthumous album Chet Baker in Tokyo (1988). At a 1998 benefit concert for the Walden Woods Project in Concord, Massachusetts, ska musician Gwen Stefani sang it alongside a jazz orchestra. It was later included on the accompanying promotional CD for AT&T customers, titled Stormy Weather (1998). Other renditions were made by Kate Dimbleby and Jimmy Scott for their 1998 albums, Good Vibrations and Holding Back the Years, respectively. The Reputation featured it on their eponymous debut album in 2002, followed with covers performed by Everything but the Girl and Alison Moyet in 2003 and 2004, respectively.

== Diana Krall version ==
"Almost Blue"

Song by Diana Krall

from the album The Girl in the Other Room
- Released: 31 March 2004
- Recorded: 2003–2004
- Studio: Avatar (New York, New York); Capitol, Hollywood
- Length: 4:04
- Label: Verve
- Songwriter: Elvis Costello
- Producers: Diana Krall; Tommy LiPuma

Costello's wife, Canadian singer Diana Krall, recorded a cover of "Almost Blue" for her seventh studio album, The Girl in the Other Room (2004). Both Krall and Tommy LiPuma produced the track, which is over a minute longer than Costello's original rendition. An accompanying music video to Krall's version was created and released in 2004, and eventually uploaded onto her official Vevo account on October 6, 2009. The visual was selected by the singer to appear on her greatest hits album, The Very Best of Diana Krall, in 2007. In her review of the video's inclusion on the aforementioned album, Shackleton mentioned the "wintry outdoor scenes from Diana's native Vancouver Island" as a highlight.

=== Background and composition ===
Much of the song's production is similar to its original counterpart; it was written by Costello, while Krall and Tommy LiPuma handled the track's production. However, this version is in F major at a tempo of 56 beats per minute. According to the recording's official sheet music, her vocals range from E_{3} to F_{4}, with a "very slow and gentle" expression.

=== Critical reception ===
Krall's version of "Almost Blue" divided critics. On a positive note, Thom Jurek of AllMusic enjoyed its blues roots and called the cover "striking". Agreeing, BBC Music's Kathryn Shackleton appreciated Krall's "sultry and raw" vocals, which Creative Loafing's Hal Horowitz called "beautifully muted". However, Noel Murray of The A.V. Club questioned its overall composure for not "do[ing] much". Despite appreciating Costello's version in a previous review, Wolk from Slate disapproved of her edition and evident genre change, preferring her "pre-rock ballad standards" to her current material.
