= You Little Fool =

1982 song by Elvis Costello

Single by Elvis Costello and the Attractions

from the album Imperial Bedroom
- B-side: "Big Sister"; "The Stamping Ground"
- Released: June 1982
- Recorded: 1981–1982
- Studio: AIR (London, UK)
- Genre: Baroque pop; new wave
- Label: F-Beat (UK)
- Songwriter: Elvis Costello
- Producer: Geoff Emerick

Elvis Costello and the Attractions singles chronology
"I'm Your Toy" (1982)	"You Little Fool" (1982)	"Man Out of Time" (1982)

"You Little Fool" is a song written by new wave musician Elvis Costello and performed by Elvis Costello and the Attractions on their 1982 album, Imperial Bedroom. The lyrics detail a teenage girl's romantic encounter with an older man.

The song was released as the first single from Imperial Bedroom, reaching number 52 in the United Kingdom. The song has since seen positive reception from critics and has been performed live by Costello.

== Background ==
Costello has described "You Little Fool" as being "about a teenage girl surrendering to an unworthy, older man". The bridge of the song features lyrics that Costello explains represent the bad advice that the girl is being given by her mother; he explained in an interview:

This mum actually thinks she's being really liberal and is really giving her girl actually no help ... It's the mums that read too many Cosmopolitan magazines and start feeding the kids, you know, "Yeah, read this, read The Sensuous Woman". It's a load of bollocks.

Costello also recalled that, on the song, he attempted to sing in a "slimy-sounding voice" to play the man taking advantage of the girl, noting, "The guy on the chorus sounds like a real horrible person". During a 2016 concert, Costello stated the song was prompted by "romantic misery".

"You Little Fool" features baroque stylings that distinguished the song from his earlier output, most notably through Steve Nieve's harpsichord performance, which was partially dubbed backwards onto the track's closing segment. Costello said of the song's arrangement, "'You Little Fool' sounds wrong when you try to play it with fuzzy guitars. Like what Chuck Berry said, it lost the beauty of the melody". In another interview, Costello emphasized that the song "was deliberately meant to sound archaic, with a harpsichord and 12-string guitar, this phoney kind of... I wanted it to sound like "Vanity Fair" or Left Banke or someone".

== Release ==
At the insistence of Costello's record company, "You Little Fool" was released as the first single from Imperial Bedroom in June 1982. The choice of the song as a single was against Costello's wishes; he had wished to make a "bolder statement" with a song more representative of the album, such as "Beyond Belief" or "Man Out of Time". He explained, "'You Little Fool', which is one of the brightest-sounding tracks until you listen to lyrics, was released purely because it had a hook. I kept saying, 'Well, 'Man Out of Time' is what the album is about, that's the heart of the record'". The two songs on the B-side of the single were the non-album tracks "Big Sister" and "The Stamping Ground". The latter was credited to "the Emotional Toothpaste," which was a pseudonym for Costello.

"You Little Fool" was considered a commercial disappointment, reaching number 52 in the UK. The single was accompanied by a music video, where Costello and the Attractions act in roles relating to the song's lyrics.

== Reception ==
"You Little Fool" has generally seen positive reception from critics. At the time of its release, Scott Isler of Trouser Press wrote that the song's "mixture of pathos and contempt will be more reassuring to inflexible Costello fans". Dave McKenna of The Washington Post named the song as one of the tracks on Imperial Bedroom that "were blessed with hooks so memorable they took fans right back to that time they first heard them" at a 2016 concert, while Blender named it one of the songs to download off of Imperial Bedroom. Martin Chilton of The Daily Telegraph ranked the song as Costello's 33rd best.

== Live history ==
Costello has performed "You Little Fool" regularly since its release. The song was one of the tracks that Costello performed in a solo acoustic form during his 1986 tour with the Attractions. During performances in 2019, the echoed vocals that Costello overdubbed on the studio version were performed by backing vocalists Briana Lee and Kitten Kuroi.

== Charts ==
Chart (1982)	Peak position
UK Singles (OCC)	52
