= The Only Flame in Town =

Single by Elvis Costello and the Attractions

from the album Goodbye Cruel World
- B-side: "Baby It's You"
- Released: July 1984
- Recorded: March–April 1984
- Studio: Sarm West (London)
- Genre: New wave, pop
- Length: 4:01
- Label: F-Beat
- Songwriter: Elvis Costello
- Producers: Clive Langer; Alan Winstanley

Elvis Costello and the Attractions singles chronology
"I Wanna Be Loved" (1984)	"The Only Flame in Town" (1984)	"Green Shirt" (1985)

Music video
- The Only Flame in Town on YouTube

"The Only Flame in Town" is a song written by new wave musician Elvis Costello and recorded by Costello with his backing band the Attractions. The song appeared on Costello's 1984 album, Goodbye Cruel World. Originally written in the style of a classic torch song, "The Only Flame in Town" was reworked by producers Clive Langer and Alan Winstanley in a more pop-friendly style. This final version features Daryl Hall of Hall & Oates on backing vocals.

"The Only Flame in Town" was released as the second single from Goodbye Cruel World in July 1984. The single reached number 71 in Britain but found greater success in the US, reaching number 56 on the back of a popular MTV video about a fictional "Win a date with the Attractions" contest. Since its release, the song has been seen mixed critical reception, with some writers opining that the commercial sound fit the song well.

== Background ==
"The Only Flame in Town" began as a slower torch song, akin to the arrangement present on the alternate version of the song released as a bonus track on the 2004 reissue of Goodbye Cruel World. Costello noted that he originally wrote the song for soul singer Aaron Neville. After attempting this arrangement with the Attractions in the studio, Costello deemed the take to be too "laboured" and "arcane" and allowed his producers, Clive Langer and Alan Winstanley, to rework the song in a more pop/R&B-influenced style. This version featured what Costello described as a "clatter of mechanical percussion" from Pete and Bruce Thomas as well as a Bach-inspired keyboard part composed by Steve Nieve.

"The Only Flame in Town" also was among the first Attractions recordings to feature additional musicians. Gary Barnacle played saxophone on the recording, a performance of which Costello commented on in 2004, "Unfortunately, when I now hear the sax entrance on 'The Only Flame,' I can't help but think of the theme from Moonlighting. Ah well, it all seemed like a good idea at the time."

Additionally, Daryl Hall of Hall & Oates made a guest appearance on backing vocals. In a 1984 interview, Costello, who initially thought Hall was more of a "cult" artist than he was, recalled, "He's a very nice person: very professional, came in and did the session very quickly and seemed to enjoy himself." Costello then rejected the idea that he should not collaborate with mainstream pop artists, stating, "Some of the inverted snobs of the music business are perhaps going to be offended by his presence because they associate him with some vacuous form of pop. But he's got a great voice, and that's all I care about."

== Release ==
"The Only Flame in Town" was released as the opening track on Goodbye Cruel World in June 1984. One month later, the song was released as the album's second single, featuring the non-album B-side "Baby It's You", an acoustic duet performed by Costello with Nick Lowe. The single was reached number 71 in the UK, but achieved more success in the US, reaching number 56. The song's commercial success in the US was bolstered by the song's music video, which became a hit on MTV. Costello said of the video, which also featured Hall:

Shot by Rock 'n' Roll High School director Allan Arkush, "The Only Flame" clip featured a "Win a date with The Attractions contest," in which the band are actually credited with individual personalities, funny little thumbnail sketches of the real guys. Naturally, my romantic rival was Daryl, but my only real humiliation was in having a Columbia promotion woman hector the makeup girl: "Make him look handsome," while a very hungover Daryl sat in the next chair looking like a movie star. His hair was perfect.

In addition to its appearance on Goodbye Cruel World, "The Only Flame in Town" appears on the 1985 compilation album The Best of Elvis Costello and the Attractions. Costello also considered rerecording the song for his 1996 album All This Useless Beauty—the album had originally been conceived as a collection of songs Costello intended for other people, thus making "The Only Flame in Town", a song originally intended for Aaron Neville, a possible contender.

== Reception and legacy ==
"The Only Flame in Town" has received mixed reviews from critics since its release, with some praising the more commercial sound. In its 1984 review of Goodbye Cruel World, Rolling Stone's Don Shewey praised the contrast between the song's "happy, soulful sax line and keyboard groove" and "clipped, clever and accusatory" lyrics. In a 1985 review of The Best of Elvis Costello and the Attractions, however, Denny Angelle of Boys' Life described the song as the "silliest" on the album and commented, "I hope that's not his new direction."

Retrospective writers have expressed similar sentiments. In an otherwise critical review of the album, Blender named it a song to download from Goodbye Cruel World. Stephen Thomas Erlewine of AllMusic, while not naming it as one of the finest songs on the album, concluded that it was one of the few on the album that benefitted from the slicker production. In contrast, Trunkworthy praised the original, slower arrangement as a better fit for the song's style.

== Charts ==
Chart (1985)	Peak position
UK Singles (Official Charts)	71
US Billboard Hot 100	56
US Billboard Mainstream Rock Tracks	44
