= A Good Year for the Roses =

Country song

Single by George Jones

from the album George Jones with Love
- B-side: "Let a Little Loving Come In"
- Released: October 1970
- Genre: Country
- Length: 3:12
- Label: Musicor
- Songwriter: Jerry Chesnut
- Producer: Bob Moore

George Jones singles chronology
"Tell Me My Lying Eyes Are Wrong" (1970)	"A Good Year for the Roses" (1970)	"Sometimes You Just Can't Win" (1971)

"Good Year for the Roses"

Single by Elvis Costello and the Attractions

from the album Almost Blue
- B-side: "Your Angel Steps Out Of Heaven"
- Released: September 1981
- Studio: CBS Studio A (Nashville, Tennessee)
- Genre: Country; urban cowboy
- Length: 3:08
- Label: F-Beat; WEA; Columbia
- Songwriter: Jerry Chesnut
- Producer: Billy Sherrill

Elvis Costello singles chronology
"From a Whisper to a Scream" (1981)	"Good Year for the Roses" (1981)	"Sweet Dreams" (1981)

"A Good Year for the Roses"

Single by George Jones featuring Alan Jackson

from the album The Bradley Barn Sessions
- B-side: "High-Tech Redneck"
- Released: November 1994
- Genre: Country
- Length: 3:38
- Label: MCA Nashville
- Songwriter: Jerry Chesnut
- Producer: Brian Ahern

George Jones singles chronology
"Never Bit a Bullet Like This" (1994)	"A Good Year for the Roses" (1994)	"One" (1995)

Alan Jackson singles chronology
"Livin' on Love" (1994)	"A Good Year for the Roses" (1994)	"Gone Country" (1994)

"A Good Year for the Roses" is a ballad written by Jerry Chesnut and originally recorded by American country singer George Jones. It rose to #2 on the country singles chart in 1970.

== Background ==
"A Good Year for the Roses" describes the thoughts of a man as his wife leaves him, and is as good an example as any of Jones' ability to deliver an intensely moving vocal, in this case one that conveys both the sadness and profound bitterness that comes with a broken marriage. Although recorded while George was with Musicor, the production is typical of the sound Billy Sherrill would employ when Jones moved to Epic Records the following year. Although supported by a choir of background singers and strings on the chorus, Jones' vocal is the centerpiece throughout, with Chris Woodstra of AllMusic calling it "one of his all-time greatest performances." The lyric, infused by Jones' nuanced delivery, captures the disillusion of the narrator.

Jones recorded two versions of the song; the second can be heard on the A Good Year for the Roses: The Complete Musicor Recordings 1965-1971. Jones also cut the song with Alan Jackson as a duet in 1994 for the Bradley Barn Sessions, but was disappointed with its reception by country radio, noting in his autobiography, "Alan was white-hot on the radio, and programmers wanted his voice. But some didn't want his if they had to take mine. The vast majority of Alan's other single records have gone to number one. His duet with me was his first not to crack the top 50." It actually peaked at number 57. In June 1995, the song won the Music City News Country Awards "Vocal Collaboration of the Year."

== Other notable recordings ==
Elvis Costello scored a No. 6 hit in the UK Singles Chart with the song in 1981.

== Video ==
The video for the Elvis Costello version of the song was shot at The Meldrum House Hotel, Oldmeldrum, Aberdeenshire on Wednesday, July 29, 1981. The band were in the north east of Scotland to appear at the Aberdeen Country and Western Club on July 30, with the performance to be filmed by London Weekend Television.

== Chart performance ==
=== George Jones version ===
Chart (1970–1971)	Peak position
Canada Country Singles (RPM)	4
US Bubbling Under Hot 100 Singles (Billboard)	12
US Hot Country Singles (Billboard)	2

=== Elvis Costello version ===
Chart (1981–1982)	Peak position
Australia (Kent Music Report)	34
Belgium (Flanders)	25
Ireland (Irish Singles Chart)	5
The Netherlands (Dutch Top 40)	11
UK Singles Chart	6

=== George Jones and Alan Jackson version ===
Chart (1994)	Peak position
Canada Country Singles (RPM)	65
US Hot Country Songs (Billboard)	56

== Bibliography ==
- Jones, George; Carter, Tom (1997). I Lived to Tell It All. Random House Publishing Group. p. 417. ISBN 978-0-440-22373-3.
