= Almost Blue =

Studio album by Elvis Costello and the Attractions
- Released: 23 October 1981
- Recorded: 18–29 May 1981
- Studios: CBS Studio A (Nashville, Tennessee)
- Genre: Country
- Length: 32:35
- Labels: F-Beat; Columbia
- Producer: Billy Sherrill

Elvis Costello and the Attractions chronology
Trust (1981)	Almost Blue (1981)	Imperial Bedroom (1982)

Singles from Almost Blue
- 1. "Good Year for the Roses" Released: September 1981; 2. "Sweet Dreams" Released: December 1981

Almost Blue is the sixth studio album by the English singer-songwriter Elvis Costello, and his fifth with the Attractions—keyboardist Steve Nieve, bassist Bruce Thomas and drummer Pete Thomas (no relation). It was recorded in May 1981 in Nashville, Tennessee, and released in October the same year. A departure from Costello's previous works, it is a covers album composed entirely of country music songs, including works written by Hank Williams and George Jones. The project originated with Costello's desire to record a collection of covers after his two previous studio albums commercially underperformed following Armed Forces (1979).

Produced by Billy Sherrill, the recording sessions were marked by a fraught atmosphere, including resistance from Sherrill himself. The Doobie Brothers member John McFee contributed pedal steel as a way to add an authentic country sound. Most of the songs are relatively straightforward renditions of their original counterparts; a few were based on other covers of the originals. Costello's poor health during recording and troubled personal life reflected in the song choices. All of the tracks express a "blue" state of mind, reflected in the cover artwork, an homage to jazz guitarist Kenny Burrell's Midnight Blue (1963).

The lead single, a cover of Jones's "Good Year for the Roses", received heavy airplay and reached the UK top ten. Almost Blue was released to little promotion, reaching number 7 in the UK and number 50 in the US. It received mixed reviews from music critics, who were divided on the vocal performances and debated on Costello's success as a country singer. It has continued to receive mixed reactions in later decades from critics and has placed low on lists ranking the artist's albums. Nevertheless, Rolling Stone argued in 2016 that the album predicted numerous unexpected musical excursions Costello took later in his career. It has been reissued multiple times with bonus tracks.

== Background ==
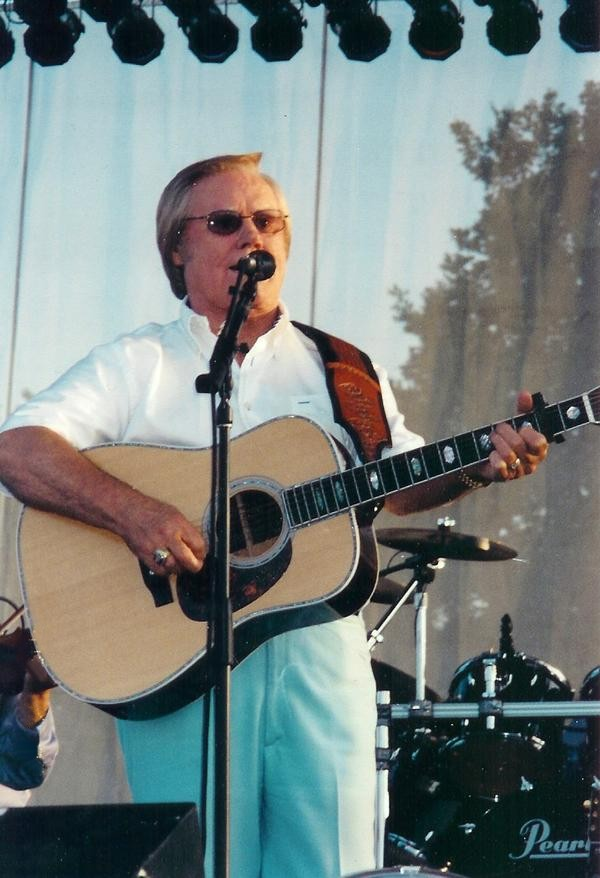
Before Almost Blue, Costello recorded "Stranger in the House" with country singer George Jones (pictured in 2012).

By 1981, Elvis Costello had experimented with country music throughout his entire career. While he did not grow up listening to country music, his discovery of Gram Parsons' work with both the Byrds and the Flying Burrito Brothers (Note: Costello specifically cited the Byrds' Sweetheart of the Rodeo (1968) and the Flying Burrito Brothers' The Gilded Palace of Sin (1969)) inspired him to explore other country acts such as Merle Haggard and the Louvin Brothers. (Note: Parsons's solo albums GP (1973) and Grievous Angel (1974), in particular, provided the biggest inspiration for Almost Blue.) He played country rock songs during his time with the pub rock band Flip City in the mid-1970s and recorded the country tracks "Radio Sweetheart" and "Stranger in the House" during the sessions for his debut album My Aim Is True (1977). (Note: He had originally intended to include "Stranger in the House" on My Aim Is True but it was removed by his record label for being "too country".) At the suggestion of Columbia Records' executive Greg Geller—who signed Costello to Columbia in America in 1977—Costello sang "Stranger in the House" as a duet with country musician George Jones in 1979, which appeared on the latter's My Very Special Guests album the same year. Costello first met Jones's longtime producer, Billy Sherrill, during an initial session in Nashville, Tennessee a year earlier. When Jones failed to show up, the two became friends and agreed to work together if Costello desired to create a country album.

The weaker commercial performances of both Get Happy!! (1980) and Trust (1981) following the successful Armed Forces (1979) made Costello question where he was at in his career. He was unable to express his current thoughts in his own music and stated that he "just wanted to sing other people's songs". Intending to explore his capabilities as a performer of cover versions, he recorded acoustic demos of several popular songs, including "Gloomy Sunday" (1933) and Cole Porter's "Love for Sale" (1930). His initial vision was not limited to country music but rather "a collection of melancholy songs of many styles", similar to Frank Sinatra's Only the Lonely (1958). In an interview with Nicky Campbell, the artist said:

As much as I wanted to escape the limitations of just being a pop singer, known for only one song, it seemed there wasn't an obvious audience for what we did. Get Happy!! sold half of what Armed Forces did, and Trust didn't do as well as that. Maybe I could just get away from my own self for a while, and throw the light on the emotional side of what I do.

== Development ==
While touring Trust in early 1981, Costello and his backing band the Attractions—keyboardist Steve Nieve, bassist Bruce Thomas and drummer Pete Thomas (no relation)—conducted a session at Nashville's CBS Studio B with Sherrill producing and Pete Drake on pedal steel that foreshadowed Almost Blue; the session yielded covers of Hank Cochran's "He's Got You" (1962) and Bobby Bland's "I'll Take Care of You" (1959). The band also road-tested several country songs during the tour. The Attractions had hesitations about the project, but Costello did not want to work with session musicians, stating: "Then it would be just like going to the funfair and sticking your head through one of those little cut-out things and having your picture taken. I thought it could be a good emotional record. It was something that was very real to me when I did it."

Rehearsals for the project commenced at Nick Lowe's Am-Pro Studios in early April 1981. (Note: Lowe served as producer of Costello's previous five albums.) Pete Thomas's associate from his former band Chilly Willy and the Red Hot Peppers, Paul "Bassman" Riley, contributed bass after Bruce Thomas fell ill; Bruce recovered in time for the album sessions. Over 40 songs were rehearsed. Songs Costello chose for the project included tracks recorded by Jones, Stonewall Jackson, Janis Martin, Webb Pierce, Conway Twitty and Charlie Rich. Sherrill felt the chosen material was outdated and presented cassette tapes of songs he felt were better suited, such as Elvis Presley's "Heartbreak Hotel" (1956) and a Willie Nelson demo titled "I Just Can't Let You Say Goodbye". Sherrill was willing to see how the band would interpret the material "unless we write a new one". The producer also convinced Costello to record one of his own songs, "Too Far Gone".

== Production ==
=== Recording ===
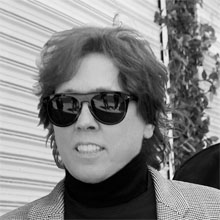
Guitarist John McFee (pictured in 2010) contributed pedal steel to Almost Blue as a way to add an authentic country sound.

The album was recorded from 18 to 29 May 1981 at Nashville's CBS Studio A; Studio B was being renovated so operations were forced to move to the adjacent studio, which Costello said was more generic and less atmospheric. Sherrill produced while Ron "Snake" Reynolds engineered; it was Costello's first studio album not produced by Nick Lowe. Alongside the Attractions, Doobie Brothers member John McFee was invited to contribute pedal steel and additional guitar overdubs to add an authentic country sound. Costello said: "We wanted the sound but we didn't necessarily want the main instrumental line which usually comes from the steel in country to be somebody we'd never heard before." The sessions were filmed by a camera crew, directed by Peter Carr, for the arts programme The South Bank Show.

The sessions were marred by a tense atmosphere. Costello himself was in poor health: he looked pale, was overweight and constantly drinking, which led to the recording of Haggard's "Tonight the Bottle Let Me Down" (1966) and Rich's "Sittin' and Thinkin'". According to Costello, Sherrill was a poor producer. Compared to Lowe, Sherrill was distant, uncommunicative and more interested in personal ventures than producing. With different work ethics, the producer and artist clashed frequently, with the latter stating that "after a while it was less of a collaboration and more of a contest in cultural differences". Costello recalled at one point finding Sherrill and Reynolds comparing handguns behind the mixing desk.

Sherrill had little faith in the project itself; he and CBS saw the sessions as an "Englishman's indulgence ... in music he didn't really understand". He later recalled he lacked interest in Costello as an artist and failed to understand what he could contribute. McFee remembered an instance where Sherrill pulled him aside and asked him "What the hell does this guy think he wants to make a country record for?" The Attractions also disliked Sherrill. Nieve and Pete Thomas enjoyed country music and the project as a whole, while Bruce did not. One day the band ran through a fast rendition of Hank Williams's "Why Don't You Love Me (Like You Used to Do)?", which Sherrill enjoyed. He later said that the way they played the track is what he thought the whole album itself would sound like.

Despite the fraught atmosphere, Costello stated the sessions progressed quickly and productively, limiting the tracks to one or two takes before moving on to the next. According to Costello, over 25 songs were recorded during the sessions, although a good portion attempted were never in serious contention for inclusion on the album, recorded simply as backing tracks and lacking final mixes. (Note: Costello mixed the tracks with Riley at an unnamed England studio at a later date.) The band attempted Costello's original "Tears Before Bedtime", a non-country number which Sherrill rejected. (Note: "Tears Before Bedtime" would be recorded and released on Imperial Bedroom (1982).) In the final days, Sherrill identified the recordings of Jones's "Good Year for the Roses" (1970) and Don Gibson's "Sweet Dreams" (1955) as potential hits, adding strings by Tommy Millar and backing vocals by Nashville Edition. After mixing, Costello and the Attractions had dinner with Johnny Cash and his family to celebrate the occasion. (Note: In his memoir, Costello states that he believed Johnny and June wanted to "extend their hospitality" to the friends of Lowe, his son-in-law.)

=== Composition ===
I went there in a very depressed frame of mind anyway. I had this sad feeling, I dunno why, it wasn't anything specific in my life, I'd just wound myself up to it. [...] Looking back now, I can't imagine how I was so miserable sounding. It was a genuine feeling, so I never accepted the criticisms that the singing wasn't authentic.

— Elvis Costello, NME, 1982

A departure from Costello's previous works, Almost Blue is composed of 12 country songs that all reflect a "blue" state of mind. In his review for Melody Maker, Allan Jones stated that the tracks are divided between "driving, shitkicking honky tonk tunes and exquisitely poignant ballads". Costello's troubled personal life, including his failing marriage and alcoholism, were reflected in the song choices, particularly "Tonight the Bottle Let Me Down", "Sittin' and Thinkin'" and George Jones's "Brown to Blue". Rolling Stone's Will Hodge argued that other than the fast-paced version of "Why Don't You Love Me (Like You Used to Do)?" that opens the album, the album itself bears little resemblance to the artist's previous works. The author Mick St. Michael added that the opening track does not represent the album as a whole, a statement supported by Costello, who said "the meat of the album is the ballads".

The majority of the songs are mostly straightforward renditions of their original counterparts; "Sweet Dreams" and Big Joe Turner's "Honey Hush" (1953) were based on the Tommy McLain and Johnny Burnette Trio renditions, respectively. (Note: Costello later commented that he went to Nashville to specifically record "Honey Hush".) Costello said Nieve devised new piano lines for "Brown to Blue" and "How Much I've Lied". Three tracks by George Jones appear: "Brown to Blue", "Good Year for the Roses" and "Color of the Blues" (1958). The band recorded the Johnny Mullins-penned Loretta Lynn number "Success" (1962) at the insistence of Nieve, who recalled: "We must have gone through hundreds of albums, trying to find that one song that we could make our own." Other tracks include Sherrill's "Too Far Gone" and Parsons's "How Much I've Lied" and "Hot Burrito No. 1", the latter retitled "I'm Your Toy". Costello commented that "Hot Burrito No. 1" was one of his favourites and "an ambition" of his to cover it. St. Michael states that Costello utilised looser and less formal vocal performances on the Parsons tracks, which aid in their successes.

== Packaging and artwork ==
The album's design is an homage to Kenny Burrell's Midnight Blue (1963) and was packaged in four different coloured sleeves, all with blue as the base. Photographed by Keith Morris, the image depicts Costello with his glasses removed and face covered with one hand – a ring on his middle finger – appearing as though he is hiding tears. The original LP came with a removable sticker reading "Warning: This album contains country & western music and may produce radical reaction in narrow minded people". (Note: An alternate sticker read: "Warning: This album contains country & western music and may cause offence to raw minded listeners.") In his memoir, Costello stated the "warning" was a tease for listeners who desired "More New Wave Hits". On the back cover, Costello and the Attractions appear with small grins, along with an image of McFee in a Stetson. A logo reads "no spoiler signal".

== Release ==
Nashville didn't do a single thing to promote it. I've heard vague reports that it got played on a couple of obscure country stations, but I guess they thought it was too weird, that an English group at all would do that, let alone an English "new waver." Country and western stations, they probably think I'm a punk still ...

— Elvis Costello, NME, 1982

"Good Year for the Roses" was issued as the lead single, backed by a cover of Jack Ripley's "Your Angel Steps Out of Heaven", in September 1981. It received heavy airplay on BBC Radio One and Radio Two and charted at number 6 on the UK Singles Chart, proving Costello's prediction that it "would probably reach a lot of people that don't buy our records normally". It was promoted with a music video that was filmed at the Meldrum House. According to Costello, they could not take a piano onto the wood floor of the saloon so Nieve mimed the string parts using a violin. The video was played frequently on MTV in America during the programme's early days. "Sweet Dreams" was released as the second single in December, backed by a live version of Leon Payne's "Psycho", and reached number 42 in the UK.

Almost Blue was released on 23 October 1981 through F-Beat Records in the UK and Columbia in the US. It reached number 7 on the UK Albums Chart and number 50 on the US Billboard Top LPs & Tape chart, the latter of which Costello attributed to the lack of promotion from country radio stations. F-Beat released an interview album subtitled Elvis Introduces His Favorite Country Songs to selected journalists and DJs as a promotional tool. The South Bank Show special filmed during the recording sessions aired shortly after its release. The band took time off after recording, with occasional live performances in late-July that mostly featured Costello's previous work and less country material. By August, he had begun writing original compositions and demoed several songs that would appear on his next album, Imperial Bedroom (1982).

== Critical reception ==
Professional ratings
Initial reviews
Review scores
Source	Rating
Record Mirror	5/5 stars
Rolling Stone	3/5 stars
Times Colonist	3/5 stars
The Village Voice	B−

Almost Blue received mixed reviews from music critics on release. In the UK, it was greeted with mostly positive reactions. In Melody Maker, Allan Jones positively compared the artist's vocal performances to Trust, arguing that Costello's voice "has rarely enjoyed such freedom and expressive scope", concluding that Almost Blue "unashamedly evoke[s] memories of all the places you thought you'd never leave but did, all the lovers you thought you'd still know, don't, but can't forget." Paul Du Noyer deemed it "a richly satisfying sidestep" in NME, saying that "it has the feel of being both a homage and a holiday". In a five-star review, Record Mirror's Mike Nicholls proclaimed that taken on its own terms, "it's as flawless an LP as has been released all year", although he felt Costello's fans would be disappointed due to the lack of originals.

Costello's vocal performances proved divisive in America. Many deemed some renditions as successes and others as failures. (Note: Attributed to multiple references:) In Rolling Stone, Martha Hume argued that "a truly great country singer" possesses both control of their own voice, the ability to broadcast a character and—ideally—is able to convey their own personality onto the listener. She stated that Costello succeeds at this on "Sweet Dreams", "I'm Your Toy" and "Good Year for the Roses", while failing on "Brown to Blue", "Tonight the Bottle Let Me Down" and "Color of the Blues". Hume noted that the LP stood as the artist's first album on which the lyrics are easily understandable. Writing for The New York Times, Robert Palmer wrote that Costello's singing "exposes his own technical limitations", a comment supported by Robert Hilburn in the Los Angeles Times, who wrote that Costello's voice is ideal for "expressing ironies and nuances" in his own songs, but "lacks the purity and range" to effectively compete with the original versions of the tracks. More positively, Cash Box argued that the singer's "distinctive vocals fit perfectly into the country framework" and the songs are "rendered with conviction and emotion".

Almost Blue is, like its title, disturbing and depressing; it breathes in and out the feeling (and not-feeling) of attending the funeral of a casual acquaintance. Worse, [because] Costello has invaded the trusting soul of country music and made a mean-spirited mess of it, I don't expect him to have shame about this; I just want him to go home.

— Boo Browning, The Washington Post, 1981

American critics were mixed on Almost Blue as a whole. Carrie B. Cooper found that Costello was "settling for love rather than passion" in Boston Rock. Billboard announced that the album "does for country what the band's Get Happy!! did for R&B—respect the music's form and essence, yet link both to Costello's own writing". More negatively, Hilburn deemed it a "major disappointment" that would serve as an intriguing piece for hardcore fans, but provide little enjoyment to everyone else, exhibiting "little of Costello's usual vision". Hilburn asserted that although Almost Blue is not a bad country album, it "simply lacks the power and originality we have come to expect from this invaluable figure". In Trouser Press, Jon Young felt that the artist would be a worthy participant in country as a whole once he presented more of himself into the genre. Young and Ira Robbins later labelled the album "surprisingly clumsy" and a "dud".

Additionally, several noted the continued absence of Costello's angry persona featured prominently in his earlier works, while some gave positive mentions to the performances of the Attractions. In The Village Voice, critic Robert Christgau positively compared Almost Blue to other covers albums such as David Bowie's Pin Ups (1973) and John Lennon's Rock 'n' Roll (1975), records that "also seemed 'important' when they appeared".

== Subsequent events and legacy ==
I was completely obsessed with country music at the time, although I hardly play country records now. I've exhausted that love, though I still have my personal favourites. [...] I listen to [Almost Blue] now and think 'God! I was never this depressed, was I?' It is a very depressing sounding record.

— Elvis Costello, The Face, 1983

After recording Imperial Bedroom in November 1981, Costello and the Attractions underwent the Almost Blue Tour from December to January 1982, playing major cities in the US and the UK. The setlist was composed of country songs from Almost Blue, as well as older and newer originals. On 7 January, Costello played to a sold out show at the Royal Albert Hall, fronting the 92-member Royal Philharmonic Orchestra. The show received praise from Allan Jones, who hailed that "Costello's voice raided every emotional avenue on its way to the heart." A live version of "I'm Your Toy" from the show was released as a single in April, backed by renditions of Johnny Cash's "Cry! Cry! Cry!" (1955) and Webb Pierce's "Wondering" (1951). Costello and the Attractions continued touring throughout 1982 before Imperial Bedroom was released in July.

Although Get Happy!! had represented Costello's first instance of shifting musical styles, Almost Blue stood as his first true departure, predicting a career of ever-changing songwriting approaches, musical styles and experimentation. Hodge commented in 2016 that since Almost Blue, Costello has released several "unconventional and unexpected" albums amidst his "normal" albums, from the orchestral instrumental of G.B.H. (1991) and the jazz ballads of North (2003), to a ballet score (Il Sogno, 2004) and a collection of classical string quartet pieces (The Juliet Letters, 1993). Hodge further acknowledges the artist's collaborative records with the Roots (Wise Up Ghost, 2013), Burt Bacharach (Painted from Memory, 1998) and Allen Toussaint (The River in Reverse, 2006). Costello returned to country music in the late-2000s with the back-to-back releases of Secret, Profane & Sugarcane (2009) and National Ransom (2010). Hodge summarises:

While these experiments may feel like sudden left turns in the moment, they always manage to get you right back where you started ... It's a feat that can be easily traced back to the first yank of the steering wheel found on Almost Blue.

=== Retrospective appraisal ===
Professional ratings
Retrospective reviews
Review scores
Source	Rating
AllMusic	4/5 stars
Blender	4/5 stars
Chicago Tribune	2/4 stars
Encyclopedia of Popular Music	3/5 stars
Entertainment Weekly	B
Mojo	4/5 stars
Q	3/5 stars
The Rolling Stone Album Guide	2/5 stars
Spin	3/5 stars
Uncut	4/5 stars

Retrospectively, Almost Blue has received mixed-to-positive reviews from critics. In 1994, Q magazine's David Cavanagh acknowledged that "its exact point eluded most of us, although it arguably turned many others on to the genre from which it drew", further remarking that its first expanded reissue presented it as "a little too good to class as a career blip". Senior AllMusic editor Stephen Thomas Erlewine agreed, arguing that Almost Blue stands as "one of the most entertaining cover records in rock & roll" due to the enthusiasm behind the project. Reporting on the 2004 reissue, Uncut magazine's Chris Roberts argued that the album has aged well despite its divisive reception on its initial release, highlighting "Sweet Dreams", "Good Year for the Roses" and "I'm Your Toy" as tracks that sound "as warm and nasty as ever". The online music service Rhapsody called it one of their favourite covers albums in 2010. In 2022, Chris Ingalls of PopMatters named Almost Blue one of Costello's ten most under-appreciated albums, finding the artist's embracement of the genre and the Attractions' fine performances make for a "worthwhile listen" and a "charming change of pace".

Costello's biographers have shown appreciation for Almost Blue. In his book Elvis Costello: God's Comic, David Gouldstone describes the album as "a brave experiment, and a successful one". Tony Clayton-Lea deems it "one of rock's finest and enriching sidesteps", summarising it as "another collection of good, even great songs". St. Michael commends the performances and overall good execution, further stating that Costello had already displayed "his command of the country lyric idiom" on tracks such as "Stranger in the House" and Trust's "Different Finger". The author James E. Perone calls the record uneven but finds it "presents Elvis Costello as a successful country balladeer who could effectively sing American country ballads and not simply try to capture the style." Graeme Thomson, on the other hand, describes Almost Blue as "a difficult record to love". He opines that despite its brevity—at a little over 30 minutes in length—it drags and "merely sound[s] funereal and oppressive", with the more up-tempo tracks "lumbering rather than fleet of foot".

In lists ranking Costello's albums from worst to best, Almost Blue has consistently ranked in the lower tier. In 2021, writers for Stereogum placed it at number 18 (out of 27), deeming the material "serviceable" with "surprisingly perfunctory" results. They highlighted the album as a showcase for Costello's growth as a singer, particularly on "Good Year for the Roses", ultimately dubbing Almost Blue "a tentative dry run" for the artist's reach into more experimental territories. A year later, Al Shipley of Spin magazine, placed it at number 17 (out of 31), calling it "a fascinating early fusion of Costello's personal vision and his aspirations to master a wide variety of genres." Conversely, Michael Gallucci placed it at number 27 (out of 29) in Ultimate Classic Rock the same year – only above Costello's second all-covers album Kojak Variety (1995) and Goodbye Cruel World (1984) – deeming it the first misstep of the artist's career, failed by Costello's handling of the material.

== Reissues ==
Almost Blue was first released on CD through Columbia and Demon Records in January 1986. Its first extended reissue through Demon in the UK and Rykodisc in the US on CD came in May 1994, which came with numerous bonus tracks, including outtakes and live recordings. The author Brian Hinton finds this reissue "more satisfying" than the original album, particularly highlighting the live performances in Aberdeen as "possessing a snap and crackle" lacking on the studio recordings. He also lists the Royal Albert Hall performance of "I'm Your Toy" as "pull[ing] dimensions out of Costello's voice barely hinted at in the studio version: urgency, passion and danger." Almost Blue was again reissued by Rhino Records on 3 August 2004 as a two-disc set with additional bonus tracks. The album was later remastered and reissued by UM^{e} on 6 November 2015.

== Track listing ==
Side one
No.	Title	Writer(s)	Length
1.	"Why Don't You Love Me (Like You Used to Do)?"	Hank Williams	1:40
2.	"Sweet Dreams"	Don Gibson	3:00
3.	"Success"	Johnny Mullins	2:41
4.	"I'm Your Toy" (originally recorded by the Flying Burrito Brothers as "Hot Burrito No. 1")	Gram Parsons, Chris Ethridge	3:23
5.	"Tonight The Bottle Let Me Down"	Merle Haggard	2:09
6.	"Brown to Blue"	George Jones, Virginia Franks, "Country" Johnny Mathis	2:40

Side two
No.	Title	Writer(s)	Length
7.	"Good Year for the Roses"	Jerry Chesnut	3:10
8.	"Sittin' and Thinkin'"	Charlie Rich	3:02
9.	"Color of the Blues"	Lawton Williams, George Jones	2:21
10.	"Too Far Gone"	Billy Sherrill	3:28
11.	"Honey Hush"	Lou Willie Turner	2:15
12.	"How Much I've Lied"	Parsons, Pam Rifkin	2:55
Total length:			32:35

1994 Rykodisc reissue, Extended Play: Live in Aberdeen
No.	Title	Writer(s)	Length
13.	"He's Got You"	Hank Cochran	4:17
14.	"Cry! Cry! Cry!"	Johnny Cash	2:45
15.	"There Won't Be Anymore"	Charlie Rich	2:33
16.	"Sittin' and Thinkin'"	Charlie Rich	2:55
17.	"Honey Hush"	Lou Willie Turner	2:22
18.	"Psycho"	Leon Payne	3:43
19.	"Your Angel Steps Out of Heaven"	Jack Ripley	2:00
20.	"Darling, You Know I Wouldn't Lie"	Red Lane, Wayne Kemp	3:32
21.	"My Shoes Keep Walking Back to You"	Bob Wills, Lee Ross	2:04
22.	"Tears Before Bedtime"	Elvis Costello	2:24
23.	"I'm Your Toy" (Live with the Royal Philharmonic Orchestra At The Royal Albert Hall)	Chris Ethridge, Gram Parsons	3:49
Total length:			64:59

== Personnel ==
According to the LP liner notes:

- Elvis Costello – vocals, guitar
- Steve Nieve – piano, organ
- Bruce Thomas – bass
- Pete Thomas – drums

Additional personnel

- John McFee – lead guitar, pedal steel guitar
- Tommy Millar – violin
- Nashville Edition – backing vocals

Technical

- Billy Sherrill – producer
- Ron "Snake" Reynolds – engineer
- "Fast" Eddie Hudson – assistant engineer
- Keith Morris – photography

== Charts ==
=== Weekly charts ===
Weekly chart performance for Almost Blue
Chart (1981–82)	Peak Position
Australian Albums (Kent Music Report)	50
Dutch Albums (MegaCharts)	21
Swedish Albums (Sverigetopplistan)	17
UK Albums Chart	7
US Billboard Top LPs & Tape	50

=== Certifications ===
Sales certifications for Almost Blue
Region	Certification	Certified units/sales
United Kingdom (BPI)	Gold	100,000^{^}
^{^} Shipments figures based on certification alone.
