= Geoff Emerick =

English recording engineer (1945–2018)

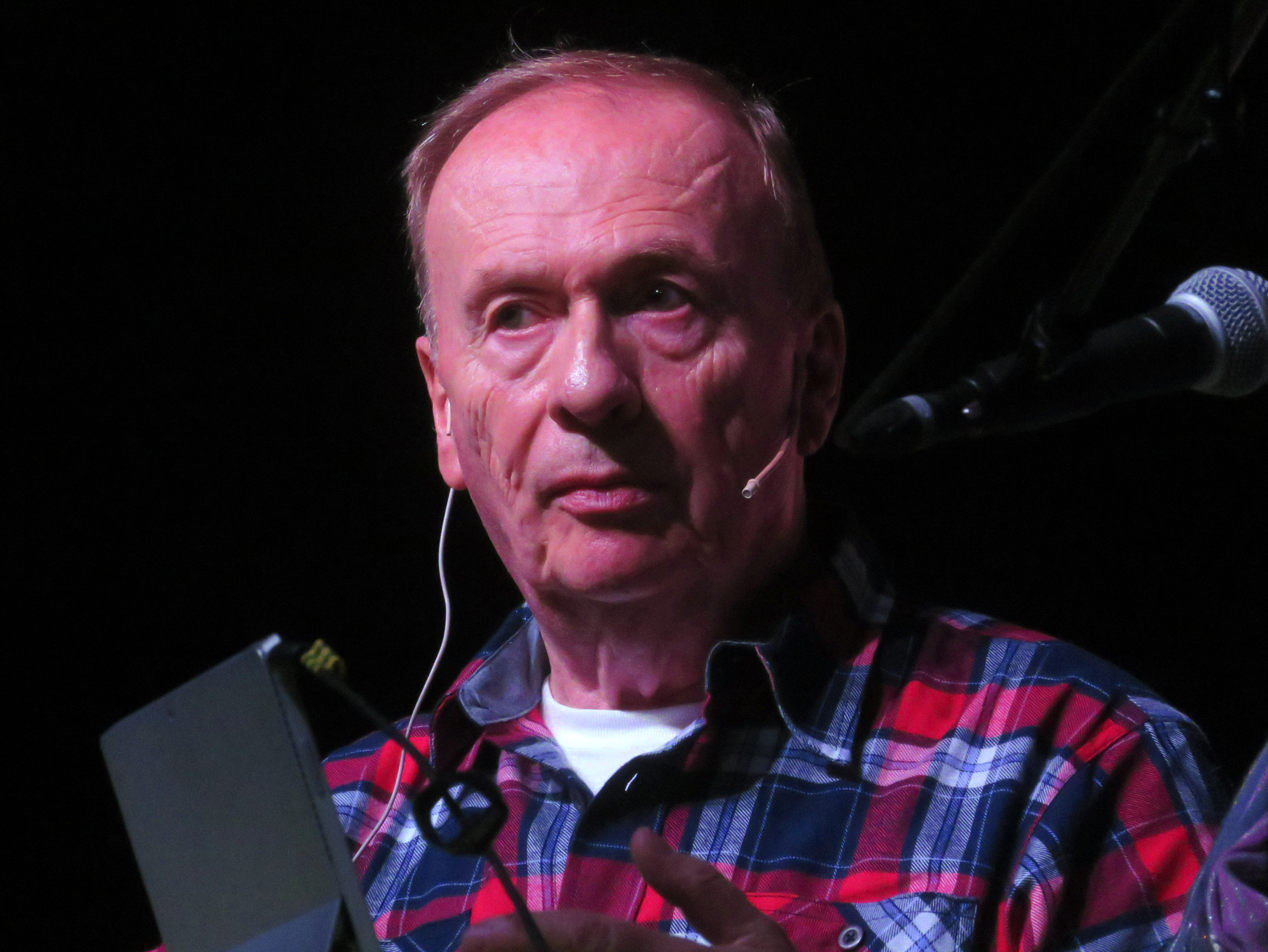
- Emerick in 2015

Background information
- Born: Geoffrey Ernest Emerick; 5 December 1945; Crouch End, North London, England
- Died: 2 October 2018 (aged 72) Los Angeles, California, US
- Occupations: Audio engineer; record producer
- Years active: 1960–2018

Geoffrey Ernest Emerick (5 December 1945 – 2 October 2018) was an English sound engineer and record producer who worked with the Beatles on their albums Revolver (1966), Sgt. Pepper's Lonely Hearts Club Band (1967) and Abbey Road (1969). The Beatles producer George Martin credited him with bringing "a new kind of mind to the recordings, always suggesting sonic ideas, different kinds of reverb, what we could do with the voices".

Emerick also engineered the Zombies' Odessey and Oracle (1968), Paul McCartney and Wings' Band on the Run (1973) and produced Elvis Costello's Imperial Bedroom (1982), among many others. He won four Grammy Awards for his work in the music recording field. His 2006 memoir Here, There and Everywhere: My Life Recording the Music of the Beatles caused controversy for its factual errors. In 2018, Emerick died from a heart attack at the age of 72 in Los Angeles, California.

== Early career at EMI ==
Geoff Emerick was brought up in Crouch End in north London and educated at Crouch End secondary modern school. One of his teachers there heard about a job at EMI and suggested he apply. At age 16, he was employed as an assistant engineer. On the 4th of September 1962, his second day at work, the Beatles came to EMI Studios (now Abbey Road Studios) to carry out their second recording session for the company. To familiarise Emerick with his work, he was placed under the supervision of another assistant engineer, Richard Langham, assistant to recording engineer Norman Smith, who would be working on the session. As a new recruit, Emerick was not entitled to receive overtime pay, but he was fortunate enough to witness the Beatles recording for the first time with their new drummer, Ringo Starr, on what became the band's debut hit single, "Love Me Do".

== Working with the Beatles and others ==
Emerick worked as an assistant engineer to Smith on several of the Beatles' early recordings, including "She Loves You" and "I Want to Hold Your Hand". From early in 1964, his involvement with the band was limited due to his training program at EMI, as he progressed to lacquer cutter, mastering engineer and then balance (or recording) engineer. During that time, he helped record other artists for the label, including Judy Garland, and assisted at the EMI artist test of the Hollies. After working his way up to the recording engineer's position, Emerick engineered the 1966 Manfred Mann single "Pretty Flamingo", which became a number 1 hit in the UK.

In April 1966, at the age of 20, Emerick took over as the Beatles' recording engineer, at the request of producer George Martin, when Smith became a producer. Emerick's first album in this new role was Revolver, starting with the sessions for the song "Tomorrow Never Knows". To try to create the ethereal vocal sound Lennon wanted, Emerick suggested recording John Lennon's vocal playing through a rotating Leslie speaker, normally used to amplify a Hammond organ. He also chose to close-mic Starr's drums, formerly a prohibited practice at EMI Studios. In 1967, Emerick engineered "Being for the Benefit of Mr. Kite!", one of the most musically complex songs on Sgt. Pepper's Lonely Hearts Club Band. Lennon told Martin he wanted to re-create the "carnival atmosphere" of the Pablo Fanque circus poster that inspired the song. For the middle eight bars, Emerick spliced together multiple recordings of fairground organs and calliope in an attempt to create the effect; after a great deal of unsuccessful experimentation, Martin instructed Emerick to chop the tape into pieces with scissors, throw them up in the air, and re-assemble them at random. Later in 1967, he engineered the Zombies' Odessey and Oracle and Tomorrow's self-titled debut album.

Emerick abandoned work on The Beatles (also known as the "White Album") on 16 July 1968, and quit his position after McCartney, working for a frustrating three days trying to record "Ob-La-Di, Ob-La-Da", unleashed an angry swear word filled tirade. Emerick also objected to Chris Thomas, Martin's inexperienced assistant, being elevated to the role of producer in Martin's absence, with the band's acceptance. He returned to work with the Beatles on Abbey Road. Emerick received Grammy Awards for the engineering of Sgt. Pepper's Lonely Hearts Club Band and Abbey Road.

Despite his departure from the White Album sessions, Emerick remained on good terms with the Beatles, particularly Paul McCartney, who invited Emerick to quit EMI and come and work for their company Apple Corps in 1969. In addition to engineering duties, Emerick oversaw the building of the band's Apple Studio in the Apple Corps building.

== After the Beatles ==
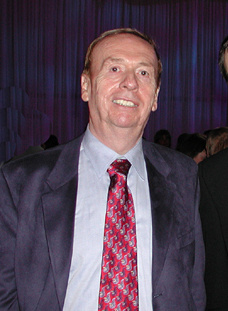
Emerick in 2003

Following the Beatles' break-up in 1970, Emerick continued to work with McCartney. He served as recording engineer on McCartney albums such as Band on the Run (1973), which netted Emerick another Grammy, London Town (1978), Tug of War (1982) and Flaming Pie (1997). Emerick later said that he had always been perceived by the other ex-Beatles as "Paul's guy". As a result, for their solo recordings, Lennon and George Harrison chose to work instead with Phil McDonald, another former EMI engineer.

Emerick was the sound engineer on Robin Trower's 1974 album Bridge of Sighs and was credited by both Trower and producer Matthew Fisher for that album's sound. He also recorded some of the backing tracks for the debut album by Stealers Wheel, but resigned early on in the process, handing over to Apple recording engineer John Mills to continue working with producers Jerry Leiber and Mike Stoller. The Stealers Wheel album featured "Stuck in the Middle with You" and went on to receive the Dutch Edison Award.

Following the success of EMI's The Beatles at Abbey Road presentation in 1983, Emerick prepared an album of the Beatles' studio outtakes, to be titled Sessions, for release. The former Beatles initiated legal proceedings to prevent EMI from issuing the album, saying that the work was substandard; when made available on bootleg compilations, his mixes and editing of some of the tracks were widely criticised by collectors. In the mid-1990s, these recordings were used for the Beatles Anthology CD releases.

Emerick also worked on albums by Elvis Costello (for whom he produced Imperial Bedroom and All This Useless Beauty), Badfinger, Art Garfunkel, America, Jeff Beck, Gino Vannelli, Supertramp, UFO, Cheap Trick, Nazareth, Chris Bell, Split Enz, Trevor Rabin, Nick Heyward, Big Country, Gentle Giant, Mahavishnu Orchestra and Ultravox. His other recording projects included Matthew Fisher's first solo album, Journey's End; Kate Bush's demo tape to EMI, which landed her a record deal; and Nellie McKay's critically acclaimed 2004 debut CD Get Away from Me. In 2003, he received his fourth Grammy, a Special Merit/Technical Grammy Award.

In 2007, Emerick produced a re-recording of Sgt. Pepper's Lonely Hearts Club Band in honour of the album's 40th anniversary. It included performances by contemporary artists such as Oasis, the Killers, Travis and Razorlight. Emerick used much of the original equipment to record the new versions of the songs, and the results were broadcast on BBC Radio 2 on 2 June that year.

From 1984, Emerick resided in Los Angeles.

== Here, There and Everywhere ==
In 2006, Emerick released his memoir, Here, There and Everywhere: My Life Recording the Music of the Beatles, co-authored by music journalist Howard Massey. The book caused controversy for its factual errors, its allegedly unfavourable portrayal of Harrison, bias towards McCartney, and belittling and dismissal of Harrison and Starr's contributions. According to Beatles biographer Robert Rodriguez, Emerick's recurring theme that Harrison lacked prowess as a guitar player until the late 1960s is more reflective of Emerick's personality, and is countered by several other sources, and some of his descriptions of the Beatles' recordings are negated by the availability of bootleg compilations of the band's multitrack masters.

Historian Erin Torkelson Weber said that, apart from Lennon's account in Lennon Remembers, the book also presents arguably the most negative depiction of Martin as a record producer. The publication led to an Internet flame war, as former Beatles engineer Ken Scott challenged the accuracy of Emerick's recollections and stated that, before writing the book, Emerick had contacted him and other EMI technical staff saying he had limited memory of the events. Scott's 2012 autobiography, From Abbey Road to Ziggy Stardust, sought to correct Emerick's statements in Here, There and Everywhere, especially with regard to Harrison's musicianship and character.

== Death ==
Emerick died from a heart attack on 2 October 2018, aged 72. He had been hospitalised two weeks beforehand after experiencing trouble walking, but was ruled to have been dehydrated. His manager, William Zabaleta, recalled talking to Emerick for the last time: "While on the phone, he had complications and dropped the phone. I called 911, but by the time they got there, it was too late. Geoff suffered from heart problems for a long time and had a pacemaker. When it's your time, it's your time. We lost a legend and a best friend to me and a mentor."

Paul McCartney commented on social media: "He was smart, fun-loving, and the genius behind many of the great sounds on our records. I'm shocked and saddened to have lost such a special friend."

== See also ==
- Outline of the Beatles
- The Beatles timeline
