= George Jones singles discography =

George Jones discography
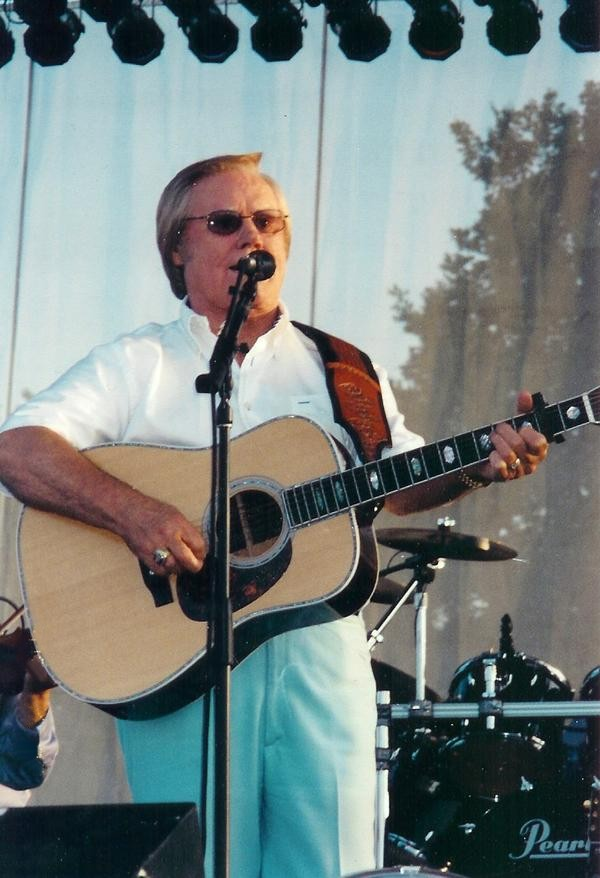
- Jones performing at Harrah's Metropolis in Metropolis, Illinois in June 2002
- Singles: 182
- Music videos: 21
- As a solo artist: 136
- As a collaborative artist: 31
- As a featured artist: 8
- Promotional singles: 7
- Other charted songs: 14

The singles discography of American country artist, George Jones, contains 182 singles. Of the total, 136 were released with Jones as the solo artist. In addition, 31 were issued with Jones being part of a collaboration (not counting his duets with Tammy Wynette). Thirdly, eight singles were issued with Jones being part of a featured act. Fourthly, seven released were promotional singles. Additionally, 14 songs that are not released as singles are included that made any major chart. Finally, 21 music videos which were first issued as singles are also listed. Jones had his first chart success in 1955 with several top ten Billboard Hot Country Songs singles: "Why Baby Why", "What Am I Worth" and "You Gotta Be My Baby". After several more top ten releases, "White Lightning" became his first to top the Billboard country chart. Along with "Who Shot Sam", both singles were also his first to make the Hot 100 charts.

During the sixties decade, Jones's success on the country charts continued. He reached the top of the Billboard country songs list twice in the early decade with "She Thinks I Still Care" and "Tender Years". He later topped the charts in 1967 with "Walk Through This World with Me". Among his highest-charting top ten singles that decade were "The Window Up Above" (1960), "Aching, Breaking Heart" (1962), "A Girl I Used to Know" (1962), "You Comb Her Hair" (1963), "The Race Is On" (1964), "As Long as I Live" (1968) and "I'll Share My World with You" (1969). Jones also collaborated with Margie Singleton, Melba Montgomery and Gene Pitney respectively during the decade. Among his collaborative releases with the artists were "Waltz of the Angels" (1962), "We Must Have Been Out of Our Minds" (1963) and "Things Have Gone to Pieces" (1965).

Jones had more commercial success during the seventies. He reached the number one spot on both the Billboard and RPM country charts with "The Grand Tour" (1974) and "The Door" (1974). Most of his singles reached the top ten during the first half of the decade: "A Good Year for the Roses" (1970), "Right Won't Touch a Hand" (1971), "Loving You Could Never Be Better" (1972) and "A Picture of Me (Without You)" (1973). As the seventies progressed, his singles reached the top ten and top 20 with less frequency. In 1980, Jones returned to the number one spot with "He Stopped Loving Her Today". It was followed in the eighties by the chart-topping singles "Still Doin' Time" (1981) and "I Always Get Lucky with You" (1983). Thirteen additional singles reached the top ten during the eighties. Among his most successful were "I'm Not Ready Yet" (1980), "Shine On (Shine All Your Sweet Love on Me)" (1982), "She's My Rock" (1984), "Who's Gonna Fill Their Shoes" and "I'm a One-Woman Man" (1988).

Jones's singles continued to make charting positions into the nineties. The songs "You Couldn't Get the Picture" (1991), "I Don't Need Your Rockin' Chair" (1992), "High-Tech Redneck" (1993) and "Choices" (1999) reached the top 40 of the Billboard country list. In the 2000s, a duet with Garth Brooks reached the top 40 of the country chart. During the nineties, Jones was featured on several singles by other artists. Both "A Few Ole Country Boys" (a duet with Randy Travis) and "You Don't Seem to Miss Me" (a duet with Patty Loveless) made the top 20 of the Billboard country chart.

== As a solo artist ==
=== 1950s ===
List of singles, with selected chart positions, showing other relevant details
Year	Title	Peak chart positions		Album
Year	Title	US	US Cou.	Album
1954	"No Money in This Deal"	—	—	—N/a
1954	"Play It Cool, Man"	—	—	Grand Ole Opry's New Star
1954	"Let Him Know"	—	—	Grand Ole Opry's New Star
1954	"You All Goodnight"	—	—	—N/a
1955	"Hold Everything"	—	—	Grand Ole Opry's New Star
1955	"Why Baby Why"	—	4	Grand Ole Opry's New Star
1955	"What Am I Worth"	—	7	Grand Ole Opry's New Star
1956	"I'm Ragged But I'm Right"	—	—	Grand Ole Opry's New Star
1956	"Rock It" (credited as Thumper Jones)	—	—	—N/a
1956	"You Gotta Be My Baby"	—	7	Grand Ole Opry's New Star
1956	"Boat of Life"	—	—	Grand Ole Opry's New Star
1956	"Just One More" (Note: Songs released as double A-side singles.)	—	3	George Jones Singing 14 Top Country Favorites
1956	"Gonna Come Get You" (Note: Songs released as double A-side singles.)	—	3	George Jones Singing 14 Top Country Favorites
1957	"Don't Stop the Music" (Note: Songs released as double A-side singles.)	—	10	George Jones Singing 14 Top Country Favorites
1957	"Uh Uh No" (Note: Songs released as double A-side singles.)	—	10	George Jones Singing 14 Top Country Favorites
1957	"Too Much Water"	—	13	George Jones Singing 14 Top Country Favorites
1957	"Tall, Tall Trees"	—	—	—N/a
1957	"Cup of Loneliness"	—	—	Country Church Time
1957	"A New Baby for Christmas"	—	—	—N/a
1958	"Color of the Blues"	—	7	—N/a
1958	"Wandering Soul"	—	—	Country Church Time
1958	"Treasure of Love"	—	6	—N/a
1958	"If I Don't Love You (Grits Ain't Groceries)" (Note: B-side to "Treasure of Love".)	—	29	—N/a
1959	"White Lightning"	73	1	George Jones Sings White Lightning and Other Favorites
1959	"Who Shot Sam"	93	7	—N/a
1959	"If You Want to Wear a Crown"	—	—	Country Church Time
1959	"Big Harlan Taylor"	—	19	The Novelty Side of George Jones
1959	"Money to Burn" (Note: B-side to "Big Harlan Taylor".)	—	15	The Novelty Side of George Jones
"—" denotes a recording that did not chart or was not released in that territory.

=== 1960s ===
List of singles, with selected chart positions, showing other relevant details
Year	Title	Peak chart positions				Album
Year	Title	US	US Bub.	US Cou.	CAN Cou.	Album
1960	"Accidentally on Purpose"	—	—	16	—	—N/a
1960	"Have Mercy on Me"	—	—	—	—	—N/a
1960	"Out of Control"	—	—	25	—	—N/a
1960	"The Window Up Above"	—	—	2	—	—N/a
1960	"Family Bible"	—	—	16	—	—N/a
1961	"Tender Years"	—	—	1	—	George Jones Sings from the Heart
1962	"Aching, Breaking Heart"	—	—	5	—	George Jones Sings from the Heart
1962	"She Thinks I Still Care"	—	—	1	—	The New Favorites of George Jones
1962	"Beacon in the Night"	—	—	—	—	Homecoming in Heaven
1962	"Open Pit Mine"	—	—	13	—	The New Favorites of George Jones
1962	"Magic Valley"	—	—	—	—	Homecoming in Heaven
1962	"A Girl I Used to Know""	—	—	3	—	George Jones Sings More New Favorites
1962	"Big Fool of the Year" (Note: B-side to "A Girl I Used to Know".)	—	—	13	—	George Jones Sings More New Favorites
1962	"Not What I Had in Mind"	—	—	7	—	George Jones Sings More New Favorites
1962	"Lonely Christmas Call"	—	—	—	—	The Classic Christmas Album
1963	"I Saw Me" (Note: B-side to "Not What I Had in Mind".)	—	—	29	—	I Wish Tonight Would Never End
1963	"Ain't It Funny What a Fool Will Do" (Note: B-side to "You Comb Her Hair".)	—	24	—	—	I Wish Tonight Would Never End
1963	"You Comb Her Hair"	—	—	5	—	George Jones Sings More New Favorites
1964	"Your Heart Turned Left (And I Was on the Right)"	—	—	5	—	George Jones Sings More New Favorites
1964	"My Tears Are Overdue"	—	—	15	—	George Jones Sings More New Favorites
1964	"Where Does a Little Tear Come From"	—	—	10	—	I Get Lonely in a Hurry
1964	"Something I Dreamed" (Note: B-side to "Where Does a Little Tear Come From".)	—	—	31	—	I Get Lonely in a Hurry
1964	"The Race Is On"	96	—	3	—	I Get Lonely in a Hurry
1965	"Least of All"	—	—	15	—	I Get Lonely in a Hurry
1965	"Love Bug"	—	—	6	—	Love Bug
1965	"Take Me"	—	—	8	—	Love Bug
1966	"I'm a People"	—	—	6	—	I'm a People
1966	"Old Brush Arbors"	—	—	30	—	Old Brush Arbors
1966	"Four-O-Thirty Three"	—	—	5	—	We Found Heaven Right Here on Earth at "4033"
1967	"Walk Through This World with Me"	—	—	1	—	Walk Through This World with Me
1967	"I Can't Get There from Here"	—	—	5	—	George Jones Sings the Songs of Dallas Frazier
1967	"Take the World But Give Me Jesus"	—	—	—	—	Cup of Loneliness
1967	"If My Heart Had Windows"	—	—	7	—	If My Heart Had Windows
1968	"Say It's Not You"	—	—	8	—	If My Heart Had Windows
1968	"Small Time Laboring Man"	—	—	35	—	Cup of Loneliness
1968	"As Long as I Live"	—	—	3	6	My Country
1968	"Milwaukee, Here I Come" (with Brenda Carter)	—	—	12	—	I'll Share My World with You
1968	"When the Grass Grows Over Me"	—	—	2	2	I'll Share My World with You
1969	"I'll Share My World with You" (Note: "I'll Share My World with You" did not enter the Hot 100, but peaked at number 24 on Bubbling Under Hot 100 Singles, which acts as a 25-song extension of the Hot 100.)	—	—	2	2	I'll Share My World with You
1969	"If Not for You"	—	—	6	16	Where Grass Won't Grow
1969	"She's Mine"	—	—	6	33	Where Grass Won't Grow
1969	"No Blues Is Good News" (Note: B-side to "She's Mine".)	—	72	36		Where Grass Won't Grow
"—" denotes a recording that did not chart or was not released in that territory.

=== 1970s ===
List of singles, with selected chart positions, showing other relevant details
Year	Title	Peak chart positions			Album
Year	Title	US Bub.	US Cou.	CAN Cou.	Album
1970	"Where Grass Won't Grow"	—	28	31	Where Grass Won't Grow
1970	"Going Life's Way"	—	—	—	George Jones with Love
1970	"Tell Me My Lying Eyes Are Wrong"	—	13	31	The Best of George Jones
1970	"A Good Year for the Roses"	12	2	4	George Jones with Love
1971	"Sometimes You Just Can't Win"	—	10	7	First in the Hearts of Country Music Lovers
1971	"Right Won't Touch a Hand"	—	7	10	First in the Hearts of Country Music Lovers
1971	"I'll Follow You (Up to Our Cloud)"	—	13	—	George Jones with Love
1972	"We Can Make It"	—	6	4	George Jones (We Can Make It)
1972	"Loving You Could Never Be Better"	—	2	1	George Jones (We Can Make It)
1972	"A Picture of Me (Without You)"	—	5	13	A Picture of Me (Without You)
1973	"What My Woman Can't Do"	—	6	—	Nothing Ever Hurt Me (Half as Bad as Losing You)
1973	"Nothing Ever Hurt Me (Half as Bad as Losing You)"	—	7	8	Nothing Ever Hurt Me (Half as Bad as Losing You)
1973	"Once You've Had the Best"	—	3	65	The Grand Tour
1974	"The Grand Tour"	—	1	2	The Grand Tour
1974	"The Door"	—	1	1	The Best of George Jones (1975)
1975	"These Days (I Barely Get By)"	—	10	9	The Best of George Jones (1975)
1975	"Memories of Us"	—	21	20	Memories of Us
1975	"I Just Don't Give a Damn" (Note: B-side to "Memories of Us".)	—	92	—	Memories of Us
1976	"The Battle"	—	16	31	The Battle
1976	"You Always Look Your Best (Here in My Arms)"	—	37	—	The Battle
1976	"Her Name Is"	—	3	3	Alone Again
1977	"Old King Kong"	—	34	—	I Wanta Sing
1977	"If I Could Put Them All Together (I'd Have You)"	—	24	25	I Wanta Sing
1977	"Bartender's Blues"	—	6	8	Bartender's Blues
1978	"I'll Just Take It Out in Love"	—	11	41	Bartender's Blues
1979	"Someday My Day Will Come"	—	22	—	Still the Same Ole Me
"—" denotes a recording that did not chart or was not released in that territory.

=== 1980s ===
List of singles, with selected chart positions, showing other relevant details
Year	Title	Peak chart positions		Album
Year	Title	US Cou.	CAN Cou.	Album
1980	"He Stopped Loving Her Today"	1	2	I Am What I Am
1980	"I'm Not Ready Yet"	2	4	I Am What I Am
1980	"If Drinkin' Don't Kill Me (Her Memory Will)"	8	25	I Am What I Am
1981	"Still Doin' Time"	1	2	Still the Same Ole Me
1982	"Same Ole Me" (with The Oak Ridge Boys)	5	1	Still the Same Ole Me
1982	"Shine On (Shine All Your Sweet Love on Me)"	3	8	Shine On
1983	"I Always Get Lucky with You"	1	6	Shine On
1983	"Tennessee Whiskey"	2	1	Shine On
1984	"You've Still Got a Place in My Heart"	3	6	You've Still Got a Place in My Heart
1984	"She's My Rock"	2	1	Ladies' Choice
1984	"Hallelujah, I Love You So" (with Brenda Lee)	15	13	Ladies' Choice
1985	"Size Seven Round (Made of Gold)" (with Lacy J. Dalton)	19	11	Ladies' Choice
1985	"Who's Gonna Fill Their Shoes"	3	2	Who's Gonna Fill Their Shoes
1985	"The One I Loved Back Then (The Corvette Song)"	3	2	Who's Gonna Fill Their Shoes
1986	"Somebody Wants Me Out of the Way"	9	20	Who's Gonna Fill Their Shoes
1986	"Wine Colored Roses"	10	13	Wine Colored Roses
1987	"The Right Left Hand"	8	6	Wine Colored Roses
1987	"I Turn to You"	26	40	Wine Colored Roses
1987	"The Bird"	26	39	Too Wild Too Long
1988	"I'm a Survivor"	52	—	Too Wild Too Long
1988	"The Old Man No One Loves"	63	—	Too Wild Too Long
1988	"If I Could Bottle This Up" (with Shelby Lynne)	43	—	Friends in High Places
1988	"I'm a One-Woman Man"	5	5	One Woman Man
1989	"The King Is Gone (So Are You)" (Note: "The King Is Gone (So Are You)" was originally titled "Ya Ba Da Ba Do (So Are You)", but was re-titled shortly after release.)	26	31	One Woman Man
1989	"Writing on the Wall"	31	29	One Woman Man
1989	"Radio Lover"	62	83	One Woman Man
"—" denotes a recording that did not chart or was not released in that territory.

=== 1990s ===
List of singles, with selected chart positions, showing other relevant details
Year	Title	Peak chart positions		Album
Year	Title	US Cou.	CAN Cou.	Album
1990	"Hell Stays Open (All Night Long)"	— (Note: "Hell Stays Open (All Night Long)" did not chart on Hot Country Songs, but peaked at No. 1 on Hot Country Radio Breakouts.)	—	You Oughta Be Here with Me
1990	"Six Foot Deep, Six Foot Down"	— (Note: "Six Foot Deep, Six Foot Down" did not chart on Hot Country Songs, but peaked at No. 3 on Hot Country Radio Breakouts.)	—	You Oughta Be Here with Me
1991	"All Fall Down" (with Emmylou Harris)	—	84	Friends in High Places
1991	"You Couldn't Get the Picture"	32	52	And Along Came Jones
1991	"She Loved a Lot in Her Time"	55	82	And Along Came Jones
1992	"Honky Tonk Myself to Death"	60	98	And Along Came Jones
1992	"I Don't Need Your Rockin' Chair"	34	63	Walls Can Fall
1993	"Wrong's What I Do Best"	65	—	Walls Can Fall
1993	"Walls Can Fall"	—	—	Walls Can Fall
1993	"High-Tech Redneck"	24	62	High-Tech Redneck
1994	"Never Bit a Bullet Like This" (with Sammy Kershaw)	52	—	High-Tech Redneck
1994	"A Good Year for the Roses" (with Alan Jackson)	56	65	The Bradley Barn Sessions
1996	"Honky Tonk Song"	66	—	I Lived to Tell It All
1996	"Billy B. Bad"	—	—	I Lived to Tell It All
1998	"Wild Irish Rose"	—	—	It Don't Get Any Better Than This
1999	"Choices"	30	30	Cold Hard Truth
1999	"The Cold Hard Truth"	45	—	Cold Hard Truth
"—" denotes a recording that did not chart or was not released in that territory.

=== 2000s ===
List of singles, with selected chart positions, showing other relevant details
Year	Title	Peak chart positions		Album
Year	Title	US Bub.	US Cou.	Album
2000	"Sinners and Saints"	—	55	Cold Hard Truth
2001	"The Man He Was"	—	47	The Rock: Stone Cold Country 2001
2001	"Beer Run (B Double E Double Are You In?)" (with Garth Brooks)	18	24	The Rock: Stone Cold Country 2001
2002	"50,000 Names"	—	55	The Rock: Stone Cold Country 2001
2005	"The Blues Man" (with Dolly Parton)	—	—	Hits I Missed...And One I Didn't
2008	"You and Me and Time" (with Georgette Jones)	—	—	Burn Your Playhouse Down
2013	"He Stopped Loving Her Today" (re-entry) (Note: Following the death of George Jones in 2013, "He Stopped Loving Her Today" re-entered the Hot Country Songs chart.)	—	21	I Am What I Am
"—" denotes a recording that did not chart or was not released in that territory.

== As a collaborative artist ==
List of singles, with selected chart positions, showing other relevant details
Year	Title	Peak chart positions				Album
Year	Title	US	US Cou.	CAN Cou.	AUS	Album
1954	"Wrong About You" (with Sonny Burns)	—	—	—	—	—N/a
1954	"Heartbroken Me" (with Sonny Burns)	—	—	—	—	—N/a
1957	"Yearning" (with Jeanette Hicks)	—	10	—	—	—N/a
1957	"Flame in My Heart" (with Virginia Spurlock)	—	—	—	—	—N/a
1958	"I'm with the Wrong One" (with Jeanette Hicks)	—	—	—	—	—N/a
1961	"Did I Ever Tell You" (with Margie Singleton)	—	15	—	—	Duets Country Style
1962	"Waltz of the Angels" (with Margie Singleton)	—	11	—	—	Duets Country Style
1962	"When Two Worlds Collide" (with Margie Singleton)	—	—	—	—	Duets Country Style
1963	"We Must Have Been Out of Our Minds" (with Melba Montgomery)	—	3	—	—	What's in Our Hearts
1963	"I Don't Hear You" (with Margie Singleton)	—	—	—	—	Duets Country Style
1963	"Let's Invite Them Over" (with Melba Montgomery)	—	17	—	—	What's in Our Hearts
1963	"What's in Our Heart" (with Melba Montgomery) (Note: B-side to "Let's Invite Them Over".)	—	20	—	—	What's in Our Hearts
1964	"Please Be My Love" (with Melba Montgomery)	—	31	—	—	Bluegrass Hootenanny
1964	"Multiply the Heartaches" (with Melba Montgomery)	—	25	—	—	What's in Our Hearts
1965	"Things Have Gone to Pieces" (with Gene Pitney)	—	9	—	—	For the First Time! Two Great Stars - George Jones and Gene Pitney
1965	"I've Got Five Dollars and It's Saturday Night" (with Gene Pitney)	99	16	—	65	For the First Time! Two Great Stars - George Jones and Gene Pitney
1965	"House of Gold" (with Melba Montgomery)	—	—	—	—	Bluegrass Hootenanny
1965	"Louisiana Man" (with Gene Pitney)	—	25	—	—	It's Country Time Again!
1965	"I Let You Go" (with Melba Montgomery)	—	—	—	—	Blue Moon of Kentucky
1965	"I'm a Fool to Care" (with Gene Pitney) (Note: B-side to "Louisiana Man".)	—	15	—	—	For the First Time! Two Great Stars - George Jones and Gene Pitney
1965	"Big Job" (with Gene Pitney)	—	50	—	—	It's Country Time Again!
1965	"Blue Moon of Kentucky" (with Melba Montgomery)	—	—	—	—	Blue Moon of Kentucky
1966	"That's All It Took" (with Gene Pitney)	—	47	—	—	It's Country Time Again!
1966	"Close Together (As You and Me)" (with Melba Montgomery)	—	70	—	—	Close Together (As You and Me)
1967	"Party Pickin'" (with Melba Montgomery)	—	24	—	—	Party Pickin'
1969	"The Lonesome End of Love" (with Brenda Carter)	—	—	—	—	—N/a
1974	"The Telephone Call" (credited as Tina & Daddy)	—	25	—	—	George & Tammy & Tina
1978	"Mabellene" (with Johnny Paycheck)	—	7	4	—	Double Trouble
1979	"You Can Have Her" (with Johnny Paycheck)	—	14	26	—	Double Trouble
1980	"When You're Ugly Like Us (You Just Naturally Got to Be Cool)" (with Johnny Paycheck)	—	31	29	—	Double Trouble
1980	"You Better Move On" (with Johnny Paycheck)	—	18	25		Double Trouble
1982	"Yesterday's Wine" (with Merle Haggard)	—	1	5	—	A Taste of Yesterday's Wine
1982	"C.C. Waterback" (with Merle Haggard)	—	10	18	—	A Taste of Yesterday's Wine
"—" denotes a recording that did not chart or was not released in that territory.

== As a featured artist ==
List of singles, with selected chart positions and certifications, showing other relevant details
Year	Title	Peak chart positions			Certifications	Album
Year	Title	US	US Cou.	CAN Cou.	Certifications	Album
1983	"We Didn't See a Thing" (Ray Charles with Chet Atkins and George Jones)	—	6	7		Friendship
1985	"One Big Family" (credited as the Heart of Nashville)	—	61	—		—N/a
1990	"A Few Ole Country Boys" (Randy Travis featuring George Jones)	—	8	4		Heroes & Friends
1997	"You Don't Seem to Miss Me" (Patty Loveless with George Jones)	— (Note: "You Don't Seem to Miss Me" did not enter the Hot 100, but peaked at number 9 on Bubbling Under Hot 100 Singles, which acts as a 25-song extension of the Hot 100.)	14	37		Long Stretch of Lonesome
1999	"A Country Boy Can Survive" (Chad Brock featuring George Jones and Hank Williams, Jr.)	75	30	66		Yes!
2002	"She Treats Her Body Like a Temple" (Confederate Railroad with George Jones)	—	59	—		Unleashed
2005	"4th of July" (Shooter Jennings featuring George Jones)	—	26	—		Put the "O" Back in Country
2010	"Country Boy" (Aaron Lewis featuring Charlie Daniels and George Jones)	87	50	—	RIAA: Platinum	Town Line
"—" denotes a recording that did not chart or was not released in that territory.

== Promotional singles ==
List of singles, with selected chart positions, showing other relevant details
Year	Title	Peak chart positions		Album
Year	Title	US Cou.	CAN Cou.	Album
1962	"You're Still on My Mind"	28	—	Country & Western No. 1 Male Singer
1964	"The Last Town I Painted"	39	—	The Ballad Side of George Jones
1965	"Wrong Number"	14	—	George Jones Sings More New Favorites
1965	"What's Money"	40	—	Country Get-Together
1966	"World's Worst Loser"	46	—	The Race Is On
1972	"A Day in the Life of a Fool"	30	—	George Jones with Love
1972	"Wrapped Around Her Finger"	46	48	Wrapped Around Her Finger
"—" denotes a recording that did not chart or was not released in that territory.

== Music videos ==
Year	Title	Director
1985	"One Big Family" (Heart of Nashville)	Steve Von Hagel
1985	"Who's Gonna Fill Their Shoes?"	Marc Ball
1987	"The Old Man No One Loves"	Marc Ball
1991	"She Loved a Lot in Her Time"	Marc Ball
1991	"You Couldn't Get the Picture"	Marc Ball
1992	"I Don't Need Your Rockin' Chair"	Marc Ball
1993	"Wrong's What I Do Best"	Marc Ball
1993	"Walls Can Fall"	Marc Ball
1993	"High Tech Redneck"	Marc Ball
1994	"The Love in Your Eyes"	Marc Ball
1994	"A Good Year for the Roses" (with Alan Jackson)	Gerry Wenner
1995	"One" (with Tammy Wynette)	
1996	"Honky Tonk Song"	Marc Ball
1998	"Wild Irish Rose"	John Lloyd Miller
1999	"Choices"	Greystone Communications
1999	"The Cold Hard Truth"	Jim Shea
2000	"Angel Band" (with Vestal Goodman)	
2002	"50,000 Names"	
2005	"The Blues Man" (with Dolly Parton)	Joe Thomas
2006	"Funny How Time Slips Away"	
2010	"Country Boy" (with Chris Young, Charlie Daniels and Aaron Lewis)	Alex Castino

== See also ==
- George Jones albums discography
