= The Crown Prince of Country Music =

Compilation album by George Jones
- Released: January 1960; May 5, 2015 (reissue)
- Recorded: January 19, 1954 – December 12, 1957
- Studio: Gold Star, Houston; Bradley Studios, Nashville, Tennessee
- Genre: Country
- Length: 27:20 (Original); 1:11:32 (Reissue/Bonus)
- Label: Starday (Original); Hoodoo Records (Reissue/Bonus)
- Producer: Don Pierce

George Jones chronology
White Lightning and Other Favorites (1959)	The Crown Prince of Country Music (1960)	Salutes Hank Williams (1960)

George Jones Starday chronology
Hillbilly Top Parade, Vol. 2 (1957)	The Crown Prince of Country Music (1960)	The Fabulous Country Music (1962)

The Crown Prince of Country Music is the 1960 country music compilation album released by Starday Records of previously unissued recordings released in January 1960. The album's original release, like the reissue edition, did not chart.

The album repackages many of Jones' early recordings that were previously made available to the public in other record formats. The oldest track dates back to Jones' first session in January 1954. The album's reissue in 2015 included the previous LP release of 1959, and bonus tracks of singles.

== Track listing ==
=== Original version ===
Side One
No.	Title	Writer(s)	Length
1.	"One Is a Lonely Number"	George Jones	2:33
2.	"Maybe Little Baby"	George Jones	2:05
3.	"Run Boy"	Hy Heath	2:16
4.	"I'm a One Woman Man"	Tillman Franks, Johnny Horton	1:52
5.	"Settle Down"	George Jones, L. Henderson	2:35
6.	"Heartbroken Me"	Red Hays, Irvin Russ	2:43

Side Two
No.	Title	Writer(s)	Length
1.	"Rain, Rain"	George Jones, Roger Miller, J.P. Richardson	2:12
2.	"Frozen Heart"	George Jones, Jimmy Yancey	2:12
3.	"I've Got Five Dollars and It's Saturday Night"	Ted Daffin	2:13
4.	"Cause I Love You"	Webb Pierce, Danny Dill	2:05
5.	"You're In My Heart"	George Jones	2:26
6.	"You All Goodnight"	George Jones, Madge Broadway	2:08

=== Reissue ===
Reissue Cover

Reissue
No.	Title	Writer(s)	Length
1.	"One Is a Lonely Number"	George Jones	2:33
2.	"Maybe Little Baby"	Jones	2:05
3.	"Run Boy"	Jones	2:16
4.	"I'm a One Woman Man"	Tillman Franks, Johnny Horton	1:52
5.	"Settle Down"	Jones, L. Henderson	2:35
6.	"Heartbroken Me (w/ Sonny Burns)"	Red Hays	2:43
7.	"Rain, Rain"	Jones, Roger Miller, J.P. Richardson	2:12
8.	"Frozen Heart"	Jones, Jimmy Yancey	2:12
9.	"I've Got Five Dollars and It's Saturday Night"	Ted Daffin	2:13
10.	"Cause I Love You"	Webb Pierce, Denny Hill	2:05
11.	"You're In My Heart"	Jones	2:26
12.	"You All Goodnight"	Jones	2:08
13.	"White Lightning"	J.P. Richardson	2:50
14.	"I'm With the Wrong One (w/ Virginia Spurlock)"	Earl Montgomery	2:13
15.	"That's the Way I Feel"	Jones, Miller	1:56
16.	"Life to Go"	Jones	2:56
17.	"Don't Do This to Me"	Jones	2:18
18.	"Wandering Soul"	Jones, Bill Dudley	2:27
19.	"Giveaway Girl"	Jones, Kessel	2:25
20.	"You're Back Again (w/ Virginia Spurlock)"	Jones, Hank Locklin	2:47
21.	"No Use to Cry"	Jones	2:15
22.	"Nothing Can Stop Me"	Jones, Miller	2:30
23.	"Flame In My Heart (w/ Virginia Spurlock)"	Jones, Spurlock	2:30
24.	"Jesus Wants Me"	Jones, Noack	1:59
25.	"Who Shot Sam"	Jones, Darrell Edwards, Ray Jackson	2:26
26.	"Treasure of Love"	Jones, Richardson	2:19
27.	"Color of the Blues"	Jones, Lawton Williams	2:52
28.	"Too Much Water"	Jones, Sonny James	2:11
29.	"Out of Control"	Jones, Edwards, Herbie Treece	2:38
30.	"Sparkling Brown Eyes"	Cox	2:34

== Personnel ==
- Hal Harris – guitar
- Benny Barnes – rhythm guitar
- Buck Henson – bass
- Link Davis – fiddle
- Doc Lewis – piano

== Reception ==
On Allmusic, Greg Adams wrote, "George Jones cut Starday Records' very first album, Grand Ole Opry's New Star, in 1956, and scored several hits for the label before moving to greener pastures at Mercury Records. Starday then issued The Crown Prince of Country Music in 1961 to capitalize on Jones' Mercury success by compiling an album of leftover tracks that had not previously appeared on album. As a result, there are no hits to be found, but rather an assortment of rarities such as the Hank Williams-esque ballad "You're in My Heart," which was the B-side of Jones' very first single, "There's No Money in This Deal." Elsewhere, Jones does his best Faron Young impression on "I've Got Five Dollars and It's Saturday Night," and flirts with rockabilly on "One Woman Man" and "Maybe Little Baby." Enthusiasts of Jones' early recordings will enjoy everything here, but the presentation is unfortunately marred by an electronically re-processed stereo effect. The Crown Prince of Country Music, like Jones' first album, Grand Ole Opry's New Star, contains a number of obscure tracks that have never been reissued on CD, so collectors can only hope that as these songs enter the public domain overseas, a comprehensive anthology of Jones' early sides will finally appear."
