= 1959 in country music =

This is a list of notable events in country music that took place in the year 1959.

== Events ==
- The first Grammy Award for outstanding performances in the country music genre is presented. The Kingston Trio wins the only country-specific award, for Best Country and Western Performance, with "Tom Dooley." It wouldn't be until 1965 when more country-specific Grammy categories were started. Until 1966 (when the Academy of Country Music began presenting awards), the Grammy Awards would be the only method to honor remarkable accomplishments in the genre.
- "Saga" songs, or stories where conflict was the central theme, rise in popularity. Notable examples include "The Battle of New Orleans" by Johnny Horton, "The Long Black Veil" by Lefty Frizzell, "Waterloo" by Stonewall Jackson and "El Paso" by Marty Robbins.
- A young sharecropper's son named Buck Owens scores his first significant chart hit with "Second Fiddle." That song, plus the follow-up – "Under Your Spell Again", his first Billboard Top 10 hit – provides country fans with the earliest examples of Owens' trademark "Bakersfield" sound.
- Dolly Parton records for the first time, on the small Goldband Records label. Her first recorded song is a rockabilly song called "Puppy Love."
- George Jones scores the first No. 1 of his 50-plus year career with "White Lightnin'." Jones would go on to become the first artist to have No. 1 hits in four consecutive decades, his last No. 1 hit coming in 1983 with "I Always Get Lucky with You."
- Johnny Horton's "The Battle Of New Orleans" is named the Billboard Year-End No. 1 song of the year on both the Billboard country and Hot 100 charts. To date, it is the only time this feat has occurred.

== Top hits of the year ==
=== Number one hits ===
==== United States ====
(as certified by Billboard)

Date	Single Name	Artist	Wks. No.1	Spec. Note
January 19	Billy Bayou	Jim Reeves	5
February 23	Don't Take Your Guns to Town	Johnny Cash	6
April 6	When It's Springtime in Alaska (It's Forty Below)	Johnny Horton	1	^{[A]}
April 13	White Lightning	George Jones	5	^{[A]}
May 18	The Battle of New Orleans	Johnny Horton	10	^{[1]}: Derived from an old American folk tune, "The 8th of January."; Song explains about the 1815 Battle of New Orleans from the perspective of an American soldier.
July 27	Waterloo	Stonewall Jackson	5	^{[A]}
August 31	The Three Bells	The Browns	11	^{[A]}: Also peaked at Number One on the Billboard Pop Chart.
November 9	Country Girl	Faron Young	4
December 7	The Same Old Me	Ray Price	2
December 21	El Paso	Marty Robbins	7	Also peaked at Number One on the Billboard Pop Chart.

Notes

- ^{1} No. 1 song of the year, as determined by Billboard.
- ^{A} First Billboard No. 1 hit for that artist.

=== Other major hits ===
US	Single	Artist
18	All the Time	Kitty Wells
9	Am I That Easy to Forget	Carl Belew
13	Anybody's Girl	Hank Thompson
15	The Best Years of Your Life	Carl Smith
11	Beyond the Shadow	The Browns
19	Big Harlan Taylor	George Jones
4	Big Midnight Special	Wilma Lee Cooper and Stoney Cooper
5	Black Land Farmer	Frankie Miller
9	Cabin in the Hills	Flatt & Scruggs
17	Chain Gang	Freddie Hart
6	Chasin' a Rainbow	Hank Snow
12	Chip Off the Old Block	Eddy Arnold
13	Cigarettes and Coffee Blues	Lefty Frizzell
20	Come and Knock (On the Door of My Heart)	Roy Acuff
4	Come Walk with Me	Wilma Lee Cooper and Stoney Cooper
2	Country Music is Here to Stay	Simon Crum
7	Dark Hollow	Jimmie Skinner
13	Dark Hollow	Luke Gordon
11	The Deck of Cards	Wink Martindale
19	Doggone That Train	Hank Snow
5	Don't Tell Me Your Troubles	Don Gibson
11	Draggin' the River	Ferlin Husky
7	Family Man	Frankie Miller
14	Five Feet High and Rising	Johnny Cash
9	Frankie's Man, Johnny	Johnny Cash
13	Frankie's Man, Johnny	Johnny Seay
5	Gotta Travel On	Billy Grammer
15	Gotta Travel On	Bill Monroe
9	Grin and Bear It	Jimmy C. Newman
16	Half-Breed	Marvin Rainwater
15	The Hanging Tree	Marty Robbins
2	Heartaches by the Number	Ray Price
2	Home	Jim Reeves
15	Homebreaker	Skeeter Davis
13	How Can I Think of Tomorrow	James O'Gwynn
2	I Ain't Never	Webb Pierce
12	I Cried a Tear	Ernest Tubb
4	I Got Stripes	Johnny Cash
18	I'd Like to Be	Jim Reeves
16	I'll Catch You When You Fall	Charlie Walker
17	I'm Beginning to Forget You	Jim Reeves
3	I'm in Love Again	George Morgan
7	I've Run Out of Tomorrows	Hank Thompson
19	It's All My Heartache	Carl Smith
5	Jimmy Brown the Newsboy	Mac Wiseman
17	John Wesley Hardin	Jimmie Skinner
10	Johnny Reb	Johnny Horton
11	Katy Too	Johnny Cash
18	The Knoxville Girl	The Wilburn Brothers
19	The Knoxville Girl	The Louvin Brothers
20	Last Night at a Party	Faron Young
3	The Last Ride	Hank Snow
2	Life to Go	Stonewall Jackson
20	Little Dutch Girl	George Morgan
11	Lonesome Old House	Don Gibson
6	Long Black Veil	Lefty Frizzell
16	A Long Time Ago	Faron Young
8	Luther Played the Boogie	Johnny Cash
5	Mommy for a Day	Kitty Wells
9	My Baby's Gone	The Louvin Brothers
15	My Love and Little Me	Margie Bowes
14	My Reason for Leaving	Ferlin Husky
14	Next Time	Ernest Tubb
13	Ninety-Nine	Bill Anderson
7	Old Moon	Betty Foley
9	Partners	Jim Reeves
10	Poor Old Heartsick Me	Margie Bowes
17	Problems	The Everly Brothers
16	Sailor Man	Johnnie & Jack
19	Sal's Got a Sugar Lip	Johnny Horton
5	Set Him Free	Skeeter Davis
16	So Many Times	Roy Acuff
19	So Soon	Jimmy C. Newman
15	Soldier's Joy	Hawkshaw Hawkins
6	Somebody's Back in Town	The Wilburn Brothers
9	Ten Thousand Drums	Carl Smith
5	Tennessee Stud	Eddy Arnold
12	Thanks a Lot	Johnny Cash
14	That's the Way It's Gotta Be	Faron Young
7	That's What It's Like to Be Lonesome	Ray Price
12	That's What It's Like to Be Lonesome	Bill Anderson
3	There's a Big Wheel	Wilma Lee Cooper and Stoney Cooper
6	A Thousand Miles Ago	Webb Pierce
8	(Till) I Kissed You	The Everly Brothers
4	Under Your Spell Again	Buck Owens
5	Under Your Spell Again	Ray Price
19	What Am I Living For	Ernest Tubb
4	Which One Is to Blame	The Wilburn Brothers
3	Who Cares	Don Gibson
7	Who Shot Sam	George Jones
9	A Woman's Intuition	The Wilburn Brothers
17	Yankee, Go Home	Goldie Hill
13	You Dreamer You	Johnny Cash
18	You Take the Table and I'll Take the Chairs	Bob Gallion
7	You're Makin' a Fool Out of Me	Jimmy C. Newman
12	Your Wild Life's Gonna Get You Down	Kitty Wells

== Top new album releases ==
Album	Artist	Record Label
Greatest!	Johnny Cash	Sun
Gunfighter Ballads and Trail Songs	Marty Robbins	Columbia
Hymns by Johnny Cash	Johnny Cash	Columbia
I'll Sing You a Song and Harmonize Too	Skeeter Davis	RCA
'Satan Is Real	The Louvin Brothers	Capitol
Songs of Our Soil	Johnny Cash	Columbia

=== Other top new releases ===
Album	Artist	Record Label
After Dark	Kitty Wells	Decca
Beside the Still Waters	Mac Wiseman	Dot
Chet Atkins in Hollywood	Chet Atkins	RCA
George Jones Sings White Lightning and Other Favorites	George Jones	Mercury
Great Folk Ballads	Mac Wiseman	Dot
Have Guitar Will Travel	Eddy Arnold	RCA
Hum & Strum Along with Chet Atkins	Chet Atkins	RCA
Sweet Sounds by the Browns	The Browns	RCA
Thereby Hangs a Tale	Eddy Arnold	RCA

== Births ==
- January 7 — David Lee Murphy, singer-songwriter of the mid-1990s.
- March 2 — Larry Stewart, lead singer of the 1980s country pop group Restless Heart.
- May 4 — Randy Travis, key artist of the new traditionalist movement of the mid-1980s.
- June 15 – Jeff Stevens, singer, songwriter and producer.
- June 21 — Kathy Mattea, folk-styled country artist of the 1980s.
- June 27 — Lorrie Morgan, country star of the 1990s; daughter of Grand Ole Opry favorite George Morgan.
- July 20 — Radney Foster, songwriter and one half of the late-1980s duo Foster & Lloyd; also, a solo artist during the early 1990s.
- August 7 — Michael Peterson, singer of the latter half of the 1990s.
- September 14 — John Berry, singer-songwriter of the mid-1990s.
- October 13 — Marie Osmond, member of the Osmond family who enjoyed success in the country genre during the 1970s and 1980s.
- December 8 — Marty Raybon, lead singer of Shenandoah.

== Major awards ==
=== Grammy Awards ===
- Best Country and Western Performance — "Tom Dooley", The Kingston Trio

== Other links ==
- Country Music Association
