= The Race Is On (album) =

Studio album by George Jones
- Released: April 1965
- Genre: Country
- Label: United Artists
- Producer: Pappy Daily

George Jones chronology
I Get Lonely in a Hurry (1964)	The Race Is On (1965)	Mr. Country & Western Music (1965)

The Race Is On is an album by George Jones, released on United Artists in 1965.

The title track had been recorded in June 1963 but was not released until September 1964 on the album I Get Lonely in a Hurry and the single galloped to number 3 on the Billboard country chart.

== Reception ==
The album peaked at number three on the US country album chart. AllMusic said the album "is dominated by ballads, like the majority of his UA albums ... it boasts a stronger, more varied set of songs than most of his '60s albums ... the album remains one of his strongest from the mid-'60s."

== Track listing ==
No.	Title	Writer(s)	Length
1.	"The Race Is On"	Don Rollins	2:05
2.	"Don't Let the Stars Get in Your Eyes"	Slim Willet	2:23
3.	""I'll Never Let Go of You"	George Jones, George Riddle	2:20
4.	"She's Mine"	George Jones, Jack Ripley	2:35
5.	"Three's a Crowd"	George Jones, Darrell Edwards, Herby Treece	2:16
6.	"They'll Never Take Her Love from Me"	Leon Payne	2:29
7.	"Your Heart Turned Left (And I Was on the Right)"	Harlan Howard	2:10
8.	"Ain't It Funny What a Fool Will Do"	George Jones, "Country" Johnny Mathis	2:22
9.	"It Scares Me Half To Death"	Audrey Allison, Joe Allison	2:40
10.	"World's Worst Loser"	Autry Inman	2:34
11.	"Time Changes Everything"	Tommy Duncan	2:50
12.	"Take Me as I Am (Or Let Me Go)"	Boudleaux Bryant	2:32

== Chart performance ==
Chart (1965)	Peak position
US Top Country Albums (Billboard)	3
