= I Saw Me =

Single by George Jones

from the album I Wish Tonight Would Never End
- A-side: "Not What I Had in Mind"
- Released: January 1963
- Genre: Country
- Length: 2:48
- Label: United Artists
- Songwriter(s): George Jones, Gene Davis
- Producer(s): Pappy Daily

George Jones singles chronology
""Lonely Christmas Call""	"I Saw Me" (1963)	""You Comb Her Hair"" (1963)

"I Saw Me" is a ballad by American country singer George Jones. It was released as the B-side to "Not What I Had in Mind" and made the Top 30, peaking at #29. In the song, which Jones wrote with Gene Davis, the narrator experiences an awakening of his conscience as he recognizes his own misdeeds that brought an end to his relationship with a woman, lamenting, "Yes I looked into my eyes and saw the reason why she cries." Jones vocal delivery is more restrained than some of his other releases from the period, foreshadowing his more mature, stylistic singing in the years ahead. It was produced by Pappy Daily.

== Chart performance ==
Chart (1963)	Peak position
U.S. Billboard Hot Country Singles	29
