= My Tears Are Overdue =

Single by George Jones

from the album George Jones Sings More New Favorites
- A-side: "Your Heart Turned Left (And I Was on the Right)"
- Released: January 1964
- Recorded: 1963
- Genre: Country
- Length: 2:29
- Label: United Artists
- Songwriter: Freddie Hart
- Producer: Pappy Daily

George Jones singles chronology
"You Comb Her Hair" (1963)	"My Tears Are Overdue" (1964)	"Where Does a Little Tear Come From" (1964)

"My Tears Are Overdue" is a song by American country music artists George Jones. Composed by Freddie Hart, it was released as the B-side to "You're Heart Turned Left (And I Was on the Right)" and rose to #15 on the Billboard country singles chart. Although not a major hit, the song displays the virtuoso vocal talents that made Jones one of the most respected singers in the business. Jones was so hot on the charts in the early 1960s that several of his B-sides charted, including "Sometimes You Just Can't Win," "Big Fool of the Year," and "What's in Our Heart" (a duet with Melba Montgomery), and even hit the bottom of the pop charts with "Ain't It Funny What a Fool Will Do."

== Chart performance ==
Chart (1964)	Peak position
U.S. Billboard Hot Country Singles	15
