= 1960 in country music =

This is a list of notable events in country music that took place in 1960.

== Events ==
- February 1 – Loretta Lynn signs her very first record deal with Zero Records. This launches the singer into country music stardom.
- March 29 — Tootsie's Orchid Lounge, destined to become one of the most prominent of the honky tonk bars in Nashville, Tennessee, opens.
- August 27 — Louisiana Hayride puts on its final performance.
- September 24 — Final telecast of ABC-TV's Jubilee USA.
- November 5 — Johnny Horton is killed in a car accident near Milano, Texas, while returning from a concert in nearby Austin. Other passengers in his car – manager Tillman Franks and guitarist Tommy Tomlinson – are injured but survive.

=== No dates ===
- Just four songs – five, if one counts "El Paso" by Marty Robbins, which spent five of its seven weeks at No. 1 in 1960 – ascend to the No. 1 spot on Billboard's Hot C&W Sides chart. Those songs – listed below – would spend 14, 14, 12 and 10 weeks at No. 1, compared to 10 No. 1 songs in 1959 and eight for all of 1961. Just a quarter of a century later, it was common for 50 songs per year to play musical chairs atop Billboard's Hot Country Singles chart.
- The Chicago-based National Barn Dance moves from WLS to WGN-AM, where it will remain for the rest of its run.
- The Porter Wagoner Show, one of the most successful country music television programs, premieres on CBS late in the year. Norma Jean (Beasler) and comedian Speck Rhodes were the regulars, with guest performers appearing each week. The show ran in syndication for 21 years, and at its peak aired in more than 100 markets, and is largely credited for breaking the career of a young singer named Dolly Parton (who replaced Norma Jean in 1967).

== Top hits of the year ==
=== Number-one hits ===
==== United States ====
(as certified by Billboard)

Date	Single Name	Artist	Wks. No.1	Spec. Note
February 8	He'll Have to Go	Jim Reeves	14
May 16	Please Help Me, I'm Falling	Hank Locklin	14	^{[1]}^{[A]}: Locklin's first Billboard Number One since "Let Me Be the One" in 1953.
August 22	Alabam	Cowboy Copas	12	^{[B]}
November 14	Wings of a Dove	Ferlin Husky	10	^{[2]}^{[A]}: Husky's first Billboard Number One since "Gone" in 1957.

Notes

- ^{1} No. 1 song of the year, as determined by Billboard.
- ^{2} Song dropped from No. 1 and later returned to top spot.
- ^{A} Last Billboard No. 1 hit for that artist.
- ^{B} Only Billboard No. 1 hit for that artist to date.

=== Other major hits ===
US	Single	Artist
3	Above and Beyond	Buck Owens
16	Accidentally on Purpose	George Jones
8	Am I Losing You	Jim Reeves
11	Am I That Easy to Forget	Skeeter Davis
5	Amigo's Guitar	Kitty Wells
2	Another (Just Like Me)	Roy Drusky
3	Anymore	Roy Drusky
12	Are You Willing, Willie	Marion Worth
15	Baby Rocked Her Dolly	Frankie Miller
7	The Ballad of Wild River	Gene Woods
4	Before This Day Ends	George Hamilton IV
5	Big Iron	Marty Robbins
18	A Broken Dream	Jimmy Smart
16	But You Use To	Laverne Downs
16	Carmel by the Sea	Kitty Wells
9	Cruel Love	Lou Smith
19	Dead or Alive	Bill Anderson
12	Dear Mama	Merle Kilgore
17	(Doin' the) Lover's Leap	Webb Pierce
11	Drifting Texas Sand	Webb Pierce
4	Each Moment (Spent With You)	Ernest Ashworth
16	Ev'rybody's Somebody's Fool	Ernest Tubb
2	Excuse Me (I Think I've Got a Heartache)	Buck Owens
12	Eyes of Love	Margie Singleton
10	Face to the Wall	Faron Young
4	Fallen Angel	Webb Pierce
10	Family Bible	Claude Gray
11	Far, Far Away	Don Gibson
6	He'll Have to Stay	Jeanne Black
5	Heart to Heart Talk	Bob Wills and Tommy Duncan
13	Here I Am Drunk Again	Clyde Beavers
14	Hot Rod Lincoln	Charlie Ryan
17	How Far to Little Rock	The Stanley Brothers
2	(I Can't Help You) I'm Falling Too	Skeeter Davis
5	I Don't Believe I'll Fall in Love Today	Warren Smith
6	I Know One	Jim Reeves
20	I Love You Because	Johnny Cash
3	I Missed Me	Jim Reeves
7	I Think I Know	Marion Worth
5	I Wish I Could Fall in Love Today	Ray Price
19	I Wish You Love	Billy Walker
14	I'm a Honky Tonk Girl	Loretta Lynn
3	I'm Gettin' Better	Jim Reeves
14	I'm Movin' On	Don Gibson
19	Imitation of Love	Adrian Roland
11	Is It Wrong (For Loving You)	Webb Pierce
17	It's Not Wrong	Connie Hall
17	Johnny, My Love (Grandma's Diary)	Wilma Lee and Stoney Cooper
2	Just One Time	Don Gibson
18	The Key's in the Mailbox	Freddie Hart
5	Left to Right	Kitty Wells
9	Let's Think About Living	Bob Luman
15	Life of a Poor Boy	Stonewall Jackson
20	(Little Angel) Come Rock Me to Sleep	Ted Self
13	A Little Guy Called Joe	Stonewall Jackson
16	Lonely River Rhine	Bobby Helms
11	The Long Walk	Bill Leatherwood
10	Love Has Made You Beautiful	Merle Kilgore
6	A Lovely Work of Art	Jimmy C. Newman
12	Mary Don't You Weep	Stonewall Jackson
9	Miller's Cave	Hank Snow
15	Money to Burn	George Jones
16	The Moon Is Crying	Alan Riddle
16	Mule Skinner Blues	The Fendermen
4	No Love Have I	Webb Pierce
13	Nobody's Darling but Mine	Johnny Sea
20	The Old Lamplighter	The Browns
2	One More Time	Ray Price
13	The One You Slip Around With	Jan Howard
8	The Picture	Ray Godfrey
13	Pinball Machine	Lonnie Irving
13	Reasons to Live	Jimmie Skinner
4	Riverboat	Faron Young
14	Riverboat Gambler	Jimmie Skinner
7	Scarlet Ribbons (For Her Hair)	The Browns
10	Seasons of My Heart	Johnny Cash
15	Second Honeymoon	Johnny Cash
14	She's Just a Whole Lot Like You	Hank Thompson
6	Sink the Bismarck	Johnny Horton
10	A Six Pack to Go	Hank Thompson
13	Smiling Bill McCall	Johnny Cash
4	Softly and Tenderly (I'll Hold You in My Arms)	Lewis Pruitt
16	Straight A's in Love	Johnny Cash
5	That's My Kind of Love	Marion Worth
16	This Ole House	Wilma Lee and Stoney Cooper
10	Timbrook	Lewis Pruitt
7	The Tip of My Fingers	Bill Anderson
19	Too Much to Lose	Carl Belew
20	Until Today	Elmer Snodgrass
11	Wanting You with Me Tonight	Jimmy C. Newman
11	Who Will Buy the Wine	Charlie Walker
6	Why I'm Walkin'	Stonewall Jackson
5	Wishful Thinking	Wynn Stewart
18	World So Full of Love	Ray Sanders
8	You Can't Pick a Rose in December	Ernest Ashworth
4	You're the Only Good Thing (That's Happened to Me)	George Morgan
5	Your Old Used to Be	Faron Young

== Top new album releases ==
Album	Artist	Record Label
Blood on the Saddle	Tex Ritter	Capitol
Dutchman's Gold	Walter Brennan	Dot
Eddy Arnold Sings Them Again	Eddy Arnold	RCA
Goldie Hill	Goldie Hill	Decca
I'll Sing You a Song and Harmonize Too	Skeeter Davis	RCA
Johnny Horton Makes History	Johnny Horton	Columbia
Midnight Jamboree	Ernest Tubb & His Texas Troubadors, featuring Various Artists	Decca
More	Eddy Arnold	RCA
The Other Chet Atkins	Chet Atkins	RCA

=== Other album releases ===
Album	Artist	Record Label
George Jones Salutes Hank Williams	George Jones	Mercury
Seasons of My Heart	Kitty Wells	Decca
Sixteen Tons	Tennessee Ernie Ford	Capitol
Smoke, Smoke, Smoke	Tex Williams	Capitol
Teensville	Chet Atkins	RCA
Town and Country	The Browns	RCA Victor
A Tribute to the Delmore Brothers	Louvin Brothers	Capitol

== Births ==
- February 10 — Lionel Cartwright, neotraditionalist of the late 1980s and early 1990s.
- February 16 — Doug Phelps, lead singer of the Kentucky Headhunters.
- April 8 — John Schneider, singer and actor, best known for his 1980s hits and role as Bo Duke on CBS-TV series The Dukes of Hazzard.
- August 22 — Collin Raye, a favorite country artist of the 1990s.
- September 26 — Doug Supernaw, singer of the early 1990s ("I Don't Call Him Daddy") (d. 2020)
- November 4 — Kim Forester, member of The Forester Sisters.
- November 25 — Amy Grant, contemporary Christian singer, wife of Vince Gill.
- December 28 — Marty Roe, lead singer of Diamond Rio.
- December 28 — Marcus Hummon, Grammy Award-winning singer-songwriter ("Bless the Broken Road")

== Deaths ==
- January 19 — Ralph Peer, 67, pioneer in record engineering and production (pneumonia).
- May 13 — Gid Tanner, 74, fiddler and leader of pioneering country group the Skillet Lickers.
- November 5 — Johnny Horton, 35, "The Singing Fisherman" and best known for his Americana-styled hits (car accident).
- November 7 — A.P. Carter, 68, a member of The Original Carter Family, one of country music's all-time pioneers (heart disease).

== Major awards ==
=== Grammy Awards ===
- Best Country and Western Performance — "El Paso", Marty Robbins

=== Hollywood Walk of Fame ===
Country stars who got a star on the Hollywood Walk of Fame in 1960

Gene Autry, Roy Acuff, Glen Campbell, Lefty Frizzell, Red Foley, Tennessee Ernie Ford, Ferlin Husky, Sonny James, Pee Wee King, Frankie Laine, Buck Owens, Patti Page, Webb Pierce, Elvis Presley, Tex Ritter, Marty Robbins, Roy Rogers, Carl Smith, Ernest Tubb, Hank Williams, and Slim Whitman

== See also ==
- Country Music Association
