= Your Heart Turned Left (And I Was on the Right) =

Single by George Jones

from the album George Jones Sings More New Favorites
- B-side: "My Tears Are Overdue"
- Released: January 1964
- Recorded: 1963
- Genre: Country
- Length: 2:16
- Label: United Artists
- Songwriter: Harlan Howard
- Producer: Pappy Daily

George Jones singles chronology
"You Comb Her Hair" (1963)	"Your Heart Turned Left (And I Was on the Right)" (1964)	"Where Does a Little Tear Come From" (1964)

"Your Heart Turned Left (And I Was on the Right)" is a song by George Jones and written by Harlan Howard. It was originally released in 1956 as "Your Heart" on his Grand Ole Opry's New Star album. It was re-released on his 1964 album, Sings More New Favorites, as "You're Heart Turned Left (And I Was on the Right)", and released as a single in January 1964, reaching the number 5 position on the Billboard country singles chart, and number 7 on the Cashbox Magazine country top 50 chart.

At this point in his career, Jones had taken his place as one of the premiere balladeers of country music, but he always retained a soft spot for novelty numbers going back to his first recordings for Starday in the mid-fifties. "I've always tried to be versatile," he reflected in the 1989 video biography Same Ole Me. "I've always tried to do up-tempos, novelties, and ballads." The single was Jones' third top ten hit in a row.
