= George Jones Salutes Hank Williams =

Studio album by George Jones
- Released: May 1960
- Recorded: April 21, 1960
- Studio: Bradley Studios, Nashville, Tennessee
- Genre: Country
- Length: 29:42
- Label: Mercury
- Producer: Shelby Singleton

George Jones chronology
The Crown Prince of Country Music (1960)	George Jones; Salutes Hank Williams (1960)	Sings Country and Western Hits (1962)

Singles from Salutes Hank Williams
- 1. "Cold, Cold Heart (b-side)" Released: July 14, 1962

George Jones Salutes Hank Williams is the 1960 country music studio album released in May 1960 by George Jones. The album was the ninth studio LP release, and was recorded in one session. The album has been reissued multiple times since its release, including the tracks being reused on many compilations.

The album was his second album release of the 1960s, and is one of the best sounding albums recorded with Mercury Records. Though the album didn't chart, however, it became one of his best sellers. All of the songs included were recorded by Hank Williams at some point in his short-lived career, and during this time of Jones' career, he had incorporated much of Williams singing style into his style.

== Track listing ==
Side One
No.	Title	Writer(s)	Length
1.	"Cold Cold Heart"	Hank Williams	3:21
2.	"Nobody's Lonesome for Me"	H. Williams	2:11
3.	"Hey Good Lookin'"	H. Williams	2:47
4.	"Howlin' at the Moon"	H. Williams	2:50
5.	"There'll Be No Teardrops Tonight"	H. Williams	2:23
6.	"Half As Much"	Curley Williams	2:14

Side Two
No.	Title	Writer(s)	Length
1.	"Jambalaya (On the Bayou)"	H. Williams	2:09
2.	" Why Don't You Love Me"	H. Williams	2:06
3.	"Honky Tonkin'"	H. Williams	2:27
4.	"I Can't Help It"	H. Williams	2:25
5.	"Settin' the Woods on Fire"	Ed G. Nelson, Fred Rose	2:11
6.	"Window Shopping"	Marcel Joseph	2:27

Reissue cover

== Reception ==
Professional ratings
Review scores
Source	Rating
Allmusic	4/5 stars

The album became one of his very best sellers, and is some of Jones' best recordings during his time with Mercury Records from 1957-1962. Allmusic's Stephen Thomas Erlewine writes: "George Jones Salutes Hank Williams was recorded at Mercury Records, toward the beginning of Jones' career. At this stage, George still sounded similar to Hank Williams, but he had begun to incorporate much of Williams' vocal techniques into a distinctive vocal style of his own. If Jones had recorded these songs while still at Starday, they wouldn't be as exciting as they are now -- since he had moved beyond mimicking into his own style, he's able to invest Williams' songs with grit and passion, instead of just copying Hank. It's an affectionate, entertaining tribute, featuring some of the greatest songs ("Cold Cold Heart," "Hey Good Lookin'," "Half As Much," "Jambalaya," "Why Don't You Love Me," "Honky Tonkin'," "Settin' the Woods on Fire") in country music.
