= Treasure of Love =

Treasure of Love may refer to:

- Treasure of Love (George Jones song), 1958
- Treasure of Love (Clyde McPhatter song), 1956
