= Mr. Country & Western Music =

Studio album by George Jones
- Released: April 1965
- Genre: Country
- Length: 29:56
- Label: Musicor
- Producer: Pappy Daily

George Jones chronology
The Race Is On (1965)	Mr. Country & Western Music (1965)	New Country Hits (1965)

Professional ratings
Review scores
Source	Rating
AllMusic	3/5 stars

Mr. Country & Western Music is an album by American country music artist George Jones released in 1965 on the Musicor Records label. The album features twelve tracks of traditional country music, emphasizing themes of lost love, loneliness, and emotional resilience through Jones's emotive vocal delivery in the honky-tonk style.

Produced by Pappy Daily, the album includes original compositions and covers, such as Hank Cochran's "Don't You Ever Get Tired of Hurtin' Me" and songs penned by Joe Poovey like "How Proud I Would Have Been" and "Worst of Luck." Notable tracks also encompass "I Just Lost My Favorite Girl," "Even the Bad Times Are Good," and "The Selfishness in Man," are supported by backing vocals from The Jordanaires and instrumentation featuring musicians like Grady Martin on guitar and Buddy Harman on drums.

Jones re-recorded "Don't You Ever Get Tired (Of Hurting Me) for his 1989 album One Woman Man.

== Track listing ==
No.	Title	Writer(s)	Length
1.	"I Just Lost My Favorite Girl"	Don Adams	2:37
2.	"What's Bad for You Is Good for Me"	Melba Montgomery, Carl Montgomery	2:19
3.	"Don't You Ever Get Tired (Of Hurting Me)"	Hank Cochran	2:15
4.	"How Proud I Would Have Been"	Joe Poovey	2:40
5.	"Flowers For Mama"	Eddie Noack, Marvin Rumley, Wayne P. Walker	2:48
6.	"Gonna Take Me Away from You"	George Jones, Darrell Edwards	2:24
7.	"I Can't Get Used to Being Lonely""	Earl Montgomery	2:35
8.	"Let a Little Loving Come In"	Leon Payne	2:17
9.	"The Selfishness in Man"	Payne	2:33
10.	"Worst of Luck"	Poovey	2:34
11.	"Even the Bad Times Are Good"	Carl Belew, Clyde Pitts	2:30
12.	"The Sea Between Our Hearts"	Darrell Edwards, Merle Moore	2:24

== Personnel ==
- The Jordanaires – vocal accompaniment
- Christian Zwarg - Mastering
- Jack Kaufman - Cover Design
- Paddy Daily - Producer
- Susan Winslow - Project Manager
- Bob Moore - Bass (uncredited)
- Buddy Harman - Drums (uncredited)
- Buddy Spicher - Fiddle (uncredited)
- Grady Martin - Guitar (uncredited)
- Harold Bradley - Guitar (Uncredited)
- Ray Edenton - Guitar (uncredited)
- Hargus Robbins - Piano (uncredited)
- Hal Rugg - Steel Guitar (Uncredited)
- Pete Drake - Steel Guitar - (uncredited)

== Chart performance ==
Chart (1965)	Peak position
US Top Country Albums (Billboard)	13
