= Wrong number (disambiguation) =

A wrong number is a telephone number dialed incorrectly. Wrong number may also refer to:

== Films ==
- Wrong Number (1959 film), a British film directed by Vernon Sewell
- Wrong Number (2002 film), an Indian Odia-language film, a remake of Ramji Rao Speaking (1989)
- Wrong Number (2004 film), a Bangladeshi film
- "Wrong Number", two different episodes from ChuckleVision, 1992, 2001
- "Wrong Number", an episode from Diagnosis: Murder, 1998
- Wrong No., a Pakistani film, 2015

== Music ==
- "Wrong Number" (The Cure song), 1997
- "Wrong Number" (George Jones song), 1964
- "Wrong Number", by Timothy B. Schmit from Playin' It Cool, 1984
- "Wrong Number", by TVXQ from Mirotic, 2008

== Other arts, entertainment, and media ==
- Wrong Number, a comic strip by Vince Evans
- The Wrong Number, a novel of Fear Street book series by R. L. Stine, 1990
- Hotline Miami 2: Wrong Number, a video game, 2015
