= I Wish Tonight Would Never End =

Studio album by George Jones
- Released: April 1963
- Recorded: March 1963
- Studio: Columbia (Nashville, Tennessee)
- Genre: Country
- Length: 30:15
- Label: United Artists
- Producer: Pappy Daily

George Jones chronology
My Favorites of Hank Williams (1962)	I Wish Tonight Would Never End (1963)	Blue & Lonesome (1964)

Singles from I Wish Tonight Would Never End
- 1. "I Saw Me" Released: January 28, 1963; 2. "Ain't It Funny What a Fool Will Do" Released: June 22, 1963

I Wish Tonight Would Never End is an album by American country music artist George Jones. It was released in 1963 on the United Artists record label.

I Wish Tonight Would Never End features two duets with Melba Montgomery, including the standard "We Must Have Been Out Of Our Minds", one of seven chart singles they would score together between 1963 and 1967. In the book George Jones: The Life and Times of a Honky Tonk Legend, Bob Allen quotes Jones: "Now, truthfully, Melba fit my style more than Tammy (Wynette) did. I hate to use the word 'hard-core,' but that's what Melba is - a down-to-earth, hard-core country singer." The other duet with Montgomery, "Flame In My Heart", was originally recorded by Jones and Virginia Spurlock when Jones was with Mercury Records. The songs would be included on the Jones/Montgomery duet album What's in Our Hearts, also released in 1963.

I Wish Tonight Would Never End also includes a more refined rerecording of "Seasons Of My Heart", a song Jones wrote with Darrell Edwards which had been one of his earliest recordings on the Starday label and had also been a hit for Johnny Cash (Jerry Lee Lewis and Willie Nelson would also cover the song).

Professional ratings
Review scores
Source	Rating
Allmusic	link

== Track listing ==
No.	Title	Writer(s)	Length
1.	"Lonesome Life"	George Jones, George Riddle	2:36
2.	"This Old Old House"	(Jones, Hal Bynum	2:26
3.	"I Saw Me"	Jones, Jimmie Davis	2:45
4.	"The Race is On"	Don Rollins	2:05
5.	"I Wish Tonight Would Never End"	Jones, "Country" Johnny Mathis	2:18
6.	"Flame in My Heart (with Melba Montgomery) "	Jones, Bernard Spurlock	2:27
7.	"Ain't It Funny What a Fool Will Do"	Jones, Mathis	2:22
8.	"There's No Justice"	Leon Payne	2:07
9.	"We Must Have Been Out of Our Minds (with Melba Montgomery)"	Melba Montgomery	2:36
10.	"I Can't Change Over Night"	Jones, Mathis	2:29
11.	"In the Shadow of a Lie"	Jones, Dick Overby	2:45
12.	"Seasons of My Heart"	Jones, Darrell Edwards)	2:50

== Charting Singles ==
Single	Chart	Peak position
I Saw Me	U.S. Billboard Hot Country Singles	29
Ain't It Funny What a Fool Will Do	US Bubbling Under Hot 100	24
