= If Not for You (disambiguation) =

"If Not for You" is a song by Bob Dylan, also covered by George Harrison and Olivia Newton-John.

If Not for You may also refer to:

- If Not for You (album), an album by Olivia Newton-John
- If Not for You (TV series), an American sitcom
- "If Not for You" (George Jones song), 1969
