= You All Goodnight =

Single by George Jones

from the album The Crown Prince of Country Music
- B-side: "Let Him Know"
- Released: September 25, 1954
- Recorded: June 1954
- Studio: Quinn Recording (Houston, Texas)
- Genre: Country
- Length: 2:04
- Label: Starday; Starday 162
- Songwriters: George Jones, Madge Broadway
- Producer: Pappy Daily

George Jones singles chronology
"Play It Cool, Man" (1954)	"You All Goodnight" (1954)	"Let Him Know" (1954)

"You All Goodnight" is a song by George Jones. Jones wrote the song with Marge Broadway and it was released as his third single on Starday Records, released on September 25, 1954.

== Recording and background ==
During Jones' third session, Jones recorded "You All Goodnight" in the living room of Bill Quinn (associate of producer Pappy Daily). Much like Jones' early work, the song was influenced heavily by Jones' favorite idol, Hank Williams. It was Jones' 7th overall recording since his first on January 19.

The b-side included one Jones' previously released song, "Let Him Know."

Recorded in the living room of Quinn at 5628 Brock Street in Houston, the recording facility was primitive. Former Starday president Don Pierce recalls to Allen, "The place was held together with chewing gum. There was egg cartons on the wall, just one microphone that hung down from the wooden ceiling beams...The control room was just another room in the house, and Bill couldn't see the musicians from there...everything was pretty much done in one take."

== Personnel ==
- George Jones (vocal, acoustic)
- Jimmy Biggar (steel)
- Bob Heppler (bass)
- Red Hayes (fiddle)
- Milburn "Burney" Annett (piano)
