= Color of the Blues =

Single by George Jones
- B-side: "Eskimo Pie"
- Released: January 15, 1958
- Genre: Country
- Length: 2:48
- Label: Mercury-Starday
- Songwriters: George Jones, Lawton Williams
- Producer: Pappy Daily

George Jones singles chronology
"A New Baby for Christmas" (1957)	"Color of the Blues" (1958)	"I'm With the Wrong One" (1958)

"Color of the Blues" is a 1958 country song written by George Jones and Lawton Williams and released by Jones on January 15, 1958.

== Background ==
By the time of the release of "Color of the Blues" in 1957, Jones had been releasing singles for three years and had scored four Top 10 hits: "Why Baby Why" (1955), "You Gotta Be My Baby" (1956), "Just One More" (1956), and "Don't Stop the Music" (1957). However, his three previous singles had failed to chart and, in the wake of Elvis Presley's explosion in popularity, he had even recorded a few half-hearted rockabilly sides with producer Pappy Daily. Jones was not discouraged, however, telling Ray Waddell of Billboard in a 2006 interview that he was just happy to have moved on from Starday Records: "When I went to Mercury I got my first halfway decent sounds. "Window [Up Above]" and "Color of the Blues" didn't sell that big, but they got me a lot of radio play."

== Composition ==
"Color of the Blues" is considered one of Jones' greatest earlier works, and he often performed it live during the late 1950s. According to Rich Kienzle's liner notes of the 1994 Song retrospective The Essential George Jones: The Spirit of Country, Lawton Williams (who had composed Bobby Helms' 1957 honky-tonk smash "Fraulein") wrote the lyrics while Jones came up with the melody and title. Like many other honky-tonk tunes of the 1950s, Jones sings of self-pity over a failed relationship; his lover has sent him a letter in the mail written with blue ink on blue paper, leading him to declare that "blue must be the color of the blues." Like his earlier composition "Seasons of My Heart," the song contains vivid poetic imagery, with the color blue symbolizing his despair:

There's a rainbow overhead
With more blue than gold and red
Blue must be the color angels choose
A blue dress you proudly wore
When you left to return no more
Blue must be the color of the blues

The song reached #7 on the country singles chart. It is often featured on compilations of Jones early Starday and Mercury albums, including; 1961's Greatest Hits, 2004's Definitive Collection: 1955-1962, 50 Years of Hits, and 2005's 24 Greatest Hits. Jones thought so much of the song that he would recut it for both United Artists and Musicor in the 1960s. It would also be recorded by Red Sovine, Skeeter Davis, Loretta Lynn, Elvis Costello, Patty Loveless, and John Prine featuring Susan Tedeschi.

== Chart performance ==
Chart (1958)	Peak position
U.S. Billboard Hot C&W Sides	7
