= Tell Me My Lying Eyes Are Wrong =

1970 song performed by George Jones

Single by George Jones

from the album The Best of George Jones
- B-side: "You've Become My Everything"
- Released: 1970
- Recorded: 1970
- Genre: Country
- Length: 2:27
- Label: Musicor
- Songwriter(s): Dallas Frazier, Sanger D. Shafer
- Producer(s): Pappy Daily

George Jones singles chronology
"Where Grass Won't Grow" (1970)	"Tell Me My Lying Eyes Are Wrong" (1970)	"A Good Year for the Roses" (1970)

"Tell Me My Lying Eyes Are Wrong" is a song recorded by George Jones. A "cheatin' song" written by Dallas Frazier and Sanger D. Shafer, it was released by Jones as a single on Musicor Records and peaked at No. 13 on the Billboard country music chart in 1970. Jones was becoming disenchanted with the production of his records, which were being issued at a furious pace. As Bob Allen points out in his book George Jones: The Life and Times of a Honky Tonk Legend, "During his time with Musicor, "George recorded more than over 280 songs - most of which were done in rushed, sloppily produced sessions - and help to establish for himself a somewhat unwelcome reputation as one of country music's most overrecorded artists."

== Chart performance ==
Chart (1970)	Peak position
U.S. Billboard Hot Country Singles	13
Canadian RPM Country Tracks	31

== Other ==
The song was also recorded by James Carr.
