= The Same Old Me =

Single by Ray Price

from the album Ray Price's Greatest Hits
- B-side: "Under Your Spell Again"
- Released: 1959
- Recorded: 1959
- Genre: Country
- Length: 2:40
- Label: Columbia
- Songwriter(s): Fuzzy Owen

Ray Price singles chronology
"Heartaches by the Number" (1959)	"The Same Old Me" (1959)	"One More Time" (1960)

"The Same Old Me" is a 1959 single written by Fuzzy Owen and performed by Ray Price.

== Chart performance ==
"The Same Old Me" was Ray Price's fourth #1 on the country chart spending two weeks at the top and a total of thirty weeks on the chart. The single's B-side, entitled, "Under Your Spell Again" peaked at #5 on the country chart.

== Cover versions ==
- Guy Mitchell released a cover of this song in 1960. It reached #51 on the Billboard Hot 100.
