= Right Won't Touch a Hand =

Single by George Jones

from the album First in the Hearts of Country Music Lovers
- B-side: "Someone Sweet to Love"
- Released: 1971
- Recorded: 1971
- Genre: Country
- Length: 2:11
- Label: Musicor
- Songwriter: Earl Montgomery
- Producer: Pappy Daily

George Jones singles chronology
"Sometimes You Just Can't Win" (1971)	"Right Won't Touch a Hand" (1971)	"I'll Follow You (Up to Our Cloud)" (1971)

"Right Won't Touch the Hand" is a ballad by American country singer George Jones. It was released on the Musicor label and rose to #7 on the Billboard country singles chart. It was written by Earl Montgomery. The recording, which features a lilting melody over an ambitious musical arrangement, was reminiscent of some of the material Elvis Presley was recording at the time. It would be one of the singer's last single releases on Musicor, for which he had recorded over 280 sides since 1965. Most of those records had been produced by H.W. "Pappy" Daily but, as recounted in Bob Allen's book George Jones: The Life and Times of a Honky Tonk Legend, by 1971 Jones had become unhappy with the uneven quality of his records under the supervision of Daily and Art Talmadge and, having been pried away from his longtime mentor Daily by wife Tammy Wynette, began seriously considering jumping ship to Epic Records so he could record with Wynette and her producer Billy Sherrill.
