= Where Grass Won't Grow (song) =

Single by George Jones

from the album Where Grass Won't Grow
- B-side: "Shoulder to Shoulder"
- Released: 1970
- Recorded: 1969
- Genre: Country
- Length: 3:18
- Label: Musicor
- Songwriter: Earl Montogomery
- Producer: Pappy Daily

George Jones singles chronology
"She's Mine" (1969)	"Where Grass Won't Grow" (1970)	"Tell Me My Lying Eyes Are Wrong" (1970)

"Where Grass Won't Grow" is a song by American country music singer George Jones. It was written by Earl "Peanut" Montgomery, one of Jones' favorite songwriters, and tells the story of the hardships faced by a family living on a twelve-acre farm in south Tennessee. The song features a gentle mandolin and three modulations that build to a redemptive closing but, despite a moving vocal from Jones, the single, released on Musicor in 1970, stalled at #28 on the Billboard country singles chart. He would record it again in 1994 with Emmylou Harris, Dolly Parton, and Trisha Yearwood for the Bradley Barn Sessions.

== Charts ==
Weekly chart performance for "Where Grass Won't Grow"
Chart (1970)	Peak position
US Hot Country Songs (Billboard)	28
