= Money to Burn (George Jones song) =

Single by George Jones
- B-side: "Big Harlan Taylor"
- Released: 1959
- Recorded: 1959
- Genre: Country
- Length: 2:13
- Label: Mercury
- Songwriter(s): Johnny Nelms
- Producer(s): Pappy Daily

George Jones singles chronology
""Who Shot Sam"" (1959)	"Money to Burn" (1959)	""Sparkling Brown Eyes"" (1960)

"Money to Burn" is a song written by Johnny Nelms and recorded by American country music artist George Jones. It was released on the Mercury label as the B-side to his 1959 single "Big Harlan Taylor" and became a hit, reaching #15 on the Billboard country survey. The song is similar in theme to the Joe "Red" Hayes song "A Satisfied Mind" in that it observes how worthless wealth can be without love ("A wealth of love is worth much more than all my money to burn").
