= Country Church Time =

Studio album by George Jones
- Released: January 20, 1959
- Recorded: August 1956 – September 1958
- Studio: Gold Star Recording Studio; Houston, TX; Bradley Film and Recording Studio; Nashville, TN
- Genre: Country, southern gospel
- Length: 29:00
- Label: Mercury; MG-20462
- Producer: Pappy Daily

George Jones chronology
Long Live King George (1965)	Country Church Time (1959)	White Lightning and Other Favorites (1959)

Singles from Country Church Time
- 1. "Boat of Life / Taggin' Along" Released: August 11, 1956; 2. "Cup of Loneliness / Take the Devil Out of Me" Released: October 21, 1957; 3. "Wandering Soul / Jesus Wants Me" Released: June 30, 1958

Country Church Time is the second studio album released by George Jones on January 20, 1959. The LP includes multiple early gospel recordings by Jones on Starday.

== Reception ==
Professional ratings
Review scores
Source	Rating
Allmusic	4/5 stars

Richie Unterberger of AllMusic writes that "if the lyrical scope might be more limited than his usual early efforts, sonically they're well in line with his approach as he started to reach his honky tonk prime, and anyone who likes late-'50s Jones should enjoy the plaintive performances here."

== Track listing ==
Side One
No.	Title	Writer(s)	Length
1.	"Taggin' Along"	George Jones, Burl Stephen	2:50
2.	"The Good Ole Bible"	Jones, Burl Stephen	2:19
3.	"Will the Circle Be Unbroken?"	Ada R. Habershon, Charles H. Gabriel	2:25
4.	"My Lord Has Called Me"	Jones, Lester Weytek	2:34
5.	"Take the Devil Out of Me"	Jones	2:44
6.	"Boat of Life"	Jones, Burl Stephen	2:06

Side Two
No.	Title	Writer(s)	Length
1.	"Jesus Wants Me"	Jones, Eddie Noack	2:01
2.	"Wandering Soul"	Jones, Bill Dudley	2:28
3.	"We'll Understand It" "(Farther Along)"	Traditional, William York	2:32
4.	"Cup of Loneliness"	Jones, Burl Stephen	2:24
5.	"If You Want to Wear a Crown"	Eddie Noack, Marvin Rumley	2:08
6.	"My Soul's Been Satisfied"	Jones	2:29
