= I've Got Five Dollars and It's Saturday Night =

Single by George Jones & Gene Pitney

from the album George Jones & Gene Pitney – For the First Time! Two Great Stars
- B-side: "Wreck on the Highway"
- Released: 1965
- Recorded: 1965
- Studio: Columbia Recording Studio, Nashville, Tennessee
- Genre: Country
- Length: 2:13
- Label: Musicor
- Songwriter: Ted Daffin
- Producer: Pappy Daily

George Jones & Gene Pitney singles chronology
"I've Got Five Dollars and It's Saturday Night" (1965)	"Louisiana Man" (1965)

"I've Got Five Dollars and It's Saturday Night" is a song written by Ted Daffan and recorded by his band, Ted Daffan and His Texans in 1950. Faron Young recorded a version in 1956 that hit No. 4 on the Billboard country charts. George Jones released a version on his 1960 album, The Crown Prince of Country Music.

The song is perhaps best known by a version that Jones recorded as a duet with pop singer Gene Pitney in 1965. When Jones signed with Musicor after leaving United Artists in 1965, he was paired with Pitney, who was also signed to Musicor, and they recorded two LPs' worth of duets, but "I've Got Five Dollars and It's Saturday Night" was their biggest hit, peaking at #16.

The song notably influenced the song "A Hundred Dollars" by Marshall Crenshaw on his album Mary Jean & 9 Others. Crenshaw explained, "I figured, 'Hmm, $5 in 1954, you'd need $100 in 1987 to do the same thing you could do with $5 in the earlier song.'"

Note that this is a different song than the song titled "I've Got Five Dollars" written by Richard Rodgers and Lorenz Hart.
