= Accidentally on Purpose (song) =

Single by George Jones

from the album The Fabulous Country Music Sound of George Jones
- A-side: "Sparkling Brown Eyes"
- Released: 1960
- Genre: Country
- Length: 2:01
- Label: Mercury
- Songwriters: George Jones, Darrell Edwards
- Producer: Pappy Daily

George Jones singles chronology
"Big Harlan Taylor" (1959)	"Accidentally on Purpose" (1960)	"Have Mercy on Me" (1960)

"Accidentally on Purpose" is a ballad by George Jones. It was composed by Jones and Darrell Edwards and released it as the B-side to "Sparkling Brown Eyes" on Mercury Records in 1960. In the song, the narrator accuses a former lover of marrying another man just to spite him. The song made the top 20, peaking at No. 16 on the Billboard country singles chart. Johnny Cash recorded the song in 1962 for his LP The Sound of Johnny Cash.

== Chart performance ==
Chart (1960)	Peak position
U.S. Billboard Hot Country Singles	16
