= The Race Is On =

1964 song by Don Rollins

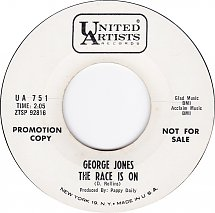
- Promo copy vinyl

Single by George Jones

from the album I Get Lonely in a Hurry and The Race Is On
- B-side: "She's Lonesome Again"
- Released: September 26, 1964
- Genre: Country
- Length: 2:05
- Label: United Artists
- Songwriter: Don Rollins
- Producer: Pappy Daily

George Jones singles chronology
"Where Does a Little Tear Come From" (1964)	"The Race Is On" (1964)	"Least of All" (1965)

"The Race Is On"

Single by Jack Jones
- B-side: "I Can't Believe I'm Losing You"
- Released: 1965
- Recorded: 1964
- Genre: Easy listening
- Length: 1:46
- Label: Kapp 651
- Songwriter: Don Rollins
- Producer: Michael Kapp

Jack Jones singles chronology
"Dear Heart" (1964)	"The Race Is On" (1965)	"Seein' the Right Love Go Wrong" (1965)

"The Race Is On"

Single by Dave Edmunds

from the album Twangin...
- B-side: "Singin' the Blues"
- Released: 1981
- Recorded: 1981
- Genre: Rock
- Length: 2:04
- Label: Swan Song
- Songwriter: Don Rollins
- Producer: Dave Edmunds

Dave Edmunds singles chronology
"Almost Saturday Night" (1981)	"The Race Is On" (1981)	"From Small Things (Big Things One Day Come)" (1983)

"The Race Is On"

Single by Sawyer Brown

from the album The Boys Are Back
- Released: September 2, 1989
- Recorded: 1989
- Genre: Country, rock, pop, country rock
- Label: Capitol/Curb
- Songwriter: Don Rollins
- Producers: Mark Miller; Randy Scruggs

Sawyer Brown singles chronology
"Old Pair of Shoes" (1989)	"The Race Is On" (1989)	"Did It for Love" (1990)

"The Race Is On" is a song written by Don Rollins (not to be confused with the Don Rollins who co-wrote "It's Five O'Clock Somewhere" for Alan Jackson and Jimmy Buffett) and made a hit on the country music charts by George Jones and on the pop and easy listening charts by the unrelated Jack Jones. George Jones's version was the first single released from his 1965 album of the same name. Released as a single in September 1964, it peaked at number three on the Billboard Hot Country Singles chart and at number 96 on the Billboard Hot 100 in January 1965. Jack Jones's version topped Billboard's Easy Listening chart and reached number 15 on the Hot 100 the same year. The two recordings combined to reach number 12 on the Cashbox charts, which combined all covers of the same song in one listing and thus gave George Jones his only top-40 hit. The song uses thoroughbred horse racing as the metaphor for the singer's romantic relationships.

== George Jones version ==
Jones had recorded "The Race Is On" in June 1963 but it was not released until September 1964 on the album I Get Lonely in a Hurry. The single reached #3 on the Billboard country chart. It also climbed to number 96 on the pop charts, a rarity for a Jones single, and United Artists capitalized on its success by making it the title of his next 1965 LP. According to the Bob Allen book George Jones: The Life and Times of a Honky Tonk Legend, Don Rollins wrote the song one day after visiting Turf Paradise Race Course in Phoenix, Arizona. Allen observes:

George imbued 'The Race Is On' with a masterfully frenetic, on-the-edge vocal reading, full of whining emotional ambivalence and mock sadness. By gleefully bending and stretching the notes and singing, at times, slightly ahead of or behind the song's fast-clipped meter, he embellished it with a subtle sense of tension and release that perfectly complemented the rapid-fire cascading effect of the song's lyrics.

In the 1994 retrospective Golden Hits, Jones recalled that Dewey Groom first played him the song in his office at the Longhorn Ballroom in Dallas. Jones was unimpressed with all the demo tapes Groom played for him and had started to leave when Groom played the Rollins song; Jones heard the opening line and exclaimed, "I'll take it!" The singer on that 1961 demo recording was Jimmie Gray, for whom Don Rollins wrote the song. Gray's version is one whole step higher than Jones' version, and prompted George to seek him out. The two became friends, Jimmie eventually roading in George's band, on bass and high harmony, and Jimmie was in the studio when George cut his hit. According to the liner notes for the 1994 Sony compilation The Essential George Jones: The Spirit of Country, the throbbing, echoey six-string bass guitar solo was played by Kelso Herston, who went on to write hit songs for Jones and produce one of his later MCA albums. Jones was extremely fond of the tune, recording it again with Musicor, Epic, and as a duet with Travis Tritt for The Bradley Barn Sessions in 1994. He almost always performed it live in concert as well.

== Dave Edmunds and the Stray Cats version ==
Rockabilly artist Dave Edmunds, in collaboration with the Stray Cats, whose debut album Edmunds had recently produced, recorded a version for his 1981 album, Twangin.... Stray Cats drummer Slim Jim Phantom recalled Edmunds' affection for the song when he was courting the band to produce their debut album: "We met with Edmunds at his house. He had a little pub in his basement. He had a finished basement, outside of London. Edmunds had a jukebox, a little jukebox. He had 'The Race is On' and 'Rockabilly Boogie' by Johnny Burnette. He had those records in his jukebox. We all looked at each other and said, 'This is it.'" Phantom also recalled that the song took "one or two takes" in the studio.

Released as a single, it peaked at number 34 on the UK charts, but failed to chart in the United States. The single's release was accompanied by a music video, which Edmunds and the Stray Cats filmed in Eden Studios during the recording of Cats' first album.

== Other recordings ==
- Jack Jones released a pop/easy listening version of the song. It reached #15 on the Billboard Hot 100 and spent a week atop the Billboard easy listening chart in April 1965.
- Loretta Lynn cut the song in March of 1965 for her album Blue Kentucky Girl, released in June of that year on the Decca label.
- Alvin and the Chipmunks covered the song for their 1965 album Chipmunks à Go-Go in 1965.
- Country Singer Jody Miller covered the song prior to late 1965. In a 1965 episode of The Jimmy Dean Show, including guests Forrest Tucker, Mollie Bee, and Homer & Jethro, Jody, after singing the song, believed it to be "her song". She was completely unaware that George Jones had already had a hit with it and that others had covered it. Miller recorded a Scopitone promotional video for her version of the song.
- Waylon Jennings cut the song for A&M.
- Faron Young recorded his own version of the song for Mercury Records.
- The Grateful Dead covered the song 59 times in concert from 1969 to 1995. It appears in several of their live releases, such as in Reckoning, Here Comes Sunshine 1973, Winterland 1973: The Complete Recordings, and the Dave's Picks album series in Volume 5, Volume 16, Volume 32, and Volume 54.
- The Georgia Satellites covered the song on their 1985 debut EP, Keep The Faith.
- "The Race Is On" returned to the country charts in September 1989 when country music band Sawyer Brown covered it and released it as the lead single from their album The Boys Are Back. It peaked at number five in the United States and number three in Canada. It was ranked number 5 in the Canadian year-end country charts. The music video was directed by John Lloyd Miller and features Sawyer Brown on their concert tour.
- Charley Crockett performed a cover of the song on his album Lil G.L.'s Blue Bonanza.

== Chart positions ==
=== George Jones version ===
Chart (1964–1965)	Peak position
US Hot Country Songs (Billboard)	3
US Billboard Hot 100	96

=== Jack Jones version ===
Chart (1965)	Peak position
US Billboard Hot 100	15
U.S. Billboard Middle-Road Singles	1
Canada (RPM) Top Singles	12
Canada (RPM) Top AC	8

=== Dave Edmunds version ===
Chart (1981)	Peak position
UK Singles Chart	3

=== Sawyer Brown version ===
Chart (1989)	Peak position
US Hot Country Songs (Billboard)	5
Canadian RPM Country Tracks	3

== See also ==
- List of number-one adult contemporary singles of 1965 (U.S.)
