= If Not for You (George Jones song) =

Single by George Jones

from the album Where Grass Won't Grow
- B-side: "When the Wife Runs Off"
- Released: 1969
- Recorded: 1969
- Genre: Country
- Length: 3:04
- Label: Musicor
- Songwriter(s): Jerry Chesnut
- Producer(s): Pappy Daily

George Jones singles chronology
"I'll Share My World with You" (1969)	"If Not for You" (1969)	"She's Mine" (1969)

"If Not for You" is a song written by Jerry Chesnut and recorded by American country singer George Jones. It was released as a single on the Musicor label and reached No. 6 on the Billboard country singles chart in 1969. Like many of his biggest hits of the period, it is a love ballad. The song extols the virtues of a supportive lover. Chestnut also composed the Jones hit "A Good Year for the Roses".

== Chart performance ==
Chart (1969)	Peak position
U.S. Billboard Hot Country Singles	6
Canadian RPM Country Tracks	16
