= Her Name Is =

Single by George Jones

from the album Alone Again
- B-side: "Diary of My Mind"
- Released: 1976
- Recorded: 1976
- Genre: Country
- Length: 2:17
- Label: Epic
- Songwriter(s): Bobby Braddock
- Producer(s): Billy Sherrill

George Jones singles chronology
"You Always Look Your (Best Here in My Arms)" (1976)	"Her Name Is" (1976)	"Old King Kong" (1977)

"Her Name Is" is a country song written by Bobby Braddock and made famous by George Jones. It reached No. 3 on the Hot Country Songs in 1976.

== Content ==
The song's electric clavinet solo was played by Nashville session musician Hargus "Pig" Robbins. Part of the song's success may have been that fans assumed George was singing about ex-wife Tammy Wynette; indeed, in the liner notes to the Jones retrospective Anniversary – 10 Years of Hits, producer Billy Sherrill confirms that song was "about Tammy." In his 1995 memoir, Jones wryly remarked, "The public believed I was singing about Tammy. Several reporters asked if that were true. I purposely hedged on the question. I was ready to let people think whatever they wanted to think if it might sell a few records. I needed the money to pay child support to Tammy."

== Chart performance ==
Chart (1976)	Peak position
U.S. Billboard Hot Country Singles	3
Canadian RPM Country Tracks	3
