= I Get Lonely in a Hurry =

Studio album by George Jones
- Released: November 1964
- Recorded: August 1964
- Studio: Columbia (Nashville, Tennessee)
- Genre: Country
- Length: 28:52
- Label: United Artists
- Producer: Pappy Daily

George Jones chronology
George Jones Sings Like the Dickens! (1964)	I Get Lonely in a Hurry (1964)	The Race Is On (1965)

Professional ratings
Review scores
Source	Rating
Record Mirror	3/5 stars

I Get Lonely in a Hurry is an album by George Jones, released on United Artists Records in 1964.

== Reception ==
AllMusic calls Jones performance on "Book of Memories" "haunting".

== Chart performance ==
I Get Lonely in a Hurry debuted on the Billboard Top Country Albums chart in the issue dated November 28, 1964, peaking at number 10 during an eighteen-week run on it.

== Track listing ==
No.	Title	Writer(s)	Length
1.	"I Get Lonely in a Hurry"	George Jones, "Country" Johnny Mathis, Virginia Franks	2:27
2.	"Book of Memories"	Bobby Austin	2:45
3.	"I'm Gonna Change Everything"	Alex Zanetis	2:22
4.	"The Race is On"	Don Rollins	2:07
5.	"Least of All"	Sonny James, Carole Smith	2:34
6.	"Gonna Have a Little Talk with You"	Oney Wheeler	2:12
7.	"I've Been Known to Cry"	Eddie Hallowell	2:19
8.	"Love's Gonna Live Here"	Buck Owens	2:15
9.	"Gold and Silver"	Shirley Legate	2:30
10.	"Holiday for Love"	Mel Tillis, Webb Pierce, Wayne P. Walker	2:00
11.	"She's Mine"	George Jones, Jack Ripley	2:41
12.	"Where Does a Little Tear Come From"	Marge Barton, Johnny MacRae	2:35

== Charts ==
Chart (1973)	Peak position
US Top Country Albums (Billboard)	10

== Charting Singles ==
Single	Chart	Peak position
Where Does a Little Tear Come From	U.S. Billboard Hot Country Singles	10
The Race is On	U.S. Billboard Hot Country Singles	5
Least of All	U.S. Billboard Hot Country Singles	15
