= Treasure of Love (George Jones song) =

Single by George Jones
- B-side: "If I Don't Love You (Grits Ain't Groceries)"
- Released: Oct. 1958
- Recorded: 1958
- Genre: Country
- Length: 2:18
- Label: Mercury
- Songwriter(s): George Jones, J. P. Richardson
- Producer(s): Pappy Daily

George Jones singles chronology
"I'm With the Wrong One" (1958)	"Treasure of Love" (1958)	"White Lightning" (1959)

"Treasure of Love" is a song by George Jones. It was released as a single on Mercury Records and reached No. 6 on the US country chart in 1958.

== Background ==
Jones composed "Treasure of Love" with J. P. Richardson, better known as the Big Bopper, who also wrote Jones' first No. 1 country hit "White Lightning." Jones biographer Bob Allen describes Jones' "languid, drawling" singing as "more reminiscent of the diphthong-twisting style of Oklahoma honky-tonk king Hank Thompson than anything he'd ever recorded." The single's B-side, "If I Don't Love You (Grits Ain't Groceries)," became a minor hit, peaking at No. 29 on the charts.
