= Alone Again (album) =

Studio album by George Jones
- Released: 1976
- Recorded: 1976
- Studio: Columbia (Nashville, Tennessee)
- Genre: Country
- Label: Epic
- Producer: Billy Sherrill

George Jones chronology
The Battle (1976)	Alone Again (1976)	I Wanta Sing (1977)

Singles from Alone Again
- 1. "Her Name Is" Released: August 1976

Professional ratings
Review scores
Source	Rating
Allmusic	4/5 stars
Christgau's Record Guide	A−

Alone Again is an album by American country music singer George Jones. It was released in 1976 via Epic Records. The album includes the single "Her Name Is". It is Jones’ 53rd Album Release.

== Track listing ==
1. "A Drunk Can't Be a Man" (George Jones, Earl Montgomery)
2. "Ain't Nobody Gonna Miss Me" (Jones, Montgomery)
3. "Stand on My Own Two Knees" (Jan Crutchfield, Roger Bowling)
4. "You're the Best Living" (Jody Emerson)
5. "Over Something Good" (Emerson)
6. "Her Name Is" (Bobby Braddock)
7. "I'm All She's Got" (Emerson)
8. "She Needs Me" (Montgomery, Emerson)
9. "Right Now I'd Come Back and Melt in Her Arms" (Emerson)
10. "Diary of My Mind" (Sadie M. Starks, John Starks)
