= Wrong Number (George Jones song) =

1965 song by George Jones

Promotional single by George Jones

from the album George Jones Sings More New Favorites
- B-side: "The Old, Old House"
- Released: April 1965
- Recorded: 1965
- Genre: Country
- Length: 2:35
- Label: United Artists
- Songwriters: George Jones, Dickie Overby
- Producer: Pappy Daily

"Wrong Number" is a song by American country singer George Jones. Jones composed the song with Dickie Overby. It was released as a promotional single in 1965 and rose to #14 on the Billboard Hot Country Singles chart. The song tells the story of a man who, filled with despair, calls his former lover on the telephone because he wants to hear her voice again. However, he dares not speak: "I bite my lip till the blood runs free and keep the words 'I love you' hidden deep, deep inside of me..." The woman assumes it is a wrong number and hangs up.
