= Out of Control (George Jones song) =

Single by George Jones
- A-side: "Just Little Boy Blue"
- Released: June 1960
- Genre: Country
- Length: 2:38
- Label: Mercury
- Songwriters: George Jones, Darrell Edwards, Herbie Treece
- Producer: Pappy Daily

George Jones singles chronology
"Have Mercy on Me" (1960)	"Out of Control" (1960)	"The Window Up Above" (1960)

"Out of Control" is a song by George Jones. It was released as a single on Mercury Records in 1960.

== Background ==
"Out of Control" is one of Jones' most gripping songs about alcoholism. Written by the singer along with Darrell Edwards and Herbie Treece, its evocative lyrics paint a dismal portrait of a man drinking himself into oblivion, with the narrator identifying himself as "just like that fellow." Like his earlier hit "Just One More", the song is an early example of the sad, cry-in-your-beer honky-tonk lament that Jones would become famous for, but "Out of Control" explores the theme with far more nuance:

He sits down at a table
With his hands on a glass
For him there's no future
There's only the past
He reaches for the bottle
But his hands don't take hold
His eyes just can't focus
He's out of control.

Supported by a subtle steel guitar and barroom piano, the character's condition in the song continues to deteriorate, with Jones singing with an almost detached kind of sincerity:

He shakes and he trembles
Even though he's not old
Like a leaf in a whirlwind
He's out of control.

As the decade progressed, Jones would move further away from the high lonesome, Hank Williams-influenced singing style that characterized many of his Starday and early Mercury recordings and begin exploring the lower registers of his voice. He would also adopt a more idiosyncratic singing style reminiscent of fellow Texas honky-tonk legend Lefty Frizzell. "Out of Control" laid the foundation for this new vocal approach. As Rich Kienzle notes in the 1994 Sony retrospective The Essential George Jones: The Spirit of Country, "He changed the volume of his voice or swooped from a deep bass to a high treble to accentuate a phrase or lyric. At times he'd stiffen his jaw or sing through clenched teeth to emphasize a point."

== Chart performance ==
Single	Chart	Peak position
Out of Control	U.S. Billboard Hot Country Singles	25
