= Window Shopping (song) =

Single by Hank Williams With His Drifting Cowboys

from the album Honky Tonkin'
- A-side: "Jambalaya (On the Bayou)"
- Released: July 19, 1952
- Recorded: June 13, 1952
- Studio: Castle Studio, Nashville
- Genre: Country & Western, Honky-tonk, Country blues
- Length: 2:32
- Label: MGM K 11283
- Songwriter: Marcel Joseph

Hank Williams With His Drifting Cowboys singles chronology
"Half as Much" (1952)	"Window Shopping" (1952)	"Settin' the Woods on Fire" (1952)

"Window Shopping" is a song written by Marcel Joseph and popularized by country singer Hank Williams, who released the song in July 1952 on MGM Records. Joseph was a French Jew who settled in New York City in 1914 and grew to love country music, working as an illustrator at the Journal American by day and writing songs in his spare time.

The song was chosen to be the B-side to "Jambalaya (On the Bayou)," one of Williams' biggest hits. He recorded it on June 13, 1952, his first recording session in six months, at Castle Studio in Nashville with backing provided by Jerry Rivers (fiddle), Don Helms (steel guitar), Chet Atkins (lead guitar), Chuck Wright (bass) and probably Ernie Newton (bass).

== Cover versions ==
- Band leader Art Mooney recorded the song on July 21, 1952.
- George Jones cut the song for Mercury in 1960.
- Hank Williams Jr. recorded the song as an overdubbed duet with his father in 1965 for MGM.
- Ernest Tubb recorded the song for Decca in 1968.
- Dwight Yoakam performed the song in the documentary In the Hank Williams Tradition.
