= Where Grass Won't Grow =

Studio album by George Jones
- Released: November 1969
- Recorded: 1968 – 1969
- Genre: Country
- Length: 23:55
- Label: Musicor

George Jones chronology
I'll Share My World with You (1969)	Where Grass Won't Grow (1969)	Will You Visit Me on Sunday? (1970)

Singles from Where Grass Won't Grow
- 1. "If Not for You" Released: July 24, 1969; 2. "She's Mine" Released: October 28, 1969; 3. "Where Grass Won't Grow" Released: January 5, 1970

Professional ratings
Review scores
Source	Rating
Allmusic	2/5 stars

Where Grass Won't Grow is an album by American country music artist George Jones released in 1969 (see 1969 in country music) on Musicor Records MS 3181.

== Track listing ==
No.	Title	Writer(s)	Length
1.	"Where Grass Won't Grow"	Earl Montgomery	3:12
2.	"For Better or for Worse"	Eddie Miller, Eddie Noack	2:18
3.	"If Not for You"	Jerry Chesnut	2:58
4.	"Until I Remember You're Gone"	Dallas Frazier	2:24
5.	"Barbara Joy"	Noack	2:18
6.	"No Blues Is Good News"	Noack	2:26
7.	"Same Old Boat (Third Time Down)"	Jack Wallace/Benny Barnes	2:09
8.	"Old Blue Tomorrow"	Darrell Edwards	2:15
9.	"Shoulder to Shoulder"	Frazier	2:20
10.	"She's Mine"	George Jones, Jack Ripley	2:55

== Chart Performance ==
=== Weekly charts ===
Chart (1969–1970)	Peak position
US Top Country Albums (Billboard)	15

=== Year-end charts ===
Chart (1970)	Position
US Top Country Albums (Billboard)	43

=== Singles ===
Year	Single	Peak chart positions	
Year	Single	US Country	CAN Country
1969	It's Not For You	6	16
1969	She's Mine	6	33
1970	Where Grass Won't Grow	28	31
