= George Jones Sings White Lightning and Other Favorites =

White Lightning and Other Favorites

Studio album by George Jones
- Released: May 26, 1959
- Recorded: August 1956 – September 1958
- Studio: Gold Star Recording Studio; Houston, Tex.; Bradley Film and Recording Studio; Nashville, Tenn.
- Genre: Country, rockabilly
- Length: 28:58
- Label: Mercury; MG-20477
- Producer: Pappy Daily

George Jones chronology
Country Church Time (1959)	White Lightning and Other Favorites (1959)	The Crown Prince of Country Music (1960)

Singles from White Lightning and Other Favorites
- 1. "I'm With the Wrong One" Released: July 23, 1958; 2. "Wandering Soul" Released: July 30, 1958; 3. "White Lightning" Released: February 9, 1959

White Lightning and Other Favorites is the third studio album released by George Jones on May 26, 1959. Its title track "White Lightning" was a #1 Country hit in 1959.

The album is one of the most favorably regarded albums that Jones released in the 1950s. The album charted well, and was one of the most popular country albums of 1959. It also contained some of Jones' first collaborations. "I'm With the Wrong One" was his second collaboration, recorded in 1956 (the oldest song included on the LP) as a duet with Jennette Hicks. "Flame in My Heart" was his third collaboration, recorded as a duet with Virginia Spurlock and released as a single in 1957. "Wandering Soul" and "Jesus Wants Me" had been previously released on his January 1959 album Country Church Time.

== Track listing ==
Side one
No.	Title	Writer(s)	Length
1.	"White Lightning"	J.P Richardson	2:49
2.	"I'm With the Wrong One (w/ Jennette Hicks)"	George Jones	2:12
3.	"That's the Way I Feel"	George Jones, Roger Miller	1:55
4.	"Life to Go"	Jones	2:55
5.	"Don't Do This to Me"	Jones	2:17
6.	"Wandering Soul"	Bill Dudley, Jones	2:26

Side two
No.	Title	Writer(s)	Length
1.	"Giveaway Girl"	Jones, Sid Kessel	2:24
2.	"You're Back Again"	Jones, Hank Locklin	2:47
3.	"No Use to Cry"	Jones	2:14
4.	"Nothing Can Stop Me"	Miller, Jones	2:30
5.	"Flame in My Heart (w/ Virginia Spurlock)"	Jones, Bernard Spurlock	2:30
6.	"Jesus Wants Me"	Jones, Eddie Noack	1:59

== Reception ==
Professional ratings
Review scores
Source	Rating
AllMusic	4.5/5 stars

"White Lightning" is one of Jones' biggest number-one hits. He performed it live throughout his career (as it was a big fan favorite) and re-recorded it multiple times. The album it produced was arguably the best of Jones' LP releases during his early career.
