= Sometimes You Just Can't Win =

Single by George Jones

from the album First in the Hearts of Country Music Lovers
- B-side: "Brothers of a Bottle"
- Released: 1971
- Recorded: 1971
- Genre: Country
- Length: 2:25
- Label: Musicor
- Songwriter: Smokey Stover
- Producer: Pappy Daily

George Jones singles chronology
"A Good Year for the Roses" (1970)	"Sometimes You Just Can't Win" (1971)	"Right Won't Touch a Hand" (1971)

"Sometimes You Just Can't Win" is a song by American country singer George Jones. It was written by Smokey Stover.

== Background ==
Jones had recorded "Sometimes You Just Can't Win" during his time with United Artists; that version, which appeared as the B-side of his 1962 smash "She Thinks I Still Care," had been a minor hit, reaching #17 on the country singles chart. Couched in piano, tremolo guitar, and a bevy of background singers, it features a gentler, slightly sweeter delivery compared to the almost gothic vocal performance found on the 1971 Musicor version. By the early seventies, Jones was a much more nuanced singer than he had been a decade earlier, and "Sometimes You Just Can't Win," which rose to #10 on the charts, was a prime example of how his singing could be, at times, frightening in its intensity. The song, a suicidal lament about unrequited love, begins softly with gently picked mandolin:

Just when the sun shines the brightest
and the world looks all right again

An ensemble of strings and background singers begins a crescendo:

Then the clouds fill the skies
You can't believe your eyes
Sometimes you just can't win

The narrator's inner turmoil - being hopelessly in love with a woman who only considers him a friend - drives him to despair that turns into corrosive resentment:

My love never meant much to you, dear
For to you I was always a friend
Why did I fall? You have no heart at all
Sometime you just can't win

Making these performances all the more remarkable is the offhand manner in which many of his sides at Musicor were recorded. In his 1995 autobiography, Jones admitted to usually being loaded at his recording sessions, with many of the vocals laid down in one take. "I'd go through one take," he wrote, "Pappy Daily [his producer] would play back what I had done, and then he'd usually holler, 'Ship it.'" Jones had recorded 2 different versions of the song as said earlier, one in 1962 that was the b-side of his number 1 hit "She Thinks I Still Care" and again in 1971 that can be found on his RCA Victor album "First In The Hearts of Country Music Lovers".'"

== Cover versions ==
- The Osborne Brothers on Country Roads (1971)
- Linda Ronstadt on Get Closer (1982)
- The Chapmans on Simple Man (2005)

== Bibliography ==
- Jones, George; Carter, Tom (1996). I Lived to Tell it All. Villard. ISBN 978-0679438694.
