= Lou Smith =

American singer-songwriter

- Birth name: Louis Smith
- Born: 9 March 1928; Joaquin, Texas
- Died: 21 October 2007 (aged 79)
- Genres: Country
- Occupation: Singer
- Instrument: Guitar
- Years active: 1960–1961
- Labels: KRCO, Salvo

Louis Smith (9 March 1928 – 21 October 2007) was a country and western singer who recorded for Top Talent Records at once, and reportedly had gotten started in the music industry when the nephew of Tex Ritter, Ken Ritter, heard him perform at a local honky tonk.

Lou played in many of the local Southeast Texas clubs and honky tonks. At one point country legend George Jones sang backup for Lou during Jones' early teens when he was just beginning his career. His notable songs include "My Name is Lou", "I'll Be the One", "Born to Be Lonely", "Always a Winner", and "Close to My Heart".

== Singles ==
Year	Single	US Country
1960	"Cruel Love"	9
1961	"I'm Wondering"	21
