= You Comb Her Hair =

Single by George Jones

from the album George Jones Sings More New Favorites
- B-side: "Funny What a Fool Will Do"
- Released: 1963
- Recorded: 1963
- Genre: Country
- Length: 2:41
- Label: United Artists
- Songwriters: Hank Cochran, Harlan Howard
- Producer: Pappy Daily

George Jones singles chronology
"Not What I Had in Mind" (1963)	"You Comb Her Hair" (1963)	"Your Heart Turned Left (And I Was on the Right)" (1964)

"You Comb Her Hair" is a song by George Jones and Melba Montgomery; it was written by Hank Cochran and Harlan Howard. and released as a single in 1963, reaching No.5 on the Billboard country singles chart. The song, an ode of love and devotion from a father to his daughter, was typical of Jones's releases during this period. In a 1994 article by Nick Tosches for the Texas Monthly, Jones confessed that he regarded the early sixties as his finest period, stating, "We did a lot of the pure country then."

Johnny Cash recorded the song for his 1966 album Happiness Is You.
