= Who Shot Sam =

Single by George Jones

from the album The Fabulous Country Music Sound of George Jones
- B-side: "Into My Arms Again"
- Released: 1959
- Recorded: 1959
- Studio: Bradley Studios, Nashville, Tennessee
- Genre: Rockabilly, country
- Length: 2:20
- Label: Mercury
- Songwriter(s): George Jones, Darrell Edwards, Ray Jackson
- Producer(s): Pappy Daily

George Jones singles chronology
"White Lightning" (1959)	"Who Shot Sam" (1959)	"Big Harlan Taylor" (1959)

"Who Shot Sam" is a song by George Jones. It was recorded and released as a single in 1959 by Mercury Records and reached No. 7 on the country singles chart. Jones wrote the song with Darrell Edwards, with whom he had collaborated on several occasions, and Ray Jackson. The song is very similar to "White Lightning". Like "White Lightning", "Who Shot Sam" appeared on the low rungs of the pop chart, peaking at No. 93. The song tells the story about a wild Saturday-night shoot-out in New Orleans, Louisiana.

== Charts ==
Chart	Peak	Ref
Billboard Hot Country Songs	7	
Billboard Hot 100	93	

== See also ==
- George Jones albums discography
- George Jones and Tammy Wynette discography
