= Big Harlan Taylor =

Single by George Jones

from the album The Novelty Side of George Jones
- B-side: "Money to Burn"
- Released: 1959
- Recorded: 1959
- Genre: Country
- Length: 2:01
- Label: Mercury
- Songwriter(s): Roger Miller
- Producer(s): Pappy Daily

George Jones singles chronology
"Who Shot Sam" (1959)	"Big Harlan Taylor" (1959)	"Sparkling Brown Eyes" (1960)

"Big Harlan Taylor" is a song by George Jones. It was released as a single on Mercury Records in late 1959.

== Background ==
"Big Harlan Taylor" was Jones' final single release of the 1950s, topping out at No. 19 on the Billboard country singles chart. It was written by Roger Miller. Jones and Miller crossed paths sometime in 1957, and it was Jones who introduced Miller to music executives from the Starday Records; the label executives were impressed with Miller and set up a session in Houston, Texas. According to the official Roger Miller website, Jones and Miller collaborated during the trip, writing "Tall, Tall Trees" and "Happy Child" together. Jones would also record the Miller compositions "Into My Arms Again" and, much later, the ballad "You Oughta Be Here with Me". The B-side to "Big Harlan Taylor", the Johnny Nelms-penned "Money to Burn", was also a top 20 hit on the country singles chart, climbing to No. 15.
