= She's Mine =

Single by George Jones

from the album Where Grass Won't Grow
- B-side: "No Blues Is Good News"
- Released: 1970
- Recorded: 1969
- Genre: Country
- Length: 3:02
- Label: Musicor
- Songwriter(s): George Jones, Jack Ripley
- Producer(s): Pappy Daily

George Jones singles chronology
"If Not for You" (1969)	"She's Mine" (1970)	"Where Grass Won't Grow" (1970)

"She's Mine" is a song by George Jones. It was composed by Jones and Jack Ripley.

== Background ==
The song seemingly describes the feelings of a man towards a woman, presumably his wife, who no longer loves him, but he feels "satisfied just having her around." As the song concludes, however, it has a surprise ending.

== Chart performance ==
Jones had already cut it for United Artists earlier in the decade but a new version was released as a single in 1969 on the Musicor label and rose to #6 on the Billboard country singles chart. It became yet another Top 10 hit for Jones, who had been a constant presence on the country charts throughout most of the decade.

== Charts ==
Chart (1969)	Peak position
US Billboard Hot Country Singles	6
Canadian RPM Country Tracks	33
