= White Lightning (The Big Bopper song) =

1959 single by George Jones

Single by George Jones

from the album White Lightning and Other Favorites
- B-side: "Long Time to Forget"
- Released: February 9, 1959
- Recorded: 1958
- Studio: Bradley Studios (Nashville, Tennessee)
- Genre: Rock and roll, rockabilly, country
- Length: 2:48
- Label: Mercury
- Songwriter: J. P. Richardson
- Producer: Pappy Daily

George Jones singles chronology
"Treasure of Love" (1958)	"White Lightning" (1959)	"Who Shot Sam" (1959)

"White Lightning" is a song written by J. P. Richardson, best known by his stage name, the Big Bopper. After he recorded the song himself in 1958, it was recorded by American country music artist George Jones and released as a single in February 1959. On April 13, 1959, Jones' version was the first number-one single of his career. The song has since been covered by numerous artists. Richardson never got to see the success of the record, as he had been killed in an airplane accident 6 days before its release along with Buddy Holly and Ritchie Valens.

== Recording and composition ==
Jones recorded the song at the Bradley Studios in Nashville, Tennessee. In his 1997 autobiography, I Lived To Tell It All, Jones recalls arriving for the recording session under the influence of a great deal of alcohol and the track took approximately 80 takes. To compound matters, bassist Buddy Killen was reported to have developed blisters from replaying his part dozens of times. As a result, Killen not only threatened to quit the session, but also threatened to physically harm Jones for the painful consequences of Jones' drinking. Ultimately, producer Pappy Daily opted to use the first take of the song, even though Jones flubbed the word "slug" (Jones would intentionally mimic this mistake in live performances and subsequent re-recordings of the song). Former Starday president Don Pierce later explained to Jones' biographer Bob Allen, "We tried doing the song again, but it never was as good as it was that first time. So we just released it that way."

Besides Buddy Killen, Hargus "Pig" Robbins was also a notable session participant, playing piano on the record.

"White Lightning" became Jones' first number-one country hit - with a more convincing rock and roll sound, than the half-hearted rockabilly cuts he had previously recorded. In the liner notes to the 1994 compilation Cup of Loneliness: The Classic Mercury Years, country music historian Colin Escott writes, "Ironically, it became the pop hit Mercury had been hoping for all along...George hee-hawed it up in a giddy, bilbous frenzy." The song gave Jones, a notorious critic of pop-country crossovers in his later years, the best showing he would ever achieve on Billboard magazine’s pop chart as well, peaking at No. 73.

English post-punk group The Fall covered "White Lightning" as a stand-alone single in 1991, which was later included on CD issues of the album Shift-Work. The group performed the song live over 300 times at their concerts.

== Chart performance ==
Chart (1959)	Peak position
U.S. Billboard Hot C&W Sides	1
U.S. Billboard Hot 100	73
