= Pappy Daily =

American record producer and entrepreneur

Harold W. Daily
- Also known as: Pappy Daily
- Born: February 8, 1902
- Origin: Yoakum, Texas
- Died: December 5, 1987 (aged 85)
- Genres: Country
- Occupation(s): Record producer, music publisher
- Years active: 1950s–1980s

Harold W. Daily (February 8, 1902 – December 5, 1987), better known as "Pappy" Daily, was an American country music record producer and entrepreneur who cofounded the Texas-based record label Starday Records. Daily worked with many of the well-known artists in country music during the 1950s and 1960s, especially George Jones, who looked upon him as a father figure and as a business advisor. Other artists with whom Daily worked include Melba Montgomery (signed by Daily following a recommendation by Jones), J. P. Richardson (the Big Bopper), and Roger Miller.

== Early life ==
Daily was born in Yoakum, Texas at the beginning of the 20th century. His mother remarried soon after Daily's father died when Daily was a child and the family relocated to Houston. After his military service, Daily was involved in many different lines of business, including working on the railroads and the amusement-machine business. Later, he started his own venture distributing jukeboxes, and during this period, he discovered his appreciation of country records from listening to the early hits being played on his own machines. During World War II, he opened his first record outlet in Houston.

He entered the country music scene in the early 1930s, although he had no previous professional background in music and was not an accomplished musician or singer himself. His business acumen and his ability to nourish talent in others were his strong points. Daily did not rise to prominence, though, until helping found Starday in 1953.

== A career in the music business ==
Daily founded Starday Records with Jack Starnes and grew into one of the most successful independent labels from Texas in the 1950s. In the mid-1950s, when Starday signed up George Jones, Daily became a figure in country music. Together with Don Pierce (who bought out Starnes at Starday), Daily worked extensively with George Jones to further Jones' career until they came to the attention of Mercury Records, which wanted Jones and the Daily/Pierce partnership. Daily's agreement with Mercury allowed him to continue with his Starday venture and other independent labels, licensing any promising records back to Mercury for the larger label to market and distribute. As a record producer at Mercury, he worked on a succession of hits for Jones. Jones later asserted that the Nashville studio musicians and he did most of the actual production work on his recordings and that Daily, with whom Jones eventually fell out, primarily made sure the session paperwork was in order.

In 1961, Daily and Pierce ended their partnership and at the end of 1961, Daily left Starday and Mercury to go to United Artists, becoming their country and western director. Jones, who had followed his mentor to United Artists, had more big hits working with Daily, but Daily failed to progress anyone else's career to the same extent as he did with George Jones.

Daily also founded the Musicor Records label in the 1960s with Art Talmadge, and George Jones was their biggest name.

Daily also founded a label with the unusual one-letter name "D" Records focusing on Texas acts, but none of them matched his previous success. In 1965, he closed D Records and left United Artists to concentrate his efforts on Musicor, signing artists of the calibre of Gene Pitney. George Jones and Gene Pitney were by far the biggest names on the Musicor label, so by the time the 1970s arrived, with Pitney no longer making records and Jones moving on to Epic Records, Musicor was left without any big names enough to make the label viable.

In 1967, on the recommendation of Kitty Wells and Roger Miller, Daily teamed young guitarist Zane Ashton (aka Bill Aken) with United Artist country singer Kathy Dee, who had just hit "Don't Leave Me Lonely Too Long". Ashton was to produce Kathy's following three records. Elvis used to call Ashton "the Fixer" due to his ability to fix a mediocre soundtrack with his guitar work. The soundtracks the young guitarist produced for Progressive Sounds of America were four of the most innovative of the period. These productions, along with those done for Ray Price and Eddy Arnold, helped usher in the use of big string sections on country music records. Cliffie Stone of Capitol Records said, "The wall has been breached and soon violins in country music will be an everyday thing". Sadly, Kathy Dee had a stroke and never finished the recordings. By the mid-1970s, Daily had quit producing records to concentrate on his music-publishing company, with Musicor fading from the scene.

Pappy Daily also owned Big State Distributors in Dallas, Texas, the wholesale distributor of over 100 independent labels, including Atlantic, London, Roulette, A&M, Scepter, Deram, Rolling Stone, and the entire Motown group (Motown, Tamala, Gordy) with artists such as The Supremes, Diana Ross, The Jackson 5, Michael Jackson, and Marvin Gaye. The company had five salesmen.

Pappy Daily died December 5, 1987, in Houston and is buried in the city. His sons and grandson are still active in the music business.
