= George Jones albums discography =

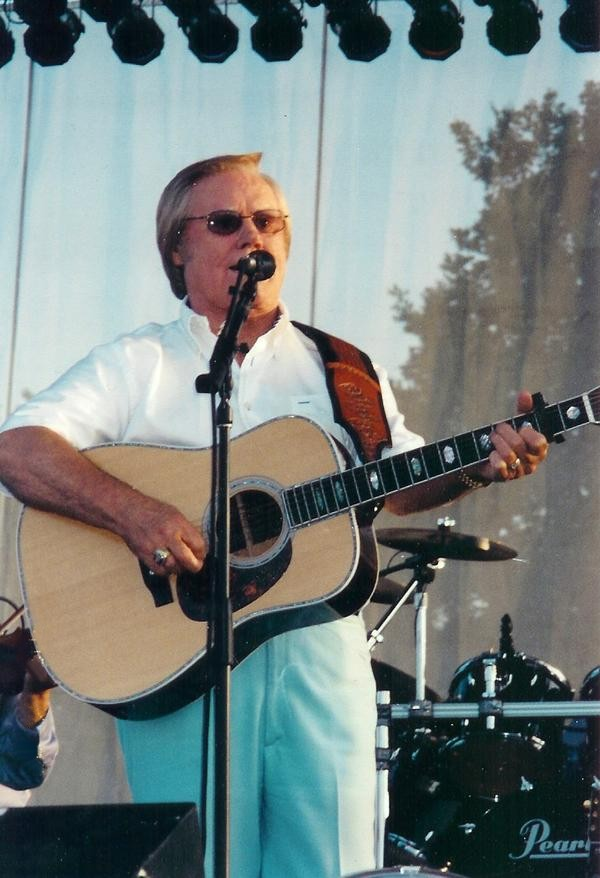
- Jones performing at Harrah's Metropolis in Metropolis, Illinois in June 2002
- Studio albums: 80
- Live albums: 3
- Compilation albums: 132
- Video albums: 10
- Solo studio albums: 69
- Collaborative studio albums: 11
- Box sets: 7

The albums discography of American country artist George Jones contains 80 studio albums, 132 compilation albums, three live albums, ten video albums and seven box sets. Of his studio albums, 69 are solo releases while 11 are collaborative releases (not counting his music with Tammy Wynette). In 1956, Jones's debut studio LP was issued on Starday Records titled, Grand Ole Opry's New Star. The label only issued one studio effort, but would release a series of compilation. On Mercury Records, Jones released six studio LP's including Country Church Time (1959) and George Jones Salutes Hank Williams (1960). He switched to the United Artists label in 1962, where he released 13 studio LP's. Among these was a collaborative LP with Melba Montgomery called Singing What's in Our Heart (1963), which was his first to chart the Billboard Top Country Albums survey. He moved to Musicor in 1965. Among the label's studio LP's was I'm a People (1966), which reached the top of the Billboard country survey. Musicor also issued his first collaborative studio album with Gene Pitney, which made the Billboard country LP's chart and the Billboard 200.

The Musicor label issued a series of compilations during the sixties and seventies, including five which charted on Billboard. Jones moved to Epic Records in 1972. The label released 11 studio albums by Jones in the seventies. His highest-charting was A Picture of Me (Without You) (1973), which reached number three on the Billboard country albums survey. I Am What I Am (1980) reached the country albums top ten and the Billboard 200. It also became his first disc to certify platinum in the United States, for selling over million copies. Among his eighties albums, Still the Same Ole Me (1981), Shine On (1983), Who's Gonna Fill Their Shoes (1984) and Wine Colored Roses (1986), all made the Billboard country top ten. Still the Same Ole Me and Wine Colored Roses both certified gold in the United States for selling 500,000 copies each. Epic released a series of compilations during the eighties. Among them was Super Hits, which sold two million copies in the United States. Jones also collaborated on studio discs with Johnny Paycheck and Merle Haggard respectively during the eighties. He remained on Epic Records until 1991's You Oughta Be Here with Me.

Jones switched to MCA Records and released Walls Can Fall in 1992, which also certified gold in the United States. Among his other studio albums of the decade, High-Tech Redneck (1994) and Cold Hard Truth (1999) also certified gold in the United States. The latter album was his first with Asylum Records. His second Asylum release was the live disc, Live with the Possum (1999). A variety of labels issued compilations during the nineties. His 1998 compilation, 16 Biggest Hits certified gold in the United States. Jones released his final studio albums in the 2000s. Most of these releases were issued on Bandit Records. Among them was The Rock: Stone Cold Country 2001 and two albums that featured duet recordings. Bandit also issued several compilations, including the gold disc, 50 Years of Hits (2004). He also collaborated with Merle Haggard in 2006 on the charting disc, Kickin' Out the Footlights...Again. A posthumous disc was released in 2017 titled George Jones & The Smoky Mountain Boys.

== Studio albums ==
=== 1950s ===
List of studio albums, showing all relevant details
| Title | Album details |
|---|---|
| Grand Ole Opry's New Star | Released: November 1956; Label: Starday; Formats: LP |
| Country Church Time | Released: January 20, 1959; Label: Mercury; Formats: LP |
| George Jones Sings White Lightning and Other Favorites | Released: May 26, 1959; Label: Mercury; Formats: LP |

=== 1960s ===
List of studio albums, with selected chart positions, and other relevant details
| Title | Album details | Peak chart positions | |
| Title | Album details | US | US Cou. |
|---|---|---|---|
| George Jones Salutes Hank Williams | Released: May 1960; Label: Mercury; Formats: LP | — | — |
| George Jones Sings Country and Western Hits | Released: May 1961; Label: Mercury; Formats: LP | — | — |
| George Jones Sings from the Heart | Released: July 1962; Label: Mercury; Formats: LP | — | — |
| The New Favorites of George Jones | Released: September 1962; Label: United Artists; Formats: LP | — | — |
| George Jones Sings the Hits of His Country Cousins | Released: October 1962; Label: United Artists; Formats: LP | — | — |
| Homecoming in Heaven | Released: December 1962; Label: United Artists; Formats: LP | — | — |
| My Favorites of Hank Williams | Released: December 1962; Label: United Artists; Formats: LP | — | — |
| George Jones Sings Bob Wills | Released: December 1962; Label: United Artists; Formats: LP | — | — |
| I Wish Tonight Would Never End | Released: April 1963; Label: United Artists; Formats: LP | — | — |
| George Jones Sings More New Favorites | Released: February 1964; Label: United Artists; Formats: LP | — | — |
| George Jones Sings Like the Dickens! | Released: August 1964; Label: United Artists; Formats: LP | — | 6 |
| I Get Lonely in a Hurry | Released: November 1964; Label: United Artists; Formats: LP | — | 10 |
| Trouble in Mind | Released: March 1965; Label: United Artists; Formats: LP | — | — |
| The Race Is On | Released: April 1965; Label: United Artists; Formats: LP | 149 | 3 |
| Mr. Country & Western Music | Released: April 1965; Label: Musicor; Formats: LP | — | 13 |
| New Country Hits | Released: July 1965; Label: Musicor; Formats: LP | — | 5 |
| Old Brush Arbors | Released: July 1965; Label: Musicor; Formats: LP | — | — |
| Love Bug | Released: February 1966; Label: Musicor; Formats: LP | — | 7 |
| I'm a People | Released: April 1966; Label: Musicor; Formats: LP | — | 1 |
| We Found Heaven Right Here on Earth at "4033" | Released: October 24, 1966; Label: Musicor; Formats: LP | — | 3 |
| Walk Through This World with Me | Released: February 1967; Label: Musicor; Formats: LP | — | 2 |
| Cup of Loneliness | Released: May 1967; Label: Musicor; Formats: LP | — | — |
| George Jones Sings the Songs of Dallas Frazier | Released: January 1968; Label: Musicor; Formats: LP | — | 14 |
| If My Heart Had Windows | Released: April 1968; Label: Musicor; Formats: LP | — | 12 |
| The George Jones Story | Released: August 1968; Label: Musicor; Formats: LP | — | 18 |
| My Country | Released: December 1968; Label: Musicor; Formats: LP | — | 36 |
| I'll Share My World with You | Released: June 1969; Label: Musicor; Formats: LP | 185 | 5 |
| Where Grass Won't Grow | Released: November 1969; Label: Musicor; Formats: LP | — | 15 |
"—" denotes a recording that did not chart or was not released in that territory.

=== 1970s ===
List of studio albums, with selected chart positions, and other relevant details
| Title | Album details | Peak chart positions | | |
| Title | Album details | US | US Cou. | CAN Cou. |
|---|---|---|---|---|
| Will You Visit Me on Sunday | Released: May 1970; Label: Musicor; Formats: LP | — | 44 | — |
| George Jones with Love | Released: February 1971; Label: Musicor; Formats: LP | — | 9 | — |
| George Jones Sings the Great Songs of Leon Payne | Released: August 1971; Label: Musicor; Formats: LP | — | 26 | — |
| We Can Make It | Released: April 1972; Label: Epic; Formats: LP | — | 10 | — |
| A Picture of Me (Without You) | Released: November 1972; Label: Epic; Formats: LP | — | 3 | — |
| Nothing Ever Hurt Me (Half as Bad as Losing You) | Released: June 1973; Label: Epic; Formats: LP | — | 12 | — |
| In a Gospel Way | Released: February 22, 1974; Label: Epic; Formats: LP | — | 42 | — |
| The Grand Tour | Released: August 1974; Label: Epic; Formats: LP | — | 11 | — |
| Memories of Us | Released: September 7, 1975; Label: Epic; Formats: LP | — | 43 | — |
| The Battle | Released: February 1976; Label: Epic; Formats: LP | — | 36 | — |
| Alone Again | Released: September 1976; Label: Epic; Formats: LP | — | 9 | — |
| I Wanta Sing | Released: July 1977; Label: Epic; Formats: LP | — | 38 | — |
| Bartender's Blues | Released: May 1978; Label: Epic; Formats: LP | — | 34 | — |
| My Very Special Guests | Released: 1979; Label: Epic; Formats: LP | 206 | 38 | 3 |
"—" denotes a recording that did not chart or was not released in that territory.

=== 1980s ===
List of studio albums, with selected chart positions and certifications, and other relevant details
| Title | Album details | Peak chart positions | | | Certifications |
| Title | Album details | US | US Cou. | CAN Cou. | Certifications |
|---|---|---|---|---|---|
| I Am What I Am | Released: September 8, 1980; Label: Epic; Formats: LP, cassette | 132 | 7 | — | MC: Gold; RIAA: Platinum |
| Still the Same Ole Me | Released: November 7, 1981; Label: Epic; Formats: LP, cassette | 115 | 3 | — | RIAA: Gold |
| Shine On | Released: March 1983; Label: Epic; Formats: LP, cassette | — | 7 | — | |
| Jones Country | Released: October 1983; Label: Epic; Formats: LP, cassette | — | 27 | — | |
| You've Still Got a Place in My Heart | Released: May 14, 1984; Label: Epic; Formats: LP, cassette | — | 17 | 11 | |
| Ladies' Choice | Released: May 1984; Label: Epic; Formats: LP, cassette | — | 25 | — | |
| Who's Gonna Fill Their Shoes | Released: August 1985; Label: Epic; Formats: LP, cassette | — | 6 | — | |
| Wine Colored Roses | Released: January 7, 1986; Label: Epic; Formats: LP, cassette | — | 5 | — | RIAA: Gold |
| Too Wild Too Long | Released: January 20, 1987; Label: Epic; Formats: LP, cassette | — | 14 | — | |
| One Woman Man | Released: February 28, 1989; Label: Epic; Formats: LP, cassette | — | 13 | 21 | |
"—" denotes a recording that did not chart or was not released in that territory.

=== 1990s ===
List of studio albums, with selected chart positions and certifications, and other relevant details
| Title | Album details | Peak chart positions | | | Certifications |
| Title | Album details | US | US Cou. | CAN Cou. | Certifications |
|---|---|---|---|---|---|
| Hallelujah Weekend | Released: April 11, 1990; Label: Epic; Formats: CD, cassette | — | — | — | |
| You Oughta Be Here with Me | Released: August 20, 1990; Label: Epic; Formats: CD, cassette | — | 35 | — | |
| And Along Came Jones | Released: October 15, 1991; Label: MCA; Formats: CD, cassette | 148 | 22 | 26 | |
| Walls Can Fall | Released: October 27, 1992; Label: MCA; Formats: CD, cassette | 77 | 24 | 32 | RIAA: Gold |
| High-Tech Redneck | Released: November 23, 1993; Label: MCA; Formats: CD, cassette | 124 | 30 | — | RIAA: Gold |
| The Bradley Barn Sessions | Released: October 11, 1994; Label: MCA; Formats: CD, cassette | 142 | 23 | 11 | |
| I Lived to Tell It All | Released: August 13, 1996; Label: MCA; Formats: CD, cassette | 171 | 26 | — | |
| It Don't Get Any Better Than This | Released: April 7, 1998; Label: MCA; Formats: CD, cassette | — | 37 | 15 | |
| Cold Hard Truth | Released: June 22, 1999; Label: Asylum; Formats: CD, cassette | 53 | 5 | 8 | RIAA: Gold |
"—" denotes a recording that did not chart or was not released in that territory.

=== 2000s–2020s ===
List of studio albums, with selected chart positions, and other relevant details
| Title | Album details | Peak chart positions | | | |
| Title | Album details | US | US Chr. | US Cou. | US Ind. |
|---|---|---|---|---|---|
| The Rock: Stone Cold Country 2001 | Released: September 11, 2001; Label: Bandit; Formats: CD, cassette | 65 | — | 5 | — |
| The Gospel Collection | Released: April 4, 2003; Label: Bandit; Formats: CD, cassette | 131 | 9 | 19 | — |
| Hits I Missed...And One I Didn't | Released: September 13, 2005; Label: Bandit; Formats: CD | 79 | — | 13 | 6 |
| Burn Your Playhouse Down | Released: August 19, 2008; Label: Bandit; Formats: CD | 79 | — | 15 | — |
| George Jones & The Smoky Mountain Boys | Released: February 17, 2017; Label: Universal; Formats: CD | — | — | — | — |
| The Lost Nashville Sessions | Released: November 15, 2024; Label: Country Rewind; Formats: CD | — | — | — | — |
"—" denotes a recording that did not chart or was not released in that territory.

=== As a collaborative artist ===
List of studio albums, with selected chart positions, and other relevant details
| Title | Album details | Peak chart positions | | |
| Title | Album details | US | US Cou. | US Ind. |
|---|---|---|---|---|
| Duets Country Style (with Margie Singleton) | Released: November 1962; Label: Mercury; Formats: LP | — | — | — |
| Singing What's in Our Heart (with Melba Montgomery) | Released: November 1963; Label: United Artists; Formats: LP | — | 3 | — |
| Bluegrass Hootenanny (with Melba Montgomery) | Released: March 1964; Label: United Artists; Formats: LP | — | 12 | — |
| For the First Time! Two Great Stars - George Jones and Gene Pitney (with Gene Pitney) | Released: February 1965; Label: Musicor; Formats: LP | 141 | 3 | — |
| George Jones and Gene Pitney (Recorded in Nashville!) (with Gene Pitney) | Released: 1965; Label: Musicor; Formats: LP | — | — | — |
| It's Country Time Again! (with Gene Pitney) | Released: August 1965; Label: Musicor; Formats: LP | — | 17 | — |
| Close Together (As You and Me) (with Melba Montgomery) | Released: November 1966; Label: Musicor; Formats: LP | — | 28 | — |
| Party Pickin' (with Melba Montgomery) | Released: July 1967; Label: Musicor; Formats: LP | — | 37 | — |
| Double Trouble (with Johnny Paycheck) | Released: 1980; Label: Epic; Formats: LP, cassette | — | 45 | — |
| A Taste of Yesterday's Wine (with Merle Haggard) | Released: August 1982; Label: Epic; Formats: LP, cassette | 123 | 4 | — |
| Kickin' Out the Footlights...Again (with Merle Haggard) | Released: October 24, 2006; Label: Bandit; Formats: CD | 119 | 25 | 7 |
"—" denotes a recording that did not chart or was not released in that territory.

== Compilation albums ==
=== 1950s ===
List of compilation albums, showing all relevant details
| Title | Album details |
|---|---|
| Hillbilly Hit Parade (credited with various artists) | Released: November 1956; Label: Starday; Formats: LP |
| George Jones Singing 14 Top Country Song Favorites | Released: May 1957; Label: Starday; Formats: LP |
| Hilbilly Hit Parade, Vol. 1 (credited with various artists) | Released: July 1957; Label: Mercury/Starday; Formats: LP |
| Hilbilly Hit Parade, Vol. 2 (credited with various artists) | Released: November 1957; Label: Mercury/Starday; Formats: LP |

=== 1960s ===
List of compilation albums, with selected chart positions, and other relevant details
| Title | Album details | Peak chart positions |
| Title | Album details | US Country |
|---|---|---|
| The Crown Prince of Country Music | Released: January 1960; Label: Starday; Formats: LP | — |
| Greatest Hits | Released: September 1961; Label: Mercury; Formats: LP | — |
| George Jones Sings His Greatest Hits | Released: May 1962; Label: Starday; Formats: LP | — |
| The Fabulous Country Music Sound of George Jones | Released: 1962; Label: Starday; Formats: LP | — |
| The Novelty Side of George Jones | Released: April 1963; Label: Mercury; Formats: LP | — |
| The Ballad Side of George Jones | Released: September 1963; Label: Mercury; Formats: LP | — |
| The Best of George Jones | Released: September 1963; Label: United Artists; Formats: LP | 3 |
| Blue & Lonesome | Released: February 1964; Label: Mercury; Formats: LP | 11 |
| Country and Western No. 1 Male Singer | Released: June 1964; Label: United Artists; Formats: LP | — |
| Heartaches and Tears | Released: December 1964; Label: Mercury; Formats: LP | — |
| A King & Two Queens (with Judy Lynn and Melba Montgomery) | Released: 1964; Label: United Artists; Formats: LP | — |
| Greatest Hits, Vol. 2 | Released: November 1965; Label: Mercury; Formats: LP | — |
| Famous Country Duets (with Gene Pitney and Melba Montgomery) | Released: January 1966; Label: Musicor; Formats: LP | — |
| Singing the Blues | Released: 1965; Label: Mercury; Formats: LP | — |
| Starday Presents George Jones | Released: 1965; Label: Starday; Formats: LP | — |
| Long Live King George | Released: 1965; Label: Starday; Formats: LP | — |
| Blue Moon of Kentucky (with Melba Montgomery) | Released: February 1966; Label: United Artists; Formats: LP | — |
| The Young George Jones | Released: November 1966; Label: United Artists; Formats: 1966 | — |
| Country Heart | Released: 1966; Label: Musicor; Formats: LP | — |
| Golden Hits | Released: 1966; Label: Musicor; Formats: LP | 8 |
| George Jones' Greatest Hits | Released: February 1967; Label: Musicor; Formats: LP | 16 |
| Hits by George | Released: July 1967; Label: Musicor; Formats: LP | 9 |
| The George Jones Song Book and Picture Album | Released: 1967; Label: Starday; Formats: LP | — |
| Golden Hits, Vol. 2 | Released: 1967; Label: United Artists; Formats: LP | 10 |
| Golden Hits, Volume 3 | Released: 1969; Label: United Artists; Formats: LP | — |
| The Golden Country Hits of George Jones | Released: 1969; Label: Starday; Formats: LP | — |
"—" denotes a recording that did not chart or was not released in that territory.

=== 1970s ===
List of compilation albums, with selected chart positions, and other relevant details
| Title | Album details | Peak chart positions |
| Title | Album details | US Country |
|---|---|---|
| The Best of George Jones | Released: October 1970; Label: Musicor; Formats: LP | 10 |
| The Best of Sacred Music | Released: July 1971; Label: Musicor; Formats: LP | — |
| First in the Hearts of Country Music Lovers | Released: January 1972; Label: RCA Victor; Formats: LP | — |
| The Best of George Jones | Released: May 1972; Label: RCA Victor; Formats: LP | — |
| Poor Man's Riches | Released: June 1972; Label: RCA Victor; Formats: LP | — |
| I Made Leaving Easy for You | Released: June 1972; Label: RCA Victor; Formats: LP | — |
| George Jones and Friends | Released: June 1972; Label: RCA Victor; Formats: LP | — |
| Four-O-Thirty-Three | Released: September 1972; Label: RCA Victor; Formats: LP | — |
| Tender Years | Released: September 1972; Label: RCA Victor; Formats: LP | — |
| Take Me | Released: September 1972; Label: RCA Victor; Formats: LP | — |
| Wrapped Around Her Finger | Released: September 1972; Label: RCA Victor; Formats: LP | — |
| I Can Still See Him in Your Eyes | Released: January 1973; Label: RCA Victor; Formats: LP | — |
| The Best of George Jones, Vol. 2 | Released: August 1973; Label: RCA Victor; Formats: LP | 26 |
| You Gotta Me My Baby | Released: March 1974; Label: RCA Victor; Formats: LP | — |
| George Jones Sings His Songs | Released: July 1974; Label: RCA Victor; Formats: LP | 31 |
| I Can Love You Enough | Released: December 1974; Label: RCA Victor; Formats: LP | — |
| The Best of the Best | Released: May 1975; Label: RCA Victor; Formats: LP | 40 |
| The Best of George Jones | Released: March 1975; Label: Epic; Formats: LP | — |
| All-Time Greatest Hits, Vol. 1 | Released: 1977; Label: Epic; Formats: LP | — |
| Double Gold – The Best of George Jones | Released: 1977; Label: Musicor; Formats: LP | — |
| 16 Greatest Hits | Released: 1977; Label: Starday; Formats: LP | — |
"—" denotes a recording that did not chart or was not released in that territory.

=== 1980s ===
List of compilation albums, with selected chart positions and certifications, and other relevant details
| Title | Album details | Peak chart positions | | Certifications |
| Title | Album details | US | US Cou. | Certifications |
|---|---|---|---|---|
| Encore | Released: July 1981; Label: Epic; Formats: LP, cassette | — | 43 | |
| Anniversary – 10 Years of Hits | Released: September 1982; Label: Epic; Formats: LP, cassette | — | 16 | RIAA: Gold |
| Once You've Heard the Best | Released: 1982; Label: CBS; Formats: LP, cassette | — | — | |
| Down Home Country | Released: 1982; Label: CBS; Formats: LP, cassette | — | — | |
| George Jones Sings Country Classics | Released: 1983; Label: Columbia; Formats: LP, cassette | — | — | |
| By Request | Released: September 1984; Label: Epic; Formats: LP, cassette | — | 33 | |
| My Best to You | Released: 1984; Label: CBS; Formats: CD, Cassette | — | — | |
| She Thinks I Still Care | Released: 1984; Label: Capitol; Formats: Cassette | — | — | |
| The World of George Jones | Released: 1984; Label: CBS; Formats: Cassette | — | — | |
| The King of Country Music | Released: 1984; Label: Liberty; Formats: LP, cassette | — | — | |
| The Race Is On | Released: 1984; Label: Capitol; Formats: Cassette | — | — | |
| The Best of George Jones | Released: 1984; Label: CBS; Formats: LP | — | — | |
| Rockin' the Country | Released: 1985; Label: Mercury; Formats: LP, cassette | — | — | |
| Why Baby Why | Released: 1985; Label: Starday; Formats: Cassette | — | — | |
| The Race Is On | Released: 1985; Label: Starday; Formats: Cassette | — | — | |
| Take Me | Released: 1985; Label: Starday; Formats: Cassette | — | — | |
| Color of the Blues | Released: 1985; Label: Starday; Formats: Cassette | — | — | |
| Things Have Gone to Pieces | Released: 1985; Label: Starday; Formats: Cassette | — | — | |
| She Thinks I Still Care | Released: 1985; Label: Starday; Formats: Cassette | — | — | |
| Country! By George | Released: 1985; Label: Capitol; Formats: LP | — | — | |
| The Living Legend | Released: 1986; Label: CBS; Formats: LP, cassette | — | — | |
| Peace in the Valley | Released: 1986; Label: Liberty; Formats: LP | — | — | |
| Walking the Line (with Merle Haggard and Willie Nelson) | Released: 1987; Label: Epic; Formats: LP, cassette | — | 39 | |
| Super Hits | Released: September 1987; Label: Epic; Formats: CD, LP, cassette | 56 | 26 | RIAA: 2× Platinum |
| Honky Tonks and Heartaches | Released: 1987; Label: Mercury; Formats: LP | — | — | |
| Blue Moon of Kentucky | Released: 1987; Label: Mercury; Formats: LP | — | — | |
| Love Songs | Released: 1988; Label: CBS; Formats: CD, cassette | — | — | |
| Tour Cassette | Released: 1989; Label: Epic; Formats: Cassette | — | — | |
"—" denotes a recording that did not chart or was not released in that territory.

=== 1990s ===
List of compilation albums, with selected chart positions and certifications, and other relevant details
| Title | Album details | Peak chart positions | | Certifications |
| Title | Album details | US | US Cou. | Certifications |
|---|---|---|---|---|
| The Songs I Wanta Sing | Released: 1990; Label: Sony; Formats: CD, cassette | — | — | |
| Greatest Country Hits | Released: 1990; Label: Curb; Formats: CD, cassette | — | — | |
| The Golden Era of Capitol/UA Country | Released: 1990; Label: EMI; Formats: CD | — | — | |
| The Best of George Jones: 1955–1967 | Released: 1991; Label: Rhino; Formats: CD, cassette | — | — | |
| The Best of George Jones – Volume 1: Hardcore Honky Tonk | Released: 1991; Label: Mercury; Formats: CD, cassette | — | — | |
| All the Best | Released: 1991; Label: Sony; Formats: Cassette | — | — | |
| 36 All-Time Greatest Hits! | Released: 1992; Label: Sony; Formats: CD | — | — | |
| All the Best Volume 2 | Released: 1992; Label: Sony; Formats: Cassette | — | — | |
| Nothin' Like George Jones | Released: 1993; Label: Sony; Formats: CD, cassette | — | — | |
| Super Hits, Volume 2 | Released: March 9, 1993; Label: Epic; Formats: CD, cassette | — | — | |
| All Time Greatest Hits | Released: 1994; Label: Liberty; Formats: CD, cassette | — | — | |
| Cup of Loneliness: The Classic Mercury Years | Released: 1994; Label: Mercury; Formats: CD, cassette | — | — | |
| George Jones & Gene Pitney (with Gene Pitney) | Released: 1995; Label: Bear Family; Formats: CD | — | — | |
| Vintage Collections (with Melba Montgomery) | Released: January 23, 1996; Label: Capitol; Formats: CD | — | — | |
| She Thinks I Still Care: The George Jones Collection | Released: April 22, 1997; Label: Razor & Tie; Formats: CD | — | — | |
| The Hits | Released: August 26, 1997; Label: Mercury; Formats: CD, cassette | — | — | |
| 16 Biggest Hits | Released: July 14, 1998; Label: Epic/Legacy; Formats: Cassette, CD | 50 | 42 | RIAA: Platinum |
| The George Jones Collection | Released: June 1, 1999; Label: MCA; Formats: CD | — | — | |
| Classic George | Released: August 24, 1999; Label: Universal; Formats: CD, cassette | — | — | |
"—" denotes a recording that did not chart or was not released in that territory.

=== 2000s ===
List of compilation albums, with selected chart positions and certifications, and other relevant details
| Title | Album details | Peak chart positions | | Certifications |
| Title | Album details | US | US Cou. | Certifications |
|---|---|---|---|---|
| 20th Century Masters: The Millennium Collection | Released: May 9, 2000; Label: MCA/Mercury; Formats: CD | — | — | |
| Country Music Hall of Fame | Released: September 26, 2000; Label: Legacy; Formats: CD | — | — | |
| George Jones Sings Country Classics | Released: 2000; Label: EMI-Capitol; Formats: CD | — | — | |
| Musicor Hits: 1965-1971 | Released: 2000; Label: EMI Australia; Formats: CD | — | — | |
| The Definitive Country Collection | Released: February 2, 2001; Label: Columbia; Formats: CD | — | — | |
| 20th Century Masters: The Millennium Collection, Volume 2 | Released: September 10, 2002; Label: MCA/Mercury; Formats: CD | — | — | |
| Love Songs | Released: January 14, 2003; Label: Epic/Legacy; Formats: CD | — | — | |
| She Thinks I Still Care | Released: April 1, 2003; Label: EMI; Formats: CD | — | — | |
| The Very Best of Love | Released: August 5, 2003; Label: EMI/Madacy/Sony; Formats: CD | — | — | |
| 50 Years of Hits | Released: November 9, 2004; Label: Bandit; Formats: CD | 118 | 20 | RIAA: Gold |
| The Definitive Collection 1955-1962 | Released: June 22, 2004; Label: Mercury; Formats: CD | — | — | |
| Country Standards | Released: March 9, 2004; Label: EMI; Formats: CD | — | — | |
| The Complete '60s Duets (with Gene Pitney) | Released: 2004; Label: Varèse Sarabande; Formats: CD | — | — | |
| George Jones at His Best | Released: 2005; Label: Musicor; Formats: CD | — | — | |
| God's Country: George Jones and Friends | Released: October 17, 2006; Label: Category 5; Formats: CD | — | 58 | |
| The Essential George Jones | Released: March 28, 2006; Label: Epic/Legacy; Formats: CD, digital | — | — | |
| 40 Years of Duets | Released: March 6, 2007; Label: Time Life; Formats: CD | — | — | |
| Early Hits: The Starday Recordings | Released: July 10, 2007; Label: Time Life; Formats: CD | — | — | |
| A Collection Of My Best Recollection (George's Most Memorable Hits) | Released: 2009; Label: Cracker Barrel/Universal; Formats: CD | 88 | 22 | |
| Playlist: The Very Best of George Jones | Released: September 15, 2009; Label: Epic/Legacy/Sony; Formats: CD | — | — | |
"—" denotes a recording that did not chart or was not released in that territory.

=== 2010s ===
List of live albums, with selected chart positions, and other relevant details
| Title | Album details | Peak chart positions |
| Title | Album details | US Country |
|---|---|---|
| The Great Lost Hits | Released: February 23, 2010; Label: Time Life; Formats: CD | 35 |
| Sacred Songs | Released: February 7, 2010; Label: Time Life; Formats: CD | — |
| Hits | Released: February 15, 2011; Label: Bandit; Formats: CD | 39 |
| Great Country Hits of the '60s | Released: June 7, 2011; Label: Time Life; Formats: CD | — |
| Setlist: The Very Best of George Jones Live | Released: July 12, 2011; Label: Epic/Legacy/Sony; Formats: CD | — |
| Heartbreak Hotel: Gonna Shake This Shack Tonight | Released: November 15, 2011; Label: Bear Family; Formats: CD | — |
| The Great Lost Hits | Released: April 24, 2012; Label: Time Life; Formats: CD | 52 |
| Ten Great Songs | Released: July 3, 2012; Label: Capitol; Formats: CD | 56 |
| Heartaches and Hangovers | Released: October 9, 2012; Label: Time Life; Formats: CD | 57 |
| Country: George Jones | Released: November 27, 2012; Label: Sony; Formats: CD | 35 |
| Icon: The Best of George Jones | Released: July 30, 2013; Label: Capitol; Formats: CD, digital | — |
| Icon 2: The Best of George Jones | Released: July 30, 2013; Label: Capitol; Formats: CD | — |
| Amazing Grace | Released: September 10, 2013; Label: Bandit; Formats: CD | 34 |
| United Artists Rarities | Released: June 14, 2019; Label: Capitol; Formats: Digital | — |
"—" denotes a recording that did not chart or was not released in that territory.

== Live albums ==
List of live albums, with selected chart positions, and other relevant details
| Title | Album details | Peak chart positions |
| Title | Album details | US Country |
|---|---|---|
| First Time Live | Released: October 13, 1984; Label: Epic; Formats: LP, cassette | 45 |
| Live at Dancetown U.S.A. | Released: 1987; Label: Ace; Formats: LP, cassette | — |
| Live with the Possum | Released: November 9, 1999; Label: Asylum; Formats: CD, cassette | 72 |
"—" denotes a recording that did not chart or was not released in that territory.

== Box sets ==
List of box sets, showing all relevant details
| Title | Album details |
|---|---|
| The Essential George Jones: The Spirit of Country | Released: November 1, 1994; Label: Epic; Formats: CD, cassette |
| She Thinks I Still Care: The Complete United Artists Recordings, 1962-1964 | Released: November 12, 2007; Label: Bear Family; Formats: CD |
| The Hits...Then 'Til Now | Released: May 20, 2008; Label: Time Life; Formats: CD |
| Walk Through This World with Me – The Complete Musicor Recordings, 1965-1971: Pt. 1 | Released: May 8, 2008; Label: Bear Family; Formats: CD |
| A Good Year for the Roses: The Complete Musicor Recordings, 1965-1971, Pt. 2 | Released: June 2, 2009; Label: Bear Family; Formats: CD |
| The Epic Years: The Box Set Series | Released: October 5, 2010; Label: Epic/Legacy; Formats: CD |
| Birth of a Legend: The Truly Complete Starday and Mercury Recordings 1954-1961 | Released: October 5, 2010; Label: Bear Family; Formats: CD |
"—" denotes a recording that did not chart or was not released in that territory.

== Video albums ==
List of video albums, showing all relevant details
| Title | Album details |
|---|---|
| The Living Legend in Concert! | Released: 1987; Label: Country Roads; Formats: LaserDisc, VHS |
| Same. Ole. Me | Released: 1989; Label: Hallway; Formats: VHS |
| Golden Hits | Released: October 4, 1994; Label: Kultur; Formats: VHS |
| Live in Tennessee | Released: 1994; Label: Pioneer Artists; Formats: LaserDisc, VHS |
| A Video Biography and Live Concert on One | Released: 2001; Label: Prism; Formats: DVD |
| Live Recordings from the Church Street Station | Released: July 13, 2004; Label: MVD; Formats: DVD |
| The Race Is On: In Concert | Released: October 5, 2007; Label: Immortal; Formats: DVD |
| 50th Anniversary Tribute Concert | Released: 2007; Label: New West; Formats: DVD |
| In Concert: Orange Blossom Special | Released: April 9, 2009; Label: Forever/Music Pro; Formats: DVD |
| Bartender's Blues: In Memory of George Jones | Released: February 11, 2014; Label: NA; Formats: DVD |

== See also ==
- George Jones singles discography
