= God's Country: George Jones and Friends =

Compilation album (Tribute album) by George Jones
- Released: October 17, 2006
- Recorded: Summer 2006
- Genre: Country
- Length: 31:20
- Label: Category 5 Records
- Producer: Billy Joe Walker Jr. Allen Reynolds

George Jones chronology
Hits I Missed...And One I Didn't (2005)	God's Country: George Jones and Friends (2006)	Kickin' Out the Footlights...Again (2006)

Professional ratings
Review scores
Source	Rating
Allmusic	2/5 stars

God's Country: George Jones and Friends is a tribute album to American country music artist George Jones. Released on October 17, 2006 on the Category 5 Records label. It features several of Jones' most well-known songs, such as "White Lightnin'," and "He Stopped Loving Her Today". Various artists contributed cover versions to the album, including Vince Gill, Tanya Tucker and Sammy Kershaw. Jones also appears on this album singing the title track "God's Country", his first brand new song in five years. The album includes a behind-the-scenes DVD of its making. George Jones appears on the album courtesy of Bandit Records.

== Track listing ==
=== Disc 1 (CD) ===
No.	Title	Writer(s)	Artist(s)	Length
1.	"God's Country"	Neal Coty, Jimmy Melton, Jon Henderson	George Jones	2:58
2.	"She Thinks I Still Care"	Dickey Lee	Vince Gill	3:02
3.	"Walk Through This World with Me"	Kay Savage, Sandra Seamons	Mark Chesnutt	2:54
4.	"Window Up Above"	George Jones	Tanya Tucker	4:06
5.	"Take Me"	Jones, Leon Payne	Pam Tillis	3:24
6.	"White Lightning"	J. P. Richardson	Joe Diffie	2:40
7.	"He Stopped Loving Her Today"	Bobby Braddock, Curly Putman	Sammy Kershaw	3:19
8.	"Beer Run"	Kim Williams, Amanda Williams, Keith Anderson, George Ducas, Kent Blazy	Garth Brooks and George Jones	3:02
9.	"Golden Ring/We're Gonna Hold On"	Braddock, Rafe Van Hoy, Jones, Earl Montgomery	Joe Diffie and Shauna Feagan	4:39
10.	"The One I Loved Back Then (The Corvette Song)"	Gary Gentry	Tracy Lawrence	2:36

=== Disc 2 (DVD) ===
1. The Making of the Album Documentary [DVD]

== Personnel ==
- Eddie Bayers – Drums
- Mike Brignardello – Bass
- Bob Bullock – Engineer
- Joe Chemay – Bass
- Lisa Cochran – Background Vocals
- J. T. Corenflos – Electric guitar
- Bill Decker – Mixing
- Joe Diffie – Background Vocals
- Dan Dugmore – Steel Guitar
- Stuart Duncan – Fiddle
- Buddy Emmons – Steel Guitar
- Brandon Epps – Assistant Engineer
- Larry Franklin – Fiddle
- Paul Franklin – Steel Guitar
- Derek Garten – Assistant Engineer
- Tony Harrell – Piano
- Aubrey Haynie – Fiddle
- Wes Hightower – Background Vocals
- John Hobbs – Piano
- Jim Hoke – Acoustic guitar, Harmonica
- John Jarvis – Piano
- Troy Lancaster – Electric guitar
- Chris Leuzinger – Electric guitar
- B. James Lowry – Acoustic guitar
- Liana Manis – Background Vocals
- Sam Martin – Assistant Engineer
- Brent Mason – Electric guitar
- Andrew Mendelson – Mastering
- Mark Miller – Engineer
- Greg Morrow – Drums
- Gordon Mote – Piano
- Steve Nathan – Strings
- Denny Purcell – Mastering
- Allen Reynolds – Producer
- Michael Rhodes – Bass
- John Wesley Ryles – Background Vocals
- Hank Singer – Fiddle
- Brian Sutton – Acoustic guitar
- Pam Tillis – Background Vocals
- Wanda Vick – Dobro
- Billy Joe Walker Jr. – Producer, Gut String Guitar
- Ginny Johnson Walker – Production Assistant
- Lonnie Wilson – Drums
- Glenn Worf – Bass

== Chart performance ==
Chart performance for God's Country: George Jones and Friends
Chart (2006)	Peak position
US Top Country Albums (Billboard)	58
US Independent Albums (Billboard)	46
