= All-Time Greatest Hits, Vol. 1 =

Compilation album by George Jones
- Released: 1977
- Recorded: Nashville
- Genre: Country
- Label: Epic
- Producer: Billy Sherrill

George Jones compilation albums chronology
Hits by George (1967)	All-Time Greatest Hits, Vol. 1 (1977)	Encore - George Jones (1981)

Professional ratings
Review scores
Source	Rating
Christgau's Record Guide	A−
The Rolling Stone Album Guide	3.5/5 stars

All-Time Greatest Hits, Vol. 1 is an album by George Jones released on Epic Records in 1977. The album includes re-recordings of old hits, including the number ones "White Lightning", "Tender Years", "She Thinks I Still Care", and "Walk Through This World with Me". The album provides an opportunity to hear how an older Jones and producer Billy Sherrill reinterpret the material. Sherrill remains faithful to the original arrangements, although the songs certainly have a smoother sound than some of the original versions. The album peaked at number 31 on the Billboard country albums chart.

== Reception ==
AllMusic: "The uptempo stuff doesn't fare particularly well - young Jones was wild-eyed and crazy, giving 'The Race Is On', 'White Lightning'', and 'Why Baby Why' real kick; here they sound harnessed - but the ballads (which account for most of the record) are satisfying...On occasion, the songs gain resonance by being delivered by an older, nuanced singer (this is especially true of 'The Window Up Above' and 'She Thinks I Still Care'), which is the main reason collectors may want to pick this up..."

== Track listing ==
1. "The Race Is On" (Don Rollins)
2. "My Favorite Lies" (George Jones, Jack Ripley)
3. "Tender Years" (Jones, Darrell Edwards)
4. "The Window Up Above" (Jones)
5. "She Thinks I Still Care" (Dickey Lee, Steve Duffy)
6. "White Lightning (J.P. Richardson)
7. "Walk Through This World with Me" (Sandy Seamons, Kaye Savage)
8. "She's Mine" (Jones, Ripley)
9. "I'll Share My World With You" (Ben Wilson)
10. "Why Baby Why" (Jones, Edwards)
