= I Can't Get There from Here =

Single by George Jones

from the album George Jones Sings the Songs of Dallas Frazier
- B-side: "Poor Man's Riches"
- Released: 1967
- Recorded: 1967
- Genre: Country
- Length: 2:30
- Label: Musicor
- Songwriter: Dallas Frazier
- Producer: Pappy Daily

George Jones singles chronology
"Walk Through This World with Me" (1967)	"I Can't Get There from Here" (1967)	"If My Heart Had Windows" (1968)

"I Can't Get There from Here" is a song by American country singer George Jones. It was released as a single on the Musicor label in 1967. It was composed by Dallas Frazier. Although he didn't write it, "I Can't Get There from Here" is one in a long list of songs that Jones would record as if it was torn from the pages of his diary; as Randy Travis stated in the 1990 Jones video biography Same Ole Me, "It's almost like he's lived every minute of every word he sings, and there's very few people who can do that." Jones, who would be admitted into a neurological hospital to seek treatment for his binge drinking in 1967, had already gained a reputation as a notorious hell raiser, imbuing Frazier's words with a weary authenticity:

Surely there's a place to rest a tortured mind
Oh, what I'd give if I could find
A place where there's no mem'ry of all those wasted years
But they all say I can't get there from here

The song reached No. 5 on the Billboard country singles chart.
