= Hits by George =

Greatest hits album by George Jones
- Released: July 1967
- Genre: Country
- Length: 22:35
- Label: Musicor
- Producer: Pappy Daily

George Jones compilation albums chronology
Hits by George (1967)	All-Time Greatest Hits, Vol. 1 (1977)

Singles from Hits by George
- 1. "Treasure of Love" Released: October 1958

Professional ratings
Review scores
Source	Rating
AllMusic	3/5 stars

Hits by George is a greatest hits album by American country music artist George Jones released in July 1967 on the Musicor Records label.

== Background ==
Hits By George includes mostly remakes of songs from earlier in Jones's career, including the number one hits "White Lightning" and "She Thinks I Still Care". Part of the motivation for the release may have been the number of Jones releases that were still being issued by the singer's former record label Mercury Records, which owned the rights to masters that dated back to the mid-1950s. It continued Jones's string of top ten albums, reaching number 9.

== Track listing ==
1. "White Lightning" (J.P. Richardson) – 2:35
2. "Accidentally on Purpose" (George Jones, Darrell Edwards) – 2:36
3. "Talk to Me Lonesome Heart" (James O'Gwynn) – 2:37
4. "The Window Up Above" (Jones) – 2:40
5. "Tender Years" (Jones, Edwards) – 2:15
6. "When My Heart Hurts No More" (Edwards, Helen Cross) – 2:37
7. "Poor Man's Riches" (Benny Barnes, H.G. "Dee" Marais) – 2:00
8. "Time Lock" (Joe Carson) – 2:30
9. "Treasure of Love" (Jones, Richardson) – 2:18
10. "She Thinks I Still Care" (Dickey Lee, Steve Duffy) – 2:45

== Chart positions ==
Year	Chart	Position
1967	Billboard Country Albums	9
