= George Jones Sings His Greatest Hits =

Compilation album by George Jones
- Released: 1962
- Recorded: 1955–1957
- Genre: Country
- Label: Starday
- Producer: Don Pierce

George Jones chronology
Sings Country and Western Hits (1962)	George Jones Sings His Greatest Hits (1962)	Sings from the Heart (1962)

George Jones Sings His Greatest Hits is an album by George Jones, released on Starday Records in 1962.

Although the album is billed as a greatest hits package, it is identical to his 1957 LP Grand Ole Opry's New Star with a shuffled running order. "Why Baby Why," "What Am I Worth," "Yearning" (duet with Jeanette Hicks), and "You Gotta Be My Baby" were top ten hits.

AllMusic noted about the album, "From Saturday night honky tonkin' to Sunday morning churchgoing, George Jones makes it all swing hard, country-style, on these 14 topnotch cuts".

== Track listing ==
1. "Why Baby Why" (George Jones/Darrell Edwards)
2. "It's Okay" (Jones)
3. "Still Hurting" (Jones)
4. "Boat of Life" (Jones)
5. "Seasons of My Heart" (Jones/Edwards)
6. "Taggin' Along" (Jones/Burl Stephens)
7. "Yearning" (with Jeanette Hicks) (Eddie Eddings/Jones)
8. "Hold Everything" (Jones)
9. "Your Heart" (Jones/Edwards)
10. "Play It Cool" (Jones)
11. "What Am I Worth" (Jones/Edwards)
12. "Let Him Know" (Jones)
13. "You Gotta Be My Baby" (Jones)
14. "I'm Ragged But I'm Right" (Jones)
