= Old Brush Arbors =

Studio album by George Jones
- Released: July 1965
- Genre: Country; Gospel
- Length: 31:56
- Label: Musicor
- Producer: Pappy Daily

George Jones chronology
New Country Hits (1965)	Old Brush Arbors (1965)	Trouble In Mind (1966)

Professional ratings
Review scores
Source	Rating
Allmusic	3/5 stars

Old Brush Arbors is an album by American country music artist George Jones released in 1965 on the Musicor Records label.

The album is George Jones' third collection of gospel songs and draws heavily from religious and thematic roots. The best-known track is the title song, "Old Brush Arbors," which features poignant lyrics about attending roadside revival meetings as a child. The song peaked at No. 30 on the country charts and is frequently praised as the highlight of the record.

"The Selfishness in Man" had been previously released earlier in 1965 on his album Mr. Country & Western Music.

== Track listing ==
No.	Title	Writer(s)	Length
1.	"Old Brush Arbors"	Gordon Ardis, Darrell Edwards	2:27
2.	"Will There Be Stars in My Crown?"	George Jones Jimmy Sweeney, Edmond Hewitt	2:59
3.	"Leaning on the Everlasting Arms"	Elisha A. Hoffman, Anthony J. Showalter	2:23
4.	"Won't It Be Wonderful There?"	Jones	2:18
5.	"Lord You've Been Mighty Good to Me"	Earl Montgomery	2:25
6.	"The Selfishness in Man"	Leon Payne	2:33
7.	"I'll Fly Away"	Albert E. Brumley	2:38
8.	"Where We Never Grow Old"	James C. Moore	2:22
9.	"If You Believe"	Darrell Edwards)	2:10
10.	"The Lily of the Valley"	Charles William Fry, William Shakespeare Hays	2:08
11.	"How Beautiful Heaven Must Be"	A.P. Bland, A.S. Bridgewater	2:21
12.	"Well It's All Right"	Cindy Walker	2:56

== Charting Singles ==
Single	Chart	Peak position
Old Brush Arbors	U.S. Billboard Hot Country Singles	30
