= Live at Dancetown U.S.A. =

Live album by George Jones and the Jones Boys
- Released: 1987
- Recorded: June 1965
- Genre: Country
- Label: Ace

George Jones and the Jones Boys chronology
Wine Colored Roses (1986)	Live at Dancetown U.S.A. (1987)	Too Wild Too Long (1987)

Live at Dancetown U.S.A. is a live album by American country music artist George Jones. It was recorded in 1965 but was not released until 1987.

== Background ==
Recorded in June 1965 at a hall on Airline Drive in Houston during Jones's heyday in the Texas honky tonks, it shows the country star and his backing band the Jones Boys performing his biggest hits, including "White Lightning" and "She Thinks I Still Care." In addition to the Jones cuts, there are several instrumentals and nine songs performed by George's supporting vocalist Don Adams. Perhaps the biggest surprise in the set is the cover of the 1957 rock and roll song "Bony Moronie" by Larry Williams. Jones, who had recorded a handful of rockabilly sides early in his career with Starday, sounds less than enthusiastic as he introduces the number: "We had a request for a fast one. We usually don't do rock and roll numbers. I don't know but a verse of this one but we'll do it. It goes like this."

== Reception ==
AllMusic: "Not only is the music superb -- on this date, the Jones Boys featured steel guitarist Buddy Emmons and Cajun fiddler Rufus Thibodeaux - but it illustrates exactly what a honky tonk concert was like in the '60s. For hardcore George Jones fans, it's an essential addition, one that's revelatory and highly entertaining."

== Track listing ==
1. "Untitled Instrumental"
2. "One More Time"
3. "White Lightning" (J.P. Richardson)
4. "Something I Dreamed" (Harlan Howard)
5. "Achin', Breakin' Heart" (Rick Hall)
6. "We Must Have Been Out of Our Minds" (Earl Montgomery)
7. "Window Up Above" (George Jones)
8. "Bonie Moronie" (Larry Williams)
9. "She Thinks I Still Care" (Dickey Lee, Steve Duffy)
10. "Rio City Chimes" (Buddy Emmons)
11. "Accidentally On Purpose" (Jones, Darrell Edwards)
12. "Who Shot Sam" (Jones, Edwards, Ray Jackson)
13. "Intermission Riff" (Steve Graham, Ray Wetzel)
14. "Untitled Instrumental"
15. "Please Talk to My Heart"
16. "Sing a Sad Song" (Wynn Stewart)
17. "Panhandle Rag" (Leon McAuliffe)
18. "Act Naturally" (Voni Morrison, Johnny Russell)
19. "I'm Ragged But I'm Right" (Jones)
20. "Poor Man's Riches" (Benny Barnes, Dee Marais)
21. "Tender Years" (Jones, Edwards)
22. "Where Does a Little Tear Come From" (Majorie Barton/Johnny MacRae)
23. "Jole Blon" (Harry Choates)
24. "Big Harlan Taylor" (Roger Miller)
25. "She's Lonesome Again" (Jones)
26. "The Race Is On" (Don Rollins)
