= The Little Old Sod Shanty on the Claim =

Song
- Written: c. 1880
- Genre: Western ballad
- Composer(s): Will S. Hays (adapted from "The Little Old Log Cabin In The Lane")
- Lyricist(s): Oliver Edwin Murray

"The Little Old Sod Shanty On The Claim" is an American folk song written by Oliver Edwin Murray (O.E. Murray) of South Dakota. It appeared somewhere around 1880 published in several American newspapers. The printings suggested that it be sung to the tune of "The Little Old Log Cabin In The Lane" written by Will Hays in 1871. The song tells of the trials of homesteading on the Great Plains and became immensely popular among the settlers. The title comes from variations of a refrain found in the verses and the chorus:

... my little old sod shanty on my claim.

Jack Thorp published a version of the song in his 1908 book, Songs of the Cowboys, titled "Little Adobe Casa" which he attributed to a Tom Beasley written in 1887.

"The Little Old Sod Shanty On The Claim" has been performed and recorded numerous times. Slim Wilson's December 1936 recording of the song is part of the Traditional Music and Spoken Word Catalog of the American Folklife Center at the Library of Congress.

== Bibliography ==
- Lomax, John A., M.A. "The Little Old Sod Shanty". Cowboy Songs and Other Frontier Ballads, p. 186. The MacMillan Company, 1918. Online edition (pdf)
- Pound, Louise (ed.). "The Little Old Sod Shanty On The Claim". American Ballads and Songs, p. 165. New York: Charles Scribner's Sons (1922).
- Pound, Louise. Poetic Origins and the Ballad. New York: The Macmillan Company (1921).
- Thorp, N. Howard "Jack". "Little Adobe Casa". Songs of the Cowboys, p. 93. Houghton Mifflin Company, 1908, 1921.
- Waltz, Robert B; David G. Engle. "Little Old Sod Shanty On My Claim". The Traditional Ballad Index: An Annotated Bibliography of the Folk Songs of the English-Speaking World. Hosted by California State University, Fresno, Folklore, 2007.
- Wattles, Willard Austin. "The Little Old Sod Shanty On the Claim: A Frontier song Tune". Sunflowers: A Book of Kansas Poems, p. 104. Chicago: A.C. McClurg & Co. (1916).
- "Memorial and biographical record; an illustrated compendium of biography, containing a compendium of local biography, including biographical sketches of prominent old settlers and representative citizens of South Dakota..." Chicago: G. A. Ogle & Co., 1899. p. 911.
