= The Little Old Log Cabin in the Lane =

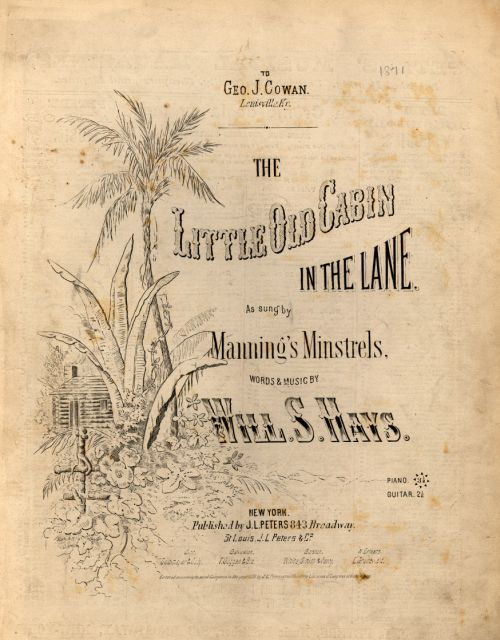
- Sheet music cover (1871)

Song
- Published: 1871
- Genre: Popular song, minstrel
- Songwriter: Will S. Hays

"The Little Old Log Cabin in the Lane" (Roud 2473) is a popular song written by Will S. Hays in 1871 for the minstrel trade. Written in dialect, the song tells of an elderly man, presumably a slave or former slave, passing his later years in a broken-down old log cabin. The title is from a refrain: "de little old log cabin in de lane".

The song itself was popular, resulting in several answer songs, but the melody was even more widely used, including songs set in the cowboy West: western songs ("The Little Old Sod Shanty on the Claim", "Little Joe, The Wrangler"); railroad songs ("Little Red Caboose Behind the Train"); and even hymns ("The Lily of the Valley").

The Ballad Index by Robert B. Waltz and David G. Engle lists more than 20 recordings of the song from 1903 to 1940. The Metropolitan Quartet recorded the harmonized sentimental minstrel version in 1918, which has been digitized for online listening at the University of California at Santa Barbara.

Performers modified the lyric over the years, eliminating Hays' "darky" dialect along with the original reference to slavery. For example, the "old master and mistress" became the narrator's parents in mid-20th century bluegrass versions.

Fiddlin' John Carson's recording of "The Little Old Log Cabin in the Lane" was one of the first commercial recordings by a rural white musician. Its popularity ensured that the industry would continue recording rural folk songs. The only known recording of banjo player Uncle John Scruggs was a newsreel film performance of this song.

== Lyrics ==
Oh I'm gettin' old and feeble and I cannot work no more
The children no more gather 'round my door
And old masters and old mrs they are sleepin' side by side
Near da little old log cabin in da lane

Oh the chimney's fallen down and the roof's all caved in
Lettin' in the sunshine and the rain
And the only friend I've got now is that good old dog of mine
And the little old log cabin in the lane

Oh the trees have all growed up that lead around the hill
The fences have all gone to decay
And the creeks have all dried up where we used to go to mill
And things have changed of course in another ways

Oh I ain't got long to stay here what little time I've got
I want to rest content while I remain
'Til death shall call this dog and me to find a better home
And leave th' little old log cabin in the lane

== Bibliography ==
- Carlin, Richard. Country Music: A Biographical Dictionary. Oxfordshire: Routledge (2002).
- Thorp, N. Howard "Jack". Songs of the Cowboys. New Mexico: News Print Shop (1908).
- Waltz, Robert B; David G. Engle. "Little Old Log Cabin in the Lane". The Traditional Ballad Index: An Annotated Bibliography of the Folk Songs of the English-Speaking World. Hosted by California State University, Fresno, Folklore, 2007.
