= Heartaches & Tears =

Compilation album by George Jones
- Released: September 1964
- Recorded: 1955–1962
- Genre: Country
- Label: Mercury Records
- Producer: Don Pierce

George Jones chronology
Blue & Lonesome (1964)	Heartaches & Tears (1964)	George Jones Sings Like the Dickens! (1964)

Heartaches & Tears is an album by George Jones. It was released on Mercury Records in 1964 and collects several hits with obscure cuts not found on other Jones compilations. "Tender Years" had been a number-one hit in 1961. "You Gotta Be My Baby", "The Window Up Above", and "Yearning" (a duet with Jeanette Hicks) had all been top-ten hits.

== Track listing ==
1. "I've Got a New Heartache" (Wayne Walker)
2. "Flame In My Heart" (with Virginia Spurlock) (George Jones, Bernard Spurlock)
3. "You Gotta Be My Baby" (Jones)
4. "You're Back Again" (Jones, Hank Locklin)
5. "When Two Worlds Collide" (Bill Anderson, Roger Miller)
6. "Tender Years" (Jones, Darrell Edwards)
7. "Window Up Above" (Jones)
8. "Everything Ain't Right"
9. "I Can't Help It (If I'm Still in Love with You)" (Hank Williams)
10. "Yearning" (with Jeanette Hicks) (Jones, Eddie Eddings)
11. "No Use To Cry" (Jones)
12. "I'm With The Wrong One" (with Margie Singleton) (Earl Montgomery)
