= Kickin' Out the Footlights...Again =

Studio album by George Jones and Merle Haggard
- Released: October 24, 2006
- Recorded: Summer 2006
- Genre: Country
- Label: Bandit
- Producer: Merle Haggard, Lou Bradley, Keith Stegall

George Jones chronology
| God's Country: George Jones and Friends (2006) | Kickin' Out the Footlights...Again (2006) | Burn Your Playhouse Down (2008) |

Merle Haggard chronology
| Chicago Wind (2005) | Kickin' Out the Footlights...Again (2006) | Last of the Breed (2007) |

Kickin' Out the Footlights...Again is a studio album by American country music artists George Jones and Merle Haggard, released in 2006.

== Background ==
Jones and Haggard had previously recorded one album together in 1982, A Taste of Yesterday's Wine, which produced the number one single "Yesterday's Wine". Their friendship stretched much farther back, however, to when Jones first heard the Haggard-penned "I Threw Away the Rose," which rose to number 2. In his 1981 autobiography Merle Haggard: Sing Me Back Home, Haggard recalls playing somewhere in Texas when someone handed him a phone saying Jones was on the line. Jones slurred his appreciation for the song and said he was coming to see him immediately. "It wasn't hard to see that ol' George was pretty wasted," Haggard wrote. "I hung up the phone and some of the others in the room said they wouldn't be surprised if he showed up. I told them I didn't think so, 'cause hell, he was supposed to be doing concerts all week." The next day Jones arrived, kicking the door in and eventually folding up the roll-away bed that Haggard's sleeping manager Fuzzy Owen was on and wheeling it out of the room. Jones would record "I Threw Away the Rose" himself, as well as several other Haggard compositions over the course of his career, and say repeatedly over the years that, next to Hank Williams, Haggard was his favorite singer.

Jones had previously recorded Haggard's early hit "All My Friends Are Strangers" when he was on the Musicor record label in the 1960s. Haggard had recorded Jones's smash "She Thinks I Still Care" on his 1969 album A Portrait of Merle Haggard.

Kickin' Out The Footlights...Again would be the final album Jones recorded before his death in 2013.

== Reception ==
Professional ratings
Review scores
| Source | Rating |
|---|---|
| Allmusic | 3/5 stars |
| Robert Christgau | (*) |

The album reached number 25 on the Billboard country albums chart and received positive reviews, although many critics took note of Jones's increasingly withered voice. Stephen Thomas Erlewine of AllMusic wrote "Of the two, George sounds a bit worse for wear—his voice is a little thin and slightly scratchy—but even if their age is evident... the album also illustrates exactly why Jones and Haggard are two of the greatest vocalists in country music history." Music critic Robert Christgau wrote "Hag keeps getting Haggier, but that thing in George's voice that was grainy like cornbread is turning to mush."

== Track listing ==
| No. | Title | Writer(s) | Length |
|---|---|---|---|
| 1. | "Footlights" | Merle Haggard | 3:39 |
| 2. | "The Race Is On" | Don Rollins | 2:11 |
| 3. | "The Way I Am" | Sonny Throckmorton | 3:05 |
| 4. | "She Thinks I Still Care" | Dickey Lee | 2:38 |
| 5. | "All My Friends Are Strangers" | Liz Anderson | 2:36 |
| 6. | "Things Have Gone to Pieces" | Leon Payne | 3:01 |
| 7. | "I Think I'll Just Stay Here and Drink" | Haggard | 4:33 |
| 8. | "Born with the Blues" | Haggard | 4:46 |
| 9. | "Sick, Sober and Sorry" | Tex Atchison, Eddie Hazelwood | 3:05 |
| 10. | "I Always Get Lucky with You" | Haggard, Gary Church, Freddy Powers, Tex Whitson | 3:21 |
| 11. | "Sing Me Back Home" | Haggard, Buck Owens | 2:58 |
| 12. | "Window Up Above" | George Jones | 2:38 |
| 13. | "You Take Me for Granted" | Leona Williams | 2:48 |
| 14. | "Don't Get Around Much Anymore" | Sidney Keith, Edward Kennedy | 3:00 |

== Personnel ==
- Merle Haggard – vocals, guitar
- George Jones – vocals
- Norm Hamlet – pedal steel guitar
- Eddie Bayers – drums
- Doug Colosio – piano
- Hargus "Pig" Robbins – piano
- Stuart Duncan – fiddle, mandolin
- Larry Franklin – fiddle
- Paul Franklin – steel guitar
- Scott Joss – guitar
- Liana Manis – background vocals
- Brent Mason – acoustic & electric guitar
- John Wesley Ryles – background vocals
- Marty Slayton – background vocals
- Keith Stegall – Producer
- Norman Stevens – guitar
- Rhonda Vincent – background vocals
- Bruce Watkins – acoustic guitar
- Kevin Williams – bass
- Glenn Worf – bass

=== Production ===
- Merle Haggard – producer
- Keith Stegall – producer
- Lou Bradley – producer, engineer
- Susan Nadler – executive producer
- Evelyn Shriver – executive producer
- Matt Rovey – engineer, assistant engineer
- Jason Campbell – production coordination
- Michael Campbell – project manager
- John Kelton – engineer, mixing
- Matt Lumpkin – photography
- Nancy Jones – photography
- Jerry Jordan – photography
- Todd Tilwell – assistant engineer
- David Gulliver – assistant engineer
- Nathan Dickinson – assistant engineer
- Hank Williams – mastering
