= George Jones Sings Country and Western Hits =

Sings Country and Western Hits

Studio album by George Jones
- Released: May 1961
- Recorded: August 1959 – April 1960
- Studio: Bradley Film & Recording (Nashville, Tennessee)
- Genre: Country
- Length: 28:55
- Label: Mercury
- Producer: Shelby Singleton

George Jones chronology
Salutes Hank Williams (1960)	Sings Country and Western Hits (1961)	Sings from the Heart (1962)

Singles from Sings Country and Western Hits
- 1. "Window Up Above" Released: June 20, 1960; 2. "I Love You, Because (b-side)" Released: February 2, 1963

Sings Country and Western Hits is the 1961 country music studio album released in May 1961 by George Jones. The album was Jones' tenth studio album release since his debut LP in 1956. It would be one of his last with Mercury Records, as he switched to United Artists in late 1961.

The album featured Jones' covers of hits in the "Country and Western Charts," that were previously recorded by his fellow country artists or himself. It featured his second #1 hit "Window Up Above," released the previous year. The LP became one of Jones' best sounds during the early 1960s, released after another great album, "Salutes Hank Williams".

== Reception ==
Professional ratings
Review scores
Source	Rating
Allmusic	3/5 stars

Eugene Chadbourne of AllMusic writes of Sings Country and Western Hits: "This is a recording of songs played pure and simple, from the heart and for a little bit of money, and recorded properly but without a lot of production hoopla" and suggest listening to it is the equivalent of going to hear a really great country cover band in which Jones is the lead singer.

== Track listing ==
Side One
No.	Title	Writer(s)	Length
1.	"Heartaches by the Numbers"	Harlan Howard	2:36
2.	"I Love You Because"	Leon Payne	2:52
3.	"If You've Got the Money (I've Got the Time)"	Lefty Frizzell, Jim Beck	2:09
4.	"Talk to Me Lonesome Heart"	James O'Gwynn	2:20
5.	"Poor Man's Riches"	Benny Barnes, Dee Marais	1:59
6.	"I'll Be There (If You Want Me)"	Ray Price, Rusty Gabbard	2:11

Side Two
No.	Title	Writer(s)	Length
1.	"Oh Lonesome Me"	Don Gibson	2:41
2.	"I Walk the Line"	Johnny Cash	2:14
3.	"Life to Go"	George Jones	2:28
4.	"The Window Up Above"	Jones	2:37
5.	"Just One More"	Jones	2:34
6.	"It's Been So Long"	Ernest Tubb	2:14
