= The Gospel Collection =

Studio album by George Jones
- Released: April 4, 2003
- Genre: Country, gospel
- Length: 79:48
- Label: Bandit Records
- Producer: Billy Sherrill

George Jones chronology
The Rock: Stone Cold Country 2001 (2001)	The Gospel Collection (2003)	Hits I Missed...And One I Didn't (2005)

The Gospel Collection is the 58th studio album by American country music singer George Jones, released on April 4, 2003 on the Bandit Records label, and the first single, "I Know A Man Who Can" was released through Rick Hendrix Company.

== Reception ==
Professional ratings
Review scores
Source	Rating
Allmusic	link

Jones's 58th album peaked at number 19 on the Billboard country albums chart and number 3 on the Billboard Christian albums chart.

Thom Jurek of AllMusic notes: "There is no doubt he is still a great singer, but his ability to throw his voice around and hit the higher notes in his baritone register is all but gone. With his more limited stylistic vernacular, however, Jones digs deep and gets the tunes across, making them swing and sway with emotion and honky tonk swagger." John Morthland of Amazon.com compliments Sherrill's production, writing that "Circuit-preacher’s son Billy Sherrill, who guided Jones’s 1970s commercial ascension, came out of retirement to produce these 24 songs (on two discs) and, especially for a guy accused back then of gussying up country too much, he forges an austere sound."

== Track listing ==
Disc one
No.	Title	Writer(s)	Length
1.	"Amazing Grace"	John Newton	3:23
2.	"It Is No Secret"	Stuart Hamblen	3:12
3.	"Just a Little Talk with Jesus"	Cleavant Derricks	2:11
4.	"Never Grow Old"	James Cleveland Moore, Sr.	3:19
5.	"Swing Low, Sweet Chariot"	Traditional	2:50
6.	"Why Me Lord?"	Kris Kristofferson	2:58
7.	"I'll Fly Away"	Albert E. Brumley	3:00
8.	"Precious Memories"	J. B. F. Wright	4:16
9.	"Just a Closer Walk with Thee"	Traditional	3:01
10.	"In the Garden"	C. Austin Miles, Johann Pachelbel	3:28
11.	"Lonesome Valley"	Traditional	3:39
12.	"When Mama Sang (The Angels Stopped to Listen)"	Danny Walls, Bob Warren	3:32

Disc two
No.	Title	Writer(s)	Length
1.	"Peace in the Valley"	Thomas A. Dorsey	3:26
2.	"What a Friend We Have in Jesus"	Charles Crozat Converse, Joseph M. Scriven	4:13
3.	"Softly and Tenderly"	Will Lamartine Thompson	3:08
4.	"The Lily of the Valley"	William Charles Fry, William Shakespeare Hays	2:35
5.	"The Old Rugged Cross"	George Bennard	3:13
6.	"Leaning on the Everlasting Arms"	Elisha Hoffman, Anthony Johnson Showalter	3:04
7.	"Family Bible"	Walt Breeland, Paul Buskirk, Claude Gray	3:33
8.	"Mansion Over the Hilltop"	Ira Stanphill	3:34
9.	"If I Could Hear My Mother Pray Again"	James Rowe, James W. Vaughan	3:19
10.	"How Beautiful Heaven Must Be"	A. P. Bland, A. S. Bridgewater	3:21
11.	"Jesus Hold My Hand"	Albert E. Brumley	3:31
12.	"I Know a Man Who Can"	Jack Campbell, Jimmie Davis	4:02
