= Trouble in Mind (George Jones album) =

Studio album by George Jones
- Released: January 26, 1966
- Genre: Country
- Length: 26:27
- Label: United Artists
- Producer: Pappy Daily

George Jones chronology
Old Brush Arbors (1965)	Trouble in Mind (1966)	Country Heart (1966)

Professional ratings
Review scores
Source	Rating
Record Mirror	3/5 stars

Trouble in Mind is a George Jones album released on the United Artists label in 1966. "Trouble in Mind" and "Worried Mind" had previously been released on the 1962 LP George Jones Sings Bob Wills, "Sometimes You Just Can't Win" had been previously released on the 1962 LP The New Favorites of George Jones, and "I Heard You Crying in Your Sleep" and "Take These Chains from My Heart" had been previously released on his 1962 LP My Favorites of Hank Williams. George Bedard of AllMusic wrote: "One of his best albums, there are sappy vocal choruses on some of the tunes, but they can't diminish George Jones. A few that don't - 'You Done Me Wrong' (written by him) and 'It's a Sin' - are among the best things he's ever recorded."

== Track listing ==
No.	Title	Writer(s)	Length
1.	"Trouble in Mind"	Richard M. Jones	2:04
2.	"You Done Me Wrong"	George Jones, Ray Price	2:05
3.	"It's A Sin"	Fred Rose, Zeb Turner	2:10
4.	"My Tears Are Overdue"	Freddie Hart	2:25
5.	"Brown to Blue"	George Jones	2:38
6.	"Lonesome Old Town"	George Jones	2:11
7.	"Worried Mind"	Worried Mind	2:14
8.	"I Heard You Crying in Your Sleep"	Hank Williams	2:10
9.	"Sometimes You Just Can't Win"	Smokey Stover	2:38
10.	"A Little Bitty Tear"	Hank Locklin	1:51
11.	"Take These Chains from My Heart"	Fred Rose, Hy Heath	2:20
12.	"Lonesome Life"	George Jones, George Riddle	2:36
