= Aching, Breaking Heart =

Single by George Jones

from the album George Jones Sings from the Heart
- B-side: "When My Heart Hurts No More"
- Released: 1962
- Recorded: 1961
- Genre: Country
- Length: 2:47
- Label: Mercury
- Songwriter(s): Rick Hall
- Producer(s): Pappy Daily

George Jones singles chronology
"Did I Ever Tell You" (1961)	"Aching, Breaking Heart" (1962)	"She Thinks I Still Care" (1962)

"Aching, Breaking Heart" is a song by George Jones. It was his last single on Mercury Records before moving to United Artists. The song peaked at number five on the Billboard country chart in March 1962. During his tenure with Starday and Mercury, Jones had amassed eleven top-ten hits, with "White Lightning" and "Tender Years" both topping the charts. However, Jones' producer and manager Pappy Daily had secured a more lucrative deal with UA. In the 1994 Mercury Jones retrospective, Cup of Loneliness: The Classic Mercury Years, Colin Escott notes, "Mercury lost George just as he was on the verge of ruling the charts. Art Talmadge had left Mercury Records and gone to United Artists and when George's Mercury contract expired at the end of 1961, Pappy took him to U.A. The first single, the classic "She Thinks I Still Care", was one of seven records George would chart in 1962."

"Achin', Breakin' Heart" was part of George's live show for years, as can be heard on the album Live at Dancetown, U.S.A.
