= Don Adams (country singer) =

American country music singer (1941–2026)

Don Adams (January 4, 1941 – February 1, 2026) was an American country music singer, who often supported George Jones such as on Live at Dancetown U.S.A. (1965). He also sang with Johnny Paycheck.

== Life and career ==
Adams was born in Ross County, Ohio, on January 4, 1941. He was part of a legendary family of country music singers and musicians. One of ten descendants of Frank Adams who himself, along with his brothers were radio and recording artists in the 1930s and 40s. Don Adams enjoyed moderate success as a solo artist recording on the Atlantic, Musicor, Jack O' Diamonds and Big D labels in the 1960s and 70s. He was most well known however as the lead singer of the Adams Brothers, a much sought after backing band for some of country music's largest stars. The Adams Brothers, Don, Gary and Arnie at various times were the traveling back-up band for artists such as Merle Haggard, Tammy Wynette, Ray Price, Marty Robbins and Johnny Paycheck. They were most well known however as the original backing band for George Jones where they were known as The Jones Boys. At one point, the band was such a fan favorite that Jones' label released an album titled simply "The Jones Boys" without George Jones.

While known as stellar musicians, the Adams Brothers also gained notoriety for their hard partying lifestyle, which fitted well considering their longest tours were typically with the notoriously hard partying Jones and Paycheck. The Adams Brothers have recently gained a resurgence in popularity with a new generation of music fans. When Hollywood producer Mike Judge (Beavis and Butthead, Silicon Valley) decided to do a mini-series for Cinemax in 2017 (Tales From the Tour Bus) featuring some of country music's most colorful characters, the Adams Brothers were featured in three of the episodes.

After retiring from the music industry, Adams along with his brothers, was occasionally coaxed out of retirement to do fundraisers and events for local charities. Their rare live shows attracted large crowds of classic country music fans.

Adams was frequently mistaken for the Get Smart actor Don Adams, and Jack O'Diamonds Records received requests for the actor to sing the country singer's hit "Two of the Usual" on the Get Smart show. In later years Adams was also confused with the Munich-based R&B singer Don Adams from the German production of the musical Hair.

Adams died in Greenfield on February 1, 2026, at the age of 85.

== Discography ==
Don Adams On His Way album October 1973 Atlantic SF-7280

1. I'll Be Satisfied
2. Manhattan, Kansas
3. Worst Of Luck
4. All For The Love Of A Girl
5. Oh What A Future She Had
6. Hold Back Tomorrow
7. I've Already Stayed Too Long
8. Drink A Dance And An Old Love Song
9. Daydream
10. It Keeps Right On A 'Hurtin'
11. The Way I'm Needing You
12. I Just Lost My Favorite Girl.
