= Country Heart =

Compilation album by George Jones
- Released: 1966
- Genre: Country
- Label: Musicor

George Jones chronology
Trouble In Mind (George Jones album) (1966)	Country Heart (1966)	Love Bug (1966)

Country Heart is an album by American country music artist George Jones. It was released in 1966 as a double LP on the Musicor Records label, and was available exclusively through the Columbia Record Club.

== Reception ==
Professional ratings
Review scores
Source	Rating
Allmusic	2/5 stars

AllMusic's Jim Worbois, while lamenting that a full version of "The Race Is On" is not featured, writes that the set "easily shows why George Jones has long been considered the finest singer in country music."

== Track listing ==
1. "Four-O-Thirty-Three" (Earl Montgomery)
2. "Let a Little Loving Come In" (Leon Payne)
3. "How Proud I Would Have Been" (Joe Poovey)
4. "We're Watching Our Step" (E. Montgomery)
5. "Old Brush Arbors" (Orbie Ardis, Darrell Edwards)
6. "The Race Is On" (Instrumental)
7. "Take Me" (George Jones, Payne)
8. "Ship of Love" (Leroy Griffin)
9. "I Can't Get Used to Being Lonely" (E. Montgomery)
10. "Walk Through This World with Me" (Kay Savage, Sandra Seamons)
11. "Flowers for Mama" (Eddie Noack, Al Rumley, Cindy Walker)
12. "We Must Have Been Out of Our Minds" (with Melba Montgomery) (E. Montgomery)
13. "Things Have Gone to Pieces" (Payne)
14. "If You Believe" (Darrell Edwards)
15. "Gonna Take Me Away from You"
16. "Till I Hear It from You" (Jones, Jack Ripley)
17. "I'm Wasting Good Paper" (E. Montgomery)
18. "White Lightning" (J.P. Richardson)
19. "From Here to the Door" (Don Chapel)
20. "Don't Keep Me Lonely Too Long" (Melba Montgomery)
21. "Sea Between Our Hearts"
22. "Developing My Pictures" (E. Montgomery)
23. "I Just Lost My Favorite Girl"
24. "Selfishness of Man" (Payne)
