= Time Changes Everything (song) =

Single by Bob Wills and His Texas Playboys
- B-side: "That Brownskin Gal"
- Released: September 1940
- Recorded: April 15, 1940
- Studio: Burrus Sawmill Studio, Saginaw, Texas
- Genre: Western swing
- Label: Okeh 5753
- Songwriter: Tommy Duncan

Bob Wills and His Texas Playboys singles chronology
"New San Antonio Rose" (1940)	"Time Changes Everything" (1940)	"Big Beaver" (1941)

"Time Changes Everything" is a Western swing standard with words and music written by Tommy Duncan, the long-time vocalist with Bob Wills and his Texas Playboys. Written as a ballad, the lyrics tell of a failed romance and of the hurt that has healed. Each verse ends with the phrase "Time changes everything".

== Recording and legacy ==
The Texas Playboys recorded "Time Changes Everything" during an April 15, 1940, recording session in Saginaw, Texas. It was first released on the OKeh label, and has been reissued many times. (05753). It became one of the top singles that year. Artists ranging from Roy Rogers (Decca 5908, 1940, with Spade Cooley on fiddle) to Woody Herman and His Orchestra (Decca 3751, 1941) soon brought out competing records. The Roy Rogers version reached number four on Billboard's "Hillbilly...Hits" chart in October, 1941.

The Playboys recorded another version on July 1, 1960, in Hollywood, California. This version was also released on many labels. In 1968 yet another version was recorded in Nashville with J. Preston doing the vocal.

It has been recorded numerous times since, including on tribute albums by George Jones (George Jones Sings Bob Wills), Ray Price (Ray Price Sings San Antonio Rose), and Merle Haggard (A Tribute to the Best Damn Fiddle Player in the World (or, My Salute to Bob Wills)).

== Bibliography ==
- Kriebel, Robert C. Blue Flame: Woody Herman's Life in Music. Purdue University Press, 1995. ISBN 1-55753-073-4
- White, Raymond E. King of the Cowboys, Queen of the West: Roy Rogers and Dale Evans. Popular Press, 2006. ISBN 0-299-21004-9
