= George Jones Sings from the Heart =

Sings from the Heart

Studio album by George Jones
- Released: July 1962
- Recorded: April 21, 1957 – February 8, 1961
- Studio: Bradley Studios, Nashville
- Genre: Country
- Length: 30:15
- Label: Mercury
- Producer: Shelby Singleton

George Jones chronology
Sings Country and Western Hits (1961)	Sings from the Heart (1962)	The Fabulous Country Music Sound (1962)

Singles from Sings From the Heart
- 1. "Hearts in My Dreams" Released: August 26, 1957; 2. "Candy Hearts (b-side)" Released: June 20, 1960; 3. "Cold, Cold Heart (b-side)" Released: July 14, 1962; 4. "Aching, Breaking Heart" Released: January 6, 1962; 5. "Tender Years" Released: June 5, 1961; 6. "When My Heart Hurts No More (b-side)" Released: January 6, 1962

Sings from the Heart is the 1962 country music studio album released by George Jones in June 1962. The album was his eleventh studio LP release, and was his last with Mercury, after switching to United Artists in late 1961. The album's theme was listing of songs about the heart, and contains his last #1 with Mercury Records from 1961, Tender Years.

The LP release was Jones' fourth studio release during the 1960s, and lists many of his last recordings with Mercury, after five years on the label.

== Reception ==
Professional ratings
Review scores
Source	Rating
Allmusic	3/5 stars

The album was received well by critics, and even sold well. Tender Years later became the most well known song on the album. In 1984, Jones biographer Bob Allen wrote that "The manner in which he sang the words to 'Tender Years' (which, in mid-1961, became his second number one single) was, in fact, just about enough to make the short hairs stand up on the back of one's head." In 1994, country music historian Colin Escott agreed, writing that the song "just about defined the territory he carved out as his own in the years ahead...the song, the production, and the performance came together in a statement of soon-to-be classic George Jones."

== Track listing ==
Side One
No.	Title	Writer(s)	Length
1.	"Aching, Breaking Heart"	Rick Hall	2:48
2.	"Hearts in My Dream"	George Jones, Roger Miller	2:39
3.	"Candy Hearts"	Darrell Edwards, Herbie Treece	2:31
4.	"Talk to Me Lonesome Heart"	James O'Gwynn	2:19
5.	"With Half a Heart"	Leon Payne	2:23
6.	"Heartaches by the Number"	Harlan Howard	2:36

Side Two
No.	Title	Writer(s)	Length
1.	"When My Heart Hurts No More"	Edwards, Hugh Cross	2:05
2.	"Cold, Cold Heart"	Hank Williams	3:21
3.	"I've Got a New Heartache"	Ray Price, Wayne Walker	2:05
4.	"Gotta Talk to Your Heart"	Jones, Miller	2:19
5.	"Frozen Heart"	Jones, Jimmy Yancey	2:12
6.	"Tender Years"	Jones, Edwards	2:27
