= Burn Your Playhouse Down =

Burn Your Playhouse Down – The Unreleased Duets

Studio album by George Jones
- Released: August 19, 2008
- Recorded: February 24, 1977 – August 28, 2006
- Genre: Country
- Length: 41:03
- Label: Bandit Records
- Producer: Brian Ahern; Billy Sherrill; Keith Stegall

George Jones chronology
Kickin' Out the Footlights...Again (2006)	Burn Your Playhouse Down – The Unreleased Duets (2008)

Professional ratings
Review scores
Source	Rating
Allmusic	2/5 stars
Engine 145	2.5/5 stars

Burn Your Playhouse Down – The Unreleased Duets is the 60th and final studio album by American country music singer George Jones released on August 19, 2008 on the Bandit Records label. It features duets never before released, including some that were cut from his 1994 duets album The Bradley Barn Sessions. The only new recording in the collection is "You And Me And Time", a song Jones recorded with his daughter by Tammy Wynette, Georgette. A music video accompanied the song. The album features several duets with artist from outside the country music pantheon, including Mark Knopfler, Leon Russell, and Keith Richards. The album peaked at number 15 on the Billboard country albums chart. Of the album's title track, Andrew Meuller of Uncut opined in July 2013, "The segue from Richards trying to sing like Jones to Jones actually singing like Jones is hilarious."

== Track listing ==
No.	Title	Writer(s)	Duet partner	Length
1.	"You and Me and Time"	Mark McGuinn, Don Pfrimmer, Georgette Jones	Georgette Jones	4:53
2.	"Window Up Above"	George Jones	Leon Russell	3:22
3.	"She Once Lived Here"	Autry Inman	Ricky Skaggs	3:03
4.	"Rockin' Years"	Floyd Parton	Dolly Parton	3:22
5.	"Burn Your Playhouse Down"	Lester Blackwell	Keith Richards	2:53
6.	"Selfishness in Man"	Leon Payne	Vince Gill	3:37
7.	"Tavern Choir"	Doodle Owens, Dennis Knutson	Jim Lauderdale	3:04
8.	"I Always Get It Right with You"	Joe Allen, Charlie Williams	Shelby Lynne	3:41
9.	"When the Grass Grows Over Me"	Don Chapel	Mark Chesnutt	3:46
10.	"I Always Get Lucky with You"	Gary Church, Freddy Powers, Tex Whitson	Mark Knopfler	3:14
11.	"You're Still on My Mind"	Luke McDaniel	Marty Stuart	3:04
12.	"Lovin' You, Lovin' Me"	Sonny Throckmorton	Tammy Wynette	3:04

== Personnel ==
- Brian Ahern – acoustic guitar, electric guitar
- Joe Babcock – background vocals
- Eddie Bayers – drums
- Richard Bennett – acoustic guitar
- Pete Bordonali – electric guitar
- James Burton – electric guitar
- Jimmy Capps – acoustic guitar
- Jerry Carrigan – drums
- Mark Casstevens – acoustic guitar
- Mark Chesnutt – duet vocals on "When the Grass Grows Over Me"
- Jerry Douglas – Dobro
- Delores Egdin – background vocals
- Paul Franklin – steel guitar
- Vince Gill – acoustic guitar, electric guitar, and duet vocals on "Selfishness in Man"
- Owen Hale – drums
- Glen D. Hardin – piano
- Emmylou Harris – acoustic guitar
- Randy Howard – mandolin
- John Hughey – steel guitar
- David Hungate – bass guitar
- John Jennings – electric guitar
- Wendy Suits Johnson – background vocals
- George Jones – lead vocals
- Georgette Jones – duet vocals on "You and Me and Time"
- Glenn Keener – electric guitar
- Shane Keister – keyboards
- Jerry Kennedy – electric guitar
- Mark Knopfler – electric guitar and duet vocals on "I Always Get Lucky with You"
- Jim Lauderdale – duet vocals on "Tavern Choir"
- Shelby Lynne – duet vocals on "I Always Get It Right with You"
- Mac McAnally – acoustic guitar
- Terry McMillan – harmonica
- Kenny Malone – drums
- Brent Mason – electric guitar
- Weldon Myrick – steel guitar
- Louis Dean Nunley – background vocals
- Jennifer O'Brien – background vocals
- Mark O'Connor – fiddle
- Clifford Parker – electric guitar
- Dolly Parton – duet vocals on "Rockin' Years"
- Dave Pomeroy – bass guitar
- Keith Richards – electric guitar and duet vocals on "Burn Your Playhouse Down"
- Hargus "Pig" Robbins – piano
- Brent Rowan – electric guitar
- Leon Russell – piano and duet vocals on "Window Up Above"
- Billy Sanford – electric guitar
- Dale Sellers – electric guitar
- Billy Sherrill – keyboards
- Ricky Skaggs – fiddle, acoustic guitar, and duet vocals on "She Once Lived Her"
- Buddy Spicher – fiddle
- Tommy Spurlock – steel guitar
- Harry Stinson – drums
- Henry Strzelecki – bass guitar
- Marty Stuart – electric slide guitar, mandolin, and duet vocals on "You're Still on My Mind"
- Jim Vest – steel guitar
- Bergen White – string arrangements
- John Willis – acoustic guitar
- Bobby Wood – keyboards
- Glenn Worf – upright bass
- Bob Wray – bass guitar
- Tammy Wynette – duet vocals on "Lovin' Me, Lovin' You"
