= George Jones & The Smoky Mountain Boys =

Studio album by George Jones
- Released: February 17, 2017
- Genre: Honky Tonk, Traditional Country & Nashville Sound/Countrypolitan
- Label: Universal Music LLC

George Jones chronology
Burn Your Playhouse Down (2008)	George Jones & The Smoky Mountain Boys (2017)	The Lost Nashville Sessions (2024)

George Jones & The Smoky Mountain Boys is a studio album by American country music artists George Jones and The Smoky Mountain Boys, who served as Roy Acuff's long-time backing band.

== Background ==
The album was recorded in one session in the early 1970s but had remained unreleased. In the liner notes writer Bill Bentley states, "Finding these tapes now is like discovering a long-lost script that offers secrets from a long gone world. The dozen selections are a peek into a precious freedom, and what a true pioneer can do when the music calls out to them. George Jones recorded more albums than just about any other country singer, but he never made one like this. This is the sound of music played by people who lived their lives serving the true spirit, and sung by a man who walked this world only once." The album is composed of country classics, several of them composed by Acuff, who was a profound musical influence on Jones. As Jones biographer Rich Kienzle observes, Acuff and his Smoky Mountain Boys "had an unforgettable dynamic: his fiddling and rough-edged, deeply emotional vocals were accompanied by a raw, traditional string ensemble.” In a 2006 interview with Ray Waddell of Billboard, Jones stated, "I loved Roy Acuff with all my heart, and I never dreamed I'd be able to meet him or see him onstage, or especially become good friends with him." Acuff duets with Jones on his signature song “Wabash Cannonball.”

== Track listing ==
No.	Title	Writer(s)	Length
1.	"Low and Lonely"	Floyd Jenkins	2:20
2.	"Blue Eyes Crying in the Rain"	Fred Rose	3:02
3.	"Branded Wherever I Go"	Roy Acuff	1:59
4.	"We Live in Two Different Worlds"	A.P. Carter	2:36
5.	"Beneath That Lonely Mound of Clay"	Acuff	2:50
6.	"The Precious Jewel"	Acuff	2:55
7.	"Wabash Cannonball"	Carter	2:00
8.	"The Great Speckled Bird"	Guy Smith	3:13
9.	"Don't Make Me Go to Bed and I'll Be Good"	Hugh Cross	4:34
10.	"The Great Judgement Morning"	R.E. Winsett	3:43
11.	"Wreck on the Highway"	Dorsey Dixon	2:32
12.	"Night Train to Memphis"	Owen Bradley/Marvin Hughes/Beasley Smith	2:18

== Personnel ==
- Design: Jimmy Hole
- Executive Producer: Gary Paczosa
- Liner notes: Bill Bentley
- Mastering: Paul Blakemore
- Mixing: Shani Gandhi
