= The Great Speckled Bird (song) =

Song by Roy Acuff
- Recorded: 1936
- Songwriter: Charlie Swain

"The Great Speckled Bird" is a hymn from the Southern United States whose lyrics were written by the Reverend Guy Smith and transcribed by singer Charlie Swain. It is an allegory referencing fundamentalist self-perception during the Fundamentalist–Modernist Controversy. The song is in the form of AA, with each section being eight bars in a two-beat meter (either 2/4 or 2/2), with these 16 bars forming the musical background for each verse. It is based on Jeremiah 12:9, "Mine heritage is unto me as a speckled bird, the birds round about are against her; come ye, assemble all the beasts of the field, come to devour." It was recorded in 1936 by Roy Acuff. It was also later recorded by Johnny Cash and Kitty Wells (both in 1959), Pearly Brown (1961), Hank Locklin (1962), Marty Robbins (1966), Lucinda Williams (1978), Marion Williams, and Jerry Lee Lewis. George Jones & The Smoky Mountain Boys also recorded it in the early 1970s (although that recording was not released until 2017).

The tune is the same apparently traditional melody used in the songs "Thrills That I Can't Forget", recorded by Welby Toomey and Edgar Boaz for Gennett in 1925, and the song "I'm Thinking Tonight of My Blue Eyes," originally recorded by the Carter Family for Victor in 1929. The same melody was later used in the 1952 country hit "The Wild Side of Life" sung by Hank Thompson and the "answer song" performed by Kitty Wells called "It Wasn't God Who Made Honky Tonk Angels" in the same year. A notable instrumental version is found on the Grammy Award-nominated album 20th Century Gospel by Nokie Edwards and the Light Crust Doughboys on Greenhaw Records.

The connection between these songs is noted in the David Allan Coe song "If That Ain't Country" that ends with the lyrics "I'm thinking tonight of my blue eyes/ Concerning a great speckled bird/ I didn't know God made honky-tonk angels/ and went back to the wild side of life."

The song is also referenced, and portions of the melody-line are used, in "When the Silver Eagle Meets the Great Speckled Bird" by Porter Wagoner.

Billy Joe Shaver mentions the song in his hymn "Jesus Christ, What a Man."

"Something to Love", by Jason Isbell and the 400 Unit references the song when speaking of learning music: "They taught me how to make the chords and sing the words. I'm still singing like that great speckled bird."

Both the song "The Great Speckled Bird" and the passage from Jeremiah may be a poetic description of mobbing behavior.

== See also ==
- Great Speckled Bird (band)
