= Joe Carson (musician) =

American country music performer

Joe Carson (born Joe Franklin Carson in Holliday, Texas; 21 November 1936) was an American country music performer, active from the early 1950s to early 1960s. He died in an auto accident at the age of 27, on 28 February 1964.

== Life and career ==
Also known as Little Joe Carson, he was a songwriter as well, writing many of his own songs; some of his songs were recorded by other artists such as "The Heart You Could Have Had" (Wanda Jackson) and "Time Lock" (George Jones). In the 1960s Carson recorded on the Liberty record label, with Tommy Allsup as producer (Joe Carson was a member of Allsup's band the Southernaires in Lawton OK in the 1950s). These releases include the first (and for several years only) version of the Willie Nelson-penned "I Gotta Get Drunk (And I Shore Do Dread It)", which reached #27 on Billboard's Hot Country chart in 1963. Carson's highest-charting release was "Helpless" which reached #19. According to legend, the last song Carson performed was the Allison-Curtis anti-Nashville tune "The Last Song (I'm Ever Gonna Sing)". After Joe Carson's death, producer Allsup put together an album of several of Carson's Liberty recordings; the album was released as In Memoriam.
