= T'ain't Nothin' to Me =

Single by The Coasters

from the album Apollo Saturday Night
- B-side: "Speedo's Back in Town"
- Released: February 15, 1964
- Recorded: November 16, 1963
- Genre: R&B
- Length: 4:19
- Label: Atco 6287
- Songwriter: Pat Patterson
- Producers: Nesuhi Ertegun, Jerry Wexler

The Coasters singles chronology
"The P.T.A." (1963)	"T'ain't Nothin' to Me" (1964)	"Bad Detective" (1964)

"T'ain't Nothin' to Me" is a song written by Pat Patterson (a pseudonym of Leon Payne) and performed by The Coasters. The song reached #20 on the R&B chart and #64 on the Billboard Hot 100 in 1964. The song appeared on the 1964 album, Apollo Saturday Night.

The song was produced by Nesuhi Ertegun and Jerry Wexler and arranged by King Curtis.

The song was recorded live on November 16, 1963 at the Apollo Theater in New York City, New York.

The Coasters' version was neither the first nor the last popular version of the song, originally released as "It's Nothing To Me" (Loy Clingman in 1957), and later as "Ain't Nothing to Me" (Johnny Winter, 1973). Modern coverers include Billy Strings and The Sadies.
