= Hits I Missed...And One I Didn't =

Studio album by George Jones
- Released: September 13, 2005
- Genre: Country
- Length: 40:09
- Label: Bandit Records
- Producer: Keith Stegall

George Jones chronology
The Gospel Collection (2003)	Hits I Missed...And One I Didn't (2005)	God's Country: George Jones and Friends (2006)

Professional ratings
Review scores
Source	Rating
Allmusic	link

Hits I Missed...And One I Didn't is the 59th studio album by American country music singer George Jones, released in 2005.

It was rated three out of five stars by AllMusic.

== Track listing ==
No.	Title	Writer(s)	Length
1.	"Funny How Time Slips Away"	Willie Nelson	4:05
2.	"Detroit City"	Danny Dill, Mel Tillis	2:55
3.	"The Blues Man" (With Dolly Parton)	Hank Williams, Jr.	4:32
4.	"Here in the Real World"	Mark Irwin, Alan Jackson	3:40
5.	"If You're Gonna Do Me Wrong (Do It Right)"	Max D. Barnes, Vern Gosdin	3:19
6.	"Today I Started Loving You Again"	Merle Haggard, Bonnie Owens	2:37
7.	"On the Other Hand"	Paul Overstreet, Don Schlitz	3:05
8.	"Pass Me By"	H. B. Hall	3:07
9.	"Skip a Rope"	Jack Moran, Glenn Tubb	2:54
10.	"Too Cold at Home"	Bobby Harden	3:40
11.	"Busted"	Harlan Howard	2:48
12.	"He Stopped Loving Her Today"	Bobby Braddock, Curly Putman	3:21

== Personnel ==
- Eddie Bayers – drums
- Sheri Copeland – backing vocals
- Larry Franklin – fiddle, mandolin
- Paul Franklin – pedal steel guitar, resonator guitar
- George Jones – vocals
- Liana Manis – backing vocals
- Brent Mason – electric guitar
- Dolly Parton – duet vocals on "The Blues Man"
- Hargus "Pig" Robbins – piano
- John Wesley Ryles – backing vocals
- Marty Slayton – backing vocals
- Rhonda Vincent – backing vocals
- Bruce Watkins – acoustic guitar
- Glenn Worf – bass guitar
