= George Jones Sings the Songs of Dallas Frazier =

Sings the Songs of Dallas Frazier

Studio album by George Jones
- Released: 1968
- Genre: Country
- Length: 23:57
- Label: Musicor
- Producer: Pappy Daily

George Jones chronology
Walk Through This World with Me (1967)	Sings the Songs of Dallas Frazier (1968)	If My Heart Had Windows (1968)

Singles from Sings the Songs of Dallas Frazier
- 1. "I Can't Get There from Here" Released: April 11, 1967

Sings the Songs of Dallas Frazier is the twenty-sixth studio album by American country music artist George Jones. It was released in 1968 on the Musicor Records label.

Sings the Songs of Dallas Frazier reached number 14 on the country albums chart while the album's opening track, "I Can't Get There From Here", would rise to number five on the country singles chart.

== Reception ==
Professional ratings
Review scores
Source	Rating
Allmusic	4.5/5 stars

Writing for AllMusic, Chris Woodstra contends that "while the big production numbers, complete with back-up by the Jordanaires, may put off some country purists, the album serves as a true testament to both the singer and the songwriter."

== Track listing ==
All tracks composed by Dallas Frazier

No.	Title	Length
1.	"I Can't Get There from Here"	2:25
2.	"Looking for My Feel Good"	2:14
3.	"When Love Was Green"	2:12
4.	"Hangin' On to One (And Hangin' Round the Other)"	2:25
5.	"Half of Me Is Gone"	2:37
6.	"The Honky Tonk Downstairs"	2:29
7.	"My Baby Left Her Jinglin' John (For Foldin' Fred)"	2:33
8.	"The Girl I Almost Knew"	2:44
9.	"There Ain't No Grave Deep Enough"	2:04
10.	"There's Nothing Left for You"	2:14

== Charts ==
Chart (1973)	Peak position
US Top Country Albums (Billboard)	14

== Charting Singles ==
Single	Chart	Peak position
I Can't Get There From Here	U.S. Billboard Hot Country Singles	5
