= We Found Heaven Right Here on Earth at "4033" =

Studio album by George Jones
- Released: October 24, 1966
- Genre: Country
- Length: 23:43
- Label: Musicor
- Producer: Pappy Daily

George Jones chronology
I'm a People (1966)	We Found Heaven Right Here on Earth at "4033" (1966)	Walk Through This World with Me (1967)

Professional ratings
Review scores
Source	Rating
Allmusic	3.5/5 stars

We Found Heaven Right Here on Earth at "4033" is an album by American country music artist George Jones released in 1966 on the Musicor Records label. The album features "Walk Through This World With Me", which would become a number one hit for Jones in 1967, his first chart topper in five years.

This album contains the original version of Walk Through This World with Me, with a backing chorus by The Jordanaires repeating some of his verses. Jones re-recorded it on November 30, 1966, without the repeated verses, and released it as a single in January 1967 and included it as the title track on his 1967 album of the same name.

== Track listing ==
No.	Title	Writer(s)	Length
1.	"Four-O-Thirty Three"	Earl Montgomery	2:28
2.	"From Here to the Door"	Don Chapel	2:38
3.	""Back Into My Baby's Arms Again"	Dallas Frazier, A. L. Owens	2:00
4.	"Ain't Nothin' Shakin' (But the Leaves)"	Dallas Frazier, A. L. Owens	2:05
5.	"In Person"	Lynn Anderson	2:30
6.	"Developing My Picture"	Earl Montgomery	2:15
7.	"Please Don't Let That Woman Get Me"	Dallas Frazier	2:06
8.	"Walk Through This World with Me"	Kay Savage, Sandra Seamons	2:30
9.	"Your Steppin' Stone"	Bozo Darnell, Major Luper	3:02
10.	"Don't Keep Me Lonely Too Long"	Melba Montgomery	2:37

== Personnel ==
- The Jordanaires – vocal accompaniment

== Chart Performance ==
=== Album ===
Chart (1965)	Peak position
US Top Country Albums (Billboard)	3

=== Singles ===
Single	Chart	Peak position
Four-O-Thirty Three	U.S. Billboard Hot Country Singles	5
