= George Jones Sings Bob Wills =

Studio album by George Jones
- Released: December 1962
- Genre: Country
- Length: 26:27
- Label: United Artists
- Producer: Pappy Daily

George Jones chronology
Sings from the Heart (1962)	George Jones Sings Bob Wills (1962)	Homecoming in Heaven (1962)

George Jones Sings Bob Wills is an album by American country music artist George Jones. It was released in 1962 on the United Artists Records.

== Reception ==
Professional ratings
Review scores
Source	Rating
Allmusic	4/5 stars

Stephen Thomas Erlewine of AllMusic gives George Jones Sings Bob Wills a glowing review, noting "Where some Wills tributes are faithful to a fault, Jones, as produced by Pappy Daily, plays these songs as hardcore honky tonk, occasionally informed by Western swing, but only as a coloring device. He is singing these songs in his signature pure country style, and the results are pretty terrific, not only because this is the hardest country he cut at United Artists, fueled by a crackerjack band playing at its peak, but because these are tremendous songs that are open to such a sly reinterpretation as given to them by Jones and Daily." In his 1994 article "The Devil in George Jones", Nick Tosches singled out Jones's singing on "Warm Red Wine" for particular praise: "the pure, stark sincerity with which he delivered the lament 'I'm a prisoner of drink who will never escape' that was uncommonly disquieting. It was more than a testimony to the power of his singing; it seemed a personal testament, a wail from the abyss, as well."

== Track listing ==
No.	Title	Writer(s)	Length
1.	"Bubbles in My Beer"	Tommy Duncan, Cindy Walker, Bob Wills	2:20
2.	"Faded Love"	Johnnie Lee Wills, Wills	2:39
3.	"Roly Poly"	Fred Rose	1:52
4.	"Trouble in Mind"	Richard M. Jones	2:06
5.	"Take Me Back to Tulsa"	Duncan, Wills	1:56
6.	"The Warm Red Wine"	Walker	2:53
7.	"Time Changes Everything"	Duncan	2:54
8.	"Worried Mind"	Ted Daffan, Jimmie Davis	2:19
9.	"Silver Dew on the Bluegrass Tonight"	Ed Burt	2:23
10.	"San Antonio Rose"	Willis	2:47
11.	"Steel Guitar Rag"	Leon McAuliffe, Cliffie Stone, Merle Travis	2:36
12.	"Big Beaver"	Willis	2:50
