= Love Bug (George Jones album) =

Studio album by George Jones
- Released: 1966
- Genre: Country
- Label: Musicor
- Producer: Pappy Daily

George Jones chronology
Country Heart (1966)	Love Bug (1966)	I'm a People (1966)

Professional ratings
Review scores
Source	Rating
Allmusic	4/5 stars

Love Bug is an album by American country music singer George Jones. It was released in 1966 on the Musicor Records label.

The album mostly features songs made famous by other artists, such as Dave Dudley, Roger Miller, and Merle Haggard. It reached number seven on the country album chart.

== Track listing ==
No.	Title	Writer(s)	Length
1.	"Love Bug"	Wayne Kemp, Curtis Wayne	2:00
2.	"Six Days on the Road"	Earl Green, Carl Montgomery	2:27
3.	"The Bridge Washed Out"	Mel Melshee, Jimmy Louis, Sandra Smith, Slim Williamson	2:32
4.	"Talk Back Trembling Lips"	John D. Loudermilk	2:29
5.	"Don't Let Me Cross Over"	Penny Jay	2:29
6.	"Blue Side of Lonesome"	Leon Payne	2:44
7.	"Take Me"	Payne, Jones	2:40
8.	"Don't Be Angry"	Wade Jackson	2:43
9.	"Unfaithful One"	J.M. Lyne	2:07
10.	"King of the Road"	Roger Miller	2:29
11.	"All My Friends Are Gonna Be Strangers"	Liz Anderson	2:22
12.	"Things Have Gone to Pieces"	Payne	2:52

== Chart performance ==
Chart (1966)	Peak position
US Top Country Albums (Billboard)	7

== Charting Singles ==
Single	Chart	Peak position
Love Bug	U.S. Billboard Hot Country Singles	6
Yake Me	U.S. Billboard Hot Country Singles	8
