= George Jones Sings Like the Dickens! =

George Jones Sings Like The Dickens!

Studio album by George Jones
- Released: 1964
- Recorded: June 1964
- Studio: Columbia (Nashville, Tennessee)
- Genre: Country
- Length: 31:02
- Label: United Artists
- Producer: Pappy Daily

George Jones chronology
Heartaches & Tears (1964)	George Jones Sings Like The Dickens! (1964)	I Get Lonely in a Hurry (1964)

George Jones Sings Like The Dickens! is an album by American country music artist George Jones released in 1964 on United Artists Records, his last album with that label. It is tribute to the music of Little Jimmy Dickens.

== Track listing ==
No.	Title	Writer(s)	Length
1.	"It Scares Me Half to Death"	Joe Allison, Audrey Allison	2:40
2.	"A Rose from a Bride's Bouquet"	Kerry Kurt Phillips, Clark Van Ness	2:20
3.	"When Your House Is Not a Home"	Roger Miller	2:43
4.	"I'm Just Blue Enough"	Charlie Louvin, Ira Louvin	2:39
5.	"We Could"	Boudleaux Bryant	2:42
6.	"Take Me as I Am (Or Let Me Go)"	Boudleaux Bryant	2:27
7.	"Where Did the Sunshine Go?"	Felice Bryant, Boudleaux Bryant	2:20
8.	"Making the Rounds"	Boudleaux Bryant	2:48
9.	"I've Just Got to See You Once More"	James Dickens, Billy Wallace	2:27
10.	"Lovin' Lies"	Dorothy Chapman, Troy Martin, Pete Pyle	2:35
11.	"Just When I Needed You"	Johnny Wright, Jack Anglin, Clyde Baum	2:27
12.	"My Heart's Bouquet"	James Dickens, J. Gordon Hall	2:35

== Chart performance ==
Chart	Peak position
US Top Country Albums (Billboard)	6

== Reception ==
Professional ratings
Review scores
Source	Rating
Allmusic	3/5 stars
