= Blue & Lonesome (George Jones album) =

Compilation album by George Jones
- Released: February 1964
- Genre: Country
- Label: Mercury
- Producer: Pappy Daily, Shelby Singleton

George Jones chronology
I Wish Tonight Would Never End (1963)	Blue & Lonesome (1964)	Heartaches & Tears (1964)

Professional ratings
Review scores
Source	Rating
AllMusic	link

Blue & Lonesome is a compilation album by American country music artist George Jones released in 1964 on the Mercury Records label.

== Reception ==
Thom Jurek of AllMusic calls Blue & Lonesome "an excellent portrait of Jones' transition. He was well on his way to becoming the great singer of broken love songs and honky tonk ballads from the rockabilly and hillbilly singer of his youth, and these tune prove it."

== Track listing ==
No.	Title	Writer(s)	Length
1.	"Oh Lonesome Me"	Don Gibson	2:28
2.	"Life to Go"	George Jones	2:18
3.	"Just Little Boy Blue"	Jimmie Fox	2:08
4.	"Cup of Loneliness"	Jones, Burl Stephens	2:39
5.	"Nobody's Lonesome for Me"	Hank Williams	2:05
6.	"There'll Be No Teardrops Tonight"	Hank Williams	2:40
7.	"Color of the Blues"	Jones, Lawton Williams	2:50
8.	"Go Away with Me"	Jones	1:44
9.	"Talk to Me Lonesome Heart"	James O'Gwynn	2:18
10.	"If You've Got the Money, I've Got the Time"	Lefty Frizzell, Jim Beck	2:04
11.	"Singing the Blues"	Melvin Endsley	1:58
12.	"Don't Stop the Music"	Jones	2:10

== Charts ==
Chart (1964)	Peak position
US Top Country Albums (Billboard)	11

== Personnel ==
- Grady Martin, Jerry Kennedy, Hank Garland, Harold Bradley – guitar
- Buddy Emmons, Jimmy Day – steel guitar
- Bob Moore – bass
- Buddy Harman – drums
- Tommy Jackson, Rufus Thibodeaux – fiddle
- Floyd Cramer, Hargus "Pig" Robbins – piano
