= The Rock: Stone Cold Country 2001 =

Studio album by George Jones
- Released: September 11, 2001
- Genre: Country
- Length: 36:56
- Label: Bandit/BNA
- Producer: Emory Gordy, Jr., Allen Reynolds, Keith Stegall

George Jones chronology
Cold Hard Truth (1999)	The Rock: Stone Cold Country 2001 (2001)	The Gospel Collection (2003)

The Rock: Stone Cold Country 2001 is the 57th studio album by American country music singer George Jones, released on September 11, 2001 on the Bandit Records label.

== Content ==
The lead single was "Beer Run (B Double E Double Are You In?)", a duet with Garth Brooks that was also found on his 2001 album Scarecrow. Significant tracks include "50,000 Names", written and originally recorded by Jamie O'Hara as a tribute to fallen soldiers of the Vietnam War, and "Tramp On Your Street", which marks the first time a Billy Joe Shaver song appeared on a Jones album. "What I Didn't Do" had been previously recorded by Steve Wariner.

Professional ratings
Review scores
Source	Rating
Allmusic	link

== Track listing ==
No.	Title	Writer(s)	Length
1.	"The Rock"	Russell Smith, Jim Varsos	3:24
2.	"Beer Run (B Double E Double Are You In?)" (featuring Garth Brooks)	Keith Anderson, Kent Blazy, George Ducas, Kim Williams, Amanda Williams	3:04
3.	"Wood and Wire"	Kenny Beard, Michael Mahler	3:49
4.	"50,000 Names"	Jamie O'Hara	3:50
5.	"The Man He Was"	Harley Allen, John Wiggins	2:51
6.	"I Got Everything"	Al Anderson, Jim Hoke	3:13
7.	"Half Over You"	Karen Staley	3:31
8.	"I Am"	Stewart Harris, Curtis Wright	3:06
9.	"Honey Hush"	Dean Dillon	3:33
10.	"Around Here"	Richard Fagan, Jeff Moore	2:35
11.	"What I Didn't Do"	Wood Newton, Michael Noble	3:46
12.	"Tramp on Your Street"	Billy Joe Shaver	4:14

== Personnel ==
Adapted from The Rock liner notes.

=== On all tracks except 2, 3, 6, 11 ===
Musicians

- Monisa Angell - viola
- Eddie Bayers - drums
- Richard Bennett - electric guitar
- Bruce Christensen - viola
- Stuart Duncan - fiddle, mandolin
- Paul Franklin - steel guitar
- Steve Gibson - acoustic guitar, electric guitar
- Emory Gordy Jr. - bass guitar
- Gerald Greer - violin
- Connie Heard - violin
- John Hobbs - piano, Hammond B-3 organ
- John Hughey - steel guitar
- Carl Jackson - background vocals
- Anthony LaMarchina - cello
- Patty Loveless - background vocals
- Liana Manis - background vocals
- Brent Mason - electric guitar
- Kathryn Plummer - viola
- Mike Rojas - keyboards
- John Wesley Ryles - background vocals
- Lisa Silver - background vocals
- Pamela Sixfin - violin
- Chris Teal - violin
- Gary VanOsdale - viola
- Biff Watson - acoustic guitar
- John Wiggins - background vocals
- Dennis Wilson - background vocals
- Curtis Young - background vocals

Technical

- Drew Bollman - assistant
- Emory Gordy Jr. - producer
- Todd Gunnerson - assistant
- Russ Martin - recording
- Glenn Meadows - mastering
- Justin Niebank - recording, mixing
- Jason Piske - assistant
- Dennis Ritchie - assistant

=== Track 2 only ===
Musicians

- Bruce Bouton - steel guitar
- Mark Casstevens - acoustic guitar
- Mike Chapman - bass guitar
- Rob Hajacos - fiddle
- Chris Leuzinger - electric guitar
- Joey Miskulin - accordion
- Milton Sledge - drums
- Bobby Wood - keyboards

Technical

- Eric Conn - digital editing
- Duke Duczer - assistant
- Carlos Grier - digital editing
- John Kelton - engineering
- Mark Miller - mixing, recording
- Denny Purcell - mastering
- Allen Reynolds - producer
- Keith Stegall - assistant

=== Tracks 3, 6, 11 ===
Musicians

- Eddie Bayers - drums
- Stuart Duncan - fiddle
- Paul Franklin - steel guitar
- Brent Mason - electric guitar
- Gary Prim - piano
- John Wesley Ryles - background vocals
- David Smith - bass guitar
- Bruce Watkins - acoustic guitar

Technical

- Steve Harbison - assistant
- John Kelton - recording, mixing
- Matt Rovey - assistant
- Keith Stegall - producer
- Hank Williams - mastering

=== Visual ===
- Missy Herrington - design
- Beth Lee - art direction
- Jim Shea - photography

== Year-end charts ==
Chart (2001)	Position
Canadian Country Albums (Nielsen SoundScan)	95
