= The Lily of the Valley =

1881 Salvation Army hymn

- Genre: Hymn
- Written: 1881
- Text: C.W. Fry
- Based on: Song of Solomon 2:1
- Meter: 14.11.14.11.13.10 with refrain
- Melody: "Salvationist" by William S. Hays (arranged by Ira D. Sankey)

"The Lily of the Valley" ("I've Found a Friend in Jesus") is a Christian hymn written by Charles William Fry (1837–1882) in London for the Salvation Army. Ira D. Sankey arranged the words to the music of "The Little Old Log Cabin In The Lane" composed by Will Hays.

== History ==
The Lily of the Valley is a standard gospel song which has appeared in many protestant hymnals. It was written by Charles W. Fry reflecting his experience with the Salvation Army.

Fry and his family were members of the Salvation Army organization founded by William Booth which was then in crisis. It is recorded that Fry did not like the abuse he saw hurled at the Salvation Army when they established their ministry in 1878 in Salisbury, where the Fry family lived. Mr. Fry, who was a bricklayer, and his three sons offered to serve as bodyguards for the Salvation Army workers. The next day the four men arrived with their “weapons". These weapons consisted of two cornets, a trombone and a small tuba. In between fighting off the troublemakers, the Fry men played, and their music attracted a crowd for the Salvation Army preachers. This was the first Salvation Army brass band with Mr. Fry as the leader of the band as inscribed on his grave stone.

Fry took the term "Lily of the Valley" from the book of Song of Solomon 2:1 < I am the rose of Sharon, the lily of the valley …>. He used this verse of Scripture to represent the message of the preacher William Booth to the people during the protests of 1881 describing a personal, intimate relationship with Jesus. Those words were first published in the December 29, 1881, edition of the Salvation Army national magazine, the War Cry. Charles Fry died the year after publishing the hymn, on August 24, 1882, in Park Hall, Polmont, Scotland. American evangelist Ira D. Sankey adapted Fry's words to the music of "The Little Old Log Cabin in the Lane" composed in 1871 by Will Hays for a secular minstrel show.

== Lyrics ==
The opening verse and chorus:

I've found a friend in Jesus,— He's ev'rything to me
He's the fairest of ten thousand to my soul!
The "Lily of the Valley," in Him alone I see,
All I need to cleanse and make me fully whole
In sorrow He's my comfort, in trouble He's my stay
He tells me ev'ry care on Him to Roll

(chorus)
He's the "Lily of the Valley," the Bright and Morning Star
He's the fairest of ten thousand to my soul

"The Lily of the Valley" is a gospel standard and appears in almost all Protestant hymnals.

Some hymnals such as the Church of the Nazarene hymnal in the mid 20th century added the word Hallelujah after the word roll.

== Bibliography ==
- Sankey, Ira D. My Life and the Story of the Gospel Hymns and of Sacred Songs and Solos. Philadelphia: The Sunday School times Company (1906).
