= Walk Through This World with Me (song) =

Single by George Jones

from the album Walk Through This World with Me
- B-side: "Developing My Pictures"
- Released: January 1967
- Recorded: May 23, 1966
- Studio: Columbia (Nashville, Tennessee)
- Genre: Country
- Label: Musicor
- Songwriters: Sandy Seamons; Kaye Savage
- Producer: Pappy Daily

George Jones singles chronology
"Close Together (As You and Me)" (1966)	"Walk Through This World with Me" (1967)	"I Can't Get There from Here" (1967)

"Walk Through This World with Me" is a song written by Sandy Seamons and Kaye Jeanne Savage and recorded by American country music artist George Jones. It was released in January 1967 as the title track of his twenty-fourth album. The single was George Jones' fifty-seventh release on the country chart and his fourth number one. "Walk Through This World With Me" stayed at number one for two weeks and spent a total of nineteen weeks on the country chart. This song was originally released with a backing chorus by The Jordanaires repeating some of his verses on his 1966 album We Found Heaven Right Here on Earth at "4033", and then re-recorded on November 30, 1966 without The Jordanaires echoing his verses for the single release.

== Recording and composition ==
Jones was less than enthusiastic about the musically middle-of-the-road love ballad that was almost inspirational in its unabashedly optimistic and romantic sentiments, and it was only at his producer H.W. "Pappy" Daily's insistence that he recorded the song at all. In the 1994 retrospective Golden Hits, Jones states that he was unhappy with his singing on the LP version and, after the song started getting heavy airplay in Chicago, he told his manager Pappy Daily that he wanted to recut it. "The single record on it was different," he asserted in the documentary, "even though it was almost the same. I did a little better job singing the single than I did on the album." Two years later he elaborated in his autobiography I Lived to Tell It All:

"At first I fought Pappy, telling him consistently that I thought the song was weak. He kept pitching it to me, and I kept telling him no. He regularly brought it to me at recording sessions, which meant that he brought it to me often...I couldn't believe that a song I had resisted so much had done so well."

For all his dominance of the country charts for most of his career, Jones would only score nine solo #1 hits in his lifetime, with "Walk Through This World with Me" being his first since "She Thinks I Still Care" in 1962. Jones would not score another #1 until "The Grand Tour" in 1974.

== Other versions ==
- Nancy Sinatra, covered that song for the 1967 album Country, My Way
- Engelbert Humperdinck recorded this song for his 1967 debut album, Release Me.
- Tammy Wynette recorded this song for her 1967 debut album, Your Good Girl's Gonna Go Bad.
- french (Quebequois) version by Nicole LeBlanc & Serge Caissie: tend(s) moi la main

== Chart performance ==
Chart (1967)	Peak position
U.S. Billboard Hot Country Singles	1
