= Will You Visit Me on Sunday =

Studio album by George Jones
- Released: May 1970
- Genre: Country
- Length: 27:08
- Label: Musicor
- Producer: Pappy Daily

George Jones chronology
Where Grass Won't Grow (1969)	Will You Visit Me on Sunday (1970)	George Jones with Love (1971)

Professional ratings
Review scores
Source	Rating
AllMusic	2/5 stars
The Encyclopedia of Popular Music	2/5 stars

Will You Visit Me on Sunday is a 1970 country music studio album released by George Jones. The album contains seven tracks written by Dallas Frazier, one written by his wife, Tammy Wynette, and others. Gusto Records acquired the Musicor Records catalog and has re-issued some of George Jones' long out of print albums onto CD. This album was re-issued as "Image of Me" on CD in 2014. It contains the same tracks as the original album, but in a different order.

== Background and critical reception ==
Will You Visit Me On Sunday, one of the singer's last releases on Musicor, peaked at number 44 on the country album charts, a dismal showing for a Jones record.

Chris Woodstra of AllMusic notes, "When people criticize George's Musicor recordings for over-the-top arrangements and intrusive sappy vocal choruses, they're probably thinking of albums like this one...In fact it doesn't even look like a country album - the cover shows a seductive model and spells out the title in neo-psychedelic, wavy orange print." Billboard praised the Frazier tracks, calling them "standouts." Dave Marsh, in The New Rolling Stone Record Guide, noted that hits such as "All I Have to Offer You Is Me" made Jones "an influence among other country artists beyond his commercial stature."

== Track listing ==
No.	Title	Writer(s)	Length
1.	"Rosie Bokay"	(Dallas Frazier, Sanger D. Shafer	2:37
2.	"All I Have to Offer You Is Me"	Frazier, Arthur Leo Owens	3:02
3.	"Image of Me"	Wayne Kemp	2:50
4.	"I Stayed Long Enough"	Tammy Wynette	2:28
5.	"These Hands"	Eddie Noack	2:45
6.	"How Much Rain Can One Man Stand"	Frazier	2:21
7.	"Will You Visit Me on Sunday"	Frazier	2:49
8.	"I'm Finally Over You"	Frazier, Shafer	2;19
9.	"Fortune I've Gone Through"	Frazier	2:31
10.	"She's as Close as I Can Get to Loving You"	Frazier, Owens	2:40

== Chart Performance ==
=== Album ===
Chart (1970)	Peak position
US Top Country Albums (Billboard)	44
