= Homecoming in Heaven =

Studio album by George Jones
- Released: December 1, 1962
- Recorded: 1962
- Studio: Columbia (Nashville, Tennessee)
- Genre: Country, gospel
- Length: 26:05
- Label: United Artists
- Producer: Pappy Daily

George Jones chronology
George Jones Sings Bob Wills (1962)	Homecoming in Heaven (1962)	My Favorites of Hank Williams (1962)

Professional ratings
Review scores
Source	Rating
Allmusic	link

Homecoming in Heaven is an album by American country music artist George Jones. It was released in 1962 on the United Artists record label.
The album is George Jones' second collection of gospel songs. The majority of the songs on the album are newly written, including selections from Willie Nelson, J.P. Richardson (the Big Bopper), and George himself. Pappy Daily assembled a choir to support Jones, which places the music somewhere between traditional, stripped-down country gospel and polished, Nashville country-pop.

== Track listing ==
No.	Title	Writer(s)	Length
1.	"Someone's Watching Over You"	J.P. Richardson	2:27
2.	"He Made Me Free"	Darrell Edwards	2:39
3.	"Beacon in the Night"	Edwards, Herbie Treece	1:52
4.	"Matthew Twenty-Four"	Lonnie Glossom	2:18
5.	"Peace in the Valley"	Thomas A. Dorsey	2:41
6.	"Wings of a Dove"	Bob Ferguson	2:04
7.	"Wandering Soul"	Bill Dudley, Jones	2:28
8.	"He's So Good to Me"	Clyde Beavers	2:01
9.	"Magic Valley"	Richardson, Merle Moore	2:19
10.	"Kneel at the Feet of Jesus"	Willie Nelson	2:03
11.	"Homecoming in Heaven"	Walt Breeland, Paul Buskirk, Claude Gray, Nelson	2:31
12.	"My Cup Runneth Over"	Edwards	2:42

== Release History ==
Region	Date	Format(s)	Label(s)	Ref
US	December, 1962	Vinyl, LP, Stereo	United Artists Records	
US	1995	CD, Album	Razor & Tie	
US	1995	Cassette	Razor & Tie	
