= Walk Through This World with Me =

Studio album by George Jones
- Released: February 1967
- Genre: Country
- Length: 25:00
- Label: Musicor
- Producer: Pappy Daily

George Jones chronology
We Found Heaven Right Here on Earth at "4033" (1966)	Walk Through; This World with Me (1967)	Sings the Songs of Dallas Frazier (1968)

Professional ratings
Review scores
Source	Rating
Allmusic	3/5 stars

Walk Through This World with Me is the twenty-fourth studio album by American country music artist George Jones released in 1967 on the Musicor Records label. The 10-track LP is a tightly curated 25-minute listen blending Jones's emotive honky-tonk delivery with "Jonesized" versions of other popular country hits of the era, such as "Lonely Street" and "Life Turned Her That Way". The album acts as a masterclass in classic country storytelling and traditional Nashville Sound arrangements.

== Track listing ==
No.	Title	Writer(s)	Length
1.	"Walk Through This World With Me"	Sandy Seamons, Kaye Savage	2:15
2.	"The Shoe Goes On the Other Foot Tonight"	Buddy Mize	2:33
3.	"Sweet Thang"	Nat Stuckey	2:45
4.	"Am I That Easy to Forget"	Carl Belew, W.S. Stevenson	2:04
5.	"Apartment #9""	Johnny Paycheck, Bobby Austin	2:29
6.	"There Goes My Everything"	Dallas Frazier	2:35
7.	"Life Turned Her That Way"	Harlan Howard	2:27
8.	"Almost Persuaded"	Billy Sherrill, Glenn Sutton	2:55
9.	"Lonely Street"	Carl Belew, W.S. Stevenson, Kenny Sowder	2:04
10.	"That Heart Belongs to Me"	Webb Pierce	2:02

== Chart Performance ==
=== Album ===
Chart (1967)	Peak position
US Top Country Albums (Billboard)	2

=== Singles ===
Single	Chart	Peak position
Walk Through This World With Me	U.S. Billboard Hot Country Singles	11
