= William Shakespeare Hays =

American poet

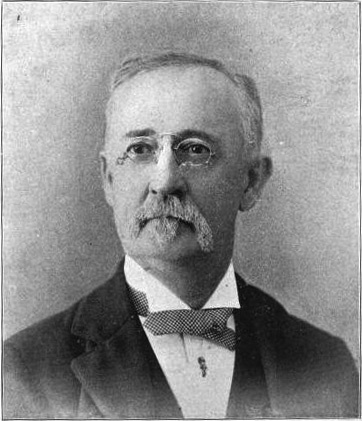
- Hays in 1895
- Born: July 19, 1837; Louisville, Kentucky, U.S.
- Died: July 23, 1907 (aged 70); Louisville, Kentucky, U.S.
- Resting place: Cave Hill Cemetery; Louisville, Kentucky, U.S.
- Occupations: Poet; songwriter
- Spouse: Rosa Belle McCullough
- Children: 2

William Shakespeare Hays (July 19, 1837 – July 23, 1907) was an American poet and lyricist. He wrote some 350 songs over his career and sold as many as 20 million copies of his works. These pieces varied in tone from low comedy to sentimental and pious; his material was sometimes confused with that of Stephen Foster as a result. In his later years, Hays put forth one of the more plausible claims to authorship of the song "Dixie". In the end, however, no evidence could be produced to back up his pretensions.

== Biography ==
Hays was born as William Hays in Louisville, Kentucky, which was then a small but rapidly growing city where he would spend most of his life. He published his first poetry in 1856 and 1857 through the paper of his Georgetown, Kentucky, school. Hays eventually received the nickname "Shakespeare" for his writings, an appellation he made a formal part of his name.

Hays finished school and returned to Louisville in 1857. He found employment at D. P. Fauld's music store, where he continued to write music and poetry. He published many of his pieces under pen names, including Syah ("Hays" spelled backward). He also produced three small collections of poetry.

Over his career, Hays is credited with over 350 songs, and he may have sold as many as 20 million copies of his works, making him more prolific than most of his 19th century peers. His songs show a great variety, ranging from austere hymns to base minstrel tunes. In fact, the style of some of his songs was so like that of Stephen Foster that the two men's material was sometimes confused.

Hays was married to Rosa Belle McCullough (1847–1935), and the couple had two children, Mattie and Samuel. Hays died in Louisville on July 23, 1907, less than a week after his 70th birthday. He is buried in Cave Hill Cemetery.

== "Dixie" claims ==
In his later years, Hays claimed to have written the lyrics to "Dixie", a song that had enjoyed unprecedented popularity since before the American Civil War and that was by then usually attributed to minstrel show songwriter Dan Emmett. Specifically, Hays said that he had written the song at Faulds in 1858, one year before Emmett and Bryant's Minstrels first performed it.

In May 1907, Hays presented his claims to a Southern historical society in Louisville known as the Filson Club. The organization formed a subcommittee and investigated. On June 4, the subcommittee chair announced that he had received word from a man in Texas who claimed to have a copy of Hays's sheet music, published through D. P. Faulds. Nevertheless, the document never materialized.

Meanwhile, the 70-year-old Hays grew ill, and his wife took over management of his case. She wrote to Oliver Ditson & Co., a Boston-based publisher, for information on "Away Down South in Dixie" by Will S. Hays. They responded that they did not have such a song in their catalog. William Shakespeare Hays died in 1907 with no resolution to his claim.

However, Hays's claim was not forgotten. In 1908, Thomas J. Firth, a music teacher in Memphis, Tennessee, who had led the 13th Tennessee Volunteers band, contacted D. P. Faulds. The publisher claimed to have printed 50,000 copies of the song a year earlier than Firth, Pond & Co. did so for Emmett. Faulds said that his version was copyrighted and attributed to Hays as "Way Down South in Dixie". Furthermore, Faulds wrote that only the lyrics had been copyrighted, since the music came from an earlier English song that began "If I were a soldier wouldn't I go . . .", and which had been subsequently parodied in a children's song. Unfortunately for Firth, all copies had been lost in a store fire. Evidence suggests that Faulds's did publish a song called "Away Down South in Dixie" with words attributed to "Jerry Blossom" and music by "Dixie Jr.", but it was in 1860—after Firth, Pond & Co.'s version. In 1917, Thomas J. Firth wrote to Mrs. Hays for a copy of Hays's version of the song, but she had none to show him.

In 1916, Edward Le Roy Rice, journalist for The New York Clipper, wrote to Mrs. Hays and explained that he was researching a book on "Dixie" and wished to settle the authorship argument once and for all. Still, Mrs. Hays was unable to provide him with any evidence to support her husband in the dispute.

In 1937, Hays's daughter made one final attempt to support her father as the author of "Dixie". She wrote to The Etude that her father had written "Dixie" for the Buckner Guards "when they were called south during the Civil War". The editor, James Coke, asked for evidence, but she could provide none. To this day, there remains, as yet, no known evidence to support Hays' claim that he did indeed write "Dixie".
