= She Thinks I Still Care =

1962 song written by Dickey Lee and Steve Duffy

Single by George Jones

from the album The New Favorites of George Jones
- B-side: "Sometimes You Just Can't Win"
- Released: April 14, 1962
- Recorded: January 4, 1962
- Studio: Bradley Studios, Nashville, Tennessee
- Genre: Country
- Length: 2:34
- Label: United Artists
- Songwriters: Dickey Lee, Steve Duffy
- Producer: Pappy Daily

George Jones singles discography singles chronology
"Achin', Breakin' Heart" (1962)	"She Thinks I Still Care" (1962)	"Beacon In the Night" (1962)

"He Thinks I Still Care"

Single by Connie Francis

from the album Country Music Connie Style
- A-side: "I Was Such a Fool (To Fall in Love with You)"
- Released: September 1962
- Recorded: June 18, 1962
- Studio: Columbia, Nashville, Tennessee
- Genre: Country
- Length: 3:17
- Label: MGM
- Songwriters: Dickey Lee, Steve Duffy
- Producers: Danny Davis, Jim Vienneau

Connie Francis US singles chronology
"Vacation" / "The Biggest Sin of All" (1962)	"I Was Such a Fool (To Fall in Love with You)" / " He Thinks I Still Care" (1962)	"I'm Gonna Be Warm This Winter/ Al di là" (1962)

"She Thinks I Still Care" is a country song written by Dickey Lee and Steve Duffy. First popularized by George Jones, the song has been recorded by many artists, including Connie Francis, Anne Murray, Elvis Presley, Michael Nesmith, and Patty Loveless.

"He Thinks I Still Care"

Single by Anne Murray

from the album Danny's Song
- A-side: "You Won't See Me"
- Released: April 1974
- Recorded: September 1972
- Genre: Country, pop
- Label: Capitol 3867
- Songwriters: Dickey Lee, Steve Duffy
- Producer: Brian Ahern

Anne Murray singles chronology
"A Love Song" (1974)	"He Thinks I Still Care" / "You Won't See Me" (1974)	"Son of a Rotten Gambler" (1974)

== George Jones version ==
Jones first heard the song when Jack Clement played it for him at Gulf Coast Studio in Beaumont, which Clement owned with Bill Hall. The song had been written by Dickey Lee and Steve Duffy, two professional songwriters under contract to Clement's publishing company, so Clement was eager for Jones to record it. According to Jones biographer Bob Allen, Jones had little interest, responding, "I don't like it too much. It's got too many damn 'just becauses' in it. I don't think nobody really wants to hear that shit, do you?" Undeterred, both Clement and Hall continued to pitch the song to Jones. Raymond Nalley, brother of Gulf Coast session musician Luther Nalley, later recalled:

"They had this ole, wornout, rinky-dink tape recorder layin' around the studio...Everytime they'd try to lay that song on George, he'd just look at that damn tape recorder and ask 'em, 'How much you sell me that thing for?' One day, Bill Hall finally told him, 'Hell, George, if you'll record the song, I'll give ya the damn tape recorder!'"

In his essay for 1994 Sony retrospective The Essential George Jones: The Spirit of Country, Rich Kienzle also states that Jones was underwhelmed by the song after Clement had "decided not to play George the tape but to sing him the song, altering the melody as he sang it to give it a stronger country feel." Jones himself always insisted he had no doubts about the song. Recalling his first impression of the tune, he insisted in the 1989 documentary Same Ole Me, "Boy, I just flipped! I said, 'Golly, lemme have this thing.'" In the 1994 video retrospective Golden Hits, he added, "It knocked me out. I couldn't wait to get into the studio." The song was released in April 1962, his first single release on United Artists after leaving Mercury, and it remained on the Billboard survey for twenty-three weeks, six of them at #1. In his autobiography I Lived to Tell It All, the singer wrote, "For years after I recorded it, the song was my most requested, and it became what people in my business call a 'career record,' the song that firmly establishes your identity with the public." The B-side, "Sometimes You Just Can't Win", reached No. 17 on the C&W chart. "She Thinks I Still Care" was one of seven records George would chart in 1962, and in the fall of 1963 he would travel to New York City and perform the song on Jimmy Dean's ABC network show.

In 1999, this version of the song was inducted into the Grammy Hall of Fame.

== Cover versions ==
=== Chart versions ===
- Connie Francis recorded the song as "He Thinks I Still Care" in a June 18, 1962, session at Columbia Recording Studio in Nashville, Tennessee for her album Country Music Connie Style, which was produced by Danny Davis and Jim Vienneau. The track had a September 1962 single release as the B-side to "I Was Such a Fool (To Fall in Love with You)" but garnered enough attention to reach No. 57 on the Billboard Hot 100 (No. 51 on the Cash Box Top 100 Singles, and the Music Vendor Pop chart). "He Thinks I Still Care" would also out-do "I Was Such a Fool" in Canada, reaching a higher No. 26 on the charts there.
- Anne Murray remade "He Thinks I Still Care" for her 1973 Danny's Song album and in 1974 this track was issued as the B-side to Murray's cover version of the Lennon–McCartney-penned "You Won't See Me". While "You Won't See Me" was a No. 8 hit on the Billboard Hot 100 and No. 1 on the Billboard Easy Listening Singles chart, "He Thinks I Still Care" was shopped to country radio. In July, just as "You Won't See Me" peaked in popularity at Top 40 stations, "He Thinks I Still Care" became Murray's first No. 1 hit on the Billboard Hot Country Singles chart.

=== Other recordings ===
- Little Willie John covered the song in 1962.
- Del Shannon recorded "She Thinks I Still Care" for his 1963 album Little Town Flirt.
- The Rip Chords recorded the song as the B-side of their 1963 single Gone.
- Bill Haley & His Comets recorded a Spanish-language version of the song for the Mexican Orfeon Records label circa 1964.
- Cher recorded the song as "He Thinks I Still Care" in 1965 for her debut solo album All I Really Want To Do.
- Jerry Lee Lewis covered it on his 1966 album Memphis Beat.
- Merle Haggard cut the song for his 1969 LP A Portrait of Merle Haggard and recorded the song again for his 2006 album with Jones Kickin' Out the Footlights...Again.
- Michael Nesmith included a cover of the song on his 1972 album Tantamount to Treason Vol. 1 with the Second National Band.
- Glen Campbell recorded the song on his 1972 album Glen Travis Campbell.
- Leon Russell covered the song on his 1973 album Hank Wilson's Back.
- John Fogerty recorded the song for his 1973 album The Blue Ridge Rangers.
- Elvis Presley recorded the song for his final studio album, Moody Blue and it was released as the B-side to his No. 1 country hit "Moody Blue" in 1977.
- In the late 1970s, The Kendalls covered the song as the gender-neutral "You Think I Still Care".
- Conway Twitty covered the song on his 1980 album Heart & Soul.
- Kirsty MacColl recorded the song, in the manner of a 1950s ballad (interpolating the melody of "Blue Moon") as "He Thinks I Still Care" on her 1981 album Desperate Character.
- James Taylor often covered the song in concert, including a recording of it on his 1993 Live album.
- Dead Ringer Band recorded the song as "He Thinks I Still Care" on their 1998 album Hopeville.
- Teddy Thompson included a version on his 2007 collection of classic country covers Upfront & Down Low.
- Patty Loveless covered the song as "He Thinks I Still Care" on her 2008 album Sleepless Nights.
- Australian singer Gina Jeffreys covered the song as "He Thinks I Still Care" on her album, Old Paint (2010).
- Watkins Family Hour covered the song on their self-titled 2015 debut album.
- Glen Campbell's final album Adiós has a new version recorded which was released June 2017.
- Fat White Family's Saul Adamczewski and Childhood's Ben Romans-Hopcraft covered the song on their 2018 album Karaoke for One: Vol 1 under the band name Insecure Men.

== Chart performance ==
=== George Jones ===
Chart (1962)	Peak position
US Hot Country Songs (Billboard)	1

=== Connie Francis ===
Chart (1962)	Peak position
US Billboard Hot 100	57
US Billboard Easy Listening	18
US Cashbox Top 100 Singles	51
US Music Vendor 100 Top Pops	51
Canada CHUM Chart	26

=== Anne Murray ===
Chart (1974)	Peak position
US Hot Country Songs (Billboard)	1
Canadian RPM Country Tracks	11
