= Leon Payne =

American musician (1917-1969)

Leon Payne

Leon Roger Payne (June 15, 1917 – September 11, 1969), "the Blind Balladeer", was an American country music singer and songwriter.

== Life ==
Leon Roger Payne was born in Alba, Texas, on June 15, 1917. He was blind in one eye at birth, and lost the sight in the other eye in early childhood. He attended the Texas School for the Blind from 1924 to 1935. He married Myrtie and they had two children together, as well as two children from Myrtie's previous marriage. Payne died at age 52 from a heart attack in 1969 in San Antonio, Texas. Myrtie died in San Antonio in 2008, and Leon's composition "I Love You Because" was played at her funeral service by pedal steel guitarist Emmett Roch, accompanied by musicians who were members of her church.

== Career ==
Leon wrote hundreds of country songs in a prolific career that lasted from 1941 until his death. He is perhaps best known for "I Love You Because," "You've Still Got a Place in My Heart," and the 1948 song "Lost Highway," a song made famous by Hank Williams in 1949. Payne's own version of "I Love You Because" reached number one on the Billboard country chart, the only version to do so. Leon Payne also wrote under the pen name of "Pat Patterson" on tracks such as "It's Nothing to Me," performed by Sanford Clark.

He began his music career in the mid-1930s, playing a variety of musical instruments in public; he started performing on KWET radio in Palestine, Texas, in 1935. He also had a stint playing with Bob Wills' Texas Playboys in 1938. Payne was a regular working musician at Jerry Irby's nightclub in Houston, Texas. He joined his stepbrother, famed songwriter Jack Rhodes, and formed Jack Rhodes and the Lone Star Buddies in 1949. They performed regularly on the Louisiana Hayride show in Shreveport, Louisiana. He was later on the Grand Ole Opry.

Much of his musical legacy is recordings of his songs by other artists, perhaps most famous of which are two minor hits for Hank Williams, "Lost Highway" and "They'll Never Take Her Love From Me."

== Notable recordings and covers by other artists ==
- Hank Williams recorded "Lost Highway" in 1949 and "They'll Never Take Her Love From Me" in 1950.
- Eddie Fisher recorded "I Love You Because" in 1952 on his album Eddie Fisher Sings.
- Elvis Presley recorded "I Love You Because" for Sun Records in 1954.
- Willie Nelson and Johnny Cash recorded "Lumberjack" in 1957 and 1960
- Al Martino recorded "I Love You Because" in 1963. Reached #3 on the Billboard pop chart.
- Johnny Horton recorded "Lost Highway" in 1959 and "They'll Never Take Her Love From Me" and "Miss Marcy" in 1960.
- Johnny Cash recorded "I Love You Because" for Sun Records in 1958.
- Jim Reeves covered "I Love You Because" and "Blue Side of Lonesome," which were released in 1964 and 1966, respectively. The latter reached number one on the Billboard US country charts.
- Eddie Noack recorded "Psycho" in 1968. This version was barely released and the song remained obscure until covered by Michigan singer Jack Kittel in 1973. The Kittel version reached #114 in the Cash Box "Looking Ahead" survey, September 1974.
- Merle Haggard recorded "Teach Me to Forget" on his 1968 album Mama Tried.
- George Jones recorded "Blue Side of Lonesome" on his 1966 album Love Bug; he later devoted an entire album of Payne's songs, George Jones Sings the Great Songs of Leon Payne, in 1971.
- Leon Russell included "Lost Highway" on the first of his pseudonymous country albums, "Hank Wilson's Back," released in 1973.
- Emmylou Harris recorded "They'll Never Take His Love From Me" in 1979.
- Joan Baez and Bob Dylan can be seen performing "Lost Highway" in a hotel room in the 1965 documentary Dont Look Back.
- Elvis Costello and T-Bone Burnett, under the pseudonyms Hank Coward and Howard Coward (The Coward Brothers), released "They'll Never Take Her Love From Me" as the B side of a single in 1986. The cut was restored as a bonus track in a 1995 re-release of Costello's Burnett-produced King of America album.
- Elvis Costello also released a live version of Payne's song "Psycho."
- Jason & the Scorchers, then known as Jason & the Nashville Scorchers, recorded a country-punk version of "Lost Highway" on their first full-length LP, "Lost & Found," in 1985.
- Australian blues/rock band The Beasts of Bourbon also released a cover of "Psycho" in 1984. It is included in their debut album, The Axeman's Jazz.
- Elliott Smith played Payne's song "They'll Never Take Her Love From Me" and "Lost Highway" live on more than one occasion.
- The Waterboys recorded a version of "Lost Highway" on the b-side of their December 1998 Fisherman's Blues single.
- Doug Sahm played Payne's song "They'll Never Take Her Love From Me" on his album The Return of Wayne Douglas.
- Jeff Buckley played "Lost Highway" live. It was released posthumously on the re-release of his debut album Grace.
- Ricky Skaggs recorded "Selfishness in Man".
- Freakwater recorded "Selfishness in Man".
- Buddy and Julie Miller recorded "Selfishness in Man" on their album Written in Chalk
- The Mekons played "Lost Highway" on their album Fear and Whiskey.
- Tom Petty & the Heartbreakers recorded "Lost Highway" in 2006; video footage of that recording appears in their documentary, "Running Down a Dream."
- Carlene Carter recorded "You Are the One" in 1990.
- Carl Smith recorded "You Are the One" in 1957.
- Kurt Nilsen recorded "Lost Highway" as a duet with Willie Nelson in 2008.
- John Prine recorded "The Blue Side of Lonesome" and "I Love You Because" for his "Standard Songs for Average People" in 2007.
- Bill Frisell recorded "Lost Highway" on the Nonesuch album "Further East/Further West" in 2005.
- Townes Van Zandt recorded a version of "Lost Highway", released on the album "Highway Kind" in 1997, shortly after his death.
- Chris Hillman and Herb Pedersen recorded "Lost Highway" on their 1996 disc "Bakersfield Bound."
- The Handsome Family covered "Lost Highway" and it was released on their b-sides collection, Scattered.
- "It's Nothing To Me" (written under pseudonym P. Patterson) was recorded by Jim Reeves (1961), The Coasters (1964; as "T'ain't Nothin' To Me), Harlan Howard (1967), Sanford Clark (1967), Johnny Winter (1973), The Sadies (1999), and Lee Hazlewood (2006).
- Ricky Warwick covered "Psycho" on his solo Hearts on Trees acoustic album (2014).
- Glen Campbell recorded Payne's "They'll Never Take Her Love From Me" and "You've Still Got A Place In My Heart".
- Rex Allen Sr. recorded "Jose Villa Lobo Alfredo Thomaso Vincente Lopez" on "The Smooth Country Sound of Rex Allen".
- Kacey Musgraves recorded "Lost Highway" in 2025.
