= The Window Up Above =

1960 single by George Jones

Single by George Jones

from the album Greatest Hits
- B-side: "Candy Hearts"
- Released: September 1960
- Genre: Country
- Label: Mercury
- Songwriter: George Jones

George Jones singles chronology
"Out of Control" (1960)	"The Window Up Above" (1960)	"Family Bible" (1961)

"Window Up Above"

Single by Mickey Gilley

from the album Movin' On
- B-side: "I'm Movin' On"
- Released: February 1975
- Genre: Country
- Length: 2:38
- Label: Playboy
- Songwriter: George Jones
- Producer: Eddie Kilroy

Mickey Gilley singles chronology
"City Lights" (1974)	"Window Up Above" (1975)	"Bouquet of Roses" (1975)

"The Window Up Above" is a song written and originally recorded by American country music artist George Jones. The version recorded by Jones peaked at number #2 on the country charts and spent a total of 34 weeks on the chart. It became a #1 hit for Mickey Gilley in 1975.

== Recording and composition ==
"The Window Up Above" is widely praised by many critics – and George Jones himself – as his greatest composition. In "The Devil in George Jones", an article which appeared in the July 1994 Texas Monthly, the singer told Nick Tosches that he wrote it one morning while living in Vidor, Texas, and that it remained his favorite: "I wrote it in about twenty minutes. I just came in off the road, about eight in the morning. While breakfast was being fixed, I just sat down in the den and picked up the guitar, and it was as simple as that. Sometimes it’s hard to even figure where the ideas come from.” Tosches added, "For Jones, 'The Window Up Above' seemed to issue directly from a lifelong insecurity and ambivalence, a deep-rooted fear of what lurked beneath the dream of hearth and home and happiness." The song addresses the theme of adultery, but adds a foreboding, voyeuristic twist to the typical country music "cheatin'" song, filled with jealous anger and a deep, irreconcilable sense of betrayal:

I've been living a new way
of life that I love so
but I can see the clouds are gathering
and the storm will wreck our home
For last night he held you tightly
and you didn't even shove
This is true because I was watching
from the window up above

The song signaled a new era for Jones as a vocalist; in his book George Jones: The Life and Times of a Honky Tonk Legend, biographer Bob Allen writes that when Jones recorded "The Window Up Above," he sang it "in a taut, almost offhand manner that called to mind the style of one of his heroes, Lefty Frizzell. He sang in a manner which merely insinuated the presence of wild, barely suppressed emotions seething just under the surface..." Although up to this point in his career Jones had been primarily known as a honky tonk country singer, his phrasing was becoming more subtle and complex as his own vocal style emerged. As Rich Kienzle notes in the liner notes to The Essential George Jones: The Spirit of Country, "His tense, emotional delivery not only created a memorable recording, it was the first real demonstration of his increasingly powerful phrasing as he twisted and wrenched every drop of emotion out of the simple lyrics."

"The Window Up Above" remained on the country charts for more than eight months, and Jones even had Nudie Cohn make him a stage suit based on it, a chartreuse affair replete with faces peering forlornly from sequin-stitched window frames. The song shot to #2 for Jones in 1960, and would be covered by several other artists, including Loretta Lynn and Leon Russell. In 1975, Mickey Gilley recorded "Window Up Above" and it became his fourth #1 on the country chart. The single stayed in the top spot for a single week and spent a total of twelve weeks on the country chart. Jones would later record two different duet versions, one with Leon Russell and another with Ralph Stanley.

== Chart performance ==
=== George Jones ===
Chart (1960)	Peak position
US Hot Country Songs (Billboard)	2

=== Mickey Gilley ===
Chart (1975)	Peak position
US Hot Country Songs (Billboard)	1
Canadian RPM Country Tracks	1
