= 50 Years of Hits =

2004 compilation album by George Jones

Compilation album by George Jones
- Released: November 9, 2004
- Recorded: 1955–2004
- Genre: Country
- Length: Disc 1 – 45:04; Disc 2 – 51:07; Disc 3 – 54:18
- Label: Bandit
- Producer: Pappy Daily; Billy Sherrill; Norro Wilson; Buddy Cannon; Kyle Lehning; Evelyn Shriver

George Jones compilation albums chronology
Live with the Possum (1999)	50 Years of Hits (2004)

Professional ratings
Review scores
Source	Rating
AllMusic	link

50 Years of Hits is a country album by George Jones who was signed to Starday Records in 1953, released his first singles in 1954, and had his first hit with "Why Baby Why'" in 1955.

== Background ==
Jones began recording in 1954 and his first releases were on the independent Starday label. As his career progressed, he moved to Mercury, United Artists, Musicor, Epic (where he remained for 19 years), MCA Nashville, Asylum, and Bullet Records. Billboard states that Jones has had more charted singles than any artist in any format of music, and 50 Years of Hits features one song per year, representing the actual year that song was released. Most of the time, the song chosen was Jones' biggest hit of that year, but sometimes it was chosen because Jones thought it was his best song that year. The set is not historically accurate; the compilers were unable to work out a deal with Musicor to feature Jones's late-'60s hits, so they were forced to substitute re-recordings of "Walk Through This World With Me," "She's Mine," "I'll Share My World With You," and "A Good Year for the Roses" for the originals. In addition, the inclusion of his number one single "Still Doin' Time" among his mid-1960s hits is an error; the song topped the charts in 1981. Finally, the inclusion of a 1979 duet he recorded with Waylon Jennings, "Night Life", appears out of place as it wasn't even a single. Nevertheless, the package is an enormous document of country music history in its own right, chronicling the career of a man who many believe is the greatest interpreter of the country song who ever lived. Jones had so many hits that some of them, such as his 1974 number one hit "The Door", and his chart topping duet "Golden Ring" with Tammy Wynette, could not be included.

In addition to Jennings and Wynette, the album includes appearances Melba Montgomery, Merle Haggard, Alan Jackson, the Oak Ridge Boys, Randy Travis, and Garth Brooks.

== Track listing ==
Disc one
No.	Title	Writer(s)	Length
1.	"Why Baby Why"	Darrell Edwards, George Jones	2:15
2.	"Just One More"	Jones	2:42
3.	"Tall, Tall Trees"	Jones, Roger Miller	2:26
4.	"Color of the Blues"	Jones, Lawton Williams	2:50
5.	"White Lightning"	J. P. Richardson	2:46
6.	"Window Up Above"	Jones	2:33
7.	"Tender Years"	Edwards, Jones	2:23
8.	"She Thinks I Still Care"	Steve Duffy, Dickey Lee	2:34
9.	"You Comb Her Hair"	Hank Cochran, Harlan Howard	2:40
10.	"The Race Is On"	Jones, Don Rollins	2:07
11.	"We Must Have Been Out of Our Minds" (with Melba Montgomery)	Earl Montgomery	2:39
12.	"Still Doin' Time"	Michael P. Heeney, John E. Moffat	2:49
13.	"Walk Through This World with Me" (re-recording)	Kaye Savage, Sandy Seamons	2:25
14.	"She's Mine"	Jones, Jack Ripley	3:02
15.	"I'll Share My World with You"	Ben Wilson	2:47
16.	"Good Year for the Roses" (with Alan Jackson)	Jerry Chesnut	3:37
17.	"Take Me" (with Tammy Wynette)	Jones, Leon Payne	2:20

Disc two
No.	Title	Writer(s)	Length
1.	"A Picture of Me (Without You)"	George Richey, Norro Wilson	2:31
2.	"Once You've Had the Best"	Johnny Paycheck	2:38
3.	"The Grand Tour"	Richey, Carmol Taylor, Wilson	3:05
4.	"These Days I Barely Get By"	Jones, Tammy Wynette	3:01
5.	"Her Name Is"	Bobby Braddock	2:19
6.	"Near You" (with Tammy Wynette)	Francis Craig, Kermit Goell	2:21
7.	"Bartender's Blues"	James Taylor	3:46
8.	"Night Life" (with Waylon Jennings)	Walt Breeland, Paul Buskirk, Willie Nelson	3:42
9.	"He Stopped Loving Her Today"	Braddock, Curly Putman	3:17
10.	"Yesterday's Wine" (with Merle Haggard)	Nelson	3:14
11.	"Same Ole Me"	Paul Overstreet	2:52
12.	"I Always Get Lucky with You"	Gary Church, Merle Haggard, Freddy Powers, Tex Whitson	3:18
13.	"She's My Rock"	Gene Dobbins	2:27
14.	"Who's Gonna Fill Their Shoes"	Max D. Barnes, Troy Seals	3:17
15.	"The One I Loved Back Then (The Corvette Song)"	Gary Gentry	2:30
16.	"The Right Left Hand"	Dennis Knutson, A.L. "Doodle" Owens	3:15
17.	"Radio Lover"	Ron Hellard, Bucky Jones	3:26

Disc three
No.	Title	Writer(s)	Length
1.	"(I'm a) One Woman Man"	Tillman Franks, Johnny Horton	2:15
2.	"A Few Ole Country Boys" (with Randy Travis)	Seals, Mentor Williams	3:38
3.	"You Couldn't Get the Picture"	Chuck Harter	3:34
4.	"Finally Friday"	Bobby Boyd, Dennis Robbins	2:43
5.	"I Don't Need Your Rockin' Chair"	Billy Yates, Frank Dycus, Kerry Kurt Phillips	2:48
6.	"High Tech Redneck"	Byron Hill, Zack Turner	2:26
7.	"One" (with Tammy Wynette)	Ed Bruce, Judith Bruce, Ed Jones, Ron Peterson	4:07
8.	"I Must Have Done Something Bad"	Red Lane	3:19
9.	"When Did You Stop Loving Me"	Donny Kees, Monty Holmes	3:43
10.	"Wild Irish Rose"	Braddock	4:39
11.	"Choices"	Yates, Mike Curtis	3:25
12.	"Cold Hard Truth"	Jamie O'Hara	4:06
13.	"Beer Run (B Double E Double Are You In?)" (with Garth Brooks)	Keith Anderson, Kent Blazy, George Ducas, Amanda Williams, Kim Williams	3:03
14.	"50,000 Names"	O'Hara	3:50
15.	"I Got Everything"	Al Anderson, Jim Hoke	3:13
16.	"Amazing Grace"	John Newton	3:22

== Producers ==
- Compilation producer: Evelyn Shriver
- Associate producers: Susan Nadler and Michael Campbell
- Art direction: Virginia Team and Luellyn Latocki
- Design by Don Baily for Latocki Team Creative, Nashville, TN
- Compilation engineered for release by Custom Mastering, Inc.

== Chart performance ==
Chart (2004)	Peak position
U.S. Billboard Top Country Albums	20
U.S. Billboard 200	118
U.S. Billboard Independent Albums	5

== Certifications ==
Region	Certification
United States (RIAA)	Gold
