= 16 Biggest Hits (George Jones album) =

Greatest hits album by George Jones
- Released: July 14, 1998
- Recorded: September 13, 1972 – September 28, 1988
- Genre: Country
- Length: 49:05
- Label: Legacy/Epic

George Jones compilation albums chronology
Super Hits, Volume 2 (1993)	16 Biggest Hits (1998)	Live With the Possum (1999)

Professional ratings
Review scores
Source	Rating
Allmusic	4/5 stars

16 Biggest Hits is a compilation album American country artist George Jones. This album was released on July 14, 1998, on the Legacy Recordings and Epic Records labels. It was certified Gold on November 5, 2002, by the RIAA. It has sold 1,188,000 copies in the US as of April 2013.

== Track listing ==
No.	Title	Writer(s)	Length
1.	"A Picture of Me (Without You)"	George Richey, Norro Wilson	2:30
2.	"What My Woman Can't Do"	George Jones, Earl Montgomery, Billy Sherrill	2:35
3.	"The Grand Tour"	Richey, Carmol Taylor, Wilson	3:06
4.	"These Days (I Barely Get By)"	Jones, Tammy Wynette	3:01
5.	"The Door"	Sherrill, Wilson	2:40
6.	"Bartender's Blues"	James Taylor	3:45
7.	"He Stopped Loving Her Today"	Bobby Braddock, Curly Putman	3:16
8.	"If Drinkin' Don't Kill Me (Her Memory Will)"	Rick Beresford, Harlan Sanders	3:09
9.	"Still Doin' Time"	Michael P. Heeney, John E. Moffat	2:48
10.	"I Always Get Lucky with You"	Gary Church, Merle Haggard, Freddy Powers, Tex Whitson	3:17
11.	"She's My Rock"	Gene Dobbins	2:26
12.	"Wine Colored Roses"	Dennis Knutson, A.L. "Doodle" Owens	3:17
13.	"The Right Left Hand"	Knutson, Owens	3:13
14.	"Radio Lover"	Ron Hellard, Bucky Jones, Curly Putman	3:25
15.	"The King Is Gone (So Are You)"	Roger D. Ferris	3:20
16.	"Who's Gonna Fill Their Shoes"	Max D. Barnes, Troy Seals	3:17

== Chart performance ==
Chart (1998)	Peak position
U.S. Billboard Top Country Albums	50
Chart (2013)	Peak position
U.S. Billboard 200	42

== Certifications ==
Region	Certification
United States (RIAA)	Platinum
