= Super Hits, Volume 2 =

Greatest hits album by George Jones
- Released: March 9, 1993
- Genre: Country
- Length: 28:30
- Label: Epic
- Producer: Billy Sherrill

George Jones Compilation Albums chronology
Super Hits (1987)	Super Hits, Volume 2 (1993)	16 Biggest Hits (1998)

Professional ratings
Review scores
Source	Rating
AllMusic	link
The Rolling Stone Album Guide	3.5/5 stars

Super Hits, Volume 2 is a greatest hits album by country music artist George Jones, released on March 9, 1993, on the Epic Records label.

== Track listing ==
No.	Title	Writer(s)	Length
1.	"The Door"	Billy Sherrill, Norro Wilson	2:43
2.	"Still Doin' Time"	Michael P. Heeney, John E. Moffat	2:50
3.	"Shine On (Shine All Your Sweet Love on Me)"	Johnny MacRae, Bob Morrison	3:22
4.	"I Always Get Lucky with You"	Merle Haggard, Gary Church, Freddy Powers, Tex Whitson	3:19
5.	"(I'm A) One Woman Man"	Johnny Horton, Tillman Franks	2:16
6.	"I Turn to You"	Max D. Barnes, Curly Putman	2:39
7.	"Wine Colored Roses"	Dennis Knutson, A.L. "Doodle" Owens	3:20
8.	"Loving You Could Never Be Better"	Earl Montgomery, Charlene Montgomery, Betty Tate	3:05
9.	"She Thinks I Still Care"	Dickey Lee, Steve Duffy	2:50
10.	"Radio Lover"	Ron Hellard, Bucky Jones, Putman	3:26
