= Live with the Possum =

Live album by George Jones
- Released: November 9, 1999
- Genre: Country
- Length: 41:12
- Label: Asylum Records

George Jones compilation albums chronology
16 Biggest Hits (1998)	Live with the Possum (1999)	50 Years of Hits (2004)

Professional ratings
Review scores
Source	Rating
Allmusic	2/5 stars

Live with the Possum is a live album by American country music singer George Jones released on November 9, 1999, on the Asylum Records label. It was Jones's second and final album with Asylum Records and his second ever live album. Recorded in Knoxville on May 21, 1993, at the Knoxville Civic Center in Knoxville, Tennessee, it was the soundtrack of a previously released video of Jones in concert called Live in Tennessee. Alan Jackson introduced the set with a short tribute. Ron Gaddis, Jones' bass player and band leader, provided vocals on "No Show Jones," the concert opener that George originally recorded with Merle Haggard in 1982. In 2006 Jones commented to Billboard, "As long as the people still want to come, I'm gonna be there. I don't care if I'm 95. I'm at the point in life where I really could shut it off, but what would I do?"

== Track listing ==
No.	Title	Writer(s)	Length
1.	"Intro" (by Alan Jackson)
2.	"No Show Jones"	George Jones, Glenn Martin	3:19
3.	"Once You've Had the Best"	Johnny Paycheck	3:19
4.	"The Race Is On"	Jones, Don Rollins	2:17
5.	"Bartender's Blues"	James Taylor	4:19
6.	"A Picture of Me (Without You)"	George Richey, Norro Wilson	3:48
7.	"The One I Loved Back Then (The Corvette Song)"	Gary Gentry	3:01
8.	"Who's Gonna Fill Their Shoes"	Max D. Barnes, Troy Seals	3:33
9.	"She Loved a Lot in Her Time"	Randy Boudreaux, Sam Hogin, Kim Williams	4:31
10.	"I'll Share My World with You/Window Up Above/The Grand Tour/Walk Through This World with Me"	Ben Wilson/Jones/Richey, Carmol Taylor, N. Wilson/Kaye Savage, Sandy Seamons	4:39
11.	"One Woman Man"	Tillman Franks, Johnny Horton	2:20
12.	"Orange Blossom Special" (instrumental)	Ervin T. Rouse	2:16
13.	"He Stopped Loving Her Today"	Bobby Braddock, Curly Putman	3:50
14.	"I Don't Need Your Rockin' Chair" (with Mark Chesnutt and Tracy Lawrence)	Billy Yates, Frank Dycus, Kerry Kurt Phillips

== Personnel ==
- Bobby Birkhead — drums
- James Buchanan — fiddle
- Mark Chesnutt — guest vocals on "I Don't Need Your Rocking Chair"
- Ron Gaddis — bass, harmony and backing vocals, duet vocals on "No Show Jones"
- Kent Goodson — keyboards, harmonica
- George Jones - lead vocals, acoustic guitar
- Tom Killen - pedal steel guitar
- Tracy Lawrence — guest vocals on "I Don't Need Your Rocking Chair"
- Jerry Reid — electric guitar, acoustic guitar, harmony and backing vocals

== Chart performance ==
Chart (1999)	Peak position
U.S. Billboard Top Country Albums	72
