= Too Wild Too Long =

Studio album by George Jones
- Released: 1987
- Studio: Eleven Eleven Studio, Nashville, Tennessee
- Genre: Country
- Length: 31:53
- Label: Epic
- Producer: Billy Sherrill

George Jones chronology
Wine Colored Roses (1986)	Too Wild Too Long (1987)	One Woman Man (1989)

Singles from George Jones Sings More New Favorites
- 1. "The Bird" Released: December 18, 1987; 2. "I'm a Survivor" Released: March 22, 1988; 3. "The Old Man No One Loves" Released: May 11, 1988

Professional ratings
Review scores
Source	Rating
AllMusic	3/5 stars

Too Wild Too Long is an album by American country music artist George Jones released in 1987 on the Epic Records label.

Hank Williams Jr. covered "The U.S.A. Today" on his 1990 album, Lone Wolf.

== Track listing ==
No.	Title	Writer(s)	Length
1.	"I'm a Survivor"	Jim McBride, Keith Stegall	3:07
2.	"The Real McCoy"	Ken Martin, Curt Ryle	2:24
3.	"Too Wild Too Long"	Troy Seals, Eddie Setser	3:14
4.	"One Hell of a Song"	Skip Ewing, Mark Sherrill	3:10
5.	"The Old Man No One Loves"	Wyman Asbill	3:59
6.	"The Bird"	Dennis Knutson, A.L. "Doodle" Owens	2:50
7.	"I'm a Long Gone Daddy"	Hank Williams	2:50
8.	"New Patches"	Tommy Collins	3:09
9.	"Moments of Brilliance"	Richard D. Burt	3:15
10.	"The U.S.A. Today"	Ron Hellard, Johnny MacRae	3:14
