= The Old Man No One Loves =

Single by George Jones

from the album Too Wild Too Long
- B-side: "One Hell of a Song"
- Released: 1988
- Recorded: 1988
- Genre: Country
- Length: 4:03
- Label: Epic
- Songwriter: Wyman Asbill
- Producer: Billy Sherrill

George Jones singles chronology
"I'm a Survivor" (1988)	"The Old Man No One Loves" (1988)	"If I Could Bottle This Up" (1988)

"The Old Man No One Loves" is a song written by Wyman Asbill and recorded by George Jones for his 1988 LP Too Wild Too Long on Epic Records. It was released as the third single from the album but failed to make the Top 50, peaking at #63. The song pulls on the same heartstrings as Jones' biggest hit, "He Stopped Loving Her Today," complete with Billy Sherrill's sweeping production and a recitation recounting the protagonist's funeral. Jones also made his second music video for the song, the first having been "Who's Gonna Fill Their Shoes." "The Old Man No One Loves" was Jones' fourth consecutive single that failed to make the Top 25 on the Billboard country singles chart, which was beginning to be dominated by a new generation of country singers.

== Chart performance ==
Chart (1988)	Peak position
U.S. Billboard Hot Country Singles	63
