= I Am What I Am (George Jones album) =

Studio album by George Jones
- Released: September 8, 1980
- Recorded: February 1980
- Studios: Columbia Studio B, Nashville
- Genre: Country
- Length: 28:15
- Label: Epic
- Producer: Billy Sherrill

George Jones chronology
| Double Trouble (1980) | I Am What I Am (1980) | Together Again (1980) |

Singles from I Am What I Am
- 1. "He Stopped Loving Her Today" Released: April 14, 1980; 2. "I'm Not Ready Yet" Released: August 1980; 3. "If Drinkin' Don't Kill Me (Her Memory Will)" Released: January 1981

I Am What I Am is an album by American country music artist George Jones, released in 1980 on Epic Records label. On July 4, 2000, the CD version was reissued with four previously unreleased bonus tracks on the Legacy Recordings label.

== Reception ==
Professional ratings
Review scores
| Source | Rating |
|---|---|
| AllMusic | 5/5 stars |
| Robert Christgau | A− |

I Am What I Am peaked at number 7 on the Billboard country album charts, his first top 10 album in five years, and even appeared on the Billboard Top 200 at 132.

The Boston Globe determined that Jones "is unquestionably in top form throughout this work, with effective production by Billy Sherrill which enhances the singer's pure country delivery." Stephen Thomas Erlewine of AllMusic wrote that "the production is commercial without being slick, the songs are balanced between aching ballads and restrained honky tonk numbers, and Jones gives a nuanced, moving performance...like the best country music, these are lived-in songs that are simple, direct, and emotionally powerful, even with the smooth production."

I Am What I Am was ranked 14th on Rolling Stones' 2022 list of the 100 Greatest Country albums.

== Track listing ==
| No. | Title | Writer(s) | Length |
|---|---|---|---|
| 1. | "He Stopped Loving Her Today" | Bobby Braddock, Curly Putman | 3:19 |
| 2. | "I've Aged Twenty Years in Five" | Bob Parrish, Curtis Gordon | 3:19 |
| 3. | "Brother to the Blues" | Ed Rowell | 2:53 |
| 4. | "If Drinkin' Don't Kill Me (Her Memory Will)" | Harlan Sanders, Rick Beresford | 3:13 |
| 5. | "His Lovin' Her Is Gettin' in My Way" | "Wild" Bill Emerson | 2:32 |
| 6. | "I'm Not Ready Yet" | Tom T. Hall | 3:00 |
| 7. | "I'm the One She Missed Him with Today" | A.L. "Doodle" Owens | 3:02 |
| 8. | "Good Hearted Woman" | Waylon Jennings, Willie Nelson | 3:00 |
| 9. | "A Hard Act to Follow" | Earl Montgomery, George Jones | 2:07 |
| 10. | "Bone Dry" | Dennis Linde, Don Devaney | 2:18 |

CD bonus tracks (2000 Expanded Edition)
| No. | Title | Writer(s) | Length |
|---|---|---|---|
| 11. | "I'm a Fool for Loving Her" | Jimmy Tipton | 3:26 |
| 12. | "Am I Losing Your Memory or Mine?" | Dave Kirby, Red Lane | 3:35 |
| 13. | "The Ghost of Another Man" | Roger Bowling, Frank Dycus, George Richey | 3:09 |
| 14. | "It's All in My Mind" | Wynn Stewart, Vern Stovall | 2:44 |

== Personnel ==
- George Jones – vocals
- Billy Sanford – guitar
- Pete Wade – guitar
- Phil Baugh – guitar
- Pete Drake – pedal steel guitar
- Henry Strzelecki – bass guitar
- Jerry Carrigan – drums
- Hargus "Pig" Robbins – piano
- Charlie McCoy – harmonica
- Bob Moore – upright bass
- Bob Wray – bass guitar

== Charts ==
=== Weekly charts ===
| Chart (1980–1981) | Peak position |
|---|---|
| US Billboard 200 | 132 |
| US Top Country Albums (Billboard) | 7 |

=== Year-end charts ===
| Chart (1981) | Position |
|---|---|
| US Top Country Albums (Billboard) | 6 |
| Chart (1982) | Position |
| US Top Country Albums (Billboard) | 17 |

== Certifications ==
| Region | Certification |
|---|---|
| Canada (Music Canada) | Gold |
| United States (RIAA) | Platinum |
