= Ladies' Choice (George Jones album) =

Studio album by George Jones
- Released: May 1984
- Genre: Country
- Label: Epic
- Producer: Billy Sherrill

George Jones chronology
You've Still Got a Place in My Heart (1984)	Ladies' Choice (1984)	By Request (1984)

Singles from Ladies' Choice
- 1. "She's My Rock" Released: August 1984; 2. "Hallelujah, I Love You So" Released: December 1984; 3. "Size Seven Round (Made of Gold)" Released: April 1985

Ladies' Choice is an album by American country music artist George Jones, released in 1984 on the Epic Records label. It was composed largely of duets with female artists.

== Background ==
Ladies' Choice was Jones's fifth album of duets in five years, beginning with My Very Special Guests (1979), Double Trouble with Johnny Paycheck (1980), Together Again with Tammy Wynette (1980), and A Taste of Yesterday's Wine with Merle Haggard (1982). The singer had also scored a top ten duet with Ray Charles on "We Didn't See A Thing" in 1983, a single that also featured guitar solos from Chet Atkins. Jones's fondness for the duet stretched back to the beginning of his career when, in 1957, he recorded "Yearning", with Jeanette Hicks. He had also recorded hits with Melba Montgomery and, most famously, Wynette. In the liner notes to the 2005 Sony reissue of the album, the singer states, "The fans just react to a man and woman singing a powerful ballad together. When you perform a duet with a woman, she should sing the lead and the man should sing harmony. Of course, there are exceptions...You know, I don't really fall in love with all them girl singers - I fall in love with their singing!"

== Recording ==
For the most part, Ladies' Choice pairs the singer up with up and coming female vocalists, although the album is noteworthy for featuring Jones's only duet with fellow country icon Loretta Lynn. Ironically, the most famous song on the album was not a duet; the opening track, "She's My Rock", written by Gene Dobbins and sung by George as a tribute to his wife Nancy, rose to number 2 on the country singles chart. Nancy was the crucial influence in helping Jones turn his life around and stop drinking, which by this time the singer wanted to do. As he later recalled to The Texas Monthly in 1994, "Well it was either quit or die. And I surely didn’t want to die, so I made up my mind to quit."

"She's My Rock" is a cover of a song recorded by country music artist Stoney Edwards on his 1973 album, She's My Rock. "Hallelujah, I Love You So" is a cover of the 1956 Ray Charles classic "Hallelujah, I Love Her So". "All I Want to Do in Life" is a cover of a song recorded by country music artist Lee Conway on his 1977 album, All I Want to Do....

Many of the songs would be included on the expanded reissue of My Very Special Guests in 2000.

== Reception ==
The LP was not a commercial success, peaking at number 25 on the Billboard country albums chart. The one solo track on the album, "She's My Rock," was a major success, peaking at No. 2 for three weeks on the Billboard Hot Country Singles chart in December 1984. "Hallelujah, I Love You" is a duet with Brenda Lee that peaked at No. 15 on the Country singles charts. "Size Seven Round (Made of Gold)" is a duet with Lacy J. Dalton that hit No. 19 on the Country singles charts.

== Critical reception ==
Professional ratings
Review scores
Source	Rating
AllMusic	2/5 stars

The album was not well-received critically, with criticism coming both when the album was released and with online-based music critics. Chris Woodstra of AllMusic contends that "rarely does this album strike anything above average" and believes "more than likely this was a marketing decision to pair the old-school singer with the up-and-coming country ladies of the '80s." Jones biographer Bob Allen deems the collection "faintly interesting".

== Track listing ==
No.	Title	Writer(s)	Duet partner	Length
1.	"She's My Rock"	Sharon K. Dobbins
2.	"Hallelujah, I Love You So"	Ray Charles	Brenda Lee
3.	"All I Want to Do in Life"	Allen Reynolds, Sandy Mason Theoret	Janie Fricke
4.	"We Sure Make Good Love"	Mark Sherrill, Becky Hobbs	Loretta Lynn
5.	"Daisy Chain"	Dennis Knutson, Eddie Burton, Roger Alan Wade	Barbara Mandrell
6.	"All Fall Down"	Harlan Howard, Ron Peterson	Emmylou Harris
7.	"Size Seven Round (Made of Gold)"	Monroe Fields, Gary Lumpkin	Lacy J. Dalton
8.	"Our Love Was Ahead of Its Time"	Deborah Allen, Bobby Braddock	Deborah Allen
9.	"Slow Burning Fire"	Jan Buckingham, Vicki Smith	Terri Gibbs
10.	"Best Friends"	Hank Cochran, Leona Williams	Leona Williams
