= New Sunrise (Brenda Lee album) =

Studio album by Brenda Lee
- Released: November 1973
- Genres: Country; Countrypolitan
- Label: MCA

Brenda Lee chronology
Brenda (1973)	New Sunrise (1973)	Brenda Lee Now (1974)

Singles from New Sunrise
- 1. "Sunday Sunrise" Released: July 1973; 2. "Wrong Ideas" Released: December 1973

New Sunrise is the twenty-third studio album by American singer Brenda Lee. It was released in November 1973 by MCA Records and was her twenty-third studio album. The album was released in the wake of Lee's reinvention as a country music recording artist during the 1970s. Two of its tracks were singles that made the top ten on the US and Canadian country charts: "Sunday Sunrise" and "Wrong Ideas". The album itself made the US country top ten while the disc received mixed reviews from critics.

== Background, recording and content ==
Brenda Lee had a string of pop singles during the 1960s and was among the decade's best-selling music artists. With producer, Owen Bradley, songs like "I'm Sorry" and "Fool No. 1" became hit songs but as the decade progressed, her popularity waned. Lee then experimented with new styles and producers before returning to working with Bradley in the early 1970s. Bradley helped revitalize her career and transitioned her towards the country music market with songs like the top ten single, "Sunday Sunrise". The song was included on her 1973 album, New Sunrise. The project was a collection of 11 songs. Similar to her previous album projects, the track listing included cover tunes like "You Are the Sunshine of My Life" and Paul McCartney's "My Love". Although Bradley served as Lee's producer during this period, he is not credited on the project. The production of the album was considered country due to its traditional musical instrumentation.

== Critical reception ==
Professional ratings
Review scores
Source	Rating
AllMusic	2.5/5 stars

New Sunrise received mixed reviews following its release. Billboard magazine praised the project, writing, "How does she do it? Every song she sings, every album she puts together surpasses the one before, and no one can sing quite like Brenda." Cash Box also gave the album positive feedback, highlighting Lee's characteristic vocal performance and the choices in songs. Meanwhile, AllMusic's Greg Adams only gave the album two and a half stars out of five, finding that its two singles were "performed equally well", but found that the majority of the track listing was similar to the layout of her previous 1960s discs.

== Release, chart performance and singles ==
New Sunrise was released by MCA Records in November 1973 and was Lee's twenty third studio album. It was distributed as a vinyl LP or as an 8-track cartridge. The project was the second of Lee's to make the US Billboard Top Country Albums survey. Making its debut on December 1, 1973, the project spent 25 weeks on the chart, rising to the number seven position on April 6, 1974. It became her second consecutive top ten album on the survey and one of five to do so. Two singles were included on New Sunrise, the first being "Sunday Sunrise", which MCA first issued in July 1973. It became her second top ten single on the US country songs chart, rising to number six in 1973. It reached a similar position on Canada's Country Tracks chart, peaking at number eight. The second single was "Wrong Ideas", which MCA released in December 1973. The song also reached the number six on the US country chart, while climbing to number five on the Canadian country chart.

== Track listing ==
Side one
No.	Title	Writer(s)	Length
1.	"Sunday Sunrise"	Mark James	2:32
2.	"My Love"	Paul McCartney; Linda McCartney	2:59
3.	"You Are the Sunshine of My Life"	Stevie Wonder	3:06
4.	"Must I Believe"	Eddie Polo	2:25
5.	"Wrong Ideas"	Shel Silverstein	3:08
6.	"We Had It All"	Troy Seals; Donnie Fritts	2:46

Side two
No.	Title	Writer(s)	Length
1.	"Everybody's Had the Blues"	Merle Haggard	2:06
2.	"Why Me"	Kris Kristofferson	2:58
3.	"Slippin' Away"	Bill Anderson	2:28
4.	"You're My Man Again"	Burt Holiday; Sidro Garcia	2:24
5.	"Something for a Rainy Day"	Ronal McCown	2:54

== Technical personnel ==
All credits are adapted from the liner notes of New Sunrise.

- DWJ – Lacquer cut
- LaWayne Satterfield – Liner notes
- Dennis Carney – Photography

== Chart performance ==
Chart (1973–1974)	Peak position
US Top Country Albums (Billboard)	3

== Release history ==
Release history and formats for New Sunrise
Region	Date	Format	Label	Ref.
Various	November 1973	Vinyl LP; 8-track cartridge	MCA Records	
Various	Circa 1974	Vinyl LP; 8-track cartridge	MCA Records	
Various	Circa 2026	Music download; streaming	MCA Nashville	
