= One Woman Man =

Studio album by George Jones
- Released: February 28, 1989
- Recorded: 1988
- Studios: Eleven Eleven Sound Studios, Nashville, TN
- Genre: Country
- Length: 30:35
- Label: Epic
- Producer: Billy Sherrill

George Jones chronology
Too Wild Too Long (1987)	One Woman Man (1989)	You Oughta Be Here with Me (1990)

Singles from One Woman Man
- 1. "I'm a One-Woman Man" Released: November 1988; 2. "The King Is Gone (So Are You)" Released: April 29, 1989; 3. "Writing on the Wall" Released: July 1989; 4. "Radio Lover" Released: November 1989

One Woman Man is an album by American country music artist George Jones, released on February 28, 1989, on Epic Records.

== Reception ==
One Woman Man received positive reviews and rose to No. 13 on the Billboard Country Albums chart. Brian Mansfield of AllMusic calls it "One of Jones' best Epic albums." In his book George Jones: The Life and Times of a Honky Tonk Legend, biographer Bob Allen writes that Jones "seemed to briefly rediscover the old honky-tonk fervor he'd misplaced in middle age. The entire LP...was firmly anchored in the honky-tonk spirit."

Spin wrote, "That amazingly rangy voice is still all there, elevating Billy Sherrill's sappy production and the somewhat vapid material to undeserved heights. In case you don't know it, George Jones is the greatest white singer in the world."

Professional ratings
Review scores
Source	Rating
AllMusic	3/5 stars
The Rolling Stone Album Guide	3.5/5 stars

== Track listing ==
No.	Title	Writer(s)	Length
1.	"I'm a One Woman Man"	Johnny Horton, Tillman Franks	2:17
2.	"My Baby's Gone"	Hazel Houser	3:24
3.	"Don't You Ever Get Tired (Of Hurting Me)"	Hank Cochran	2:46
4.	"Burning Bridges"	Walter Scott	2:40
5.	"The King Is Gone (So Are You)"	Roger D. Ferris	3:22
6.	"Radio Lover"	Ron Hellard, Bucky Jones, Curly Putman	3:27
7.	"A Place in the Country"	Sanford Clark, Johnny MacRae, Bob Morrison	4:02
8.	"Just Out of Reach"	Virgil "Pappy" Stewart	2:59
9.	"Writing on the Wall"	Bruce Delaney, Bobby Fischer, Freddy Weller	2:55
10.	"Pretty Little Lady from Beaumont Texas"	Dennis Knutson, A.L. "Doodle" Owens	2:36

== Chart performance ==
=== Weekly charts ===
Chart (1989)	Peak position
Canadian Country Albums (RPM)	21
US Top Country Albums (Billboard)	13

=== Year-end charts ===
Chart (1989)	Position
US Top Country Albums (Billboard)	41
