= I Turn to You =

I Turn to You may refer to:

- I Turn to You (album), by Richie McDonald, or the title song, 2008
- I Turn to You, an album by Ahmad Hussain, 2010
- "I Turn to You" (All-4-One song), 1997; covered by Christina Aguilera, 1999
- "I Turn to You" (George Jones song), 1987
- "I Turn to You" (Melanie C song), 2000

== See also ==
- "Turn to You", a song by the Go-Go's, 1984
- "Turn to You (Mother's Day Dedication)", a song by Justin Bieber, 2012
