= List of awards and nominations received by George Jones =

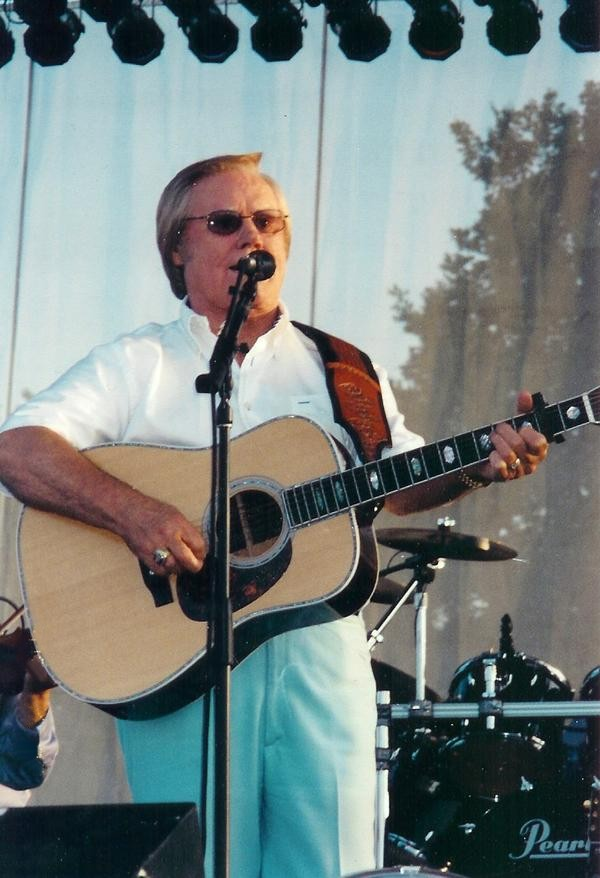
Jones performing at Harrah's Metropolis in Metropolis, Illinois in June 2002.

List of country music artist George Jones' awards:

== Awards ==
Year	Award	Awards	Notes
1956	Most Promising New Country Vocalist	Billboard	
1962	Most Promising New Country Vocalist	Country Music D.J. Convention	
1962	Male Vocalist of the Year	Cash Box	
1962	Male Vocalist of the Year	Billboard	
1963	Male Vocalist of the Year	Country Music D.J. Convention	
1963	Male Vocalist of the Year	Cash Box	
1963	Male Vocalist of the Year	Billboard	
1970	Walkway of Stars at the Country Music Hall Of Fame	Country Music Hall of Fame	
1972	Top Vocal Duo	Cash Box	with Tammy Wynette
1973	Top Vocal Duo	Cash Box	with Tammy Wynette
1976	Top Duet	Cash Box	with Tammy Wynette
1980	Grammy for Best Male Country Vocal Performance for "He Stopped Loving Her Today"	Grammy	
1980	Male Vocalist of the Year	Academy of Country Music	
1980	Male Vocalist of the Year	CMA	
1980	"He Stopped Loving Her Today" Song of the Year	CMA	
1980	"He Stopped Loving Her Today" Single of the Year	CMA	
1981	Male Vocalist of the Year	CMA	
1981	"He Stopped Loving Her Today" Song of the Year	CMA	Won "Song of the Year" two years in a row.
1981	Male Vocalist of the Year	Music City News	
1981	"He Stopped Loving Her Today" Single of the Year	Music City News	
1986	Music Video of the Year: "Who's Gonna Fill Their Shoes"	CMA	
1987	Living Legend	Music City News	
1992	"He Stopped Loving Her Today" Voted All-Time Country Song		
1992	Inducted into the Country Music Hall of Fame	Country Music Hall of Fame	
1993	The Pioneer Award	Academy of Country Music	
1993	Vocal Event of the Year: "I Don't Need Your Rockin' Chair"	CMA	with Garth Brooks, Joe Diffie, Pam Tillis, T. Graham Brown, Mark Chesnutt, Travis Tritt, Vince Gill, Alan Jackson, Patty Loveless, and Clint Black
1995	Vocal Collaboration of the Year: "A Good Year for the Roses" with Alan Jackson	TNN/Music City News	
1998	Hall of Fame Award for "She Thinks I Still Care"	Grammy	
1998	Vocal Event of the Year: "You Don't Seem to Miss Me"	CMA	with Patty Loveless
1999	Grammy for Best Male Country Vocal Performance for "Choices"	Grammy	
2001	Vocal Event of the Year: "Too Country"	CMA	with Brad Paisley, Bill Anderson, and Buck Owens
2002	U.S. National Medal of Arts	National Endowment of the Arts	
2003	Ranked #3 of the 40 Greatest Men of Country Music	CMT	
2007	The key to the city of Corpus Christi, Texas	The city of Corpus Christi, Texas	
2007	Grammy Hall of Fame Award for "He Stopped Loving Her Today"	Grammy	
2008	Kennedy Center Honoree	Kennedy Center Awards, Washington, D.C.	
2010	Inducted into the Texas Country Music Hall Of Fame	Texas Country Music Hall Of Fame, Carthage, TX	inducted along with Ray Winkler and Al Dexter

== See also ==
- George Jones
- Academy of Country Music
- List of country musicians
- Country Music Association
- List of best-selling music artists
- Inductees of the Country Music Hall of Fame (1992 Inductee)
