= Burning Bridges (Glen Campbell album) =

Studio album by Glen Campbell
- Released: June 1967
- Studio: Capitol (Hollywood)
- Genre: Country
- Length: 26:10
- Label: Capitol
- Producer: Al De Lory, Steve Douglas, Nick Venet

Glen Campbell chronology
The Big Bad Rock Guitar of Glen Campbell (1965)	Burning Bridges (1967)	Gentle on My Mind (1967)

Professional ratings
Review scores
Source	Rating
Allmusic	3.5/5 stars

Burning Bridges is the fifth studio album by American singer-guitarist Glen Campbell, released in 1967 by Capitol Records.

== Track listing ==
Side 1

1. "Burning Bridges" (Walter Scott) – 2:28
2. "Just to Satisfy You" (Waylon Jennings, Don Bowman) – 2:25
3. "Summer, Winter, Spring and Fall" (Roy Drusky, Julie McAlpine) – 2:29
4. "I'll Hold You in My Heart" (Eddy Arnold, Hall Horton, Tommy Dilbeck) – 2:25
5. "As Far As I'm Concerned" (Dale Parker) – 2:13
6. "Less of Me" (Glen Campbell) – 2:35

Side 2

1. "You've Still Got a Place in My Heart" (Leon Payne) – 2:28
2. "Too Late to Worry, Too Blue to Cry" (Al Dexter) – 2:30
3. "Old Memories Never Die" (Clyde Pitts, Carl Belew) – 2:16
4. "Faith" (Joe Johnson, Dick Glasser) – 2:04
5. "Together Again" (Buck Owens) – 2:17

== Personnel ==
Music

- Glen Campbell – vocals, acoustic guitar
- Al Casey – acoustic guitar
- Hal Blaine – drums
- Pete Jolly – piano
- Dennis Budimir – acoustic guitar
- Roy Caton – drums
- Larry Knechtel – piano
- Uncredited - bass

Production

- Al De Lory – producer
- Steve Douglas – producer
- Nick Venet – producer
- Leon Russell – arranger
- Ed Simpson/Capitol Photo Studio – photography

== Charts ==
Album – Billboard (United States)
Burning Bridges did not chart.

Singles – Billboard (United States)

Year	Single	Hot Country Singles	Hot 100	Easy Listening
1967	"Burning Bridges"	18	-	-
