= Size Seven Round (Made of Gold) =

Single by George Jones

from the album Ladies' Choice
- B-side: "All I Want to Do in Life"
- Released: 1985
- Recorded: 1984
- Genre: Country
- Length: 2:58
- Label: Epic
- Songwriter(s): Monroe Fields, Gary Lumpkin
- Producer(s): Billy Sherrill

George Jones singles chronology
"Hallelujah, I Love Her So" (1984)	"Size Seven Round (Made of Gold)" (1985)	"Who's Gonna Fill Their Shoes" (1985)

"Size Seven Round (And Made of Gold)" is a song by American country artists George Jones featuring Lacy J. Dalton. It was a minor hit in 1985, reaching #19 on the country Billboard survey. The song was included on Jones' 1984 LP Ladies' Choice and later on the 2005 Sony reissue of My Very Special Guests. Dalton would also appear on George's 1985 LP Who's Gonna Fill Their Shoes.

== Chart performance ==
Chart (1984)	Peak position
U.S. Billboard Hot Country Singles	19
Canadian RPM Country Tracks	11
