= Beef jerky (disambiguation) =

Beef jerky is a type of jerky, a lean meat that has been trimmed of fat, cut into strips, and then dried to prevent spoilage.

Beef jerky or Beef Jerky may also refer to:

- "Beef Jerky" (instrumental), 1974 song from the John Lennon album Walls and Bridges
- "Beef Jerky", song from The Jerky Boys album The Jerky Boys
- "Beef Jerky", song from Cibo Matto album Viva! La Woman
- "Beef Jerky", song from Glen Campbell album The Big Bad Rock Guitar of Glen Campbell
- Beef Jerky, a character in an episode of Quack Pack
