= Somebody Wants Me Out of the Way =

Single by George Jones

from the album Who's Gonna Fill Their Shoes
- B-side: "Call the Wrecker for My Heart"
- Released: April 1986
- Genre: Country
- Length: 3:18
- Label: Epic
- Songwriter(s): Dennis Knutson; A.L. "Doodle" Owens
- Producer(s): Billy Sherrill

George Jones singles chronology
"The One I Loved Back Then (The Corvette Song)" (1985)	"Somebody Wants Me Out of the Way" (1986)	"Wine Colored Roses" (1986)

"Somebody Wants Me Out of the Way" is a song written by Dennis Knutson and A.L. "Doodle" Owens and recorded by American country music artist George Jones. It was released in April 1986 as the third single from his album Who's Gonna Fill Their Shoes. The song peaked at number 9 on the Billboard Hot Country Singles chart. The song is very much in the tradition of George's previous hits "Still Doin' Time" and "If Drinkin' Don't Kill Me (Her Memory Will)" in that it is a hard "drinking song," but it's also a "cheatin'" song, with the narrator suspicious that "Somebody keeps paying my bar tab but the bartender won't tell me who." Jones delivers a soulful, bluesy vocal over a stone country arrangement with a prominent, shimmering acoustic guitar. The singer, who had been a notorious drinker, was sober by this time thanks to his wife Nancy, who had gotten his career back on track after years of mismanagement and missed concert dates.

== Chart performance ==
Chart (1986)	Peak position
US Hot Country Songs (Billboard)	9
Canadian RPM Country Tracks	20
