= Wine Colored Roses =

Studio album by George Jones
- Released: January 7, 1986
- Studio: Eleven Eleven Studio, Nashville, Tennessee
- Genre: Country
- Length: 29:40
- Label: Epic
- Producer: Billy Sherrill

George Jones chronology
Who's Gonna Fill Their Shoes (1985)	Wine Colored Roses (1986)	Too Wild Too Long (1987)

Singles from Wine Colored Roses
- 1. "Wine Colored Roses" Released: September 1986; 2. "The Right Left Hand" Released: January 1987; 3. "I Turn to You" Released: May 16, 1987

Professional ratings
Review scores
Source	Rating
Allmusic	2/5 stars

Wine Colored Roses is an album by American country music artist George Jones released in 1986 on the Epic Records label. It peaked at number 5 on the Billboard Country Albums chart. Wine Colored Roses went Gold in 1994.

== Track listing ==
No.	Title	Writer(s)	Length
1.	"Wine Colored Roses"	Dennis Knutson, A.L. "Doodle" Owens
2.	"I Turn to You"	Max D. Barnes, Curly Putman
3.	"The Right Left Hand"	Dennis Knutson, A.L. "Doodle" Owens
4.	"Don't Leave Without Taking Your Silver"	Damon Black
5.	"The Very Best of Me"	Gary Gentry, Mark Sherrill
6.	"Hopelessly Yours"	Don Cook, Curly Putman, Keith Whitley
7.	"You Never Looked That Good When You Were Mine" (with Patti Page)	Johnny MacRae, Bob Morrison
8.	"If Only Your Eyes Could Lie"	John Jarrard, Bob McDill
9.	"Ol' Frank"	Harlan Howard, Max D. Barnes
10.	"These Old Eyes Have Seen It All"	Curly Putman, Bucky Jones, Ron Hellard

== Chart performance ==
=== Album ===
Chart (1986)	Peak position
U.S. Billboard Top Country Albums	5

=== Singles ===
Year	Single	Peak chart positions	
Year	Single	US Country	CAN Country
1986	"Wine Colored Roses"	10	13
1987	"The Right Left Hand"	8	6
1987	"I Turn to You"	26	40

== Certifications ==
Region	Certification
United States (RIAA)	Gold
