= Jones Country =

Studio album by George Jones
- Released: 1983
- Genre: Country
- Label: Epic
- Producer: Billy Sherrill

George Jones chronology
Shine On (1983)	Jones Country (1983)	You've Still Got a Place in My Heart (1984)

Jones Country is an album by American country music artist George Jones released in 1983 on the Epic Records label.

== Track listing ==
No.	Title	Writer(s)	Length
1.	"Radio Lover"	Curly Putman, Ron Hellard, Bucky Jones	3:26
2.	"Dream On"	Dennis Lambert, Brian Potter	3:23
3.	"Hello Trouble"	Orville Couch, Eddie McDuff	2:26
4.	"Burning Bridges"	Walter Scott	2:39
5.	"Wino the Clown"	Curly Putman, Ron Hellard, Bucky Jones	3:51
6.	"You Must Have Walked Across My Mind Again"	Wayne Kemp, Warren Robb	2:54
7.	"I'd Rather Die Young"	Beasley Smith, Billy Vaughn, Randy Wood	2:51
8.	"Girl at the End of the Bar"	John Anderson, Lionel Delmore	3:26
9.	"One of These Days (But Not Tonight)"	Earl Montgomery	2:26
10.	"Famous Last Words"	Curly Putman, Ron Hellard, Bucky Jones	3:16
