= Tennessee Whiskey (song) =

1980 single by George Jones

Single by David Allan Coe

from the album Tennessee Whiskey
- B-side: "This Bottle (In My Hand)"
- Released: 1981
- Genre: Country
- Length: 2:59
- Label: Columbia
- Songwriters: Dean Dillon; Linda Hargrove
- Producer: Billy Sherrill

David Allan Coe singles chronology
"Stand by Your Man" (1981)	"Tennessee Whiskey" (1981)	"Dock of the Bay" (1981)

"Tennessee Whiskey" is an American country song written by Dean Dillon and Linda Hargrove. It was originally recorded by country artist David Allan Coe for his album of the same name, peaking at number 77 on the Billboard Hot Country Singles chart in 1981. George Jones' 1983 version of the song was included on his album Shine On, and reached number two on the Hot Country Singles chart.

The song has been covered by several artists, including Chris Stapleton, whose breakout performance of the song at the 49th Annual Country Music Association Awards with Justin Timberlake propelled the song to a greater level of popularity. Stapleton's version of the song has been certified double diamond by the Recording Industry Association of America (RIAA).

== Composition and David Allan Coe's recording ==
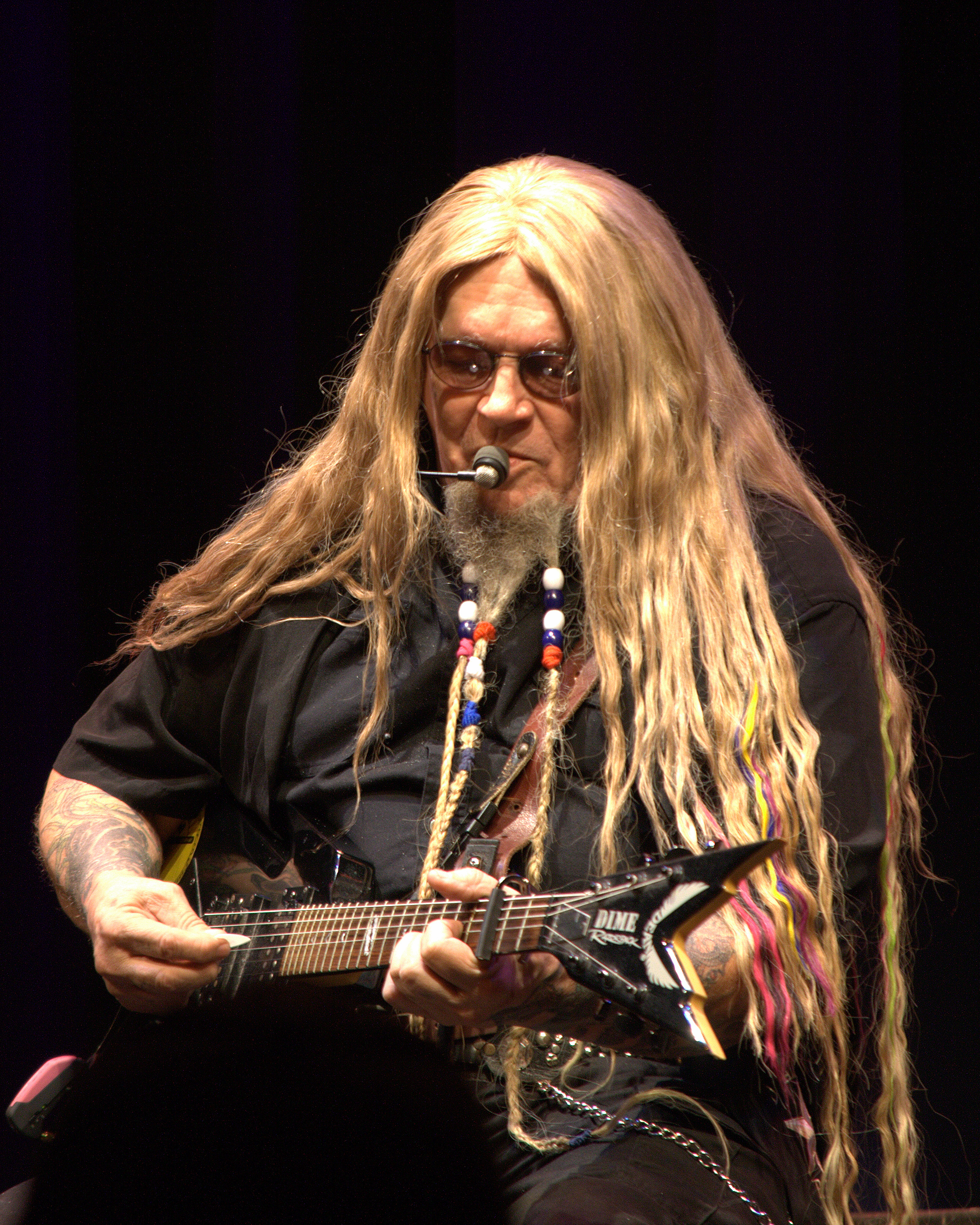
David Allan Coe first recorded the song.

"Tennessee Whiskey" was written in 1981 by Dean Dillon and Linda Hargrove. The pair decided to write a song together after meeting each other at the Bluebird Cafe in Nashville. He had an idea for it for some time, and they went back to Hargrove's house to write the song at 4:00 in the morning.

After completion, the song was first offered to George Strait, but he turned it down. It was first recorded by American country music artist David Allan Coe for his album Tennessee Whiskey released in 1981. His version is recorded in more of a traditional country style. Commercially, it peaked at number 77 on the US Billboard Hot Country Singles chart.

=== Charts ===
Chart (1981)	Peak position
US Hot Country Songs (Billboard)	77

== George Jones version ==
"Tennessee Whiskey"

Single by George Jones

from the album Shine On
- B-side: "Almost Persuaded"
- Released: August 1983
- Studio: Sound Emporium (Nashville, Tennessee)
- Genre: Country
- Length: 2:50
- Label: Epic
- Songwriters: Dean Dillon; Linda Hargrove
- Producer: Billy Sherrill

George Jones singles chronology
"I Always Get Lucky with You" (1983)	"Tennessee Whiskey" (1983)	"You've Still Got a Place in My Heart" (1984)

The song was later covered by fellow American country music artist George Jones, whose version was released in August 1983 as the third single from his album Shine On. Jones' version reached a new peak commercially, reaching number two on the Billboard Hot Country Singles chart in November 1983 and number one on the RPM Country Tracks chart in Canada.

The song remained a mainstay in Jones' live set, with the singer often substituting the name of whatever city or town he was in for "Tennessee" in the second chorus. In 1985, he performed the song at the inaugural Farm Aid, and Coe joined Jones onstage to sing a chorus.

=== Charts ===
Chart (1983)	Peak position
US Hot Country Songs (Billboard)	2
Canadian RPM Country Tracks	1

== Chris Stapleton version ==
"Tennessee Whiskey"

Promotional single by Chris Stapleton

from the album Traveller
- Released: April 27, 2015
- Genre: Country; country soul
- Length: 4:53
- Label: Mercury Nashville; Decca
- Songwriters: Dean Dillon; Linda Hargrove
- Producers: Dave Cobb; Chris Stapleton

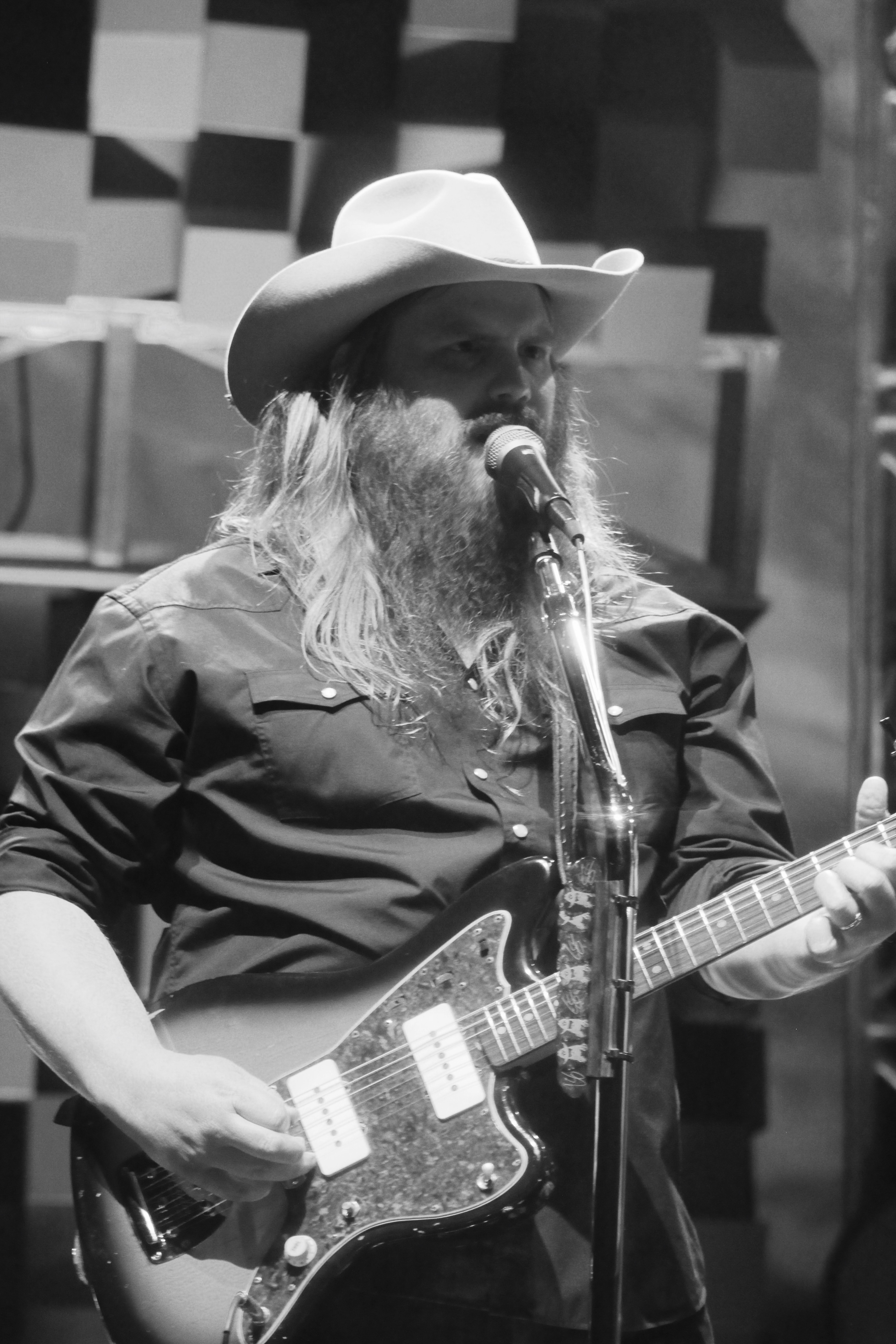
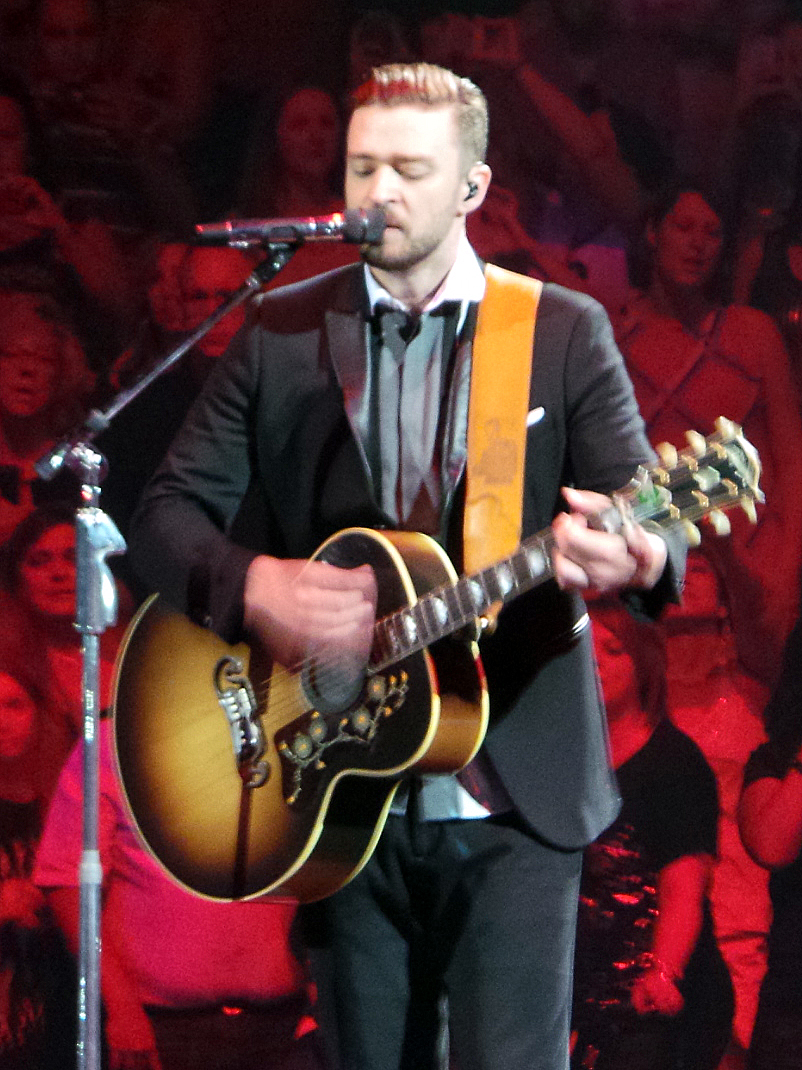
Music publications praised Chris Stapleton and Justin Timberlake's performance.

Stapleton first sang his version on the spur of the moment while the band was playing during a soundcheck before a show in Charlottesville, Virginia. Stapleton and the band enjoyed playing the song, and he decided to sing the song every show. His producer Dave Cobb heard the song and suggested that he should record the song for his album. His cover was never officially released to radio as a single, but it was released as a promotional CD single.

On November 4, 2015, Stapleton performed it at the 49th Annual Country Music Association Awards as a duet with Justin Timberlake. The performance was described as the best moment of the night by music writers. Based solely on two days' sales after the broadcast, it reached number one on the Hot Country Songs chart, and number 23 on the Billboard Hot 100, selling 131,000 copies. It peaked at number 20 on the Hot 100 the following week, selling a further 118,000 copies. It was certified platinum by the RIAA on May 4, 2016, and reached over a million in sales in the US by January 2017. It was certified double diamond by the RIAA on January 12, 2026, for 20 million units in combined streams and sales, the third song to achieve this milestone. It is the highest-certified country song in the US. It has sold 1.98 million copies in the US as of March 2020.

Stapleton and Timberlake also performed the song at the Pilgrimage Music & Cultural Festival and at the Man of the Woods Tour's Nashville concert. The song was nominated for ACM Song of the Year in 2017.

In 2024, Rolling Stone ranked Stapleton's rendition of the song at number 90 on its 200 Greatest Country Songs of All Time ranking.

=== Charts ===
Chart (2015–2017)	Peak position
Australia (ARIA)	70
Canada Hot 100 (Billboard)	39
New Zealand Heatseekers (RMNZ)	7
US Billboard Hot 100	20
US Country Airplay (Billboard)	57
US Hot Country Songs (Billboard)	1

Chart (2020–21)	Peak position
Global 200 (Billboard)	175

Chart (2024)	Peak position
Australia (ARIA)	62

==== Year-end charts ====
Chart (2015)	Position
US Hot Country Songs (Billboard)	89
Chart (2016)	Position
US Hot Country Songs (Billboard)	63
Chart (2017)	Position
US Hot Country Songs (Billboard)	98
Chart (2019)	Position
US Rolling Stone Top 100	92
Chart (2022)	Position
US Streaming Songs (Billboard)	19
Chart (2023)	Position
US Streaming Songs (Billboard)	50
Chart (2024)	Position
Australia (ARIA)	88

=== Certifications ===
Region	Certification	Certified units/sales
Australia (ARIA)	9× Platinum	630,000^{‡}
Brazil (Pro-Música Brasil)	Gold	30,000^{‡}
Canada (Music Canada)	Diamond	800,000^{‡}
Denmark (IFPI Danmark)	Gold	45,000^{‡}
New Zealand (RMNZ)	11× Platinum	330,000^{‡}
United Kingdom (BPI)	Platinum	600,000^{‡}
United States (RIAA)	2× Diamond	20,000,000^{‡}
^{‡} Sales+streaming figures based on certification alone.

== Other versions ==
Meghan Linsey performed the song on season 8 of The Voice in May 2015. Her version charted on the country chart after her performance with 32,000 copies sold that week. Deana Martin gave "Tennessee Whiskey" a new beat when she recorded it for her 2016 album Swing Street.

A YouTube video featuring Kris Jones at the wheel of his pickup truck, recorded by his daughter Dayla, went viral and has gained over 35 million views. It led to a performance on The Ellen DeGeneres Show. In 2017, Stan Walker and Parson James released a version as a single. Australian singer Judah Kelly covered the song on his debut album, Count On Me (2017). Keke Wyatt also covered the song in 2017 for her album of covers called Keke Covers where she did an R&B inspired version of the tune.

In 2017 Keala Settle released a version of "Tennessee Whiskey" on her EP Chapter One. It has gained 1.4 millions plays on Spotify.

Tommy Vext, formerly of Bad Wolves, recorded a cover on his covers album, Uncovered, Vol. 2 (2022).

T-Pain released a version of "Tennessee Whiskey" on his covers album On Top of the Covers (2023).

A video of Døvydas and Vere Hill singing the track has garnered almost 20 million views as of early 2023.

Jamal Roberts performed Tennessee Whiskey during the Showstopper round on American Idol on April 7, 2025. Roberts would go on to win Season 23 of American Idol.

=== Charts ===
==== Meghan Linsey ====
Chart (2015)	Peak position
US Bubbling Under Hot 100 (Billboard)	18
US Hot Country Songs (Billboard)	28

== In other media ==
In March 2018, it was announced that Tennessee Whiskey: The Musical, a play for Broadway and based on the story of Dean Dillon, is in the pre-production phase.

Stapleton's cover appears in George Clooney’s sci-fi film The Midnight Sky.

Stapleton's cover also appears in the pilot episode to the neo-western drama series Yellowstone.
