= You've Still Got a Place in My Heart =

Studio album by George Jones
- Released: 1984
- Studio: Eleven Eleven Studio, Nashville, Tennessee
- Genre: Country
- Label: Epic
- Producer: Billy Sherrill

George Jones chronology
Jones Country (1983)	You've Still Got a Place in My Heart (1984)	Who's Gonna Fill Their Shoes (1985)

Singles from You've Still Got a Place in My Heart
- 1. "You've Still Got a Place in My Heart" Released: March 1984

Professional ratings
Review scores
Source	Rating
Allmusic	3/5 stars

You've Still Got a Place in My Heart is an album by American country music artist George Jones released in 1984 on the Epic Records label.

== Track listing ==
No.	Title	Writer(s)	Length
1.	"You've Still Got a Place in My Heart"	Leon Payne
2.	"From Strangers, To Lovers, To Friends"	Hillman Hall, Glenn Ray
3.	"(What Love Can Do) The Second Time Around"	Joe Chambers, Larry Jenkins
4.	"Come Sundown"	Kris Kristofferson
5.	"Even the Bad Times Are Good"	Carl Belew, Clyde Pitts
6.	"I'm Ragged But Right"	George Jones
7.	"Courtin' in the Rain"	T. Texas Tyler
8.	"Loveshine"	Harlan Sanders
9.	"Your Lying Blue Eyes"	Ken McDuffie
10.	"Learning to Do Without Me"	A.L. "Doodle" Owens, Dennis Knutson, Buck Moore
