= Real: The Tom T. Hall Project =

1998 compilation album by various artists

Compilation album by Various Artists
- Released: December 8, 1998
- Recorded: 1995–1997
- Genre: Americana, alternative rock
- Length: 64:48
- Label: Sire/Delmore/Kickstand
- Producer: Various

Real: The Tom T. Hall Project is a 1998 tribute album that features a variety of artists' renditions of songs written by Tom T. Hall between the mid-1960s and the mid-1990s. It was conceived by independent producers Mark Linn and Justin Bass, and licensed to Sire Records Group.

== Reception ==
Music critic Clint West of Americana UK praised the album, noting: "On listening to the record, the first thing that strikes you is the richness and variety of the songs. Hall is equally comfortable using warmth, wit, comedy, tragedy and just about any other sentiment or emotion that you care to mention. The astute matching of artists to songs also contributes greatly to making this compilation work as both a showcase for Hall's songs, but also a vehicle for the artists themselves."

In the Chicago Reader, Peter Margasak wrote about the project's impact on Hall himself: "In the process, [Tom T. Hall] even became reacquainted with some of his early material: when Linn and Bass played him [Richard] Buckner's cover of 'When Love Is Gone,' recorded by Bobby Bare in the 70s, he responded, 'That's real pretty, but I didn't write that song.'"

== Track listing ==
No.	Title	Artist	Length
1.	"I Washed My Face in the Morning Dew"	Johnny Cash	3:24
2.	"That's How I Got to Memphis"	Kelly Willis	3:39
3.	"When Love Is Gone"	Richard Buckner	2:38
4.	"Don't Forget The Coffee Billy Joe"	R.B. Morris	3:27
5.	"Coffee, Coffee, Coffee"	Freedy Johnston	3:02
6.	"Old Enough To Want To (Fool Enough To Try)"	Jonny Polonsky	2:10
7.	"Ships Go Out"	Ron Sexsmith	2:44
8.	"I Miss A Lot Of Trains"	Iris DeMent	3:47
9.	"Tulsa Telephone Book"	Calexico	3:28
10.	"Harper Valley PTA"	Syd Straw & the Skeletons	2:52
11.	"Spokane Motel Blues"	Joel RL Phelps	4:28
12.	"Homecoming"	Joe Henry	5:45
13.	"The Water Lily"	Ralph Stanley featuring Ralph Stanley II	2:19
14.	"I'm Not Ready Yet"	Mary Janes	5:19
15.	"Candy In The Window"	Mary Cutrufello	4:04
16.	"I Hope It Rains At My Funeral"	Whiskeytown	7:29
17.	"It Sure Can Get Cold In Des Moines"	Mark Olson with Victoria Williams	3:31
Total length:			64:48
