= Sunday Sunrise (song) =

1973 song written by Mark James

Single by Brenda Lee

from the album New Sunrise
- B-side: "Must I Believe"
- Released: July 23, 1973
- Recorded: June 1973
- Genre: Country
- Label: MCA Records 40107
- Songwriter: Mark James
- Producer: Owen Bradley

Brenda Lee singles chronology
| "Nobody Wins" (1973) | "Sunday Sunrise" (1973) | "Wrong Ideas" (1974) |

"Sunday Sunrise"

Single by Anne Murray

from the album Together
- B-side: "Out on the Road Again"
- Released: 1975
- Genre: Country
- Length: 3:16
- Label: Capitol Records 4142
- Songwriter: Mark James
- Producer: Tom Catalano

Anne Murray singles chronology
| ""A Stranger in My Place" (Re-release)" (1975) | "Sunday Sunrise" (1975) | "The Call" (1976) |

"Sunday Sunrise" is a song written by Mark James and recorded by Brenda Lee and Anne Murray. Lee's version was a Top Ten U.S. and Canadian Country hit in 1973. Murray's rendition reached #13 on both the Canadian Adult Contemporary chart and the U.S. Adult Contemporary chart in 1975. The song appeared on Murray's 1975 album, Together and was produced by Tom Catalano.

The song is about the new hope that the dawning of the day brings.

== Brenda Lee version ==
Brenda Lee released a version in 1973 that reached No. 6 on the Hot Country Songs chart in October 1973. For Lee, it was the second single release of a song written by Mark James, the first being "Always On My Mind." With the song's top 10 placement on the chart, it marked back-to-back top 10 hits for Lee, the teen-aged pop star from the 1960s who had in the meantime developed a strong following among country fans; her previous single, the Kris Kristofferson-penned "Nobody Wins," reached No. 5 in May 1973.

== Chart performance ==
=== Brenda Lee ===
| Chart (1973) | Peak position |
|---|---|
| Canadian RPM Country Tracks | 8 |
| U.S. Country | 6 |

=== Anne Murray ===
| Chart (1975) | Peak position |
|---|---|
| Canadian RPM Adult Contemporary | 13 |
| U.S. Country | 49 |
| Billboard Hot 100 | 98 |
| U.S. Adult Contemporary | 13 |
