= Rock on Baby =

Single by Brenda Lee

from the album Brenda Lee Now
- B-side: "More Than a Memory"
- Released: October 1974
- Genre: Country
- Length: 2:43
- Label: MCA
- Songwriter(s): Johnny Wilson; Gene Dobbins

Brenda Lee singles chronology
| "Big Four Poster Bed" (1974) | "Rock on Baby" (1974) | "He's My Rock" (1975) |

"Rock on Baby" is a song originally recorded by American singer, Brenda Lee. It was released as a single in 1974 and reached the US country songs top ten chart in early 1975, becoming one of several country recordings that identified Lee with the country music market. The song received a positive response from music publications at the time of its release as well.

== Background, recording and content ==
Brenda Lee was one of music's top-selling recording artists in the 1960s, having a series of US top ten singles under the production of Owen Bradley. Lee was pressured to work with other producers towards the end of the decade but grew frustrated with the lack of success she had with other collaborators and instead reunited with Bradley in 1971. Her music became geared towards the country market and she had a series of US top ten country songs during this period. Among them was "Rock on Baby", which Lee described in her autobiography as "a salute to my bopping past" (in reference to her early work as a teenage rock and roll performer). Composed by Johnny Wilson and Gene Dobbins, "Rock on Baby" describes a woman who does not want to be held back from her romantic partner and chooses to leave them instead.

== Release, critical reception and chart performance ==
"Rock on Baby" was released as a single by MCA Records in October 1974 as a seven-inch vinyl record, featuring a B-side titled "More Than a Memory". It received a positive response from different publications following its release. Billboard named it one of its "Top Single Picks" in October 1974, writing, "Brenda mores into an up-tempo sound with a great rhythm and, as usual, she sings anything well. It's hit after hit." Cash Box wrote, "Brenda's distinctive voice lends a bit of sensuality to this number which is augmented by solid instrumentation and a strong chorus." Terry Hazlett of the Observer-Reporter newspaper also praised the track and believed the single could reach the rock popularity charts. "Rock on Baby" debuted on the US Billboard Hot Country Songs chart on November 2, 1974 and spent a total of 14 weeks there. On January 11, 1975, it peaked in the top ten, rising to the number six position. The song became Lee's fifth US top ten country single in her career. On Canada's RPM Country Tracks chart, the single rose into the top 20, peaking at number 17, becoming her eighth charting song there. It was also included on Lee's 1974 studio album, Brenda Lee Now.

== Track listing ==
7" vinyl single

- "Rock on Baby" – 2:43
- "More Than a Memory" – 3:17

== Charts ==
Weekly chart performance for "Rock on Baby"
| Chart (1974–1975) | Peak position |
|---|---|
| Canada Country Tracks (RPM) | 17 |
| US Hot Country Songs (Billboard) | 6 |
