= I'm Not Ready Yet =

Single by George Jones

from the album I Am What I Am
- B-side: "Garage Sale Today"
- Released: August 1980
- Genre: Country
- Length: 3:00
- Label: Epic
- Songwriter(s): Tom T. Hall
- Producer(s): Billy Sherrill

George Jones singles chronology
| "He Stopped Loving Her Today" (1980) | "I'm Not Ready Yet" (1980) | "If Drinkin' Don't Kill Me (Her Memory Will)" (1981) |

"I'm Not Ready Yet" is a song written by Tom T. Hall. It was originally released by The Blue Boys in 1968, whose version peaked at number 58 on the Billboard Hot Country Singles chart. The song was covered by American country music artist Tammy Wynette on her 1979 album, Just Tammy. It was most successfully covered by American country music artist George Jones on his 1980 album I Am What I Am. It was released in August 1980 as the album's second single following the monster smash "He Stopped Loving Her Today." Jones' version peaked at number 2 on the Billboard Hot Country Singles chart. As Rich Kienzle observes in the liner notes to the 1994 Sony compilation The Essential George Jones: The Spirit of Country, the Hall composition "seemed to also reflect on George's mortality though Hall's lyrics weren't originally conceived that way." The song was also covered by Indiana group the Mary Janes for the 1998 tribute album, Real: The Tom T. Hall Project.

== Chart performance ==
=== The Blue Boys ===
| Chart (1968) | Peak position |
|---|---|
| US Hot Country Songs (Billboard) | 58 |

=== George Jones ===
| Chart (1980) | Peak position |
|---|---|
| US Hot Country Songs (Billboard) | 2 |
| Canadian RPM Country Tracks | 4 |
