= Shine On (George Jones album) =

Studio album by George Jones
- Released: March 1983
- Studio: Sound Emporium (Nashville, Tennessee)
- Genre: Country
- Length: 29:47
- Label: Epic
- Producer: Billy Sherrill

George Jones chronology
Still the Same Ole Me (1981)	Shine On (1983)	Jones Country (1983)

Singles from Shine On
- 1. "Shine On (Shine All Your Sweet Love on Me)" Released: January 1983; 2. "I Always Get Lucky with You" Released: April 1983; 3. "Tennessee Whiskey" Released: August 1983

Shine On is an album by an American country music artist George Jones, released in March 1983 on the Epic Records label.

== Reception ==
Professional ratings
Review scores
Source	Rating
AllMusic	2.5/5 stars

Eugene Chadbourne of AllMusic calls Jones "a miracle worker vocally, shedding a light on the lyrics to 'She Hung the Moon' that is every bit as deep as moonlight, sounding every bit like a normal human being when he admits 'I'd Rather Have What We Had', and rising to the challenge of freshly performing a stale country chestnut, 'Almost Persuaded'."

== Track listing ==
No.	Title	Writer(s)	Length
1.	"Shine On (Shine All Your Sweet Love on Me)"	Bob Morrison, Johnny MacRae	3:18
2.	"She Hung the Moon"	Bobby Braddock	3:04
3.	"I'd Rather Have What We Had"	Bobby Braddock	2:50
4.	"Tennessee Whiskey"	Linda Hargrove, Dean Dillon	2:50
5.	"Almost Persuaded"	Billy Sherrill, Glenn Sutton	3:09
6.	"I Always Get Lucky with You"	Merle Haggard, Gary Church, Freddy Powers, Tex Whitson	3:18
7.	"Mem'ryville"	Dallas Frazier, Larry Lee	2:34
8.	"I Should've Called"	Eddy Raven	2:37
9.	"The Show's Almost Over"	Chuck Howard	3:18
10.	"Ol' George Stopped Drinkin' Today"	O. B. McClinton	2:50

== Personnel ==
- Bass guitar: Henry Strzelecki
- Dobro: Pete Drake
- Drums: Larrie Londin, Kenny Malone
- Guitar: Pete Bordonali, Billy Sanford, Bobby Thompson, Reggie Young
- Harmonica: Terry McMillan
- Keyboards: Bobby Ogdin, Hargus "Pig" Robbins
- Steel Guitar: Pete Drake, Weldon Myrick
