= Big Four Poster Bed =

Single by Brenda Lee

from the album Brenda Lee Now
- B-side: "Castles in the Sand"
- Released: 17 June 1974
- Recorded: 20 May 1974
- Studio: Bradley's Barn, Mount Juliet, Tennessee
- Genre: Country
- Length: 4:35
- Label: MCA Records 40262
- Songwriter(s): Shel Silverstein

Brenda Lee singles chronology
"Wrong Ideas" (1973)	"Big Four Poster Bed" (1974)	"Rock on Baby" (1974)

"Big Four Poster Bed" is a song written by Shel Silverstein and performed by Brenda Lee featuring the Nashville Sound. The song reached #4 on the U.S. country chart and #2 on the Canadian country chart in 1974. It was featured on her 1974 album, Brenda Lee Now.

== Song story ==
A sentimental tale, the song—as told through the eyes of a young woman—tells the story of a bed her father built with his own hands; the bed's frame and headboard are made of rough-cut pine, and on it lay a patchwork quilt and feather-downed pillows her mother made shortly before their wedding. The song recalls the future the newly married couple made for their future and their future family, as well as the stories of the girl's relationship with her father.

Later, her father falls ill and, in his last days, recalls many fond memories with his family as they keep a bedside vigil. After he dies, the woman remarks how at peace her father appeared to be lying in the bed he (literally) made.

In the final verse, the woman (now an adult) is about to take her wedding vows and ask her husband to uphold the same values of fidelity and trust her parents did, before spending their first night together in the same four-poster bed her father built years ago.
