= Wrong Ideas =

Single by Brenda Lee

from the album New Sunrise
- B-side: "Something For a Rainy Day"
- Released: December 1973
- Genre: Country
- Length: 3:08
- Label: MCA Records 40171
- Songwriter: Shel Silverstein

Brenda Lee singles chronology
"Sunday Sunrise" (1973)	"Wrong Ideas" (1973)	"Big Four Poster Bed" (1974)

"Wrong Ideas" is a song written by Shel Silverstein and performed by Brenda Lee. The song reached #6 on the U.S. country chart and #5 on the Canadian country chart in 1974. It was featured on her 1972 album, New Sunrise.
