= You've Still Got a Place in My Heart (song) =

1950 song by Leon Payne

- German release picture sleeve

Single by Dean Martin
- B-side: "Old Yellow Line"
- Released: 1968
- Genre: Traditional pop
- Length: 2:50
- Label: Reprise
- Songwriter: Leon Payne
- Producer: Jimmy Bowen

Dean Martin singles chronology
"In the Misty Moonlight" (1967)	"You've Still Got a Place in My Heart" (1968)	"April Again" (1968)

"You've Still Got a Place in My Heart"

Single by George Jones

from the album You've Still Got a Place in My Heart
- B-side: "I'm Ragged but I'm Right"
- Released: March 1984
- Genre: Country
- Length: 3:18
- Label: Epic
- Songwriter: Leon Payne
- Producer: Billy Sherrill

George Jones singles chronology
"Tennessee Whiskey" (1983)	"You've Still Got a Place in My Heart" (1984)	"She's My Rock" (1984)

"You've Still Got a Place in My Heart" is a song written and originally recorded by American country music artist Leon Payne in 1950.

In 1967, Dean Martin released a version of the song on the album Happiness Is Dean Martin. Martin released the song as a single in 1968, which spent 7 weeks on the Billboard Hot 100 chart, peaking at No. 60, while reaching No. 7 on Billboard's Easy Listening chart, and No. 44 on Canada's RPM 100.

In 1967, Glen Campbell released a version of the song as the B-side to "By the Time I Get to Phoenix" and on the album Burning Bridges.

It was covered by Con Hunley in 1978, whose version peaked at number 14 on the Billboard Hot Country Singles chart.

George Jones covered it on his 1984 album, You've Still Got a Place in My Heart and released it as a single, peaking at number 3 on the Billboard Hot Country Singles chart.

== Chart performance ==
=== Dean Martin ===
Chart (1968)	Peak position
US Billboard Hot 100	60
US Billboard Easy Listening	7
Canada - RPM 100	44

=== Con Hunley ===
Chart (1978)	Peak position
U.S. Billboard Hot Country Singles	14
Canadian RPM Country Tracks	20

=== George Jones ===
Chart (1984)	Peak position
U.S. Billboard Hot Country Singles	3
Canadian RPM Country Tracks	6
