= The King Is Gone (So Are You) =

Single by George Jones

from the album One Woman Man
- B-side: "Don't You Ever Get Tired (Of Hurting Me)"
- Released: April 29, 1989
- Genre: Country
- Length: 3:22
- Label: Epic
- Songwriter: Roger D. Ferris
- Producer: Billy Sherrill

George Jones singles chronology
"I'm a One Woman Man" (1988)	"The King Is Gone (So Are You)" (1989)	"Writing on the Wall" (1989)

"The King Is Gone (So Are You)", originally titled "Ya Ba Da Ba Do (So Are You)", is a song written by Roger D. Ferris, and recorded by American country music singer George Jones. It was released in April 1989 as the second single from the album One Woman Man.

== Content ==
The song is about a man who uses the occasion of a breakup to open a decanter shaped like Elvis Presley, and pour the Jim Beam whiskey therein into a Welch's jelly jar featruing The Flintstones character Fred Flintstone to drink it. He then imagines a conversation about women between himself, Presley and Flintstone.

== Release history ==
Initially, the composition had been titled "Ya Ba Da Ba Do (So Are You)" but the song's publisher altered the title prior to publication per the request of Hanna-Barbera, creators and owners of The Flintstones. Shortly after Columbia Records issued single, they also re-issued it with the original "Ya Ba Da Ba Do (So Are You)" title covered up with a "The King Is Gone (So Are You)" sticker and insisted that disc jockeys refer to the song by the altered title instead. Columbia Records also issued a press release indicating that Hanna-Barbera did not endorse the single.

== Chart performance ==
"The King Is Gone (So Are You)" charted on Hot Country Songs for 13 weeks starting in April 1989, peaking at number 26.

Chart (1989)	Peak position
US Hot Country Songs (Billboard)	26
Canadian RPM Country Tracks	31
