= Brenda Lee Now =

Studio album by Brenda Lee
- Released: November 1974
- Genres: Country; Countrypolitan
- Label: MCA
- Producer: Owen Bradley

Brenda Lee chronology
New Sunrise (1973)	Brenda Lee Now (1974)	Sincerely, Brenda Lee (1975)

Singles from Brenda Lee Now
- 1. "Big Four Poster Bed" Released: June 1974; 2. "Rock on Baby" Released: October 1974

Brenda Lee Now is the twenty-fourth studio album by American singer, Brenda Lee. It was released in November 1974 by MCA Records and was her twenty fourth studio album. A total of 11 tracks were included on the album, many of which were ballads and covers of songs from the era. It received mixed reviews from publications after its release. Two singles were featured on the product that made the top ten of the US and Canadian country charts: "Big Four Poster Bed" and "Rock on Baby".

== Background, recording and content ==
One of the best-selling music artists of the 1960s, Brenda Lee had a series of US (and international) top ten singles during the decade. Most of these songs were produced by Owen Bradley, but as the decade progressed, she was pressured into working with new collaborators. Ultimately, she became disappointed with other record producers and got permission to work with Bradley again in the early 1970s. Under Bradley's new direction, her music steered towards the country genre, and she had several more US country top ten hits. Among them were a pair of 1974 singles ("Big Four Poster Bed" and "Rock on Baby") that served as the focal point for 1974's Brenda Lee Now.

Produced entirely by Bradley, Brenda Lee Now contained 11 tracks in total, most of which were characterized as ballads. Among them were covers of songs like the Bee Gee's "Words" and Billy Preston's "Nothing from Nothing". In her autobiography, Lee recalled that Kris Kristofferson also became a "favorite source of material", which was the reason behind including two songs penned by him: "Please Don't Tell Me How the Story Ends" and "Enough for You".

== Critical reception ==
Professional ratings
Review scores
Source	Rating
AllMusic	2/5 stars

Brenda Lee Now received a mixed response from publications following its release. Billboard named it among its "Top Album Picks" in November 1974, writing, "Some are born with a silver spoon. Brenda was born with a golden voice, and she's been treating us with it since childhood. Class all the way through, and the great styling." Cash Box also gave the product a favorable response. "Ballads dominate here and Brenda gives the type of sensitive performances which are once again going to make her a vital force on the music scene. Outstanding tracks include 'Never My Love,' 'Please Don't Tell Me How the Story Ends,' 'Love Me For A Reason,' and 'Enough For You'." Online publication, AllMusic, only rated the album a total of two stars out fivve.

== Release and singles ==
Brenda Lee Now was released in November 1974 by MCA Records and was offered in two formats: a LP or an 8-track cartridge. Both of the album's singles made the US and Canadian country song charts. Its earliest single was "Big Four Poster Bed", which MCA issued in June 1974. It became Lee's fourth top ten single on the US Hot Country Songs chart, rising to number four that year. On Canada's RPM Country Tracks chart, it also became her fourth top ten single, peaking at number two in 1974. "Rock on Baby" was then issued as the next single in October 1974. It became her fifth US country songs top ten single, peaking at number six. It also reached number 17 on the Canadian country chart as well.

== Track listing ==
Side one
No.	Title	Writer(s)	Length
1.	"Rock on Baby"	Johnny Wilson; Gene Dobbins	2:43
2.	"Words"	Barry Gibb; Robin Gibb; Maurice Gibb	3:26
3.	"Nothing from Nothing"	Billy Preston; Bruce Fisher	2:45
4.	"Please Don't Tell Me How the Story Ends"	Kris Kristofferson	2:39
5.	"Castles in the Sand"	Randy Cullers; Alan Rush	2:39
6.	"Seeing You Again"	Jim Weatherly	2:59

Side two
No.	Title	Writer(s)	Length
1.	"Big Four Poster Bed"	Shel Silverstein	4:35
2.	"Never My Love"	Don and Dick Addrisi	2:41
3.	"More Than a Memory"	Ted Harris	3:19
4.	"Love Me for a Reason"	Johnny Bristol; W. Brown, Jr.; D. H. Jones, Jr.	2:59
5.	"Enough for You"	Kris Kristofferson	3:14

== Technical personnel ==
All credits are adapted from the liner notes of Brenda Lee Now and Billboard magazine.

- Owen Bradley – Producer
- Holiday Sisters – Backing vocals
- Bill McElhiney – String arrangements
- Nashville Sound – Backing vocals

== Release history ==
Release history and formats for Brenda Lee Now
Region	Date	Format	Label	Ref.
Various	November 1974	Vinyl LP; 8-track cartridge	MCA Records	
Various	1975	Vinyl LP; 8-track cartridge	MCA Records	
