= Burning Bridges (Jack Scott song) =

Single by Jack Scott

from the album What in the World's Come Over You
- B-side: "Oh, Little One"
- Released: March 1960
- Genre: Country, rockabilly
- Length: 2:40
- Label: Top Rank
- Songwriter: Walter Scott
- Producer: Sonny Lester

Jack Scott singles chronology
"What in the World's Come Over You" (1959)	"Burning Bridges" (1960)	"What Am I Living For" (1960)

"Burning Bridges" is a song written by Walter Scott, and best known for its 1960 recording by Jack Scott, which was a #3 hit in the US. This was the only hit song for composer Walter Scott, who was no relation to Jack Scott.

The song was originally recorded by a relatively obscure country act called The Home Towners in 1957, but did not chart. Recorded by Jack Scott in 1960, "Burning Bridges" reached No. 3 on the Billboard Hot 100, No. 5 on the U.S. R&B chart, and No. 32 on the UK Singles Chart in 1960. The single was produced by Sonny Lester. It was featured on his 1960 album What in the World's Come Over You.;

The song ranked No. 35 on Billboard magazine's Top 100 singles of 1960. The single's B-side, "Oh, Little One", reached No. 34 on the U.S. pop chart.

In Canada the two sides were co-charted, reaching No. 2.

A completely different “Burning Bridges”, with different lyrics by the Mike Curb Congregation (No. 34, Billboard Hot 100/No. 16, Adult Contemporary Chart), was featured in the 1970 Clint Eastwood movie, Kelly's Heroes.

== Other charting versions ==
- Glen Campbell released a version which reached No. 18 on the U.S. country chart in 1967.
- Jack Scott released a new version of the song with Carroll Baker in 1992 which reached No. 55 on the Canadian country chart.

== Other versions ==
- The Wilburn Brothers released a version of the song on their 1962 album City Limits.
- Sonny James released a version of the song on his 1964 album You're the Only World I Know.
- Billy Edd Wheeler released a version of the song as the B-side to his 1965 single "Tonight I'm Singing Just for You".
- Jan Howard released a version of the song on her 1967 album This Is Jan Howard Country.
- Connie Smith released a version of the song on her 1968 album Soul of Country Music.
- Terry Bradshaw released a version of the song on his 1976 album I'm So Lonesome I Could Cry.
- Jim Ed Brown and Helen Cornelius released a version of the song on their 1976 album I Don't Want to Have to Marry You.
- David Rogers released a version of the song as the B-side to his 1976 single "I'm Gonna Love You Right Out of This World".
- Connie Francis released a version of the song as a single in 1977, but it did not chart.
- Randy Barlow released a version of the song as the B-side to his 1978 single "No Sleep Tonight".
- George Jones released a version of the song on his 1983 album, Jones Country, and again in 1989 on his album, One Woman Man and as the B-side to his 1989 single "Writing on the Wall".
