= If Drinkin' Don't Kill Me (Her Memory Will) =

Single by George Jones

from the album I Am What I Am
- B-side: "Brother to the Blues"
- Released: January 1981
- Genre: Country
- Length: 3:13
- Label: Epic
- Songwriter(s): Harlan Sanders; Rick Beresford
- Producer(s): Billy Sherrill

George Jones singles chronology
"I'm Not Ready Yet" (1980)	"If Drinkin' Don't Kill Me (Her Memory Will)" (1981)	"Still Doin' Time" (1981)

"If Drinkin' Don't Kill Me (Her Memory Will)" is a song written by Harlan Sanders and Rick Beresford, and recorded by American country music artist George Jones. It was released in January 1981 as the third single from his album I Am What I Am. The song peaked at number 8 on the Billboard Hot Country Singles chart.

== Background ==
By 1981, Jones’ career continued to thrive after the remarkable success of his #1 hit single "He Stopped Loving Her Today." After experiencing a lull in his career in the late 1970s, the song reignited the singer's career on the charts; in 1980, he scored a #2 hit with "Two Story House," a duet with his ex-wife Tammy Wynette, and reached #2 again with his rendition of the Tom T. Hall composition "I'm Not Ready Yet." However, the upswing in his professional life brought little peace to his personal one; dogged by a years-old cocaine addiction and a nearly thirty-year drinking problem, he continued to miss shows, engage the police in high-speed chases, and arrive at award shows obviously inebriated to accept honors for "He Stopped Loving Her Today." The despairingly hopeless "If Drinkin' Don't Kill Me (Her Memory Will)" verged on topicality as Jones sang about falling out of cars at four in the morning and drinking "twenty bottles." As he often had, Jones played up to his demolished reputation with a mixture of sheepish bravado and showbiz practicality, writing in his 1995 memoir I Lived to Tell It All, "Knowing what people thought about Tammy and me, I often changed the words of 'If Drinkin' Don't Kill Me' when I sang it publicly, particularly on national television: If drinkin' don't kill me, Tammy's memory will...If folks bought my records because they thought I was breaking down, which I happened to be, so be it."

== Chart performance ==
Chart (1981)	Peak position
US Hot Country Songs (Billboard)	8
Canadian RPM Country Tracks	25
