= I Turn to You (George Jones song) =

Single by George Jones

from the album Wine Colored Roses
- B-side: "Don't Leave Without Taking Your Silver"
- Released: May 16, 1987
- Genre: Country
- Length: 2:38
- Label: Epic
- Songwriters: Max D. Barnes, Curly Putman
- Producer: Billy Sherrill

George Jones singles chronology
"The Right Left Hand" (1987)	"I Turn to You" (1987)	"The Bird" (1987)

"I Turn to You" is a song written by Max D. Barnes and Curly Putman, and recorded by American country music singer George Jones. It was released in May 1987 as the third single from the album Wine Colored Roses. It heralded a downturn for the singer on the country charts, failing to make the Top 25, and reflected the changes taking place in country music at the time as the "new traditionalist" movement, with younger country artists like Randy Travis, dominating radio airplay.

From 1993 to 2013, "I Turn to You" was chosen for re-release on four additional compilation albums by Sony Music Distribution, Madacity and IMG.

== Charts ==
Chart (1987)	Peak position
U.S. Billboard Hot Country Singles	26
Canadian RPM Country Tracks	40
