= Who's Gonna Fill Their Shoes =

Studio album by George Jones
- Released: August 1985
- Studio: Eleven Eleven Studio, Nashville, Tennessee
- Genre: Country
- Length: 29:37
- Label: Epic
- Producer: Billy Sherrill

George Jones chronology
You've Still Got a Place in My Heart (1984)	Who's Gonna Fill Their Shoes (1985)	Wine Colored Roses (1986)

Singles from Who's Gonna Fill Their Shoes
- 1. "Who's Gonna Fill Their Shoes" Released: June 8, 1985; 2. "The One I Loved Back Then (The Corvette Song)" Released: September 21, 1985; 3. "Somebody Wants Me Out of the Way" Released: April 1986

Professional ratings
Review scores
Source	Rating
Allmusic	link

Who's Gonna Fill Their Shoes is the 45th studio album by American country music artist George Jones, released in 1985 on the Epic Records label.

== Track listing ==
No.	Title	Writer(s)	Length
1.	"Who's Gonna Fill Their Shoes"	Max D. Barnes, Troy Seals	3:16
2.	"Just When"	Alan Rhody, Bill Caswell	3:12
3.	"The One I Loved Back Then (The Corvette Song)"	Gary Gentry	2:30
4.	"If I Painted a Picture"	Charles Browder, Leona Williams	2:47
5.	"If You Can Touch Her at All" (with Lynn Anderson)	Lee Clayton	3:28
6.	"Somebody Wants Me Out of the Way"	Dennis Knutson, A.L. "Doodle" Owens	3:18
7.	"A Whole Lot of Trouble for You"	George Jones, Dale Schultz	2:17
8.	"If Only You'd Love Me Again"	Dennis Knutson, Eddie Burton	3:00
9.	"Call the Wrecker for My Heart"	Randy Haspel	2:56
10.	"That's Good! That's Bad!" (with Lacy J. Dalton)	Michael Garvin, Ron Hellard	3:03

== Charts ==
=== Weekly charts ===
Chart (1985–1986)	Peak position
US Top Country Albums (Billboard)	6

=== Year-end charts ===
Chart (1986)	Position
US Top Country Albums (Billboard)	25
