= Radio Lover (song) =

1989 song by George Jones

Single by George Jones

from the album One Woman Man
- B-side: "Burning Bridges"
- Released: November 1989
- Genre: Country
- Length: 3:25
- Label: Epic
- Songwriters: Curly Putman, Ron Hellard, Bucky Jones
- Producer: Billy Sherrill

George Jones singles chronology
"Writing on the Wall" (1989)	"Radio Lover" (1989)	"Hell Stays Open (All Night Long)" (1990)

"Radio Lover" is a murder ballad written by Curly Putman, Ron Hellard, and Bucky Jones and recorded by American country music artist George Jones. Although originally recorded for his 1983 studio album Jones Country, it was released as the fourth single from his 1989 studio album One Woman Man.

== Background ==
"Radio Lover" is a murder ballad, playing on a recurring theme in country music: A husband who is frequently absent, the wife becoming unfaithful (due to loneliness and desperation for physical intimacy), the husband returning home unannounced to find his wife in the arms of another man and - in a fit of rage - killing both his wife and the man who was with her.

In "Radio Lover", the murderer is a disc jockey who works an evening shift. Despite assuring his wife on-air that he loves her, she turns to another man to meet her sexual needs. Then one night, he pre-records his show and decides to surprise her on their first anniversary. The song's recitation explains that the man killed them both, just as the pre-recorded sign-off giving his signature line that he loved his wife was playing.

"Radio Lover" was selected as the fourth and final single from Jones' 1989 album One Woman Man. The song had already been released six years earlier on the LP Jones Country, as was another One Woman Man track, "Burning Bridges". "Radio Lover" peaked at No. 62 on the Billboard country singles chart. Since the song's original release, "Radio Lover" has seen airplay on classic country radio stations.

== Critical reception ==
A review of the song in Billboard was positive, stating that "Jones tosses this well-paced radio tale out to the listener and, it's likely, up the chart."

== Chart performance ==
Chart (1989)	Peak position
US Hot Country Songs (Billboard)	62
Canadian RPM Country Tracks	83
