= The One I Loved Back Then (The Corvette Song) =

Single by George Jones

from the album Who's Gonna Fill Their Shoes
- B-side: "If Only You'd Love Me Again"
- Released: September 21, 1985
- Genre: Country
- Length: 2:30
- Label: Epic 05698
- Songwriter(s): Gary Gentry
- Producer(s): Billy Sherrill

George Jones singles chronology
"Who's Gonna Fill Their Shoes" (1985)	"The One I Loved Back Then (The Corvette Song)" (1985)	"Somebody Wants Me Out of the Way" (1986)

"The One I Loved Back Then (The Corvette Song)" is a song written by Gary Gentry, and recorded by American country music singer George Jones. It was released September 1985 as the second single from the album Who's Gonna Fill Their Shoes. The song peaked at number three on the Hot Country Singles.

== Content ==
The song focuses on man's fascination with fast cars and beautiful women, and certain "similarities" between the two, which is a common theme in old rock and roll recordings. The singer and his girlfriend are out for a leisure drive (in the singer's Corvette) when they stop at a convenience store to purchase beer and cigarettes. As the singer pays for his merchandise, the store clerk, supposedly noticing the singer's Corvette parked outside, tells the singer how he had one just like it in 1963 but it was taken away from him by "the man down at the bank" (supposedly the loan officer who repossessed his car). In the second verse, the singer offers the clerk his keys and offers him a chance to "take her for a spin," thinking the clerk is talking about his car. Clarifying the singer's misinterpretation, the clerk informs the singer that it's not the car he is talking about, but the singer's girlfriend, who is waiting out in the car.

The above-mentioned "similarities" are revealed in the song's chorus: "hotter than a two-dollar pistol," "the fastest thing around," "long and lean," "every young man's dream," "turned every head in town," "built and fun to handle."

The song was a fixture in Jones' live set in the 1980s and 1990s and appears on the 1999 LP Live with the Possum.

== Chart performance ==
Chart (1985–1986)	Peak position
US Hot Country Songs (Billboard)	3
Canadian RPM Country Tracks	2
