= Shine On (Shine All Your Sweet Love on Me) =

Single by George Jones

from the album Shine On
- B-side: "Memories of Mama"
- Released: January 1983
- Studio: Sound Emporium (Nashville, Tennessee)
- Genre: Country
- Length: 3:18
- Label: Epic
- Songwriter(s): Bob Morrison; Johnny MacRae
- Producer(s): Billy Sherrill

George Jones singles chronology
"Same Ole Me" (1982)	"Shine On (Shine All Your Sweet Love on Me)" (1983)	"I Always Get Lucky with You" (1983)

"Shine On (Shine All Your Sweet Love on Me)" is a song written by Johnny MacRae and Bob Morrison, and recorded by American country music artist George Jones. It was released in January 1983 as the first single from his album Shine On. The song peaked at number 3 on the Billboard Hot Country Singles chart. "Shine On" was Jones' sixth Top 10 solo hit in less than three years. The song also displayed some of the pop elements that producer Billy Sherrill would introduce into George's sound over the course of his next few albums.

== Chart performance ==
Chart (1983)	Peak position
US Hot Country Songs (Billboard)	3
Canadian RPM Country Tracks	8
