= The Big Bad Rock Guitar of Glen Campbell =

Studio album by Glen Campbell
- Released: September 1965
- Recorded: Capitol (Hollywood)
- Genre: Instrumental rock
- Length: 27:57
- Label: Capitol
- Producer: Steve Douglas

Glen Campbell chronology
The Astounding 12-String Guitar of Glen Campbell (1964)	The Big Bad Rock Guitar of Glen Campbell (1965)	Burning Bridges (1967)

The Big Bad Rock Guitar of Glen Campbell is the fourth studio album by American singer-guitarist Glen Campbell, released in 1965 by Capitol Records. A vocal chorus appears on many tracks, singing wordless melody lines; otherwise, the album is entirely instrumental.

== Track listing ==
Side 1

1. "Walk, Don't Run" (Johnny Smith) – 1:54
2. "Ticket to Ride" (John Lennon, Paul McCartney) – 2:18
3. "Steve's Shuck" (Steven D. Kreisman) – 2:42
4. "Spanish Shades" (Glen Campbell) – 2:34
5. "The Lone Arranger" (Billy Strange) – 2:07
6. "The James Bond Theme" (Monty Norman) – 2:17

Side 2

1. "It's Not Unusual" (Gordon Mills, Les Reed) – 2:11
2. "King of the Road" (Roger Miller) – 2:12
3. "Sassy" (Bill Pitman, Billy Strange) – 2:08
4. "Mr. Tambourine Man" (Bob Dylan) – 2:46
5. "Spring Mist" (Glen Campbell) – 2:13
6. "Beef Jerky" (Steven D. Kreisman) – 2:35

== Personnel ==
Music

- Glen Campbell – electric guitar

Production

- Steve Douglas – producer
- Billy Strange – arranger, conductor
- Joe Polito – engineer
