= Curtis Gordon =

American rockabilly singer

Curtis Gordon (July 27, 1927 – May 2, 2004) was an American rockabilly singer.

Gordon was heavily influenced by Ernest Tubb, Bob Wills, and Jimmie Rodgers as a child. He won a radio talent show as a teen and left high school to be the lead singer of his own band, which included fiddle player Jimmy Bryant. His parents demanded that he return to school and give up the band; he did so, though he moonlighted with a band called Pee Wee Mills & the Twilight Cowboys, who operated out of Gulfport, Mississippi. He formed a new Western swing band of his own at age 21 and began touring the Southeast United States. Gordon served in the Army briefly during the Korean War; while there he met Roger Miller, whom he later helped get signed.

In June 1952, an employee of RCA Victor heard Gordon playing in a contest in Atlanta and told executive Steve Sholes about him. Gordon signed with RCA soon after and began recording for the label in the fall. He appeared on the Grand Ole Opry and supported Ernest Tubb, Elvis Presley, and Hank Snow on tour. His records sold modestly, though they never charted; he remained on RCA for two years, and when his contract expired, he was snapped up by Mercury Records. Gordon's style changed while on Mercury, for a number of possible reasons. The label let him record much of his own material, he worked extensively with producer Pappy Daily, and the nascent rock & roll movement had changed tastes. His recordings of 1956-57 are a mix of Western swing, rock and roll, and straight country music.

He played regularly in Mobile, Alabama and toured the South sporadically. He recorded with Dollie Records at the end of the 1950s, his last major contract; he continued performing locally for some time after that. He ran a dance club in Georgia in the 1970s and returned to rockabilly performing in the 1980s as the Europeans revived it.

== Discography ==
Title	Catalog number
RCA Records
The Greatest Sin / You Ain’t Seen Nothin’ Yet	20-5062
If You Tell Me One More Lie / What’s A Little Pride	20-5182
Rocky Road Of Love / Rompin’ And Stompin’	20-5356
I Just Don’t Love You Anymore / Where You’d Get So Much Of	20-5461
Little Bo-Peep / Tell ‘Em No	20-5550
I’d Do It For You / You Crazy, Crazy Moon	20-5639
Divided Heart / Caffeine and Nicotine	20-5760
Baby, Baby Me / I’d Like To Tell To	20-5818
Mercury Records
Chopsticks Mambo / Don’t Trade	70538
Blue Lifetime / Baby, Please Come Home	70648
Sixteen / Cry, Cry	71121
Our Secret Rendezvous / Girl With A Future	70708
Too Young To Know / Hello, Old Broken Heart	70791
Draggin’ / Mobile, Alabama	70861
Play The Music Louder / Hey, Mr. Sorrow	70933
So Tired Of Crying / I Know My Baby’s Gone	71037
Sittin’ On Top / Out To Win Your Heart	71097
I Wouldn’t / Please Baby, Please	71183
Dollie Records
Oh, Lonely Heart / Each Time You Go	3276
From Memphis To New Orleans / For The Last Time	10050
