= She's My Rock =

1972 single by Stoney Edwards

Single by Stoney Edwards

from the album She's My Rock
- B-side: "I Won't Make It Through the Day"
- Released: October 1972
- Genre: Country
- Label: Capitol
- Songwriter: S. K. Dobbins
- Producers: Ken Nelson; Earl Ball

Stoney Edwards singles chronology
"All She Made of Me" (1972)	"She's My Rock" (1972)	"You're a Believer" (1973)

"He's My Rock"

Single by Brenda Lee

from the album Sincerely, Brenda Lee
- B-side: "Feel Free"
- Released: March 24, 1975
- Genre: Country
- Label: MCA

Brenda Lee singles chronology
"Rock on Baby" (1974)	"He's My Rock" (1975)	"Bringing It Back" (1975)

"She's My Rock"

Single by George Jones

from the album Ladies' Choice
- B-side: "(What Love Can Do) The Second Time Around"
- Released: August 1984
- Genre: Country
- Length: 2:27
- Label: Epic
- Producer: Billy Sherrill

George Jones singles chronology
"You've Still Got a Place in My Heart" (1984)	"She's My Rock" (1984)	"Hallelujah, I Love You So" (1984)

"She's My Rock" is a song written by Sharon K. Dobbins. It was first recorded by Stoney Edwards and released as a single in 1972. Edwards' version peaked at No. 20 on the Billboard Hot Country Singles chart.

The song is sometimes recorded by female artists. In these cases, the song becomes "He's My Rock", with the genders changed as appropriate. Regardless of the song's title—either "He's My Rock" or "She's My Rock"—the song retains the same subject matter: A person who is aware of the seedy past of their now-spouse and—when confronted with the facts—strongly defending their and warning the antagonist to back off because of their own unflattering character.

== Cover versions ==
- Brenda Lee covered the song as "He's My Rock" for her 1975 album, Sincerely, Brenda Lee. Lee's rendition peaked at No. 8 on the Billboard Hot Country Singles chart.
- Olivia Newton-John also covered the song as "He's My Rock" on her 1975 album Clearly Love. Though her version was not a single on its own, it did become the B-side of her #13 Billboard Hot 100 and #1 Adult Contemporary hit of that year, "Something Better to Do."
- George Jones released a cover of the song in August 1984 as the first single from his album Ladies' Choice. Jones' version reached No. 2 on the Billboard Hot Country Singles chart in December 1984 and No. 1 on the RPM Country Tracks chart in Canada in January 1985.

== Chart performance ==
=== Stoney Edwards ===
Chart (1972–1973)	Peak position
US Hot Country Songs (Billboard)	20
Canadian RPM Country Tracks	43

=== Brenda Lee ===
Chart (1975)	Peak position
US Hot Country Songs (Billboard)	8
Canadian RPM Country Tracks	10

=== George Jones ===
Chart (1984–1985)	Peak position
US Hot Country Songs (Billboard)	2
Canadian RPM Country Tracks	1
