= The Right Left Hand =

Single by George Jones

from the album Wine Colored Roses
- B-side: "The Very Best of Me"
- Released: January 1987
- Genre: Country
- Label: Epic
- Songwriters: Dennis Knutson; A.L. "Doodle" Owens
- Producer: Billy Sherrill

George Jones singles chronology
"Wine Colored Roses" (1986)	"The Right Left Hand" (1987)	"I Turn to You" (1987)

"The Right Left Hand" is a song written by Dennis Knutson and A.L. "Doodle" Owens, and recorded by American country music artist George Jones. It was released in January 1987 as the second single from his album Wine Colored Roses. The song peaked at number 8 on the Billboard Hot Country Singles chart.

== Content ==
The song is about marriage; the narrator rejoices at putting "a golden band on the right left hand" after several failed marriages. Many interpreted the song as George's tribute to his fourth wife Nancy, whom he credited with saving his life and career. Jones would not see the Top 10 again until late 1988.

== Chart performance ==
Chart (1987)	Peak position
US Hot Country Songs (Billboard)	8
Canadian RPM Country Tracks	6
