= Who's Gonna Fill Their Shoes (song) =

Single by George Jones

from the album Who's Gonna Fill Their Shoes
- B-side: "A Whole Lot of Trouble for You"
- Released: June 8, 1985
- Genre: Country
- Length: 3:16
- Label: Epic 05439
- Songwriter(s): Max D. Barnes; Troy Seals
- Producer(s): Billy Sherrill

George Jones singles chronology
"Size Seven Round (Made of Gold)" (1985)	"Who's Gonna Fill Their Shoes" (1985)	"The One I Loved Back Then (The Corvette Song)" (1986)

"Who's Gonna Fill Their Shoes" is a song written by Troy Seals and Max D. Barnes and recorded by American country music singer George Jones. It was released in June 1985 as the first single and title track from the album Who's Gonna Fill Their Shoes. The song peaked at number three on the Hot Country Singles chart.

== Background ==
Jones sings of the irreplacibility of country music legends including Waylon Jennings, Willie Nelson, Johnny Cash, Merle Haggard, Conway Twitty, Roy Acuff, Elvis Presley, Jerry Lee Lewis, Carl Perkins, Charlie Rich, Hank Williams, Marty Robbins, and Lefty Frizzell. After remarking about these singers' impacts on music, he wonders who will replace them when they're gone - hence, the title line - and thus become legends in their own right. In the 1994 video retrospective Golden Hits Jones recalled:

"Troy Seals wrote that...He saved the day for us...Songwriters were bringin' things in and we were listening to songs and tapes, and Troy came in and told Billy [Sherrill, Jones' producer] and me that he had this idea, and he sung a little bit of the chorus...He came back about ten o'clock or eleven the next morning before we went in to do our session at two o'clock, he had it all finished and it just knocked us out."

A promotional video for the song was aired on The Nashville Network (TNN), Country Music Television (CMT) and Great American Country (GAC). Directed by Marc Ball, it also features Billy Sherrill in a cameo as the bus driver and CBS executive Rick Blackburn driving the Cadillac at the end of the video. It takes place at a roadside gas station, where the owner shares with Jones his extensive collection of albums and memorabilia from classic country music artists. At the end of the video, as Jones' tour bus pulls away, a convertible pulls into the station; its passenger is a young man with a guitar, looking in awe at the large tour bus. The video - the singer's first - won Music Video of the Year at the 1986 CMA Awards, beating out videos by the Judds, Reba McEntire, and Dwight Yoakam. However, with a new crop of country stars emerging, the song had an unfortunate connotation, with Andrew Mueller noting in Jones' Uncut obituary, "As it turned out, the song wasn't brilliantly timed. A few of its protagonists still had decades left in them, as did Jones himself..."

== Critical reception ==
Eugene Chadbourne of Allmusic describes the song as "the kind of mystical, self-serving necrophilia that country music is all about". Jones biographer Bob Allen states, "It struck a strong enough chord of empathy with old-time country music lovers to end up number three in Billboard."

== Chart performance ==
Chart (1985)	Peak position
US Hot Country Songs (Billboard)	3
Canadian RPM Country Tracks	2
