= Wine Colored Roses (song) =

Single by George Jones

from the album Wine Colored Roses
- B-side: "These Old Eyes Have Seen It All"
- Released: September 1986
- Genre: Country
- Label: Epic
- Songwriter(s): Dennis Knutson; A.L. "Doodle" Owens
- Producer(s): Billy Sherrill

George Jones singles chronology
"Somebody Wants Me Out of the Way" (1986)	"Wine Colored Roses" (1986)	"The Right Left Hand" (1987)

"Wine Colored Roses" is a song written by Dennis Knutson and A.L. "Doodle" Owens, recorded by American country music artist George Jones. It was released in September 1986 as the first single and title track from Jones' album Wine Colored Roses. The song peaked at number 10 on the Billboard Hot Country Singles chart. The song tells the story of a man who receives a letter from a caring ex-lover who asks him if he still drinks. Unable to overcome his own shame to speak with her on the telephone, he sends her a dozen wine colored roses as a symbol that he still drinks. The song became part of Jones' live show at the time, and when he would sing the line, "She asked if I had quit drinkin'," audiences would often cheer, mindful of how George had gotten sober himself in 1984. In his essay for the liner notes to the 1994 Sony compilation The Essential George Jones: The Spirit of Country, Rich Kienzle states, "If there were any doubters, 'Wine Colored Roses' proved Jones was a timeless superstar, even without stimulants."

== Chart performance ==
Chart (1986)	Peak position
US Hot Country Songs (Billboard)	10
Canadian RPM Country Tracks	13
