= I'm a One-Woman Man =

"I'm a One Woman Man"

Single by George Jones

from the album One Woman Man
- B-side: "Pretty Little Lady from Beaumont Texas"
- Released: November 1988
- Genre: Country
- Length: 2:17
- Label: Epic
- Songwriter(s): Tillman Franks, Johnny Horton
- Producer(s): Billy Sherrill

George Jones singles chronology
"If I Could Bottle This Up" (1988)	"I'm a One Woman Man" (1988)	"The King Is Gone (So Are You)" (1989)

"(I'm a) One-Woman Man" is a song co-written by American country music artist Johnny Horton and Tillman Franks. It was originally released as a single by Horton in 1956, whose version peaked at number 7 on the Billboard Hot Country Singles chart. The song was twice recorded by American country music artist George Jones: first released on the album The Crown Prince of Country Music retitled "One Woman Man" in 1960, and later as "I'm a One Woman Man" released in November 1988 as the first single from his album One Woman Man. It peaked at number 5 on the Billboard Hot Country Singles chart in early 1989 and it would be his final Top 10 solo hit.

== Chart performance ==
=== Johnny Horton ===
Chart (1956)	Peak position
U.S. Billboard Hot Country Singles	7

=== George Jones ===
Chart (1988–1989)	Peak position
US Hot Country Songs (Billboard)	5

==== Year-end charts ====
Chart (1989)	Position
Canada Country Tracks (RPM)	93
US Country Songs (Billboard)	70

== Other versions ==
- Steve Young covered the song on his pioneering Country rock/Outlaw country album Rock Salt & Nails in 1969.
- Glen Campbell covered the song on his 1987 album Still Within the Sound of My Voice.
- Hindu Love Gods covered the song on their 1990 album Hindu Love Gods.
- Josh Turner covered the song on his 2007 album Everything Is Fine under the title "One Woman Man."
