= I Always Get Lucky with You =

Single by George Jones

from the album Shine On
- B-side: "I'd Rather Have What We Had"
- Released: April 1983
- Genre: Country
- Length: 3:18
- Label: Epic
- Songwriters: Merle Haggard; Freddy Powers; Gary Church; Tex Whitson
- Producer: Billy Sherrill

George Jones singles chronology
"Shine On (Shine All Your Sweet Love on Me)" (1983)	"I Always Get Lucky with You" (1983)	"Tennessee Whiskey" (1983)

"I Always Get Lucky With You" is a song written by Merle Haggard, Freddy Powers, Gary Church, and Tex Whitson. It was first recorded by Haggard on his 1981 album Big City and then covered by American country music artist George Jones in April 1983 as the second single from the album Shine On. The song was Jones' ninth and final number one on the country chart as a solo artist (and thirteenth overall). The single stayed at number one for one week and spent thirteen weeks on the country chart.

== Background ==
Co-writer Merle Haggard recorded the song first on his 1981 hit LP Big City but did not release it as a single. According to the Stephen L. Betts Rolling Stone article "George Jones Gets 'Lucky' with Merle Haggard Song" published online on February 13, 2015, Haggard's manager, Tex Whitson, first pitched it to Jones' producer Billy Sherrill because Jones and Haggard were on the outs at the time. "I'd get mad at him over the years because of his self-damage, but everything I said to him was out of love," Haggard wrote in an article for Rolling Stone after his friend died. "Imagine you're George Jones, and every night you're expected to sing as good as you did on a song like 'She Thinks I Still Care.' He was a shy country boy from East Texas walking around with that on his shoulders. He knew people expected him to be the greatest country singer that ever lived. He was the Babe Ruth of country music, and people expected a home run every time."

Sherrill, who had produced Jones and Haggard on their first duet album together A Taste of Yesterday's Wine the year before, persuaded Jones to cut it. In the 1994 video retrospective Golden Hits, Jones recalled that he "sung it around Nashville at some of the clubs to try and get used to it before I went into the studio and it came off great. It's a great song. Merle Haggard wrote a good one there." Jones, who was about to hit rock bottom after spending most of the previous decade in a booze and drug-crazed wasteland, delivered a sterling performance, which became the last chart topper of his career, ironically bumping off "Pancho and Lefty," Haggard's hit duet with Willie Nelson. Haggard would record the song again in 2006 as part of the second Jones/Haggard release Kickin' Out the Footlights...Again. A duet version featuring Jones and Shelby Lynne was made available on the 2009 Jones LP Burn Your Playhouse Down.

== Charts ==
=== Weekly charts ===
Chart (1983)	Peak position
US Hot Country Songs (Billboard)	1
Canadian RPM Country Tracks	6

=== Year-end charts ===
Chart (1983)	Position
US Hot Country Songs (Billboard)	11
