= Troy Seals =

American singer-songwriter (1938–2025)

Troy Harold Seals (November 16, 1938 – March 6, 2025) was an American singer, songwriter, and guitarist.

== Life and career ==
Seals was born on November 16, 1938. He was a member of the prominent Seals family of pop musicians that includes Jim Seals (of Seals and Crofts), Dan Seals (of England Dan & John Ford Coley), Brady Seals (Little Texas and Hot Apple Pie), and Johnny Duncan. During the 1970s, Seals recorded with Lonnie Mack and Doug Kershaw and although he made two albums of his own, he is best known as a songwriter. His songs have been recorded by artists such as Joe Cocker, Eric Clapton, Nancy Sinatra, Randy Travis, Conway Twitty, Hank Williams Jr., Elvis Presley, Roy Orbison, Charlie Rich, Levon Helm, and Jerry Lee Lewis. George Jones' "Who's Gonna Fill Their Shoes," was co-written with Max D. Barnes.

Seals played guitar on numerous sessions for recording stars and collaborated on songs with Waylon Jennings, Vince Gill, Will Jennings and others. He had three co-written songs nominated for the Country Music Association "Song of the Year" award: "Seven Spanish Angels" (1985), "Lost in the Fifties Tonight" (1986), and "If You Ever Have Forever In Mind" (1999). He also co-wrote "L.A. Lady" for the New Riders of the Purple Sage, along with Will Jennings and Donald Clint Goodman. "L.A. Lady" was also recorded by Dobie Gray.

In recognition of his successful career, Seals was inducted into the Nashville Songwriters Hall of Fame.

Seals died on March 6, 2025, at the age of 86.

== Singles ==
Year	Single	Peak chart positions
Year	Single	US Country
1973	"I Got a Thing About You Baby"	93
1974	"Star of the Bar"	78
1974	"You Can't Judge a Book by the Cover"^{A}	96
1974	"Honky Tonkin'"	81
1975	"Easy"	76
1976	"Sweet Dreams"	88
1977	"Grand Ole Blues"	93
1980	"One Night Honeymoon"	85

- ^{A}B-side to "Star of the Bar."
