= He Stopped Loving Her Today =

1980 single by George Jones

Single by George Jones

from the album I Am What I Am
- B-side: "A Hard Act to Follow"
- Released: April 14, 1980
- Recorded: 1979
- Studio: Columbia Studio B (Nashville, Tennessee)
- Genre: Country
- Length: 3:15
- Label: Epic
- Songwriters: Bobby Braddock, Curly Putman
- Producer: Billy Sherrill

George Jones singles chronology
"Someday My Day Will Come" (1979)	"He Stopped Loving Her Today" (1980)	"I'm Not Ready Yet" (1980)

"He Stopped Loving Her Today" is a song recorded by American country music artist George Jones. It has been named in several surveys as the greatest country song of all time. It was released in April 1980 as the lead single from the album I Am What I Am. The song was Jones's first solo No. 1 single in six years. It was written by Bobby Braddock and Curly Putman. The week after Jones' death in 2013, the song re-entered the Hot Country Songs chart at No. 21. As of November 13, 2013, the single has sold 521,000 copies in the United States. Since 2008 it has been preserved by the Library of Congress in the National Recording Registry. The song was ranked no. 142 on Rolling Stone's 2021 500 Greatest Songs of All Time ranking.

Alan Jackson sang the song during George Jones' funeral service on May 2, 2013. George Strait and Jackson sang the song as a tribute during the 2013 CMA Awards on November 6, 2013. Garth Brooks sang it at the 19 March 2025 Opry 100: A Live Celebration TV special, lauding George Jones as both the greatest country music singer of all time as well as this being, in his opinion, the greatest country song of all time.

== Content ==
The song was written by Bobby Braddock and Curly Putman and tells the story of a man whose lover leaves him. Vowing to love her until he dies, he keeps old letters and photos from their previous romance and hangs on to hope that she would "come back again". Eventually a day comes when the man, in heavily veiled but graphic language, dies—"all dressed up to go away, first time I'd seen him smile in years" (i.e., in his funeral suit with a rictus grin, as molded on corpses) while "they placed a wreath upon his door and soon they'll carry him away" (indicating the wreath that used to be hung on the doors of houses where someone had died, and "they" being the pallbearers). His former lover attends the funeral to pay her respects, something his friends were unsure would happen; they conclude that this is indeed when he, now dead, is no longer in love with her, hence the title of the song.

== Recording ==
By 1980, Jones had not had a number one single in six years and, due to this and his major downward spiral into drug use following his divorce from Tammy Wynette, many critics began to write him off. Producer Billy Sherrill introduced Jones to the song in 1978 but, according to Sherrill and Jones himself, the singer hated the song when he first heard it. In Bob Allen's biography of the singer, Sherrill states, "He thought it was too long, too sad, too depressing and that nobody would ever play it. He hated the melody and wouldn't learn it." Sherrill also claims that Jones frustrated him by continually singing the song to the melody of the Kris Kristofferson hit "Help Me Make It Through the Night". In the Same Ole Me retrospective, Sherrill recalls a heated exchange during one recording session: "I said 'That's not the melody!' and he said 'Yeah, but it's a better melody.' I said 'It might be—Kristofferson would think so too, it's his melody!'" In the same documentary, Sherrill claims that Jones was in such bad physical shape during this period that "the recitation was recorded 18 months after the first verse was" and added that the last words Jones said about "He Stopped Loving Her Today" was "Nobody'll buy that morbid son of a bitch".

During the song's recording, the first take did not turn out well. Prior to the second take, Wynette and her husband George Richey appeared in the recording studio though Jones could see them with Sherrill through the tinted screen. Jones' second take would be the one that would be released following Sherrill's remastering of the song. This was seen in the last part of the Showtime miniseries George and Tammy in January 2023.

To the astonishment of Jones and most others involved, "He Stopped Loving Her Today" shot to number one on the country charts in July 1980. Although he had disliked "He Stopped Loving Her Today" when it was first offered to him, Jones ultimately gave the song credit for reviving his flagging career, stating that "a four-decade career had been salvaged by a three-minute song." It was as much a tour de force for the producer as for the singer, featuring all the hallmarks of Sherrill's symphonic approach to country production, featuring cresting strings and dramatic flourishes. Had it not been for Sherrill, it is unlikely the song would have ever been recorded, such was his belief in the song, although he did share some of Jones' misgivings initially; in his 1996 memoir, Jones recalled,

Putman and Braddock killed the song's main character too soon in their early versions. Billy kept telling them to kill the guy at a different time and then have the woman come to his funeral. He gave the song to me, and I carried it for more than a year, also convinced that it needed rewriting. Billy had a notebook about an inch thick that was nothing but rewrites for "He Stopped Loving Her Today."

== Critical reception ==
The success of "He Stopped Loving Her Today" led CBS Records to renew Jones' recording contract and sparked new interest in the singer. Jones earned the Grammy Award for Best Male Country Vocal Performance in 1980. The Academy of Country Music awarded the song Single of the Year and Song of the Year in 1980. It also became the Country Music Association's Song of the Year in both 1980 and 1981. The song was ranked number 142 by Rolling Stone in its 2021 edition of the 500 Greatest Songs of All Time and number 4 on its list of the 100 greatest country songs of all time. In 2007, the 1980 release of the song on Epic Records by George Jones was inducted into the Grammy Hall of Fame.

The song became so synonymous with Jones that few singers dared to cover it. Jones recorded the song again with producer Keith Stegall for the 2005 album Hits I Missed...And One I Didn't. A recording of Johnny Cash performing the song is featured on the 2003 collection Unearthed and Trent Summar & the New Row Mob recorded it on 2006's Horseshoes & Hand Grenades.

Jones' friend Alan Jackson performed the song during Jones' funeral service at the Grand Ole Opry.

In June 2026, CBS News included the song in its list of the 250 essential American songs of the past 250 years.

== Personnel ==
Credits.

- George Jones – lead vocals
- The Jordanaires – backing vocals
- Millie Kirkham – backing vocals
- Hargus "Pig" Robbins – piano
- Pete Drake – pedal steel guitar
- Charlie McCoy – harmonica
- Jimmy Capps – lead guitar
- Jerry Carrigan – drums
- unknown – acoustic and electric guitars, bass, strings

Production staff

- Billy Sherrill – producer
- Lou Bradley – engineer
- Ron “Snake” Reynolds – engineer

== Chart performance ==
Chart (1980)	Peak position
US Hot Country Songs (Billboard)	1
Canadian RPM Country Tracks	2
Chart (2013)	Peak position
US Hot Country Songs (Billboard)	21

=== Year-end charts ===
Chart (1980)	Position
US Country Songs (Billboard)	3

== Bibliography ==
- Allen, Bob (1996). George Jones: The Life and Times of a Honky Tonk Legend. St Martin's Press. ISBN 978-0312956981.
- Jones, George; Carter, Tom (1996). I Lived to Tell it All. Villard. ISBN 978-0679438694.
