= A. L. "Doodle" Owens =

American singer-songwriter (1930–1999)

Arthur Leo "Doodle" Owens (November 28, 1930 – October 4, 1999) was an American country music songwriter and singer. He had a long songwriting partnership with Dallas Frazier, with whom he wrote "All I Have to Offer You (Is Me)" (1969), "(I'm So) Afraid of Losing You Again" (1969), "I Can't Believe That You've Stopped Loving Me" (1970) and "Then Who Am I" (1974), all number-one country hits for Charley Pride. In the 1980s, Owens wrote many songs with fellow songwriter Dennis Knutson for George Jones and other artists.

Owens was born in Waco, Texas. As a singer, his only charting hit was "Honky Tonk Toys", written by Owens with Gene Vowell, which made it to number 78 on the country charts in 1978.

Charley Pride's version of "All I Have to Offer You (Is Me)" was nominated for a Grammy Award for Best Country Song in 1970. Owens was inducted into the Nashville Songwriters Hall of Fame in 1999.

Owens died in Nashville, Tennessee, at the age of 68.

== Other charting songs by Owens ==
- "Get This Stranger Out of Me" (Owens) – number 63 country, Lefty Frizzell, 1967
- "Barbara" (Owens) – number 55 country, George Morgan, 1968 (title song of album)
- "Johnny One Time" (Owens, Frazier) – number 36 country, Willie Nelson, 1968; number three Adult Contemporary, Brenda Lee, 1969
- "Raggedy Ann" (Owens, Frazier) – number 45 country, Charlie Rich, 1968
- "True Love Travels on a Gravel Road" (Owens, Frazier) – number 58 country, Duane Dee, 1968
- "What Are Those Things (With Big Black Wings)" (Owens, Frazier) – number 19 country, Charlie Louvin, 1969
- "Chain Don't Take to Me" (Owens, Frazier) – number 30 country, Bob Luman, 1971
- "She's as Close as I Can Get to Loving You" (Owens, Frazier) – number 61 country, Hank Locklin, 1971
- "She Wakes Me with a Kiss Every Morning (And She Loves Me to Sleep Every Night)" (Owens, Frazier) – number 11 country, Nat Stuckey, 1971
- "Touching Home" (Owens, Frazier) – number three country, Jerry Lee Lewis, 1971 (title song of album)
- "When He Walks on You (Like You Have Walked on Me)" (Owens, Frazier) – number 11 country, Jerry Lee Lewis, 1971
- "Just for What I Am" (Owens, Frazier) – number five country, Connie Smith, 1972
- "Hank and Lefty Raised My Country Soul" (Owens, Frazier) – number 39 country, Stoney Edwards, 1973
- "Some Old California Memory" (Owens, Warren Robb) – number 28 country, Henson Cargill, 1973
- "Would You Walk With Me, Jimmy?" (Owens, Whitey Shafer) – number 22 country, Arlene Harden, 1973
- "Champagne Ladies and Blue Ribbon Babies" (Owens, Frazier) – number 34 country, Ferlin Husky, 1974 (title song of album)
- "I Just Started Hatin' Cheatin' Songs Today" (Owens, Shafer) – number 17 country, Moe Bandy, 1974
- "Freckles and Polliwog Days" (Owens, Frazier) – number 26 country, Ferlin Husky, 1974
- "There's Still a Lot of Love in San Antone" (Owens, Lou Rochelle) – number 48 country, Darrell McCall, 1974; number 64 country, Connie Hanson and Friend, 1982
- "Falling" (Owens, Shafer) – number 50 country, Lefty Frizzell, 1975
- "It Was Always So Easy (To Find An Unhappy Woman)" (Owens, Shafer) – number seven country, Moe Bandy, 1975
- "Because You Believed in Me" (Owens, Shorty Hall, Gene Vowell) – number 20 country, Gene Watson, 1976
- "Cowboys Ain't Supposed to Cry" (Owens) – number 13 country, Moe Bandy, 1977
- "She Just Loved the Cheatin' Out of Me" (Owens, Shafer) – number 11 country, Moe Bandy, 1977
- "You Still Get to Me in My Dreams" (Owens, Bill Shore) – number 16 country, Tammy Wynette, 1982
- "Cold Summer Day in Georgia" (Owens, Dennis Knutson) – number 24 country, Gene Watson, 1985
- "Somebody Wants Me Out of the Way" (Owens, Knutson) – number nine country, George Jones, 1986
- "Wine Colored Roses" (Owens, Knutson) – number 10 country, George Jones, 1986
- "The Bird" (Owens, Knutson) – number 26 country, George Jones, 1987
- "The Right Left Hand" (Owens, Knutson) – number eight country, George Jones, 1987
- "Fourteen Minutes Old" (Owens, Knutson) – number six country, Doug Stone, 1990

(Darrell McCall was the "Friend" in the 1982 release of "There's Still a Lot of Love in San Antone". The single was released at the end of 1982, but reached number 64 on the country charts in February 1983.)
