= Billy Yates =

Billy Yates may refer to:

- Billy Yates (American football) (born 1980), American National Football League coach and former offensive lineman
- Billy Yates (singer) (born 1963), American country singer
  - Billy Yates (album), his self-titled debut album

== See also ==
- William Yates
