= William Yates =

William Yates may refer to:

- William Yates (died 1558 or 1559) (1505–1558/1559), Member of Parliament for Lincoln
- William Yates (college president) (1720–1764), College of William & Mary's fifth president (1761–1764)
- William Yates (cartographer) (1738–1802), British cartographer
- William Yates (missionary) (1792–1845), Baptist missionary to India
- William Yates (athlete) (1880–1967), British Olympic racewalker
- William Yates (footballer) (1883–?), English footballer
- William Yates (politician) (1921–2010), British and Australian politician
- William H. Yates (died 1868), American abolitionist and writer
- Bill Yates (1921–2001), American cartoonist
- Billy Yates (American football) (born 1980), American National Football League coach and former offensive lineman
- Chip Yates (William Morrison Yates III, born 1971), American inventor and electrical vehicle pioneer

== See also ==
- Bill Yates (footballer) (1903–1978), English footballer and cricketer
- Billy Yates (singer) (born 1963), American country singer
  - Billy Yates (album), his self-titled debut album
- William Butler Yeats (pronounced Yates, 1865–1939), poet and dramatist
- Billy Yeats (pronounced Yates, 1951–2013), English footballer
