= Old Ideas World Tour =

2012–13 concert tour by Leonard Cohen

- Tour by Leonard Cohen
- Associated album: Old Ideas
- Start date: August 12, 2012
- End date: December 21, 2013
- Legs: 5
- No. of shows: 63 in Europe; 46 in North America; 16 in Oceania; 125 in total

Leonard Cohen concert chronology
- Leonard Cohen Tour 2008–2010 (2008–10); Old Ideas World Tour (2012–13)

The Old Ideas World Tour was the final concert tour by Canadian poet and singer-songwriter Leonard Cohen, and was in support of his 2012 album Old Ideas. The tour started in August 2012, and ended in December 2013.

== Background ==
On March 26, 2012 Cohen announced the first eighteen concerts taking place in Belgium, Denmark, Norway, Sweden, Finland, Germany, Ireland, Italy, France, Spain and Portugal forming part of the first European leg of the 'Old Ideas World Tour'. On April 2 two further concerts were added in Ghent due to high public demand and on April 4 it was announced that Cohen would perform a third concert for the same reason. It was revealed by the Telegraph newspaper that Cohen would perform his only UK show at the Hop Farm Country Farm in Kent in September. On May 17 a second concert at the Hop Farm Country Farm was announced for September 9. However, on August 23 both concerts would be moved to Wembley Arena in London, England, for unspecified reasons.

=== First European leg ===
The first leg of the tour consisted of 31 shows, played all over Europe. The structure of each show was similar to the previous tour. The main set was split into two blocks with a short intermission in between. Many songs from the latest record were performed, most of them for the first time ever. "Darkness" (known as The Darkness on the previous tour) was the only song on the record that had been performed before this leg. "Amen", "Come Healing" and the aforementioned "Darkness" would become tour staples, played in every show on this leg. Other new songs that were performed more or less regular are "Going Home", "Different Sides", "Crazy to Love You", "Banjo" and "Anyhow". "Lullaby" and "Show Me the Place" remained the only two songs from the album not played on this leg.

Apart from the new songs, some older songs made their way into the set, most notably the song Alexandra Leaving. It was performed in every show entirely by Sharon Robinson after a short introduction by Cohen. The song was preceded by the song Coming Back to You from the album Various Positions. It was performed in an acoustic version by the Webb Sisters, with Charlie and Hattie Webb taking over the vocals and instrumentation (harp and guitar). Both songs were not played on the previous tour. Other songs that were not performed on the previous tour were "I Can't Forget", "The Guests", and "Light As the Breeze" (performed for the first time ever). "Night Comes On" was played regularly on this leg of the tour after having only two outings on the previous tour.

The concerts themselves were longer than the concerts at the beginning of the last tour. Opening night in Ghent for example featured 33 songs, with four encore blocks containing 9 songs. The concerts of this leg would often end close to or at curfew of the respective venues, with the last song often being "Save the Last Dance for Me", a song made famous by The Drifters. Overall, 40 different songs were performed on this leg.

=== First North American leg ===
The North American leg of the tour was announced via Cohen's official website on 3 May 2012. The first concerts to be announced were 11 in the United States and 10 in Canada. Cohen later announced second concerts in Montreal and Toronto due to increasing public demand. Soon after a second concerts were announced for Austin, Texas and Boston, Massachusetts.

The concerts themselves followed the same structure as the first leg of the tours. Songs not performed in North America that were played in Europe were "Crazy to Love You" and "Light As the Breeze". Instead, a selection of other songs made their debut, including "Show Me the Place", leaving "Lullaby" as the only song from "Old Ideas" not played on this tour. "Going Home" became a concert staple, being played every night of this leg. Other songs that were played for the first time on this leg of the tour include "The Guests", "Joan of Arc" (both not played on the previous tour) as well as "Lover Lover Lover", "Chelsea Hotel #2" and the as-of-now unreleased "Feels So Good". This leg also featured a rare cover of George Dor's "La Manic", played in the Franco-Canadian part of the tour. Altogether, 46 different songs were performed at the 25 concerts of this leg.

=== Second North American leg ===
In January 2013, new dates for concerts in Canada and the United States were announced. The concerts were held in March and April, before the European Summer leg.

The tour commenced after a two-month break, for another 21 shows in North America. Tour premieres in this leg of the tour included the song "Avalanche", while "Coming Back to You" was dropped from the setlists, after having received only little attention on the previous leg, in favor of "If It Be Your Will", a concert staple on the last tour. The Old Ideas songs "Anyhow" and "Show Me the Place" were featured in most shows on this leg, while "Different Sides" was only played twice. "Choices", made famous by George Jones was played in honor of his recent passing, making it the third cover version being played on this tour. 39 different songs were played on this leg of the tour.

=== Second European leg ===
In December 2012 the first dates for 2013 were announced with concerts to take place in Europe. Altogether, 32 shows have been announced. On his second run through Europe, Cohen revisited some of the larger cities, e.g. Amsterdam, Berlin, Dublin, London and Paris, but also included some new stops, including performances in Croatia, Czech Republic, Slovenia and Poland as well as Switzerland and Austria. Only two shows were open air, most of the performances were indoors at larger arenas.

The shows themselves followed the structure of previous legs on this tour very closely, although noticeably shorter in length and with less songs performed. So featured the first concert in Berlin in 2012 29 songs and had to be cut short due to curfew constraints, whereas the second concert in 2013 featured only 26 songs, with a full length encore block. "Different Sides" and "Show Me the Place" went unplayed during this leg, which meant that the latter one has not been performed on Europe to this date. All three cover songs were played, with "Save the Last Dance for Me" being performed 16 times. "Avalanche", "Night Comes On" and "Hey, That's No Way to Say Goodbye" were rarities that received only little attention. The song "Anyhow" was performed at a few venues in the United Kingdom. A noticeable change in the setlist occurred during the early part of the leg when "Anthem" was dropped from the show. It had been a staple during the last tour and this tour until that point, having been performed at all shows, usually closing the first set. It was played only 6 times during the last 23 shows of this leg. Its place was taken over by the song "Lover Lover Lover". Similar to the last tour, Cohen presented a new song to his audience. "I've Got a Secret" had its debut at the second Dublin show, and has been performed twice more after that. It is described as an evolution of the song "Feels So Good", sharing some lines with the song.

On this leg of the tour, 43 different songs have been performed.

=== Australia/New Zealand leg ===
On 29 July 2013 it was announced on Cohen's official page that the tour would continue in November and December with concerts in New Zealand and Australia. Additional concerts for Wellington, Sydney and Melbourne were announced a few weeks after. However, the Australian concerts of those concerts were rescheduled to smaller venues, indicating much slower ticket sales than anticipated.

The last leg of the tour consisted of 16 concerts in both countries, including two open air shows for the "A Day On The Green" concert series. The setlist included "Anthem" again as the closing song of the first set at all concerts. Overall there was very little variation, with only 30 different songs being played (a standard setlist included between 25 and 28 songs). "In My Secret Life" was played on two occasions towards the beginning of the leg, as was the song "Waiting for the Miracle". The latter one re-appeared at the Wellington and Auckland concerts, though in a much different and 'darker' version as compared to the previous version that was played during this and last tour. The song "I've Got a Secret" was also played on a few occasions during the encores. The final concert of the tour was played on 21 December 2013 in Auckland, New Zealand. It was the last concert of Leonard Cohen.

== Tour dates ==
Date	City	Country	Venue	Tickets sold / available	Gross revenue
Europe
August 12, 2012	Ghent	Belgium	St. Peter's Square	39,425 / 39,425 (100%)	$2,225,594
August 14, 2012	Ghent	Belgium	St. Peter's Square	39,425 / 39,425 (100%)	$2,225,594
August 15, 2012	Ghent	Belgium	St. Peter's Square	39,425 / 39,425 (100%)	$2,225,594
August 17, 2012	Ghent	Belgium	St. Peter's Square	39,425 / 39,425 (100%)	$2,225,594
August 18, 2012	Ghent	Belgium	St. Peter's Square	39,425 / 39,425 (100%)	$2,225,594
August 21, 2012	Amsterdam	Netherlands	Amsterdam Olympic Stadium	23,141 / 23,141 (100%)	$1,393,754
August 22, 2012	Amsterdam	Netherlands	Amsterdam Olympic Stadium	23,141 / 23,141 (100%)	$1,393,754
August 25, 2012	Copenhagen	Denmark	Rosenborg Castle	13,608 / 13,608 (100%)	$1,700,334
August 26, 2012	Aalborg	Denmark	Mølleparken	8,590 / 8,590 (100%)	$902,008
August 28, 2012	Bergen	Norway	Koengen	10,690 / 10,690 (100%)	$1,323,462
August 29, 2012	Halden	Norway	Fredriksten	8,753 / 8,753 (100%)	$1,127,975
August 31, 2012	Gothenburg	Sweden	Gamla Ullevi	5,023 / 5,023 (100%)	$683,539
September 2, 2012	Helsinki	Finland	Sonera Stadium	11,594 / 11,594 (100%)	$1,362,923
September 5, 2012	Berlin	Germany	Waldbühne	16,659 / 16,659 (100%)	$999,838
September 6, 2012	Mönchengladbach	Germany	Warsteiner HockeyPark	6,746 / 6,746 (100%)	$523,841
September 8, 2012	London	England	Wembley Arena	22,741 / 22,741 (100%)	$2,008,689
September 9, 2012	London	England	Wembley Arena	22,741 / 22,741 (100%)	$2,008,689
September 11, 2012	Dublin	Ireland	Irish Museum of Modern Art	38,353 / 38,353 (100%)	$4,518,695
September 12, 2012	Dublin	Ireland	Irish Museum of Modern Art	38,353 / 38,353 (100%)	$4,518,695
September 14, 2012	Dublin	Ireland	Irish Museum of Modern Art	38,353 / 38,353 (100%)	$4,518,695
September 15, 2012	Dublin	Ireland	Irish Museum of Modern Art	38,353 / 38,353 (100%)	$4,518,695
September 19, 2012	Istanbul	Turkey	Ülker Sports Arena	7,694 / 7,694 (100%)	$756,749
September 22, 2012	Bucharest	Romania	Piata Constitutiei	10,202 / 10,202 (100%)	$2,649,970
September 24, 2012	Verona	Italy	Verona Arena	8,507 / 8,507 (100%)	$680,305
September 26, 2012	Toulon	France	Zénith Oméga de Toulon	1,665 / 1,665 (100%)	$300,077
September 28, 2012	Paris	France	L'Olympia	5,796 / 5,796 (100%)	$1,043,317
September 29, 2012	Paris	France	L'Olympia	5,796 / 5,796 (100%)	$1,043,317
September 30, 2012	Paris	France	L'Olympia	5,796 / 5,796 (100%)	$1,043,317
October 3, 2012	Barcelona	Spain	Palau Sant Jordi	9,665 / 9,665 (100%)	$829,789
October 5, 2012	Madrid	Spain	Palacio de Deportes de la Comunidad	10,461 / 10,461 (100%)	$914,212
October 7, 2012	Lisbon	Portugal	Pavilhão Atlântico	8,445 / 8,445 (100%)	$605,181
North America
October 31, 2012	Austin	United States	Bass Concert Hall	5,561 / 5,561 (100%)	$645,292
November 1, 2012	Austin	United States	Bass Concert Hall	5,561 / 5,561 (100%)	$645,292
November 3, 2012	Broomfield	United States	1stBank Center	5,277 / 5,277 (100%)	$421,194
November 5, 2012	Los Angeles	United States	Nokia Theatre L.A. Live	6,858 / 6,858 (100%)	$809,499
November 7, 2012	San Jose	United States	HP Pavilion at San Jose	6,227 / 6,227 (100%)	$555,457
November 9, 2012	Seattle	United States	KeyArena	6,958 / 6,958 (100%)	$549,733
November 11, 2012	Portland	United States	Rose Garden Arena	4,791 / 4,965 (96%)	$433,426
November 12, 2012	Vancouver	Canada	Rogers Arena	8,628 / 8,628 (100%)	$1,069,192
November 16, 2012	Calgary	Canada	Scotiabank Saddledome	9,244 / 9,244 (100%)	$910,599
November 18, 2012	Edmonton	Canada	Rexall Place	7,918 / 7,918 (100%)	$809,483
November 20, 2012	Saskatoon	Canada	Credit Union Centre	5,479 / 5,479 (100%)	$439,519
November 23, 2012	Rosemont	United States	Akoo Theatre in Rosemont	4,312 / 4,312 (100%)	$473,567
November 26, 2012	Detroit	United States	Fox Theatre	4,651 / 4,651 (100%)	$450,828
November 28, 2012	Montreal	Canada	Bell Centre	21,016 / 21,016 (100%)	$2,035,159
November 29, 2012	Montreal	Canada	Bell Centre	21,016 / 21,016 (100%)	$2,035,159
December 2, 2012	Quebec City	Canada	Colisée Pepsi	6,537 / 6,537 (100%)	$516,102
December 4, 2012	Toronto	Canada	Air Canada Centre	19,578 / 19,578 (100%)	$1,944,092
December 5, 2012	Toronto	Canada	Air Canada Centre	19,578 / 19,578 (100%)	$1,944,092
December 7, 2012	Ottawa	Canada	Scotiabank Place	8,338 / 8,338 (100%)	$709,178
December 11, 2012	London	Canada	Budweiser Gardens	5,417 / 5,417 (100%)	$564,727
December 13, 2012	Kingston	Canada	K-Rock Centre	4,788 / 4,788 (100%)	$528,666
December 15, 2012	Boston	United States	Wang Theatre	7,154 / 7,154 (100%)	$822,185
December 16, 2012	Boston	United States	Wang Theatre	7,154 / 7,154 (100%)	$822,185
December 18, 2012	New York City	United States	Madison Square Garden	11,486 / 11,486 (100%)	$1,603,406
December 20, 2012	New York City	United States	Barclays Center	9,540 / 9,540 (100%)	$951,849
March 2, 2013	Oakland	United States	Paramount Theatre	5,792 / 5,792 (100%)	$771,868
March 3, 2013	Oakland	United States	Paramount Theatre	5,792 / 5,792 (100%)	$771,868
March 6, 2013	Victoria	Canada	Save-On-Foods Memorial Centre	5,023 / 5,023 (100%)	$545,420
March 13, 2013	Chicago	United States	Chicago Theatre	3,478 / 3,478 (100%)	$431,769
March 15, 2013	Milwaukee	United States	Milwaukee Theatre	3,617 / 3,617 (100%)	$390,277
March 18, 2013	Tampa	United States	Carol Morsani Hall	2,411 / 2,580 (93%)	$262,215
March 20, 2013	Miami	United States	James L. Knight Center	3,349 / 3,349 (100%)	$330,343
March 22, 2013	Atlanta	United States	Fox Theatre	3,420 / 4,523 (76%)	$416,287
March 24, 2013	Memphis	United States	Orpheum Theatre	2,122 / 2,122 (100%)	$207,994
March 28, 2013	New Orleans	United States	Mahalia Jackson Theater	2,153 / 2,153 (100%)	$241,227
March 30, 2013	Louisville	United States	The Louisville Palace	2,456 / 2,456 (100%)	$247,781
April 2, 2013	Wallingford	United States	Oakdale Theatre	3,094 / 3,094 (100%)	$289,719
April 6, 2013	New York City	United States	Radio City Music Hall	11,515 / 11,515 (100%)	$1,719,423
April 7, 2013	New York City	United States	Radio City Music Hall	11,515 / 11,515 (100%)	$1,719,423
April 9, 2013	Hamilton	Canada	Copps Coliseum	6,074 / 6,074 (100%)	$614,223
April 13, 2013	Halifax	Canada	Halifax Metro Centre	8,101 / 8,101 (100%)	$744,075
April 15, 2013	Saint John	Canada	Harbour Station	3,987 / 3,987 (100%)	$295,418
April 17, 2013	Moncton	Canada	Moncton Coliseum	4,351 / 4,351 (100%)	$351,754
April 20, 2013	St. John's	Canada	Mile One Centre	5,775 / 5,775 (100%)	$730,025
April 26, 2013	Winnipeg	Canada	MTS Centre	6,284 / 6,284 (100%)	$596,709
April 28, 2013	Regina	Canada	Brandt Centre	3,358 / 3,358 (100%)	$281,760
Europe
June 18, 2013	Paris	France	Palais Omnisports de Paris-Bercy	—	—
June 21, 2013	London	England	The O_{2} Arena	15,801 / 16,073 (98%)	$1,349,330
June 23, 2013	Antwerp	Belgium	Sportpaleis	—	—
June 25, 2013	Oberhausen	Germany	König Pilsener Arena	—	—
June 28, 2013	Mannheim	Germany	SAP Arena	—	—
June 30, 2013	Brussels	Belgium	Forest National	—	—
July 4, 2013^{[A]}	Montreux	Switzerland	Auditorium Stravinski	—	—
July 5, 2013^{[A]}	Montreux	Switzerland	Auditorium Stravinski	—	—
July 7, 2013^{[B]}	Rome	Italy	Foro Italico	—	—
July 9, 2013^{[C]}	Lucca	Italy	Piazza Napoleone	—	—
July 14, 2013	Hamburg	Germany	O_{2} World Hamburg	7,396 / 11,077 (67%)	$625,266
July 17, 2013	Berlin	Germany	O_{2} World Berlin	11,849 / 11,876 (~100%)	$928,524
July 19, 2013	Łódź	Poland	Atlas Arena	—	—
July 21, 2013	Prague	Czech Republic	O_{2} Arena	—	—
July 25, 2013	Ljubljana	Slovenia	Arena Stožice	—	—
July 27, 2013	Vienna	Austria	Wiener Stadthalle	—	—
August 2, 2013	Pula	Croatia	Pula Arena	—	—
August 15, 2013	Stockholm	Sweden	Ericsson Globe	—	—
August 17, 2013	Odense	Denmark	The King's Garden	—	—
August 20, 2013	Oslo	Norway	Oslo Spektrum	—	—
August 24, 2013	Zürich	Switzerland	Hallenstadion	5,026 / 10,500 (48%)	$773,407
August 26, 2013	Bournemouth	England	Bournemouth International Centre	—	—
August 28, 2013	Brighton	England	Brighton Centre	—	—
August 31, 2013	Manchester	England	Manchester Arena	7,827 / 9,880 (79%)	$708,420
September 3, 2013	Cardiff	Wales	Motorpoint Arena Cardiff	—	—
September 7, 2013	Leeds	England	First Direct Arena	—	—
September 8, 2013	Birmingham	England	LG Arena	—	—
September 11, 2013	Dublin	Ireland	The O_{2}	—	—
September 12, 2013	Dublin	Ireland	The O_{2}	—	—
September 15, 2013	London	England	The O_{2} Arena	13,139 / 13,603 (97%)	$928,524
September 18, 2013	Rotterdam	Netherlands	Rotterdam Ahoy	—	—
September 20, 2013	Amsterdam	Netherlands	Ziggo Dome	—	—
Oceania
November 13, 2013	Perth	Australia	Perth Arena	8,412 / 8,709 (97%)	$1,404,880
November 16, 2013	Sydney	Australia	Sydney Entertainment Centre	—	—
November 20, 2013	Melbourne	Australia	Rod Laver Arena	9,311 / 9,924 (94%)	$1,331,130
November 23, 2013^{[D]}	Hunter Valley	Australia	Bimbadgen Winery	—	—
November 26, 2013	Cairns	Australia	Cairns Convention Centre	—	—
November 28, 2013	Townsville	Australia	Entertainment & Convention Centre	—	—
November 30, 2013	Brisbane	Australia	Brisbane Entertainment Centre	5,542 / 5,766 (96%)	$921,003
December 2, 2013	Sydney	Australia	Sydney Opera House	—	—
December 4, 2013	Wollongong	Australia	WIN Entertainment Centre	—	—
December 7, 2013^{[D]}	Geelong	Australia	The Hill Winery	—	—
December 9, 2013	Melbourne	Australia	Palais Theatre	—	—
December 11, 2013	Adelaide	Australia	Adelaide Entertainment Centre	—	—
December 14, 2013	Christchurch	New Zealand	CBS Canterbury Arena	6,088 / 6,778 (90%)	$812,196
December 17, 2013	Wellington	New Zealand	TSB Bank Arena	—	—
December 18, 2013	Wellington	New Zealand	TSB Bank Arena	—	—
December 21, 2013	Auckland	New Zealand	Vector Arena	—	—
TOTAL				604,956 / 619,584 (97.6%)	$61,713,242

Festivals and other miscellaneous performances

^{A} This concert was a part of "Montreux Jazz Festival"
^{B} This concert was a part of "Il Centrale Live 2013"
^{C} This concert was a part of "Lucca Summer Festival"
^{D} This concert was a part of "A Day On The Green"

Cancellations and rescheduled shows

September 25, 2012	Verona	Verona Arena	Postponed to September 24, 2012.
August 31, 2012	Gothenburg	Trädgårdsföreningen	Moved to Gamla Ullevi.
September 8, 9, 2012	Kent	The Hop Farm Country Park	Moved to Wembley Arena.
March 9, 2013	Regina	Brandt Centre	Postponed to April 28, 2013 due illness in the band.
March 11, 2013	Winnipeg	MTS Centre	Postponed to April 26, 2013 due to illness in the band.
April 21, 2013	St. John's	Mile One Center	Cancelled due to Cohen's appearance at the Juno awards.
July 12, 2013	Mannheim	SAP Arena	Postponed to June 28, 2013.
September 5, 2013	Leeds	First Direct Arena	Postponed to September 7, 2013 due to religious holiday.
September 14, 2013	London	O_{2} Arena	Postponed to September 15, 2013 due to religious holiday.
November 17, 2013	Sydney	Sydney Entertainment Centre	Postponed to December 2, 2013 and moved to Sydney Opera House.
December 9, 2013	Melbourne	Rod Laver Arena	Moved to Palais Theatre.

== Critical response ==
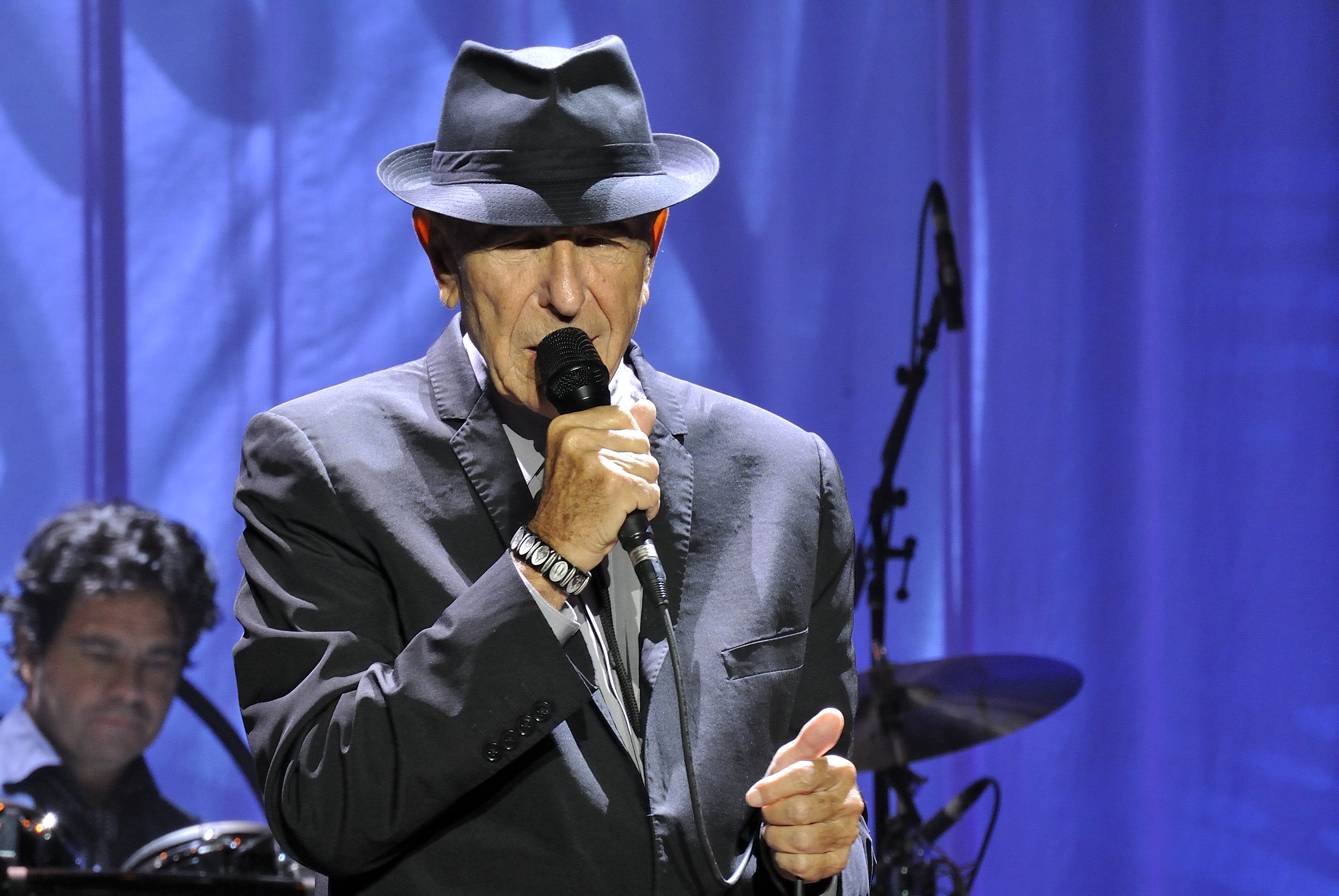
Leonard Cohen at King's Garden, Odense, Denmark, during the Old Ideas World Tour (17 August 2013)

The tour received universal praise from media and fans alike. Guido Lauwaert (Knack) wrote about opening night "The 78-year-old poet and singer seems 50 years younger for the duration of the concert. What strikes me is a total lack of false feelings…". Bart Steenhaut (DeMorgen) gave high praise to the musicians and Cohen himself, saying "Everyone was given ample opportunity to solo, and both backup singer – Sharon Robinson and the British Webb Sisters – were handed Cohen songs which they could shine on. Cohen himself singing downright excellent, though his deep, almost otherworldly baritone had not much variation in the set, exactly why was it right that the ladies often introduced a different timbre, and the rest of the band – all virtuoso with an impressive track record – could demonstrate their skill." Another reviewer (Robert Heller of Bloomberg Businessweek) states of the Berlin show in 2012 that "On record, Cohen has tended toward more spartan sounds, stripped back to just his voice and an acoustic guitar. Live, he has assembled an immaculate band. It plays with a manicured sweetness: A mandolin and violin add spice and color, a Hammond organ richness and depth. The Webb Sisters and Sharon Robinson provide luminous backing, careful arrangements making full use of each singer's tone."

Especially Cohen's appearance on stage found praise by many reviewers. Craig Jones of eGigs (UK) states of the concert at the Wembley Arena, "He may refer to himself on the self-deprecating Going Home as "a lazy bastard living in a suit", but Cohen is in fact quite the opposite. Just two weeks away from his 78th birthday, the fact that he is still able to deliver a three and a half hour set of intense beauty, melancholy and drama is quite a feat. He may be promoting ‘Old Ideas’, but still after all this time, those ideas remain the very best.".

== Songs performed ==
Songs performed

Songs of Leonard Cohen

- "Hey, That's No Way to Say Goodbye"
- "Sisters of Mercy"
- "So Long, Marianne"
- "Suzanne"

Songs from a Room

- "Bird on the Wire"
- "The Partisan"

Songs of Love and Hate

- "Avalanche"
- "Famous Blue Raincoat"
- "Joan of Arc"

New Skin for the Old Ceremony

- "Chelsea Hotel #2"
- "I Tried to Leave You"
- "Lover Lover Lover"
- "Who by Fire"
- "Field Commander Cohen"

Recent Songs

- "The Guests"
- "The Gypsy's Wife"

Various Positions

- "Coming Back to You" (performed by the Webb Sisters)
- "Dance Me to the End of Love"
- "Hallelujah"
- "Heart with No Companion"
- "If It Be Your Will" (performed by the Webb Sisters)
- "Night Comes On"

I'm Your Man

- "Ain't No Cure for Love"
- "Everybody Knows"
- "First We Take Manhattan"
- "I Can't Forget"
- "I'm Your Man"
- "Take This Waltz"
- "Tower of Song"

The Future

- "Anthem"
- "Closing Time"
- "Democracy"
- "Light as the Breeze"
- "The Future"
- "Waiting for the Miracle"

Ten New Songs

- "A Thousand Kisses Deep" (performed as a recitation)
- "Alexandra Leaving" (performed by Sharon Robinson)
- "In My Secret Life"

Old Ideas

- "Amen"
- "Anyhow"
- "Banjo"
- "Come Healing"
- "Crazy to Love You"
- "Darkness"
- "Different Sides"
- "Going Home"
- "Show Me the Place"

Other (non-album songs)

- "I've Got a Secret"
- "Feels So Good"

Cover songs

- "Save the Last Dance for Me"
- "La Manic"
- "Choices"

== Band ==
- Leonard Cohen – vocals, acoustic guitar, keyboard
- Roscoe Beck – bass, musical director
- Sharon Robinson – vocals
- Rafael Gayol – drums, percussion
- Neil Larsen – keyboards, accordion
- Mitch Watkins – guitars
- Javier Mas – laúd, bandurria, guitar
- Alexandru Bublitchi – violin
- Mike Scoble* – harmonica, tour manager

The Webb Sisters:

- Charley Webb – backing vocals, guitar
- Hattie Webb – backing vocals, harp

*Scoble only performs as a guest performer in one song, 'Darkness', though he has not appeared every night.
