= Leonard Cohen Tour 2008–2010 =

2008–10 concert tour by Leonard Cohen

Leonard Cohen World Tour
- World tour by Leonard Cohen
- Start date: May 11, 2008
- End date: December 11, 2010
- Legs: 9
- No. of shows: 84 in North America; 136 in Europe; 26 in Oceania; 1 in Middle East; 247 in total

Leonard Cohen concert chronology
- The Future World Tour (1993); Leonard Cohen Tour 2008–2010 (2008–10); Old Ideas World Tour (2012)

In January 2008, Leonard Cohen announced a long-anticipated world tour. It would be Cohen's first tour in 15 years.

== Background ==
=== 2008 tour ===
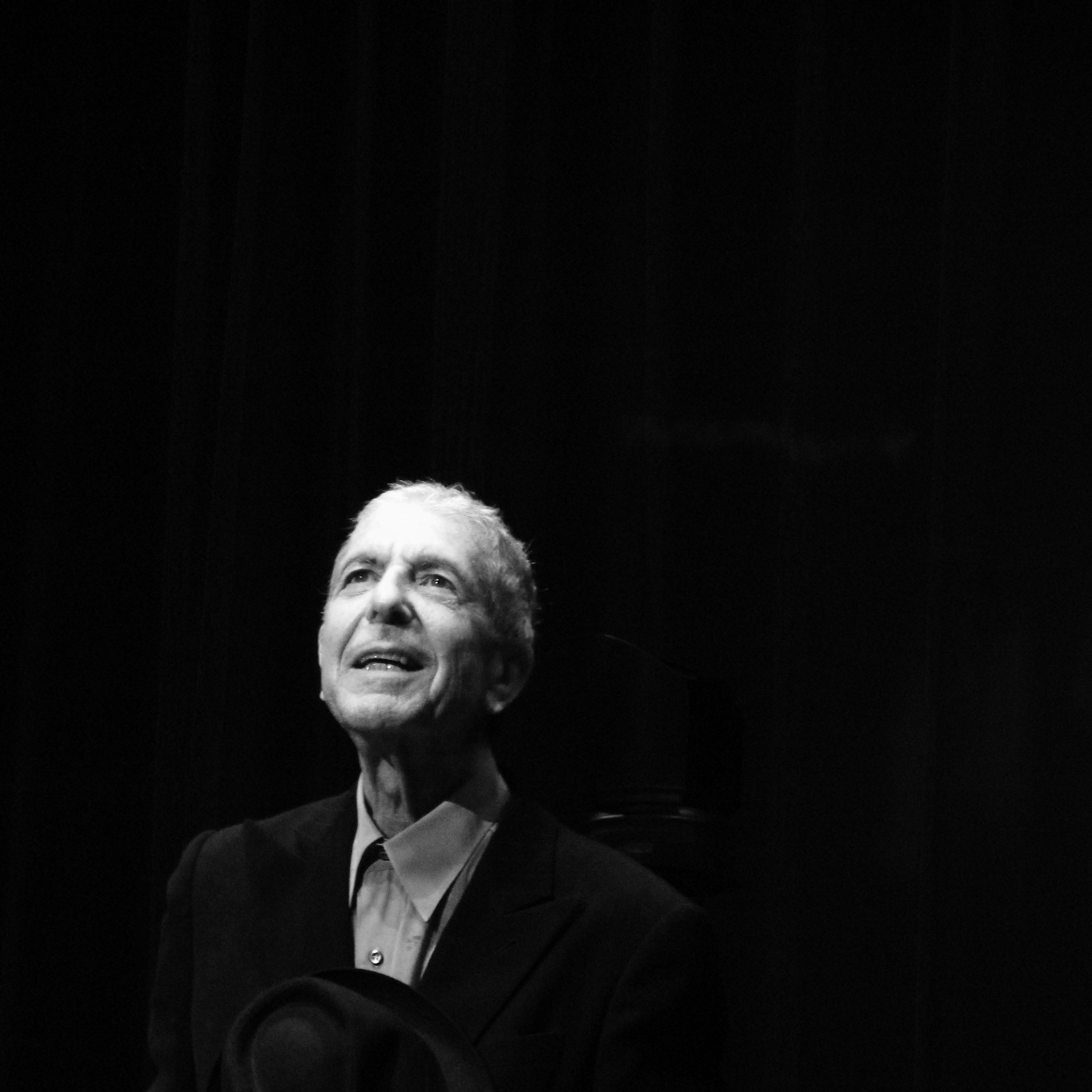
2008 concert tour

13 January 2008, Cohen quietly announced a long-anticipated concert tour. The tour, Cohen's first in 15 years, began 11 May in Fredericton, New Brunswick to wide critical acclaim, and was extended until Winter of 2010. The schedule of the first leg in Summer of 2008 encompassed Canada and Europe, including performances at The Big Chill, the Montreal Jazz Festival, and on the Pyramid Stage at the 2008 Glastonbury Festival on 29 June 2008. His performance at Glastonbury was hailed by many as the highlight of the festival, and his performance of "Hallelujah" as the sun went down received a rapturous reception and a lengthy ovation from a packed Pyramid Stage field. He also played two shows in London's O2 Arena, and in Dublin he gave a "milestone concert", while in Dublin he was the first performer to play an open-air concert at IMMA (Royal Hospital Kilmainham) ground, performing there on 13, 14 and 15 June 2008. In 2009, the performances were awarded Ireland's Meteor Music Award as the best international performance of the year.

In September, October and November 2008, Cohen gave a marathon tour of Europe, including stops in Austria, Ireland, Poland, Romania, Italy, Germany, and Scandinavia. In London, he played two more shows at the O2 Arena and two additional shows at the Royal Albert Hall. On 16 July 2008 Leonard Cohen also performed on the promenade of Edinburgh Castle Scotland to rapturous applause.

=== 2009 tour ===
The third leg of Cohen's World Tour 2008–2009 encompassed New Zealand and Australia from 20 January to 10 February 2009. In January 2009, The Pacific Tour first came to New Zealand. Simon Sweetman in The Dominion Post (Wellington) of 21 January wrote "It is hard work having to put this concert in to words so I'll just say something I have never said in a review before and will never say again: this was the best show I have ever seen." The Sydney Entertainment Centre show on 28 January sold out rapidly, which motivated promoters to announce a second show at the venue. The first performance was well-received, and the audience of 12,000 responded with five standing ovations. In response to hearing about the devastation to the Yarra Valley region of Victoria in Australia, Cohen donated $200,000 to the Victorian Bushfire Appeal in support of those affected by the extensive Black Saturday bushfires that razed the area just weeks after his performance at the Rochford Winery in the A Day on the Green concert. Melbourne's Herald Sun newspaper reported: "Tour promoter Frontier Touring said $200,000 would be donated on behalf of Cohen, fellow performer Paul Kelly and Frontier to aid victims of the bushfires."

On 19 February 2009, Cohen played his first American concert in fifteen years at the Beacon Theatre in New York City. The show, showcased as the special performance for fans, Leonard Cohen Forum members and press, was the only show in the whole three-year tour which was broadcast on the radio (NPR) and available as the free podcast.

The North American Tour of 2009 opened on 1 April and included the performance at the Coachella Valley Music and Arts Festival on Friday, 17 April 2009, in front of one of the largest outdoor theatre crowds in the history of the festival. His performance of Hallelujah was widely regarded as one of the highlights of the festival, thus repeating the major success of the 2008 Glastonbury appearance. The performance has been included on 2010 Songs from the Road live release. During this leg, Cohen regularly performed new song, "Lullaby".

On 1 July 2009, Cohen started his marathon European tour, his third in two years. The itinerary mostly included sport arenas and open air Summer festivals in Germany, UK, France, Spain, Ireland (the show at O2 in Dublin won him the second Meteor Music Award in a row), but also performances in Serbia in the Belgrade Arena, in the Czech Republic, Hungary, Turkey, and again in Romania. On 3 August, Cohen gave an open-air show at the Piazza San Marco in Venice.

On 18 September 2009, on the stage at a concert in Valencia, Spain, Cohen suddenly fainted halfway through performing his song "Bird on the Wire", the fourth in the two-act set list; Cohen was brought down backstage by his band members and then admitted to local hospital, while the concert was suspended. It was reported that Cohen had stomach problems, and possibly food poisoning. Three days later, on 21 September, on his 75th birthday, he performed in Barcelona. The show, last in Europe in 2009 and rumoured to be the last European concert ever, attracted many international fans, who lighted the green candles honouring Cohen's birthday, leading Cohen to give a special speech of thanks for the fans and Leonard Cohen Forum.

The last concert of this leg was held in Ramat Gan, Israel, on 24 September, three days after Cohen's 75th birthday, at Ramat Gan Stadium. The event was surrounded by public discussion due to a cultural boycott of Israel proposed by a number of musicians. Nevertheless, tickets for the Tel Aviv concert, Cohen's first performance in Israel since 1980, sold out in less than 24 hours. It was announced that the proceeds from the sale of the 47,000 tickets would go into a charitable fund in partnership with Amnesty International and would be used by Israeli and Palestinian peace groups for projects providing health services to children and bringing together Israeli veterans and former Palestinian fighters and the families of those killed in the conflict. However, on 17 August 2009, Amnesty International released a statement saying they were withdrawing from any involvement with the concert and its proceeds. Amnesty International later stated that its withdrawal was not due to the boycott but "the lack of support from Israeli and Palestinian NGOs." The Palestinian Campaign for the Academic and Cultural Boycott of Israel (PACBI) led the call for the boycott, claiming that Cohen was "intent on whitewashing Israel's colonial apartheid regime by performing in Israel." On 24 September at the Ramat Gan concert, Cohen was highly emotional about the Israeli-Palestinian NGO Bereaved Families for Peace. He mentioned the organization twice, saying "It was a while ago that I first heard of the work of the 'Bereaved Parents for Peace'. That there was this coalition of Palestinian and Israeli families who had lost so much in the conflict and whose depth of suffering had compelled them to reach across the border into the houses of the enemy. Into the houses of those, to locate them who had suffered as much as they had, and then to stand with them in aching confraternity, a witness to an understanding that is beyond peace and that is beyond confrontation. So, this is not about forgiving and forgetting, this is not about laying down one's arms in a time of war, this is not even about peace, although, God willing, it could be a beginning. This is about a response to human grief. A radical, unique and holy, holy, holy response to human suffering. Baruch Hashem, thank God, I bow my head in respect to the nobility of this enterprise." At the end of the show he blessed the crowd by the Priestly Blessing, a Jewish blessing offered by Kohanim. Cohen's surname derives from this Hebrew word for priest, thus identifying him as a Kohen.

The sixth leg of the 2008–2009 world tour went again to US, with fifteen shows in October and November, with the "final" show in San Jose. The final leg included two new songs, "Feels So Good" and "The Darkness". But at that point, Cohen's "World Tour 2010" was already announced with the European dates in March.

The 2009 world tour earned a reported $9.5 million, putting Cohen at number 39 on Billboard magazine's list of the year's top musical "money makers".

=== 2010 tour ===
Cohen's 2008–2009 world tour was prolonged into 2010. Originally scheduled to start in March, the first dozen of the original European dates were postponed to September and October due to Cohen's lower-back injury. Officially billed as the "World Tour 2010", the tour started on 25 July 2010 in Arena Zagreb, Croatia, where in the week of the show 16 of Cohen's albums simultaneously entered the Croatian Top 40, while Cohen's work was presented by the translation of Book of Mercy, two of Cohen's biographies, and with selection of poems in major literary magazine Quorum, while there was also the translation of Linda Hutcheon's work on Cohen's literary output. In December 2010, the national daily newspaper Vjesnik ranked Cohen's show among the five most important cultural event in Croatia in 2010, in the poll among dozen of intellectuals and writers; it was the only event ranked which was not actually Croatian. The tour continued through August, with stops in Austria, Belgium, Germany, Scandinavia, and Ireland, where on 31 July & 1 August 2010 Cohen performed at Lissadell House in County Sligo. It was Cohen's ninth Irish concert in just two years after a hiatus of more than 20 years. On 12 August, Cohen played the 200th show of the tour in Scandinavium, Gothenburg, Sweden, where he had already played in October 2008; the show was four hours long.

The Fall leg of the European tour started in early September with an open-air show in Florence, Italy, and continued through Germany, Portugal, Spain, Switzerland, and Austria, where Cohen performed at the famous open-air opera stage of Römersteinbruch bei St. Margarethen im Burgenland, and then continued with dates in France, Poland, Russia (Moscow's State Kremlin Palace), Slovenia and Slovakia. In Slovenia's brand new Arena Stožice, Cohen accepted Croatia's Porin music award for best foreign live video programme, which he won for his Live in London DVD. Cohen's last European show was held in Sibamac Arena, in Bratislava, Slovakia. The shows in late September and October were performed without Sharon Robinson, who left this tour leg due to heavy illness; the setlist omitted songs co-written by her, but old Cohen standards were added instead.

The third leg of the 2010 tour started on 28 October in New Zealand and continued in Australia, including an open-air concert at Hanging Rock near Melbourne. It was the first show ever organised at the site. The tour finished with seven special dates added in Vancouver, Portland, Victoria and Oakland, with two final shows in Las Vegas' The Colosseum at Caesars Palace on 10 and 11 December. The very last concert on 11 December was the 246th show on the world tour which started on 11 May 2008.

== Live releases ==
=== Live in London ===
On 31 March 2009, Cohen released Live in London, recorded on 17 July 2008 at London's O_{2} Arena and released on DVD and as a two-CD set. The album contains 25 songs and is over two-and-a-half hours long. It was the first official DVD in Cohen's recording career. The quotation on the album referred to one hundred five-star reviews the tour gained in the international press in 2008.

=== Songs From the Road ===
Songs From the Road appeared roughly 14 months after releasing Live in London , which preserved Cohen's July 2008 performance at London's O_{2} Arena. This collection features 12 songs from his 2008 and 2009 concert dates, and while this album isn't exactly a collection of rarities, it does feature a number of lesser-known tunes (such as "Heart with No Companion" and "That Don't Make It Junk") and variant versions of some of his more famous numbers (Cohen juggles the order of the verses on "Suzanne" and adds a new verse to "Bird on a Wire"). The selections were taken from a wide variety of locations, including Tel Aviv, Scotland, Finland, and Cohen's native Canada.

== Set lists ==
=== 2008 set list ===
This set list is representative of the performance on November 13, 2008 in London, England. It does not represent all concerts for the duration of the tour.

1. "Dance Me to the End of Love"
2. "The Future"
3. "Ain't No Cure for Love"
4. "Bird on the Wire"
5. "Everybody Knows"
6. "In My Secret Life"
7. "Who by Fire"
8. "Hey, That's No Way to Say Goodbye"
9. "That Don't Make It Junk"
10. "Anthem"

Intermission

11. "Tower of Song"
12. "Suzanne"
13. "The Gypsy's Wife"
14. "The Partisan"
15. "Boogie Street"
16. "Hallelujah"
17. "I'm Your Man"
18. "A Thousand Kisses Deep"
19. "Take This Waltz"

Encore

20. "So Long, Marianne"
21. "First We Take Manhattan"
22. "Famous Blue Raincoat"
23. "If It Be Your Will"
24. "Democracy"
25. "I Tried to Leave You"
26. "Whither Thou Goest"

=== 2009 set list ===
This set list is representative of the performance on October 23, 2009 in New York City, New York. It does not represent all concerts for the duration of the tour.

1. "Dance Me to the End of Love"
2. "The Future"
3. "Ain't No Cure for Love"
4. "Bird on the Wire"
5. "Everybody Knows"
6. "In My Secret Life"
7. "Who by Fire"
8. "Chelsea Hotel #2"
9. "Waiting for the Miracle"
10. "The Flood"
11. "Anthem"

Intermission

12. "Tower of Song"
13. "Suzanne"
14. "Sisters of Mercy"
15. "The Gypsy's Wife"
16. "The Partisan"
17. "Boogie Street"
18. "Hallelujah"
19. "I'm Your Man"
20. "A Thousand Kisses Deep"
21. "Take This Waltz"

Encores

22. "So Long, Marianne"
23. "First We Take Manhattan"
24. "Famous Blue Raincoat"
25. "If It Be Your Will"
26. "Closing Time"
27. "I Tried to Leave You"

=== 2010 set list ===
This set list is representative of the performance on November 30, 2010 in Victoria, British Columbia. It does not represent all concerts for the duration of the tour.

1. "Dance Me to the End of Love"
2. "The Future"
3. "Ain't No Cure for Love"
4. "Bird on the Wire"
5. "Everybody Knows"
6. "In My Secret Life"
7. "Who by Fire"
8. "Darkness"
9. "Chelsea Hotel #2"
10. "Waiting for the Miracle"
11. "Anthem"

Intermission

12. "Tower of Song"
13. "Suzanne"
14. "Avalanche"
15. "A Singer Must Die"
16. "Sisters of Mercy"
17. "The Gypsy's Wife"
18. "The Partisan"
19. "Boogie Street"
20. "Hallelujah"
21. "I'm Your Man"
22. "A Thousand Kisses Deep"
23. "Take This Waltz"

Encores

24. "So Long, Marianne"
25. "If It Be Your Will"
26. "Closing Time"
27. "I Tried to Leave You"

== Tour dates ==
Date	City	Country	Venue	Tickets Sold/Available	Box Office
North America
May 11, 2008	Fredericton	Canada	Fredericton Playhouse	—N/a	—N/a
May 12, 2008	Halifax	Canada	Rebecca Cohn Auditorium	—N/a	—N/a
May 13, 2008	Halifax	Canada	Rebecca Cohn Auditorium	—N/a	—N/a
May 15, 2008	Halifax	Canada	Rebecca Cohn Auditorium	—N/a	—N/a
May 16, 2008	Halifax	Canada	Rebecca Cohn Auditorium	—N/a	—N/a
May 17, 2008	Halifax	Canada	Rebecca Cohn Auditorium	—N/a	—N/a
May 18, 2008	Charlottetown	Canada	Confederation Centre of the Arts	—N/a	—N/a
May 20, 2008	Glace Bay	Canada	The Savoy Theatre	—N/a	—N/a
May 21, 2008	Glace Bay	Canada	The Savoy Theatre	—N/a	—N/a
May 23, 2008	Moncton	Canada	Théâtre Capitol Moncton	—N/a	—N/a
May 25, 2008	St. John's	Canada	Holy Heart Theatre	—N/a	—N/a
May 26, 2008	St. John's	Canada	Holy Heart Theatre	—N/a	—N/a
May 27, 2008	St. John's	Canada	Holy Heart Theatre	—N/a	—N/a
May 30, 2008	Saguenay	Canada	Auditorium Dufour	—N/a	—N/a
May 31, 2008	Saguenay	Canada	Auditorium Dufour	—N/a	—N/a
June 2, 2008	Kitchener	Canada	Centre In The Square	—N/a	—N/a
June 3, 2008	Hamilton	Canada	Hamilton Place Theatre	—N/a	—N/a
June 4, 2008	Hamilton	Canada	Hamilton Place Theatre	—N/a	—N/a
June 6, 2008	Toronto	Canada	Sony Centre for the Performing Arts	—N/a	—N/a
June 7, 2008	Toronto	Canada	Sony Centre for the Performing Arts	—N/a	—N/a
June 8, 2008	Toronto	Canada	Sony Centre for the Performing Arts	—N/a	—N/a
June 9, 2008	Toronto	Canada	Sony Centre for the Performing Arts	—N/a	—N/a
Europe
June 13, 2008	Dublin	Ireland	Irish Museum of Modern Art	36,715 / 37,500 (98%)	$6,171,090
June 14, 2008	Dublin	Ireland	Irish Museum of Modern Art	36,715 / 37,500 (98%)	$6,171,090
June 15, 2008	Dublin	Ireland	Irish Museum of Modern Art	36,715 / 37,500 (98%)	$6,171,090
June 17, 2008	Manchester	England	Manchester Opera House	7,354 / 8,000 (92%)	$1,059,782
June 18, 2008	Manchester	England	Manchester Opera House	7,354 / 8,000 (92%)	$1,059,782
June 19, 2008	Manchester	England	Manchester Opera House	7,354 / 8,000 (92%)	$1,059,782
June 20, 2008	Manchester	England	Manchester Opera House	7,354 / 8,000 (92%)	$1,059,782
North America
June 23, 2008	Montreal	Canada	Place des Arts	— (Note: The June 23, 2008 concert in Montreal is a part of the Montreal Jazz Festival.)	
June 24, 2008	Montreal	Canada	Place des Arts	—	
June 25, 2008	Montreal	Canada	Place des Arts	—	
Europe
June 29, 2008	Pilton	England	Worthy Farm	— (Note: The June 29, 2008 concert in Pilton is a part of Glastonbury Festival.)	
July 1, 2008	Oslo	Norway	Bislett Stadion	13,879 / 20,000 (69%)	$1,643,163
July 3, 2008	Helsingborg	Sweden	Sofiero Slott	6,943 / 15,000 (46%)	$923,719
July 5, 2008	Copenhagen	Denmark	Rosenborg Castle	10,651 / 15,000 (71%)	$1,905,089
July 6, 2008	Århus	Denmark	Rådhusparken	8,793 / 15,000 (59%)	$1,434,877
July 8, 2008	Montreux	Switzerland	Auditorium Stravinski	— (Note: The July 8, 2008 concert in Montreux is a part of the Montreux Jazz Festival.)	
July 9, 2008	Lyon	France	Ancient Theatre of Fourvière	— (Note: The July 8, 2008 concert in Lyon is a part of Les Nuits de Fourvière.)	
July 10, 2008	Bruges	Belgium	Minnewaterpark	—N/a	—N/a
July 12, 2008	Amsterdam	Netherlands	Cultuurpark Westergasfabriek	12,429 / 15,000 (83%)	$1,160,340
July 16, 2008	Edinburgh	Scotland	Edinburgh Castle	8,391 / 10,000 (84%)	$856,154
July 17, 2008	London	England	The O_{2} Arena	15,627 / 16,000 (98%)	$1,915,769
July 19, 2008	Lisbon	Portugal	Passeio Marítimo de Algés	—N/a	—N/a
July 20, 2008	Benicàssim	Spain	Benicàssim Festival Grounds	— (Note: The July 20, 2008 concert in Benicàssim is a part of Festival Internacional de Benicàssim.)	
July 22, 2008	Nice	France	Place Massena	— (Note: The July 22, 2008 concert in Nice is a part of the Nice Jazz.)	
July 25, 2008	Lörrach	Germany	Lörrach Burghof	—N/a	—N/a
July 27, 2008	Lucca	Italy	Piazza Napoleone	— (Note: The July 27, 2008 concert in Lucca is a part of the Lucca Summer Festival.)	
July 28, 2008	Rome	Italy	Auditorium Parco della Musica	—N/a	—N/a
July 30, 2008	Athens	Greece	Terra Vibe Park	—N/a	—N/a
August 3, 2008	Ledbury	England	Eastnor Castle	— (Note: The August 3, 2008 concert in Ledbury is a part of The Big Chill.)	
September 21, 2008	Bucharest	Romania	Stadionul Arcul de Triumf	—N/a	—N/a
September 24, 2008	Vienna	Austria	Wierner Konzerthaus	—N/a	—N/a
September 25, 2008	Vienna	Austria	Wierner Konzerthaus	—N/a	—N/a
September 27, 2008	Prague	Czech Republic	Tesla Arena	—N/a	—N/a
September 29, 2008	Wrocław	Poland	Hala Stulecia	—N/a	—N/a
October 1, 2008	Warsaw	Poland	Torwar Hall	—N/a	—N/a
October 4, 2008	Berlin	Germany	O_{2} World Berlin	—N/a	—N/a
October 6, 2008	Munich	Germany	Olympiahalle	—N/a	—N/a
October 10, 2008	Helsinki	Finland	Hartwall Areena	—N/a	—N/a
October 12, 2008	Gothenburg	Sweden	Scandinavium	—N/a	—N/a
October 15, 2008	Stockholm	Sweden	Globen Arena	—N/a	—N/a
October 17, 2008	Copenhagen	Denmark	Forum Copenhagen	—N/a	—N/a
October 19, 2008	Brussels	Belgium	Forest National	—N/a	—N/a
October 20, 2008	Brussels	Belgium	Forest National	—N/a	—N/a
October 23, 2008	Milan	Italy	Teatro degli Arcimboldi	—N/a	—N/a
October 25, 2008	Zürich	Switzerland	Hallenstadion	—N/a	—N/a
October 27, 2008	Geneva	Switzerland	SEG Geneva Arena	—N/a	—N/a
October 29, 2008	Frankfurt	Germany	Festhalle Frankfurt	—N/a	—N/a
October 31, 2008	Hamburg	Germany	O_{2} World Hamburg	—N/a	—N/a
November 2, 2008	Oberhausen	Germany	König Pilsener Arena	—N/a	—N/a
November 3, 2008	Rotterdam	Netherlands	Rotterdam Ahoy	—N/a	—N/a
November 5, 2008	Glasgow	Scotland	Clyde Auditorium	—N/a	—N/a
November 6, 2008	Glasgow	Scotland	Clyde Auditorium	—N/a	—N/a
November 8, 2008	Cardiff	Wales	Cardiff International Arena	—N/a	—N/a
November 11, 2008	Bournemouth	England	Bournemouth International Centre	—N/a	—N/a
November 13, 2008	London	England	The O_{2} Arena	—N/a	—N/a
November 14, 2008	London	England	The O_{2} Arena	—N/a	—N/a
November 17, 2008	London	England	Royal Albert Hall	—N/a	—N/a
November 18, 2008	London	England	Royal Albert Hall	—N/a	—N/a
November 22, 2008	Birmingham	England	LG Arena	—N/a	—N/a
November 24, 2008	Paris	France	L'Olympia	—N/a	—N/a
November 25, 2008	Paris	France	L'Olympia	—N/a	—N/a
November 26, 2008	Paris	France	L'Olympia	—N/a	—N/a
November 28, 2008	Brighton	England	Brighton Centre	—N/a	—N/a
November 30, 2008	Manchester	England	Manchester Evening News Arena	—N/a	—N/a
Oceania
January 20, 2009	Wellington	New Zealand	TSB Bank Arena	—N/a	—N/a
January 22, 2009	Auckland	New Zealand	Vector Arena	—N/a	—N/a
January 24, 2009	Coldstream	Australia	Rochford Winery	—N/a	—N/a
January 26, 2009	Adelaide	Australia	Leconfield Winery	—N/a	—N/a
January 28, 2009	Sydney	Australia	Sydney Entertainment Centre	—N/a	—N/a
January 29, 2009	Sydney	Australia	Sydney Entertainment Centre	—N/a	—N/a
January 31, 2009	Hunter Valley	Australia	Bimbadgen Estate	—N/a	—N/a
February 1, 2009	Bowral	Australia	Centennial Vineyards	—N/a	—N/a
February 3, 2009	Queensland	Australia	Brisbane Entertainment Centre	8,284 / 10,000 (83%)	$776,456
February 5, 2009	Melbourne	Australia	Rod Laver Arena	17,567 / 17,700 (99%)	$1,605,568 (Note: The score data is combined from the shows held at the Rod Laver Arena on February 5 and 10 2009.)
February 7, 2009	Swan Valley	Australia	Sandalford Winery	—N/a	—N/a
February 10, 2009	Melbourne	Australia	Rod Laver Arena	—	
North America
February 19, 2009	New York City	United States	Beacon Theatre	2,475 / 2,475 (100%)	$313,120
April 1, 2009	Austin	United States	Michael and Susan Dell Hall	4,725 / 4,725 (100%)	$449,745
April 2, 2009	Austin	United States	Michael and Susan Dell Hall	4,725 / 4,725 (100%)	$449,745
April 3, 2009	Grand Prairie	United States	Nokia Live at Grand Prairie	—N/a	—N/a
April 5, 2009	Phoenix	United States	Dodge Theatre	—N/a	—N/a
April 7, 2009	San Diego	United States	Copley Symphony Hall	—N/a	—N/a
April 10, 2009	Los Angeles	United States	Nokia Theatre L.A. Live	13,564 / 13,564 (100%)	$1,251,786
April 11, 2009	Los Angeles	United States	Nokia Theatre L.A. Live	13,564 / 13,564 (100%)	$1,251,786
April 13, 2009	Oakland	United States	Paramount Theatre	8,979 / 8,979 (100%)	$973,345
April 14, 2009	Oakland	United States	Paramount Theatre	8,979 / 8,979 (100%)	$973,345
April 15, 2009	Oakland	United States	Paramount Theatre	8,979 / 8,979 (100%)	$973,345
April 17, 2009	Indio	United States	Empire Polo Club	— (Note: The April 17, 2009 concert in Indio is a part of Coachella Valley Music and Arts Festival.)	
April 19, 2009	Vancouver	Canada	General Motors Place	8,632 / 8,632 (100%)	$937,142
April 21, 2009	Victoria	Canada	Save-On-Foods Memorial Centre	5,663 / 5,663 (100%)	$436,743
April 23, 2009	Seattle	United States	WaMu Theater	—N/a	—N/a
April 25, 2009	Edmonton	Canada	Rexall Place	7,901 / 7,901 (100%)	$680,204
April 26, 2009	Calgary	Canada	Jack Singer Concert Hall	—N/a	—N/a
April 28, 2009	Saskatoon	Canada	Credit Union Centre	—N/a	—N/a
April 30, 2009	Winnipeg	Canada	MTS Centre	—N/a	—N/a
May 3, 2009	Minneapolis	United States	Orpheum Theatre	—N/a	—N/a
May 5, 2009	Chicago	United States	Chicago Theatre	7,029 / 7,029 (100%)	$832,539
May 6, 2009	Chicago	United States	Chicago Theatre	7,029 / 7,029 (100%)	$832,539
May 9, 2009	Detroit	United States	Fox Theatre	—N/a	—N/a
May 11, 2009	Columbia	United States	Merriweather Post Pavilion	—N/a	—N/a
May 12, 2009	Philadelphia	United States	Philadelphia Academy of Music	—N/a	—N/a
May 14, 2009	Waterbury	United States	Palace Theater	—N/a	—N/a
May 16, 2009	New York City	United States	Radio City Music Hall	11,864 / 11,864 (100%)	$1,665,982
May 17, 2009	New York City	United States	Radio City Music Hall	11,864 / 11,864 (100%)	$1,665,982
May 19, 2009	Hamilton	Canada	Copps Coliseum	6,940 / 6,940 (100%)	$639,472
May 21, 2009	Quebec City	Canada	Pavillon de la Jeunesse	—N/a	—N/a
May 22, 2009	Kingston	Canada	K-Rock Centre	—N/a	—N/a
May 24, 2009	London	Canada	John Labatt Centre	—N/a	—N/a
May 25, 2009	Ottawa	Canada	Southam Hall	4,662 / 4,662 (100%)	$734,824
May 26, 2009	Ottawa	Canada	Southam Hall	4,662 / 4,662 (100%)	$734,824
May 29, 2009	Boston	United States	Wang Theatre	7,016 / 7,016 (100%)	$838,697
May 30, 2009	Boston	United States	Wang Theatre	7,016 / 7,016 (100%)	$838,697
June 2, 2009	Morrison	United States	Red Rocks Amphitheatre	—N/a	—N/a
Europe
July 1, 2009	Cologne	Germany	Lanxess Arena	—N/a	—N/a
July 2, 2009	Berlin	Germany	O_{2} World Berlin	—N/a	—N/a
July 4, 2009	Antwerp	Belgium	Sportpaleis	—N/a	—N/a
July 6, 2009	Nantes	France	Le Zénith Nantes Métropole	—N/a	—N/a
July 7, 2009	Paris	France	Palais Omnisports de Paris-Bercy	—N/a	—N/a
July 9, 2009	Toulouse	France	Zénith de Toulouse	—N/a	—N/a
July 11, 2009	Weybridge	England	Mercedes-Benz World	—N/a	—N/a
July 14, 2009	Liverpool	England	Echo Arena Liverpool	—N/a	—N/a
July 16, 2009	Langesund	Norway	Mandssangforening	— (Note: The July 16, 2009 concert in Langesund is a part of Langesund International Shantyfestival.)	
July 17, 2009	Molde	Norway	Molde Festival Grounds	— (Note: The July 17, 2009 concert in Molde is a part of Moldejazz.)	
July 19, 2009	Dublin	Ireland	The O_{2}	—N/a	—N/a
July 20, 2009	Dublin	Ireland	The O_{2}	—N/a	—N/a
July 22, 2009	Dublin	Ireland	The O_{2}	—N/a	—N/a
July 23, 2009	Dublin	Ireland	The O_{2}	—N/a	—N/a
July 26, 2009	Belfast	Northern Ireland	Odyssey Arena	—N/a	—N/a
July 30, 2009	Lisbon	Portugal	Pavilhão Atlântico	—N/a	—N/a
July 31, 2009	León	Spain	Leon Arena	—N/a	—N/a
August 3, 2009	Venice	Italy	San Marco	—N/a	—N/a
August 5, 2009	Istanbul	Turkey	Cemil Topuzlu Open-Air Theatre	—N/a	—N/a
August 6, 2009	Istanbul	Turkey	Cemil Topuzlu Open-Air Theatre	—N/a	—N/a
August 11, 2009	Palma	Spain	Palma Arena	—N/a	—N/a
August 13, 2009	Vigo	Spain	Vigo Festival Grounds	— (Note: The August 13, 2009 concert in Vigo is a part of Festival Castrelos.)	
August 15, 2009	Girona	Spain	Girona Festival Grounds	— (Note: The August 15, 2009 concert in Girona is a part of Festival Cap Roig.)	
August 16, 2009	Colmar	France	Colmar Parc des Expositions	— (Note: The August 16, 2009 concert in Colmar is a part of Foire aux Vins de Colmar Festival.)	
August 18, 2009	Vienne	France	Theatre Antique	—N/a	—N/a
August 20, 2009	Nîmes	France	Arena of Nîmes	— (Note: The August 20, 2009 concert in Nîmes is a part of Festival de Nîmes.)	
August 22, 2009	Monte Carlo	Monaco	Monaco Sporting Club	— (Note: The August 22 and 23, 2009 concert in Nîmes is a part of Monte-Carlo Sporting Summer Festival.)	
August 23, 2009	Monte Carlo	Monaco	Monaco Sporting Club	—	
August 26, 2009	Wiesen	Austria	Festivalgelande Wiesen	—N/a	—N/a
August 28, 2009	Bratislava	Slovakia	Incheba Expo	—N/a	—N/a
August 29, 2009	Prague	Czech Republic	O_{2} Arena	—N/a	—N/a
August 31, 2009	Budapest	Hungary	Budapest Sports Arena	—N/a	—N/a
September 2, 2009	Belgrade	Serbia	Belgrade Arena	—N/a	—N/a
September 4, 2009	Bucharest	Romania	Bucharest Youth Stadium	—N/a	—N/a
September 12, 2009	Madrid	Spain	Palacio de Deportes de la Comunidad	—N/a	—N/a
September 13, 2009	Granada	Spain	Colisseum	—N/a	—N/a
September 15, 2009	Zaragoza	Spain	Príncipe Felipe Arena	—N/a	—N/a
September 17, 2009	Barakaldo	Spain	Bilbao Arena	—N/a	—N/a
September 21, 2009	Barcelona	Spain	Palau Sant Jordi	—N/a	—N/a
Middle East
September 24, 2009	Ramat Gan	Israel	Ramat Gan Stadium	—N/a	—N/a
North America
October 17, 2009	Sunrise	United States	BankAtlantic Center	—N/a	—N/a
October 19, 2009	Tampa	United States	St. Pete Times Forum	—N/a	—N/a
October 20, 2009	Atlanta	United States	Fox Theatre	—N/a	—N/a
October 22, 2009	Philadelphia	United States	Wachovia Spectrum	—N/a	—N/a
October 23, 2009	New York City	United States	Madison Square Garden	13,354 / 13,354 (100%)	$1,458,089
October 25, 2009	Cleveland	United States	Allen Theatre	—N/a	—N/a
October 27, 2009	Columbus	United States	Columbus Palace Theatre	—N/a	—N/a
October 29, 2009	Rosemont	United States	Rosemont Theatre	—N/a	—N/a
November 1, 2009	Asheville	United States	Thomas Wolfe Auditorium	—N/a	—N/a
November 3, 2009	Durham	United States	Durham Performing Arts Center	—N/a	—N/a
November 5, 2009	Nashville	United States	Tennessee Performing Arts Center	—N/a	—N/a
November 7, 2009	St. Louis	United States	Fox Theatre	—N/a	—N/a
November 9, 2009	Kansas City	United States	Midland Theatre	—N/a	—N/a
November 12, 2009	Las Vegas	United States	The Colosseum at Caesars Palace	3,228 / 3,228 (100%)	$413,097
November 13, 2009	San Jose	United States	HP Pavilion at San Jose	—N/a	—N/a
Europe
July 25, 2010	Zagreb	Croatia	Arena Zagreb	—N/a	—N/a
July 27, 2010	Salzburg	Austria	Salzburgarena	—N/a	—N/a
July 28, 2010	Graz	Austria	Stadthalle Graz	—N/a	—N/a
July 31, 2010	Sligo	Ireland	Lissadell House	—N/a	—N/a
August 1, 2010	Sligo	Ireland	Lissadell House	—N/a	—N/a
August 4, 2010	Malmö	Sweden	Malmö Arena	—N/a	—N/a
August 6, 2010	Oslo	Norway	Oslo Spektrum	—N/a	—N/a
August 8, 2010	Stockholm	Sweden	Ericsson Globe	—N/a	—N/a
August 10, 2010	Helsinki	Finland	Hartwall Areena	—N/a	—N/a
August 12, 2010	Gothenburg	Sweden	Scandinavium	—N/a	—N/a
August 14, 2010	Odense	Denmark	Engen	—N/a	—N/a
August 18, 2010	Berlin	Germany	Waldbühne	—N/a	—N/a
August 20, 2010	Ghent	Belgium	St. Peter's Square	—N/a	—N/a
August 21, 2010	Ghent	Belgium	St. Peter's Square	—N/a	—N/a
August 22, 2010	Ghent	Belgium	St. Peter's Square	—N/a	—N/a
September 1, 2010	Florence	Italy	Piazza Santa Croce	—N/a	—N/a
September 3, 2010	Wiesbaden	Germany	Wiesbaden Bowling Green	—N/a	—N/a
September 5, 2010	Burgenland	Austria	Roemersteinbruch	—N/a	—N/a
September 8, 2010	Basel	Switzerland	St. Jakobshalle	—N/a	—N/a
September 10, 2010	Lisbon	Portugal	Pavilhão Atlântico	—N/a	—N/a
September 12, 2010	Ourense	Spain	Pabellon Paco Paz	—N/a	—N/a
September 15, 2010	Caen	France	Zénith de Caen	—N/a	—N/a
September 17, 2010	Grenoble	France	Palais des Sports	—N/a	—N/a
September 19, 2010	Strasbourg	France	Zénith de Strasbourg	—N/a	—N/a
September 21, 2010	Marseille	France	Le Dôme de Marseille	—N/a	—N/a
September 23, 2010	Tours	France	Tours Grand Hall	—N/a	—N/a
September 25, 2010	Lille	France	Zénith de Lille	—N/a	—N/a
September 27, 2010	Hanover	Germany	TUI Arena	—N/a	—N/a
September 29, 2010	Dortmund	Germany	Westfalenhallen	—N/a	—N/a
October 1, 2010	Stuttgart	Germany	Hanns-Martin-Schleyer-Halle	—N/a	—N/a
October 4, 2010	Katowice	Poland	Spodek	—N/a	—N/a
October 7, 2010	Moscow	Russia	Grand Kremlin Palace	—N/a	—N/a
October 10, 2010	Warsaw	Poland	Torwar Hall	—N/a	—N/a
October 12, 2010	Ljubljana	Slovenia	Arena Stožice	—N/a	—N/a
October 13, 2010	Bratislava	Slovakia	Sibamac Arena	—N/a	—N/a
Oceania
October 28, 2010	Auckland	New Zealand	Vector Arena	13,876 / 20,000 (69%)	$1,424,410
October 29, 2010	Auckland	New Zealand	Vector Arena	13,876 / 20,000 (69%)	$1,424,410
October 31, 2010	Wellington	New Zealand	TSB Bank Arena	8,198 / 10,000 (82%)	$915,532
November 1, 2010	Wellington	New Zealand	TSB Bank Arena	8,198 / 10,000 (82%)	$915,532
November 3, 2010	Addington	New Zealand	CBS Canterbury Arena	7,315 / 7,543 (97%)	$915,887
November 6, 2010	Brisbane	Australia	Brisbane Entertainment Centre	9,207 / 9,652 (95%)	$1,717,520
November 8, 2010	Sydney	Australia	Acer Arena	16,952 / 17,360 (98%)	$2,929,150
November 9, 2010	Sydney	Australia	Acer Arena	16,952 / 17,360 (98%)	$2,929,150
November 12, 2010	Melbourne	Australia	Rod Laver Arena	21,834 / 22,268 (98%)	$3,627,720
November 13, 2010	Melbourne	Australia	Rod Laver Arena	21,834 / 22,268 (98%)	$3,627,720
November 15, 2010	Hobart	Australia	Derwent Entertainment Centre	4,438 / 4,438 (100%)	$663,365
November 18, 2010	Adelaide	Australia	Adelaide Entertainment Centre	6,550 / 8,500 (77%)	$994,233
November 20, 2010	Macedon	Australia	Hanging Rock	14,483 / 14,483 (100%)	$1,735,530
November 24, 2010	Perth	Australia	ME Bank Stadium	10,483 / 15,000 (70%)	$1,622,970
North America
November 30, 2010	Victoria	Canada	Save-On-Foods Memorial Centre	5,270 / 5,270 (100%)	$467,996
December 2, 2010	Vancouver	Canada	Rogers Arena	8,209 / 8,209 (100%)	$977,367
December 5, 2010	Oakland	United States	Paramount Theatre	5,994 / 5,994 (100%)	$691,196
December 6, 2010	Oakland	United States	Paramount Theatre	5,994 / 5,994 (100%)	$691,196
December 8, 2010	Portland	United States	Theater of Clouds	5,997 / 5,997 (100%)	$446,707
December 10, 2010	Las Vegas	United States	The Colosseum at Caesars Palace	5,777 / 5,777 (100%)	$744,667
December 11, 2010	Las Vegas	United States	The Colosseum at Caesars Palace	5,777 / 5,777 (100%)	$744,667

=== Cancellations and rescheduled shows ===
June 2, 2009	Morrison	Red Rocks Amphitheatre	Rescheduled to June 4, 2009
September 4, 2009	Bucharest	Piata Constitutiei	Moved to Iolanda Balas Soter Stadium
September 18, 2009	Valencia	Velódromo Lluis Puig	Cancelled after 3rd song
March 1, 2010	Caen	Le Zénith	Rescheduled to September 15, 2010.
March 3, 2010	Lille	Le Zénith	Rescheduled to September 25, 2010.
March 5, 2010	Strasbourg	Le Zénith	Rescheduled to September 19, 2010.
March 7, 2010	Marseille	Le Dome	Rescheduled to September 21, 2010.
March 9, 2010	Grenoble	Palais des Sports	Rescheduled to September 17, 2010.
March 11, 2010	Tours	Parc des Expositions	Rescheduled to September 23, 2010 and moved to Tours Grand Hall.
March 13, 2010	Bratislava	Incheba Expo Arena	Rescheduled to October 13, 2010 and moved to Sibamac Arena.
March 15, 2010	Zagreb	Arena Zagreb	Rescheduled to July 25, 2010.
March 18, 2010	Moscow	Kremlin Palace	Rescheduled to October 7, 2010.

== Musicians ==
- Leonard Cohen – vocals, acoustic guitar, keyboard
- Roscoe Beck – bass, backing vocals, musical director
- Sharon Robinson – vocals
- Rafael Bernardo Gayol – drums, percussion
- Neil Larsen – keyboards, accordion
- Javier Mas – laúd, bandurria, guitar
- Bob Metzger – guitar, pedal steel guitar, backing vocals
- Dino Soldo – saxophone, clarinet, harmonica, keyboard, backing vocals
- Charley Webb – backing vocals, guitar
- Hattie Webb – backing vocals, harp
