= Savages (The Webb Sisters album) =

2010 studio album by the Webb Sisters

Studio album by The Webb Sisters
- Released: 11 November 2010 (digital); 9 May 2011 (physical)
- Recorded: 2008–2010
- Genre: Folk rock
- Length: 46:47
- Label: Proper Records
- Producers: Peter Asher, The Webb Sisters

The Webb Sisters chronology
Daylight Crossing (2006)	Savages (2010)

Savages is a 2010 album by The Webb Sisters. The group's third album, it was recorded over an extended period of 3 years, just before and while the group were on tour as Leonard Cohen's backing singers and instrumentalists.

Produced by Peter Asher, musically, the album tried to distance itself from the more pop sound of their previous album and returned the group to their more folksy roots. Nine of the songs on the album had been released already on the group's 2008 and 2009 EPs Comes in Twos and The Other Side, which were released digitally and physically at concerts. Among the songs there is a live recording of Leonard Cohen's 1984 song "If It Be Your Will", recorded at a 2008 performance in The O2 Arena in London and featuring Cohen introducing the song. It was released as a single along with the title track. The album also includes the song "1000 Stars", which the group co-wrote with Chris Braide and was first recorded and released as a single by Australian singer Natalie Bassingthwaighte.

== Release and reception ==
The album was first released digitally on 11 November 2010, exclusively on iTunes Australia and New Zealand, coinciding with the group touring there with Cohen. The next month it was released on the US iTunes. The album got a physical CD release in Europe in May 2011, when the group secured a deal with Proper Records. In 2012, a vinyl release of the album was issued. The album charted at #132 in the group's native Britain.

The album was nominated for The 10th Annual Independent Music Awards in the Adult Contemporary category. They won the award for their song "Baroque Thoughts" in the same category.

== Track listing ==
No.	Title	Length
1.	"Baroque Thoughts"	3:32
2.	"Calling This A Life"	4:06
3.	"Words That Mobilise"	3:25
4.	"Savages"	3:20
5.	"Dark Sky"	1:53
6.	"Burn"	3:23
7.	"Amelie's Smile"	4:22
8.	"If It Be Your Will (with Leonard Cohen)"	5:14
9.	"In Your Father's Eyes"	3:48
10.	"Blue And You"	2:42
11.	"1000 Stars"	3:35
12.	"The Goodnight Song"	3:04
13.	"Yours Truly"	4:26

iTunes bonus track
No.	Title	Length
14.	"Please Please Me"	2:20

- The CD includes two enhanced videoclips of "Savages" and "Blue And You".
- The vinyl edition includes an orchestrated version of "If It Be Your Will", not featuring Cohen.

== Charts ==
Chart (2011)	Peak position
UK Albums Chart	132
