= Walls Can Fall =

Studio album by George Jones
- Released: October 27, 1992
- Recorded: July–August 1992
- Studio: GroundStar Studios, Javalina Recording Studios, Masterfonics, Recording Arts, Studio 6, and Woodland Digital Studios, Nashville, TN
- Genre: Country
- Length: 31:10
- Label: MCA Nashville
- Producer: Emory Gordy, Jr.

George Jones chronology
And Along Came Jones (1991)	Walls Can Fall (1992)	High-Tech Redneck (1993)

Singles from Walls Can Fall
- 1. "I Don't Need Your Rockin' Chair" Released: September 1992; 2. "Wrong's What I Do Best" Released: March 1993; 3. "Walls Can Fall" Released: June 1993

Professional ratings
Review scores
Source	Rating
AllMusic	2.5/5 stars
The Rolling Stone Album Guide	4/5 stars

Walls Can Fall is an album by American country music artist George Jones. This album was released in 1992 (see 1992 in country music) on the MCA Nashville Records. It peaked at number 24 on the Billboard Country Albums chart and number 77 on The Billboard 200 chart. Walls Can Fall went Gold in 1994.

== Track listing ==
No.	Title	Writer(s)	Length
1.	"I Don't Need Your Rockin' Chair"	Frank Dycus, Billy Yates, Kerry Kurt Phillips	3:29
2.	"Walls Can Fall"	Dycus, Yates, Bruce Bouton	3:10
3.	"Don't Send Me No Angels"	Wayne Kemp	3:21
4.	"Drive Me to Drink"	Michael Hoffman, Gene Dobbins	2:43
5.	"What Am I Doing There"	Buddy Brock, Zack Turner	3:48
6.	"Wrong's What I Do Best"	Dickey Lee, Freddy Weller, Mike Campbell	2:42
7.	"There's the Door"	Paul Nelson, Gene Nelson	2:38
8.	"You Must Have Walked Across My Mind Again"	Kemp, Warren Robb	2:54
9.	"The Bottle Let Me Down"	Merle Haggard	3:43
10.	"Finally Friday"	Dennis Robbins, Bobby Boyd, Warren Haynes, DeWayne Mize	2:45

== Personnel ==
- George Jones – vocals
- Reggie Young – guitar
- Steve Gibson – guitar
- Billy Joe Walker Jr. – guitar
- Biff Watson – guitar
- Sonny Garrish – pedal steel guitar
- Buddy Emmons – pedal steel guitar
- John Hughey – pedal steel guitar
- Emory Gordy Jr. – bass
- Owen Hale – drums
- Hargus "Pig" Robbins – piano
- John Barlow Jarvis – keyboards
- Glen Duncan – fiddle
- Stuart Duncan – fiddle
- Curtis Young – vocals
- Andrea Zonn – vocals
- Carol Chase – vocals
- Cindy Richardson – vocals
- Liana Young – vocals
- Patty Loveless – vocals
- Vince Gill – vocals
- Ron Gaddis – vocals

== Certifications ==
Region	Certification
United States (RIAA)	Gold
