= TSB Arena =

Indoor arena in Wellington, New Zealand

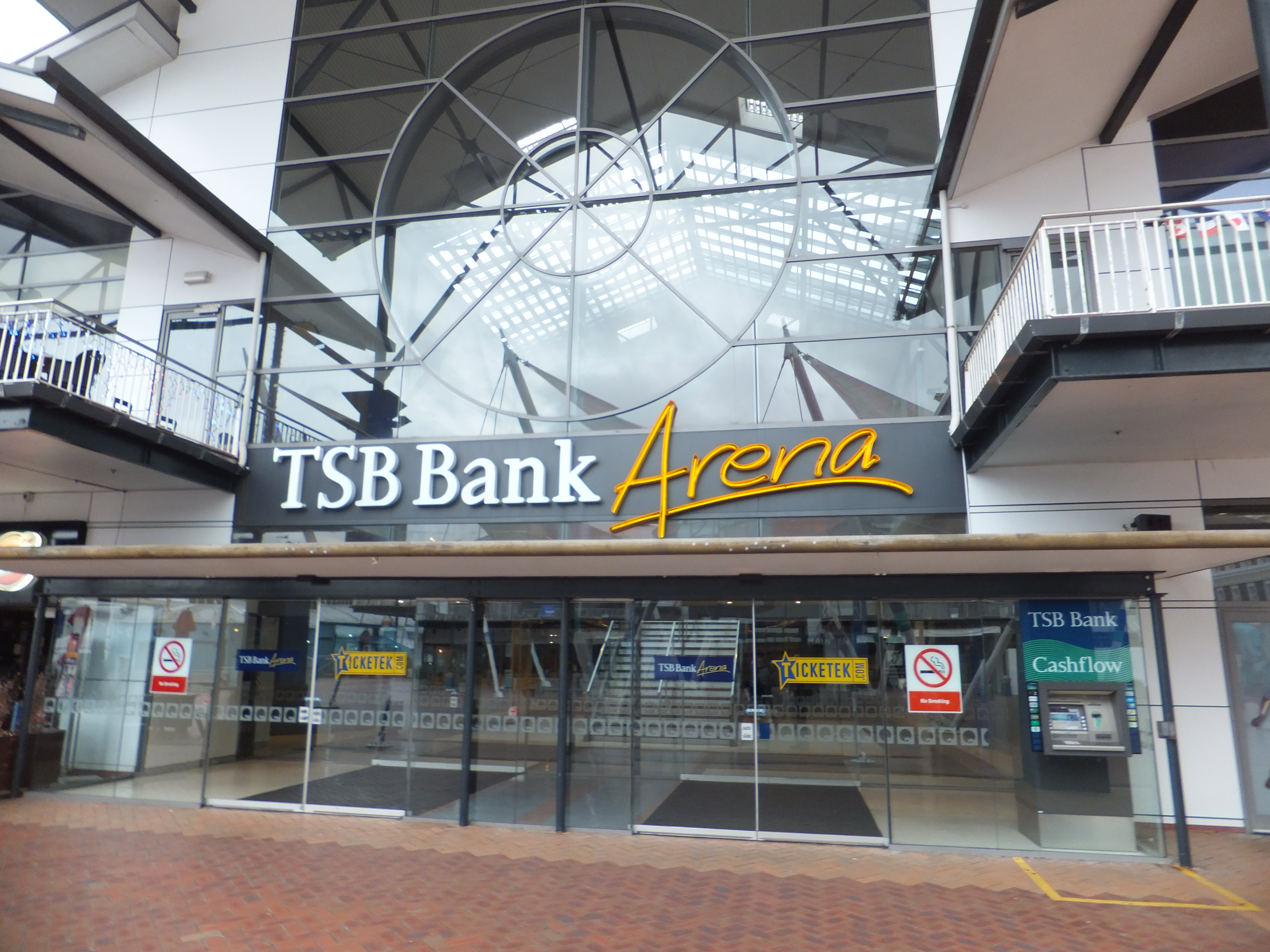
- Interactive map of TSB Arena
- Former names: Queens Wharf Events Centre (1995–2006)
- Address: 4 Queens Wharf; Wellington 6011, New Zealand
- Location: Wellington Central
- Coordinates: 41°17′8″S 174°46′44″E
- Owner: Wellington City Council
- Operator: Venues Wellington
- Capacity: 5,655

Construction
- Opened: 1995
- Expanded: 2005
- Architects: Craig, Craig & Moller

Tenants
- Wellington Saints (NBL) (1995–present); Central Pulse (ANZ) (2008–present); Richter City Roller Derby (WFTDA) (2009–present)

Website
- https://www.wellingtonnz.com/venues-wellington/our-venues/tsb-arena

The TSB Arena (formerly known as the Queens Wharf Events Centre and then TSB Bank Arena) is an indoor arena in Wellington that hosts basketball games, roller derby, music concerts, conventions and exhibitions.

== History ==
In the 1990s Lambton Harbour Management, a company controlled by Wellington City Council, was involved in developing Queens Wharf as an entertainment area. Two large buildings, Queens Wharf Retail Centre and Queens Wharf Events Centre, were officially opened by Sir Peter Blake on 18 November 1995. The buildings were designed by the architect to look like wharf sheds, but were criticised for being out of scale with other waterfront buildings. Lobby group Waterfront Watch described the events centre as "a monstrous eyesore resembling a Soviet ablution block". The retail centre was an immediate failure, and the building was sold in 1998 to be converted into office space. The events centre continued to operate, and in 2006 was renamed the TSB Bank Arena after TSB Bank bought the naming rights for an eight-year period.

When it was opened the events centre had capacity for between 3500 and 4000 spectators. There was seating on the ground floor and on a mezzanine floor, and all the seats were retractable. The main hall had a sprung wooden floor.

In 2002, then mayor Kerry Prendergast suggested that the events centre be converted into a convention centre, but in 2005 the number of seats was increased to 4,570 as part of a redevelopment and expansion plan. Further upgrades took place in 2014.

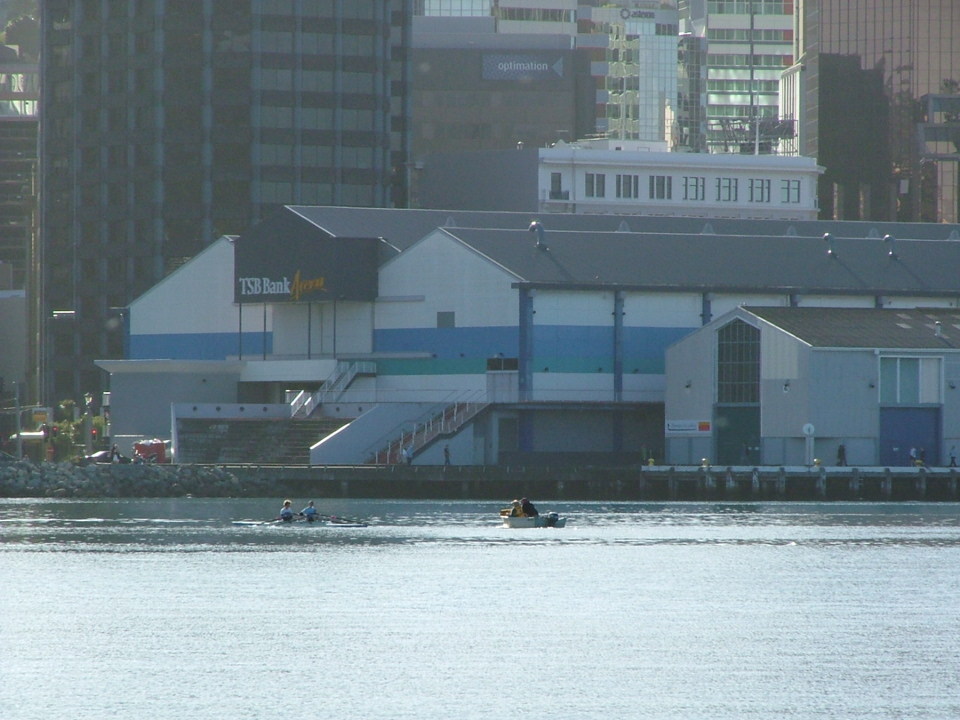
Exterior view of venue from Lambton Harbour (October 2007)

In a newspaper article in April 2007, the Wellington Architectural Centre rated TSB Arena as Wellington's second worst building (after New World Chaffers), saying it was inward-looking, unengaging and "awful" for its prime waterfront location. The architect responded:

Our original design was for a much lower-scale building with active edges for shops, restaurants and marine-related activities. During the development phase by the client the brief changed to include much larger and inward-looking facilities. The size and nature of the building grew dramatically, despite vigorous advocacy by us for the original design and scale. It went ahead in that form and proved to me how in the early 1990s, aggressive commercial attitudes resulted in questionable outcomes.

In July 2011 Venues Wellington (trading as Positively Wellington Venues), an organisation created from a merger of the St James Theatre Charitable Trust and the Wellington Convention Centre and controlled by Wellington City Council, began managing the arena along with five other venues in the city.

== About ==
The arena hosts basketball games and is the home arena for the Century City Saints and part-time home arena of the New Zealand Breakers when they play in Wellington. It was also the home arena for the Richter City Roller Derby, which started to play here in the middle of their 2009 season. It hosts expositions and conventions such as the Armageddon Pulp Expo and the DCM Book Fair. In 2005, the annual World of Wearable Art Awards (WOW) show moved from Nelson to Wellington, to the TSB Arena. In 2007 the first Māori Art Market was held in the arena before moving to the suburban Te Rauparaha Arena in Porirua City.

The arena also operates as a music venue, but does not have ideal acoustics and professional sound treatment; for example, the retractable stadium traps all reflections (early and late) also acting as a bass trap (wanted or unwanted), thus impairing a clear sound. Liam Gallagher of the band Oasis complained bitterly about the sound quality while performing at the venue in 1998. As a smaller live venue, TSB Arena is still able attract overseas acts.

== Concerts ==
Concerts held at TSB Arena
Date	Artists	Events
1996
4 May	Red Hot Chili Peppers	One Hot Minute Tour
1997
9 April	Tina Turner	Wildest Dreams Tour
10 April	Tina Turner	Wildest Dreams Tour
1998
29 January	Radiohead	OK Computer Tour
23 February	The Corrs	Talk on Corners World Tour
26 February	Pearl Jam	Yield Tour
10 March	Oasis	Be Here Now Tour
10 April	Van Halen	III Tour
17 April	Metallica	Poor Re-Touring Me Tour
10 September	Bob Dylan	Never Ending Tour 1998
30 November	Janet Jackson	The Velvet Rope Tour
1 December	Janet Jackson	The Velvet Rope Tour
3 December	Janet Jackson	The Velvet Rope Tour
1999
2 October	Alanis Morissette	Junkie Tour
2002
25 November	Pink	Party Tour
2008
10 May	Westlife	Back Home Tour
10 September	Disturbed	Indestructible Tour
29 October	Rihanna	Good Girl Gone Bad Tour
2 December	Kanye West	Glow in the Dark Tour
7 December	Alicia Keys	As I Am Tour
2009
20 January	Leonard Cohen	2008 - 2010 World Tour
2010
30 January	Them Crooked Vultures	Deserve the Future Tour
27 April	John Mayer	Battle Studies World Tour
14 August	Tiësto	Kaleidoscope World Tour
7 October	Paramore	Brand New Eyes World Tour
31 October	Leonard Cohen	Leonard Cohen Tour 2008-2010
1 November	Leonard Cohen	Leonard Cohen Tour 2008-2010
2011
4 May	Disturbed	Asylum Tour
10 May	Katy Perry	California Dreams Tour
26 October	Meat Loaf	Guilty Pleasure Tour
2012
2 February	Sharon Corr	Dream of You Tour
12 April	Reece Mastin	Live in New Zealand
5 November	The Black Keys	El Camino Tour
2013
21 February	Reece Mastin	Beautiful Nightmare Tour
17 November	OneRepublic	Native Tour
17 December	Leonard Cohen	Old Ideas World Tour
18 December	Leonard Cohen	Old Ideas World Tour
2014
20 March	Nine Inch Nails	Twenty Thirteen Tour
3 May	Arctic Monkeys	AM Tour
2015
18 February	Slash	World on Fire World Tour
10 April	Ed Sheeran	x Tour
18 April	Ricky Martin	One World Tour
2017
24 March	Twenty One Pilots	Emotional Roadshow World Tour
21 November	Take That	Wonderland Live
2018
23 May	Imagine Dragons	Evolve World Tour
2023
19 April	The 1975	At Their Very Best
29 November	Kraftwerk	Australasian tour
2024
21 November	Tate McRae	Think Later World Tour

== See also ==
- List of indoor arenas in New Zealand
