= Billy Yates (album) =

Studio album by Billy Yates
- Released: June 17, 1997
- Genre: Country
- Label: Almo Sounds
- Producer: Garth Fundis, Billy Yates

Billy Yates chronology
Billy Yates (1997)	If I Could Go Back (2001)

Billy Yates is the debut studio album by American country music singer Billy Yates. It was released on June 17, 1997, via Almo Sounds.

== Content ==
The album's lead single was "I Smell Smoke", but due to several radio stations playing the track "Flowers" instead, Almo Sounds withdrew "I Smell Smoke" and released "Flowers" instead. "Flowers" would peak at number 36 on the Billboard Hot Country Songs charts in mid-1997. "When the Walls Come Tumblin' Down" was the album's third and final single release.

George Jones covered "Choices" on his 1999 album Cold Hard Truth.

== Critical reception ==
Joel Bernstein of Country Standard Time was favorable toward Yates' voice and the production of Garth Fundis. He thought that some of the songs such as "Long Neck Connected to the Beer Joint" were "silly", but praised the lyrics of "Broken Hearted Me", "Mama Said", and "Easier Said Than Done" in particular. Bob Cannon of Entertainment Weekly rated the album "C+", calling "Flowers" "maudlin" and overall finding Yates' style imitative of Merle Haggard.

== Track listing ==
No.	Title	Writer(s)	Length
1.	"I Smell Smoke"	Billy Yates, Monty Criswell, Lee Thomas Miller	2:32
2.	"Would You Believe Me If I Lied"	Yates, Kostas	2:52
3.	"Choices"	Yates, Mike Curtis	4:07
4.	"Honky Tonk Baby"	Yates, Melba Montgomery	3:01
5.	"Mama Said"	Yates, Montgomery	2:59
6.	"Goodbye Makes the Saddest Sound"	Yates, Criswell, Heath Wright	3:17
7.	"When the Walls Come Tumblin' Down"	Yates, Criswell	2:36
8.	"Broken Hearted Me"	Yates, Monte Warden	3:27
9.	"Long Neck Connected to the Beer Joint"	Yates, Criswell, J. T. Blanton	2:20
10.	"Easier Said Than Done"	Yates, Montgomery	3:19
11.	"Flowers"	Yates, Criswell	2:59

== Charts ==
Chart performance for Billy Yates
Chart (1997)	Peak position
US Top Country Albums (Billboard)	56
