= I Don't Need Your Rockin' Chair =

Single by George Jones

from the album Walls Can Fall
- B-side: "Finally Friday"
- Released: 1992
- Length: 3:29
- Label: MCA Nashville
- Songwriters: Billy Yates, Frank Dycus, Kerry Kurt Phillips
- Producer: Emory Gordy, Jr.

George Jones singles chronology
"Honky Tonk Myself to Death" (1992)	"I Don't Need Your Rockin' Chair" (1992)	"Wrong's What I Do Best" (1993)

"I Don't Need Your Rockin' Chair" is a song written by Billy Yates, Frank Dycus and Kerry Kurt Phillips, and recorded by George Jones. It was the first single from his 1992 album Walls Can Fall.

== Background ==
Jones, who by 1992 had taken his place as one of the true legends of country music, used the composition as a personal statement, asserting his determination to carry on singing as he always had. Its final chorus is done as a call and response, with several other country singers providing the response: Vince Gill, Mark Chesnutt, Garth Brooks, Travis Tritt, Joe Diffie, Alan Jackson, Pam Tillis, T. Graham Brown, Patty Loveless and Clint Black. The song was praised by critics. In the book The Life and Times of a Honky Tonk Legend, Bob Allen describes it as a "boisterous musical declaration[…]about a man's determination to keep right on honky tonkin' into his golden years." Richard Carlin, in the book Country Music: A Biographical Dictionary, called it "a good-natured but defiant statement of where this old fella's comin' from." Brian Mansfield, in his review of Walls Can Fall, called the song "scarier because of George's past", while Jones himself described the song as "my attitude set to music." However, the single only rose to No. 34, and Jones remained frustrated at how many country radio stations had turned their backs on him. "There has never been a time when country radio was so disrespectful to its elders," he declared in his 1995 memoir. The song won the 1993 Country Music Association Award for Vocal Event of the Year.

== Chart performance ==
Chart (1992–93)	Peak position
Canada Country Singles (RPM)	63
US Hot Country Songs (Billboard)	34
