= Born to the Breed: A Tribute to Judy Collins =

Compilation album by Various artists
- Released: October 14, 2008 (US)
- Genre: Folk
- Label: Wildflower

Professional ratings
Review scores
| Source | Rating |
|---|---|
| AllMusic | 4.5/5 stars |

Born to the Breed: A Tribute to Judy Collins is a tribute compilation album to American folk singer Judy Collins, released on October 14, 2008 in the United States by the record label, Wildflower. A portion of the proceeds earned from album sales went to the Jazz Foundation of America.

The album developed from a discussion between Collins and Chrissie Hynde, longtime fans of each other. Collins recalled to an interviewer: "She told me she had a top-10 list of songs by other people that she wanted to record. One of them was one of my songs, 'My Father.' So I said, 'Well, why don't you do it? It would be great!'".

== Track listing ==
1. "Secret Gardens", performed by Shawn Colvin (4:33)
2. "Easy Times", performed by Jim Lauderdale (3:41)
3. "Fisherman Song", performed by Dolly Parton (3:29)
4. "Albatross", performed by Rufus Wainwright (5:14)
5. "Fortune of Soldiers", performed by The Webb Sisters (4:21)
6. "Song for Martin", performed by Kenny White (3:57)
7. "Since You've Asked", performed by Joan Baez (2:28)
8. "My Father", performed by Chrissie Hynde (3:36)
9. "Born to the Breed", performed by Amy Speace (4:34)
10. "Trust Your Heart", performed by Bernadette Peters (3:12)
11. "Fallow Way", performed by Jimmy Webb (5:13)
12. "Weaver Song (Holly's Song)", performed by Dar Williams (3:47)
13. "Song for Sarajevo", performed by Ali Eskandarian (5:00)
14. "Che", performed by James Mudriczki (7:24)
15. "Since You've Asked" (Dialogue), performed by Leonard Cohen (1:27)
