= Flowers (Billy Yates song) =

Single by Billy Yates

from the album Billy Yates
- Released: May 24, 1997
- Genre: Country
- Length: 2:59
- Label: Almo Sounds
- Songwriter(s): Billy Yates, Monty Criswell
- Producer(s): Billy Yates, Garth Fundis

Billy Yates singles chronology
"I Smell Smoke" (1997)	"Flowers" (1997)	"When the Walls Come Tumblin' Down" (1997)

"Flowers" is a song co-written and recorded by American country music singer Billy Yates. It was released in May 1997 as the second single from his self-titled debut album.

== Content ==
"Flowers" was the second single from Yates' self-titled debut album. The label had originally released "I Smell Smoke", but switched singles in mid-1997 due to demand from radio stations which had begun to play that song instead. Co-writer Monty Criswell came up with the song's central story line, about a man who expresses remorse towards his dead wife, whom he killed in an automobile accident caused by him driving under the influence. This sentiment is not expressed until the song's final verse, where Yates sings the lyric "Look what it took for me to finally bring you flowers."

== Critical reception ==
An uncredited review in Billboard was positive toward the song, calling it "unquestionably one of the most powerful ballads to emerge from the format since George Jones crooned 'He Stopped Loving Her Today'."

== Cover versions ==
Chris Young covered "Flowers" on his 2006 self-titled debut album.

== Chart performance ==
Chart (1997)	Peak position
US Hot Country Songs (Billboard)	36
