= The Webb Sisters =

English musical duo

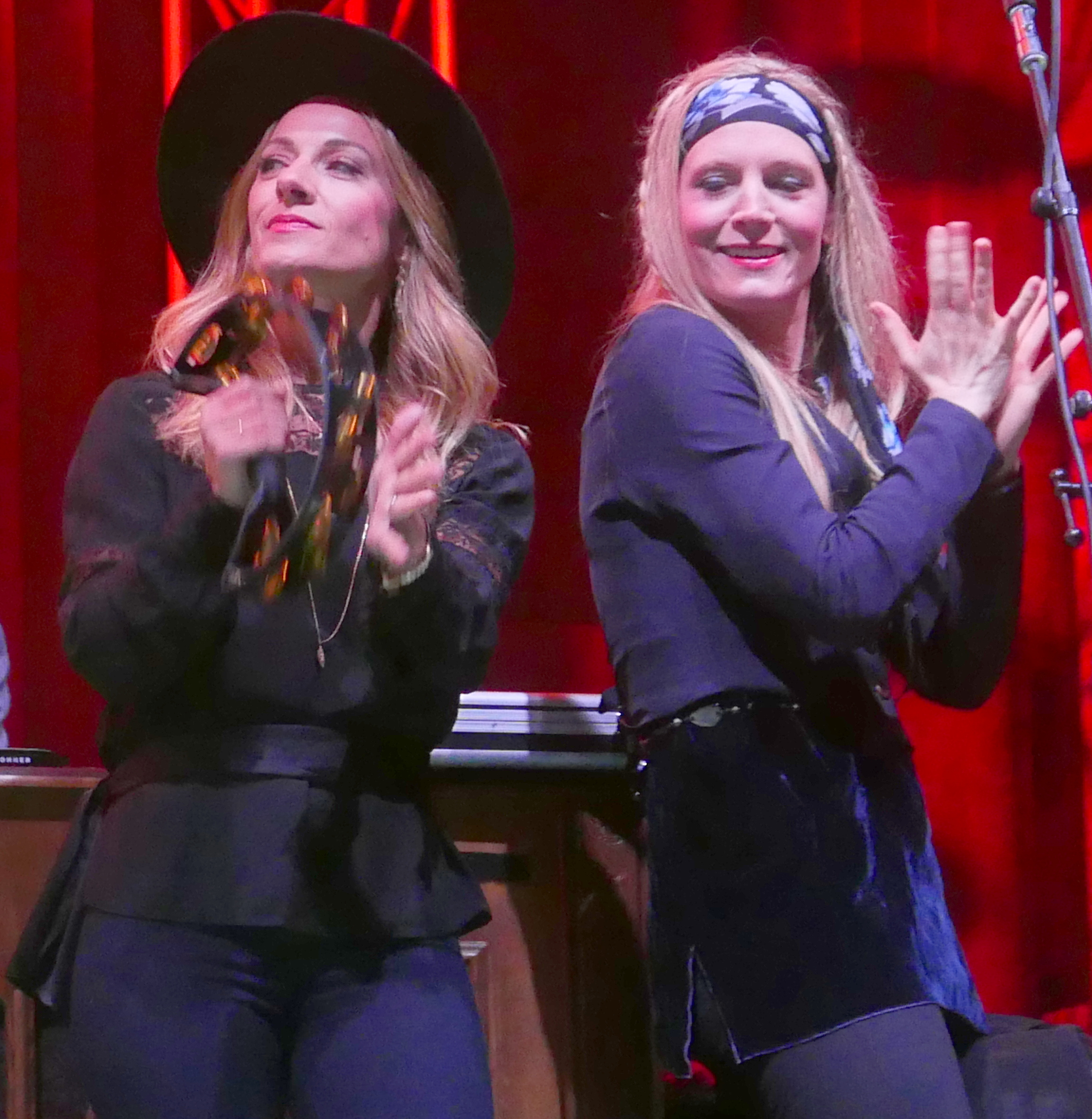
The Webb Sisters performing in 2017

The Webb Sisters are an English musical duo comprising the siblings Charley and Hattie Webb, from Kent. They were backing singers for Leonard Cohen from 2008 to 2014 and for Tom Petty in 2017. They also appear on Sting's album If on a Winter's Night..., released in 2009.

== Biography and history ==
Charley Webb and Hattie Webb were born in Kent, England, to an entrepreneur-drumming father and a tennis coach mother. They have two brothers who are both drummers. According to Charley, music often blared from all over the house. Hattie plays the harp and mandolin, and Charley the guitar, clarinet, and piano.

When they were teenagers, the pair began to give recitals all over the country, and played at, among others, charity functions and parties, and played twice for Princess Anne and once for Queen Elizabeth II.

They met Johnny Pierce, a record producer who invited them to Nashville, where they recorded their debut album, Piece of Mind. After six months, they went to California, selling the album at their gigs. They were soon discovered and were offered a publishing deal by Windswept Pacific Publishing, and, soon afterward, they signed a record deal with Universal Records.

Charley and Hattie collaborated with Jeff Trott (Sheryl Crow, Aimee Mann), Mike Elizondo (Dr. Dre, Fiona Apple), and Steve Booker (Duffy) on material that would become their album Daylight Crossing. Two years later they returned to the UK, where they worked with Universal Records sister company Mercury Records for the album's release. Daylight Crossing was produced by Steve Lipson and Youth, recorded at Sarm Hook End, Abbey Road and Olympic Studios. The album featured musicians Simon Tong and Simon Jones from the band The Verve and Steve Gadd and Pino Palladino. Daylight Crossing was released in June 2006 and became the 'Record of the Week' and 'Album of the Week' at BBC Radio 2, reaching No. 2 on UK's TV music video airplay chart. iTunes chose Daylight Crossing as 'Album of the Week' and singled out the song "Torches" as its 'Single of the Week' during its release week. The Webb Sisters performed on The Sharon Osbourne Show and toured in support of Jamie Cullum (for whom their brother Brad has played drums), Jason Mraz, James Morrison and Kubb, alongside band Leya and Joe Echo. Their song "Still The Only One" was played on the TV show Cane on CBS.

In May 2007, The Webb Sisters represented the UK at America's 400th Anniversary Celebrations in Jamestown, Virginia, which aired on NBC. They wrote a song with Sharon Robinson entitled "Pocahontas" that was first performed at the celebrations. At that time they collaborated with Angelo Petraglia (Kings of Leon) and Nashville's Craig Wiseman.

Charley and Hattie recorded the song "Fortune of Soldiers" for a Judy Collins tribute record alongside Chrissie Hynde, Dolly Parton, Shawn Colvin and Rufus Wainwright. The album Born to the Breed: A Tribute to Judy Collins was released on Wildflower Records in 2008.

In November 2008, The Webb Sisters released their EP Comes in Twos. It was released on iTunes in February 2009. The Webb Sisters were asked by Sting to sing on his album If on a Winter's Night…, released October 2010, including his single "Soul Cake". Their second EP, The Other Side, was released in January 2010 to coincide with a solo tour in USA and Canada, which included supporting Rufus Wainwright.

The band's album Savages was released on 9 May 2011 in UK and beyond. Savages was produced by multiple Grammy Award-winning producer Peter Asher. Savages was nominated for The 10th Annual Independent Music Awards in the Adult Contemporary category. They won the award for their song "Baroque Thoughts" in the same category.

The Webb Sisters released the EP When Will You Come Home? in 2013.

The Webb Sisters came to the attention of Pink Floyd's David Gilmour after their work with Leonard Cohen. They were invited to join him as backing singers (with some guitar, ukulele, and harp) for his 2024 Luck and Strange tour.

The sisters joined David Bowie alumni, Mike Garson, Earl Slick, Mark Plati, Gerry Leonard, Emm Gryner on Rob Flemming and James Sedge's KillerStar project, recording backing vox on the 2026 album The Afterglow.

== Working with Leonard Cohen ==
In April 2008, it was announced that The Webb Sisters had been chosen to join Leonard Cohen on his first tour in 15 years. The world tour started in Fredericton, New Brunswick, Canada, in May 2008 and concluded at The Colosseum at Caesars Palace in Las Vegas, Nevada, USA, in December 2010. 246 shows were played. Leonard Cohen Live in London was recorded in July 2008 at London's O2 Arena and released on 31 March 2009. Charley and Hattie were featured on the DVD on the song "If It Be Your Will".

=== 2008 ===
The Webb Sisters joined the band alongside Rafael Gayol, Javier Mas, Roscoe Beck, Sharon Robinson, Neil Larsen, Bob Metzger and Dino Soldo. The schedule of the first leg in summer 2008 encompassed Canada and Europe, including performances at The Big Chill, The Montreal Jazz Festival, and the Pyramid Stage at the 2008 Glastonbury Festival. While in Dublin, Leonard Cohen and his band were the first to play an open-air concert at IMMA Royal Hospital Kilmainham ground. In 2009, the performances were awarded with Ireland's Meteor Music Award as the best international live performance of the year. In September, October and November 2008, the tour travelled through Europe, including stops in Austria, Ireland, Poland, Romania, Italy, Germany, and Scandinavia.

=== 2009 ===
The third leg of Cohen's World Tour 2008–2009 encompassed New Zealand and Australia alongside artist Paul Kelly from 20 January to 10 February 2009. Simon Sweetman in The Dominion Post (Wellington) wrote "It is hard work having to put this concert in to words so I'll just say something I have never said in a review before and will never say again: this was the best show I have ever seen." Cohen played his first American concert in 15 years at the Beacon Theatre in New York City on 19 February 2009.

The North American Tour of 2009 opened on 1 April and included the performance at the Coachella Valley Music and Arts Festival on 17 April 2009.

On 1 July 2009, Cohen and his band started a European tour, the third in two years. The itinerary mostly included sport arenas and open-air summer festivals in Germany, UK, France, Spain, Ireland, but also performances in Serbia in the Belgrade Arena, in the Czech Republic, Hungary, Turkey, and again in Romania. On 3 August, Cohen gave an open-air show at the Piazza San Marco in Venice.

The last concert of this leg was held in Tel Aviv, Israel, on 24 September, three days after Cohen's 75th birthday, at Ramat Gan Stadium. The 47,000 tickets for the Tel Aviv concert, Cohen's first performance in Israel since 1980, sold out in less than 24 hours. The sixth leg of the 2008–2009 world tour went again to US, with 15 shows in October and November, with the "final" show in San Jose. The final leg included two new songs, "Feels So Good" and "The Darkness". But at that point, Cohen's "World Tour 2010" was already announced with the European dates in March.

On 14 September 2010, Sony Music released live CD-DVD album Songs from the Road, with the selection of 2008 and 2009 live performances.

=== 2010 ===
The tour started on 25 July 2010 in Arena Zagreb, Croatia. The tour continued through August, with stops in Austria, Belgium, Germany, Scandinavia, and Ireland, where on 31 July 2010 Cohen performed at Lissadell House in County Sligo. It was Cohen's eighth Irish concert in just two years after a hiatus of more than 20 years. On 12 August Cohen and his band played the 200th show of the tour, in Scandinavium, Gothenburg, Sweden, where he already played in October 2008; the show was four hours long.

The Fall leg of the European tour started in early September with an open-air show in Florence, Italy, and continued through Germany, Portugal, Spain, Switzerland, and Austria, where Cohen performed at the famous open-air opera stage of Römersteinbruch bei St. Margarethen im Burgenland, and then continued with dates in France, Poland, Russia (Moscow's State Kremlin Palace), Slovenia and Slovakia. In Slovenia's brand new Arena Stožice, Cohen accepted Croatia's Porin music award for best foreign live video programme, which he won for his Live in London DVD. Cohen's last European show was held in Sibamac Arena, in Bratislava, Slovakia.

The third leg of the 2010 tour started on 28 October, in New Zealand, and continued in Australia, including an open-air concert at the Hanging Rock. It was the first show ever organised at the site. The tour finished with seven special dates added in Vancouver, Portland, Victoria, and Oakland, with two final shows at Las Vegas' The Colosseum at Caesars Palace, on 10 and 11 December. The very last concert on 11 December was the 246th show Leonard, Rafael, Roscoe, Charley, Hattie, Sharon, Javier, Neil, Bob and Dino had played on the world tour, which had started on 11 May 2008.

=== 2012 ===
On 26 March 2012 Cohen announced the first concerts of his Old Ideas World Tour taking place in Europe from August to October 2012, and later in November and December in Canada and the US. The Webb Sisters were once again a part of the band. Similar to the last tour, they are featured on one song, "Coming Back to You", as well as "If It Be Your Will" in at least some encores. Charley and Hattie shared the vocals as well as instrumentation (harp and guitar). This tour continued in 2013.

=== 2014 ===
They were still working with Cohen, who released Popular Problems on 19 September, and Leonard Cohen: Live in Dublin on 2 December prior to his death in 2016.

== With Tom Petty ==
In 2017 the Webb sisters were part of Tom Petty and The Heartbreakers as backing singers on the band's 40th Anniversary World Tour.

== With David Gilmour ==
In 2024 the Webb sisters were backing singers including playing guitar and harp on the David Gilmour Luck and Strange World Tour and the David Gilmour Live at the Circus Maximus Rome film and DVD. On stage Gilmour refers to Leonard Cohen‘s description of “the sublime Webb sisters” They subsequently formed the Marshall Gilmour Webbs four piece vocal group with Gilmour's youngest daughter, Romany Gilmour.

== Discography ==
=== Albums ===
- Piece of Mind (2000) as Sisterswebb
- Daylight Crossing (2006) UPC 602517009745
- Savages (2011) (UK chart peak: #132) UPC 635961178125

=== EP ===
- "Comes in Twos" (2008) – 5-track EP featuring "If It Be Your Will" from Leonard Cohen's Live in London DVD
- "The Other Side" (2009) – 4-track EP
- "Always on My Mind" (2012) – 4-track EP, USA only
- "When Will You Come Home?" (2013) – 5-track EP

=== Singles ===
- "I Still Hear It" (2006) – "I Still Hear It", "Dead Old Leaves", "Do it All Over Again"
- "Still the Only One" (2006) – "Still the Only One", "My Way to You", "Last Night"

=== Contributions ===
- "Heroes & Thieves" (2007) – Vanessa Carlton
- Born to the Breed: A Tribute to Judy Collins (2008) – "Fortune of Soldiers"
- "White Man's Curse" (2009) – Paul Chesne
- "If on a Winter's Night..." (2009) – Sting
- "Leonard Cohen Live in London" DVD (2009) – Leonard Cohen
- "People in the Hole" (2010) – Catherine Feeny
- "Songs From The Road" (September 2010) – Leonard Cohen
- "God Only Knows" (2011) – Natalie Maines, produced by Rick Rubin
- "June in Siberia" (2011) – Mark Berube and the Patriotic Few
- "Esplendido Corazón" (2012) – Kevin Doherty (from the record 'Seeing Things')
- "Life" (2012) – The Avett Brothers (from the record 'The Carpenter')
- "Love Has Come For You" (2013) – Steve Martin and Edie Brickell
- "Live in Dublin" (2014) – Leonard Cohen
- ”Live at the Circus Maximum, Rome” (2025) - David Gilmour
- "The Afterglow" (2026) - KillerStar
