= Cold Hard Truth (album) =

Studio album by George Jones
- Released: June 22, 1999
- Genre: Country
- Length: 28:37
- Label: Asylum
- Producer: Keith Stegall

George Jones chronology
It Don't Get Any Better Than This (1998)	Cold Hard Truth (1999)	The Rock: Stone Cold Country 2001 (2001)

Cold Hard Truth is the 56th studio album by American country music singer George Jones. The album was released on June 22, 1999, on the Asylum label.

Vince Gill and Patty Loveless provide background vocals on the album's closing tracks "When The Last Curtain Falls". "You Never Know Just How Good You've Got It" was originally recorded by Tracy Byrd on his 1994 album No Ordinary Man.

== Reception ==
Professional ratings
Review scores
Source	Rating
Allmusic	4/5 stars

Cold Hard Truth reached number 5 on Billboard's country albums charts, the first Jones album to do so since Wine Colored Roses in 1986, and hit number 53 on the Billboard Top 200 chart. Country Weekly said of the album, "At age 67, George is singing better than ever, and proves here that there’s no substitute for experience. Cold Hard Truth is easily his most emotional and moving music in ages." AllMusic writes that the album "returns to the sound of his classic Mercury and UA recordings, meaning that there's nothing but honky tonk ballads and ravers throughout...In short, it's the album hardcore fans have said they've always wanted Jones to make." Don McLeese of Amazon.com agrees: "Though George Jones suffered a near-fatal collision while recording this album, Cold Hard Truth has the vocal command of an artist with a new lease of life." In a 2001 interview with Mark Binelli from Rolling Stone, Leonard Cohen asked, "Have you heard George Jones' last record Cold Hard Truth? I love to hear an old guy lay out his situation. He has the best voice in America."

== Track listing ==
No.	Title	Writer(s)	Length
1.	"Choices"	Billy Yates, Mike Curtis	3:26
2.	"The Cold Hard Truth"	Jamie O'Hara	4:08
3.	"Sinners & Saints"	J.B. Rudd, Vip Vipperman, Darryl Worley	2:29
4.	"Day After Forever"	Max D. Barnes	3:54
5.	"Ain't Love a Lot Like That"	Mark Collie, Dean Miller	2:20
6.	"Our Bed of Roses"	Keith Stegall, Zack Turner	4:12
7.	"Real Deal"	Jim Dowell, Keith Gattis	3:25
8.	"This Wanting You"	T. Graham Brown, Bruce Bouton, Bruce Burch	3:09
9.	"You Never Know Just How Good You've Got It"	Mark Nesler	3:29
10.	"When the Last Curtain Falls"	Emory Gordy, Jr., Jim Rushing	3:37

== Personnel ==
- Eddie Bayers – drums
- Stuart Duncan – fiddle
- Paul Franklin – steel guitar
- Vince Gill – background vocals
- Owen Hale – drums
- George Jones – acoustic guitar, lead vocals
- Patty Loveless – background vocals
- Larry Marrs – background vocals
- Brent Mason – electric guitar
- Hargus "Pig" Robbins – piano
- John Wesley Ryles – background vocals
- Bruce Watkins, Mark Casstevens – acoustic guitar
- Glenn Worf – bass guitar

== Charts ==
=== Weekly charts ===
Chart (1999)	Peak position
US Billboard 200	53
US Top Country Albums (Billboard)	5

=== Year-end charts ===
Chart (1999)	Position
US Top Country Albums (Billboard)	34
Chart (2000)	Position
US Top Country Albums (Billboard)	40

== Certifications ==
Region	Certification
United States (RIAA)	Gold
