= William H. Yates =

Abolitionist

William H. Yates (died September 18, 1868) was an African-American abolitionist, writer, and the President of the first Convention of Colored Men. He focused his writing in the form of articles and editorials in newspapers; along with responses about books and articles written on slavery or civil rights.

In contrast to common perception, Yates is not the author of Rights of Colored Men to Suffrage, Citizenship and Trial by Jury (1838), which addressed several topics that included the disenfranchisement of African Americans on the East Coast. The William Yates who produced the treatise was a white abolitionist with no known ties to William H. Yates.

== Early life and career ==
William H. Yates was born into slavery in Virginia to a free black man and an enslaved Native American woman, which gave the slave owner a claim on Yates. Yates was able to later purchase his freedom, after which point he moved to Washington D.C., where he worked as a porter in the Supreme Court. In this role he was able to make a living and earn a legal education, along with having practical application in a time period of slavery and turmoil. During his time in Washington D.C., Yates also kept a hackney stable and is thought to have helped fugitive slaves along the Underground Railroad. He then had to flee to New York due to accusations of aiding fugitives, but after his business failed, decided to move his family to San Francisco.

== Civil Rights activism ==
In San Francisco, Yates worked as a columnist to The Elevator and a contributor for The Pacific Appeal. As a contributor for The Pacific Appeal he critiqued William Wells Brown's The Black Man, particularly against Brown's assertion that Black Californians were not invested enough into the cause of African Americans and did not patronize black newspapers. Brown responded to the critique, spurring a debate that lasted over several issues of The Pacific Appeal.

Yates was viewed as a prominent elder in the African-American community with intimate knowledge of how Congress worked, which prompted his appointment as the President of the convention for the first Convention of Colored Men, held in San Francisco in 1855. In the Congressional proceedings he stated:

"I desire that members not enter into lengthy... discussions upon every question regarding which there may be a difference of opinion, but confine themselves strictly to the legitimate business of the meeting, so that the convention maybe enabled to close its proceedings today, and do so in a manner as to reflect credit upon ourselves and the cause we advocate."

In 1862, he was able to finally see success when the State of California repealed the laws preventing black men from having legal, judicial, and economic rights.

William Yates died around September 18, 1868. He was approximately 51–55 years old upon his death. His service was held on Bethel Church in Powell Street.
