= Billy Yates (singer) =

American singer-songwriter

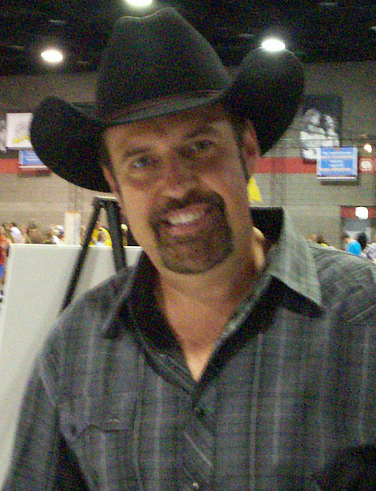
- Billy Yates at CMA Music Festival, June 2010

Background information
- Born: Billy Wayne Yates; March 13, 1963 (age 63)
- Origin: Doniphan, Missouri, U.S.
- Genres: Country
- Occupation: Singer-songwriter
- Instrument: Vocals
- Years active: 1992–present
- Labels: Curb; Almo Sounds; Columbia; M.O.D.
- Website: www.billyyates.com

Billy Wayne Yates (born March 13, 1963) is an American country music artist. He has released ten studio albums and has charted four singles on the Billboard country charts, including "Flowers" which reached number 36 in 1997. Yates also co-wrote George Jones' singles "I Don't Need Your Rockin' Chair" and "Choices", which were released in 1993 and 1999 respectively. Other artists who have recorded Yates' work include Ricochet, Ricky Van Shelton, and Kenny Chesney. In addition to his work as a singer and songwriter, Yates is the owner of the songwriting and publishing company Smokin' Grapes, which was founded in 2006. Yates' musical style is defined by neotraditional country and honky-tonk influences, and has been favorably compared to artists such as Gene Watson.

== Biography ==
=== 1963–1992: Early life ===
Billy Wayne Yates was born on March 13, 1963, in Doniphan, Missouri. He was raised on his family's farm, where he took inspiration from the various country music artists to which his family listened, such as Jim Reeves and Ernest Tubb. His father was a barber and would often pay his son to shine customers' shoes at his barber shop. Yates and his father would also sing every Sunday on a local radio show hosted by the town's radio station, KDFN. He did not otherwise perform publicly until he gave an impromptu performance of "Crying My Heart Out Over You" at a local show in Wappapello, Missouri, as a teen. He continued to perform at this show for three years until his father encouraged him to also get a barber's license. After doing so, Yates began working at a barber in Doniphan during the daytime while also working as a nighttime disc jockey at KDFN.

=== 1993–1999: "I Don't Need Your Rockin' Chair" and Billy Yates ===
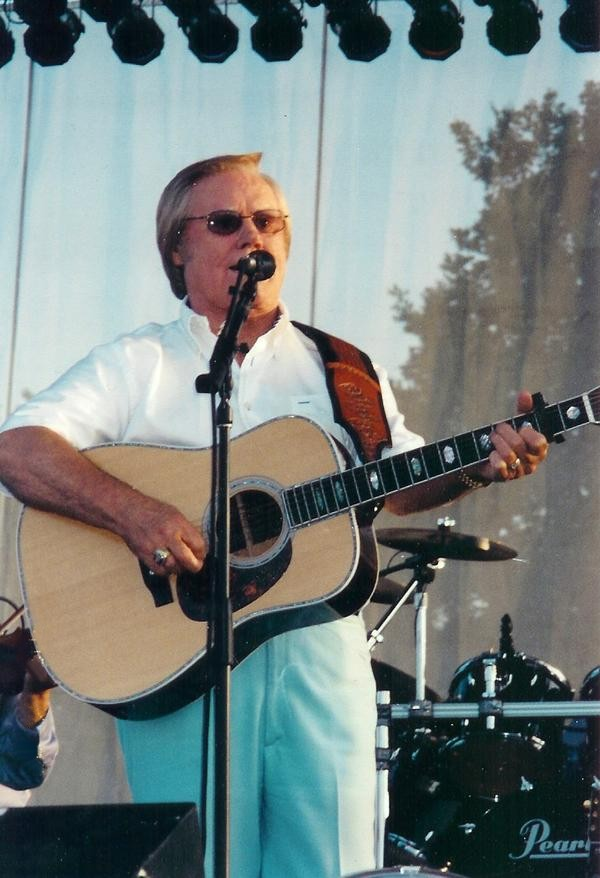
George Jones recorded Yates' compositions "I Don't Need Your Rockin' Chair" and "Choices".

Yates traveled between Missouri and Nashville, Tennessee, several times in pursuit of a music career. He found brief work as a demo singer in 1982, but felt at the time that he was unprepared. At this time, Yates supported himself financially by continuing to work as a barber. Upon returning to Nashville in the early 1990s, he got his first songwriter publishing contract with Hori Pro Entertainment, which led to George Jones recording two of his songs for his 1992 album Walls Can Fall. "I Don't Need Your Rockin' Chair", one of the two songs recorded by Jones, was released as a single that year and was nominated for a Grammy Award. The success of the Jones cuts led to Yates signing with Curb Records in 1993. He released one single titled "Turn for the Worse", which was also recorded by Dude Mowrey that same year. In addition, Kenny Chesney would later cover the song on his 1996 album Me and You. Yates also co-wrote the title track of Ricky Van Shelton's 1993 album A Bridge I Didn't Burn.

Yates left Curb after only the one single; he would later tell the blog Country Music News International that "nothing came" of its release. Despite this, he continued to write songs, record demos, and perform at songwriter showcases throughout Nashville. Among his successes as a songwriter was "From Good to Bad to Worse to Gone", a cut from Ricochet's self-titled debut album in 1996. In 1997, record producer Garth Fundis heard Yates perform at a Nashville club and chose to sign him to Almo Sounds, an independent label whose Nashville division he was president of at the time. The label released his debut album Billy Yates that same year; Yates co-wrote every song and co-produced with Fundis. "I Smell Smoke" was initially selected as the lead single, but due to a large number of stations playing "Flowers", the label began officially promoting that song as a single in May 1997. "Flowers" went on to reach number 36 on the Billboard Hot Country Songs charts in 1997. The song came about when co-writer Monty Criswell presented the idea to Yates during a songwriting session. It is about a man who expresses remorse after his wife dies in an automobile crash caused by him driving under the influence. Yates described the song as "special" and said that he was willing to record a song that "strikes a nerve". "Flowers" also received a music video, which was nominated by Billboard at their 1997 Music Video Awards in the category of Best New Country Artist. Writing for Country Standard Time, Joel Bernstein praised Yates' voice and Fundis' production, but thought that the album's ballads were better written than the up-tempo songs. Bob Cannon of Entertainment Weekly rated the album "C+", describing the song "Flowers" as "maudlin" and overall finding Yates' style imitative of Merle Haggard.

Yates would chart only one more single for Almo Sounds, "When the Walls Come Tumblin' Down", before the label closed its Nashville division later in 1997. Despite this, Jones covered another one of Yates's songs, "Choices", on his 1999 album Cold Hard Truth. According to Yates, he had written the song in 1994 with the intent of having Alan Jackson record it; when Jackson did not record it, Yates recommended it to Jones, who turned it down twice before deciding to record it. The song was a top-30 country hit for Jones and won him the Grammy Award for Best Male Country Vocal Performance in 1999.

=== 2000–present: Columbia Records and independent ===
In 2000, Yates signed with Columbia Records Nashville and charted one single, "What Do You Want from Me Now". It was his only released for the label before he left it in October 2001. Yates told Country Standard Time in 2003 that he chose to leave Columbia because he felt that label executives considered his style too neotraditional country in nature to be successful. Todd Sterling of AllMusic stated that Yates chose to leave Columbia due to a desire to record a more traditional sounding album, and that label executives agreed to release him from his contract after realizing that he did not wish to sign with a rival label.

After exiting Columbia, Yates founded his own label called M.O.D., an abbreviation for "my own damn records". His first release on his own label was If I Could Go Back in 2001. The album's lead single was "Too Country and Proud of It". Bobby Peacock of Roughstock reviewed the album favorably, with a focus on Yates' singing voice and lyrics in particular. His next independent album was 2003's Country. According to an interview with Country Standard Time, the idea for the album's title track came to Yates in a dream. Another song on the album was "Smokin' Grass", which Yates co-wrote with Shannon Lawson. Lawson would later record the song himself and chart his version on Hot Country Songs in 2004. Two more independent albums, Anywhere but Nashville and Harmony Man, followed in 2004 and 2005 respectively. Peacock reviewed Anwyhere but Nashville favorably for Roughstock, stating that "By releasing his music entirely on his own, Yates found ways to improve on the fine neotraditionalist sound he'd already built up on his underrated debut." Brian Wahlert of Country Standard Time reviewed the same project positively, stating that it contained "traditional country songs that display keen insight into everyday trials and joys, with a healthy dose of fun mixed in." In 2006, Chris Young covered "Flowers" on his self-titled debut album. Also in 2006, Yates founded the songwriting and publishing company Smokin' Grapes. One of the writers employed by his publishing company is Wil Nance, whose credits include the George Strait album cut "If Heartaches Were Horses". Yates himself would have other songwriting credits through Smokin' Grapes, including album cuts by Joe Nichols and Sara Evans.

Yates' next album was 2008's That's Why I Run. Todd Sterling of AllMusic wrote of this album that "Yates may be considered by some to be too country, but to his faithful fans, he's perfect just the way he is." Two more discs came in 2009. First was a compilation called Favorites, which included tracks from his previous albums, as well as a re-recording of "Choices" as a duet with Jones. The other was Bill's Barber Shop, the title track of which references the barber shop that Yates used to run. Also included on the album was a duet with Nicole Broussard on "I'll Do It for You". Ben Foster of Roughstock thought that the album had too many novelty songs, but otherwise praised Yates' lyricism and singing voice. Yates toured several countries in Europe, including Switzerland and Lithuania, to support this album. According to Yates, his music gained popularity on that continent thanks to fans discovering and downloading it via the Internet. He continued to tour Europe in 2011 in support of his next album, Just Be You. Unlike his previous albums, Yates wrote every song by himself. "On My Way (The Norway Song)" was the album's lead single. His last independent album was 2015's These Old Walls, which like its predecessors was supported through extensive touring in Europe.

== Musical styles ==
In an interview with Country Music News International, Yates cited Keith Whitley, Webb Pierce, Lefty Frizzell, and Buck Owens among his main musical influences. He also stated that he preferred to record on his own label instead of on a major label, because of the amount of control he is able to maintain over his own music in terms of songwriting and production. With regards to his songwriting style, Yates cites Harlan Howard as an influence as well. Brian Wahlert of Country Standard Time and Bobby Peacock of Roughstock both compared Yates' voice favorably to that of Gene Watson. Writing for AllMusic, Todd Sterling called Yates' singing and songwriting style "traditional", stating that his songs were "real people singing about real things". He also noted the frequent use of fiddle, acoustic guitar, and steel guitar in Yates' production.

== Personal life ==
Billy Yates has been married to his wife, Nancy, since the release of "Flowers" in 1997. They have one son named Grayson, who was ten years old when he provided guest vocals on Just Be You. In 2015, Yates had a section of U.S. Highway 160 outside his hometown of Doniphan named after him. State senator Mike Cunningham attended the naming ceremony, which also included musical performances by Jimmy Fortune and Buddy Jewell.

== Discography ==
=== Albums ===
List of Billy Yates' albums, including release dates and chart positions
Title	Album details	Peak positions
Title	Album details	US Country
Billy Yates	Release date: June 17, 1997; Label: Almo Sounds	56
If I Could Go Back	Release date: 2001; Label: M.O.D.	—
Country	Release date: 2003; Label: M.O.D.	—
Anywhere but Nashville	Release date: 2004; Label: M.O.D.	—
Harmony Man	Release date: May 24, 2005; Label: M.O.D.	—
Favorites	Release date: December 5, 2006; Label: M.O.D.	—
That's Why I Run	Release date: March 4, 2008; Label: M.O.D.	—
Bill's Barber Shop	Release date: December 2009; Label: M.O.D.	—
Just Be You	Release date: June 2011; Label: M.O.D.	—
These Old Walls	Release date: January 13, 2015; Label: Self-released	—
"—" denotes releases that did not chart

=== Singles ===
List of Billy Yates' singles, including release dates and chart positions
Year	Single	Peak positions	Album
Year	Single	US Country	Album
1993	"Turn for the Worse"	—	—N/a
1997	"I Smell Smoke"	69	Billy Yates
1997	"Flowers"	36	Billy Yates
1997	"When the Walls Come Tumblin' Down"	69	Billy Yates
2000	"What Do You Want from Me Now"	53	—N/a
2001	"Too Country and Proud of It"	—	If I Could Go Back
2006	"God Bless the Children" (with Wayne Warner and the Nashville All-Star Choir)	—	Turbo Twang'n
2011	"On My Way (The Norway Song)"	—	Just Be You
"—" denotes releases that did not chart

=== Music videos ===
List of Billy Yates' music videos, including release dates and director
Year	Video	Director
1997	"I Smell Smoke"	—N/a
1997	"Flowers"	—N/a
2000	"What Do You Want from Me Now"	David McClister
2011	"On My Way"	—N/a
2013	"My Infinite Love"	Michael Bracken
