= Choices (Billy Yates song) =

Single by George Jones

from the album Cold Hard Truth
- Released: May 8, 1999
- Genre: Country
- Length: 3:23
- Label: Asylum
- Songwriter: Mike Curtis; Billy Yates
- Producer: Keith Stegall

George Jones singles chronology
"You Don't Seem to Miss Me" (1997)	"Choices" (1999)	"The Cold Hard Truth" (1999)

"Choices" is a song written by American country music singer Billy Yates and Mike Curtis, first recorded by Yates on his 1997 self-titled album for Almo Sounds. It was later covered by George Jones, who released as the first single from his album The Cold Hard Truth on May 8, 1999, and it peaked at number 30 on the Billboard country charts. There is speculation that Yates drew inspiration for the song from his time working at a business or firm, where he often had to make choices.

== George Jones version ==
After recording five studio albums for MCA Nashville between 1991 and 1998, Jones signed with Asylum and released the single "Choices." The music video, which features photographs of the singer throughout his life, had a more gripping resonance in light of Jones's March 1999 drunk driving incident with lines like, "Now I'm living and dying with the choices I've made." Radio stations began receiving calls to hear it and the song eventually reached the Top 30 and won Jones the Grammy for Best Male Country Vocal Performance.

The song was at the center of controversy when the Country Music Association (CMA) invited Jones to perform it on the 1999 CMA Awards show, but required that he perform an abridged version. Jones refused and did not attend the show. Alan Jackson was angry with the association's decision, and halfway through his performance of "Pop a Top" during the show, he signaled to his band and played the chorus of Jones' song in protest, before angrily exiting the stage to a long standing ovation. The performance has since been cited as one of the best and most memorable moments in CMA history.

Canadian singer Leonard Cohen, a George Jones fan, released a version of the song on the 2015 LP Can't Forget. The day Jones died in 2013, Cohen performed "Choices" on stage in Winnipeg, Manitoba, Canada, as a tribute to the country legend.

== Chart performance ==
Chart (1999)	Peak position
Canada Country Singles (RPM)	30
US Hot Country Songs (Billboard)	30
