= The Very Best of Elvis Costello and The Attractions 1977–86 =

Greatest hits album by Elvis Costello and the Attractions
- Released: 25 October 1994
- Recorded: 1977–1986
- Genres: New wave, punk rock, alternative rock
- Length: 77:07
- Labels: Rykodisc, Demon
- Producers: Nick Lowe, Billy Sherrill, Geoff Emerick, Clive Langer, Alan Winstanley, T-Bone Burnett, Declan MacManus & Colin Fairley

Elvis Costello and the Attractions chronology
Brutal Youth (1994)	The Very Best of Elvis Costello and The Attractions 1977–86 (1994)	Kojak Variety (1995)

Professional ratings
Review scores
Source	Rating
AllMusic	4.5/5 stars
The Encyclopedia of Popular Music	4/5 stars

The Very Best of Elvis Costello and The Attractions 1977–86 is a compilation album by Elvis Costello and the Attractions, released in 1994 as part of the Rykodisc reissue series.

== Track listing ==
All tracks are written by Elvis Costello except as noted.

No.	Title	Writer(s)	Original Album	Length
1.	"Alison"		My Aim Is True	3:21
2.	"Watching the Detectives"		single, 1978	3:45
3.	"(I Don't Want to Go to) Chelsea"		This Year's Model	3:07
4.	"Pump It Up"		This Year's Model	3:14
5.	"Radio Radio"		single, 1978	3:05
6.	"(What's So Funny 'Bout) Peace, Love and Understanding"	Nick Lowe	single, 1979	3:31
7.	"Oliver's Army"		Armed Forces	2:58
8.	"Accidents Will Happen"		Armed Forces	3:00
9.	"I Can't Stand Up For Falling Down"	Homer Banks, Allen Jones	Get Happy!!	2:05
10.	"New Amsterdam"		Get Happy!!	2:11
11.	"High Fidelity"		Get Happy!!	2:26
12.	"Clubland"		Trust	3:42
13.	"Watch Your Step"		Trust	2:57
14.	"Good Year for the Roses"	Jerry Chesnut	Almost Blue	3:07
15.	"Beyond Belief"		Imperial Bedroom	2:33
16.	"Man Out of Time"		Imperial Bedroom	5:26
17.	"Everyday I Write the Book"		Punch the Clock	3:53
18.	"Shipbuilding"	Costello & Clive Langer	Punch the Clock	4:51
19.	"Love Field"		Goodbye Cruel World	3:26
20.	"Brilliant Mistake"		King of America	3:42
21.	"Indoor Fireworks"		King of America	4:07
22.	"I Want You"		Blood and Chocolate	6:40
Total length:				77:07

== Charts ==
Chart performance for The Very Best of Elvis Costello
Chart (1994)	Peak position
Australian Albums (ARIA)	124
