= The Very Best of Elvis Costello =

Greatest hits album by Elvis Costello
- Released: 2 August 1999
- Recorded: 1977–1998
- Genres: New wave, punk rock, pub rock, power pop, pop rock
- Length: 154:07
- Label: Polygram
- Producers: Elvis Costello, Burt Bacharach, T-Bone Burnett, Geoff Emerick, Larry Kalman Hirsch, Trevor Jones, Kevin Killen, Clive Langer, Nick Lowe, Billy Sherrill, Alan Winstanley

Elvis Costello chronology
Painted from Memory (1998)	The Very Best of Elvis Costello (1999)	The Sweetest Punch (1999)

Professional ratings
Review scores
Source	Rating
Allmusic	4.5/5 stars

The Very Best of Elvis Costello is a compilation album by English musician Elvis Costello, first released on 2 August 1999 through Polygram Records. The album spanned his recorded work from 1977 through 1998. It was re-released less than two years later on Rhino Records as the first entry in their comprehensive Costello reissue series.

== Track listing ==
All tracks are written by Elvis Costello unless otherwise indicated.

Disc One
No.	Title	Writer(s)	Original Album	Length
1.	"(What's So Funny 'Bout) Peace, Love, and Understanding" (with The Attractions)	Nick Lowe	single, 1978	3:31
2.	"Oliver's Army" (with the Attractions)		Armed Forces	2:57
3.	"Watching the Detectives"		single, 1977	3:43
4.	"Alison"		My Aim Is True	3:21
5.	"(I Don't Want to Go to) Chelsea" (with the Attractions)		This Year's Model	3:07
6.	"Accidents Will Happen" (with the Attractions)		Armed Forces	3:01
7.	"Pump It Up" (with the Attractions)		This Year's Model	3:13
8.	"I Can't Stand Up for Falling Down" (with the Attractions)	Homer Banks, Allen Jones	Get Happy!!	2:05
9.	"Radio Radio" (with the Attractions)		single, 1978	3:06
10.	"Clubland" (with the Attractions)		Trust	3:43
11.	"A Good Year for the Roses"	Jerry Chesnut	Almost Blue	3:35
12.	"Man Out of Time" (with the Attractions)		Imperial Bedroom	5:25
13.	"I Wanna Be Loved" (with the Attractions)	Farnell Jenkins	Goodbye Cruel World	4:46
14.	"Everyday I Write the Book" (with the Attractions)		Punch the Clock	3:52
15.	"Brilliant Mistake" (The Costello Show Featuring His Confederates)		King of America	3:41
16.	"The Other Side of Summer"		Mighty Like a Rose	3:53
17.	"Tokyo Storm Warning" (with the Attractions)		Blood and Chocolate	6:23
18.	"Sulky Girl" (with the Attractions)		Brutal Youth	5:04
19.	"So Like Candy"	MacManus, Paul McCartney	Mighty Like a Rose	4:35
20.	"Veronica"	MacManus, McCartney	Spike	3:07
21.	"She"	Charles Aznavour, Herbert Kretzmer	Soundtrack to Notting Hill	3:05

Disc Two
No.	Title	Writer(s)	Original Album	Length
22.	"Big Tears" (with the Attractions)		B-side of "Pump It Up" single, 1978	3:10
23.	"Beyond Belief" (with the Attractions)		Imperial Bedroom	2:33
24.	"Lipstick Vogue" (with the Attractions)		This Year's Model	3:31
25.	"Green Shirt" (with the Attractions)		Armed Forces	2:44
26.	"Pills and Soap"		Punch the Clock	3:43
27.	"Tramp the Dirt Down"		Spike	5:41
28.	"Shipbuilding" (with the Attractions)	MacManus, Clive Langer	Punch the Clock	4:51
29.	"High Fidelity" (with the Attractions)		Get Happy!!	2:28
30.	"New Lace Sleeves" (with the Attractions)		Trust	3:47
31.	"(The Angels Wanna Wear My) Red Shoes"		My Aim Is True	2:46
32.	"Talking in the Dark" (with the Attractions)		single, 1978	1:57
33.	"New Amsterdam"		Get Happy!!	2:13
34.	"I Hope You're Happy Now" (with the Attractions)		Blood and Chocolate	3:07
35.	"Riot Act" (with the Attractions)		Get Happy!!	3:34
36.	"My Funny Valentine"	Lorenz Hart, Richard Rodgers	B-side of "Oliver's Army" single, 1979	1:29
37.	"Indoor Fireworks" (The Costello Show Featuring His Confederates)		King of America	4:09
38.	"Almost Blue" (with the Attractions)		Imperial Bedroom	2:49
39.	"I Want You" (with the Attractions)		Blood and Chocolate	6:43
40.	"God Give Me Strength" (with Burt Bacharach)	Bacharach, MacManus	Painted from Memory	6:10
41.	"That Day Is Done" (The Fairfield Four Featuring Elvis Costello)	MacManus, McCartney	I Couldn't Hear Nobody Pray	5:10
42.	"I Want to Vanish" (with Steve Nieve & The Brodsky Quartet)		All This Useless Beauty	3:14
Total length:				154:07

== Charts ==
=== Weekly charts ===
Chart (1999)	Peak position
Australian Albums (ARIA)	168
Belgian Albums (Ultratop Flanders)	48
Dutch Albums (Album Top 100)	11
Scottish Albums (Official Charts)	11
UK Albums (Official Charts)	4

=== Year-end charts ===
Chart (1999)	Position
Dutch Albums (Album Top 100)	99
UK Albums (OCC)	99
