= Girls Girls Girls (Elvis Costello album) =

Compilation album by Elvis Costello and The Attractions
- Released: 1989
- Recorded: 1977–86
- Genre: New wave
- Length: 153:04 (CD)
- Label: Demon
- Producer: Nick Lowe, Geoff Emerick, Roger Bechirian, Clive Langer, Alan Winstanley

Elvis Costello and The Attractions chronology
Blood and Chocolate (1986)	Girls Girls Girls (1989)	Spike (1989)

Girls Girls Girls is a 1989 compilation album collecting various previously released songs by British singer/songwriter Elvis Costello from 1977–86. Costello chose and ordered the tracks on the album himself, and accompanied them with extensive liner notes. The title of the album is sometimes rendered as Girls! Girls! Girls! or Girls +£÷ Girls =$& Girls (using typography from the album cover).

Professional ratings
Review scores
Source	Rating
Allmusic	link

== Track listing ==
The compilation focuses on original material written (or co-written) by Costello, and therefore omits such well-known Costello performances such as "(What's So Funny 'Bout) Peace, Love and Understanding", "I Can't Stand Up For Falling Down" or "Good Year for the Roses", all of which were cover songs. As personally selected by Costello as a "best-of" compilation (rather than a "greatest hits" collection), it also omits some significant Costello-penned chart singles, including his only US charted singles to that time ("Everyday I Write The Book" and "The Only Flame In Town") and the UK #29 hit "Radio, Radio".

Note as well that there are significant differences amongst the CD, LP, cassette(MC) and DAT editions of the album, with each format featuring a different selection of tracks.

The table below indicates the full range of tracks, and which format each track appears on. There are 64 tracks which appear on various editions of the compilation. 26 tracks appear across all formats, while the remainder are scattered throughout the various formats, i.e., some of these tracks appear exclusively on only one format, while others are featured on two or three. The individual formats (LP, CD, MC, DAT) are discussed immediately following the table.

Track	Format			
Track	CD ♠	LP ♣	MC ♥	DAT ♦
"Watching the Detectives"	♠	♣	♥	♦
"I Hope You're Happy Now"	♠	♣	♥	♦
"This Year's Girl"	♠		♥	
"Lover's Walk"	♠	♣	♥	♦
"Pump It Up"	♠	♣	♥	♦
"Strict Time"	♠		♥	
"Temptation"	♠	♣	♥	♦
"(I Don't Want to Go to) Chelsea"	♠	♣	♥	♦
"High Fidelity"	♠	♣	♥	♦
"Honey, Are You Straight or Are You Blind?"			♥	
"Lovable"	♠	♣	♥	♦
"Girls Talk"			♥	
"Mystery Dance"	♠		♥	
"Big Tears"	♠		♥	
"Uncomplicated"	♠			
"Lipstick Vogue"	♠	♣	♥	♦
"Poor Napoleon"			♥	
"Man Out of Time"	♠	♣	♥	♦
"Brilliant Mistake"	♠	♣	♥	♦
"New Lace Sleeves"	♠	♣	♥	♦
"Accidents Will Happen"	♠		♥	♦
"Home Is Anywhere You Hang Your Head"			♥	
"Beyond Belief"	♠	♣	♥	♦
"Black and White World"	♠			
"Green Shirt"	♠	♣	♥	♦
"Turning the Town Red"			♥	
"The Loved Ones"	♠		♥	
"New Amsterdam"	♠		♥	
"(The Angels Wanna Wear My) Red Shoes"	♠	♣	♥	♦
"King Horse"	♠	♣	♥	♦
"Big Sister's Clothes"	♠			
"Sleep of the Just"			♥	
"Alison"	♠	♣	♥	♦
"Man Called Uncle"	♠		♥	
"Party Girl"	♠	♣		♦
"Shabby Doll"	♠		♥	
"Our Little Angel"			♥	
"The Long Honeymoon"			♥	
"Motel Matches"	♠			
"Tiny Steps"	♠			
"Almost Blue"	♠	♣	♥	♦
"Riot Act"	♠	♣	♥	♦
"Crimes of Paris"			♥	
"Love Field"	♠			
"Possession"	♠			
"Poisoned Rose"	♠	♣	♥	♦
"Indoor Fireworks"	♠	♣		♦
"I Want You"	♠	♣	♥	♦
"I'll Wear It Proudly"		♣		♦
"Jack of All Parades"			♥	
"Oliver's Army"	♠	♣	♥	♦
"Little Palaces"			♥	
"Pills and Soap"	♠	♣	♥	♦
"Night Rally"			♥	
"American Without Tears"			♥	
"Stranger in the House"		♣		♦
"Sunday's Best"	♠			
"Watch Your Step"	♠		♥	
"Suit of Lights"			♥	
"Less Than Zero"	♠			
"Clubland"	♠	♣	♥	♦
"Tokyo Storm Warning"	♠	♣	♥	♦
"Shipbuilding"	♠	♣	♥	♦
"Clowntime Is Over"			♥	

=== CD version ===
The CD version of Girls Girls Girls features 47 tracks. Nine of the tracks (marked ♠) are exclusive to the CD configuration of this compilation, and do not appear on the LP, cassette (MC), or DAT version of the album.

==== Disc one ====
1. "Watching the Detectives"
2. "I Hope You're Happy Now"
3. "This Year's Girl"
4. "Lover's Walk"
5. "Pump It Up"
6. "Strict Time"
7. "Temptation"
8. "(I Don't Want to Go to) Chelsea"
9. "High Fidelity"
10. "Lovable"
11. "Mystery Dance"
12. "Big Tears"
13. "Uncomplicated"♠
14. "Lipstick Vogue"
15. "Man Out of Time"
16. "Brilliant Mistake"
17. "New Lace Sleeves"
18. "Accidents Will Happen"
19. "Beyond Belief"
20. "Black and White World"♠
21. "Green Shirt"
22. "The Loved Ones"
23. "New Amsterdam"
24. "(The Angels Wanna Wear My) Red Shoes"
25. "King Horse"
26. "Big Sister's Clothes"♠

==== Disc two ====
1. "Alison"
2. "Man Called Uncle"
3. "Party Girl"
4. "Shabby Doll"
5. "Motel Matches"♠
6. "Tiny Steps"♠
7. "Almost Blue"
8. "Riot Act"
9. "Love Field"♠
10. "Possession"♠
11. "Poisoned Rose"
12. "Indoor Fireworks"
13. "I Want You" (Single version)
14. "Oliver's Army"
15. "Pills and Soap"
16. "Sunday's Best"♠
17. "Watch Your Step"
18. "Less Than Zero"♠
19. "Clubland"
20. "Tokyo Storm Warning"
21. "Shipbuilding"

=== LP/DAT version ===
The LP version features 30 tracks, the DAT 31. The two are very similar in terms of programming, with the extra track on the DAT being "Accidents Will Happen" (a track which also appears on both the CD and cassette). Two of the tracks (marked ♣/♦) are exclusive to the LP/DAT configurations of this compilation, and do not appear on the cassette or CD.

==== Record one: Side one ====
1. "Watching the Detectives"
2. "I Hope You're Happy Now"
3. "Pump It Up"
4. "Lover's Walk"
5. "Temptation"
6. "Lovable"
7. "(I Don't Want to Go to) Chelsea"
8. "High Fidelity"
9. "Lipstick Vogue"

==== Record one: Side two ====
1. "Man Out of Time"
2. "Brilliant Mistake"
3. "New Lace Sleeves"
4. "King Horse"
5. "Green Shirt"
6. "(The Angels Wanna Wear My) Red Shoes"
7. "Beyond Belief"

==== Record two: Side one ====
1. "Alison"
2. "Indoor Fireworks"
3. "Party Girl"
4. "Almost Blue"
5. "Riot Act"
6. "Poisoned Rose"
7. "I Want You" (Single version)
8. "I'll Wear It Proudly"♣/♦

==== Record two: Side two ====
1. "Oliver's Army"
2. "Pills and Soap"
3. "Stranger in the House"♣/♦
4. "Clubland"
5. "Tokyo Storm Warning"
6. "Shipbuilding"

=== Cassette (MC) version ===
The cassette version features 51 tracks. Fifteen of the tracks (marked ♥) are exclusive to the cassette configuration of this compilation, and do not appear on either the LP, DAT or CD version of the album.

==== Tape one: Side one ====
1. "Watching the Detectives"
2. "I Hope You're Happy Now"
3. "This Year's Girl"
4. "Strict Time"
5. "Pump It Up"
6. "Lover's Walk"
7. "Temptation"
8. "Honey, Are You Straight or Are You Blind?"♥
9. "Lovable"
10. "Girls Talk"♥
11. "Mystery Dance"
12. "(I Don't Want to Go to) Chelsea"
13. "High Fidelity"
14. "Big Tears"
15. "Lipstick Vogue"
16. "Poor Napoleon"♥

==== Tape one: Side two ====
1. "Man Out of Time"
2. "Brilliant Mistake"
3. "New Lace Sleeves"
4. "Accidents Will Happen"
5. "Home Is Anywhere You Hang Your Head"♥
6. "The Loved Ones"
7. "King Horse"
8. "Green Shirt"
9. "Turning the Town Red"♥
10. "New Amsterdam"
11. "(The Angels Wanna Wear My) Red Shoes"
12. "Beyond Belief"
13. "Sleep of the Just"♥

==== Tape two: Side one ====
1. "Alison"
2. "Shabby Doll"
3. "Our Little Angel"♥
4. "The Long Honeymoon"♥
5. "Man Called Uncle"
6. "Almost Blue"
7. "Riot Act"
8. "Crimes of Paris"♥
9. "Poisoned Rose"
10. "I Want You" (Single version)
11. "Jack of All Parades"♥

==== Tape two: Side two ====
1. "Oliver's Army"
2. "Little Palaces"♥
3. "Pills and Soap"
4. "Night Rally"♥
5. "American Without Tears"♥
6. "Watch Your Step"
7. "Suit of Lights"♥
8. "Clubland"
9. "Tokyo Storm Warning"
10. "Shipbuilding"
11. "Clowntime Is Over"♥
- Two tracks are featured on the LP and CD, but left off the cassette: "Indoor Fireworks" and "Party Girl".

== See also ==
- Elvis Costello discography
