= New Amsterdam (song) =

Single by Elvis Costello

from the album Get Happy!!
- A-side: "New Amsterdam"; "Dr. Luther's Assistant"
- B-side: "Ghost Train"; "Just a Memory"
- Released: 13 June 1980
- Recorded: Pimlico, England
- Genre: New wave
- Label: F-Beat (UK)
- Songwriter: Elvis Costello
- Producer: Nick Lowe

Elvis Costello singles chronology
"High Fidelity" (1980)	"New Amsterdam" (1980)	"Clubland" (1980)

"New Amsterdam" is a song written and performed by new wave musician Elvis Costello on his 1980 album, Get Happy!! Written about the New World and New York, the recording of the song that appears on Get Happy!! was a demo that Costello had recorded in Pimlico.

The song was released as an EP single, reaching number 36 in the United Kingdom. The song has since been lauded by critics and included on compilation albums.

== Background ==
"New Amsterdam" began as one of many demos produced by Costello after Armed Forces. During this period, Costello recorded demos alone and played all the instruments himself; in this case, he recorded "New Amsterdam" at a "fifteen quid-an-hour demo studio" in Pimlico. Costello recalled, "As you might guess I didn't use a metronome but I did employ the owner's exotic equipment; vibes! a fretless bass! a very nasty synth! even God forbid, DRUMS!!!" This demo version would ultimately be the performance that appeared on the final release of Get Happy!!, as Costello was unsatisfied with attempts made with the Attractions to "re-create the mood". Production of the released track was credited to Nick Lowe, even though the demo session was entirely the work of Costello as both artist and producer.

Lyrically, Costello described "New Amsterdam" as "a song about a bewildered new arrival in the New World". Costello also characterized it as "A bewildered lad, alone in New York, except for his rhyming dictionary". The song's title comes from the name of the Dutch settlement where New York would be established. Musically, the song's softer and slower arrangement (in 3/4, or waltz time) contrasted with much of the more energetic material on the album.

== Release ==
"New Amsterdam" was the third release from Get Happy!!, following "I Can't Stand Up for Falling Down" and "High Fidelity", though, unlike these previous singles, "New Amsterdam" was released as part of an EP. The song was chosen to show Costello's stylistic diversity. The other songs included on the EP were "Dr. Luther's Assistant" (a leftover from This Year's Model), "Ghost Train" (which originated from a lyric Costello wrote in 1972), and "Just a Memory" (which was written for Dusty Springfield). A picture disc EP and a two track 7" single in a different sleeve were also issued. It entered the UK Singles Chart at number 47 and peaked at number 36 the following week in a six week chart run. A music video for the song was also produced.

In addition to its release on Get Happy!!, "New Amsterdam" has appeared on Costello compilations Girls Girls Girls, The Very Best of Elvis Costello and The Attractions 1977–86, and The Very Best of Elvis Costello. The rejected version of the song performed with the Attractions has appeared as a bonus track on later editions of Get Happy!!

== Reception ==
"New Amsterdam" has seen critical acclaim since its release. Tom Carson of Rolling Stone praised the song's melody as "one of the loveliest Costello’s ever written" and wrote that the song "evokes all the melancholy, tenderness and regret of a seemingly hopeless situation". AllMusic's Stephen Thomas Erlewine named it a "full-fledged masterpiece", while the same site's Stewart Mason characterized it as a "simple but beautifully effective song". Cash Box said that "acoustic guitar strumming clicks over the thick keyboard texture." Record World called it a "stark and powerful ballad" in which "Costello doesn't waste a word or an emotion."

Jim Beviglia of American Songwriter named the song Costello's fifteenth best, praising its "dreamy, melancholic vibe" and noting that "anyone who has ever felt like they have no connection to the comforts of home can appreciate 'New Amsterdam,' a lovely place to visit vicariously via Elvis' pretty song even though you would never want to live there". The Daily Telegraph's Martin Chilton ranked the song number ten on his top 40 list of best Costello songs, stating that Costello "does wordplay so well" on the track.

== Live history ==
"New Amsterdam" has remained a live favorite for Costello, who has performed the song over 250 times. Beginning with the tour supporting his 1989 album Spike, Costello has sometimes performed "New Amsterdam" in a medley with a cover of the Beatles' "You've Got to Hide Your Love Away". He performed an acoustic version of this medley at Woodstock '99.

== Charts ==
Chart (1980)	Peak position
UK Singles (OCC)	36
