= Bespoke Songs, Lost Dogs, Detours & Rendezvous =

Compilation album by Various Artists
- Released: May 19, 1998
- Recorded: 1979−97
- Genres: Rock, pop, jazz, classical
- Length: 79:00
- Label: Rhino

Professional ratings
Review scores
| Source | Rating |
|---|---|
| AllMusic | 4/5 stars |

Bespoke Songs, Lost Dogs, Detours & Rendezvous is a 1998 compilation album of songs written by Elvis Costello and performed by various artists. It includes covers of tracks Costello recorded, songs written specifically for other artists and compositions never before released.

== Track listing ==
All songs written by Elvis Costello, except where noted.

| No. | Title | Performing artist | Length |
|---|---|---|---|
| 1. | "Girls Talk" | Dave Edmunds | 3:27 |
| 2. | "Unwanted Number" | For Real | 3:32 |
| 3. | "My Brave Face" (McCartney, Costello) | Paul McCartney | 3:19 |
| 4. | "Hidden Shame" | Johnny Cash | 4:00 |
| 5. | "All Grown Up" | Tasmin Archer | 4:13 |
| 6. | "Miss Mary" (Costello, Zucchero) | Zucchero | 4:28 |
| 7. | "Shadow and Jimmy" (Costello, David Was) | Was (Not Was) | 4:17 |
| 8. | "Upon a Veil of Midnight Blue" | Mary Coughlin | 2:51 |
| 9. | "Deep Dead Blue" (Costello, Bill Frisell) | Anúna | 2:58 |
| 10. | "The Comedians" | Roy Orbison | 3:25 |
| 11. | "The Deportees Club" | Christy Moore | 4:28 |
| 12. | "Punishing Kiss" (Costello, Cait O'Riordan) | Annie Ross | 3:20 |
| 13. | "Shamed Into Love" (Costello, Blades) | Rubén Blades | 4:05 |
| 14. | "Shatterproof" | Billy Bremner | 3:16 |
| 15. | "Dirty Rotten Shame" | Ronnie Drew | 3:45 |
| 16. | "Shipbuilding" (Costello, Clive Langer) | Robert Wyatt | 3:06 |
| 17. | "The Birds Will Still Be Singing" | Norma Waterson | 2:56 |
| 18. | "I Want To Vanish" | June Tabor | 2:22 |
| 19. | "The Other End (Of the Telescope)" (Costello, Aimee Mann) | 'Til Tuesday | 3:55 |
| 20. | "Indoor Fireworks" | Nick Lowe | 3:32 |
| 21. | "Almost Blue" (live) | Chet Baker | 7:45 |
