= Riot Act (song) =

Song by Elvis Costello and the Attractions

from the album Get Happy!!
- Released: 15 February 1980
- Recorded: October 1979
- Studio: Eden (London)
- Genre: New wave
- Length: 3:35
- Label: F-Beat (UK); Columbia (US)
- Songwriter(s): Elvis Costello
- Producer(s): Nick Lowe

"Riot Act" is a song written by new wave musician Elvis Costello and performed by Costello and the Attractions for his 1980 album Get Happy!!. Costello wrote the song as a response to the controversy that had surrounded him in his professional and personal life, particularly relating to his incident in Columbus, Ohio. Recorded originally as a stripped-down acoustic demo, the song was fleshed out in the studio with the Attractions.

"Riot Act" was released on Get Happy!! as an album track and did not get released as a single. Since its release, the song has appeared on numerous compilations and has been praised by critics as a highlight from the Get Happy!! album.

== Background ==
Elvis Costello wrote "Riot Act" partly in the aftermath of his infamous confrontation with Stephen Stills and Bonnie Bramlett in Columbus, Ohio, where he drunkenly referred to James Brown as a "jive-ass nigger" and Ray Charles as a "blind, ignorant nigger". The scandal severely jeopardized Costello's image, particularly in the United States. He has since referred to "Riot Act" as the only song that explicitly references the incident, particularly with his lyric "I got your letter, now they say I don't care for the colour it paints me". Costello commented in 1995, "It says exactly what I meant it to say. It was very truthful. I had to write it."

Costello biographer Graeme Thomson speculated that the song's discontented lyrics also took inspiration from Costello's affair with model Bebe Buell. However, Costello has said his relationship with Buell was "of far less importance than people try to suggest." Costello has said he began writing the song during a seaside holiday he took in the summer of 1978 with his then-estranged wife, Mary, in an unsuccessful attempt to reconcile their marriage.

Costello recorded a demo of the song alongside several other Get Happy!! tracks at "a £15 per hour recording facility in Pimlico". Of these recordings, only the demo of "New Amsterdam" appeared on the final album. However, Costello has spoken positively of the demo (which has since appeared as a bonus track on later editions of the album), noting, "I think it has something that is missing from the final version".

== Release and reception ==
"Riot Act" was released on Costello's fourth album, Get Happy!!, in 1980. The song was not released as a single. Since its initial release, "Riot Act" has appeared on multiple compilation albums, including Girls Girls Girls and The Very Best of Elvis Costello.

"Riot Act" has received critical acclaim and has been named by some critics as one of the highlights of Get Happy!!. Stephen Thomas Erlewine of AllMusic named the track one of the album's "full-fledged masterpieces", while the same site noted Costello's "passionate [vocal] performance that ratchets up the tension until the climax, where he's practically screaming into the microphone during the final chorus". Rolling Stone praised the track's sound as a "grim wasteland" and noted the song's mood as "sinister", particularly in contrast with the preceding track, a cover of "I Stand Accused".

Ultimate Classic Rock ranked the song fifth on their list of the best Elvis Costello songs, writing, "'Riot Act' closes it out on a slow but incredibly emotional note, especially when his voice breaks on the line 'Don't put your heart out on your sleeve / When your remarks are off the cuff' before going into the final chorus".

== Live performances ==
"Riot Act" has intermittently appeared in Costello's live setlist since its release. The track was sometimes performed as part of a solo set unaccompanied by his band, as in Costello's 1984 tour for Goodbye Cruel World.
