= Indoor Fireworks =

Song by Elvis Costello

from the album King of America
- Released: 21 February 1986
- Recorded: July–September 1985
- Studio: Ocean Way, Sunset Sound, & Sound Factory Studio, Los Angeles
- Genre: Roots rock; country rock
- Length: 4:10
- Label: F-Beat (UK); Columbia (US)
- Songwriter: Elvis Costello
- Producer: T Bone Burnett

"Indoor Fireworks" is a song by the English singer-songwriter Elvis Costello that was first released on his 1986 album King of America. Written as a eulogy for a broken relationship, the song utilizes a central metaphor of fireworks and took inspiration from Costello's failed marriage. On the song, Costello is supplemented by the studio professionals of the Confederates, as on most of King of America.

The song has seen positive reception from critics and has appeared on compilation albums. Nick Lowe's cover of the song, appearing on 1985's The Rose of England, has attracted similar acclaim.

== Background ==
With its introspective lyrics and somber tone, "Indoor Fireworks" was written by Elvis Costello as a "lament to the end of love". Both Nick Lowe and author Graeme Thomson surmised the song was written for Costello's first wife, Mary, who was divorcing Costello around this period; Thomson described the song as "a fittingly tender goodbye." Pitchfork noted its lyrics use of fireworks as an "extended metaphor".

Costello attempted the song several times throughout the album sessions with several different arrangements, with performances often being undermined by his consumption of too much whiskey. Costello also attempted a full-band version with members of the Confederates, the studio band that he had just completed recording "Glitter Gulch" with, but determined that the song was "really for another day."

The version of "Indoor Fireworks" that was released on King of America was recorded the day after the sessions that produced "Poisoned Rose" and "Eisenhower Blues". Having drunk and celebrated the successful sessions the night before, Costello attended the sessions in "pretty poor shape". Costello then recorded the song in one take with James Burton on acoustic guitar, Jerry Scheff on string bass, and Mitchell Froom on organ. Though the band attempted more takes, the first take would be the one selected for release: as Costello commented, "It was probably best that we cut it quickly as this kind of romantic obituary is not something you would want to labour over."

== Release ==
Costello's recording of "Indoor Fireworks" was first released in February 1986 as the sixth track on Costello's 1986 album King of America. The song was not released as a single, though Costello has integrated the song into his live setlist several times, including duets with Nick Lowe and Emmylou Harris.

In addition to appearing on King of America, the song has appeared on compilations such as 1989's Girls Girls Girls, 1994's The Very Best of Elvis Costello and The Attractions 1977–86, 1999's The Very Best of Elvis Costello, and 2007's The Best of Elvis Costello: The First 10 Years.

A new 2024 recording of "Indoor Fireworks", subtitled "Memphis Magnetic Version", was released on the super deluxe box set King of America & Other Realms on 1 November 2024, along with a new remaster of the original recording.

== Critical reception ==
"Indoor Fireworks" has seen critical acclaim since its release, with many writers at the time noting the complementary nature of the song's simple metaphor and spare acoustic performance. Geoffrey Himes of The Washington Post singled the song out as "the very best song" on the album, comparing it to Smokey Robinson and noting, "Over an admirably restrained ballad arrangement, MacManus delivers one of his best vocals ever." Musician commented, "He's still the master of drawn-out, playfully double-entendre metaphor; on 'Indoor Fireworks,' however, Costello's feeling vocal also conveys a touching sentiment behind the verbal pyrotechnics." The Los Angeles Times noted that the song "gets more mileage out of one incendiary metaphor than might be thought possible", while The Star-Ledger called the song "a compellingly logical extended metaphor about the dishonesty of lover's quarrels." The Milwaukee Journal concluded, "The straightforward stories of 'Indoor Fireworks' and 'I'll Wear It Proudly' are some of most exquisite of his career, and like many of the LP's tracks, Costello's vocals carry these tunes with only the help of acoustic instruments."

Retrospective writers were similarly effusive in their praise for the track. Rolling Stone spoke glowingly of the track, concluding, "Nothing else in Costello's career has the soul power of these twisted adult love ballads, especially 'I'll Wear It Proudly,' 'Indoor Fireworks' and 'Jack of All Parades.'" Pitchfork noted how Costello's "straight-faced delivery" rendered the recording "all the more devastating".

The Telegraph ranked it Costello's seventh best song, calling it "a simple, bleak and powerful song about love gone bad".

== Nick Lowe version ==
"Indoor Fireworks" was covered by Costello's longtime friend and former producer, Nick Lowe. This version was released on his August 1985 The Rose of England, months before Costello released his own version in February 1986. Lowe was initially skeptical when Costello suggested the song: "Although Elvis is a great songwriter, his songs usually have tons of chords and vocal twists and very personal lyrics, none of which really fit my style. But he played me the song, 'Indoor Fireworks,' and it was pretty straightforward." Costello described Lowe's version as "more discreet than my own, with a very elegant vocal set against an unsettling arrangement."

Lowe's marriage to Carlene Carter was ending during this period, leading Costello to comment, "By the time each version was issued I think we both knew, only too well, what the song was really about." Carter concurred, "I know that in some ways the song was as true for Nick as it was for me." Lowe, however, joked, "My own marriage had also just ended, but there had been no fireworks; it was all quite amicable and boring."

In addition to appearing on The Rose of England, Lowe's version was released on the album Bespoke Songs, Lost Dogs, Detours & Rendezvous, a collection of Costello-written songs recorded by other artists. Lowe has also performed the song live, including as a duet with Costello.

Lowe's version has similarly attracted critical acclaim. American Songwriter described Lowe's cover as the "definitive" version of the song, while AllMusic commented in a review of The Rose of England, "His stark take on Elvis Costello's lovely 'Indoor Fireworks' ... gives the album an anchor."
