= Girls Talk (Elvis Costello song) =

1979 new wave song

Single by Dave Edmunds

from the album Repeat When Necessary
- B-side: "Bad is Bad"
- Released: 25 May 1979
- Recorded: 1978
- Genre: Power pop; new wave
- Length: 3:25
- Label: Swan Song
- Songwriter: Elvis Costello
- Producer: Dave Edmunds

Dave Edmunds singles chronology
| "A1 On The Jukebox" (1979) | "Girls Talk" (1979) | "Queen of Hearts" (1979) |

"Girls Talk"

Single by Elvis Costello and the Attractions
- A-side: "I Can't Stand Up for Falling Down"
- Released: March 1980
- Recorded: 1979
- Length: 1:56
- Label: F-Beat (UK); Columbia (USA)
- Songwriter: Elvis Costello
- Producer: Nick Lowe

Elvis Costello and the Attractions singles chronology
| "Accidents Will Happen" (1979) | "Girls Talk" (1980) | "High Fidelity" (1980) |

"Girls Talk" is a new wave song written by Elvis Costello and first recorded by Dave Edmunds in 1978. Costello gave an early version of the song to Edmunds, who reworked the song and released it on his album Repeat When Necessary. Edmunds' version peaked at number four on the UK Singles Chart and number 12 in Ireland, becoming one of Edmunds' most successful career singles.

Linda Rondstadt also recorded the song for her album, "Mad Love," in 1980, but did not release it as a single.

Costello later released his version of the song as a B-side to his version of "I Can't Stand Up for Falling Down", a rendition featuring a soul-inflected arrangement with a prominent bass line performed by Attractions bassist Bruce Thomas. Both Edmunds' and Costello's versions have attracted critical acclaim.

== Background ==
In the liner notes for the 2002 Rhino reissue of Get Happy!!, Costello stated that the record was about women's gossip.

The most successful version of the song was by Dave Edmunds, to whom Costello says he donated the song "in a moment of drunken bravado." Edmunds said, "Elvis came to the studio one day, and he said, 'I've got a song for you.' And he gave me a cassette. Now, it wasn't very good – it was just him on a guitar, and he was rushing through it at a furious pace. At first I couldn't see it. I really liked the complete new arrangement and feel that I put to it. I'm not sure Elvis liked it, mind you. He's quite an intense person and he's quick to point out things that he doesn't like."

Released in June 1979, Edmunds' version charted at number 4 on the UK Singles Chart, spending 11 weeks on the chart. It was his final top ten hit in that country. The single additionally reached number 65 on the US Hot 100, a rare commercial success for Edmunds there. The success of Edmunds' version also boosted Costello's reputation as a coverable songwriter; Edmunds later joked while introducing the song at a concert, "Here's a song by Elvis Costello, and he thanks you from the bottom of his wallet."

Costello recorded a version which was released as the B-side of his single "I Can't Stand Up for Falling Down", and was a fixture of the set lists for his tours for some time after it was recorded. Bassist Bruce Thomas commented that it started out as a "country song" before the band rearranged it around Thomas' bass line, which Costello compared to the bass part from "A Love Supreme".

== Music video ==
A music video was produced for the song. It features Edmunds and Rockpile playing on the roof of the Warner Brothers Records building in Midtown Manhattan as well as assorted shots of people walking through Manhattan.

== Critical reception ==
"Girls Talk" has seen critical acclaim since its release. In a 1979 article, The New York Times wrote of Edmunds' version, "Mr. Edmunds tackles the sort of airy pop lyricism that is Mr. Lowe's specialty with consummate taste and skill." The Miami Herald opined in 1980, "When Edmunds did 'Girls Talk,' he stole the song away from Costello and made it his own." AllMusic referred to the Edmunds take as a "classic" in a retrospective review.

Costello's version has also attracted acclaim. Stewart Mason of AllMusic gave the song a positive review retrospectively, complimenting the tone of "suppressed menace", and saying that "it features some of his sharpest lyrics of the era". In addition, Debra Rae Cohen of Rolling Stone said that although Edmunds' version was "cocky [and] rowdy", "Costello restores the tune's paranoiac underpinnings with the nervous quaver of his voice and soft keyboard parts that echo like footfalls". Musician Aimee Mann included Costello's version on her list of "songs that made her," commenting, "I used to cover 'Girls Talk' live for a while. I was so crazy about that song."

== Chart history ==
=== Weekly charts ===
| Chart (1979–1980) | Peak position |
|---|---|
| Australia (Kent Music Report) | 9 |
| Canada RPM Top Singles | 18 |
| Ireland (IRMA) | 11 |
| UK Singles Chart | 4 |
| US Billboard Hot 100 | 65 |
| US Cash Box Top 100 | 65 |

=== Year-end charts ===
| Chart (1979) | Rank |
|---|---|
| Australia (Kent Music Report) | 59 |
