= Senior Service (song) =

Song by Elvis Costello and the Attractions

from the album Armed Forces
- Released: 5 January 1979
- Recorded: August–September 1978
- Genre: New wave
- Label: Radar (UK); Columbia (US)
- Songwriter(s): Elvis Costello
- Producer(s): Nick Lowe

"Senior Service" is a song written by new wave musician Elvis Costello and performed by Elvis Costello and the Attractions for their 1979 album Armed Forces. Featuring a danceable arrangement inspired by David Bowie, the song includes punning lyrics referencing the cigarette brand of the same name and decrying the effects of the elderly on the British welfare system.

"Senior Service" was released on Armed Forces as an album track and did not get released as a single. It has since seen positive critical reception from critics.

== Background ==
"Senior Service" was, according to Costello, heavily influenced by textures on David Bowie's albums Station to Station, Low, and "Heroes", albums that Costello and the Attractions had been listening to regularly during the recording of Armed Forces. Costello explained, "The effect of [Bowie's influence] can be heard overtly in the keyboard and background voices" on the song. The production on the song is notably "crisp" and "bright"; with a stop-start drum part from Pete Thomas and a keyboard line from Steve Nieve that has been compared to ABBA, the song's arrangement is notably dance-friendly.

Lyrically, "Senior Service" references both the Royal Navy and the cigarette brand of the same name, a brand marketed toward middle-class suburbanites. The cigarette brand was a favorite of Costello producer Nick Lowe. Wordplay related to the cigarette brand can be seen in lyrics such as "It's the breath you took too late/It's the death that's worse than fate". According to Geoffrey Himes of The Washington Post, the song "assaults older workers who clog up Britain's seniority-based social system".

== Release and reception ==
"Senior Service" was released as the second track on Armed Forces in January 1979. At 2:18, the song is the shortest on the album. It did not get released as a single.

"Senior Service" has generally seen positive critical reception since release. AllMusic's Stewart Mason described it as "the epitome of Costello's early angry young man phase", noting that the "juvenile spite" coming from "the deliberately ridiculous rinky-dink melody" makes the track "feel really good, and so there's something primitively cathartic about the song". Ed Masley of The Arizona Republic called it one of "the quirkiest songs [Costello has] ever written", while Ryan Cormier of The News Journal called it "a hidden gem". Writer Greil Marcus described the song as "a vicious mix of sexual jealousy and terror - in fact the Terror with Costello as Madame Defarge."

== Live history ==
"Senior Service" has been infrequently performed live by Costello, most recently at a 2014 concert in Wilmington, Delaware. The song was lip synced by Costello and the Attractions on the Dutch television program TopPop in 1979.
