= High Fidelity (song) =

Single by Elvis Costello and the Attractions

from the album Get Happy!!
- B-side: "Getting Mighty Crowded"
- Released: 4 April 1980
- Recorded: 1979
- Genre: New wave; soul
- Label: F-Beat (UK)
- Songwriter: Elvis Costello
- Producer: Nick Lowe

Elvis Costello and the Attractions singles chronology
"I Can't Stand Up for Falling Down" (1980)	"High Fidelity" (1980)	"New Amsterdam" (1980)

"High Fidelity" is a song written and performed by new wave musician Elvis Costello on his 1980 album, Get Happy!! Written about an adulterous couple where one member still hopes for reconciliation, "High Fidelity" reflected the personal struggles that Costello had been suffering at the time as a result of increased fame and controversy. Musically, the song was influenced by Motown and was initially performed in a slower style inspired by David Bowie's Station to Station.

"High Fidelity" was released as the second single from Get Happy!! in April 1980. The single reached number 30 in the United Kingdom. The song has since been lauded by critics and has been included on several Costello compilation albums.

== Background ==
In his autobiography, Costello described "High Fidelity" as, "an incredibly sad, delusion of a song, in which a couple find themselves in different rooms with different lovers, one of them still irrationally believing their pledge will endure both the initial faithlessness and the solace of revenge." Costello reflected on the song, "This amoral tale might have over-done the self pity had it not been for the comical drunkenness of the singer." Like many other songs on Get Happy!!, "High Fidelity" references Motown; the opening line of the song, "Some things you never get used to", is a reference to the song of the same name by Diana Ross & the Supremes.

Costello's personal and public struggles inspired the disillusionment of the song's lyrics; he explained, "By the middle of 1979, when almost all of my alibis and excuses had been stripped away and both my personal and professional life were in complete disarray, I wrote [the lyrics to 'High Fidelity']." In the liner notes to Get Happy!!, Costello cited "High Fidelity" as an example of a song that reflected his "three years of misadventure" in the limelight.

"High Fidelity" was first played as a "lumbering" version on the 1979 American Armed Funk tour. An early live version of the song later appeared as a bonus track on the 2003 Get Happy!! reissue. Costello stated that this version "records our attempts to play the song after the fashion of David Bowie's Station to Station album." Of the finished version, Costello later said, "This is a pretty exciting record. It's very raw singing and a great rhythm track. We cut it in Holland, where we had nothing else to do but go mad in the studio."

== Release ==
"High Fidelity" was released as the second single from Get Happy!! after "I Can't Stand Up for Falling Down." The single's B-side featured a version of Betty Everett's "Getting Mighty Crowded" recorded during the Get Happy!! sessions as well as an early, slower version of "Clowntime Is Over." The release of the single was accompanied by a music video, of which Costello said, "Nice dance routine with this one!" The single was a modest commercial success in the UK, reaching number 30 on the UK Singles Chart over a stay of five weeks. The single would be the last in a string of eight straight UK Top 30 singles that Costello had charted.

Since its release, "High Fidelity" has appeared on several compilation albums, including Girls Girls Girls, The Very Best of Elvis Costello and The Attractions 1977–86, The Very Best of Elvis Costello, and The Best of Elvis Costello: The First 10 Years.

== Reception ==
Since its release, "High Fidelity" has seen critical acclaim. Reviewed at the time of release, Rolling Stone said, "Even as Costello whispers menacingly, the tune's tense, martial beat propels him toward the inevitable realization that he doesn't have any choice. He accepts his fate, yet he isn't resigned to it. Not by a long shot." AllMusic declared it a "full-fledged masterpiece," while Trouser Press wrote, "'High Fidelity' is a dynamic song (with a bit of Four Tops sound) delivered with convincing grit and wit, and stands as one of Get Happy!!'s high spots."

Martin Chilton of The Daily Telegraph ranked the song number 28 on his top 40 list of best Costello songs. Brett Milano of uDiscoverMusic listed the song in the "Fan Favorites" section of the 20 best Elvis Costello songs, writing, "'High Fidelity” earns a place here as Costello's most danceable track. Fueled by amphetamines and vintage vinyl, he and the Attractions jumped into 60s soul for the 20-track epic Get Happy!!, and with this tune, they proved they could do a Motown groove with the best of them."

== Charts ==
Chart (1980)	Peak position
UK Singles (Official Charts)	30
