= Get Happy!! =

Studio album by Elvis Costello and the Attractions
- Released: 15 February 1980
- Recorded: October 1979
- Studio: Eden (London); Wisseloord (Hilversum) (Note: "New Amsterdam" was recorded as a demo at a small eight-track studio in Pimlico.)
- Genres: New wave; soul; R&B
- Length: 48:08
- Labels: F-Beat; Columbia
- Producer: Nick Lowe

Elvis Costello and the Attractions chronology
Armed Forces (1979)	Get Happy!! (1980)	Taking Liberties (1980)

Singles from Get Happy!!
- 1. "I Can't Stand Up for Falling Down" Released: 8 February 1980; 2. "High Fidelity" Released: 4 April 1980; 3. "New Amsterdam" Released: June 1980

Get Happy!! is the fourth studio album by the English singer-songwriter Elvis Costello, and his third with the Attractions — keyboardist Steve Nieve, bassist Bruce Thomas and drummer Pete Thomas (no relation). It was released on 15 February 1980 through F-Beat Records in the United Kingdom and Columbia Records in the United States. Produced by Nick Lowe and engineered by Roger Béchirian, the sessions began in London but moved to the Netherlands after Costello found the material derivative of his previous album, Armed Forces (1979). The sessions were problematic but resulted in a large number of songs; the final album contains 20 tracks across a single LP.

A departure from Costello's prior works, Get Happy!! was influenced by R&B, ska and soul music of the 1960s. Two cover songs are included: Sam & Dave's "I Can't Stand Up for Falling Down" and the Merseybeats' "I Stand Accused". In contrast to the upbeat music, the mostly downbeat lyrics concern doomed romances and other recurring themes. Initial album sleeves reversed the side listings, which was corrected for later reissues. The cover art reflects the soul influence and was designed to resemble a 1960s Stax record, with the UK release featuring a pre-worn sleeve image.

Initially delayed due to a dispute with Warner Bros. and Costello's former label, Radar Records, Get Happy!! charted at No. 2 in the UK and No. 11 in the US, but sold less than Armed Forces. It was supported by a UK tour and three singles, of which "I Can't Stand Up for Falling Down" reached the UK top five. The album received positive reviews from music critics. Many focused on the quantity of tracks, which they felt varied in quality, although others gave high praise to the record and to Costello himself. It is retrospectively viewed as one of his best works. Appearing on lists of the best albums of the 1980s, it has been reissued multiple times with bonus tracks.

== Background ==
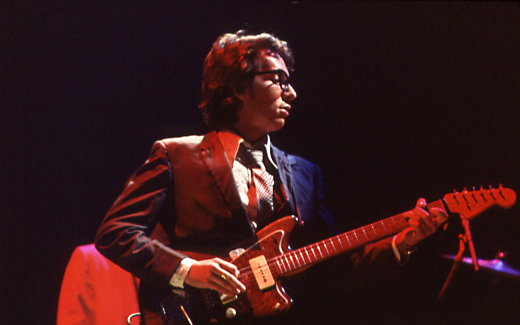
Costello onstage in April 1978

Costello and the Attractions had supported his third studio album, Armed Forces, on the Armed Funk tour in America from February to April 1979. The tour was plagued with issues, including drug and alcohol problems, aggressive behaviour from Costello and his manager Jake Riviera toward the press, and uneven performances that led to critical and audience backlash. (Note: According to Thomson, Bruce Springsteen was playing three-hour shows around this time, so American audiences were expecting longer shows. When Costello played sets less than an hour long, he drew criticism.) In March, Costello engaged in a drunken exchange with Stephen Stills, where he insulted various American musical artists, including James Brown and Ray Charles, using racial slurs. Costello quickly acknowledged the incident without apology in a press conference when details became public, and he received further backlash including death threats and Armed Forces being pulled from radio stations. By the tour's end, Costello's reputation in America was nearly destroyed. Bruce Thomas later admitted: "We never really recovered from that tour. Every time Elvis is doing something well, he kind of sabotages it." His reputation in the United Kingdom remained largely unaffected, mostly due to newspapers failing to pick up the story. The author Mick St. Michael compares it to the worldwide response from John Lennon's 1966 more popular than Jesus comment.

Costello referenced the incident in an interview with Rolling Stone in 1982, feeling that it "outweighs my entire career", but later reflected in his 2015 memoir Unfaithful Music & Disappearing Ink: "So what if my career was rolled back off the launching pad? Life eventually became a lot more interesting due to this failure to get into some undeserved and potentially fatal orbit." Although he remained with Columbia Records, he did not tour America again until 1981, in support of Trust. Following the disastrous tour, he decided to reevaluate himself and his career. He ended his relationship with Bebe Buell and reconciled with his wife Mary. Apart from recording the occasional demo and doing promotional gigs, he and the Attractions took some time off from each other over the summer of 1979; Costello produced the Specials' debut album in June while his band recorded an album released in September, Mad About the Wrong Boy. During his time working with the Specials, Costello taped demos at Archipelago, a small eight-track studio in Pimlico, London, playing all instruments himself. This yielded versions of "Black and White World", "Riot Act", "Five Gears in Reverse", "Love for Tender", "King Horse", "New Amsterdam" and "Men Called Uncle". According to his biographer Graeme Thomson, Costello had grown to hate the sound of Armed Forces and aimed to take a different direction for his next album.

== Recording ==
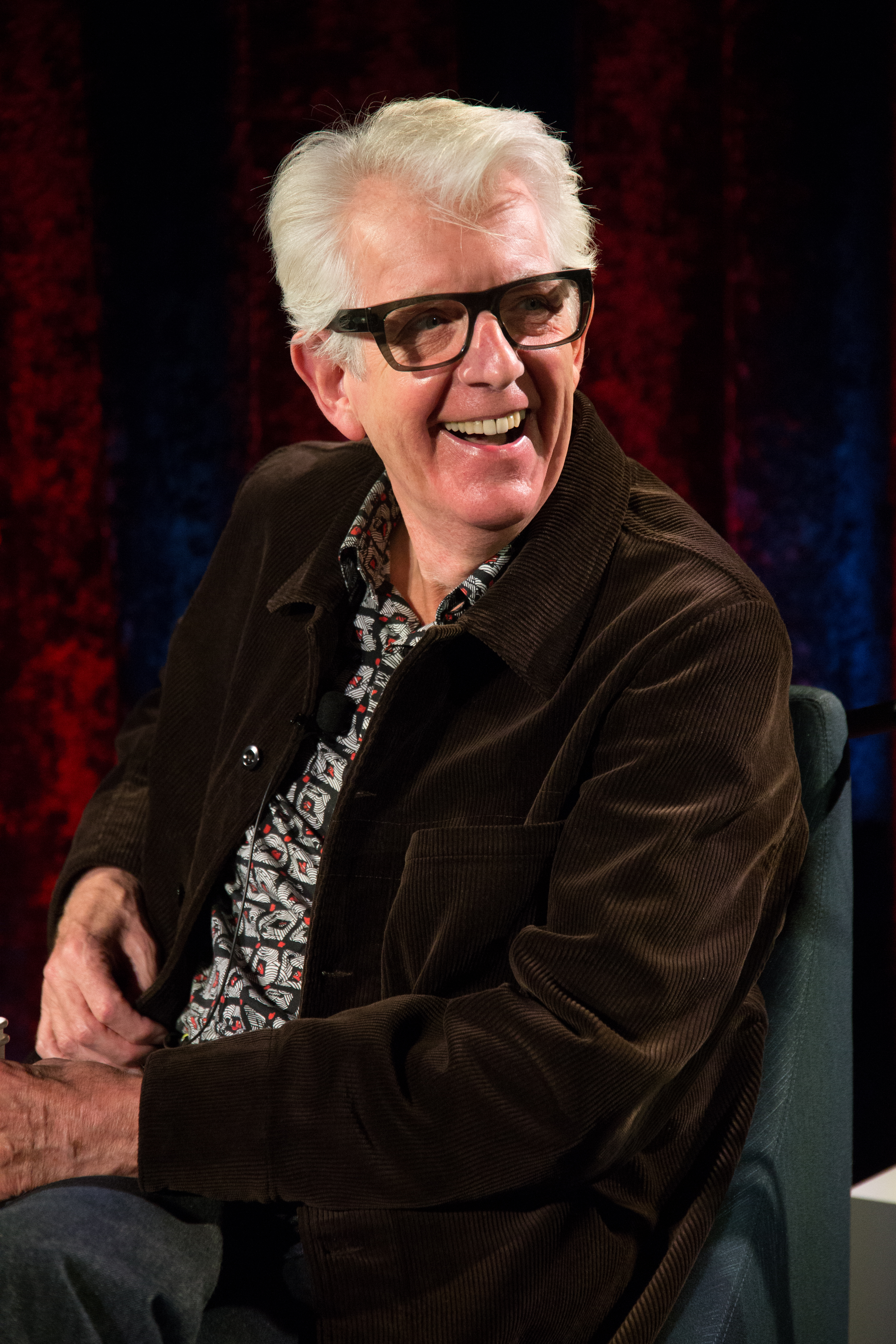
Get Happy!! was the fourth of five consecutive Costello albums produced by Nick Lowe (pictured in 2017).

Costello and the Attractions regrouped at London's Eden Studios in September and October 1979 to rehearse the new tracks but, having written and performed some of the material during the preceding tour in a style similar to Armed Forces, Costello was displeased with the results, finding them derivative and too "new wave". Bruce Thomas recalled: "We sounded like the Jags. Bad Elvis and the Attractions impersonators, basically, who played everything fast and in eights." Thomson noted that the band's classic sound was now outdated and the initial attempt at "B Movie" sounded like "a desperate attempt" at rewriting "Oliver's Army" (1979). Wanting a new direction, Costello immersed himself in the soul music he'd enjoyed as a teenager, and purchased several soul records in London's Camden Town, such as Motown Chartbusters Vol. 3 and Atlantic Records' This Is Soul, which he gave to the band as inspiration. They then went back and re-arranged many of the songs in a more rhythm-and-blues style. The band also grew tired of Eden and relocated to Wisseloord Studios in Hilversum, Netherlands, with producer Nick Lowe and engineer Roger Béchirian. (Note: Attributed to multiple references:)

Recording took place throughout the remainder of October 1979. Despite the change in scenery, the sessions were enveloped with problems. The band drank frequently, while Béchirian recalled it being a "cocaine haze", adding: "It wasn't pleasant at all. You could see the seams coming apart at that point." Having played the majority of songs live before going into the studio on previous albums, the band now had little time to pause as the new songs were being rearranged frequently. Nieve suffered an emotional meltdown, and Bruce and Pete Thomas were unhappy with their bass and drum sounds. Lowe also found issues with the studio, even having Costello record his vocals in the booth designed for string instruments: "[It] was extremely Euro. It was like trying to make a record as the Eurovision song contest was going on all around you."

The band recorded a large number of songs during the sessions, and almost all of the 20 tracks fitted onto the resulting album were under two-and-a-half minutes in length. According to Costello, the vinyl cutting and pressing process had to be precise to fit all of them onto the two sides of an LP. Two cover versions made the final tracklist: the Sam & Dave B-side "I Can't Stand Up for Falling Down" and the Merseybeats' "I Stand Accused". Although covers had frequently appeared in Costello's live sets and as B-sides, Get Happy!! marked the first appearance of non-original material on one of his UK studio albums. The Archipelago recording of "New Amsterdam" was kept for the final album, as Costello felt it could not be improved upon. Outtakes that appeared as UK B-sides included "Girls Talk", an alternate version of "Clowntime Is Over", and a cover of Betty Everett's "Getting Mighty Crowded".

== Music and lyrics ==
We just changed direction completely. I said, 'Let's just play these songs as if we were a soul band, Booker T and the MGs, so we had a particular time frame in terms of arrangements. It was based on Stax and Motown around 1965 to 1968, but played by these maniacs who had just been flying around the world for two years, and going nuts.'

— Elvis Costello, Radio One

Musically, Get Happy!! represents a departure from Costello's previous records, taking influences from the R&B and soul sound of the 1960s, as well as ska. Michael Gallucci of Ultimate Classic Rock described it as "a throwback to '60s R&B music played with new wave bite". In his book Let Them All Talk, the biographer Brian Hinton states that with Get Happy!!, the artist invested in "soul sources with an introspection and bitterness previously alien to the genre". Costello said that not all the tracks took direct influence from R&B and soul: "Human Touch" was influenced by his recent work producing the Specials; "Men Called Uncle" and "Beaten to the Punch" owed a debt to the early-1960s Liverpool sound that also included The Merseybeats' "I Stand Accused". Some critics inferred the songs on Get Happy!! were a response to the events of the Armed Funk tour, although in his 2003 reissue liner notes, Costello said "Riot Act" was the only track on the album to refer to the incident, further commenting:

It might have been tempting to claim that I had some noble motive in basing this record on the music that I had admired and learned from prior to my brush with infamy. But if I was trying to pay respects and make such amends, I doubt if pride would have allowed me to express that thought after I had made my rather contrived explanation ... I simply went back to work and relied on instinct, curiosity, and enduring musical passions.

The album's title is taken from the song of the same name, written by Harold Arlen and Ted Koehler. The biographer Tony Clayton-Lea finds it an ironic comment on the LP's "steeped in discontent" lyrical content. The upbeat arrangements are in stark contrast to the lyrics, particularly on "King Horse". Reviewing the album on release, critic Robert Hilburn of the Los Angeles Times found the song titles hint at the "jarring encounters" described throughout, naming "Beaten to the Punch", "Temptation", "Possession", "Clowntime Is Over" and "High Fidelity". The biographer David Gouldstone splits the tracks on the album into songs concerned with public issues ("Opportunity", "Clowntime Is Over", "5ive Gears in Reverse" and "Temptation") and songs detailing personal conflicts (all other tracks). He notes that almost all the songs have narrators, with "King Horse" highlighting that they all have human failings. A theme of doomed romance, inspired by the artist's former relationship with Buell, appears in "Beaten to the Punch", "Riot Act", "Men Called Uncle", "New Amsterdam" and "B Movie". Additionally, The Ringer's Elizabeth Nelson retrospectively found that Costello intended "Temptation", "Opportunity" and "Possession" to be "a kind of Burroughs-like, cut-up trilogy", dissecting them as "a tortured romance in three acts" or "a plan for military domination".

The original album sleeve labels for Get Happy!! were reversed; side one began with "I Can't Stand Up for Falling Down" and ended with "Riot Act", while side two started with "Love for Tender" and ended with "High Fidelity", which was corrected for later reissues. The author James E. Perone argues that the swapping is significant, as the album makes "more rhetorical sense" with "Love for Tender" as the opener and "Riot Act" as the closer.

=== Side one ===
Opening track "Love for Tender" is an upbeat R&B track that demonstrates the soul influence with a James Jamerson-style bass and Motown-era handclaps and percussion. The rushed song uses thematic punning to reference both affection and monetary advances. A reworking of the Armed Forces outtake "Clean Money", Costello stated that he used the same "You Can't Hurry Love" riff that the Jam used for "Town Called Malice", a 1982 UK number one. Nelson found the opening lines ("You won't take my love for tender?") set a precedent for the entire album, in which "one clever but fractious phrase after another unspools as though autogenerated from a demented mail-order catalog". "Opportunity" is the first of several cryptic songs on the album. The partly autobiographical number contains references to being watched or under surveillance, which the narrator is powerless to do anything about except wait for opportunities to come. Gouldstone gives an interpretation of the song as "a dissident aside on the values and organisation of post-war Britain".

"The Imposter" is the narrator's attack on a man who has won the affection over a woman he is also in love with; to the narrator, he is an 'imposter' and is surprised no one else sees it. (Note: Costello gave himself the moniker "The Imposter" in occasional production credits, while his later backing band—the Attractions minus Bruce Thomas and with Davey Faragher—are dubbed the Imposters.) The tracks employs a punk-ska groove. "Secondary Modern" utilises a slower soul groove with downbeat lyrics. Like other tracks, the narrator pleas for a woman to accept him. Interpreting the phrase "secondary modern" – schools for children that failed grammar school – Gouldstone finds that the phrase might have appealed to Costello due to its "secondary importance" in modern times, which is the final fate of most of his songs' characters.

Like "The Imposter", "King Horse" is aimed at tough guys who harass waitresses and stewardesses. Gouldstone comments that "to call someone 'king horse' is in effect to accuse them of being driven by ruthless selfishness, of trampling over other people to reach their desires". Musically, the song uses the guitar figure from the Four Tops' "Reach Out I'll Be There" (1966). AllMusic's Rick Anderson argued that it anticipated the sound Costello would explore on Trust the following year. "Possession" was written in Holland during a five-minute taxi ride heading back to the studio from a local café. Reassuring a recurring theme of finance and business throughout Get Happy!!, the song concerns a failed relationship and implies that money be provided rather than love itself. In "Men Called Uncle", the narrator shows distaste for a woman and her older man. As in other tracks, he displays indifference toward her, but deep down he desires her love and affection. Perone finds the music similar to the pop styles of the 1960s British Invasion.

The lyrics of "Clowntime Is Over" are vague, but Gouldstone argues that it concerns "some kind of lament"; and words and phrases such as "blackmail", "ransom", "somebody's watching" and "a voice in the shadows" offer sinister undertones. Critic Dave McCullough wrote that the song has a "familiar feeling of aggressive assurity, relayed in a sudden jerk at the end of every verse". Musically, Nelson compares the song to "circus music from the Weimar Republic" set against a "mechanized march" she likens to Kraftwerk and David Bowie's Berlin period.

Unlike the rest of the album, "New Amsterdam" is a folk-like waltz, and was recorded by Costello alone as a demo. It has nostalgic lyrics about arriving in the New World. Costello has acknowledged his musical inspiration by interpolating the Beatles' song "You've Got to Hide Your Love Away" into concert performances of "New Amsterdam". Hinton notes that it is the only song here that comes from a non-persona. (Note: Attributed to multiple references:) "High Fidelity" marks a return to the soul influences, with a sound echoing the Supremes; its opening line also quotes a song title by them. The lyrics are addressed to an ex-partner who now has found a new lover and contain Costello's signature wordplay to reference radios and record players.

=== Side two ===
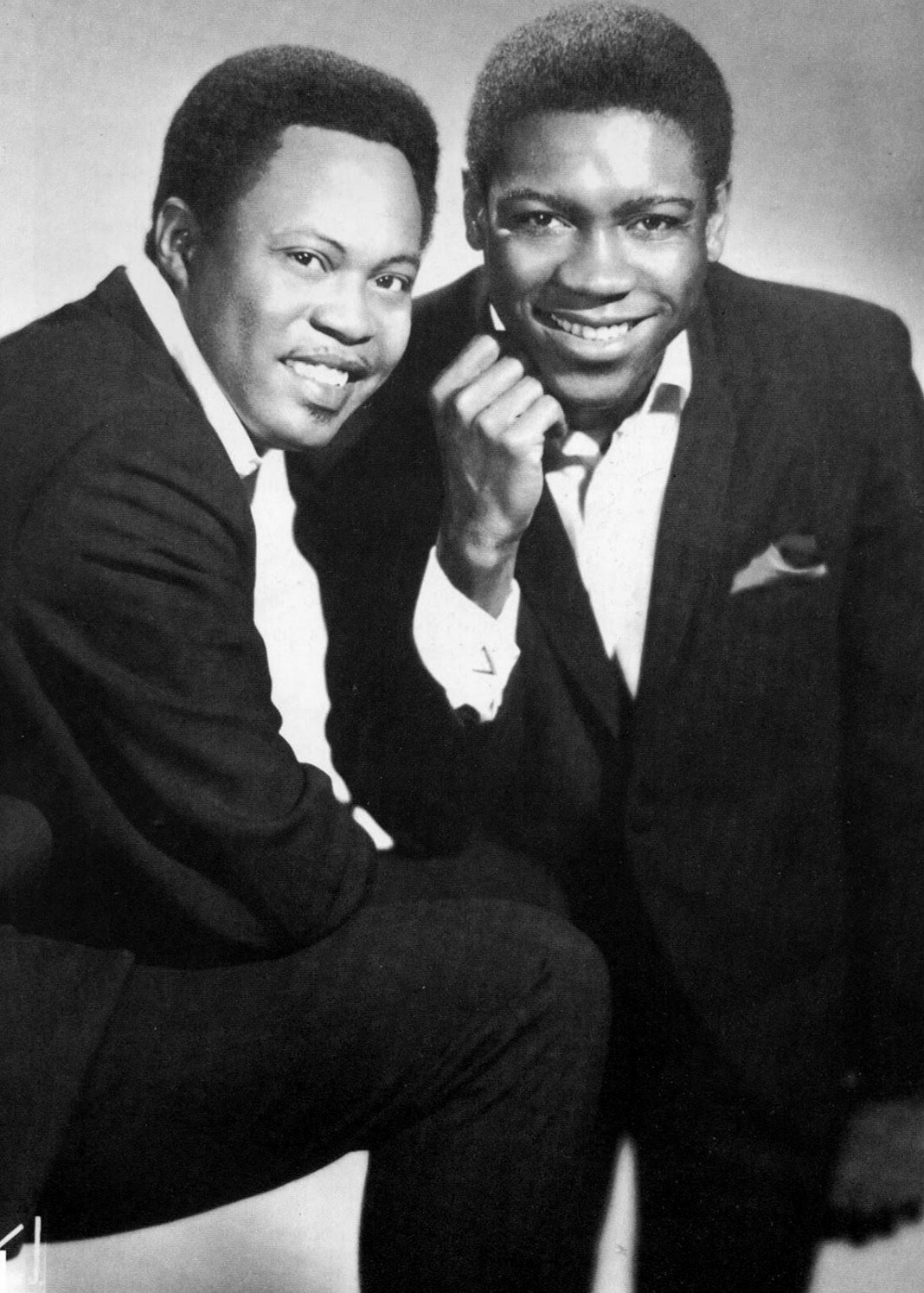
Costello's cover of "I Can't Stand Up for Falling Down" by Sam & Dave (pictured in 1967) appears on side two.

Opening side two is the cover of "I Can't Stand Up for Falling Down", a soul track that describes a hurtful love affair. Gouldstone stated that its presence adds "authentic sixties atmosphere" to the LP. The title of "Black and White World" recalls the early days of cinema and the simpler days of childhood. With a theme of nostalgia similar to "New Amsterdam", the song reflects on days of innocence gone by, and also combines ideals of time, the media and battles between the sexes set against, in Gouldstone's words, "powerful and gripping music". "5ive Gears in Reverse" implies that society is digressing rather than progressing, with the chorus relating hopelessness and futility. Driven by a guitar riff and bassline, it is sung "lustfully" rather than "lustily". Hinton finds the track also acts as a "raison d'etre" for the album, "backwards into the future".

Both "B Movie" and "Motel Matches" feature wordplay referencing Costello's life while on the road for three years, complementing the lyrics on Armed Forces. Described by McCullough as "a quivering skeleton of a song", the former is addressed to a woman, seemingly putting her down and casually hinting at violence. The latter song, while not as brutal, describes an unsatisfactory affair taking place in a motel room, and the story is delivered in such a way that Hinton says "emotion overtakes cleverness". Returning to ska rhythms in the ambivalent "Human Touch", the narrator is disgusted by his partner and the world, begins drinking heavily and physically assaulting her, yet he longs for her "human touch". Gouldstone finds that the music mimics the disintegration of the narrator's mind. Hinton likens the track to "Lip Service" from This Year's Model (1978) or, in theory, Costello's take on the Beatles' "Ob-La-Di, Ob-La-Da" (1968). Hinton also draws Beatles comparisons for "Beaten to the Punch", which contains the same bassline as "Taxman" (1966). The energetic song is an attack on a man and his "juvenile macho attitudes".

Costello based "Temptation" on Booker T. & the M.G.'s' "Time Is Tight" (1969). As a song about alcoholism and defenselessness, it is similar to other Get Happy!! tracks, and presumed by Gouldstone to concern the troubles of living in a competitive and bureaucratic society. The author also argues that the cover of "I Stand Accused" could pass as a Costello original due to its performance and use of thematic punning. The final track, "Riot Act", reflects on a past relationship with "abject desolation" rather than disdain. Costello gives a tender vocal performance that displays emotion and builds into a near-scream by the end. Hinton calls it the "first genuinely relaxed song on the whole LP" and compares the music to the English band Procol Harum, while AllMusic's Stewart Mason considers the arrangement "almost bombastic".

== Packaging and artwork ==
According to Hinton, the cover artwork for Get Happy!! was designed to resemble a vintage Stax record from the 1960s. Designed by Barney Bubbles, and featuring a clash of changing colours, the geometric sleeve contains three identical images of Costello photographed from above, with his hands in the pockets of a buttoned-up coat and his face appearing "almost deformed". (This triplicate image is upside-down and taken from a photo of Costello laying down on a cobblestoned alley.) The UK release featured a "pre-worn" look on the sleeve: the center of the front cover showed label ring wear, while the back featured a larger circle of ring wear, giving the effect that the vinyl within had worn through the packaging. This effect also appeared on albums manufactured and sold in some European countries and in Japan (including some cassette and CD versions) and omitted from other editions. Original copies also lacked a lyric sheet.

== Release and promotion ==
Originally intended for release in early January 1980, Get Happy!! was delayed due to legal issues. In December 1979, Radar Records founder Andrew Lauder and Riviera left the label and formed a new independent label, F-Beat Records. Any UK signee to Radar's was also signed to the label's parent company, Warner Bros, and Warner disliked both Costello and Lowe leaving without recompense. The dispute eventually went to court. Costello attempted to release the first chosen single, "I Can't Stand Up for Falling Down", on the Specials' label 2 Tone Records, but Warner blocked its release due to the ongoing legal proceedings. Once resolved, the song, backed by "Girls Talk", was rush-released as the first single on 8 February and reached number four on the UK Singles Chart. Get Happy!! followed it in the UK a week later on 15 February 1980, over a year after its predecessor, released with the catalogue number XXLP 1. In the US, it was issued through Columbia the week of 25 February.

Throughout March 1980, Costello and the Attractions toured the UK for the first time in almost a year, playing in smaller venues in lesser-known cities compared to previous live outings. Drawing on material from his four albums up to that point—primarily Get Happy!! and This Year's Model—and covering various soul tunes to reflect Costello's renewed appreciation, the shows were greeted positively. Supporting act Clive Langer praised the Attractions: "I was amazed by them live. The power. They would just come out of the dressing room and attack." (Note: Langer later produced Costello's records Punch the Clock (1983) and Goodbye Cruel World (1984) with Alan Winstanley.) Due to his alcohol and drug abuse, Costello himself suffered several moments of instability during the shows, including forgetting lyrics, freezing in place and poor vocals. "High Fidelity" was issued on 12" vinyl as the second single from Get Happy!! three days later and reached the UK top 30. The band were back on the road throughout Europe in mid-April, although a car accident resulted in Nieve being temporarily replaced by the Rumour's guitarist Martin Belmont. For these shows, the setlists were revised and featured almost no tracks from Get Happy!!, save for recent single "High Fidelity". In June, "New Amsterdam" was released as an EP of the same name with bonus tracks Costello had recorded alone, including "Just a Memory", "Ghost Train" and "Dr. Luther's Assistant". "New Amsterdam" was also issued a single, backed by "Dr. Luther's Assistant", the same month.

Aided by rising expectations and coverage on soul stations, Get Happy!! reached number two on the UK Albums Chart and number 11 on the US Billboard Top LPs & Tape chart, although it sold less copies than Armed Forces and was viewed as a commercial disappointment. According to Thomson, reasons for its lesser performance possibly included the incident with Stills, Costello's decision not to tour in America due to the incident, lack of promotion from Columbia and radio stations disliking the change in musical direction and less pop-friendly tunes compared to Armed Forces. The promotional campaign included over 100,000 free posters, over 500 record store window displays, magazine adverts and radio and television ads, which proved fraught for financially struggling F-Beat Records. Lauder later admitted: "We had overpressed on the album based on the sales of Armed Forces, which was a platinum album. We had a situation where we were shipping out lots of records and they were all coming back. Having paid for all the advertising and all the publicity, financially it was a tough one to make."

== Critical reception ==
Professional ratings
Initial reviews
Review scores
Source	Rating
Record Mirror	5/5 stars
Smash Hits	7/10
Sounds	5/5 stars

While not receiving the acclaim of its three predecessors, Get Happy!! received generally positive reviews from music critics on release. Many commented on the amount of tracks present on the LP, finding they varied in quality. Hilburn said that "by including 20 tunes in the LP, [Costello] demonstrated his disregard for critics and businessmen". Conversely, Ira Robbins of Trouser Press argued that with a condensed track listing, Get Happy!! would have been "incredible", but as it stands, "bad items detract from good ones". Robert Christgau of The Village Voice acknowledged the presence of "lotsa duds", but observed some memorable "tropes and hooks". Several critics also complained of "uneven" material that lacked a consistent theme and criticised the production as generally weaker than Armed Forces. Rolling Stone's Tom Carson felt that "if the new album is hard to get into, it's also difficult to ignore", concluding that Costello has "succeeded in making his obsessions belong to us. For better or worse, we'll all ride them out together to the end".

Other critics offered high praise towards Get Happy!!, with Creem's Jeff Nesin proclaiming: "If you care about rock 'n' roll you must have this album." In The New York Times, Robert Palmer deemed Get Happy!! Costello's most satisfying work up that point, commenting on the "stylistic range, emotional depth, melodic richness and verbal invention" inside strong songwriting. Joel Selvin of the San Francisco Chronicle also placed it among the artist's best work, highlighting the "distinctive" songwriting and Lowe's production, which he felt created a "sense of being both precise and off-hand". Sounds magazine's Dave McCullough was highly positive, writing that the album "soars to a pinnacle of Costello's combined creative force, by the end leaving the listener quite breathless." Paul Ramble was also positive in NME, drawing positive comparisons to Armed Forces and announcing: "It's a record you didn't expect. It looks like fun and it is. Maybe it's only a temporary lapse, but Elvis has gotten off the treadmill and gotten happy. Get it."

Other reviewers praised Costello himself as an artist. Billboard magazine found the artist "hasn't lost any of his stunt or verve on this snappy LP", which they predicted would be "a sure bet for AOR radio". Cash Box agreed, deducing: "What can you say about the new wave kingpin except that he gets better with age." The reviewer argued that the amount of tracks on the LP "should make any record buyer happy with the quality and quantity of the material", a sentiment echoed by Hilburn, who deemed Get Happy!! "a vibrant work by someone who both understands rock 'n' roll's history and aggressively seeks to shape its future" the Los Angeles Times. Hilburn felt it was not as "powerfully framed" as Armed Forces, but "still bristle[d] with the independence that has characterized the British rocker's brief but provocative career."

Get Happy!! placed at number two on lists of the best albums of 1980 by NME (behind Joy Division's Closer) and Trouser Press (behind the Clash's London Calling), while the album placed seventh on The Village Voice's annual Pazz & Jop music critics' poll, beating out such better selling releases as Michael Jackson's Off the Wall, Stevie Wonder's Hotter than July and Pete Townshend's Empty Glass.

== Legacy ==
Get Happy!! was a turning point in Costello's career, being the first step away from the angry persona that he had embodied up to that point. He began adding more of himself into the material, including "a bit more tenderness, a bit more regret, because you make mistakes in your life and you have to sing about those as well as the things you're very confident or cocky about." Throughout mid-1980, Costello began writing new songs and revising older, unused ones that reflected this new form of thinking, debuting a few during live performances during the summer. His next album, Trust, was envisioned by the artist as combining the "melodic lushness" of Armed Forces and the "rhythmic drive" of Get Happy!! Gouldstone comments that the album marked the beginning of Costello's "most fruitful period" that yielded the "trilogy of magnificent albums": Get Happy!!, Trust and Imperial Bedroom (1982). (Note: Gouldstone excludes the artist's 1981 album of country covers Almost Blue.) Gallucci summarised:

[Get Happy!!] remains a pivotal work in [Costello's] long career, an assured first step toward even more grandiose experiments to come – from jazz, classical and baroque pop to hip-hop, New Orleans groove and Americana. It's also a great album, an extension of his first three classic LPs that also happens to consciously move away from them and into brave new territory.

=== Retrospective appraisal ===
Professional ratings
Retrospective reviews
Review scores
Source	Rating
AllMusic	5/5 stars
Blender	5/5 stars
Chicago Tribune	4/4 stars
Christgau's Record Guide	B
The Encyclopedia of Popular Music	4/5 stars
Entertainment Weekly	A+
Mojo	5/5 stars
Rolling Stone	4/5 stars
(The New) Rolling Stone Album Guide	4.5/5 stars
Select	4/5
Uncut	5/5 stars

Retrospective reviews have been very positive, and Get Happy!! has since been considered one of Costello's best works. Writing in (The New) Rolling Stone Album Guide, critic Rob Sheffield dubbed it a "tour de force", a sentiment echoed by senior AllMusic editor Stephen Thomas Erlewine, who hailed Get Happy!! as more than a "genre exercise". Finding the inconsistent quality of its tracks part of its overall charm, he ended that the album "bursts with energy and invention, standing as a testament to how Costello, the pop encyclopedia, can reinvent the past in his own image". Chris Jones of BBC Music declared it Costello's finest album and "the greatest coherent statement he ever created" in 2008.

In 2015, Gallucci wrote that the album contains some of the artist's best songs from the period. He continued that despite being dismissed as a novelty during discussions of Costello's works from the 1980s, Get Happy!! "may be his most jubilant LP ever", with all 20 tracks packing "more muscle, hooks, heart and, yes, soul than many of his more acclaimed records that followed." Discussing the album for its 40th anniversary, Nelson described the LP as "a bracing time capsule of a singer-songwriter at the height of his powers and coming apart under pressure", drawing comparisons to the Beatles' "White Album" (1968). She further labelled it "a landmark in maximalist efficiency" that anticipated works by the Minutemen, They Might Be Giants and Aesop Rock, ultimately appraising it as a successful comeback record: "a dizzying display of desperation and talent that remains a fascinating, frantic flare from a sinking ship."

Some commentators highlighted the performances of the Attractions. Deeming Get Happy!! an album of chemistry rather than "individual cameos", Thomson states that the record showed the backing band at "their rawest and roughest", with "little sophistication" from Armed Forces. Nelson agreed, finding their performances stand out with individual styles that become "almost automated", thereby "embroidering Costello's frenzied impulses into supple, insinuating grooves that can seem at times almost oblivious to the man raving over them". Perone notes that Pete Thomas's bass drum is higher in the mix, giving the tracks a "four-on-the-floor style" that differentiates Get Happy!! from other albums Costello made with the Attractions. Writing for Spin magazine, Al Shipley referred to it as "an incredible burst of energy" in which "the Attractions' manic performances and some of Costello's most deranged wordplay give the album a frenetic charge even beyond their other early albums."

Get Happy!! has made appearances on several lists of the best albums of the 1980s, including in 1989 by Rolling Stone at number 11, in 2002 by Pitchfork at number 26, and in 2012 by Slant Magazine at number 68. Additionally, Rolling Stone placed it at number 65 on its list of the best albums of the past 20 years, in 1987. It was also placed at number 298 in the third edition of English writer Colin Larkin's All Time Top 1000 Albums (2000).

== Reissues ==
Get Happy!! was first released on CD through Columbia and Demon Records in January 1986. Its first extended reissue through Demon in the UK and Rykodisc in the US on CD came in April 1994. This reissue presented sides one and two in order of the record itself rather than the LP labels and came with a slew of bonus tracks. Rhino Records reissued the album in 2003 as a two-disc set; disc one contained the original 20-track album and disc two contained additional bonus tracks on top of the Rykodisc ones, one of which was a live version of "High Fidelity" that Costello states was his way of performing in the style of Bowie's 1976 album Station to Station. The album was remastered and reissued by UM^{e} on 6 November 2015, who spread the content across two LPs.

== Track listing ==
All tracks are written by Elvis Costello, unless otherwise noted.

Side one
No.	Title	Length
1.	"Love for Tender"	1:57
2.	"Opportunity"	3:13
3.	"The Imposter"	1:58
4.	"Secondary Modern"	1:58
5.	"King Horse"	3:01
6.	"Possession"	2:03
7.	"Men Called Uncle"	2:17
8.	"Clowntime Is Over"	2:59
9.	"New Amsterdam"	2:12
10.	"High Fidelity"	2:28

Side two
No.	Title	Writer(s)	Length
11.	"I Can't Stand Up for Falling Down"	Homer Banks, Allen Jones	2:06
12.	"Black and White World"		1:56
13.	"5ive Gears in Reverse"		2:38
14.	"B Movie"		2:04
15.	"Motel Matches"		2:30
16.	"Human Touch"		2:30
17.	"Beaten to the Punch"		1:49
18.	"Temptation"		2:33
19.	"I Stand Accused"	Tony Colton, Ray Smith	2:21
20.	"Riot Act"		3:35

Extended Play (Rykodisc reissue bonus tracks)
No.	Title	Writer(s)	Length
21.	"Girls Talk"		1:56
22.	"Clowntime Is Over No. 2" (Remix – Guy Bidmead)		3:46
23.	"Getting Mighty Crowded" (Remix – Guy Bidmead)	Van McCoy	2:09
24.	"So Young"	Joe Camilleri, Tony Faehse, Jeff Burstin	3:28
25.	"Just A Memory" (Engineer – Guy Bidmead)		2:17
26.	"Hoover Factory" (Engineer – Paul "Bassman" Riley)		1:45
27.	"Ghost Train" (Engineer – Paul "Bassman" Riley)		3:07
28.	"Dr. Luther's Assistant" (Engineer – Paul "Bassman" Riley)		3:28
29.	"Black & White World" (Demo version)		1:53
30.	"Riot Act" (Demo version)		2:50
31.	"Love for Tender" (Demo version)		1:39

2003 Rhino Records rerelease Bonus Disc
No.	Title	Writer(s)	Length
1.	"I Stand Accused" (Alternate Version)		3:10
2.	"So Young"	Jeff Burstin, Joe Camilleri, Tony Faehse	3:28
3.	"Girls Talk"		1:56
4.	"Human Touch" (Alternate Version)		2:20
5.	"Temptation" (Alternate Version)		2:28
6.	"Motel Matches" (Alternate Take)		2:27
7.	"Clowntime Is Over No. 2" (Remix – Guy Bidmead)		3:46
8.	"B Movie" (Alternate Version)		2:26
9.	"Girls Talk" (Alternate Version)		2:03
10.	"Getting Mighty Crowded" (Remix – Guy Bidmead)	Van McCoy	2:09
11.	"From a Whisper to A Scream" (Alternate Version, Engineer – Paul "Bassman" Riley)		2:30
12.	"Watch Your Step" (Alternate Version, Engineer – Paul "Bassman" Riley)		2:02
13.	"Dr. Luther's Assistant" (Engineer – Paul "Bassman" Riley)		3:28
14.	"Ghost Train" (Engineer – Paul "Bassman" Riley)		3:07
15.	"New Lace Sleeves" (Alternate Version, Engineer – Paul "Bassman" Riley)		3:47
16.	"Hoover Factory" (Engineer – Paul "Bassman" Riley)		1:45
17.	"Just A Memory" (Engineer – Guy Bidmead)		2:17
18.	"I Can't Stand Up For Falling Down" (Alternate Version, Producer – Geoff Emerick)		2:45
19.	"New Amsterdam" (Alternate Version)		2:31
20.	"Black & White World" (Demo)		1:51
21.	"Riot Act" (Demo)		2:50
22.	"Five Gears in Reverse" (Demo)		2:33
23.	"Love for Tender" (Demo)		2:07
24.	"Men Called Uncle" (Demo)		2:06
25.	"King Horse" (Demo)		2:45
26.	"Seven O'Clock" (Demo)		2:00
27.	"High Fidelity" (Live)		3:17
28.	"Opportunity" (Live)		2:33
29.	"The Imposter" (Live)		2:11
30.	"Don't Look Back" (Live)	Ronnie White, Smokey Robinson	4:41

== Personnel ==
According to the 1994 reissue liner notes:

- Elvis Costello – vocals, guitar, organ on "Possession", all instruments on "New Amsterdam"
- Steve Nieve – piano, organ
- Bruce Thomas – bass, harmonica on "I Stand Accused"
- Pete Thomas – drums

Technical

- Nick Lowe – producer
- Roger Béchirian – engineer
- Barney Bubbles as VAT 245 4945 42 – artwork
- Keith Morris as VAT 239 7568 14 – photography

== Charts ==
=== Weekly charts ===
Weekly chart performance for Get Happy!!
Chart (1980)	Peak Position
Australian Albums (Kent Music Report)	25
Canadian Albums (RPM)	24
Dutch Albums (MegaCharts)	34
New Zealand Albums (RIANZ)	9
Norwegian Albums (VG-lista)	11
Swedish Albums (Sverigetopplistan)	6
UK Albums Chart	2
US Billboard Top LPs & Tape	11

=== Certifications ===
Sales certifications for Get Happy!!
Region	Certification	Certified units/sales
Canada (Music Canada)	Gold	50,000^{^}
United Kingdom (BPI)	Gold	100,000^{^}
^{^} Shipments figures based on certification alone.
