= Oliver's Army =

1979 single by Elvis Costello

Single by Elvis Costello and the Attractions

from the album Armed Forces
- B-side: "My Funny Valentine"
- Released: 2 February 1979
- Recorded: August–September 1978
- Studio: Eden, London
- Genre: New wave; pop
- Length: 2:58
- Label: Radar
- Songwriter: Elvis Costello
- Producer: Nick Lowe

Elvis Costello and the Attractions singles chronology
"Radio Radio" (1978)	"Oliver's Army" (1979)	"Accidents Will Happen" (1979)

"Oliver's Army" is a song written by English musician Elvis Costello and performed by Costello and the Attractions, from the former's third studio album Armed Forces (1979). The song is a new wave track that was lyrically inspired by the Troubles in Northern Ireland and includes lyrics critical of the socio-economic components of war. Costello had travelled to Northern Ireland and was influenced by sights of British soldiers patrolling Belfast. Musically, the song features a glossy production and a keyboard performance inspired by ABBA, creating a contrast between the lyrics and music that both critics and Costello have pointed out.

Released as the first single from Armed Forces, "Oliver's Army" was Costello's most successful single in the United Kingdom, spending three weeks at number two on the UK Singles Chart and remaining on the chart for 12 weeks. The song also charted in New Zealand, the Netherlands, Ireland and Australia, and it spawned the follow-up single "Accidents Will Happen", which reached the top 30 in the UK.

"Oliver's Army" has since been recognised by writers as one of the highlights of Armed Forces and has received critical acclaim for its melody, production, and lyrics. The song has appeared on numerous rankings of Costello's great songs as well as on multiple compilation albums. It has been covered by multiple artists, including Blur.

== Background ==
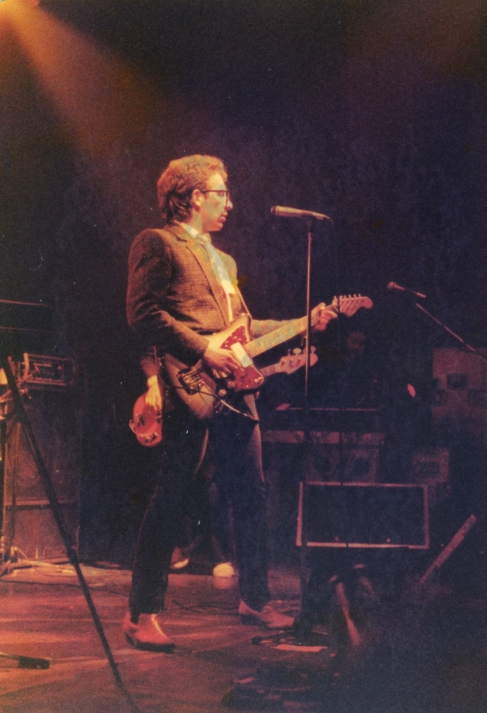
Elvis Costello wrote "Oliver's Army" about the Troubles.

Costello wrote "Oliver's Army" as a comment on the Troubles in Northern Ireland during the 1970s. He was inspired to write the song after seeing British soldiers patrolling the streets of Belfast. He stated, "I made my first trip to Belfast in 1978 and saw mere boys walking around in battle dress with automatic weapons. They were no longer just on the evening news. These snapshot experiences exploded into visions of mercenaries and imperial armies around the world. The song was based on the premise 'they always get a working class boy to do the killing'". Costello's family was of Northern Irish descent; his father, Ross McManus, recalled, "'Oliver's Army' is an important track for me... My grandfather was an Ulster Catholic, and as a child, I lived in an area where bigotry was rife". Costello's grandfather, Pat McManus, had served in the British Army during World War I and the Easter Rising.

According to Sound on Sound, the title "Oliver" refers to English statesman Oliver Cromwell, who led a Parliamentarian army which conquered Ireland in 1649. In addition to the Troubles, the song references other "imperialist battles" in Hong Kong, Palestine and South Africa. However, Costello later explained that the song was not intended to be a comprehensive political piece; he said "It wasn't supposed to read like a coherent political argument. It was pop music". He also pointed out that the opening lyrics "argued the absurdity of even trying to write about such a complex subject".

The song lyrics contain the phrase "white nigger", a racial slur which usually remains uncensored on radio stations. The usage of the phrase came under scrutiny, particularly after Costello used racial slurs during a drunken argument with Stephen Stills and Bonnie Bramlett in 1979. (Note: Melody Maker's Tony Rayns, in an otherwise positive review of Armed Forces, wrote "At best it's feeble, at worst it's offensive".) The same year, Costello's father published a letter in Rolling Stone defending his son against accusations of racism, stating "Nothing could be further from the truth. My own background has meant that I am passionately opposed to any form of prejudice based on religion or race...His mother comes from the tough multiracial area of Liverpool, and I think she would still beat the tar out of him if his orthodoxy were in doubt".

In March 2013, the radio station BBC Radio 6 Music played the song with the phrase removed, despite BBC radio stations having played the song uncensored for over 30 years. (Note: Broadcast regulator Tony Close said that "words targeting particular communities had become of 'greater concern'" in recent years.) This decision attracted public criticism, with critics citing the intended anti-racist and anti-war theme of the single. In January 2022, Costello said that he would no longer be performing the song and asked that radio stations no longer play it. In an interview on Australian radio around the same time, Costello clarified he did not specifically ask radio stations to stop playing the song, but he did state that the way some radio stations edited or bleeped the phrase called attention to the phrase without engaging the context in which it was written. Costello resumed playing an updated version of the song as part of his 2024 tour.

== Music ==
Dubbed "a 45 that radio could hardly refuse" by AllMusic's Mark Deming, "Oliver's Army" is a new wave song with a radio-friendly arrangement that has been described as "glossy". Deming noted the "pop-friendly production" and Costello's "almost jubilant-sounding vocal [distinct] from the traditionally dour (or threatening) Costello, who even embellished himself with some tight vocal harmony overdubs". The song was noted for keyboardist Steve Nieve's "buoyant" piano part, which was inspired by ABBA's 1976 hit single "Dancing Queen". Nieve has explicitly acknowledged the influence.

Many critics have made note of the juxtaposition between the song's music and lyrics; Jim Beviglia of American Songwriter said that "'Oliver's Army' heap[s] bucketfuls of the sweet stuff all over the instrumental arrangement to make sure his acerbic lyrics would get the audience they deserved", while Deming described the song as part of Costello's "most pungently political set of songs up to that time, but wrapped them in catchy melodies...that gave Elvis the Menace a real chance at cracking the singles charts in America". Janet Maslin of Rolling Stone, summarizing the song's multiple dimensions, wrote, "You can hear it one way, or the other way, or both. Elvis Costello doesn't seem to give a damn what you do, and that’s no small part of his charm".

Costello later said "I don't think [the song's] success was because of the lyrics. I always liked the idea of a bright pop tune that you could be singing along to for ages before you realize what it is you're actually singing. Of course, the downside of that is some people only hear the tune and never listen to the words. After a while, I got frustrated at that".

== Release ==
"Oliver's Army" became our biggest hit single, stalling at number two on the charts while records by Blondie, Boney M., and the Bee Gees all overtook us at the top of the hit parade. I thought briefly about changing my name again to something beginning with a B.

— Elvis Costello

"Oliver's Army" was first performed at the 1978 Roskilde Festival. At the time, the song was not seen as a potential hit. Bassist Bruce Thomas later said, "I wasn't particularly aware that that was going to be our anthemic song...It's hard to tell". Costello expected that the song would be used as a B-side. According to Costello, he was "about to scrap" the track until producer Nick Lowe convinced him to finish recording the song. However, the song was completed to be released on Costello's Armed Forces (1979).

"Oliver's Army" was released as the debut single from Armed Forces on 2 February 1979, backed with Costello's rendition of the 1937 show-tune "My Funny Valentine". (Note: Costello had grown up with Frank Sinatra's 1953 version of "My Funny Valentine". Later the same month it was released as the B-side to Costello's rendition of "(What's So Funny 'Bout) Peace, Love, and Understanding", given out free at a Valentine's Day concert, before finding an LP release with the 1980 compilation Taking Liberties.) The single became a commercial hit in the UK, reaching number two over a chart stay of 12 weeks, and remains Costello's most successful UK single release. Costello never reached number one in the UK. "Oliver's Army" was also a hit in other countries, reaching number 4 in Ireland, number 24 in Australia, and number 25 in New Zealand. However, the song failed to chart in the United States despite radio airplay and the success of Armed Forces in the U.S. The follow-up single "Accidents Will Happen" also saw commercial success, charting at number 28 in the United Kingdom.

A music video for "Oliver's Army" directed by Chuck Statler was released to accompany the song. Filmed in Hawaii while Costello and the Attractions were on tour, the video was shot at 4:00 a.m. in a strip club after the band could not find another location. It aired on MTV's first US broadcast day on 1 August 1981.

As a result of the huge success of the single, Costello felt insecure about the relationship he had with his audience, particularly those who only recognised "Oliver's Army". He said, "I saw people responding without any kind of understanding or consideration. We'd play a set where we'd play brilliantly all night and then we'd do our hit single and people would go crazy. Yet they would be bewildered by the rest of what we were doing".

"Oliver's Army" has since been released on multiple compilation albums, including The Best of Elvis Costello and the Attractions, Girls Girls Girls, and The Very Best of Elvis Costello.

== Critical reception ==
"Oliver's Army" has attracted positive reviews from music critics. In 1979, Geoffrey Himes of The Washington Post praised the "compressed drama" of "Oliver's Army", along with all the other tracks on Armed Forces, and highlighted the song's lyrics, despite calling it "almost a direct steal from Spector's hit with the Ronettes, 'Baby, I Love You'". Maslin called the track the "pièce de résistance" of Armed Forces and praised the contrast between the song's music and lyrics. Douglas Wolk of Blender Magazine named the song as one of the key tracks from Armed Forces to download, while Matt LeMay of Pitchfork Media called the song "stunning". Author Graeme Thomson called the track the "pinnacle of Elvis' ability to be all things to all people" and praised the way Costello "melded serious lyrics to insanely catchy pop".

The song has since been rated in numerous rankings as one of Costello's better songs. The Daily Telegraph's Martin Chilton ranked the song number one on his top 40 list of best Costello songs, calling it a "catchy tune with powerful lyrics". Jeremy Allen of The Guardian named the song one of the 10 best Elvis Costello songs, describing the song as "so smart and subversive that many were unaware it was a protest song at all" and comparing it positively against Costello’s eventual writing partner Paul McCartney's 1971 protest song "Give Ireland Back to the Irish". Ryan J. Prado of Paste ranked the song Costello's ninth best and said that "the song is great no matter how thinly you spread its political agendas". Beviglia named the song Costello's 12th best, and Brian Hyatt of Entertainment Weekly named it one of his top 10 Costello songs. The Redditch Standard named it Costello's top song.

== Live performances ==
For most of Costello's career — until a break in January 2022, when he announced his decision to stop performing the song — "Oliver's Army" remained a mainstay of his live setlist; Thomson described the song as an "old crowd pleaser". Shortly after its release, Costello and the Attractions performed the song on television programmes for promotion. In a piece for The Guardian, Costello mocked his dress from a performance of the song on the Kenny Everett Video Show, recalling "During my 'Pop Star Period: 1978–79' I was a fashion disaster of checkerboard eyestrain. I wore powder-blue and pink suits, turquoise lamé jackets and pointy red leather Chelsea boots, but I usually appeared pretty glassy-eyed and shiny under the hot studio lights. No wonder the girls all swooned". Referencing his performance of "Oliver's Army" on Top of the Pops, Costello sardonically wrote, "Checkerboard jacket alert..."

Costello performed "Oliver's Army", along with other political songs, as part of a 9 March 1984 protest concert against Margaret Thatcher during the 1984–85 mining strike. "Oliver's Army" was also performed at the 2013 Glastonbury Festival.

== Personnel ==
- Elvis Costello – guitar, vocals
- Steve Nieve – piano, organ, synthesizer
- Bruce Thomas – bass
- Pete Thomas – drums

Personnel per Armed Forces liner notes.

== Charts ==
=== Weekly charts ===
Chart (1979)	Peak position
Australia (Kent Music Report)	24
Ireland (IRMA)	4
Netherlands (Dutch Top 40)	31
Netherlands (Single Top 100)	32
New Zealand (Listener)	25
UK Singles (Official Charts)	2

=== Year-end charts ===
Chart (1979)	Rank
UK Singles (Music Week)	14

== Cover versions ==
Britpop band Blur recorded a version of the song for Peace Together, a compilation album released in 1993 to promote peace in Northern Ireland. OK Go released a cover on their 2014 rarity album The Compleat 12 Months of (Rare, Unreleased) OK Go, while Cannon and Ball released a version on their 1980 album Rock On Tommy. Comedian Frank Skinner performed the song when he impersonated Costello on a celebrity edition of Stars in Their Eyes in 1999, the mention of "nigger" replaced with "figure". Belle and Sebastian performed a live version of the song at a 2005 concert in Perth.

"Oliver's Army" has been performed by the original version's producer Nick Lowe, who sang the song at an event at the Great American Music Hall in 2010. The performance was part of an event titled "Costello Sings Lowe, Nick Sings Elvis – A Rare Bashing of Each Other's Songs", where Lowe and Costello performed each other's songs.
