= Armed Forces (album) =

- UK release

Studio album by Elvis Costello and the Attractions
- Released: 5 January 1979
- Recorded: August–September 1978
- Studio: Eden (London)
- Genres: New wave; post-punk
- Length: 40:05
- Labels: Radar; Columbia
- Producer: Nick Lowe

Elvis Costello and the Attractions chronology
This Year's Model (1978)	Armed Forces (1979)	Get Happy!! (1980)

Singles from Armed Forces
- 1. "Oliver's Army" Released: 2 February 1979; 2. "Accidents Will Happen" Released: 4 May 1979

Alternative cover
- US release

Armed Forces is the third studio album by the English singer-songwriter Elvis Costello, released on 5 January 1979 in the United Kingdom through Radar Records. It was his second album with the Attractions—keyboardist Steve Nieve, bassist Bruce Thomas and drummer Pete Thomas (no relation)—and the first to officially credit them on the cover. The album was recorded in six weeks from August to September 1978 in London under the working title Emotional Fascism. Produced by Nick Lowe and engineered by Roger Béchirian, the sessions saw Costello exert more control over production compared to This Year's Model, while Nieve contributed more to song arrangements.

For Armed Forces, Costello sought a more commercial sound than the punk rock style employed on his two previous records, resulting in a more pop-oriented production reflecting the new wave era. The overtly political lyrics concern the effect of politics on human relationships. The UK release featured an elaborate fold-out LP packaging, with a cover depicting a herd of elephants; it was simplified for the US release through Columbia Records, featuring an alternate drip-cover.

Supported by the successful UK singles "Oliver's Army" and "Accidents Will Happen", Armed Forces reached number two in the UK, becoming Costello's biggest commercial success up to that point. The American version, released in February 1979, omitted "Sunday's Best" and replaced it with Costello's version of Lowe's "(What's So Funny 'Bout) Peace, Love, and Understanding". The album received positive reviews from music critics and appeared on several lists of the year's best albums. Costello and the Attractions supported the album on the Armed Funk tour in America.

In later decades, Armed Forces has continued to receive positive reviews, with many highlighting the production. Others noted that it contained musical styles Costello would utilise for later records. It is considered one of Costello's best works and has appeared on various best-of lists. The album has been reissued multiple times, including in 2020 as a super deluxe edition, which was positively received.

== Background and recording ==
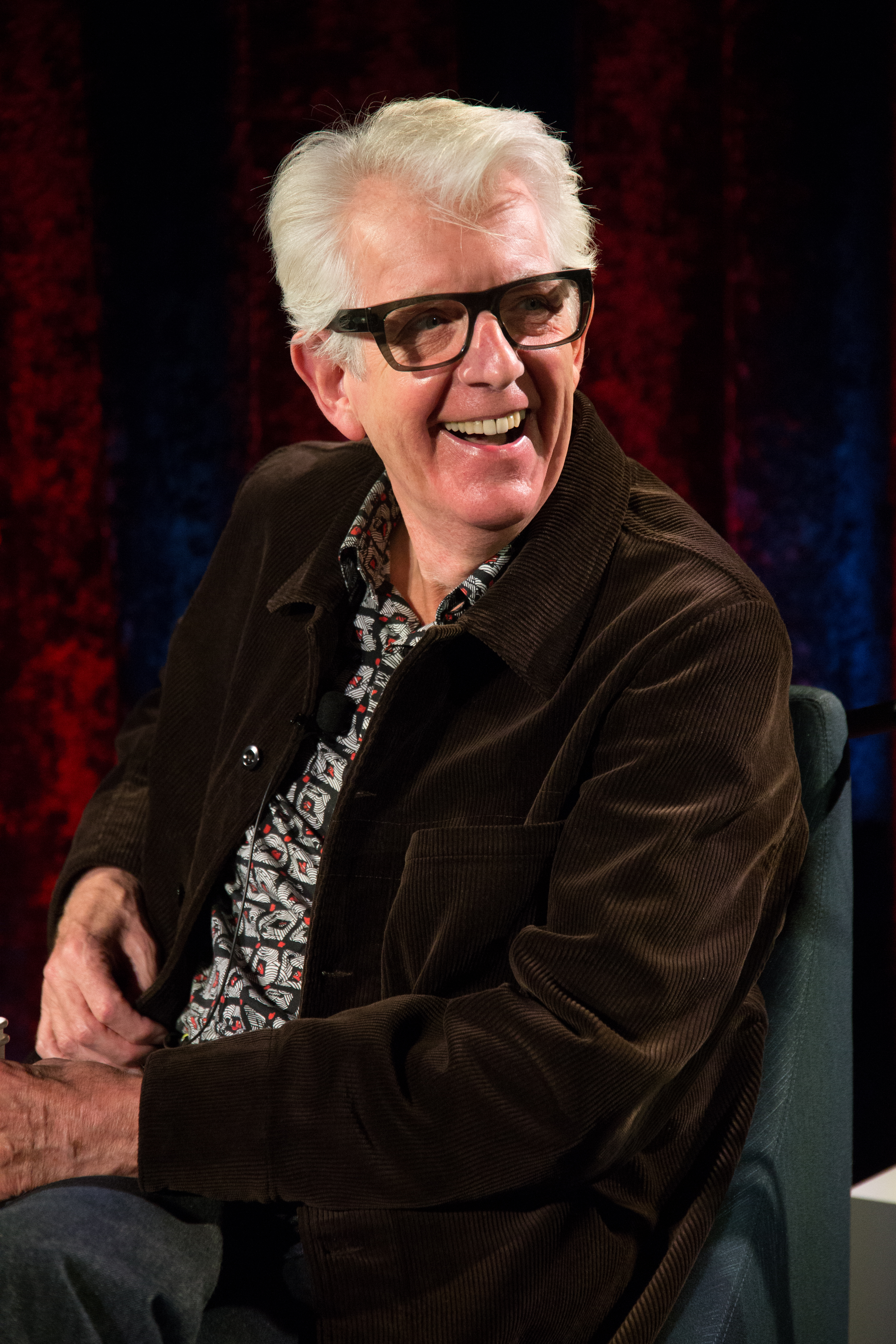
Armed Forces was the third of five consecutively produced Costello albums by Nick Lowe (pictured in 2017).

Elvis Costello's second studio album This Year's Model (1978) was his first with the backing band the Attractions–bassist Bruce Thomas, drummer Pete Thomas (no relation) and keyboardist Steve Nieve, after using the American band Clover for his debut album My Aim Is True (1977). From mid-July to mid-December 1977, Costello and the Attractions underwent a rigorous touring schedule before taking a break to record This Year's Model. Another gruesome touring schedule followed throughout 1978, which contributed to growing exhaustion for the artist and band. Nevertheless, Costello continued writing new material; songs that would appear on Armed Forces began appearing in the setlists starting in May. In July, Costello recorded his song "Stranger in the House" with country artist George Jones, which appeared on the latter's My Very Special Guests album in 1979, after which the former began recording Armed Forces.

Under the working titles Cornered On Plastic and Emotional Fascism, Armed Forces was recorded at London's Eden Studios starting in August 1978 and lasted six weeks. (Note: Bruno puts the recording between 5 August and 23 September 1978.) Returning from This Year's Model were musician Nick Lowe as producer and Roger Béchirian as engineer. Costello's work ethic during the sessions was strong. His on-again/off-again romantic partner at the time Bebe Buell recalled: "Elvis wasn't the kind of guy who slept all day. He got up and went to the studio to record and rehearse. He was a working boy, not a loller." Unlike the previous album sessions, he asserted himself as the final decision maker on all takes, production and mixes. He later admitted: "By the third [album] I thought I was God's gift. I was totally convinced. I had no doubts."

Despite tensions present, Lowe remained instrumental in keeping high morale and orchestration. He was also responsible for incorporating the new sounds Costello wanted for the record. Béchirian later explained: "The whole way those things were directed and put together was very much down to Nick. Nick had a real pop sensibility about him." For his process, Lowe had the band record backing tracks first before commencing on overdubs. Regarding band dynamics, Costello contended that he and the Attractions reached a level of musical agreement that would never be matched again. Nieve, in particular, was more involved in the song arrangements, particularly on "Oliver's Army". Also recorded was a cover of Lowe's "(What's So Funny 'Bout) Peace, Love, and Understanding", originally released by his band Brinsley Schwarz on The New Favourites of... Brinsley Schwarz (1974). The new version was prepared for release as a B-side for Lowe's upcoming single "American Squirm", released in November 1978; the band were credited as "Nick Lowe and His Sound". Recording wrapped in September, after which Costello and the Attractions continued live performances.

== Music and lyrics ==
Armed Forces is a very modern record of its time – self-consciously modernist. We borrowed sounds from some records that we listened to constantly, almost obsessively, at the time. We were into strange behavior! [...] We'd be driving through the Appalachians listened to some ghastly synthesiser music made in Berlin. It was bound to mess you up. The reference points were bound to get unglued. In the end, we got terribly arrogant and confident, and that's why the record sounds like that.

— Elvis Costello, Record Collector, 1995

After having achieved relative commercial success with My Aim Is True and This Year's Model, Costello decided to take Armed Forces in his most commercial direction yet, stating in a 1982 interview that he was selling out modestly-sized venues but received little success with singles compared to artists such as the Bee Gees and Fleetwood Mac. As such, Armed Forces marked a departure from the punk rock of its two predecessors to become, according to the biographer David Gouldstone, Costello's most pop-oriented album up to that point. Joe Marchese of The Second Disc retrospectively noted that Costello embraced the new wave sound of the era, working with Lowe and Béchirian to create a "more intricate" sound compared to its predecessors, while still "immediate and direct in its power and aggression". Spin and Ultimate Classic Rock later identified the album's sound as new wave and post-punk, respectively. Writer Greil Marcus noted that compared to its two predecessors, the sound of Armed Forces is "suppressed, claustrophobic, [and] twitching". Lowe's production, which some compared to the Wall of Sound-style of Phil Spector, utilised the studio to greater effect, creating a grander production overall, particularly on tracks such as "Accidents Will Happen", "Chemistry Class" and "Party Girl".

Costello also used a variety of influences when crafting the sound he wanted for Armed Forces. He stated in an interview that while on the road during tours, he and the Attractions listened to the 1976–77 works of David Bowie (Station to Station, Low and "Heroes") and Iggy Pop (The Idiot, Lust for Life), Kraftwerk (Autobahn), the 1969 works of the Beatles (Abbey Road and Yellow Submarine), as well as ABBA (Greatest Hits). Reviewing in 2002, Mojo's Mat Snow found a cross between Abbey Road and Bob Dylan's Highway 61 Revisited (1965). ABBA influenced Nieve's keyboard part for "Oliver's Army" and due to his greater contributions to the arrangements, his keyboards are more prominent throughout the entire album, predominantly on "Green Shirt" and "Party Girl". Béchirian later downplayed the numerous influences, stating that "a lot of that was just in the air".

While its two predecessors dealt with issues of immediate concern to the narrators, Armed Forces focuses on bigger issues on a broader scale. Marcus described it as a political album, or "a set of songs about how we live out the politics of our age whether we want to, mean to, or not". He specifically writes that on the album, "every moment of personal failure or unsatisfied passion is invaded by the cruelty and shamelessness of the political world." Indeed, Gouldstone identifies tracks that reflect political themes include "Senior Service", "Oliver's Army", "Goon Squad" and "Sunday's Best". Writing for PopMatters, Zeth Lundy described the album as "a collection of musings on human nature and relationships, bolstered by the pervasive military metaphors". The interplay is reflected by the album's working title Emotional Fascism. Although he had previously displayed fascist themes in tracks such as "Less Than Zero", "Night Rally" and "Radio Radio", Costello references fascist ideals frequently on Armed Forces, from Nazis to the Holocaust. Like its two predecessors, Graeme Thomson finds that Costello uses his signature wordplay on the album to great effect, composing various puns, double entendres, double-bluffs and non-sequiturs.

=== Side one ===
The opening track, "Accidents Will Happen", is a non-political pop song that reflects the complexities of human relationships. Labelled by Hinton as a cross between the Byrds and the Beatles, it is addressed to Buell-type figure, but the actual subject is Costello himself, referring to his newfound sexual possibilities after achieving fame. NME's Charles Shaar Murray described it as "an ornate, melodic and exquisitely danceable pop song designed to lull American record executives into a state of false security". The second track, the upbeat "Senior Service", concerns office politics and class warfare. More specifically, the song is about the brutality of big business in striking those down who are too weak to obtain power for themselves. It contains the first reference to the 'armed forces'. Writer Franklin Bruno states that while "Accidents Will Happen" was a showcase for Costello's voice, "Senior Service" "reintroduces" the Attractions and contains a widely different production style from the previous track. Continuing the political theme is "Oliver's Army", which boasts a pop-friendly production and melody over sinister lyrics on military imperialism. According to Gouldstone, the song's narrator is "presumably" a British soldier serving in Northern Ireland. Costello refers to the Irish as "white niggers" and references the conquest of Ireland in 1649 by the English Parliamentarian leader Oliver Cromwell. Musically, Bruno makes comparisons to ABBA's "Dancing Queen" (1976) and the Beach Boys' "Don't Worry Baby" (1964).

Described by Murray as "sexual fascism", "Big Boys" follows a narrator who is split between sympathy and contempt in his infatuation with a woman; he wants to be a 'big boy' and is seen as immature. Gouldstone compares it to "The Beat" from This Year's Model. Bruno states that it is the album's first track on which the mixture of personal and political themes appear as "volatile". "Green Shirt" concerns paranoia and predicts the rise of sex hotlines. It uses three different themes: assault on the media, a woman tidying herself, and images of betrayals to establish a connection between personal behaviour and relationships on a larger scale. Musically, it is primarily led by a loop created on a Minimoog. Regarding the colour green, Bruno interprets it as a possible reference to the members of the Romanian fascist movement Iron Guard. "Party Girl" is a ballad in the vein of "Alison" and "Little Triggers"; away from the new wave of the rest of the album. Reportedly about Buell, Costello denied this in the 2002 Armed Forces reissue liner notes, stating he wrote it for an art student he barely knew. In the song, the narrator pleads for the 'party girl' not to dismiss him even though he knows she has control over him and does not care how long it will take. After multiple political-related tracks, "Party Girl" represented a return to a more personal side.

=== Side two ===
"Goon Squad" builds on the theme of "Oliver's Army" of "underhand recruitment". In the song, a soldier relays messages on his experiences back to his family but by the end, he has lost his hand and fully joined the 'goon squad'. Gouldstone notes that the vague lyrics do not specifically mention the 'goon squad' as being the army–they could be police or big businesses–but the song nevertheless paints them in a poor light. Musically, Costello traced the song back to Don Covay's "It's Better to Have (and Don't Need)", but admitted that "we were too wound up to play it in that fashion". Described by Lundy as "intentionally cavernous and bleak", Gouldstone finds it "near heavy metal", while Hinton compares the intro to Thin Lizzy and the outro to the Beatles' "Tomorrow Never Knows" (1966). "Busy Bodies" is, in Gouldstone's words, a "snappy pop tune" that evokes Roy Orbison's "Pretty Woman", "A Whiter Shade of Pale" and the Beach Boys' "Heroes and Villains" (1967). Like "Pump It Up", it concerns the insignificance of modern life; people spend their lives purchasing superfluous items, sleeping with each other and ultimately amounting to nothing, becoming busy bodies. Originally written for Ian Dury, "Sunday's Best" is a waltz that targets the worst aspects of British life. Gouldstone writes that it shows how ordinary people are "trivial and monotonous". On the song, Costello said that it is "not so much a song as an attack on the small-ads page of The News of the World with a big pair of scissors". It has been musically compared to John Cooper Clarke's "You Never See a Nipple in the Daily Express".

Murray considered "Moods for Moderns" a "charming pastiche of Booker T & the MGs overlaid with an oddly disturbing ghost of a song". Gouldstone finds it "borderline funk", while Bruno compares it to Bowie's "plastic soul" era. Lyrically, the song is about the pain one feels at the end of a relationship, with sinister undertones that reflect moods of disillusionment, alienation and fear. "Chemistry Class" combines the personal and political themes to tell a tale about the natural attraction of two people. One of the last lines references Adolf Hitler's Final Solution as a metaphor for two lovers parting ways. Costello described it as a reaction to the gratification of American college campuses he experienced while on tour in America. Like the previous track, "Two Little Hitlers" captures the album's dual themes of love and politics, fully comparing the disagreements in personal relationships to opposing factions of fascism. According to Hinton, it paints a picture of two long-time lovers, "like beasts engaged in a fight to the death". Musically, it uses Bowie's "Rebel Rebel" (1974) riff and elements of "TVC 15" (1976).

== Packaging ==
=== Title ===
The new album was to be titled Emotional Fascism until the last minute. The author Tony Clayton-Lea contends that Armed Forces, coined by Pete Thomas, continued Costello's theme of "control and domination over both governing and individual bodies". In his memoir, Costello acknowledged changing the title to Armed Forces after knowing radio stations would refuse to play an album titled Emotional Fascism. Although Hinton opined that the titles were "much [of] the same", Murray argued that Emotional Fascism was the superior title, stating: "Armed Forces tells you what institution Mr. Costello has in his gunsights this time around ... but Emotional Fascism tells you what attitude is about to be subjected to both long-and-short-range fire." In the 2002 liner notes for the album, Costello explained: "Two or three half-formed notions collided uneasily in that title, although I never would have admitted to having anything as self-conscious as a 'theme' running through the songs. Any patterns that have emerged did so as the record was completed or with the benefit of hindsight." Bruno contends that the album "embodies a critique" under either title, but also deduces that it "does not present an argument".

=== Artwork ===
The Armed Forces sleeve was very involved. [...] We wanted to make it as impractical and ghastly as possible. There were kitsch elements of pop art in it, of trash art that you can buy from Woolworth's, of postcards that are disposable and you lose them. It was never supposed to live forever, so it's ironic that we've ended up reissuing the thing.

— Costello on the artwork, Record Collector, 1995

The packaging for Armed Forces was designed by Barney Bubbles and featured different cover artworks for the UK and US releases. In the UK, the cover was a painting depicting a herd of elephants in front of mountains, with birds flying overhead and mist overlaying the ground. The lead elephant stares directly at the onlooker, which Gouldstone notes mirrors Costello on the cover of This Year's Model. For the first time, the Attractions received co-artist credit on the sleeve. The artist credit is on top while the album title is on bottom. Initial UK editions boasted an elaborate fold-out sleeve containing four colour postcards of the band. The back cover illustrated art pop geometric patterns, of which emerged various army soldiers and animal prints. The inner sleeve contained two photographs: one showed Costello and the Attractions on a suburban road, while the other featured Costello laying across a swimming pool diving board with a body lying submerged at the bottom, overall surrounded by numerous yellow boxes; the words "my place ... or yours" and "emotional fascism" appeared on the sides. When it was reissued on CD, the album failed to replicate the elaborate fold-out sleeves, instead having the booklet appear in the shape of a cross. Bruno argues that the cover "conveys an unmistakable sense of attack" and is more significant for its statement on Costello's position at that point in his career rather than its actual design.

The US release opted for a more standardised LP packaging. The elephant cover was replaced with the drip-image that was unveiled in the inner sleeve of the UK release. The UK image had various black scribble lines extending into the outer panels that utilised various animal prints. Additionally, the US sleeve moved the elephant cover to the back and reduced it to make room for a track listing and larger rendering of the album title and artist name. Bruno argues that the "modest" cover reflected Costello's lesser status in America. He furthermore associates Bubbles' decision to use the splatter design as a "mocking appropriation" of Roy Lichtenstein's mid-1960s "brushstroke" paintings. A promotional photo taken for the album depicted Costello holding a machine gun barrel down his throat with the words "Don't Join" over him. The first 100,000 pressings of the LP in both the UK and the US included a bonus EP titled Live at Hollywood High, recorded in June 1978, which contained live recordings of "Alison", an extended "Watching the Detectives" and a slower version of "Accidents Will Happen".

== Release and promotion ==
We either make it all the way with Armed Forces or we don't. If this album doesn't break in America, then Columbia will still keep us but we'll be considered pretty much a spent force.

— Jake Riviera, Creem, 1979

"Radio Radio" was issued as a standalone single in October 1978 as a stopgap release between This Year's Model and the still-titled Emotional Fascism, which was scheduled for release in early 1979. The single reached the UK top 30, earning Costello and the Attractions an appearance on BBC's Top of the Pops. From November to December, the band toured Canada, Japan and Australia and filmed promotional videos for "Oliver's Army" and "(What's So Funny 'Bout) Peace, Love, and Understanding". By the start of another British tour at the end of December, the band's growing exhaustion began to affect their performances. Bruce Thomas later admitted: "We were all fried. ... we just didn't get a break. I know what Jake [Riviera] was doing, but I think he pushed it too hard, I think he really did."

Now titled Armed Forces due to a complaint from Columbia/CBS, Radar Records issued the new album in the UK on 5 January 1979, (Note: St. Michael and Hinton give the release date in February 1979.) with the catalogue number RAD 14. The album was Costello's biggest commercial success to date, peaking at number two on the UK Albums Chart, held off the top spot by the disco compilation Don't Walk – Boogie; it remained on the chart for 28 weeks, twice as long as This Year's Model.

For its February 1979 release in the US, Columbia replaced "Sunday's Best" with "(What's So Funny 'Bout) Peace, Love, and Understanding". This release went gold by the end of the year. After garnering significant radio exposure in the UK, "Oliver's Army" was released as a single on 2 February 1979, backed by Costello's solo rendition of the 1937 show-tune "My Funny Valentine". It peaked at number two on the UK Singles Chart in March. "Accidents Will Happen" was issued as a single on 4 May, backed by "Talking in the Dark" and "Wednesday Week", and peaked at number 29 in the UK.

== Critical reception ==
Professional ratings
Initial reviews
Review scores
Source	Rating
Record Mirror	4/5 stars
Smash Hits	8/10
Sounds	4.5/5 stars
The Village Voice	A−

Armed Forces received positive reviews from music critics on release. Murray hailed the record as containing "some of the best rock music we'll hear this year" in NME, while a writer in The Observer cited it as "an album you just can't ignore". The Guardian's Robin Denselow named Armed Forces the "first important album" of the year, and referred to it as musically "Costello's most relaxed, mellow and gentle album yet". In the Los Angeles Times, Robert Hilburn named Armed Forces the best album at mid-year in July 1979. Citing it as Costello's "most compelling" album yet, Hilburn described it as "a feverish, unflinching approach" that is a cross between the "social fury of John Lennon's first two solo albums" and the "haunting dissection of Bob Dylan's choicest works". The Washington Post's Geoffrey Himes also compared Costello's lyrical strategy of placing harsh ideals into more seductive settings with Dylan's break from the folk rock movement in the mid-1960s. In his review of Armed Forces, Himes singled out "Accidents Will Happen" as "the kind of high point that marks a great era of music". The same publication's Eve Zibart described Armed Forces as Costello's "third and most polished album [that] stakes out New Wave's first major fiefdom in the United States".

[Armed Forces is] Costello's most fervent declaration of intention yet for the title of great '70s pop subversive. The only comparisons even worth making are with the Beatles and Bowie, and they scarcely scratch the surface.

— Nick Kent, NME, 1979

Writing for Rolling Stone, Janet Maslin felt the album was a "killer in several senses of the word", remarking on the brief, energetic songs with dense and sometimes overly clever but snappy lyrics. Maslin felt that Costello "wants to be daring, but he also wants to dance". The Village Voice critic Robert Christgau felt Costello was using words to "add color and detail to his music" rather than as "a thinking, feeling person", though he approved of the "intricate pop constructions" and found the album overall to be "good" but not "great". Both reviewers felt that the album was more densely or richly produced than its two predecessors. Other reviewers compared Armed Forces to its two predecessors, including Ira Robbins of Trouser Press, who considered it inferior to the "supercharged bite" of This Year's Model, but nevertheless deemed it a good record in its own right. On the lyrics, Robbins found that they "suffer from an excessive penchant towards cheap puns and pseudo-Spoonerisms". Additionally, in a review titled "Swell El", Record Mirror's Sheila Prophet found the "bitter bite" of its predecessors exchanged for "depth and subtlety and new textures". Tony Rayns of Melody Maker took issue with the use of the terms "nigger" and "darkies" in "Oliver's Army" and "Sunday's Best", respectively, but was overall positive to Costello's improved vocals and songwriting, and the performance of Nieve on keyboards. Sounds magazine's Giovanni Dadomo highlighted "Accidents Will Happen", "Big Boys" and "Green Shirt", while also naming "Goon Squad" "easily the best 'political' song of the last five years".

In The Village Voice's annual Pazz & Jop critics poll for the year's best albums, Armed Forces finished at number five. It also featured on year-end lists by Melody Maker and NME at numbers fourteen and six, respectively.

== Tour and aftermath ==
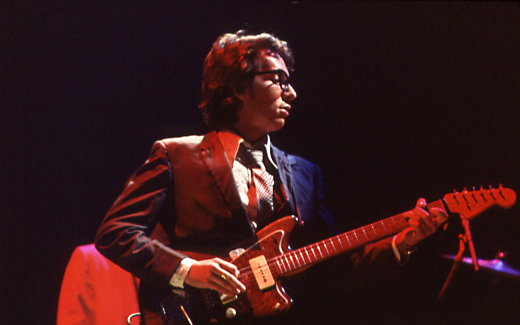
Costello onstage in April 1978

To support the album, Costello and the Attractions embarked on the Armed Funk tour in America, which lasted from February to April. The tour was plagued with issues, including drug and alcohol problems, aggressive behaviour from Riviera and Costello to the press, and poor performances that led to critical and audience backlash. (Note: According to Thomson, Bruce Springsteen was playing three-hour shows around this time, so American audiences were expecting longer shows. When Costello only played sets less than an hour long, he attracted both critical and audience backlash.) In March, a racism-filled exchange between Costello, Stephen Stills, and Stills' then-backing singer Bonnie Bramlett, where the former insulted various American musical artists, was leaked to the public and received additional backlash. Even though Armed Forces had reached the top ten on Billboard's Top LPs & Tape chart during the tour, by April it fell off quickly after boycotts were enacted by American radio stations and listeners. By the tour's end, Costello's reputation in America was nearly destroyed. Bruce Thomas later admitted, "We never really recovered from that tour. Every time Elvis is doing something well, he kind of sabotages it." His reputation in the UK remained largely unaffected, mostly due to newspapers failing to pick up the story. The author Mick St. Michael compared it to the worldwide response from John Lennon's 1966 more popular than Jesus comment.

Following the disastrous tour, Costello decided to reevaluate himself and his career. He ended his relationship with Buell and reconciled with his wife Mary and son Matthew. Apart from the occasional demo, he and the Attractions took some time off over the summer of 1979. Upon reconvening in the studio later in the year, Costello took a more soul-influenced direction for his next album, Get Happy!! (1980). Costello acknowledged the incident in an interview with Rolling Stone in 1982, feeling that it "outweighs my entire career", but later reflected in his 2015 memoir Unfaithful Music & Disappearing Ink: "So what if my career was rolled back off the launching pad? Life eventually became a lot more interesting due to this failure to get into some undeserved and potentially fatal orbit." Although he was not dropped by Columbia, he did not tour America again until 1981 in support of Trust.

== Legacy ==
Hinton argues that Armed Forces marked the end of the angry persona of Costello's early works, although Thomson cites Get Happy!! as the first step away from the persona. Bruno saw the songs on Get Happy!! as a response to the events of the Armed Funk tour. Despite the tour's initial impact on him, his career recovered from the incident. He later reflected: "Some of the highly charged language may now seem a little naive; it is full of gimmicks and almost overpowers some songs with paradoxes and subverted clichés piling up into private and secret meanings. I was not quite 24 and thought I knew it all." Although he continued to reference aggressive and fascist themes in his lyrics, including on his 2020 album Hey Clockface, David A. Graham of The Atlantic argued that "he has never written another record so searing in its combination of romantic and political fury as Armed Forces." Graham further contended that the fascist elements described on Armed Forces were still alive in America during the first presidency of Donald Trump, writing: "More than four decades after its release, Armed Forces feels more frighteningly vital and relevant than ever."

=== Retrospective appraisal ===
Professional ratings
Review scores
Source	Rating
AllMusic	5/5 stars
Blender	5/5 stars
Chicago Tribune	4/4 stars
Encyclopedia of Popular Music	3/5 stars
Entertainment Weekly	A+
Mojo	4/5 stars
Pitchfork	9.5/10
Rolling Stone	4/5 stars
The Rolling Stone Album Guide	4/5 stars
Uncut	3/5 stars

In later decades, Armed Forces has received acclaim as one of Costello's best works. In 1991, Entertainment Weekly's Armond White called the album a "landmark", while Greg Kot of the Chicago Tribune called it "Costello's 'political' record, and also one of his most irresistibly melodic." Reviewing for Rolling Stone in 2002, Gavin Edwards found a record "filled with great rock songs that explore the boundaries between the political and the personal". He further highlighted Costello's wordplay, Nieve's keyboard playing and the inclusion of "(What's So Funny 'Bout) Peace, Love and Understanding?" as the final track. Ultimate Classic Rock's Jeff Giles stated that with the album, Costello achieved a balance between critical and commercial success, creating an album that proves "a smart, sardonic set of pop songs can also be a hit". In PopMatters, Lundy described Armed Forces as "a bold, highly ambitious effort" that represented a "giant leap" from its two "flawless" predecessors. He noted that neither of the earlier records could match Armed Forces' "acidic intellectualism".

Several reviewers commented on the production. In AllMusic, Stephen Thomas Erlewine found a more "detailed and textured pop production" on Armed Forces compared to Costello's first two albums, making the music more accessible, though the lyrics were "more insular and paranoid". Although he felt some of the lyrics were forced, he hailed the music as "demonstrat[ing] the depth of Costello's compositional talents", and named Armed Forces the artist's "third masterpiece in a row". Pitchfork's Matt LeMay described the production as "extravagantly layered with dense instrumentation and rich, effusive textures" that "often serve[s] to conceal, rather than reveal the nuances of Costello's songwriting". He concluded that "the greatest strength of Armed Forces may be the same thing that makes it less viscerally powerful than Costello's two prior records – its songs absolutely demand to be appreciated for their craftsmanship." He further argued that the album marks the point at which Costello found his voice as a songwriter. Paul Sexton of uDiscoverMusic wrote that the production's "crisp and disciplined" delivery kept the material "live and vital" on a record "that enhanced Costello's reputation as an artist with depth behind the vitriol".

Some reviewers noted that the album contained styles that hinted at the artist's later works. AllMusic's Mark Deming highlighted "Accidents Will Happen" as previewing the "stylistic diversity" Costello would incorporate into future works, while Stewart Mason felt that "Party Girl" presaged the soul music he would explore on Get Happy!!, and Bruno cited the keyboards on "Green Shirt" as foreshadowing Imperial Bedroom (1982). Sexton stated that the songs hinted at the artist's future rock and soul directions but nevertheless "sounded entirely cutting-edge at the same time". Lundy also noted that Armed Forces enacted "an eclectic blueprint of restless genre hustling" that Costello continued to utilise throughout his long career.

=== Rankings ===
Armed Forces has appeared on several best-of lists. In 1993, the album placed at number 61 on The Times' 100 Best Albums of All Time list. In 2000, it was voted number 264 in the third edition of English writer Colin Larkin's book All Time Top 1000 Albums (2000). The same year, Q placed Armed Forces at number 45 in its list of the "100 Greatest British Albums Ever". In 2003, the album was ranked number 482 on Rolling Stone's list of the 500 Greatest Albums of All Time, and then was moved to number 475 on an updated list in 2012. NME and Sounds ranked Armed Forces at numbers 89 and 67 in 1985 and 1986, respectively, on lists compiling the 100 greatest albums of all time.

The album was also included in the 2018 edition of Robert Dimery's book 1001 Albums You Must Hear Before You Die.

== Reissues ==
Professional ratings
2020 Super Deluxe Edition
Review scores
Source	Rating
American Songwriter	5/5 stars
Flood Magazine	8/10
Goldmine	5/5 stars

Armed Forces was first released on CD through Columbia and Demon Records in January 1986. Its first extended reissue through Demon in the UK and Rykodisc in the US on CD came in October 1993. The single disc featured the original album as well as bonus tracks, including the addition of "(What's So Funny 'Bout) Peace, Love and Understanding" as the album's closing track. Rhino Records reissued the album in 2002 as a two-disc set; disc one contained the original UK album plus "(What's So Funny 'Bout) Peace, Love and Understanding", and disc two contained bonus tracks.

On 6 November 2020, Armed Forces was reissued as a vinyl-only super deluxe box set. Titled The Complete Armed Forces and issued by UM^{e}, the nine-LP set consists of a 2020 remaster of the original album plus various B-sides, demos, outtakes, unreleased live recordings from the era, and a new set of liner notes written by Costello himself totalling over 10,000 words. The collection was praised by critics for giving an in-depth view of the artist's work during the period.

== Track listing ==
All tracks are written by Elvis Costello

Side one
No.	Title	Length
1.	"Accidents Will Happen"	3:00
2.	"Senior Service"	2:17
3.	"Oliver's Army"	2:58
4.	"Big Boys"	2:54
5.	"Green Shirt"	2:42
6.	"Party Girl"	3:20

Side two
No.	Title	Length
7.	"Goon Squad"	3:14
8.	"Busy Bodies"	3:33
9.	"Sunday's Best"	3:22
10.	"Moods for Moderns"	2:48
11.	"Chemistry Class"	2:55
12.	"Two Little Hitlers"	3:18
Total length:		40:05

Notes

- The American release omitted "Sunday's Best" and added Costello's cover of Lowe's "(What's So Funny 'Bout) Peace, Love, and Understanding" as the side two closer. Following the 1993 reissue, "(What's So Funny 'Bout) Peace, Love, and Understanding" was added as the album's final track.

=== 1993 Rykodisc bonus tracks ===
Extended Play
No.	Title	Writer(s)	Length
14.	"My Funny Valentine" (B-side to "Oliver's Army")	Rodgers and Hart	1:28
15.	"Tiny Steps"		2:42
16.	"Clean Money"		1:57
17.	"Talking in the Dark"		1:56
18.	"Wednesday Week"		2:01
19.	"Accidents Will Happen" (Live)		3:23
20.	"Alison" (Live)		3:06
21.	"Watching the Detectives" (Live)		6:08
Total length:			66:20

=== 2002 Rhino reissue bonus disc ===
No.	Title	Writer(s)	Length
1.	"Tiny Steps"		2:43
2.	"Busy Bodies" (Alternative Version)		3:48
3.	"Talking in the Dark"		1:58
4.	"Big Boys" (Alternative Version)		2:56
5.	"Clean Money" (Backing Vocals – Dave Edmunds, The Attractions)		1:59
6.	"Wednesday Week"		2:06
7.	"My Funny Valentine"	Lorenz Hart, Richard Rodgers	1:33
8.	"Accidents Will Happen" (Live)		3:18
9.	"Mystery Dance" (Live)		2:01
10.	"Goon Squad" (Live)		3:42
11.	"Party Girl" (Live)		3:19
12.	"Stranger in the House" (Live)		3:52
13.	"Alison" (Live)		3:08
14.	"Lipstick Vogue" (Live)		4:26
15.	"Watching the Detectives" (Live)		5:51
16.	"You Belong to Me" (Live)		2:39
17.	"Chemistry Class" (Solo Live)		2:34

== Personnel ==
Credits adapted from AllMusic:

- Elvis Costello – guitar, vocals
- Steve Nieve – keyboards
- Bruce Thomas – bass
- Pete Thomas – drums

Technical

- Nick Lowe – producer
- Roger Béchirian – engineer
- Barney Bubbles – cover artwork

== Charts ==
=== Weekly charts ===
Weekly charts for Armed Forces
Chart (1979)	Peak Position
Australian Albums (Kent Music Report)	9
Canadian Albums (RPM)	8
Dutch Albums (MegaCharts)	13
New Zealand Albums (RIANZ)	9
Norwegian Albums (VG-lista)	12
Swedish Albums (Sverigetopplistan)	11
UK Albums Chart	2
US Billboard Top LPs & Tape	10

=== Year-end charts ===
Year-end charts for Armed Forces
Chart (1979)	Position
Australian Albums (Kent Music Report)	32
Canadian Albums (RPM Year-End)	60
New Zealand Albums (RMNZ)	25
UK Albums Chart	13

== Certifications ==
Sales certifications for Armed Forces
Region	Certification	Certified units/sales
Canada (Music Canada)	Platinum	100,000^{^}
New Zealand (RMNZ)	Gold	7,500^{^}
United Kingdom (BPI)	Platinum	300,000^{^}
United States (RIAA)	Gold	500,000^{^}
^{^} Shipments figures based on certification alone.
