= I Can't Stand Up for Falling Down =

Single by Elvis Costello and the Attractions

from the album Get Happy!!
- B-side: "Girls Talk"
- Released: 8 February 1980
- Recorded: 1979
- Genre: New wave
- Length: 2:05
- Label: F-Beat (UK); Columbia (USA)
- Songwriters: Homer Banks, Allen Jones
- Producer: Nick Lowe

Elvis Costello and the Attractions singles chronology
"Accidents Will Happen" (1979)	"I Can't Stand Up for Falling Down" (1980)	"High Fidelity" (1980)

"I Can't Stand Up for Falling Down" is a song written by Homer Banks and Allen Jones. Originally recorded by soul duo Sam & Dave in 1967, the song was famously covered by new wave musician Elvis Costello with his backing band the Attractions in 1980 for their album Get Happy!!.

== Original version ==
"I Can't Stand Up for Falling Down" was originally recorded by Sam & Dave in 1967, issued as the B-side to their live cover of Sam Cooke's "Soothe Me" (STAX 45-218).

== Elvis Costello and the Attractions version ==
Elvis Costello and the Attractions covered the song in 1980 for the album Get Happy!!. Costello's version was drastically rearranged from the original, turning it from a slow soul ballad into an uptempo Northern soul-style dance track. It was one of three singles taken from the album in the UK. It was supposed to be released on the 2 Tone Records label in the UK, but even though copies were pressed, contractual difficulties eventually halted its release on that label. The single was eventually released on F-Beat Records, which was the charted release. The single was backed by "Girls Talk" a song Costello originally gave to pub rock musician Dave Edmunds before releasing his version.

The Elvis Costello version of the song was a commercial hit in the UK, reaching number four on the charts over a stay of eight weeks. The single also reached number 14 in Ireland. A US version of the single was released as an EP with King Horse & Secondary Modern included on the second side.

=== Music videos ===
A music video for the song was released in 1980, featuring Costello and the Attractions attempting to dance using Motown steps. Costello later said of the video, "We went to one of those proper dance studios with the mirror on the wall and the choreographer was trying to teach us basic Motown backing singer steps. I was drinking and said, 'Well… the lead singer doesn't usually do the moves,' so I did a few steps and left it to the Attractions to do it all. The idea behind those early videos was to make comical little films. Once you started to think, 'I'm remaking The Third Man or Citizen Kane', it lost a little of the charm."

In a piece for The Guardian, Costello recalled a scene from the Top of the Pops video for "I Can't Stand Up for Falling Down", saying, "When I arrived to perform 'I Can't Stand Up for Falling Down' [I] was met by what looked like a circus strongman holding a length of stout rope. Our promo man, Spanner, gently persuaded me to don a pantomime harness so I could be hoisted up on a wire and down again, right on cue with the title line from the chorus. ... Two things stood in the way. One was the holes the hooks of the harness would have to punch in my favourite thrift-store trousers, and the other was my fear of heights. A trip to the BBC club took care of the latter: by the time I returned to perform, I wouldn't have cared if I'd been asked to wear harem pants or Bermuda shorts. I was a rubber man, so when the harness returned me to earth, my legs buckled under me. I suspect that the cameraman was already doubled up with laughter, as he completely bungled the shot".

=== Charts ===
Chart (1980)	Peak position
Ireland (IRMA)	14
UK Singles (Official Charts)	4
