= Accidents Will Happen (song) =

- Cover of U.K. sleeve (printed on the inside rather than outside as a reference to the song)

Single by Elvis Costello and the Attractions

from the album Armed Forces
- B-side: "Talking in the Dark" "Wednesday Week"
- Released: 4 May 1979
- Recorded: August–September 1978
- Genre: New wave
- Length: 3:00
- Label: Radar
- Songwriter: Elvis Costello
- Producer: Nick Lowe

Elvis Costello and the Attractions singles chronology
"Oliver's Army" (1979)	"Accidents Will Happen" (1979)	"I Can't Stand Up for Falling Down" (1980)

"Accidents Will Happen" is a song written by Elvis Costello and performed by Elvis Costello and the Attractions. It first appeared on the 1979 album Armed Forces. Costello wrote the song about his many infidelities during this period of his life, including an encounter Costello had with a taxi driver in Tucson, Arizona. The song originally featured a piano-centered arrangement and was inspired by songs such as "Anyone Who Had a Heart" and "Walk Away Renée".

The song was a moderate hit in the UK when released as the second single from Armed Forces, reaching the Top 30 in the UK. It was accompanied by an animated music video that has since received acclaim and is widely considered to be the first fully animated music video. The song has been praised by critics and has appeared on numerous compilation and live albums.

== Background ==
Costello wrote this song in 1978 and debuted it at a performance at Hollywood High School on June 4, 1978, accompanied only by Steve Nieve on piano.

In his 2015 memoir Unfaithful Music & Disappearing Ink, Costello gave an account of the inspiration for this song that he would later admit was somewhat fictionalized. He claimed to have written it while on tour in the southwestern US, after an awkward tryst with a female taxi driver at her home in Tucson, Arizona. Afterward, the woman dropped him off at his hotel, where, feeling a "dull, guilty regret" and overhearing another couple having sex in the adjacent hotel room, he was inspired to write the song.

In 2020, Costello said that the taxi driver story was not the sole inspiration, stating, "I needed to construct a single episode in print to stand in for the truth." He said the song was a more general account of his "failings during that time as a husband and as a father," concluding, "Back in '78, I was young and newly famous, and I didn't have any sense of responsibility. Temptation came along, and I gave in to it more than I should have. That's what this song is really about." He said of this time in his life:

From my perspective, I had gone from being an outsider and not very social to being aware of people looking at me because I was on a record cover. There were girls taking an interest because I was somebody they'd heard of. There was all of that conundrum in the verse. I think in a weird way, there's a kind of innocence in there or inexperience. I see that now. Of course, all of these things I didn't see when I was writing it.

== Music and lyrics ==
On a lyrical level, Costello has described the song as "about a straying lover struggling to tell the truth and face the consequences" and "the end of the romance". He had been inspired by the Burt Bacharach—Hal David song "Anyone Who Had a Heart" because, according to Costello, "everything I did seemed to mark the absence of one". Costello also quoted the line "I don't want to hear it" from Randy Newman's "I Don't Want to Hear It Anymore." Costello also "changed every 'I'" to "we" and "he" to remove the personal nature of the song; he stated, "This was pop music, not confession".

Musically, Costello cited the Left Banke's "Walk Away Renée" as inspiration. He noted that, after hearing "Walk Away Renée", he wanted to "write a melody that was that airborne." Costello's a cappella intro of "Oh, I" was inspired by the similar a cappella opening of the Beatles' "Girl." The song features no guitars, instead focusing on Steve Nieve's keyboard and synthesizer work. This keyboard-centric arrangement was in part inspired by ABBA. Costello and producer Nick Lowe sang backing vocals on the recording.

== Release ==
"Accidents Will Happen" was a late addition to the Armed Forces album, having been written after most of the album's other tracks. To make room for the song on the album, the track "Clean Money" was cut; Costello dismissed that song as an "overly powdered-up rocker" and noted that the song "would have set an entirely different scene than a song that opened with the line 'I just don't know where to begin'". "Clean Money" would ultimately be released as one of the B-sides of his 1980 single "Clubland" as well as on the rarities albums Ten Bloody Marys & Ten How's Your Fathers and Taking Liberties.

"Accidents Will Happen" was released as the second single from the Armed Forces album, after "Oliver's Army". It reached number 28 on the UK Singles Chart in June 1979. The song also reached number 101 in the United States and attracted notable FM radio play.

In reference to the song title, the cover of the single was printed inside-out, and the run-out groove on side A reads "Porky Prime Cuts Will Happen" (referring to the trademark signature of cutting engineer George Peckham). It was later released in a proper cover showing stills from the animated video.

The single had two B-sides, "Talking in the Dark" and "Wednesday Week". The songs had first been released in December 1978, when Elvis Costello & the Attractions gave out free copies of a single containing the two then-unreleased songs. Only 9,000 copies of this single were pressed and, when "Accidents Will Happen" was released, both songs were used as B-sides, before later being included on the compilation album Taking Liberties.

A live version of the song would be released on an EP included with early American pressings of Armed Forces, featuring the stripped-down arrangement from Hollywood High with Costello on vocals and Nieve on piano. AllMusic's Mark Deming described this version as "a telling example of the malleability of Costello's music, and a preview of the stylistic diversity that was to dominate his work in later years". This version would also appear on the live album Live at Hollywood High.

== Music video ==
"Accidents Will Happen" was accompanied by an animated music video created by Annabel Jankel and Rocky Morton. It features cartoon footage of the band interspersed with accidents, such as toast being burnt, a bathtub overflowing, and a nuclear missile being launched. According to Jankel, Costello had been unavailable for a live-action video, so 35mm stills of the band were used. Speaking of the video, Jankel said,

"Accidents Will Happen" inspired a visually focused conversation that threw up a bank of ideas to do with Accidents—from the mundane Domestic to the catastrophic no-going-back. Accidents of course can be "Accidents" which is what we are wrangling with now, 40 years later—in the current political climate.

The ending sequence features a computer-generated image of Costello that was created using a computer at a London university. Jankel cites Piet Mondrian as inspiration for the visual. Because of this feature, PC Magazine described this portion as "the very first computer-generated moving image in a music video." The video was one of the 35 videos selected for the Museum of Modern Art's "Golden Oldies of Music Video" exhibition in 2003.

== Reception ==
"Accidents Will Happen" has received critical acclaim as one of the highlights of Armed Forces and as one of Costello's greatest songs. Geoffrey Himes of The Washington Post lavishly praised the song in a 1979 article, saying, "'Accidents Will Happen' ... is one of those rare moments in rock 'n' roll that works on all levels at once". He went on to call the track "the kind of high point that marks a great era of music", comparable with Elvis Presley's "Mystery Train" and Bob Dylan's "Like a Rolling Stone" in stature. Cash Box said it "is heavily layered" that "synthesizer and upfront drum back Elvis' distinct vocals. " Record World called it a "thoughtful pop/rocker [that] should give him Top 40 presence."

In 2003, Matt LeMay of Pitchfork Media described the song in this way: "'Accidents Will Happen', one of the finest songs in his, or any, repertoire, matches a signature smirking double-entendre with an almost Baroque pop sensibility. Melodically and lyrically, the song is above reproach, as Costello sings of infidelity with what could either be construed as regret or smug satisfaction. It's also one of several songs on Armed Forces to benefit from the album's dense production." Mark Deming of AllMusic lauded the song's "cocky confidence and gleeful bitterness."

"Accidents Will Happen" has been ranked by multiple critics as one of Costello's best. In 2004, Entertainment Weekly voted it as one of Costello's top 10 greatest tunes, while The Daily Telegraph's Martin Chilton named the song Costello's 5th best, calling it "one of Elvis Costello's simple and effective songs". Ryan Prado of Paste named it Costello's 14th best, praising the opening line for "providing a clever actual beginning to not only the song, but the entire album". In a list for Louder, David Ford named the song one of Costello's top ten best, similarly praising the opening lyric for "kick[ing] off the Armed Forces album perfectly".

== Charts ==
Chart (1979)	Peak position
UK Singles (Official Charts)	28
US (Billboard Bubbling Under Hot 100)	101

== In other media ==
In E.T. the Extra-Terrestrial, Elliott's brother, Michael, sings this song in the family kitchen after coming home from school. Elliott has an Elvis Costello poster up in his bedroom.

The song is played in The Simpsons Treehouse of Horror XXVI segment, "Wanted: Dead, Then Alive", in which Sideshow Bob keeps killing Bart Simpson and bringing him back to life over and over again in a montage.
