= Shipbuilding (song) =

Song written by Elvis Costello and Clive Langer

"Shipbuilding" is a song with lyrics by Elvis Costello and music by Clive Langer. Written during the Falklands War of 1982, Costello's lyrics highlight the irony of the war bringing back prosperity to the traditional shipbuilding areas of Clydeside, Merseyside (Cammell Laird), North East England and Belfast (Harland and Wolff) to build new ships to replace those being sunk in the war, whilst also sending off the sons of these areas to fight and, potentially, lose their lives in those same ships. According to Robert Sandall, the best version of the song is the one recorded and released as a single by English singer-songwriter Robert Wyatt in August 1982 a few months after the Falklands War, although it was not a hit until it was re-released eight months later on the first anniversary of the conflict.

In September 2013, Elvis Costello and the Roots released an answer song written from the perspective of the other side of the conflict, called "Cinco Minutos con Vos" ("Five Minutes with You"). The song is a duet partly sung in Argentinian Spanish by La Marisoul.

== Robert Wyatt version ==
"Shipbuilding"

Single by Robert Wyatt
- B-side: "Memories of You"; "Round Midnight"
- Released: 20 August 1982 (reissued 22 April 1983)
- Recorded: 1982
- Length: 3:04
- Label: Rough Trade
- Songwriters: Music: Clive Langer; Lyrics: Elvis Costello
- Producers: Elvis Costello, Clive Langer and Alan Winstanley (credited as "Clangwinstello")

Robert Wyatt singles chronology
"Grass" (1981)	"Shipbuilding" (1982)	"The Age of Self" (1984)

Music video
- Robert Wyatt – Shipbuilding on YouTube

According to Clive Langer, he had written the tune for Robert Wyatt but was not happy with the lyrics that he had written himself. Langer played the tune to Elvis Costello at a party hosted by Nick Lowe, and within days Costello had produced what he described as "the best lyrics I've ever written". In a 1983 interview with NME, Mark Bedford of Madness, who played double bass on the single, recounted the history of the song:

At first Robert Wyatt wasn't involved. The original plan was to release four different versions of the song, which was then called 'Ten to Nine', as an EP with four different guest vocalists. There were going to be versions of the song by Elvis, Clive and Steve Allen [Langer's former bandmate in the 1970s group Deaf School], but once Elvis had done some more work on the lyrics and changed the song to 'Shipbuilding', they decided to approach Robert Wyatt and his version was so special that it came out as a straight single.

Wyatt himself recalled, "Geoff (Travis, head of Rough Trade Records) sent me a cassette saying this is a pretty good song, you ought to sing it. So I tried it out and it sounded good. The musical setting was nothing to do with me. Elvis had already recorded a vocal for it – very good vocal – and it was going to come out in the same form with him singing on it. I went in and did a vocal in a couple of hours with Mr. Costello producing, and that was it ... I had no expectations of it at all. All I thought about was singing it in tune!"

The Robert Wyatt version was originally released as a single on Rough Trade on 20 August 1982, but failed to chart. It was re-released on 22 April 1983 when it reached number 35 in the UK Singles Chart, marking the first ever UK Top 40 entry for Rough Trade.

The single was released in five different sleeves, all featuring sections from two of Stanley Spencer's series of eight panels entitled Shipbuilding on the Clyde which were painted in the 1940s. Four of the sleeves featured two different sections each from "Riggers" and "Riveters", which folded out into four-page leporello pictures. The panels themselves were donated to the Imperial War Museum in London: they are now on rotating display at the Riverside Museum in Glasgow on loan from the Imperial War Museum.

Langer and Costello discuss the writing of "Shipbuilding" in a BBC Radio 4 programme, Soul Music, first broadcast March 2013.

== Reception ==
The single was acclaimed by the music press, with the NME writers voting it their third favourite song of 1982. Wyatt's version of the song was a favourite of English musician David Bowie.

Trouser Press called it "as subtle and insightful an anti-war song as anyone's ever written." Langer recalled the work with great pride in 2025: "I've said it before in interviews: I was working in America, and he was in Australia, and he called me up to say he'd written the best lyric he'd ever written. I said: 'It's the best tune I've ever written, so let's hope we're onto something.'"

=== Track listing ===
- 7" single
1. "Shipbuilding" (Clive Langer, Elvis Costello) – 3:04
2. "Memories of You" (Eubie Blake, Andy Razaf) – 2:56
- 12" single
1. "Shipbuilding" (Langer, Costello) – 3:04
2. "Memories of You" (Blake, Razaf) – 2:56
3. "Round Midnight" (Thelonious Monk) – 4:08

=== Musicians ===
All except Wyatt are uncredited on the record.

- Mark Bedford – double bass
- Elvis Costello – backing vocals
- Martin Hughes – drums
- Clive Langer – organ
- Steve Nieve – piano
- Robert Wyatt – lead vocals

=== Charts ===
Chart (1983)	Peak position
New Zealand (Recorded Music NZ)	27
UK Singles (Official Charts)	35

== Other versions ==
"Shipbuilding"

Song by Elvis Costello & the Attractions

from the album Punch the Clock
- Released: 5 August 1983
- Recorded: January–April 1983
- Length: 4:53
- Songwriters: Music: Clive Langer; Lyrics: Elvis Costello
- Producers: Clive Langer & Alan Winstanley, assisted by Gavin Greenaway & Colin Fairley

Official audio
- "Shipbuilding" on YouTube

Costello recorded his own version of the song for his 1983 album Punch the Clock, featuring a performance by jazz trumpeter Chet Baker. Other versions have been recorded by Suede (for The Help Album, a charity album), Tasmin Archer (whose version was a UK top 40 hit in 1994), Graham Coxon, June Tabor, the Unthanks, Hue and Cry and the Bad Shepherds.

== See also ==
- List of anti-war songs
