= F-Beat Records =

British record label

- Trade name: F-Beat Records Limited
- Formerly: Garage Records
- Type: Private
- Founded: 5 November 1979; 46 years ago
- Headquarters: Television Centre, London,

F-Beat Records was a record label set up by Andrew Lauder and Jake Riviera in 1979. Its first release, "I Can't Stand Up for Falling Down" by Elvis Costello & the Attractions, reached number 4 in the UK charts, the highest singles chart position the label attained. The first album released on the label was Costello's Get Happy!!, which peaked at number 2 on the UK Albums Chart.

As well as releases from Costello, whom Riviera managed, he sought acts for the label via an advert in NME, and one of the bands who applied (and were given an audition, ultimately unsuccessfully) were Johnny Marr and Andy Rourke's band White Dice. The roster was built up to include Nick Lowe, Carlene Carter, the Blasters, Blanket of Secrecy and Clive Langer and the Boxes. The album and single covers were mostly designed by Barney Bubbles and also Antoinette (Tony) Riviera.

F-Beat was distributed in the mid-1980s by RCA Records.

Costello notched up another fifteen hits for F-Beat before leaving for Warner Bros. Records.

The original F-Beat label was closed down in 1986, but it was briefly reactivated in the early 1990s with a new roster including Blab Happy, Nicola Hitchcock, Phil Burdett and the Gutter Brothers.

The F-Beat label had associated offshoot labels in Demon Records and Edsel Records, the latter concentrating on reissues. F-Beat and its sub-labels were acquired by MCI Records and then in 1998 by Kingfisher plc for £2 million.

== Roster ==
- Elvis Costello & the Attractions
- Nick Lowe
- Rockpile
- Steve Nieve
- Clive Langer & the Boxes
- The Coward Brothers
- Carlene Carter
- Blanket of Secrecy
- The Blasters
- Blab Happy
- Nicola Hitchcock
- The Gutter Brothers

== See also ==
- List of record labels
