= Suit of Lights (song) =

Song by Elvis Costello

from the album King of America
- Released: 21 February 1986
- Recorded: July–September 1985
- Studio: Ocean Way, Sunset Sound, & Sound Factory Studio, Los Angeles
- Genre: Roots rock; folk rock
- Length: 4:06
- Label: F-Beat (UK); Columbia (US)
- Songwriter(s): Elvis Costello
- Producer(s): T Bone Burnett

"Suit of Lights" is a song written and performed by new wave musician Elvis Costello that was first released on his 1986 album King of America. Written about Costello's memories of his father, the song includes introspective lyrics about the "dubious embrace of celebrity" while also featuring the sole performance of the Attractions on the album, who were largely supplanted by the studio professionals of the Confederates on the rest of King of America.

Released on King of America as the penultimate track, the song has since seen positive reception from critics and has appeared on compilation albums.

== Background ==
"Suit of Lights" was written by Elvis Costello as a reflection on his father, Ross McManus, who was a professional bandleader for the Joe Loss orchestra. Costello commented, "This was inspired by watching my father, Ross, sing of experience and tenderness to an uncomprehending rabble of karaoke-trained dullards. The lessons I might have learned from my own words seemed only to have dawned on me after the event." The bitterness that Costello felt from observing this resulted in what he described as "a dense lyric written from the jaundices performer's perspective about mob instinct and how one man's amusement is another man's job of work." At early stages of the album's composition, some lyrics that finally appeared in "Suit of Lights" were instead written as part of "Jack of All Parades".

While most songs on King of America were recorded with the Confederates, a loose band of American studio musicians that included members of the TCB Band, "Suit of Lights" is the sole recording on the album that features Costello's long-term backing band the Attractions. Costello had initially sought to use the band for more songs, but sessions were largely unsuccessful, with the band failing to cut satisfactory versions of "Brilliant Mistake" as well as "Blue Chair" and "Next Time Round", two songs that would be rerecorded with the band for Costello's next album Blood & Chocolate. After recording the B-side "Baby's Got A Brand New Hairdo", the band channeled its "pent-up frustrations" into what Costello described as "one of the most passionate Attractions recordings" on "Suit of Lights".

== Release ==
"Suit of Lights" was first released in February 1986 as the fourteenth track on Costello's 1986 album King of America. Though not released as a single, the song received attention for its reflective lyrics and status as the only Attractions recording on the album. As a result, author Graeme Thomson notes that many critics read "Suit of Lights" as "the burial of Elvis Costello and the rebirth of Declan MacManus". In response, Costello commented, "Some very smart guy who interviewed me a few months ago, who'd listened quite acutely to that song, he said it seemed like I was burying the Elvis Costello persona in that song. But the song isn't so much about a funeral, it's about a resurrection. ... It's such an Attractions song. They are the only people on earth who could've played that tune. But that's just ironic, it wasn't deliberate."

In addition to appearing on King of America, the song has appeared on compilations such as 1989's Girls Girls Girls and 2015's Unfaithful Music & Disappearing Ink, the latter of which served as a companion disc to Costello's autobiography of the same name.

== Critical reception ==
"Suit of Lights" has seen critical acclaim since its release, with many noting the Attractions' instrumental performance. In a 1986 article, Musician described the song as "a sort of requiem for Rhinestone Cowboys and Last Year's Models" and noted the Attractions "played the pants off" the track. Melody Maker highlighted the song as an instance where Costello "in part exorcises the illusions of the dreams and success he has himself lived through."

Retrospective writers have been similarly effusive in their praise for the song. AllMusic called the song "glorious" and concluded, "There are lots of great songs on King of America, but nothing that rings with the combination of fierce emotion and familiar warmth that you hear on 'Suit of Lights.'" Trouser Press described the song as "monumental".
