= Jack of All Parades =

1986 song by Elvis Costello

Song by Elvis Costello

from the album King of America
- Released: 21 February 1986
- Recorded: July–September 1985
- Studio: Ocean Way, Sunset Sound, & Sound Factory, Los Angeles
- Length: 5:18
- Label: F-Beat
- Songwriter(s): Elvis Costello
- Producer(s): T Bone Burnett, Elvis Costello (as Declan Patrick Aloysius MacManus) and Larry Kalman Hirsch

Official audio
- "Jack of All Parades" on YouTube

"Jack of All Parades" is a song by the English singer-songwriter Elvis Costello, which was released on his tenth studio album King of America (1986). The song was written by Costello, credited under his real name Declan MacManus, and produced by T Bone Burnett, Costello and Larry Kalman Hirsch. As a musician, Costello is credited on the track as "The Little Hands of Concrete". It is a love song, inspired by his new relationship with Cait O'Riordan of the Pogues, and is unusual in Costello's catalogue for being a positive love song.

The song has been positively reviewed by critics, some of whom commented that the lyrics were straightforward and affecting. A demo version was issued on the 2005 Rhino re-release of King of America.

== Background and recording ==
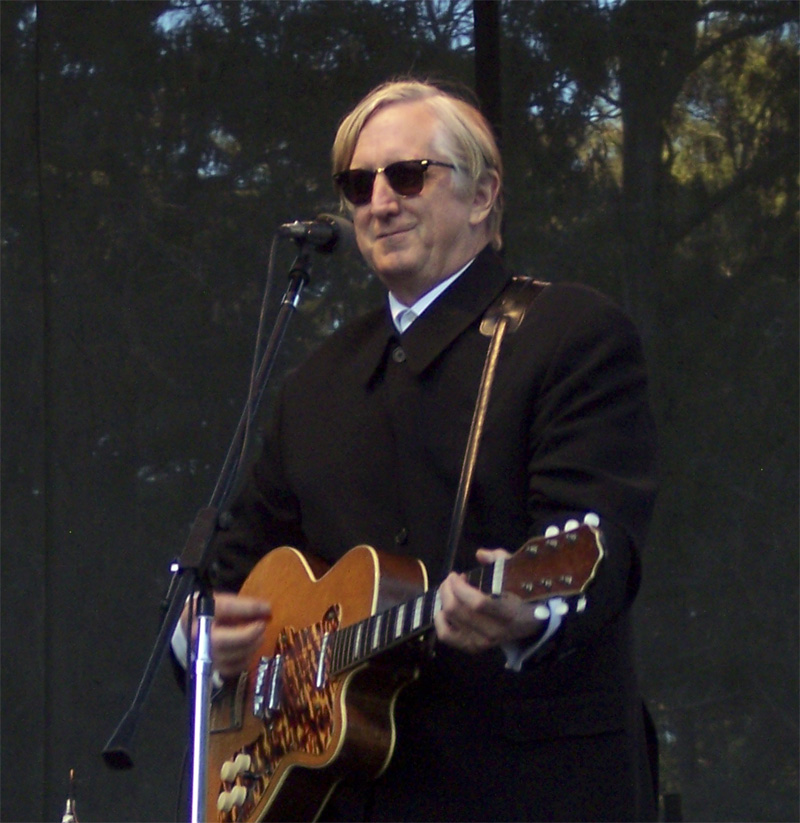
Costello toured with T Bone Burnett (pictured in 2007) before the pair worked together on King of America.

After the release of his album Goodbye Cruel World (1984), Elvis Costello distanced himself from his long-term backing group the Attractions, and started touring with T Bone Burnett. He also began a relationship with Cait O'Riordan of the Pogues. Recording for Costello's next studio album, King of America, commenced in July 1985 in Los Angeles, with Burnett as producer, and musicians including members of the TCB Band and others. The Attractions joined some of the sessions in August, but Costello was unhappy with the outcome and did not invite them back. King of America was released in February 1986 on the F-Beat label in the United Kingdom.

The authorship of "Jack of All Parades" was credited to Declan MacManus, Costello's real name. The musicians for the album are credited as a group as "The Costello Show Featuring The Attractions and The Confederates". On "Jack of All Parades", Costello is credited as the guitarist under the pseudonym "The Little Hands of Concrete", a nickname given to him by Nick Lowe because of his tendency to break guitar strings. Costello's biographer Brian Hinton describes the music as "a shuffle beat, led by [T-Bone] Wolk's electric bass", and where Costello's vocals are "endlessly echoed on the chorus". The other musicians on the track are Steve Nieve of the Attractions on piano, Mitchell Froom playing Hammond organ, and drummer Mickey Curry. In the liner notes for the 1995 reissue of the album, Costello wrote that "With the exception of some trickery on "Jack Of All Parades", there were few effects employed other than reverb." Costello commented that "Without the pressure to deliver a 'hit-sound' the band worked very well, with fine touches such as T-Bone's volume-control bass interlude before the coda. Steve Nieve added piano to this track, as we searched for the right combination of musicians to capture the last few elusive titles [on the album]." On King of America, the track ends with an interrupted cadence which sets up the next track, "Suit of Lights", but when issued on the tape cassette version of the compilation Girls Girls Girls (1989), it was the last track on a side, meaning, according to music scholar Dai Griffiths, that "the cadence [is] left to dangle in the silence". another music scholar, James Perone, wrote that the song, with its verses having different numbers of lines to each other, has the "most unconventional and complicated structure" of any track on King of America. A demo version was included on the 2005 Rhino re-release of King of America.

== Themes and reception ==
Costello biographer Graeme Thomson described both "Jack of All Parades" and "I'll Wear It Proudly" from King of America as transparently about Costello's love for O'Riordan. Costello had called "Jack of All Parades" "an unapologetic companion" to "I'll Wear It Proudly" in the 1995 album liner notes. Hinton considers "I'll Wear It Proudly", to be self-hating, while "Jack of All Parades" was about the start of an unanticipated love affair. Costello remarked in his 2015 autobiography that "'I'll Wear It Proudly' was an abject song about the fool that love makes of a man past his prime, and 'Jack of All Parades' mocked the philanderer in the moment of surrender." Mike Gardner of Record Mirror recognised that both were explicitly love songs, and Liverpool Echo critic Jim Gough praised them as heartfelt in a way that Costello's earlier work had lacked.

Biographer David Gouldstone wrote that the track referred to a narrator willingly giving up stardom for love. Gouldstone commented that the key part of the song was the final verse, where the straightforwardness of the lyrics "is convincing and somehow very touching". In Pitchfork in 2005, Stephen Deusner opined that the dark humour found in songs such as "Jack of All Parades" on the album was a continuation from Costello's earlier work. John Griffin of The Gazette felt that "gymnastic pop exercises" were another theme carried through from Costello's oeuvre, and mentioned "Jack of All Parades" as "a killer" that would have fit with the rest of Costello's Imperial Bedroom (1982). Reviewing the 2005 reissue, Rob Sheffield of Rolling Stone highlighted "Jack of All Parades", "I'll Wear It Proudly," and "Indoor Fireworks" as "twisted adult love ballads" songs that were more affecting than Costello's earlier recordings.

Some critics remarked that it was unusual for Costello to write a positive love song. Joyce Millman of The Boston Phoenix remarked that in "Jack of All Parades", Costello "drops the security of circuitous wordplay for an achingly direct 'I loved you there and then/ It's as simple as that'". In NME, Sean O'Hagan described it as intimate, and, being about "the redemptive power of romance", quite unlike Costello's earlier work. Author Larry David Smith called the song an "unprecedented statement of relational joy" for Costello; and one of only three "songs of relational celebration" by Costello as of 2004. (Note: The other two identified by Smith were the later "Such Unlikely Lovers" from Painted from Memory (1998) and "15 Petals" from When I Was Cruel (2002).) Music executive Gary Stewart wrote that the song encompasses "many moods, tempos, and textures that underpin its first-person confession" from a narrator seeking a fulfilling relationship.

The song contains a mention of "the crimes of Paris", which Hinton thinks "could either refer to a dirty French weekend, or the classical hero of Troy"; "Crimes of Paris" was a song on Costello's next studio album, Blood & Chocolate (1986); this is one of several examples in Costello's catalogue of him re-using a title or phrase on a different one of his records. When Costello opened a concert in Nashville with the song in 2014, the reviewer for Nashville Scene felt that his delivery of the chorus lines "To be the love of one true heart/ Or the jack of all parades" was "like a statement of long-tail career purpose."

== Credits and personnel ==
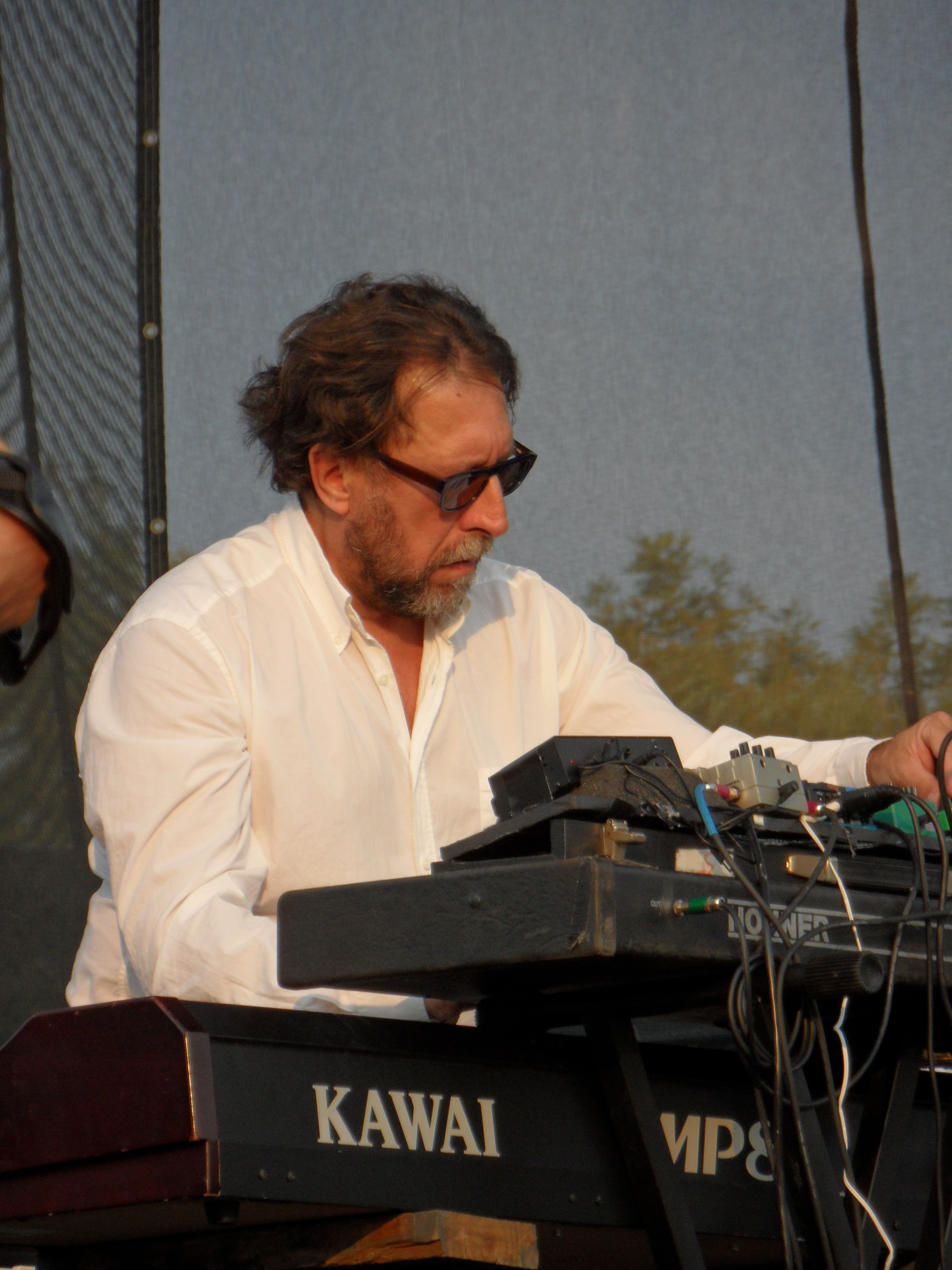
Steve Nieve (pictured in 2012) was the only member of Costello's long-term backing group the Attractions to play on "Jack of All Parades".

Musicians

The Costello Show:

- The Little Hands Of Concrete – vocals, acoustic guitar
- T-Bone Wolk – electric bass
- Mickey Curry – sticks & drums
- Mitchell Froom – Hammond organ
- Steve Nieve – piano

Technical personnel

Produced by J. Henry (T-Bone) Burnett & Declan Patrick Aloysius MacManus with Larry Kalman Hirsch.
