= I Hope You're Happy Now (Elvis Costello song) =

1986 song by Elvis Costello

Song by Elvis Costello and the Attractions

from the album Blood & Chocolate
- A-side: "I Want You"
- Released: 15 September 1986
- Recorded: March–May 1986
- Genre: Garage rock; new wave
- Length: 3:07
- Label: Demon
- Songwriter: Elvis Costello
- Producers: Nick Lowe; Colin Fairley

Elvis Costello and the Attractions singles chronology
"Tokyo Storm Warning" (1986)	"I Want You" / "I Hope You're Happy Now" (1986)	"Blue Chair" (1987)

"I Hope You're Happy Now" is a song written by the English singer-songwriter Elvis Costello, recorded by Costello and the Attractions. The track was released on his 1986 album Blood & Chocolate after several failed attempts to record the song for earlier releases.

Featuring sardonic lyrics about a former relationship, "I Hope You're Happy Now" as the B-side to "I Want You" in November 1986. It has since been positively received by critics and appeared on compilation albums and in Costello's live setlists.

== Background ==
According to Elvis Costello, the final version of "I Hope You're Happy Now" was recorded after "three different attempts" to get the song right. Costello and the Attractions attempted to record the song after Goodbye Cruel World with Nick Lowe, who had not produced a Costello album since Trust, but these recordings were shelved. An early version of the song was performed by Costello and the Attractions on the Tonight Show in 1984. The song was later attempted again during the King of America sessions; early versions of the song have since been released on expanded versions of both Goodbye Cruel World and King of America. He recalled,

My final trip to Hollywood [during the King of America sessions] was made with the intention of adding "I Hope You're Happy Now" to the album. Having previously failed in an attempt to cut it as a single with The Attractions and stumbled through it on my drunken demo session, I was determined to capture it with the Keltner/Scheff/Froom line-up that had provided the heart of the record. Almost before we had the instrumental balances my voice started to vanish. We struggled through a few tentative takes, but it was useless.

The version released on Blood and Chocolate was, according to Costello, ultimately "recorded live in the big, old studio at Olympic (before it was vandalized)". Costello noted that, during the sessions, "We also finally got a take on 'I Hope You're Happy Now' that had a little more humour to it than its originally murderous intent. It almost sounded like pop music". Stylistically, "I Hope You're Happy Now" has been dubbed a "garage rock" effort.

Ed Masley of The Arizona Republic described the song as one where Costello "ridicules [the girl who broke his heart] with 'He's got all the things you need and some that you will never/But you make him sound like frozen food/His love will last forever'." Costello said of the song's lyrics, "In the long run I'm happier to live with it being humorous, rather than murderous".

== Release and reception ==
"I Hope You're Happy Now" was first released as the second track on Blood & Chocolate. An acoustic version of the song was released as the B-side to "I Want You" in November 1986, but no version of the track was ever released on a single of its own. Writer Graeme Thomson said of this choice, "With pop songs of the calibre of 'Blue Chair' and 'I Hope You're Happy Now' at his disposal, to release the doggedly uncommercial 'I Want You' and 'Tokyo Storm Warning'—both over six minutes long— as the first two UK singles was a willfully perverse move". The song has also been released on the compilation albums Girls Girls Girls and The Very Best of Elvis Costello.

"I Hope You're Happy Now" has seen critical acclaim since its release. Ryan J. Prado of Paste Magazine ranked it Costello's 17th best song, called it "a song so instantly gratifying and anthemic I'm surprised it's impossible to put it at #1 on this list". He continued, "Costello's ability to talk shit about people with eloquence is second to none, and put into striking, reverential spotlight here". Stewart Mason of AllMusic said of the song, "Unlike the more studied attempts at recreating the old Attractions sound on 1994's Brutal Youth, this works perfectly, both as a nostalgia trip and as a song". Bryan Wawzenek of Diffuser.fm praised the song's "Beatle-esque beat", while Chris Mautner of The Patriot-News described it as his "favorite song".

== Live history ==
Since its release, "I Hope You're Happy Now" has appeared frequently in Costello's live setlists. A version of the song appears on the Costello live album The Return Of The Spectacular Spinning Songbook. Costello continues to perform the song in his later career, playing it during his "Just Trust" tour in 2019.
