= Next Time Round =

Song by Elvis Costello and the Attractions

from the album Blood & Chocolate
- Released: 15 September 1986
- Recorded: March–May 1986
- Studio: Olympic Studios
- Genre: Garage rock; new wave
- Length: 3:28
- Label: Demon
- Songwriter: Elvis Costello
- Producers: Nick Lowe; Colin Fairley

"Next Time Round" is a song written by the English singer-songwriter Elvis Costello and recorded by Elvis Costello and the Attractions. The track was released on his 1986 album Blood & Chocolate after an earlier attempt to record the song for his previous album King of America was scrapped.

Featuring a sarcastic tone, "Next Time Round" employs classic rock and California Sound-esque musical elements. It has since been positively received by critics and appeared in Costello's live setlists.

== Background ==
Like several other songs on Blood & Chocolate, "Next Time Round" was attempted by Costello during the sessions for his previous 1986 album King of America, but this version would ultimately be scrapped. In addition to recording an aborted demo at Red Bus Studios in London, Costello tried to record the song during the sessions with his longtime backing band the Attractions. These sessions would be fraught with tension and only the recordings of "Suit of Lights" and the B-side "Baby's Got A Brand New Hairdo" would see release. Costello described this version of "Next Time Round" as "lacklustre" and noted the song woulld "have to wait until the Blood & Chocolate sessions to be more fully realised."

When Costello reunited with the Attractions to record Blood & Chocolate, he decided to revive "Next Time Round" for a recording that was "amplified and roughed up by the deliberately crude Olympic sound." He explained, "The more sarcastic tone of 'Next Time Round' had ... not found a place on the previous record, but it now provided a rave-up finale for an album that stays mostly in the dark." Costello further noted that this new recording exhibited traces of the California Sound in its backing vocals.

== Release and reception ==
"Next Time Round" was released as the final track on Blood & Chocolate in September 1986. Author Franklin Bruno noted the song as one of the many "rave-ups" that Costello used to close albums, playing a similar role to songs like "The World and His Wife" on Punch the Clock and "Radio Radio" on This Year's Model. "Next Time Round" was not released as a single.

"Next Time Round" has seen positive reception from music writers. In a 1986 review of Blood & Chocolate, Spin Magazine described the song as "a truly towering fit of persecution mania with a great melody and a good beat." Rolling Stone praised it as "suicidal, iron-fisted Merseybeat," while the Montreal Gazette dubbed it a "scalding last put-down." Author James Perone commented, "Although this song is not among those that find their names on lists of 'Elvis's greatest,' it is a solid example of Costello's rock-song craftsmanship."

== Live history ==
"Next Time Round" has made intermittent appearances in Costello's live setlist since its release. Costello has noted that these live takes often accentuate the California Sound characteristics that were hinted at in the studio version; he specifically highlights a performance during his "Spinning Wheel" tour, where members of the Bangles made a guest appearance and provided Mamas and Papas-inflected backing vocals.

== Cover versions ==
"Next Time Round" was covered by Canadian rock band the Trews.
