= I Want You (Elvis Costello song) =

Single by Elvis Costello and the Attractions

from the album Blood & Chocolate
- B-side: "I Hope You're Happy Now"
- Released: November 1986
- Recorded: March–May 1986
- Genre: New wave
- Length: 6:45
- Label: Imp
- Songwriter: Elvis Costello
- Producers: Nick Lowe; Colin Fairley

Elvis Costello and the Attractions singles chronology
| "Tokyo Storm Warning" (1986) | "I Want You" (1986) | "Blue Chair" (1987) |

"I Want You" is a song written by the English singer-songwriter Elvis Costello and recorded with his backing band the Attractions. It was released on his 1986 album Blood & Chocolate.

Featuring lyrics about an obsessive romance, "I Want You" was released as the second single from Blood and Chocolate. It has since been positively received by critics and covered by multiple artists.

== Background ==
The dark lyrics describe a tormented romantic relationship. The narrator recounts the details of his partner's infidelities, while repeatedly declaring "I want you" after each line. The music is taken at a slow, dirge-like tempo; towards the conclusion Costello offers a brief guitar solo that repeats two dissonant notes. In his album notes for the Girls Girls Girls compilation album, Costello wrote that "[t]he sound of this track was always going to be the aural equivalent of a blurred polaroid, so no apologies for the lack of fidelity. None are needed, it's just a pornographic snapshot; lots of broken glass, a squashed box of chocolates and a little blood on the wall."

Due to its "bitter" lyrics, Costello commented, "That just that song is used as opening dance in weddings ... I humbly bow my head, and can only wish those people a safe journey."

Attractions bassist Bruce Thomas later expressed his dislike for the song, commenting, "Elvis was trying really hard to do the psychopath in 'I Want You' and all that. It's things like that that really annoy me. He loves all that stuff! That 'fingernail scratching down the wall' and 'I want youuuu' ... this sort of Tony Perkins job. I'll give you the address of a good analyst! That's not soul-bearing or honest, it's just neurotic. I find it incredibly neurotic and tension-inducing, which he'd say is entirely the point, but I thought, well that's not the point of self-expression at the end of the day."

== Release and reception ==
"I Want You" was released as the second single from Blood and Chocolate in 1986, backed with an acoustic version of "I Hope You're Happy Now", another song from the album. The single was a moderate success on the UK charts, peaking at number 79 over a chart stay of 2 weeks. It was also voted into 40th position on John Peel's Festive Fifty for 1986, even though Peel had not previously played the track on his show.

Stephen Thomas Erlewine of AllMusic described it as "[among] the nastiest songs he has ever recorded, both lyrically and musically". Blender Magazine named the song as one of the key tracks from Blood and Chocolate to download while Greg Kot of the Chicago Tribune described the song as "riveting". Robert Christgau called the song one of the two strongest on the album. Rolling Stone called the track "an epic testament to jealousy over a former lover’s new partner". Jeremy Allen of The Guardian named the song one of Costello's top 10 best, saying, "The lyrics and music together are intimately intense, like someone breathing down your own neck, making you shudder, but the melody is irresistible too." The Daily Telegraph's Martin Chilton named the song Costello's 35th best.

== Other versions ==
In 2006, Fiona Apple covered the song, accompanied by Elvis Costello, as a VH1 tribute to Costello. Gavin Edwards of Rolling Stone said of the performance, "[Apple] metabolizes every molecule of the song’s poisoned atmosphere." Costello also collaborated with hip hop band the Roots to perform a version of "I Want You" in 2013; Questlove said that the song "is pretty much the soundtrack to every relationship I've ever had".

In 2010, Steven Page released a cover of the song recorded with the Art of Time Ensemble for his second solo album, A Singer Must Die.

In 2017, Lydia Lunch and Cypress Grove released a version of the song on their album Under the Covers.
