= I Hope You're Happy Now =

I Hope You're Happy Now may refer to:

- "I Hope You're Happy Now" (Elvis Costello song), 1986
- "I Hope You're Happy Now" (Carly Pearce and Lee Brice song), 2019
