= King of America =

Studio album by the Costello Show featuring the Attractions and the Confederates
- Released: 21 February 1986
- Recorded: July–September 1985
- Studios: Ocean Way, Sunset Sound and Sound Factory (Los Angeles)
- Genres: Roots rock; country; folk; R&B; americana
- Length: 57:36
- Labels: F-Beat; Columbia
- Producers: J. Henry (T Bone) Burnett; Declan MacManus a.k.a. (The Coward Brothers)

Elvis Costello chronology
The Best of Elvis Costello – The Man (1985)	King of America (1986)	Blood & Chocolate (1986)

Singles from King of America
- 1. "Don't Let Me Be Misunderstood" Released: January 1986; 2. "Lovable" Released: 1986 (US)

King of America is the tenth studio album by the English singer-songwriter Elvis Costello, released on 21 February 1986. Co-produced by Costello and T Bone Burnett, the album originated following a series of tours the two made under the name "the Coward Brothers". Recording took place in mid-1985 at various studios in Los Angeles, California, with a group of American session musicians dubbed "the Confederates". Selected by Burnett, they included Ray Brown, Earl Palmer and former members of Elvis Presley's TCB Band. Costello's regular backing band, the Attractions, were intended to appear on half of the album before poor sessions led to them appearing on only one track, "Suit of Lights".

Featuring a mostly acoustic sound, King of America was a departure from Costello's previous albums, exploring roots rock, country, folk, R&B and Americana. Its personal songs delve into themes of romance, betrayal, alcoholism and the American dream. The cover artwork features Costello wearing a crown and matching jacket, which commentators at the time found both "ridiculous" and "serious". Costello credited himself on the album sleeve under his real name, Declan MacManus; the album itself was credited to "the Costello Show featuring the Attractions and Confederates" in the UK and Europe and to "the Costello Show featuring Elvis Costello" in North America.

King of America reached number 11 in the UK and number 39 in the US. It was supported by a cover of Nina Simone's "Don't Let Me Be Misunderstood", a UK top 40 single. Hailed as a return to form for Costello and his best record in years, the album was praised for its production, depth and vocal performances. Mixed reviews found the album too complex and lacking accessibility to attract new fans. Later reviewers call King of America one of Costello's best works, praising its personal tone and the songwriter's growing maturity, and arguing the album anticipated Costello's various musical excursions and collaborations in the following decades. It received expanded reissues in 1995 and 2005, which were positively received.

== Background and development ==
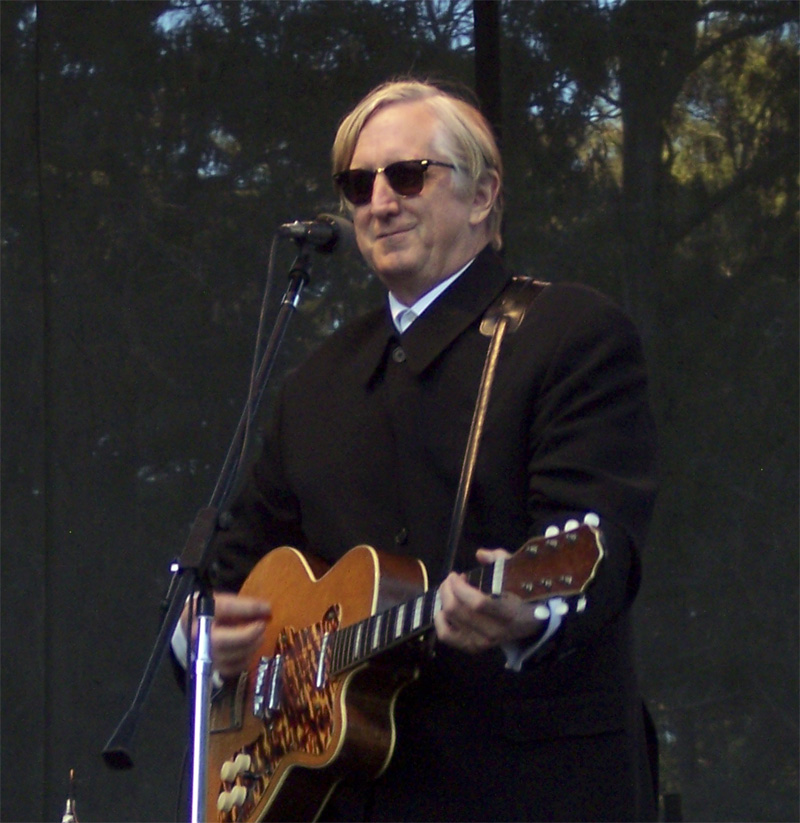
Costello collaborated extensively with T Bone Burnett (pictured in 2007) for King of America.

Elvis Costello undertook a series of solo tours during late 1984 and early 1985, sharing the bill with the musician T Bone Burnett. Touring under the name "the Coward Brothers"—partially based on the Everly Brothers—the duo assumed the personas of Howard (Costello) and Henry Coward (Burnett), performing numerous country songs and covers. According to Costello, the Coward Brothers were on their final tour after the failure of the previous one. The solo shows were successful, leading Burnett to encourage Costello to record his next studio album with his voice and acoustic guitar as the main instruments, so the music itself would "shine through relatively unadorned". Trial sessions began in January 1985 at the Sound Factory in Los Angeles, California. Acting as a blueprint for the recording of King of America, the sessions yielded a track called "The People's Limousine", written by Costello and Burnett during trips to Italy. The song was released as a single under the Coward Brothers name in July 1985, backed by a cover of Leon Payne's "They'll Never Take Her Love Away from Me".

Around the same time, Costello recorded solo demos of new material at Sunset Sound studios with Burnett and the engineer Larry Hirsch. The songs were musically straightforward and emphasised emotional honesty, a stylistic departure from Costello's two previous studio albums Punch the Clock (1983) and Goodbye Cruel World (1984). Costello said at the time that he stripped the songs of the "musical kinks" and made the words clearer: "I started thinking more about the songs and much less about the records. It became clear to me that I had to write very, very simple songs." Given that the new material was America-centred, they wanted American musicians to play on the record.

Costello and Burnett planned session dates and musical lineups, which would be tailored to each song, during the flights on their Coward Brothers tour of Australia and Japan in June 1985. Burnett later stated: "There was a tremendous amount of planning that went into that record. We had pages and pages of production notes." Burnett was responsible for selecting the musicians and experimenting with sounds and styles.

== Recording ==
Recording for the album began in July 1985 immediately after Costello performed solo at Live Aid. The sessions took place between Ocean Way and Sunset Sound studios in Los Angeles, with Costello and Burnett co-producing and Hirsch engineering. For the initial recording dates, the core band was assembled: guitarist James Burton, bassist Jerry Scheff, and drummer Ron Tutt, members of the TCB Band who had backed Elvis Presley in the 1970s. According to Costello, tracks were recorded "as 'live' as possible" with minor overdubs added later. Songs recorded included "Our Little Angel", "The Big Light", "American Without Tears", "Glitter Gulch" and "Shoes Without Heels"; the group also attempted versions of "Lovable" and "Indoor Fireworks". About half of the final album's songs were completed in three days. Costello's working relationship with the musicians was vastly different than with the Attractions: he played the songs first and explained what they meant so the players could understand what Costello desired. Scheff later said: "In the studio [Costello] kept control of everything. It was very much his deal and his visions."

The second set of musicians included the jazz bassist Ray Brown and the New Orleans drummer Earl Palmer, the pianist Tom Canning and the keyboardist Mitchell Froom. Costello was intimidated by Brown and Palmer at first, as he had not intended "off-the-peg 'legends'" for the project. The lineup recorded "Poisoned Rose" and a J.B. Lenoir song called "Eisenhower Blues", which Costello said was only taped to "[give] everyone a chance to relax and play a bit". Other musicians that contributed included the drummer Jim Keltner ("Lovable", "I'll Wear It Proudly", "Sleep of the Just" and the outtake "King of Confidence") and the bassist T-Bone Wolk and the drummer Mickey Curry ("Jack of All Parades", "Brilliant Mistake" and the outtake "Blue Chair"). The American musicians were dubbed "the Confederates" on the LP sleeve.

Costello's regular backing band the Attractions—the keyboardist Steve Nieve, the bassist Bruce Thomas and the drummer Pete Thomas (no relation)—flew in from England in mid-August 1985, about two-thirds through the sessions. Costello had originally intended to use them on half of the album's songs to differentiate their style from the American musicians, but by the time they arrived half of the album was already completed. Together they recorded "Suit of Lights" and an outtake called "Baby's Got a Brand New Hairdo". Work with the Attractions was tense, for Costello and the band were drifting apart. Upset at their sidelining, Costello later said: "I think [the situation] put them on edge and made them defensive and hostile, which made me defensive and hostile. The sessions were a disaster." He scrapped any remaining plans to record with the Attractions and failed to inform them, leaving them to spend the remaining time waiting in their Los Angeles hotel for a call that never came.

The sessions overall lasted under three months. According to Costello, most of the songs were mixed at the end of each session. "Little Palaces" was recorded by Costello alone during a separate solo session, with string bass added by Scheff later. At the request of Columbia Records, who failed to hear a single, Costello taped a rendition of the Nina Simone song "Don't Let Me Be Misunderstood" with the Keltner, Scheff and Froom lineup; Michael Blair of Tom Waits' band overdubbed marimba. The album was completed around September 1985, after which Costello toured with the Pogues from October to December.

== Music and lyrics ==
In a departure from his previous albums, King of America represented Costello's foray into roots music, exploring genres such as roots rock, country, country folk, R&B, and Americana. Other commentators found elements of folk, blues, folk rock, pub rock, lounge jazz and late-1950s rockabilly. The album has received musical and lyrical comparisons to the works of Bob Dylan and the Band. (Note: Attributed to multiple references:)

In contrast to the studio-driven production of Costello's previous albums, King of America features a mostly acoustic sound emphasised by stand-up bass, Hammond organ, brushes and rim-shots. The songs themselves, both musically and lyrically, are also simpler than earlier ones. According to the author Graeme Thomson, the artist's complex wordplay was replaced with "a compelling honesty". Costello stated at the time:

Especially on Goodbye Cruel World, I allowed the arrangements to run away with themselves. While on a solo tour last spring, I discovered that a lot of the songs on those records were stronger when played very simply. I vowed never again to fall into the trap of making records that try to sound like the year in which they were recorded.

While the artist denied it was a concept album, many of the album's 15 tracks concern America (United States), offering studies into the American dream from an outsider's point of view. Encompassing descriptions of rejection and isolation ("I'll Wear It Proudly") and confrontation ("Indoor Fireworks"), the songs on King of America are introspective and motivated by romance, with themes of alcoholism, betrayal and venality. "Jack of All Parades" and "I'll Wear It Proudly" were declarations of love for Cait O'Riordan, the bassist of the Pogues. Costello had begun a relationship with her in 1984 following the collapse of his first marriage; O'Riordan co-wrote "Lovable". Other songs offer social commentary ("Little Palaces") and humour ("Glitter Gulch"). The author David Gouldstone notes that the narrators on King of America are "nicer" compared to the ones on records like My Aim Is True (1977), and only three songs are negative ("Indoor Fireworks", "Little Palaces" and "Eisenhower Blues").

=== Side one ===
The opening track, "Brilliant Mistake", is a slow piece that examines the goals and aspirations of pursuing the American dream and the reality of obtaining it. Its verses follow three individuals who, in the words of the author James E. Perone, "suffer from self-delusion". Gouldstone analyses: "America is 'brilliant' because there's so much potential, but a 'mistake' because it's gone so horribly wrong." Perone argues the song could be interpreted as an abandonment of the Elvis Costello persona, which the songwriter possibly believed was a "brilliant mistake". "Lovable" is an up-tempo rockabilly and R&B number about the complexity of love. It features David Hidalgo of Los Lobos on vocal harmonies. "Our Little Angel" is a country number that combines "poetic" lines such as "dress she wears like a question mark" with themes of family protection. It follows a woman in a bar, whom the narrator is protective and sympathetic of.

Costello described his rendition of "Don't Let Me Be Misunderstood" as "a slow [and] violent version". Some commentators interpreted its inclusion as a possible restatement of the shedding of the Elvis Costello persona, as in the past, the artist felt misunderstood as a songwriter and performer. Like Goodbye Cruel World's "Worthless Thing", "Glitter Gulch" acts as an attack on the absurdity of television game shows. The narrator rebels against the host halfway through the song, choosing to be an "outlaw" rather than succumb to the show's silliness. Perone said it was reminiscent of Dylan with its "fast-paced country style" and images of "presumably fictional quirky characters".

"Indoor Fireworks" utilises thematic punning to describe a relationship falling apart, the "fireworks" representing the quarrels between the couple. Written by Costello as a "lament to the end of love", Gouldstone calls it the album's most depressing song. At the time, Mike Gardner of Record Mirror said the track "deftly rakes through the dying embers of a soured but still passionate romance with a pungent aftertaste of defeat and hope". Its arrangement and folk-country hybrid was likened by Perone to the early 1970s works of Gram Parsons. "Little Palaces" is a folk ballad that describes the perils of a working-class family, who abuse their children to express their frustrations. According to Gouldstone, the "little palaces" refer to "the high-rise blocks of flats erected with such high hopes but which have since proved to be so highly disastrous", offering commentary on Britain in the 1980s. It features Costello on mandolin. "I'll Wear It Proudly" is a country-style song with ties to Anglo-American folk music. In it, the narrator describes his obsessive want to be with his lover and pain when she is absent, proclaiming that he would suffer ridicule by wearing the crown of the "king of fools".

=== Side two ===
In "American Without Tears", the narrator, during a visit to America, meets two middle-aged G.I. brides who departed England after the war and have lost their English identities. Gouldstone notes that unlike on Armed Forces (1979), where soldiers were depicted as "stereotypical thugs", the soldiers here are depicted with affection and as "actual human beings". Pitchfork writer Stephen M. Deusner compared Costello's own "loneliness and alienation" to that of the G.I. brides. Perone describes the song as an "easy-going country-Cajun hybrid ballad". It features Jo-El Sonnier on accordion. Costello's rendition of "Eisenhower Blues" offers a look into America during the 1950s from the point of view of a neglected individual. Gouldstone argues the song counterpoints the preceding track by implying that America has not changed in the last thirty years. Perone notes that similar to how Lenoir's original provided commentary on the administration of Dwight D. Eisenhower, Costello's cover could be viewed as commentary on the administration of Ronald Reagan.

"Poisoned Rose" is a jazz, blues and country number that Perone compares to the late-1950s and early-1960s recordings of Patsy Cline. In it, the narrator struggles to live both with and without his lover, being attracted by the beauty and repelled by the "poison". By the end, he learns to live with the pain. "The Big Light" presents a reflection on a hungover morning after a night of heavy drinking. Musically, it is a stylistic blend of Elvis Presley-styled rockabilly, the 1970s and 1980s country-pop of Eddie Rabbitt and the mid-1960s alcohol-centric work of Merle Haggard. Costello described "Jack of All Parades" as "an unapologetic companion" to "I'll Wear It Proudly". A personal love song about "the redemptive power of romance", it contains a shuffle beat led by electric bass and Nieve on piano.

"Suit of Lights" has been widely interpreted as representing "the public burial" of the Elvis Costello persona, and a rebirth for the artist. In the song, Costello "dies" on stage and is dressed in a "suit of lights" that resurrect him as someone new. At the time, Costello said: "It's such an Attractions song. They are the only people on earth who could've played that tune. But that's just ironic, it wasn't deliberate." The closing track, "Sleep of the Just", is "a fragmented dreamlike vignette" concerning the sexual lust of a soldier. Costello said at the time: "It's about hypocrisy. It's just about a soldier whose sister is a porno model and he's standing there all proud and full of himself in his uniform and looking down on her, and all the time, it's her picture that's up on the barracks' wall. It's very simple." Perone argues the song's "almost deliberate unpopishness of the melody" foreshadowed Costello's art songs and chamber music works of the 1990s and 2000s.

== Packaging ==
The front cover is a close-up of a bearded Costello, wearing round, wire-rimmed glasses, a crown speckled with rhinestones and a matching brocade jacket. The author Brian Hinton writes that he appears "sardonic and knowing". Commentators at the time found his look "ridiculous" and "serious", both of which they believed captured the spirit of the material itself. According to Gouldstone, the cover was intended to be "absurd"—a "playful acknowledgement" of the album's title and the line in "I'll Wear It Proudly" in which Costello says he would be gratefully crowned the "king of fools". The author continued that the artwork destroys the preconceptions set by Costello's earlier album covers, which mostly attempted to possess a "great deal of ingenuity" in portraying the image of Elvis Costello: "You just can't take it seriously any longer having laughed at him in this ludicrous fancy-dress." The artwork was photographed in Los Angeles by Terry Donovan, while Costello's son Matthew, who was aged 11 at the time, is credited as "sleeve consultant".

In the album's liner notes, Costello is credited to Declan Patrick Aloysius MacManus (Note: Costello's birth name minus 'Aloysius', which was added as a tribute to comedian Tony Hancock.) for writing credits and as "the Little Hands of Concrete" for performance credits. The latter nickname was given to Costello by his former producer Nick Lowe due to his tendency to frequently break guitar strings. His reversion to his real name was interpreted by Gouldstone as a dissatisfaction with the Elvis Costello persona of the past eight years, writing the artist instead wanted to release a project "without a distorting intermediary" and restart himself anew, showing audiences he was not the same man of his earlier records: an older and happier man compared to the young and angry man. Costello elaborated on the name change shortly after the album's release:

The losing of my name is just a little device to remind people that there was always a human being behind the funny glasses. For the first few records it was such an effective guise, a smokescreen for insecurities and a cover for the public learning process that was forced on me. But then I found that people couldn't rid themselves of their preconceptions and kept looking for things on the later records that just weren't there. Elvis Costello became more and more a character I played because people wouldn't let him grow up.

== Release ==
King of America was originally released on 21 February 1986 exclusively on vinyl formats. In the United Kingdom and Europe (F-Beat ZL 70946), the album was credited to "the Costello Show, featuring the Attractions and the Confederates", while in North America (Columbia FC 40173), it was credited to "the Costello Show featuring Elvis Costello". The label reportedly refused to release the album without including the Costello name. Commercially, King of America reached number 11 on the UK Albums Chart and number 39 on the US Billboard Top Pop Albums chart. It was his first release since My Aim Is True to miss the UK top 10. Elsewhere, the album reached number 12 in Sweden, 21 in New Zealand, 40 in the Netherlands, 41 in Japan and 67 in Australia.

Columbia issued "Don't Let Me Be Misunderstood" as the first single in January 1986, backed by the outtake "Baby's Got a Brand New Hairdo". It peaked at number 33 in the UK and failed to chart on the Billboard Hot 100. "Lovable" appeared in the US only and failed to chart. The album's poor commercial performance led Costello to write songs more akin to his early work with the Attractions, namely This Year's Model (1978) and Armed Forces. He returned to the studio with the Attractions and Nick Lowe in March, quickly recording a new album, Blood & Chocolate, in two months. It was released in September 1986, only seven months after King of America.

== Critical reception ==
Professional ratings
Initial reviews
Review scores
Source	Rating
Record Mirror	5/5 stars
Smash Hits	7/10
Sounds	3.5/5 stars

King of America was acclaimed by critics as a return to form for Costello and his best album in several years. Melody Maker's Nick Kent welcomed King of America as Costello's best work to date alongside Get Happy!!, highlighting Burnett's role as producer and deeming Costello "still this blighted isle's finest songwriter, a force, who at his best, is simply beyond peer". Musician's Scott Isler wrote that "these art-songs re-establish Elvis as a premier jongleur charting the heart of darkness."

According to Thomson, critics praised the record's compassion and warmth, the instrumentation and the quality of the songs. Billboard magazine hailed King of America as possibly "the most accessible, heartfelt songs he's yet written in a spare but rich framework", all 15 songs containing "remarkable depth", resulting in a "timeless" blend of rock, country, blues and pop. Some writers noted the production allowed better lyrical clarity compared to prior releases, giving the vocals more emotional intimacy. Costello's vocal performances were also highlighted. Stephen Holden of The New York Times wrote that "his passionate vocals have a terse, strangulated intensity", one that Creem's Jeff Nesin believed "give[s] the tracks an amazing presence and immediacy". Chris Willman of Los Angeles Times enjoyed the collision of the "coldest" lyrics with the "warmest" musical styles combined with the minimalist arrangements, making for an "alternately brilliant and aggravating LP".

In more mixed assessments, some critics believed the songs were too complex, lacking the accessibility to obtain new fans but would satisfy longtime ones. Ken Tucker of The Philadelphia Inquirer argued King of America is "not the place to start your Elvis Costello collection" and its enjoyment depends on listeners' familiarity with the artist. Tucker also doubted the record's commercial viability in the US, noting that "his music's combination of passion and fussiness is at odds with everything else on the radio". Other reviewers criticised the session players as inferior to the Attractions, acting as simply backup to Costello. Reviewers also criticised King of America for lacking cohesiveness, being too slow-paced, and being "littered with dozens of memorable lines but only a handful of coherent songs".

Other reviewers noted King of America as a transitional album, believing Costello was attempting different genres to see if they were successful, although Geoffrey Himes of The Washington Post argued: "If he persists in this new quest for straightforward, well-rooted songs, his best work is ahead of him." NME's Sean O'Hagan wrote that after years of musical experiments and different personas, Costello had reached a point in his career where he wanted to be himself and sing with his own voice, concluding: "Maybe that's why the first Declan MacManus album is so straightforward and so complex."

In The Village Voice's annual Pazz & Jop critics poll for the year's best albums, King of America finished at number two, behind Paul Simon's Graceland. The album also placed at number five in Melody Maker's album of the year list. (Note: Costello's second 1986 album, Blood & Chocolate, placed at number three.)

== Legacy ==
I think...that pop music would be much healthier if from time to time a record like King of America were a big hit. It would encourage others to be more daring and to work outside of the straitjacket of formats.

— Elvis Costello, 1986

King of America represented a turning point in Costello's career. In the decades following its release, the artist continued separating himself from the British punk and pub rock scene of the 1970s in favour of various musical excursions, experimenting with genres such as classical (The Juliet Letters, Il Sogno), lounge jazz (North), country (The Delivery Man) and Brill Building pop (Painted from Memory). Following Burnett, Costello continued collaborating with other artists, including the Brodsky Quartet, Burt Bacharach, Paul McCartney, Anne Sofie von Otter and the Roots. Deusner contended in 2005 that criticisms of Costello during this time, such as him having a "practiced delivery", "overly calculated songwriting" and an "obsession with backing musicians and collaborators", all originated on King of America, his first album since My Aim Is True without the Attractions as his primary backing group. The same year, Zeth Lundy of PopMatters wrote: "It is the watershed moment where his lifelong fascination with America took on a larger swath of his artistic palette, an obsession that would continue to inform much of his work throughout the late '80s and '90s." The album's experimentations with song structure also anticipated his works in the 2000s. In 2021, Jeb Gottlieb of Ultimate Classic Rock said King of America was "the album [that] opened him up to everything."

=== Retrospective reviews ===
Professional ratings
Retrospective reviews
Review scores
Source	Rating
AllMusic	4.5/5 stars
Blender	5/5 stars
Chicago Tribune	4/4 stars
Christgau's Record Guide	A−
The Encyclopedia of Popular Music	4/5 stars
Entertainment Weekly	A
Pitchfork	8.7/10
Q	5/5 stars
The Rolling Stone Album Guide	5/5 stars
Spin	4/5 stars

Retrospectively, King of America has received praise as one of Costello's finest works, being hailed for the artist's growing maturity, its personal tone, and strong performances. AllMusic editor Stephen Thomas Erlewine declared it one of Costello's masterpieces, comparing it to his previous country-excursion Almost Blue (1981), writing that it "now sounds lived-in and worn, bringing a new emotional depth to the music". Writers for Stereogum called it Costello's most successful genre excursion in 2021. In his book Complicated Shadows, Thomson considers King of America Costello's finest alongside Get Happy!! and Imperial Bedroom (1982). Erlewine and Thomson also highlight the songwriting as some of Costello's best. In his book God's Comic, Gouldstone wrote: "Content and form are in harmony, and the result is an extremely satisfying record." Spin's Al Shipley argued in 2022 that the album's sound pointed to what became alt-country. In 2000, it was voted number 540 in the third edition of writer Colin Larkin's book All Time Top 1000 Albums.

In PopMatters, Lundy cited the "lifeless production" as King of America's primary flaw, writing that "the instruments and Costello's voice are rendered thin as sacrament wafers" and "the entire mix is doused in a questionable amount of reverb". Lundy ultimately called it "a collection of strong songs rendered in an unexciting manner". Perone argues that the fusion of rockabilly, country and other genres make the songs timeless, but the album's "expansiveness" can be too much for listeners in one sitting. Scott Gordon of The A.V. Club stated that without the Attractions, the songwriting appears "almost naked". In a 2005 review for Rolling Stone, Rob Sheffield called the album a "mess", containing eight of the artist's "meatiest songs" and seven others that range from "forced whimsy" to "self-parody".

== Reissues ==
Professional ratings
2005 reissue
Review scores
Source	Rating
Mojo	4/4 stars
PopMatters	6/10
Record Collector	5/5 stars
Rolling Stone	4/5 stars
Uncut	4/5 stars

King of America was first reissued on CD in 1987 by Demon Records. In August 1995, the album was reissued by Demon/Rykodisc with five bonus tracks, including the Coward Brothers single, "The People's Limousine" and "They'll Never Take Her Love from Me", and new liner notes written by Costello himself. Early limited-edition pressings also included a six-track bonus disc of 1986 live recordings by Costello and the Confederates on Broadway.

In April 2005, King of America was remastered and expanded by Rhino Records. The reissue featured new Costello-written liner notes, a new colourised version of the cover artwork and a bonus disc containing 21 tracks, 11 of which featured on the Rykodisc reissue. The ten new tracks included solo demos and early versions of tracks that would appear on later albums, such as "I Hope You're Happy Now" (released on Blood & Chocolate) and "Betrayal" (reworked into "Tramp the Dirt Down" on 1989's Spike). For its release, the reissue came with a promotional sticker that read "The album that fans, critics and Elvis Costello all agree on." The reissue received positive reviews. Commentators highlighted the live tracks by Costello and the Confederates and the solo demos. Sheffield called the reissue superior to the original album.

King of America was reissued again on CD, with no bonus tracks, in June 2007 by Hip-O Records and Universal Music Group. An LP reissue by UM^{e} followed in November 2015, again with no bonus tracks. King of America & Other Realms, a super deluxe box set, was released on 1 November 2024. It is an expanded collection that celebrates Costello's love of Americana music. Featuring 97 tracks across six discs, the box set contains a 2024 remaster of the original King of America album, previously unreleased demos from the recording sessions, a 1987 live concert and collaborations across Costello's entire career. It also features new recordings of "Indoor Fireworks" and "Brilliant Mistake".

== Track listing ==
All tracks are written by Declan MacManus (Elvis Costello) except as noted.

Side one
No.	Title	Writer(s)	Length
1.	"Brilliant Mistake"		3:45
2.	"Lovable"	MacManus, Cait O'Riordan	2:53
3.	"Our Little Angel"		4:06
4.	"Don't Let Me Be Misunderstood"	Bennie Benjamin, Sol Marcus, Gloria Caldwell	3:22
5.	"Glitter Gulch"		3:17
6.	"Indoor Fireworks"		4:10
7.	"Little Palaces"		3:49
8.	"I'll Wear It Proudly"		4:25
Total length:			29:47

Side two
No.	Title	Writer(s)	Length
9.	"American Without Tears"		4:34
10.	"Eisenhower Blues"	J. B. Lenoir	3:46
11.	"Poisoned Rose"		4:07
12.	"The Big Light"		2:33
13.	"Jack of All Parades" (Featuring the Attractions & the Confederates)		5:18
14.	"Suit of Lights" (Featuring the Attractions)		4:06
15.	"Sleep of the Just"		3:51
Total length:			28:15

1995 Rykodisc Extended Play
No.	Title	Length
16.	"The People's Limousine"	3:42
17.	"They'll Never Take Her Love from Me"	2:51
18.	"Suffering Face"	3:06
19.	"Shoes Without Heels"	4:16
20.	"King of Confidence"	2:43
Total length:		77:14

2005 Rhino Bonus Disc
No.	Title	Length
1.	"Having It All" (Solo Demo)	3:57
2.	"Suffering Face" (Solo Demo)	3:08
3.	"Deportee" (Solo Demo)	3:35
4.	"Indoor Fireworks" (Solo Demo)	3:49
5.	"I Hope You're Happy Now" (Solo Demo, B-side of "I Want You")	3:06
6.	"Poisoned Rose" (Solo Demo)	4:12
7.	"I'll Wear It Proudly" (Solo Demo)	3:25
8.	"Jack of All Parades" (Solo Demo)	3:32
9.	"The People's Limousine" (The Coward Brothers)	3:42
10.	"They'll Never Take Her Love from Me" (The Coward Brothers)	2:54
11.	"King of Confidence" (Outtake)	2:48
12.	"Shoes Without Heels" (B-side of "Blue Chair")	4:20
13.	"End of the Rainbow" (Solo Demo)	3:27
14.	"Betrayal" (Outtake, featuring the Attractions)	2:24
15.	"That's How You Got Killed Before" (Live at the Broadway Theater, New York City, 23 October 1986)	3:13
16.	"The Big Light" (Live)	3:08
17.	"It Tears Me Up" (Live)	3:26
18.	"The Only Daddy That'll Walk the Line" (Live)	2:42
19.	"Your Mind Is on Vacation/Your Funeral My Trial" (Live)	5:16
20.	"That's How You Got Killed Before (Reprise)" (Live)	7:00
21.	"True Love Ways" (Live)	3:32

== Personnel ==
According to the 1995 liner notes:

- Elvis Costello (credited as "the Little Hands of Concrete") – lead vocal, acoustic guitar, electric guitar, mandolin
- T Bone Burnett – guitars, backing vocals
- Mitchell Froom – Hammond organ, harpsichord, organ, doctored piano
- Tom "T-Bone" Wolk – electric guitar, piano accordion, electric bass
- Jerry Scheff – string bass, electric bass
- Mickey Curry – brushes, drums, sticks

Additional personnel

- Michael Blair – marimba
- James Burton – electric guitar, dobro, acoustic guitar
- Tom Canning – piano
- Ralph Carney – saxophone
- Jim Keltner – drums, sticks, brushes
- Earl Palmer – drums, brushes
- Ron Tutt – drums, brushes
- Ray Brown – double bass ("Eisenhower Blues" and "Poisoned Rose")
- David Hidalgo – harmony vocal ("Lovable")
- Jo-El Sonnier – French accordion ("American Without Tears")
- Steve Nieve – piano, Hammond organ ("Jack of All Parades" and "Suit of Lights")
- Bruce Thomas – electric bass ("Suit of Lights")
- Pete Thomas – drums, sticks ("Suit of Lights")

Technical

- J. Henry (T Bone) Burnett – producer
- Declan Patrick Aloysius MacManus – producer
- Larry Kalman Hirsch – engineer
- David Brent Miner – associate producer
- Terence Daniel Donovan – photography
- Michael Sören Krage – design and typography
- Matthew Patrick Declan MacManus – sleeve consultant

== Charts ==
Chart performance for King of America
Chart (1986)	Peak Position
Australian Albums (Kent Music Report)	67
Japanese Albums (Oricon)	41
Dutch Albums (MegaCharts)	40
New Zealand Albums (RIANZ)	21
Swedish Albums (Sverigetopplistan)	12
UK Albums Chart	11
US Billboard Top Pop Albums	39

== Certifications ==
Sales certifications for King of America
Region	Certification	Certified units/sales
United Kingdom (BPI)	Silver	60,000^{^}
^{^} Shipments figures based on certification alone.
