= Blue Chair =

Song

Song by Elvis Costello and the Attractions

from the album Blood & Chocolate
- Released: 15 September 1986
- Recorded: March–May 1986
- Genre: New wave
- Length: 3:42
- Label: Demon
- Songwriter: Elvis Costello
- Producers: Nick Lowe; Colin Fairley

"Blue Chair"

Single by Elvis Costello
- B-side: "American Without Tears No. 2 (Twilight Version)"
- Released: January 1987
- Recorded: August–September 1985; January 1987
- Length: 3:39
- Label: Demon
- Producers: Elvis Costello; T-Bone Burnett

Elvis Costello singles chronology
"I Want You" (1986)	"Blue Chair" (1987)	"A Town Called Big Nothing" (1987)

"Blue Chair" is a song written by the English singer-songwriter Elvis Costello and recorded by Costello with his backing band the Attractions. The song first appeared on Costello's 1986 album, Blood & Chocolate. First intended for Costello's previous album King of America, the song was scrapped during that session and reworked with the Attractions around Steve Nieve's piano part.

After the song appeared as an album track on Blood and Chocolate, Costello reworked the earlier King of America track and released it as a solo single in 1987. The single reached number 94 in Britain. Since its release, the song has been lauded by critics.

== Background ==
"Blue Chair" was first written by Costello for his 1986 album King of America. Costello attempted to record a version of the song with his longstanding backing band, the Attractions, but deemed this version "lacklustre" and scrapped it. Costello then attempted it with the Confederates, a collection of studio musicians with whom he recorded most of King of America. Per Costello, this version remained in the tentative running order for King of America for a long time, but was scrapped late into the album's assembly because "it seemed brash and too eager to please without really doing so." The demo was released on the King of America & Other Realms box set in November 2024.

Costello commented in a 1986 interview:

If I was only interested in hits, we'd have put out "Blue Chair". We had a version of that that sounded to most people like a Top 10 American hit, but I left it off the album because I just didn't think we'd got it right. It lacked a bit of soul, somehow. So I'd rather wait, to get it right.

During the sessions for Costello's next album, Blood & Chocolate, he revived the song. Having reunited with the Attractions for the album, Costello and the band rearranged the song around Steve Nieve's piano part. Costello noted that this "fully realized" new arrangement was inspired by Prince's songs "Manic Monday" and "Raspberry Beret."

== Release ==
"Blue Chair" was first released on Blood & Chocolate in September 1986. Though this version was not released as a single, Costello returned again to the track after the two singles from Blood & Chocolate, "Tokyo Storm Warning" and "I Want You", underachieved commercially. Costello explained,

After the unsurprising commercial failures of both the six minute-plus Blood and Chocolate singles, I decided to look again at the "Blue Chair" backing track scrapped during the King of America sessions. Turning up Mitchell Froom's organ and T-Bone Wolk's overdubbed Telecaster part we filled out some of the space above T-Bone and Mickey Curry's bass and drums. I then re-cut the lead vocal and added a vocal arrangement that took a very distant cue from Sly's "Everyday People".

This new recording of "Blue Chair" was released as a single in January 1987. The single did not reverse Costello's commercial fortunes, only reaching number 94 on the UK charts. This version would appear on the rarities album Out of Our Idiot later that same year, as well as on later expanded editions of Blood & Chocolate.

== Critical reception ==
"Blue Chair" has received critical acclaim since its release. Barry Gutman of the East Coast Rocker described the song as "poppy" in a 1986 article, noting that the song was reminiscent of Costello's 1979 album Armed Forces. Retrospectively, David Gorman of Trunkworthy praised the song as one he could "listen to a dozen times in a row," singling out the single rerecording as his preferred version, asserting that it features "the best singing the man has ever done." Diffuser.fm cited the song as an example of "pretty melodic stuff" on Blood & Chocolate, while Stereogum named it one of the "sneering gems" on the album.

== Charts ==
Chart (1987)	Peak position
UK Singles (Official Charts)	94
