= Brilliant Mistake =

- Artwork for the 2005 single

Song by Elvis Costello

from the album King of America
- Released: 21 February 1986
- Recorded: July–September 1985
- Studio: Ocean Way, Sunset Sound, & Sound Factory Studio, Los Angeles
- Genre: Roots rock; folk rock
- Label: F-Beat (UK); Columbia (US)
- Songwriter(s): Elvis Costello
- Producer(s): T Bone Burnett

Elvis Costello singles chronology
"Monkey to Man" (2004)	"Brilliant Mistake" (2005)	"No Hiding Place" (2008)

"Brilliant Mistake" is a song by the English singer-songwriter Elvis Costello that was first released on his 1986 album King of America. Written about Costello's experiences in America, the song features introspective lyrics and a performance from the Confederates, who performed on the track after his usual backing band the Attractions could not perform to Costello's liking.

Released on King of America as the opening track, the song has since seen positive reception from critics and has appeared on compilation albums.

== Background ==
Costello first came up with the title of "Brilliant Mistake" in a conversation with David Was of Was (Not Was), who Costello had collaborated with to write "Shadows And Jimmy" for the latter's 1988 album What Up, Dog?. They had been discussing Costello's experiences in America; he later described the track as "about being deluded or imagining a life in exile".

Lyrically, the song continues what Costello describes as continuing the "theme of exile and a simultaneous attraction and repulsion to an ideal" that he cites as defining the King of America album. The song also contains the title lyric for its parent album, King of America; in the song, the "King" falls in love with a woman who works "for the ABC News / It was as much of the alphabet as she knew how to use". Costello later explained the song's meaning,

It's a sad song, but it's also sort of funny. It's about America and it's about lost ambition, not lack of inspiration. It's about a disappointed or frustrated belief. It's a song that people are going to read wrong. One line in it is, 'There's a trick they do with mirrors and with chemicals.' It means celluloid and mirrors, movie cameras. It occurred to me the other day that people will think it's a reference to cocaine. I could have written a big song about America, like Paul Simon's 'American Tune'. But I think 'Brilliant Mistake' is more like 'Peace Like a River', a personal thing in the face of a big disappointing artifice.

== Recording ==
"Brilliant Mistake" was first attempted by Costello in his sessions with his longstanding backing band the Attractions. Costello had already recorded half of the King of America album without them, rendering the recording sessions tense. Costello had expected for the Attractions to perform on the song, but he expressed disappointment with their performance, saying, "I had little patience for our failure to get to grips with the one song I had been certain would suit the band's sound and was fast becoming the session's theme song: 'Brilliant Mistake'. ... Despite any other departures, I wanted to lead off with an Attractions recording. This was not to be".

The final version would be recorded with the Confederates, Costello's backing band throughout the album that included members of the TCB Band. Drummer Mickey Curry played with brushes on the track, while Jerry Scheff played string bass and future Costello producer Mitchell Froom played organ and harpsichord. T-Bone Wolk, played Fender Telecaster and accordion.

== Release and reception ==
"Brilliant Mistake" was released as the opening track to the King of America album in February 1986. Costello explained, "Apart from the lyric providing the album's title, I had always seen this song as the record's opening track". The track was not initially released as a single, but it saw a single release in 2005 with a cover of Buddy Holly's "True Love Ways" on the B-side. The track also appeared on Girls Girls Girls, of which he joked, "At best ['Brilliant Mistake'] might be called the title track of the collection".

"Brilliant Mistake" has since seen critical acclaim. Pitchfork Media praised the song as one of the songs on the album "imbued" with "barbed wit and acid humor", while AllMusic noted that Costello "rarely got better" than on the track. Salon dubbed it "a hugely ambitious song that eviscerates, in vertiginous order, the American way of life, romance and then the singer's personality itself". Ed Masley of The Arizona Republic called it "prime Costello, a reflective gem".

Jim Beviglia of American Songwriter named it Costello's 13th best song, saying "'Brilliant Mistake' may indeed be an affectionate send-up of the land of the free, but it's also a moving portrait of a man lost in translation". Dave Lifton of Ultimate Classic Rock ranked it as Costello's 8th best, while Martin Chilton of the Daily Telegraph named it his 17th best.

The song was also the title track for the Broadway tribute Brilliant Mistake: Broadway Sings Elvis Costello.

A new 2024 recording of "Brilliant Mistake" was released on the super deluxe box set King of America & Other Realms on 1 November 2024, along with a demo and a new remaster of the original recording. Costello said of the 2024 remake's new arrangement is "over a habanera rhythm in a minor key to mark the dark passing of the years and our elusive hold on hope, taking a detour into the 1933 Harry Warren/Al Dubin song 'Boulevard of Broken Dreams', rather than just alluding to it in the lyric of the last verse."
