= Blood & Chocolate =

Studio album by Elvis Costello and the Attractions
- Released: 15 September 1986
- Recorded: March–May 1986
- Studio: Olympic (London)
- Genres: Rock and roll; hard rock; garage rock
- Length: 47:48
- Labels: Demon; Columbia
- Producer: Nick Lowe

Elvis Costello and the Attractions chronology
King of America (1986)	Blood & Chocolate (1986)	Out of Our Idiot (1987)

Singles from Blood & Chocolate
- 1. "Tokyo Storm Warning" Released: August 1986; 2. "I Want You" Released: October 1986

Blood & Chocolate is the eleventh studio album by the English singer-songwriter Elvis Costello, and his ninth album with the Attractions—keyboardist Steve Nieve, bassist Bruce Thomas and drummer Pete Thomas (no relation). It was released on 15 September 1986 through Demon and Columbia Records. After mostly using outside musicians for his previous album King of America, Costello reunited the Attractions and his former producer Nick Lowe for Blood & Chocolate. Recorded in London during a period of heightened tensions between Costello and the Attractions, the tracks were recorded quickly, mostly live in first takes, while the band were set up simultaneously in the same room at Olympic Studios. Costello's then-girlfriend, Cait O'Riordan of the Pogues, sang backing vocals on two tracks and co-wrote another.

A departure from the roots rock of King of America, Blood & Chocolate musically and lyrically recalls Costello's early works, particularly This Year's Model (1978). Featuring a garage-sounding production, it is a straightforward rock and roll album with revenge and guilt-driven lyrics and imagery drawn from nightmarish worlds. After King of America was credited to "the Costello Show", Blood & Chocolate was credited once again to "Elvis Costello and the Attractions". The cover artwork is a painting by Costello himself titled "Napoleon Dynamite".

Released only seven months after King of America, Blood & Chocolate was Costello's lowest-charting album yet, reaching number 16 in the UK and number 84 in the US. Both of its over six-minute singles—"Tokyo Storm Warning" and "I Want You"—performed poorly. At the time, music critics considered the album substandard compared to Costello's previous works, though others deemed it a return to form for the artist. Retrospective reviews consider Blood & Chocolate one of Costello's finest, being praised for its simplicity and performances. Following the album's release and supporting tour, Costello did not work with the Attractions again for eight years. It has been reissued several times with bonus tracks, including in 1995 and 2002.

== Background ==
Elvis Costello recorded his tenth studio album King of America in Los Angeles between July and September 1985. A roots rock and Americana album, it was recorded in collaboration with T Bone Burnett and various American session musicians dubbed "the Confederates". Costello had intended for his regular backing band, the Attractions, to appear on half of the album, but by the time they arrived half of the album was already completed. The Attractions were upset at their sidelining, leading to tense sessions; they ultimately appeared on only one track, "Suit of Lights". Released in February 1986, King of America sold poorly and was Costello's first album since My Aim Is True (1977) to miss the UK top 10. The album's poor commercial performance led Costello to write songs more akin to his early work with the Attractions, namely This Year's Model (1978) and Armed Forces (1979).

== Recording ==
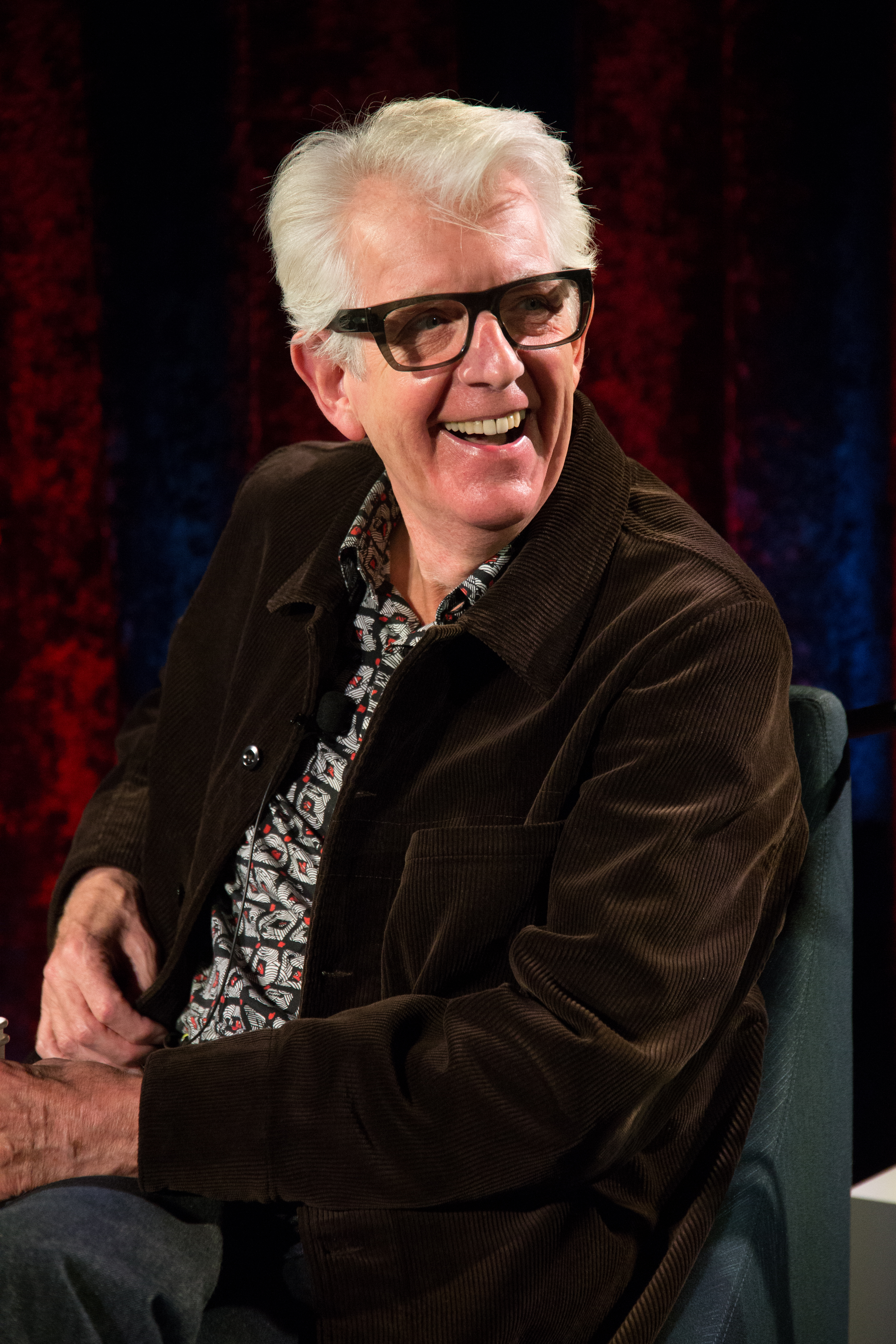
Blood & Chocolate was produced by Nick Lowe (pictured in 2017), who had not produced a Costello album since 1981's Trust.

Only six months after the Los Angeles sessions for King of America, Costello entered Olympic Studios in London with the Attractions—the keyboardist Steve Nieve, the bassist Bruce Thomas and the drummer Pete Thomas (no relation)—to record an album. The musician Nick Lowe acted as producer for the first time in five years, while Colin Fairley was engineer. Lowe was reportedly brought back due to his history with the band—he had produced Costello's first four albums with the Attractions—and his ability to capture the raw sound Costello desired for the project. Costello wrote new songs using both guitar and simply beating his hands on a table to find rhythms; "Blue Chair", "I Hope You're Happy Now" and "Next Time Round" were held over from the King of America sessions. The songs fit the simplistic style of his working relationship with the Attractions, often only featuring two or three chords. A one-off session at London's Eden Studios with Jimmy Cliff yielded a track called "Seven Day Weekend" for the film Club Paradise (1986).

The recording sessions lasted from March to May 1986. With tensions still high between Costello and the Attractions, the goal was to record the tracks as quickly as possible before the animosity between Costello and the band became so severe they would have to scrap the entire project. The band set up in the studio similar to a rehearsal space, reportedly up to 25 feet between the bass and drums, and used monitor speakers rather than headphones, meaning there was little separation between the instruments. Costello remembered: "This made for a booming, murky sound that made subtlety impossible." The author Graeme Thomson argued: "It was a unique approach, essentially like recording a live concert in a cavernous studio with a few microphones dotted around the room." The album was recorded at high volume like a live concert, in a way Costello felt suited the material. The band recorded most of the songs live in first takes, and a maximum of three takes, while overdubs were limited to lead or harmony vocal retakes. Costello stated in 1995: "We set up and played as loud as we did on stage. It didn't really sound like This Year's Model, but the component parts were just the four of us, and we did very few overdubs. We played as much a combo sound as possible."

The experience did little to ease the tensions in the band. Lowe remembered it was "a much more uptight situation ... There wasn't such a gang feeling." Nevertheless, Lowe admitted to encouraging the tensions, believing they "added to" the recording environment. Lowe also provided acoustic guitar on several numbers. Costello used his Telecaster guitar, which he felt gave his parts "a very harsh edge". He also restricted Nieve's parts to organ and piano, with zero solos. Costello's then-girlfriend Cait O'Riordan, the bassist for the Pogues, was present during recording, providing backing vocals on "Poor Napoleon" and "Crimes of Paris", and co-wrote "Tokyo Storm Warning" with Costello. The band also recorded a cover of Little Willie John's "Leave My Kitten Alone" (1959), which was left off the final album.

== Music and lyrics ==
Departing from the roots rock of King of America, Blood & Chocolate is a rock 'n' roll and hard rock record, with a back-to-basics organ and guitar-led sound reminiscent of This Year's Model. In his book The Words and Music of Elvis Costello, the author James E. Perone describes the album as "noisy, messy, loose and at times under-rehearsed sounding". The album has also been classified as new wave and identified by later reviewers as featuring an early grunge sound. Other writers for Stereogum said the record offers a "terrific pub-rocking gut punch". Joe Pelone of punknews.org summarised: "Blood & Chocolate is a lot of things. On some tracks, it's a return to early Costello's hard charged literate punk. Sometimes it combines that with the pop sensibilities Costello cultivated over the years." Thomson argues that the album title, Blood & Chocolate, "perfectly summed up the texture of the music".

Lyrically, Blood & Chocolate represents a return to the more revenge and guilt-driven lyrics of Costello's earlier releases. In Blender magazine, Douglas Wolk detailed "blistering songs about sexual despair and disgust". Several songs contain imagery drawn from nightmarish worlds, offering "surreal snatches of stories detailing the dark agonies wreaked on a tortured soul by a Love Gone Mad." Thomson splits the record in two: "The repetitive, mono-rhythmic nightmares" of tracks like "Uncomplicated" and "Honey, Are You Straight or Are You Blind?"; and "the brighter pop" of tracks like "Blue Chair" and "Next Time Round". On the record's original release, Robert Hilburn of the Los Angeles Times said that "one of the album's central themes is man's capacity to endure. There are people and situations in Blood & Chocolate as dark, despairing and hopeless as those in [Bruce] Springsteen's Nebraska (1982). Still, life goes on."

=== Side one ===
"Uncomplicated" utilises a "lumbering" beat that conveys a "feeling of monotony and claustrophobia". Its lyrics, offering themes of love, disgust, revenge and passion, were interpreted by Perone as detailing a relationship with a controlling man. "I Hope You're Happy Now" was compared by the author David Gouldstone to This Year's Model's "No Action", wherein the narrator condemns his ex-lover and her new partner. The biographer Brian Hinton stated it is a "song of jealousy" that is "lovingly sung". Perone says the instrumental performance, "a Wall of Sound-like block of rock band texture", highlights the anger of the lyrics. The over six-minute "Tokyo Storm Warning" lacks a narrative, instead presenting various snapshots of an apocalyptic and frightening world on the brink of collapse where people live for the moment and fail to consider consequences for their actions. Hilburn interprets the track as wanting the listener to "find order and balance among the confusion and chaos". The track also contains imagery detailing less-appealing aspects of 1980s society, as well as images of KKK-infested Montgomery and the Malvinas. Costello described it as a "protest song".

"Home Is Anywhere You Hang Your Head" features similar themes as Costello's early albums, following a man abandoned by his lover, who has rejected him. Perone describes it as a conventional pop song compared to the previous track, and "less hard-hitting", drawing comparisons to "the aesthetics" of Imperial Bedroom (1982). "I Want You" follows the narrator's "stalker-like obsession" with his departed lover. Variously described as a "slow walk" and "an extended psychosexual drama", it begins quietly before growing in intensity as the narrator harbours feelings of resentment, jealousy, lust and anger towards her, further revealing darker and more obsessive qualities over its six-minute runtime. By the end, the character's declarations of "I want you" turn into weeps, closing with Costello's voice alone. The track's instrumental builds to match the narrator's anger. Several commentators have compared the song's setting and style to the Beatles' "I Want You (She's So Heavy)" (1969).

=== Side two ===
"Honey, Are You Straight or Are You Blind?" is a rock and roll and blues song that is more lively and cheerful compared to "I Want You". In it, the narrator's lover is jealous of a perceived affair between him and another woman. "Blue Chair" is a power pop track that Costello said took musical inspiration from Prince for its arrangement. Taking place in a pub, a man informs the narrator that his lover has begun an affair with the man; the narrator is supportive rather than resentful. Hinton interprets the "blue chair" as possibly "therapy, or drink, or drugged oblivion". The track possesses irony and different vocal tones between the choruses and verses offer contrasting moods. "Battered Old Bird" observes the beaten-down occupants of a run-down boarding house. Costello said that it was partially based on real people from his childhood. Its music features changes in volume and intensity, using various studio effects through tape manipulation.

"Crimes of Paris" is a cryptic song that dissects themes of troubled relationships with a sing-along chorus. Perone likens its musical setting to UK pub rock, with its largely acoustic backing and harmony vocals between Costello and O'Riordan suggesting a live band in a pub. "Poor Napoleon" continues the theme of sexual jealousy, following "a proud and vain character" who finds his love "fatally compromised". Hinton says O'Riordan appears as "the voice of pity". It features an unconventional song structure, with the number of syllables in each line varying from verse to verse. "Next Time Round", with themes of regret, anger and resentfulness, is about a narrator who overhears his lover having an affair and wishes he could still have her. A British Invasion-style rock song, Perone likens the production to the works of Bruce Springsteen and the E Street Band in the latter half of the 1970s.

== Title and packaging ==
The album's title, the first lyric of "Uncomplicated", came from an incident that occurred on the 1977 Live Stiffs Tour when the tour's manager Les Brown was assaulted by some of the musicians. Hilburn argued that the title "underscores the way things are often far different from their appearances: In some settings, blood and chocolate look the same." Similar to King of America, Costello uses three different names to credit himself on Blood & Chocolate: his given name of Declan MacManus; his stage name of Elvis Costello; and the nickname Napoleon Dynamite, his alter ego as master of ceremonies for the Attractions' spinning songbook tour. While King of America had been credited to "the Costello Show", Blood & Chocolate reverts to the former credit of Elvis Costello and the Attractions. Hilburn believed the reversion to Costello's stage name was for "greater consumer recognition".

The album's cover artwork is a painting, titled "Napoleon Dynamite", by Costello himself, credited to an alter ego named Eammon Singer. Hinton says the sleeve is of Napoleon Dynamite, with the back containing photos of the band by Keith Morris, in which they are lit from the right. The album uses Esperanto to list musician credits and LP sides, to which Costello stated in the 1995 liner notes "for reasons I can no longer remember".

== Release and promotion ==
Blood & Chocolate was released on 15 September 1986, only seven months after King of America. It arrived on LP, CD and cassette formats, the last of which was packaged as a red and gold pastiche of a Cadbury's Bourneville bar. Demon Records (XFIEND 80) handled its distribution in the United Kingdom (Demon IMP for its CD release), while Columbia Records (Columbia 40518) handled distribution in the United States. It became Costello's lowest-charting album up to that point in both countries, reaching number 16 in the UK and number 84 in the US. It also reached the top 20 in the Netherlands and Sweden. According to Costello, Columbia "hated it and subsequently just fucking buried it"; Blood & Chocolate was Costello's final album with the label.

"Tokyo Storm Warning" and "I Want You" were released as singles in August and October 1986, respectively, both through Costello's own IMP label. (Note: The 7" singles featured both tracks split into two parts across the A- and B-sides. For the 12" formats, the outtake "Black Sails in the Sunset" was the B-side for "Tokyo Storm Warning", while "I Hope You're Happy Now" was the B-side for "I Want You".) The former reached number 73 in the UK, his worst performing single up to that point. Costello later said: "I was always surprised it wasn't a hit. But maybe releasing this and 'I Want You' – six-minute singles, back to back – wasn't the way to do it!" "I Want You" later became a live favourite. A new recording of "Blue Chair" was later released as a single in January 1987, backed by "American Without Tears No. 2 (Twilight Version)", a sequel to the King of America track.

Costello planned an ambitious tour with both the Attractions and the Confederates—the group of American session musicians that played on King of America—in the US and Europe, intended to juxtapose the different styles on both King of America and Blood & Chocolate. The tour, which ran from October to December 1986, featured a variety of setlists and songs played in vastly different styles than their released versions. The shows featured the Attractions, the Confederates (in the US only), the Coward Brothers (Costello and T Bone Burnett) and Costello solo. In late January 1987, Costello performed a six-night residency at the Royal Albert Hall in London, three with the Attractions and three with the Confederates.

== Critical reception ==
Professional ratings
Initial reviews
Review scores
Source	Rating
Q	3/5 stars
Record Mirror	3.5/4 stars
Smash Hits	7/10
Sounds	3.5/5 stars
The Village Voice	A−

Blood & Chocolate received mixed-to-positive reviews on release. Acknowledged as Costello's most musically straightforward album in many years, with musical and lyrical comparisons to This Year's Model and Armed Forces. In Los Angeles Times, Robert Hilburn summarised: "If you were a fan of Elvis Costello's late-'70s albums, from My Aim Is True through Armed Forces, the new Blood & Chocolate is the LP you've been waiting seven years for him to deliver." The return to the punch and anger of Costello's early works was both welcomed and derided. Its back-to-basics approach was also compared to Talking Heads' recently released Little Creatures (1985).

Several reviewers criticised Blood & Chocolate as substandard compared to Costello's previous works. Writing for Creem, Iman Lababedi felt Blood & Chocolate "feels like a holding action" following the "masterpiece" King of America. Stuart Bailie of Record Mirror described Blood & Chocolate as a "predictable" record that is "decent" compared to other artists, "but we all know that this man can do a lot better". Some predicted the album would fail to attract new fans beyond Costello's most loyal ones. Others felt it was a return to form for Costello following Punch the Clock (1983) and Goodbye Cruel World (1984), with quality comparisons to Trust (1981). Musician's Jon Young described Blood & Chocolate as Costello's "equivalent" of Bob Dylan's Blonde on Blonde (1966) and an "essential" Costello record.

The album's garage-sounding production received mixed reactions. In High Fidelity, David Browne felt the Attractions sounded muffled due to the blend of instruments creating "a rushed, underrehearsed jumble of guitars, drums, and organs". Adrian Thrills wrote in the NME that the production makes Blood & Chocolate "the most un-easy listening LP in the entire Costello canon". In Sounds magazine, Richard Cook felt the production made Nieve's contributions almost transparent and pushed Costello's voice up to the forefront; Costello's vocal performance did receive positive reactions. Others deemed the lyrics too complicated, jumbled and messy to enjoy; Q's Mark Cooper said "the wordplay is too clever for many of the songs' emotional good". Cook also criticised the return to older lyrical themes. Several critics also singled out "I Want You" as one of the album's highlights.

In The Village Voice's annual Pazz & Jop critics poll for the year's best albums, Blood & Chocolate finished at number 9. The album also placed at number three in Melody Maker's album of the year list. (Note: Costello's other 1986 album, King of America, placed at number five.) NME placed it at number 13 in their end-of-year list.

== Legacy ==
In a retrospective article Ultimate Classic Rock's Courtney E. Smith described Blood & Chocolate as an "end-of-an-era record". Costello reported the relationship between him and the Attractions as having "soured", and after the album's supporting tour, Costello did not work with the band again for another eight years, until 1994's Brutal Youth, and they were not credited on another LP cover until 1996's All This Useless Beauty. Blood & Chocolate was also Costello's final collaboration with Nick Lowe and his final album with Columbia. Following his departure from the label, he signed a new record deal with Warner Bros., whom he released his next six albums with. The Radiohead singer Thom Yorke said Blood & Chocolate changed how he approached recording and writing music and lyrics.

=== Retrospective reviews ===
Professional ratings
Retrospective reviews
Review scores
Source	Rating
AllMusic	4/5 stars
Blender	5/5 stars
Chicago Tribune	3.5/4 stars
The Encyclopedia of Popular Music	3/5 stars
Entertainment Weekly	A−
Mojo	5/5 stars
punknews.org	4/5 stars
The Rolling Stone Album Guide	4.5/5 stars

Retrospectively, Blood & Chocolate has ranked as one of Costello's finest records. Perone and Pelone commented on its underproduced nature during a period of "glossy '80s" production, the former believing the production "unwittingly predicting the sound of '90s rock production". The record was called "a shining achievement in Costello's vast discography" by Pelone, and a "tour-de-force" that is "one of the artist's best and surliest rock albums" by Stereogum.

Critics have highlighted the album's simplicity and name several tracks as some of Costello's finest, including "Uncomplicated", "Tokyo Storm Warning", "I Hope You're Happy Now" and "I Want You". The band's performances were praised for their energy, although several agreed the album loses steam by its second half. Thomson wrote that "as an extended mood piece it worked brilliantly, but Blood & Chocolate required an element of faith from the listener". Writing for Mojo magazine in 2002, Jim Irvin agreed, finding that "the band's diminished enthusiasm is often audible, the claustrophobia's genuinely uncomfortable, and this time much of the hatred is directed inward." AllMusic editor Stephen Thomas Erlewine found that despite its mean-spirited nature, Blood & Chocolate is "lively" and "frequently compelling".

In the context of Costello's entire career, Perone argued that Costello's sudden departure from the roots rock of King of America to the hard rock of Blood & Chocolate foreshadowed the abrupt excursions between rock, country, jazz and classical music he undertook later in his career. Discussing Costello's subsequent records, Q's Tom Doyle found that Blood & Chocolate "has a weight and energy that was sorely lacking from much of the post-Attractions work that followed and is testament to the controlled power of their garage band sound."

In 2000, Blood & Chocolate was voted number 475 in the third edition of Colin Larkin's book All Time Top 1000 Albums. In 2013, NME placed the album at number 483 in their list of the 500 Greatest Albums of All Time. The album was also included in the 2006 book 1001 Albums You Must Hear Before You Die.

== Reissues ==
Professional ratings
2002 reissue
Review scores
Source	Rating
Q	4/5 stars
Uncut	4/5 stars

Blood & Chocolate was reissued by Demon/Rykodisc in September 1995 with six bonus tracks, including the 1987 single version of "Blue Chair". It was reissued again in February 2002 by Rhino Records. This release included five of the six Rykodisc bonus tracks, minus "A Town Called Big Nothing", along with ten others, including unreleased songs, B-sides, covers (including "Seven Day Weekend" and "Leave My Kitten Alone") and alternate versions of previously released tracks.

Blood & Chocolate was reissued again on CD, with no bonus tracks, in June 2007 by Hip-O Records and Universal Music Group. An LP reissue by UM^{e} followed in November 2015, again with no bonus tracks.

== Track listing ==
All tracks are written by Declan MacManus (Elvis Costello), unless otherwise noted

Side one: Flanko Uno
No.	Title	Writer(s)	Length
1.	"Uncomplicated"		3:26
2.	"I Hope You're Happy Now"		3:07
3.	"Tokyo Storm Warning"	MacManus, Cait O'Riordan	6:25
4.	"Home Is Anywhere You Hang Your Head"		5:07
5.	"I Want You"		6:45

Side two: Flanko Du
No.	Title	Length
6.	"Honey, Are You Straight or Are You Blind"	2:09
7.	"Blue Chair"	3:42
8.	"Battered Old Bird"	5:51
9.	"Crimes of Paris"	4:20
10.	"Poor Napoleon"	3:23
11.	"Next Time Round"	3:28
Total length:		47:48

Rykodisc Extended Play
No.	Title	Writer(s)	Length
12.	"Seven Day Weekend" (with Jimmy Cliff, from the motion picture soundtrack Club Paradise)	Costello, Cliff	2:36
13.	"Forgive Her Anything"		3:11
14.	"Blue Chair" (Single Version)		3:38
15.	"Baby's Got a Brand New Hairdo" (B-side of "Don't Let Me Be Misunderstood")		3:23
16.	"American Without Tears No.2" (Twilight Version, B-side of "Blue Chair")		3:33
17.	"A Town Called Big Nothing (Really Big Nothing)"		5:44
18.	"Return to Big Nothing" (Unlisted)		2:54
Total length:			73:47

2002 Rhino reissue Bonus Disc
No.	Title	Writer(s)	Length
1.	"Leave My Kitten Alone"	Little Willie John, Titus Turner, James McDougal	3:24
2.	"New Rhythm Method"		2:30
3.	"Forgive Her Anything" (New Version)		3:51
4.	"Crimes of Paris" (Electric Version)		4:37
5.	"Uncomplicated" (Alternate Version)		3:06
6.	"Battered Old Bird" (Alternate Version)		4:24
7.	"Seven Day Weekend" (with Jimmy Cliff, from the motion picture soundtrack Club Paradise)	Costello, Cliff	2:36
8.	"Blue Chair" (Single Version)		3:41
9.	"Baby's Got a Brand New Hairdo" (B-side of "Don't Let Me Be Misunderstood")		3:25
10.	"American Without Tears No. 2" (Twilight Version, B-side of "Blue Chair")		3:35
11.	"All These Things"	Allen Toussaint	3:04
12.	"Pouring Water on a Drowning Man"	Danny McCormick, Drew Baker	2:34
13.	"Running Out of Fools"	Kay Rogers, Richard Ahlert	2:35
14.	"Tell Me Right Now"	Joe Tex	3:05
15.	"Lonely Blue Boy"	Ben Weisman, Fred Wise	2:04

== Personnel ==
According to the liner notes, except where noted:

- Elvis Costello – vocals, electric guitar, acoustic guitar; bellows (4), canes (4), knives (4), Vox Continental electric organ (6), harmonium (8), bass guitar (10), tambourine (10)
- Steve Nieve – piano, organ
- Bruce Thomas – bass guitar, saxophone
- Pete Thomas – drums, saxophone

Additional personnel

- Nick Lowe – acoustic guitar (4–7, 11)
- Cait O'Riordan – vocals (9, 10)

Technical

- Nick Lowe – producer
- Colin Fairley – engineer
- Eamonn Singer (Elvis Costello) – cover painting
- Keith Morris – photography
- Michael Krage – design

== Charts ==
Chart performance for Blood & Chocolate
Chart (1986)	Peak Position
Dutch Albums (MegaCharts)	19
Swedish Albums (Sverigetopplistan)	12
UK Albums Chart	16
US Billboard Top Pop Albums	84

== Certifications ==
Sales certifications for Blood & Chocolate
Region	Certification	Certified units/sales
United Kingdom (BPI)	Gold	100,000^{^}
^{^} Shipments figures based on certification alone.
