= Goodbye Cruel World (Elvis Costello album) =

Studio album by Elvis Costello and the Attractions
- Released: 18 June 1984
- Recorded: March–April 1984
- Studio: Sarm West (London)
- Genre: Pop
- Length: 44:08
- Labels: F-Beat; Columbia
- Producers: Clive Langer; Alan Winstanley

Elvis Costello and the Attractions chronology
Punch the Clock (1983)	Goodbye Cruel World (1984)	The Best of Elvis Costello and the Attractions (1985)

Singles from Goodbye Cruel World
- 1. "I Wanna Be Loved" Released: June 1984; 2. "The Only Flame in Town" Released: August 1984

Goodbye Cruel World is the ninth studio album by the English singer-songwriter Elvis Costello, and his eighth with the Attractions—keyboardist Steve Nieve, bassist Bruce Thomas and drummer Pete Thomas (no relation). It was released on 18 June 1984 through F-Beat Records in the United Kingdom and Columbia Records in the United States. Produced by Clive Langer and Alan Winstanley, who returned from 1983's Punch the Clock, the album was recorded at London's Sarm West Studios in March 1984 during a period of turmoil for the artist. The problematic sessions included disagreements between Costello and the producers over the album's direction and high tensions amongst the Attractions.

The album features a commercial pop sound in line with music trends of the time. The mostly downbeat lyrics reflect Costello's personal upheavals at the time, including his failing marriage. Daryl Hall and Green Gartside contributed guest vocals to the singles "The Only Flame in Town" and "I Wanna Be Loved", respectively. The cover artwork features Costello and the band on a cliffside against a blue sky, while the title, taken from an obscure 1960s single, was intended as black humour.

Costello supported Goodbye Cruel World through music videos and tours, both solo and with the Attractions. Upon release, the album sold poorly, reaching number 10 in the UK and number 35 in the US. Critically, it received mixed reviews and retrospective reviews consider it one of Costello's weakest releases, most criticising its production as dated. Costello himself expressed disappointment with the record. Critics felt the album's 2004 reissue, featuring stripped-down demo versions, redeemed many of the tracks.

== Background ==
Elvis Costello released his eighth studio album Punch the Clock in August 1983. With a mainstream pop-soul sound fashioned by one of England's top production duos at the time, Clive Langer and Alan Winstanley, the record rebounded from the commercial disappointment of 1982's Imperial Bedroom, reaching number three in the United Kingdom and number 24 in the United States. To support the album, Costello and his backing band the Attractions—keyboardist Steve Nieve, bassist Bruce Thomas and drummer Pete Thomas (no relation)—toured for the rest of the year. The additions of the horns and backing singers, who played on Punch the Clock, to the shows added tensions between Costello and the band, who felt sidelined. Costello was also suffering personal crises at the time, having resumed his affair with the model Bebe Buell, leading to the breakdown of his marriage.

Believing the songs on Punch the Clock lacked refinement, which he partly attributed to the production, Costello spent December 1983 and January 1984 writing songs in an unused F-Beat Records office above a hair salon in Acton, London. Equipped with an electric piano, guitar and canvas to paint on when he ran out of ideas, he applied "more craft and focus", recording demos of "The Great Unknown", "Worthless Thing" and "Peace in Our Time" at London's Eden Studios. (Note: During the period, he painted a portrait that he explained was "a rather crude visual joke" titled after the film Pat and Mike (1953); the new album almost took its title.) According to the author Graeme Thomson, there was a "a reflective, narrative thread to the new songs". In mid-February 1984, Costello and the Attractions road-tested nine of the new record's 13 songs on a short six-date tour in France. Tensions between them continued and by the time recording for the new album started, the artist had privately decided it would be his last album with the Attractions.

== Recording ==
Recording for the album took place over two weeks in March 1984 at Trevor Horn's Sarm West Studios in London. Although Costello had initially thought of Richard Thompson to produce, Langer and Winstanley ultimately returned following Punch the Clock's commercial performance. From the start, the artist and producers disagreed on the album's direction. The former envisioned a "ragged, folk rock sound", while the latter wanted their signature style. Langer later stated:

He would have been better off going back to [his former producer] Nick Lowe. I wanted to carry on from where we had got to with 'Everyday I Write the Book', but Elvis was saying he wanted it really rough. I didn't think it was the greatest bunch of songs, anyway, and we did say, 'It would be great if you could write some more pop songs.' But he never did.

I almost completely thwarted the efforts of my producers... and it is true to say that they were probably ill-equipped for dealing with someone of my temperament at that time. A nurse with a large sedative syringe might have been more appropriate.

— Elvis Costello, 2004

After two weeks of struggling with live takes of the tracks, Costello stated that he and the producers "called a truce": Langer and Winstanley were allowed to give their commercial touch on "The Only Flame in Town" and a cover of an obscure Teacher's Edition B-side, "I Wanna Be Loved", while the remaining tracks went untouched. Costello recalled having a miserable time during recording, saying in 2004 that the record turned into "a battle to sustain some pace against my desire to make everything slow and mournful."

Several outside musicians guested on the album: Daryl Hall of Hall & Oates sang harmony vocals on "The Only Flame in Town", Green Gartside of Scritti Politti sang backing vocals on "I Wanna Be Loved", trombonist Big Jim Paterson returned from Punch the Clock and Gary Barnacle added saxophone to a few tracks. The extra players did little to liven the spirits of the Attractions, who remained resentful throughout. Bruce Thomas later remarked: "They were just there to inject an extra element that meant we weren't stuck with each other all the time. The same four guys who were probably not on a creative high at the time." The album was completed in early April 1984.

== Music and lyrics ==
In his book The Words and Music of Elvis Costello, the author James E. Perone states that the music on Goodbye Cruel World offers a "commercial, conventional pop sound" tied to the "prevailing trends of the time". In his review of the album for The New York Times, Stephen Holden wrote that it contains "a freewheeling dictionary of pop and rock references that run from Memphis soul to slinky pop-jazz, from Fats Domino to Burt Bacharach to the Beatles." He dubbed the sound "trebly, carnival pop". Costello himself said in the 1995 liner notes the record has a "lack of rock 'n' roll". The author Mick St. Michael found the music more melancholy than Punch the Clock.

The album's lyrics reflect Costello's personal upheavals at the time and are mostly downbeat. Tracks such as "Worthless Thing", "The Deportees Club", "Joe Porterhouse", "The Comedians" and "The Great Unknown" all hint at, in Costello's words, his "unhappiness" and "self-disgust"; disillusionment also runs throughout several, including "The Deportees Club" and "The Great Unknown". According to Rolling Stone's Don Shewey, side one mostly concerns relationships and side two is pervaded by political commentary. Costello said that the stories are "dense and obscure" but "can't disguise the fears, doubts and desires". Holden stated they portray a "corrupt world where lovers are the dupes of their illusions and the urges to love and power are inextricable".

=== Side one ===
The album's opener, "The Only Flame in Town", is an R&B-influenced song that Circus magazine's John Swenson compared to the "contemporary blue-eyed soul sound" of Hall & Oates, which he felt offered a good circumstance for Hall's guest appearance. With a prevalent saxophone sound, the narrator unsuccessfully attempts to convince himself he is unconcerned about his former lover's new boyfriend. In his book God's Comic, the biographer David Gouldstone found similar lyrical retreads dating back to 1977's "I'm Not Angry". "Home Truth" is a ballad that extends "themes of emotional realism" from Imperial Bedroom. With depressing lyrics dealing with marital breakdown, Perone finds it partly autobiographical, appearing to relate to Costello's own failing marriage.

"Room with No Number" is about a dishonest love affair-turned-violent taking place at a motel. Gouldstone writes its main theme as "guilty suppression and confusion". A revision of an Imperial Bedroom outtake, "Inch By Inch" was described by Kristine McKenna of the Los Angeles Times as "a tale of love decaying into bitterness". With "sinister" organ, "smoky" saxophone, and a bass riff that mirrors the Beatles' "I'm Only Sleeping" (1966), some reviewers on release compared it to 1977's "Watching the Detectives". Perone likens both "Room with No Number" and "Inch By Inch"'s 1980s pop sound to Culture Club.

"Worthless Thing" is an attack on the media, particularly the perils of fame, celebrities and celebrity adornment. Swenson felt the song harkened back to the artist's angry persona of his early works. Costello himself described it as "self-loathing". Musically, Perone calls it one of the album's few "true rock" songs. "Love Field" is an atmospheric ballad that views love, in Swenson's words, as "a kind of suspended animation". Perone says it resembles a dreamscape. Costello retrospectively felt it was one of the only songs not to have dated production.

=== Side two ===
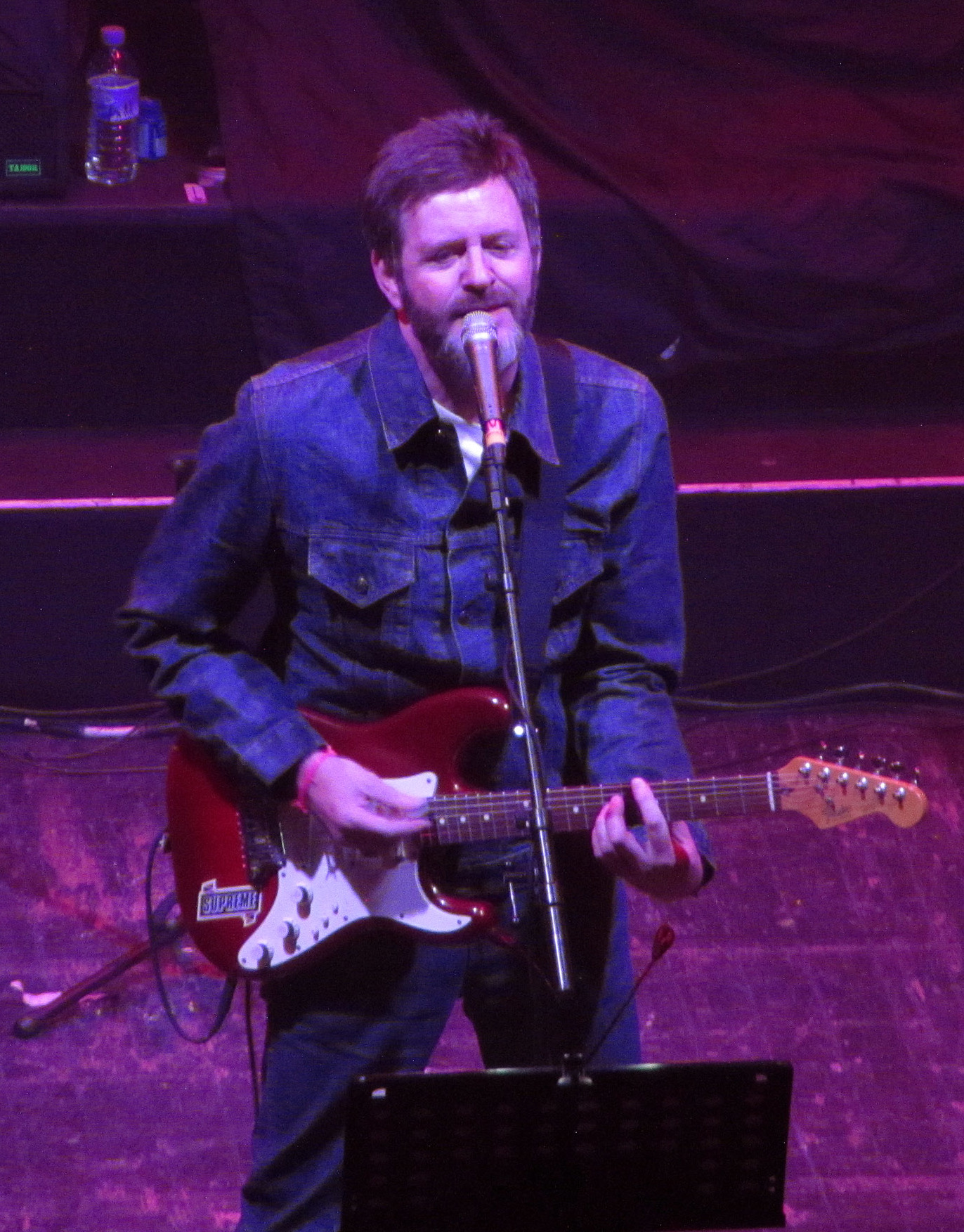
Green Gartside (pictured in 2014) of Scritti Politti sang guest vocals on "I Wanna Be Loved".

Costello's cover of "I Wanna Be Loved" uses synthesisers that Perone believes takes away from the "soulful spirit" of the original. Swenson likened the sound to calypso music. "The Comedians" takes its title from a Graham Greene novel of the same name, although the song itself has little to do with the book. With a 5/4-time signature, the song revisits older themes to create a tale about the "emptiness of modern society". According to Costello, "Joe Porterhouse" is about "the funeral of a family strong man". The music and some of the lyrics came from a song Costello had written for Respond Records artist Tracie called "I Love You When You Sleep". Perone compares the 1960s pop rock sound to Ray Davies of the Kinks.

"Sour Milk Cow Blues" is another of the album's few rock songs. Its cryptic lyrics tell of a narrator who weeps over his lover's abandonment of him. Gouldstone says the track continues the album's overall theme of "disjointed identity". "The Great Unknown" was intended for Robert Wyatt, who turned it down. It marked Costello's second songwriting collaboration with Langer following "Shipbuilding" the previous year. Discussing the song, Costello said in it, "infamous characters from celebrated songs have spiteful things done to them". Its unrelated verses all deal with forms of death, including gangsters, a Samson and Delilah story and the horrors of death in the World Wars. Perone opines its "arrangement and rhythmic feel" hint at British music hall, starkly contrasting with the lyrics.

Costello similarly regarded "The Deportees Club" as "the wrong music for the right words". Perone compares its music to 1978's "You Belong to Me", further likening it to a mainstream rock song out of the 1965 British music scene. Like 1981's "Clubland", the setting is in a nightclub, presenting a view of a fantasy world and life inside the club. The final track, "Peace in Our Time", is a waltz ballad that presents political commentary, in part a reaction against Thatcherism and Reaganomics. On release, Holden found references to "German disco, nuclear testing, the Falklands War, space exploration and Ronald Reagan". Perone states that it offers a feeling of "importance and topical commentary" lacking throughout the album, during a "politically interesting" time. Paterson's trombone solo was based on an unreleased Costello tune titled "World Without End".

== Packaging ==
The album's title came from a little-known 1960s single written by James Darlin. According to Costello, it was intended as black humour. Brian Griffin, who took the inner shots for Armed Forces (1979), shot photos for the Goodbye Cruel World album sleeve in Montpellier before the recording sessions began. The cover artwork is adorned by two trees on top of a cliffside, where Costello and the band—two in white and two in black—reside against a bright blue sky. Hinton says that Nieve looks like a fencer while Costello appears ready for a fist fight. Analysing the slightly oft-centred photograph, Hinton believes it has "an unsettling background of pure sky, as if the whole hillock is ascending to heaven. Perhaps all four are dead, and on their way to the afterworld." Gouldstone calls the sleeve "playfully enigmatic", encouraging listeners to explore the music inside.

On the back cover, the musicians melt into the background: Pete Thomas appears in a supernatural-like state; Bruce Thomas is seen from the back covered by a grid of red and blue lines; Costello lacks his glasses; Nieve is represented by a fencer's visor against a flowery backdrop. On the inner sleeve, Costello's self-portrait fragments into jigsaw pieces, half of which have flown away.

== Release and promotion ==
Shortly following the recording sessions, Costello booked a solo tour for the US and Europe in April 1984; it was the first time he performed solo since the sessions for My Aim Is True (1977). He later said: "I was having a miserable time. I basically ran away to sea." Supported by T Bone Burnett, Costello played stripped-down versions of Goodbye Cruel World tracks, his back catalogue and several covers he had yet to record. The tour was acclaimed for Costello's enthusiastic playing, above average vocal performances and as a lyrical showcase.

"Peace in Our Time" was released as a single under the pseudonym the Imposter through Costello's own IMP record label on 15 April 1984. It was his second release under the guise and label following "Pills and Soap" a year prior. Unlike the politically led release of that single, Costello said that for the release of "Peace in Our Time": "It's just a song I wanted out right now for reasons I think will be obvious when you hear it." Backed by a rendition of Richard and Linda Thompson's folk song "Withered and Died" (1973), the single reached number 48 in the UK. Melody Maker named it their single of the week, and Costello performed it on NBC's The Tonight Show Starring Johnny Carson in the US; the artist remembered being belittled by the studio audience.

Following his solo tour, Costello reunited with the Attractions for dates in New Zealand, Australia and Japan. By early June 1984, both his marriage and affair with Buell fell apart. The same month, "I Wanna Be Loved" was released as the first single, backed by "Turning the Town Red". It was supported by a music video shot in Australia during May. Featuring Costello alone, slumped in a photo booth whispering the song's lyrics as several men and women enter the shot to kiss him, Costello believed it was one of the only instances where a song of his was improved by the video. In the 2004 liner notes, he recalled being banned from the BBC's Top of the Pops during a performance of the single after Pete Thomas mimed to a drum fill on his head, revealing they were not actually playing live.

Released on 18 June 1984 through F-Beat in the UK and Columbia Records in the US, Goodbye Cruel World sold poorly, nevertheless reaching number 10 on the UK Albums Chart and number 35 on Billboard's Top 200 Albums chart in the US. Elsewhere, the album charted at number 20 in Sweden, 32 in New Zealand, 52 in Japan and 53 in Australia. Costello himself presented no enthusiasm upon its release, later saying in 1995: "I hated the record. I knew we'd got most of it wrong." He had initially considered shelving the album, but his poor finances at the time, in his own words, "would have invited bankruptcy" as he commenced divorce proceedings.

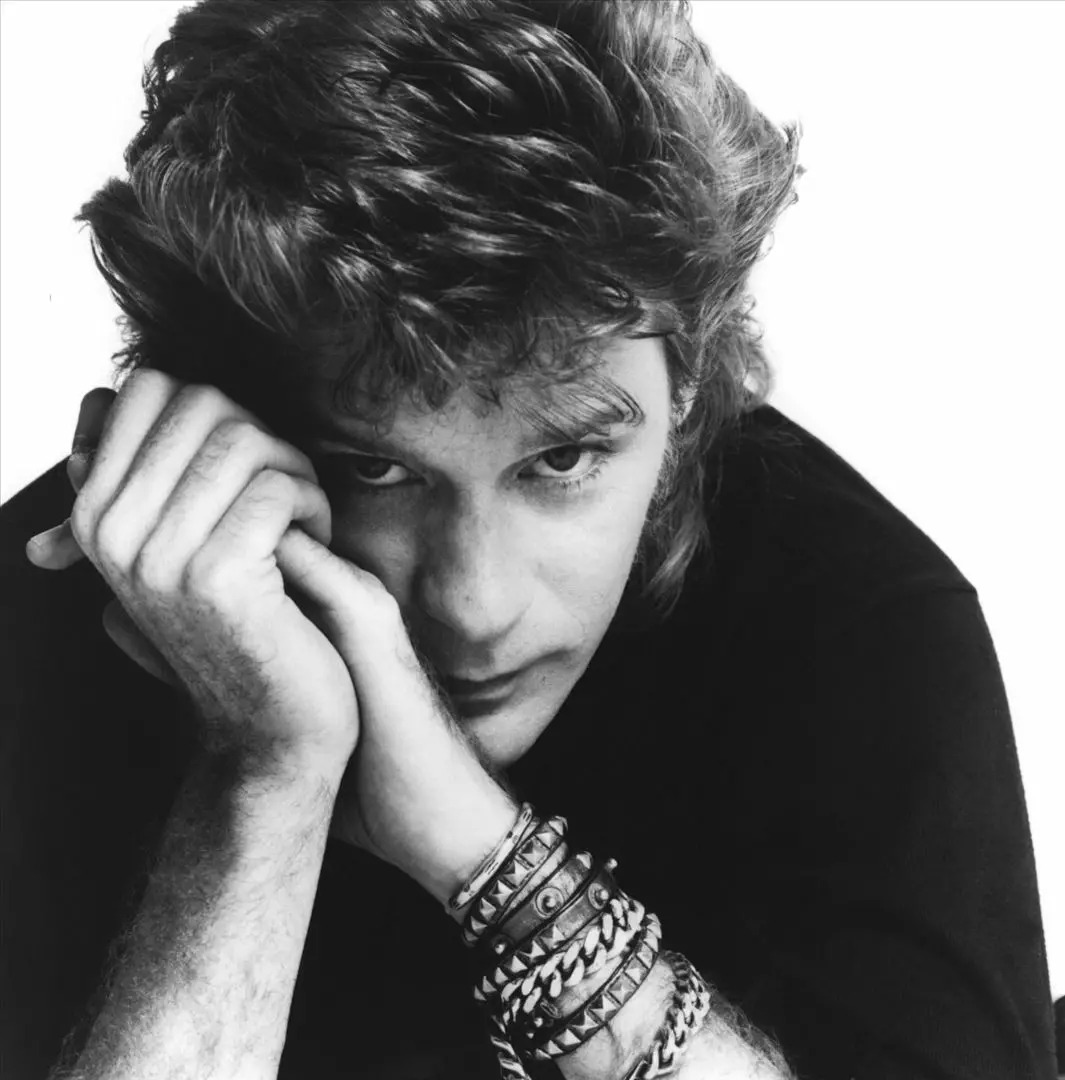
Daryl Hall (pictured in 1984), sang guest vocals on "The Only Flame in Town" and appeared in its music video.

"The Only Flame in Town", backed by "The Comedians", was released as the second single in August 1984. Reaching number 71 in the UK, it was Costello's lowest placement up to that point. Its music video was shot in New York and included both the Attractions and Daryl Hall. It also featured a small promotional contest wherein an individual could "win a date with the Attractions". According to Thomson, tensions between Costello and the band remained high during the shoot because "nobody was quite sure what was happening in terms of their long-term future".

With Barnacle on saxophone, Costello and the Attractions primarily toured the US and the UK from August to November 1984. Several Goodbye Cruel World tracks were played to promote the record and the shows attempted to recreate the album's production to waning effect. The supporting act for the US tour was Nick Lowe and His Cowboy Outfit, while British act the Pogues supported the UK shows. It was his last tour with the Attractions for several years.

== Critical reception ==
Professional ratings
Initial reviews
Review scores
Source	Rating
Record Mirror	5/5 stars
Rolling Stone	3/5 stars
Smash Hits	7/10
Sounds	4/5 stars
The Village Voice	B+

Goodbye Cruel World received mixed reviews on release. Several noticed a lack of musical innovation, lack of focus, hard to understand lyrics and felt the arrangements suffered from the production. (Note: Attributed to multiple references:) Mat Snow of NME called the album Costello's first disappointment in seven years, asking why the only cover song comes across as "more heartfelt" than any of the originals. He also highlighted the recycling of melodies and themes conveyed superiorly on prior works. Musician magazine's Fred Schruers referred to the album as a "brilliant slough of despond" and not one "made for hits". Some negatively compared the arrangements to Costello's recent solo tour; Creem's Mitchell Cohen particularly criticised them on the record as being "so errant from the thrust of the material". McKenna said that Costello "occasionally overreaches himself" some of his "most ambitious" arrangements to date in the Los Angeles Times. Shewey found the "right balance between craft and intuition" a rarity in Rolling Stone. Numerous highlighted "Peace in Our Time" as an album standout. (Note: Attributed to multiple references:)

The album did receive some positive reviews. In a five-star review for Record Mirror, Eleanor Levy described it as "a bitter-sweet album", one that is "laced perfectly with Costello's inevitable humour", and is the artist at "his most biting, musically and lyrically". Allan Jones was also positive in Melody Maker, finding it Costello's "most approachable" album since Trust, praising the performances of the Attractions over previous records, and concluding: "It isn't just a great album, it's a great Elvis Costello album." Hot Press's Declan Lynch highlighted the writing and playing as "accurate, scathing, melancholic and touching", ultimately calling the record further proof of the artist being "an immaculate songwriter, with a conscience". Comparing Goodbye Cruel World to Punch the Clock, Sounds magazine's Jay Williams described the former as more subdued but "retains all the hallmarks, all the catchlines, the bittersweet asides and the emotional intricacies which have come to characterise his work". In The New York Times, Holden dubbed it "an ambitious extension of the touching-all-bases eclecticism that Mr. Costello delineated in his previous two albums". Critic Robert Christgau of The Village Voice deemed Goodbye Cruel World "another solid if unspectacular effort" from the artist. In The Village Voice's annual Pazz & Jop critics poll for the year's best albums, Goodbye Cruel World placed at number 70, Costello's worst placement up to that point.

== Legacy ==
It is probably the worst record that I could have made of a decent bunch of songs.

— Elvis Costello, 2004

Although he hated the record on its initial release, Costello's view on Goodbye Cruel World has lightened in subsequent decades. Describing it as "the worst record of the best songs that I've written", he felt the lyrics were stronger than Punch the Clock, but believed its production led to the songs' lack of success; in the 2004 liner notes, he deemed Nieve's Yamaha DX7 synthesiser as having dated the record's sound more. He also regretted bringing back Langer and Winstanley as producers. The former even recalled, upon receiving a final copy: "I remember listening to it and saying, 'Oh fuck, it's no good.' It's a crap album." Although their future with the artist had been unclear, particularly following Costello's dismissal of them during the sessions for King of America (1986), Costello brought the Attractions back for Blood & Chocolate (1986). Bruce Thomas later said that Goodbye Cruel World "would have been a rotten album to end on."

=== Retrospective reviews ===
Professional ratings
Retrospective reviews
Review scores
Source	Rating
AllMusic	2/5 stars
Blender	2/5 stars
Chicago Tribune	2/4 stars
The Encyclopedia of Popular Music	3/5 stars
Entertainment Weekly	B
Mojo	2/5 stars
Q	4/5 stars
The Rolling Stone Album Guide	2/5 stars
Uncut	4/5 stars

Later reviewers consider Goodbye Cruel World one of Costello's weakest releases. (Note: Attributed to multiple references:) Commentators agree that its decent material was marred by heavily dated production. (Note: Attributed to multiple references:) Erlewine argued that tracks like "The Only Flame in Town" and "I Wanna Be Loved" benefit from the production, while most of the album's finest songs—"Room with No Number", "The Comedians", "Sour Milk-Cow Blues" and "Peace in Our Time"—all necessitate stripped-down arrangements. On the album as a whole, Erlewine felt the lackluster performances of all personnel involved equate to a lack of musical captivation. Conversely, Record Collector's Terry Staunton believed Costello's vocal performances offer power on "Home Truth" and "Inch By Inch". In 2021, writers for Stereogum felt there were overlooked moments of "brilliance" in tracks like "The Deportees Club" and "Peace in Our Time", but ultimately stated the record was "Costello as his most incongruent in terms of sound and vision". A year later, Spin's Al Shipley believed the record was "more pleasant than its reputation suggests", but nevertheless felt it lacks the personality to attract even Costello's most die-hard fans.

On the other hand, some find the record lacking in quality entirely. In a career retrospective, Trouser Press wrote: "Goodbye Cruel World seems awkward and forced. The playing's overly baroque, the melodies mild and too much of Costello's edge is sublimated by the Langer/Winstanley cushion of sound." Ultimate Classic Rock's Michael Gallucci, who criticised the production as "misguided", found the recordings themselves disassociated from the artist in the final product. Author Tony Clayton-Lea opines that "most of the songs were written on an enforced 9–5 basis, and it shows." Nevertheless, Tierney Smith of Goldmine magazine argued that Costello's "worst" is superior to other artists' best efforts. Commentators have also maligned the album's title. Jones referred to it as "barren", while Hinton says it as sounds "like a suicide note in vinyl". In his 2004 biography of the artist, Thomson states: "Some albums that meet with critical dismay upon their release are later hailed as lost, overlooked gems, but Goodbye Cruel World will never be one of them."

== Reissues ==
Goodbye Cruel World was first released on CD through Columbia and Demon in January 1988. Its first extended reissue through Demon in the UK and Rykodisc in the US on CD came on 7 March 1995, with bonus tracks that dated from the sessions. Costello's liner notes open with the statement, "Congratulations! You've just purchased our worst album."

Stripped of the glossy Clive Langer/Alan Winstanley production and given spare, direct arrangements, the songs sound stark and moody, altogether stronger than they did on the finished album.

— Stephen Thomas Erlewine on the 2004 reissue demos

Goodbye Cruel World was again reissued, this time by Rhino Records, on 3 August 2004 as a two-disc set with additional bonus tracks on top of the 1994 ones, (Note: Excluding the Rykodisc's version of "The Deportees Club", which was moved to the reissue of Costello's next album King of America (1986).) including Costello's original demos, B-sides, alternate takes and live recordings from his solo tours. The 2004 reissue received positive reviews. Commentators agreed that the additional tracks showcased the strength of the songs and how they suffered from the production. Smith argued the demos reveal "Costello's astonishing melodic gifts". Costello himself stated in the reissue's liner notes that "it is pretty clear that I cannibalised most of this material to complete the lyrics that appear on the main record." Erlewine argued it made for a "revelatory listening" experience and superior to the original Goodbye Cruel World album. It was later remastered and reissued on LP by UM^{e} on 6 November 2015.

During a 2016 interview with Canadian author Malcolm Gladwell, Langer heard the reissued version of "The Deportees Club", renamed "Deportee", for the first time. He responded: "It sounds like he's found the song... maybe we were not focused enough [when we made the album]. Maybe we were making a record, but we were miles away." About Goodbye Cruel World, Gladwell comments: "At the time, [Costello, Langer, and Winstanley] thought they had put out something mediocre, but what they didn't understand until much later was that the mediocrity contained a bit of genius – it's just that it hadn't become genius yet."

== Track listing ==
All songs written by Elvis Costello, except where noted.

Side one

1. "The Only Flame in Town" – 4:01
2. "Home Truth" – 3:12
3. "Room with No Number" – 4:13
4. "Inch by Inch" – 2:29
5. "Worthless Thing" – 3:04
6. "Love Field" – 3:26

Side two

1. "I Wanna Be Loved" (Farnell Jenkins) – 4:47
2. "The Comedians" – 2:36
3. "Joe Porterhouse" – 3:29
4. "Sour Milk Cow Blues" – 2:50
5. "The Great Unknown" (Costello, Clive Langer) – 3:00
6. "The Deportees Club" – 2:54
7. "Peace in Our Time" – 4:06

== Personnel ==
According to the album's 1995 liner notes:

- Elvis Costello – vocals, guitars, anvil
- Steve Nieve – keyboards (Note: Credited with providing "random racket" under the name "Maurice Worm".)
- Bruce Thomas – bass guitar
- Pete Thomas – drums

with:

- Gary Barnacle – saxophone
- Jim Paterson – trombone
- Luís Jardim – percussion
- Daryl Hall – duet harmony vocals on "The Only Flame in Town"
- Green Gartside – harmony vocals on "I Wanna Be Loved"

Technical

- Clive Langer – producer
- Alan Winstanley – producer
- Bob Kraushaar – assistant producer
- Brian Griffin – photography
- Phil Smee – typography

== Charts ==
Weekly chart performance for Goodbye Cruel World
Chart (1984)	Peak Position
Australian Albums (Kent Music Report)	53
Japanese Albums (Oricon)	52
New Zealand Albums (RIANZ)	32
Swedish Albums (Sverigetopplistan)	20
UK Albums Chart	10
US Billboard Top 200 Albums	35

== Certifications ==
Sales certifications for Goodbye Cruel World
Region	Certification	Certified units/sales
United Kingdom (BPI)	Silver	60,000^{^}
^{^} Shipments figures based on certification alone.
