= Bruce Thomas (musician) =

English musician

- Born: 14 August 1948 (age 78); Stockton-on-Tees, England
- Genre: Rock
- Instrument: Bass guitar
- Years active: 1977–present

Bruce Thomas (born 14 August 1948) is an English bass guitarist, best known as bassist for The Attractions; the band formed in 1977 to back Elvis Costello in concert and on record.

In addition to his work with The Attractions, Thomas has recorded with Billy Bragg, John Wesley Harding, Suzanne Vega, and Tasmin Archer.

Thomas has also been a nonfiction writer for several decades, and is the author of Bruce Lee: Fighting Spirit (1994), a biography of the martial artist and movie star Bruce Lee, and The Body of Time (and the Energies of Being) (1991), a short book about metaphysics. Rough Notes, published in 2015, is both a memoir of his time with The Attractions and a documentary history of the British music scene of the 1970s. A Tall Story ...That Won't Go Away, published in 2025, is his from-the-inside look at the Paul Is Dead conspiracy theory.

== Early life ==
Thomas attended Grangefield Grammar School in Stockton on Tees, and after leaving, worked as a trainee commercial-artist at the local Evening Gazette newspaper. Thomas was originally a harmonica player in local bands. He was in a band called The Tremors and switched to bass guitar when their bass player failed to appear one night. Thomas eventually joined The Roadrunners (with Paul Rodgers and Micky Moody). After Rodgers switched from playing bass to being their up-front singer, the band changed their name to The Wildflowers, and in late 1966 decided to quit their respective day-jobs and move to London. After achieving little success, the band eventually split.

== Bands ==
Thomas remained in London, playing with the bands Bitter Sweet and Bodast in the late 1960s and recording with Quiver, The Sutherland Brothers, Moonrider and Al Stewart in the early 1970s.

His work with Costello brought Thomas his greatest fame. Between 1977 and 1987, Elvis Costello & The Attractions released nine record albums, including This Year's Model (1978), Armed Forces (1979), Imperial Bedroom (1982), Punch the Clock (1983), and Blood & Chocolate (1986), and toured extensively.

During his tenure with The Attractions, Thomas used a wide variety of bass guitars. He at various times owned a selection of Fender Precisions, a Danelectro Longhorn and a Wal bass.

After Costello's initial split with The Attractions in 1987, Thomas recorded with such other artists as Billy Bragg, John Wesley Harding, and Suzanne Vega. In 1990, he released his first book The Big Wheel, a memoir in which the key characters are recognizable without ever being identified by name. Costello, for instance, is called "the singer". Apparently annoyed by his depiction in the book, Costello responded with the songs "How to Be Dumb" and, by Thomas' own reckoning, "Hurry Down Doomsday (The Bugs Are Taking Over)" on his album Mighty Like a Rose (1991). Costello has described his relationship with Thomas during this period as "pretty non-existent".

Despite this estrangement, Costello was persuaded by co-producer Mitchell Froom to invite Thomas to play on the album Brutal Youth (1994). Thomas was featured on five tracks of the album. The reunited Elvis Costello & The Attractions followed the album with a tour and another album All This Useless Beauty (1996). Toward the end of a second tour, Costello announced that he would be splitting with the group as soon as the tour was over. Elvis Costello & The Attractions played their final concert on 15 September 1996, in Nagoya, Japan.

Costello has said in interviews with a variety of publications, including the Rocky Mountain News, that the old animosity between himself and Thomas returned. Costello said that Thomas deliberately sabotaged some songs onstage, which was the breaking point. The other two Attractions, Steve Nieve and Pete Thomas (no relation to Bruce), have continued to tour and record with Costello as The Imposters, with Davey Faragher, formerly of Cracker, on bass. Bruce Thomas has said that he simply lost interest in playing with Costello. In an interview Thomas stated "no reformation is ever going to come about under my initiative – or under any other circumstances I can foresee."

== Honours ==
In 2003, Thomas was inducted into the Rock and Roll Hall of Fame as a member of Elvis Costello and The Attractions. Thomas appeared onstage with Costello to accept the honor, but they did not perform together. Thomas' book On the Road ...Again, the sequel to The Big Wheel, was published that same year.

== Bibliography ==
- The Big Wheel (1990)
- The Body of Time (and the Energies of Being) (1991)
- Bruce Lee: Fighting Spirit (1994)
- Bruce Lee: Fighting Talk (2003; Revised as Bruce Lee: Fighting Words, 2005)
- On the Road ...Again (2003)
- Immortal Combat: Portrait of a True Warrior (2006)
- The Men Who Killed Manchester United ...One Fan's View (2017, Revised 2019)
- Tyson Fury: Fighting Shadows, The Unauthorized Biography (2019)
- Strange Affairs: Rockstars, Royalty, and Villains... (2024)
- Tyson Fury: Wasted (2024)
- Manchester United: One More Last Chance (2025)
- Lee vs Ali: The Fight of the Century (2025)
- Vibe Shift: From Consensus ...to Conscious (2026)
- Pickle: A Small Life (2026)
- Bruce Lee: Real Fights! (2026)

=== Book Series ===
- Memoirs (The Road Series), 2015 – 2022
  - Rough Notes (2015)
  - The Open Road (2022)
- Bruce Lee: The Teaching Series, 2016 – 2023
  - Bruce Lee: Beyond the Limits (2016)
  - Bruce Lee: Change Your World (2018)
  - The Tao of Bruce Lee (2018)
  - Bruce Lee: Complete Teachings (2020)
  - Bruce Lee 50th Anniversary Special: A Life Worth Remembering (2023)
- The Conspiracy Series, 2023 – 2026
  - The Arrow: The Adventure of Our Times (2023)
  - A Tall Story ...That Won't Go Away (2025)
  - When Conspiracy Theories Come True: When the Unbelievable ...Becomes Undeniable (2026)
- Bruce Lee: The Legacy Series, 2024 – 2025
  - Bruce Lee: "Nothing Was Left Undone" (2024)
  - Bruce Lee: The Pathless Land (2025)
  - Bruce Lee: "Be Water, My Friend" (2025)
  - Bruce Lee: Complete Legacy (2026)
