= Steve Nieve =

English musician and composer (born 1958)

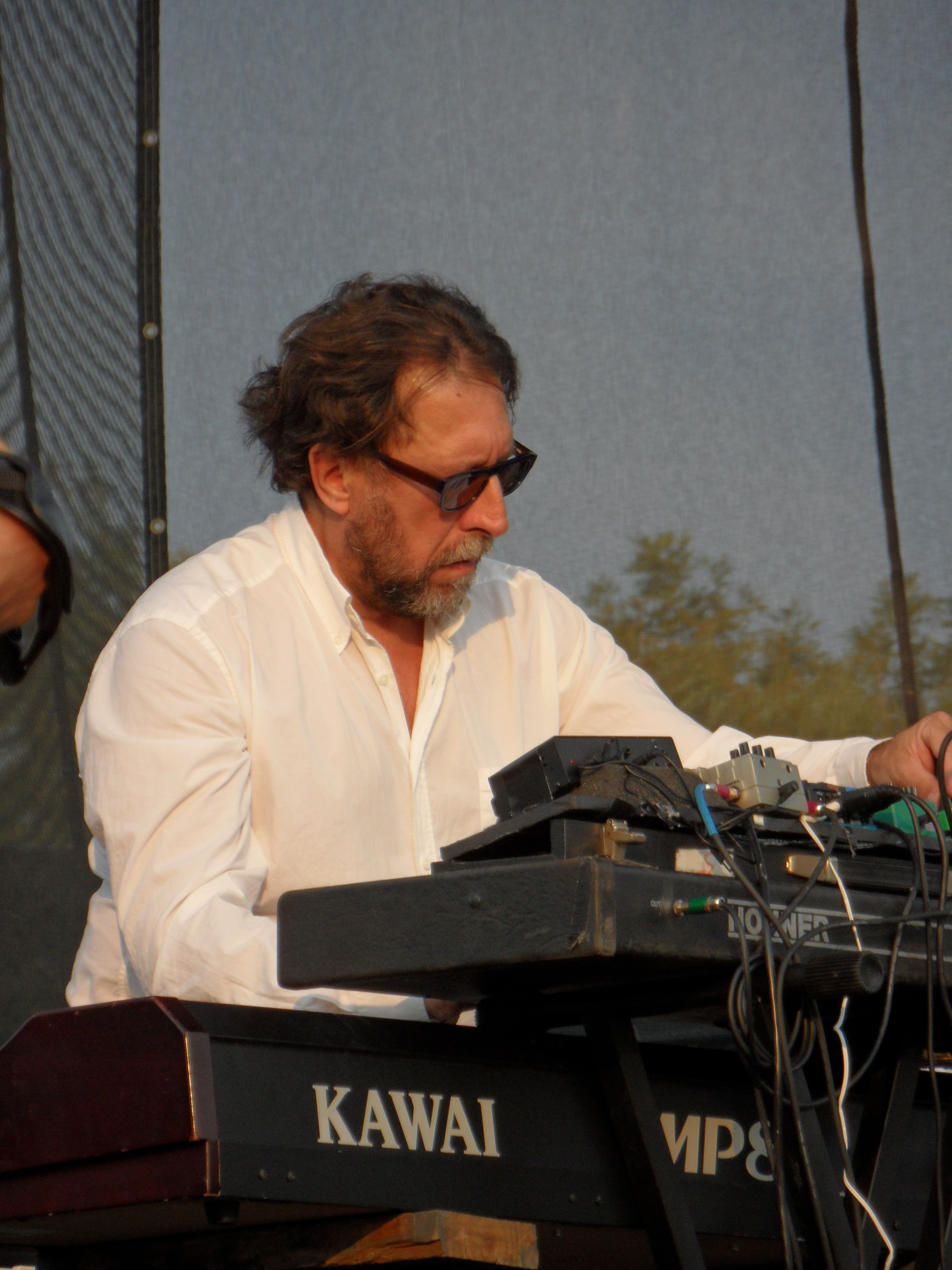
- Nieve performing in 2012

Background information
- Also known as: Steve A'dore, Maurice Worm, Norman Brain
- Born: Stephen John Nason; 21 February 1958 (age 68)
- Origin: London, England
- Genres: Punk rock; new wave; ska; post-punk
- Occupations: Musician; composer
- Instruments: Keyboards; synthesizer; theremin; guitar
- Years active: 1977–present
- Labels: 429; Stiff; Radar; F-Beat; Demon; Columbia; Warner Bros.; Mercury; Island; Deutsche Grammophon; Lost Highway; Verve; HearMusic; Rykodisc; Rhino; Hip-O
- Website: stevenieve.com

Steve Nieve (/naɪˈiːv/ "naïve"; born Stephen John Nason, 21 February 1958) is an English musician and composer. In a career spanning more than 40 years, Nieve has been a member of Elvis Costello's backing bands the Attractions and the Imposters, as well as Madness. He has also experienced success as a prolific session musician, featured on a wide array of other artists' recordings.

In 2003, he was inducted into the Rock and Roll Hall of Fame as a member of Elvis Costello and the Attractions.

== Early years ==
Nieve was born in Bishop's Stortford, England, and was educated at St Dunstan's College in London and later attended the Royal College of Music, but dropped out in 1977 to join Elvis Costello's backing band the Attractions. Nason received his musical moniker "Nieve" (pronounced "naïve") while on the Attractions' first tour for Stiff Records. It was bestowed by tourmate Ian Dury who had been astonished by Nason's innocent query, "What's a groupie?" Before that, at least briefly, he had been using the stage name "Steve A'dore" (a pun on stevedore).

== Career ==
Nieve played piano, organ and other keyboard instruments on most of Costello's projects for over ten years, including the albums This Year's Model (1978), Imperial Bedroom (1982) and Blood & Chocolate (1986). On the 1984 Costello album Goodbye Cruel World and its accompanying tour, he was credited as "Maurice Worm". His instrument credit on the album was not for playing keyboards, but for providing "random racket". Under the name Norman Brain he wrote some material on The Attractions' Costello-less album Mad About the Wrong Boy in collaboration with his then girlfriend, Fay Hart. (He also wrote other songs on the album as Steve Nieve.)

In the mid-1980s, Costello began to work less frequently with the Attractions and stopped working with them entirely between 1987 and 1993. During this period Nieve focused on session work for other artists (the Neville Brothers, Hothouse Flowers, Graham Parker, Squeeze, Tim Finn, Kirsty MacColl, Madness, Nick Heyward and David Bowie). Also in 1986, Nieve formed the group the Perils of Plastic with ex-Deaf School vocalist Steve Allen, releasing three non-charting singles in the UK in 1986 and 1987. At around the same time he led the house band (billed as Steve Nieve and The Playboys) on the UK TV series The Last Resort with Jonathan Ross.

Costello reunited the Attractions for 1994's album Brutal Youth. Although the reunion was relatively short-lived (they split again in 1996), the Costello/Nieve collaborations never ceased. They have toured as a duo, and Nieve has contributed keyboards to all of Costello's albums since the mid-1990s, including 1998's Burt Bacharach collaboration Painted From Memory and 2001's Anne Sofie von Otter collaboration For the Stars.

In 2001, Costello formed a new backing band consisting of Nieve, Attractions drummer Pete Thomas, and bassist Davey Faragher. The band were subsequently dubbed the Imposters. Elvis Costello & the Imposters have toured extensively and released the albums When I Was Cruel (2002), North (2003), The Delivery Man (2004), The River in Reverse (2006, featuring Allen Toussaint), Momofuku (2008), National Ransom (2010), Look Now (2018) and The Boy Named If (2022). In 2020, Nieve won a Grammy Award for his work with Costello and the Imposters on Look Now. Nieve (without the other Imposters) accompanied Costello again on Hey Clockface (2020).

== Solo career ==
In addition to his work with Costello, Nieve has released several solo albums. Keyboard Jungle (1983) was his first solo album, consisting entirely of original compositions with a strong cinematic influence, performed on a Steinway piano. His second album, Playboy (1987), consisted of solo acoustic piano renditions of rock songs by David Bowie, 10cc, the Specials, X and others, as well as original compositions. Though both albums were released only in the UK by the independent label Demon Music Group, they were critically well received and noted for their "display [of] the artist's wit, compositional talent and abundant instrumental agility."

Nieve followed these with the albums It's Raining Somewhere (1996), Mumu (2001) and Windows (2004). His classical opera, Welcome to the Voice, a collaboration with Muriel Téodori, was released on Deutsche Grammophon in May 2007. The score was interpreted by Barbara Bonney, Sting, Robert Wyatt, Elvis Costello, Amanda Roocroft, Nathalie Manfrino and Sara Fulgoni for the voices. For the music the Brodsky Quartet interpreted a written score, while Marc Ribot, Ned Rothenberg and Nieve improvised. Nieve also composed the score to Téodori's film Sans Plomb.

Welcome to the Voice was premiered at the Théâtre du Châtelet in Paris in 2008, with Sylvia Schwartz in the role of Lily, and the involvement of both Sting and Costello. In 2014, Nieve released ToGetHer.

== Personal life ==
In recent years, Nieve has lived in France with his wife Muriel Téodori.
