= The Attractions =

UK musical group

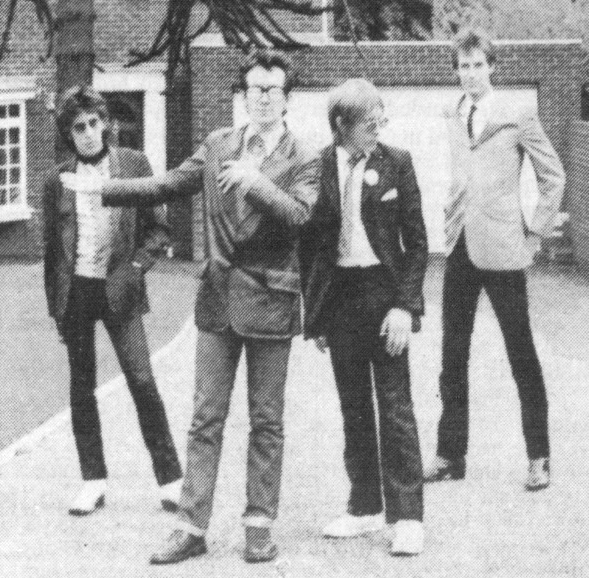
- From left to right: Steve Nieve, Elvis Costello, Bruce Thomas, Pete Thomas

Background information
- Origin: UK
- Genre: New wave
- Years active: 1977–1986; 1994–1996
- Labels: Radar; F-Beat
- Spinoffs: The Imposters
- Past members: Elvis Costello; Pete Thomas; Bruce Thomas; Steve Nieve

The Attractions were an English backing band for the English new wave musician Elvis Costello between 1977 and 1986, and again from 1994 to 1996. They consisted of Steve Nieve (keyboards), Bruce Thomas (bass guitar), and Pete Thomas (drums). They also released one album (and two associated singles) as an independent entity, without Costello, in 1980.

The band were inducted into the Rock and Roll Hall of Fame in 2003. They have been called one of the best backing bands in rock history.

== History ==
Backing for Costello's 1977 debut album was provided by the American West Coast band Clover. On the eve of that album's release, Costello formed his own permanent backing band, the Attractions, consisting of Steve Nieve (born Steve Nason; keyboards) from London, Bruce Thomas (bass guitar) from Stockton-on-Tees, and Pete Thomas (drums) from Sheffield. The two Thomases are unrelated.

Bruce Thomas was the oldest group member (29 when he joined), with the most professional experience prior to being an Attraction. He had previously been a member of the band Quiver, who had released two albums on their own in 1971/72, as well as functioning as the backing band for several albums by the Sutherland Brothers. These albums were credited to "The Sutherland Brothers and Quiver"; Thomas played on the early recordings credited to this group, including the minor American hit "(I Don't Want to Love You But) You Got Me Anyway", which peaked at No. 48 in 1973. He left the group before their biggest success, 1976's "Arms of Mary", a No. 5 UK hit and a No. 1 hit in many European countries. Thomas was also a member of Moonrider for their lone album in 1975, and recorded as a session musician for Al Stewart in the early to mid-1970s.

Pete Thomas, who was born the same month as Costello, had recorded one album as a member of Chilli Willi and the Red Hot Peppers.

Only Nason, who had classical training, had never recorded or played with a rock band before. Just 19 when he joined the group, Nason was given the stage name "Steve Nieve" (pronounced as "naive") by Ian Dury; while Elvis Costello & The Attractions were playing a series of concerts with Dury before they recorded their first single, Nason innocently asked Dury "What's a groupie?" Dury immediately dubbed Nason "Steve Naive", and the name stuck (although the spelling was altered.)

According to Pitchfork's Tyler Wilcox, the band replaced the "middle-of-the-road elements" of Clover to create a "minimal, hard-edged sound befitting the burgeoning punk scene in England at the time".

Costello and the Attractions made their live debut on 14 July 1977, shortly before the release of My Aim Is True (1977). A few live tracks were appended to the B-side of Costello's single "Watching the Detectives", issued in October 1977, which Nieve performed on. In December 1977, the Attractions appeared with Costello on Saturday Night Live as a last-minute replacement for the Sex Pistols. They played "Watching the Detectives" and began "Less Than Zero" before Costello abruptly cut the band off and counted them into the then-unreleased "Radio Radio". The impromptu stunt angered producer Lorne Michaels and resulted in Costello's banning from Saturday Night Live until 1989.

The Attractions' first album with Costello was This Year's Model (1978), but the band did not officially receive co-billing credit until 1979's Armed Forces. Costello later stated that he and the Attractions reached a level of musical agreement during the recording of Armed Forces that would never be matched again. From there, the Attractions backed Costello on all of his albums and singles until 1984, with the exception of "New Amsterdam" (1980), a solo single recorded by Costello. On 1984's Goodbye Cruel World and its associated tour, Nieve was billed as "Maurice Worm".

In 1980, the Attractions recorded an album of their own, entitled Mad About the Wrong Boy. The album features original compositions by all three group members, and was produced by Roger Bechirian. Steve Nieve wrote the music for several songs under the pseudonym "Norman Brain"; for these songs, his then-girlfriend Fay Hart provided lyrics, leading to a writing credit of "Brain/Hart". The Brain/Hart composition "Single Girl" was released as the first single from the album, followed by the Nieve-composed "Arms Race" as the second single. Neither single charted.

Due to their frequent use of pseudonyms and their associations with Bechirian, the Attractions were widely – but erroneously – rumoured to have been behind Blanket of Secrecy (BoS), a synthpop trio recognised at the time only by the pseudonyms 'Tinker', 'Tailor' and 'Soldier'. The group's lone album, Walls Have Ears, was produced by Bechirian and issued in 1982.

Guitarist Martin Belmont was briefly added to Attractions live line-up in 1981, but never recorded as an official member of the band. He did, however, make a guest appearance on the 1981 Costello single "From A Whisper to a Scream", which was also included on the album, Trust.

In early 1986, Costello released King of America, billed to the Costello Show and made largely without the Attractions, who played on only one track, as well as the non-LP B-side "Baby's Got A Brand New Hairdo", billed to 'The Costello Show Featuring The Attractions'.

Later that same year Costello reunited with The Attractions to record the album Blood & Chocolate, the final Attractions release for several years. The original group reunited for several tracks on Costello's 1994 album Brutal Youth and toured together over the next two years. They recorded one further album as a group (1996's All This Useless Beauty) but split for good in 1996.

Nieve and Pete Thomas continued to back Costello through various touring and recording line-ups, and are still members of his current backing group the Imposters. The split between Costello and Bruce Thomas, however, appears permanent. Bruce Thomas made a brief appearance with his former bandmates when the group was inducted into the Rock & Roll Hall of Fame in 2003. When asked by Rolling Stone why Thomas did not play with them at the event, Costello replied, "I only work with professional musicians." He then went on to add "I have absolute respect for his playing on the records when he cared. He was certainly one of the best bass players around."

== Discography ==
For Elvis Costello solo material, please see the Elvis Costello discography.

=== The Attractions / Costello albums ===
- This Year's Model (1978)
- Armed Forces (1979)
- Get Happy!! (1980)
- Trust (1981)
- Almost Blue (1981)
- Imperial Bedroom (1982)
- Punch the Clock (1983)
- Goodbye Cruel World (1984)
- King of America (1986)
  - "Suit of Lights" only
- Blood & Chocolate (1986)
- Brutal Youth (1994)
  - Bruce Thomas only appears on five songs, with Nick Lowe (seven songs) or Elvis (two songs) on bass for the other tracks
- All This Useless Beauty (1996)
- Spanish Model (UMe, 2021) (Note: Re-recording of This Year's Model with new vocalists singing to the Attractions' original backing tracks.)

=== The Attractions non-Costello albums ===
- Mad About the Wrong Boy (F-Beat Records, 1980)

=== The Attractions non-Costello singles ===
- "Single Girl" b/w "Slow Patience" (F-Beat Records, 1980)
- "Arms Race" b/w "Lonesome Little Town" (F-Beat Records, 1980)
