= Live at Hollywood High =

- Live at Hollywood High 3-track EP from 1979

Live album by Elvis Costello
- Released: 12 January 2010
- Recorded: 4 June 1978
- Genre: Punk rock, new wave
- Length: 73:05
- Label: Hip-O Select
- Producer: Nick Lowe

Elvis Costello chronology
Secret, Profane & Sugarcane (2009)	Live at Hollywood High (2010)	National Ransom (2010)

Live at Hollywood High (officially released as Live at Hollywood High/The Costello Show Vol. 2) is a recording by Elvis Costello and the Attractions from a 1978 concert at Hollywood High School in Los Angeles, California. Three songs from the concert were originally included as a bonus 7" vinyl EP that sold with initial pressings of the Armed Forces album in 1979. A 2002 re-issue of Armed Forces added six tracks to the three from the EP (for a total of nine tracks) and placed them in proper running order. In 2010, the Hip-O Select label released a full version of Live at Hollywood High with all 20 tracks from the concert on one CD.

This release followed three earlier concert releases from Elvis Costello, including:

- Nashville Rooms (London, England), recorded on 7 August 1977, which was included as a bonus CD on the 2007 deluxe edition of My Aim Is True (1977).
- Warner Theatre (Washington, DC), recorded on 28 February 1978, which was included on the deluxe edition of This Year's Model (1978).
- El Mocambo (Toronto, Ontario), recorded on 6 March 1978, which was released by CBS as a promotional LP in Canada and re-released in 1993 as one of four CDs on the 2½ Years box set. It was later given a stand-alone release as The Costello Show: Live at the El Mocambo in 2009. The original vinyl LP and CD re-releases of this concert all contain the same songs.

== Track listing ==
All tracks are written by Elvis Costello.

No.	Title	Length
1.	"Accidents Will Happen"	3:29
2.	"Mystery Dance"	2:02
3.	"Lip Service"	2:44
4.	"Living in Paradise"	3:31
5.	"Goon Squad"	3:49
6.	"(The Angels Wanna Wear My) Red Shoes"	2:33
7.	"Party Girl"	2:57
8.	"(I Don't Want to Go to) Chelsea"	4:40
9.	"This Year's Girl"	3:46
10.	"No Action"	2:08
11.	"Stranger in the House"	4:02
12.	"The Beat"	3:37
13.	"Alison"	3:05
14.	"Lipstick Vogue"	4:18
15.	"Watching the Detectives"	5:59
16.	"You Belong to Me"	2:39
17.	"Radio Radio"	2:29
18.	"Pump It Up"	4:02
19.	"Waiting for the End of the World"	4:32
20.	"Miracle Man"	5:05

Tracks 1, 13, and 15 composed the original 3-track vinyl EP included in early copies of Armed Forces. Tracks 1, 2, 5, 7, 11, 13, 14, 15, and 16 were included on the bonus disc of Armed Forces from 2002.

== Personnel ==
- Elvis Costello – guitar, vocals

The Attractions

- Steve Nieve – keyboards, backing vocals
- Bruce Thomas – bass, backing vocals
- Pete Thomas – drums

== Reception ==
American pop music critic Robert Hilburn wrote in the Los Angeles Times about the original concert in 1978. He said "the concert was a richly satisfying, well paced performance that had the capacity audience on its feet for most of the hour set ... in the evening's big surprise, Costello turned from his usual rock style for an excellent country song that could well be a number one hit for George Jones, who is Costello's favorite male singer ... titled "Stranger In The House", it could also be a big pop hit for Linda Ronstadt, who was in the Hollywood High audience".

For the 2010 release, Andy Whitman from Paste Magazine said the CD was "classic, but unessential". He noted the expansion of the tunes saying it is "filled out with a batch of previously unreleased tracks. The resulting album careens from great song to great song, most derived from Costello’s first two classics My Aim Is True and This Year’s Model". AllMusic rated it, stating the album wasn't "as legendary as Live at the El Mocambo, which had the benefit of once being one of Elvis Costello’s rarest records, but it’s a better show, or at least a better indication of the Attractions at their absolute peak ... every performance here is significantly revved up from the album versions".
