= 2½ Years =

2 1/2 Years

Box set by Elvis Costello
- Released: 12 October 1993
- Recorded: 1977–1979
- Genres: Punk rock, pub rock, new wave
- Length: 173:13
- Label: Demon/Rykodisc
- Producers: Elvis Costello, Nick Lowe

Elvis Costello chronology
The Juliet Letters (1993)	2 1/2 Years (1993)	Live at the El Mocambo (1993)

Professional ratings
Review scores
Source	Rating
Allmusic	4.5/5 stars
NME	8/10

2 1/2 Years is a box set by English musician Elvis Costello, released in 1993. It contained the expanded edition of Costello's first three albums (My Aim Is True, This Year's Model, and Armed Forces) plus an official release of the often bootlegged Live at the El Mocambo album.

The Costello reissues (1993–1995) of Rykodisc (US) and Demon Records (UK and Europe) would ultimately include his eleven studio albums (each with bonus tracks) released from 1977 to 1991 on Columbia (in the US) and Stiff Records, Radar Records, F-Beat Records and Demon Records (for the rest of the world) plus a reissue of the G.B.H. soundtrack, the Live at the El Mocambo album and greatest hits collection The Very Best of Elvis Costello and The Attractions 1977–86.

In 2001, Rhino Records would launch another Costello reissue program, taking a different approach than Rykodisc and Demon (see Elvis Costello main page). In 2007, Costello's 1977–86 catalogue was re-released by Hip-O Records, the reissue division of Costello's then current label, Universal Music.

== Track listing ==
All tracks are written by Elvis Costello, unless otherwise indicated.

Disc one, My Aim is True
No.	Title	Length
1.	"Welcome to the Working Week"	1:22
2.	"Miracle Man"	3:28
3.	"No Dancing"	2:37
4.	"Blame It on Cain"	2:48
5.	"Alison"	3:21
6.	"Sneaky Feelings"	2:08
7.	"(The Angels Wanna Wear My) Red Shoes"	2:32
8.	"Less than Zero"	3:11
9.	"Mystery Dance"	1:35
10.	"Pay It Back"	2:32
11.	"I'm Not Angry"	2:57
12.	"Waiting for the End of the World"	3:22
13.	"Watching the Detectives"	3:45
14.	"Radio Sweetheart"	2:25
15.	"Stranger in the House"	3:01
16.	"Imagination (Is A Powerful Deceiver)"	3:38
17.	"Mystery Dance"	2:13
18.	"Cheap Reward"	2:15
19.	"Jump Up"	2:06
20.	"Wave a White Flag"	1:53
21.	"Blame it on Cain"	3:30
22.	"Poison Moon"	1:53

Disc two, This Year's Model
No.	Title	Length
1.	"No Action"	1:58
2.	"This Year's Girl"	3:17
3.	"The Beat"	3:45
4.	"Pump It Up"	3:14
5.	"Little Triggers"	2:40
6.	"You Belong to Me"	2:22
7.	"Hand in Hand"	2:33
8.	"(I Don't Want to Go to) Chelsea"	3:07
9.	"Lip Service"	2:36
10.	"Living in Paradise"	3:52
11.	"Lipstick Vogue"	3:29
12.	"Night Rally"	2:41
13.	"Radio Radio"	3:05
14.	"Big Tears" (Guitar – Mick Jones)	3:09
15.	"Crawling to the USA"	2:53
16.	"Running Out of Angels" (Demo)	2:02
17.	"Greenshirt" (Early version of "Green Shirt")	2:20
18.	"Big Boys" (Demo)	3:00
Total length:		52:03

Disc three, Armed Forces
No.	Title	Writer(s)	Length
1.	"Accidents Will Happen"		3:00
2.	"Senior Service"		2:17
3.	"Oliver's Army"		2:58
4.	"Big Boys"		2:54
5.	"Green Shirt"		2:42
6.	"Party Girl"		3:20
7.	"Goon Squad"		3:14
8.	"Busy Bodies"		3:33
9.	"Sunday's Best"		3:22
10.	"Moods for Moderns"		2:48
11.	"Chemistry Class"		2:55
12.	"Two Little Hitlers"		3:18
13.	"(What's So Funny 'Bout) Peace, Love and Understanding?"	Nick Lowe	3:34
14.	"My Funny Valentine" (B-side to "Oliver's Army")	Rodgers and Hart	1:28
15.	"Tiny Steps"		2:42
16.	"Clean Money"		1:57
17.	"Talking in the Dark"		1:56
18.	"Wednesday Week"		2:01
19.	"Accidents Will Happen" (Live)		3:23
20.	"Alison" (Live)		3:06
21.	"Watching the Detectives" (Live)		6:08
Total length:			66:20

Disc four, Live at the El Mocambo
No.	Title	Length
1.	"Mystery Dance"	2:19
2.	"Waiting for the End of the World"	3:52
3.	"Welcome to the Working Week"	1:19
4.	"Less Than Zero"	4:08
5.	"The Beat"	3:33
6.	"Lip Service"	2:26
7.	"(I Don't Want to Go to) Chelsea"	3:56
8.	"Little Triggers"	2:47
9.	"Radio Radio"	2:33
10.	"Lipstick Vogue"	4:46
11.	"Watching the Detectives"	5:48
12.	"Miracle Man/Band Introduction"	4:07
13.	"You Belong to Me"	2:32
14.	"Pump It Up"	4:42
Total length:		48:48

== Charts ==
Chart performance for 2½ Years
Chart (1993)	Peak position
Australian Albums (ARIA)	193
