= Taking Liberties =

- The negative was reversed for this image of Costello in a phone booth.

Compilation album by Elvis Costello
- Released: November 1980 (US)
- Recorded: 1977–80
- Genres: Punk rock; new wave
- Length: 50:43
- Label: Columbia
- Producers: Elvis Costello; Nick Lowe

Elvis Costello chronology
Get Happy!! (1980)	Taking Liberties (1980)	Ten Bloody Marys & Ten How's Your Fathers (1980)

Taking Liberties is a compilation album by the English singer-songwriter Elvis Costello, consisting of tracks not previously released on his albums as released in the United States. It is largely made up of B-sides, and also features three previously unreleased recordings.

The album was released only in the US and Canada; its track listing is very similar to that of the UK release Ten Bloody Marys & Ten How's Your Fathers. The differences are that on the latter, the tracks "Night Rally", "Sunday's Best" and "(I Don't Want to Go to) Chelsea" are replaced by "Watching the Detectives", "Radio, Radio" and "(What's So Funny 'Bout) Peace, Love, and Understanding".

The sleeve note by Gregg Geller is very nearly a direct lift from the 1958 album A Gene Vincent Record Date, with Costello's name substituted for Vincent's, and song titles being substituted as appropriate.

The LP version features nostalgic Columbia labels. The legend on the Side One label reads "COSTELLO" instead of "COLUMBIA", in a similar fashion to This Year's Model.

== Critical reception ==
Record World said that the inclusion of previously unreleased material made Taking Liberties "the ideal way to complete any Elvis collection." Billboard praised the presence of Costello's backing band The Attractions on this release, saying that they were "always economical and just to the point." Cashbox called Taking Liberties "better than most artists' greatest hits packages."

Professional ratings
Review scores
Source	Rating
Allmusic	3.5/5 stars
Encyclopedia of Popular Music	4/5 stars
Robert Christgau	(B) link

== Track listing ==
All tracks are written by Elvis Costello, except "Getting Mighty Crowded" by Van McCoy and "My Funny Valentine" by Richard Rodgers and Lorenz Hart.

Side one
No.	Title	Original release	Length
1.	"Clean Money"	previously unreleased	1:57
2.	"Girls Talk"	B-side of "I Can't Stand Up For Falling Down", 1980	1:56
3.	"Talking in the Dark"	single, 1978	1:56
4.	"Radio Sweetheart"	B-side of "Less Than Zero", 1977	2:28
5.	"Black and White World" (demo)	previously unreleased	1:51
6.	"Big Tears"	B-side of "Pump It Up", 1978	3:10
7.	"Just a Memory"	B-side of "New Amsterdam", 1980	2:14
8.	"Night Rally"	This Year's Model (UK), 1978	2:40
9.	"Stranger in the House"	This Year's Model pack-in single, 1978	3:01
10.	"Clowntime Is Over No. 2"	B-side of "High Fidelity", 1980	3:39
Total length:			24:51

Side two
No.	Title	Original release	Length
1.	"Getting Mighty Crowded"	B-side of "High Fidelity"	2:05
2.	"Hoover Factory"	previously unreleased	1:43
3.	"Tiny Steps"	B-side of "Radio Radio", 1978	2:42
4.	"(I Don't Want to Go to) Chelsea"	This Year's Model (UK)	3:05
5.	"Dr Luther's Assistant"	B-side to "New Amsterdam"	3:30
6.	"Sunday's Best"	Armed Forces (UK), 1979	3:23
7.	"Crawling to the U.S.A."	from Americathon (Music from the Original Motion Picture Soundtrack), 1979	2:52
8.	"Wednesday Week"	B-side of "Talking in the Dark"	2:02
9.	"My Funny Valentine"	B-side of "Oliver's Army", 1979	1:25
10.	"Ghost Train"	B-side of "New Amsterdam"	3:05
Total length:			25:52

== Personnel ==
- Elvis Costello – vocals, guitar, keyboards; all instruments on "Black and White World", "Hoover Factory", "My Funny Valentine" and "Ghost Train"

The Attractions

- Steve Nieve – keyboards on all tracks except "Radio Sweetheart", "Black and White World", "Hoover Factory", "Dr. Luther's Assistant", "My Funny Valentine", "Ghost Train" and "Stranger in the House"
- Bruce Thomas – bass on all tracks except "Radio Sweetheart", "Black and White World", "Just A Memory", "Hoover Factory", "Dr. Luther's Assistant", "My Funny Valentine", "Ghost Train" and "Stranger in the House"
- Pete Thomas – drums on all tracks except "Radio Sweetheart", "Black and White World", "Just A Memory", "Hoover Factory", "My Funny Valentine", "Ghost Train" and "Stranger in the House"

Additional personnel

- Dave Edmunds – backing vocal on "Clean Money"
- John McFee (Clover) – guitar on "Radio Sweetheart" and "Stranger in the House"
- Nick Lowe – bass on "Radio Sweetheart"
- Mickey Shine (Clover) – drums on "Radio Sweetheart" and "Stranger in the House"
- Mick Jones – lead guitar on "Big Tears"
- Sean Hopper (Clover) – keyboards on "Stranger in the House"
- Johnny Ciambotti (Clover) – bass on "Stranger in the House"

== Charts ==
Year	Chart	Position
1980	US Billboard Top LPs & Tape	28
