= Back to Mine: Audio Bullys =

Mixtape by Audio Bullys
- Released: 4 November 2003
- Genre: Electronic
- Length: 65:27
- Label: Disco Mix Club
- Producer: Audio Bullys

Audio Bullys chronology
Ego War (2003)	Back to Mine: Audio Bullys (2003)	Generation (2003)

Back to Mine: Audio Bullys, compiled by electronic music duo Audio Bullys, is the fifteenth album in the Back to Mine series published by Disco Mix Club. Released in November 2003, the album features a new song by the duo entitled "All Burnt Out".

== Background ==
In the album's liner notes, frontman Simon Franks stated that Divine Madness by Madness was what piqued his interest in the band, and that "A Message to You, Rudy" was what prompted him to become interested in ska band the Specials, both of whose compositions appear on the album.

== Critical reception ==
Will Hodgkinson of The Guardian opined that "Franks' rough voice, the laddish lyrics and the music's club-drenched style make the Audio Bullys seem quite tough", with Oldies.com stating that "Franks adopts a vocal style somewhere between speech and song, but the music, geared by Dinsdale's sensibilities as a DJ, is propelled towards the dancefloor", going on to further describe the album as being "typically diverse". Marisa Brown of Rovi Corporation described the album as a "particularly rock heavy set". Rowan Shaeffer of Counterculture offered a different view, writing that the duo was unable to combine the tunes into a cohesive mix, citing abrupt changes in speed and style of music, with "Peaches" by the Stranglers being overpowered by "Out Of Space" by the Prodigy, and Marvin Gaye being swept away by the debut of the band's exclusive contribution to the album, "All Burnt Out", a composition that impressed Shaeffer.

== CD track listing ==
1. "My Girl" by Madness (2:46)
2. "Renegade Master" by Wildchild (4:26)
3. "Diamond Rings" by X-Presidents (2:32)
4. "Who's the Bad Man?" by Dee Patten (2:40)
5. "Peaches" by the Stranglers (4:11)
6. "Out of Space" by the Prodigy (3:56)
7. "Golden Brown" by the Stranglers (3:24)
8. "Strange Behaviour" by Roots Manuva (3:46)
9. "Blank Expression" by the Specials (2:07)
10. "Dub War" by Dance Conspiracy (4:55)
11. "All Day and All of the Night" by the Kinks (2:18)
12. "Up the Junction" by Squeeze (2:58)
13. "Live Your Life with Me" by Corrina Joseph (5:57)
14. "Find the Path (in Your Mind)" by New Horizons (4:00)
15. "What You Won't Do for Love" by Bobby Caldwell (4:44)
16. "Mercy Mercy Me (The Ecology)" by Marvin Gaye (3:09)
17. "All Burnt Out" by Audio Bullys (4:51)
18. "God Only Knows" by the Beach Boys (2:47)

The album was also released on vinyl as a three-LP set with the same tracks in a completely different order.
