= Jonas & François =

French directing team

Jonas & François (Jonas Euvremer, François Rousselet), born in 1982, is a French directing team of music videos and commercials. They are signed to Division Paris for global rep.

== Videography ==
2006

Kavinsky - "Testarossa Autodrive"

2007

Justice - "D.A.N.C.E."
Kanye West featuring T-Pain - "Good Life"

2008

Flairs - "Better than Prince"
The Presets - "Talk Like That"
Madonna featuring Justin Timberlake and Timbaland - "4 Minutes"

2009

Sébastien Tellier - "Kilometer"
Depeche Mode - "Peace"
Mr Hudson featuring Kanye West - "Supernova"
Muse - "Undisclosed Desires"

2010

Audio Bullys - "Only Man"
White Lies - "Bigger than Us"

2012

Labrinth - "Express Yourself"

2013

Electric Guest - "The Bait"
Iggy Azalea - "Work"
DJ Fresh vs. Diplo featuring Dominique Young Unique - "Earthquake"
Iggy Azalea featuring T.I. - "Change Your Life"

2014

Jack White - "Lazaretto"
BBC Music - "God Only Knows"

2015

Snoop Dogg featuring Charlie Wilson - "So Many Pros"

2017

Liam Gallagher - "Wall of Glass"

== Music Video Awards / Nominations ==
- D.A.N.C.E., Justice

MTV Europe Music Awards 2007 | Video Star
MTV Video Music Awards Japan 2008 | (Nomination) Best Dance Video

- The Good Life, Kanye West feat. T-Pain

MTV Video Music Awards 2008 | Best Special Effects
BET Hip Hop Awards 2008 | Video Of The Year

- 4 Minutes, Madonna feat. Justin Timberlake & Timbaland

MTV Europe Music Awards 2008 | (Nomination) Video Star

- Only Man, Audio Bullys

UK Video Music Awards 2010 | Best Visual Effects
D&AD 2011 | Silver Pencil Animation & Special Effects

- Work, Iggy Azalea

MTV Video Music Awards 2013 | (Nomination) Artist To Watch
UK Video Music Awards 2013 | (Nomination) Best Urban Video
UK Video Music Awards 2013 | (Nomination) Best Styling In A Video
World Music Awards 2014 | (Nomination) World's Best Video

- Change Your Life, Iggy Azalea

World Music Awards 2014 | (Nomination) World's Best Video
UK Video Music Awards 2014 | (Nomination) Best Urban Video

- Lazaretto, Jack White

UK Video Music Awards 2014 | (Nomination) Best Rock Video
