= Zoe Exclamation Mark =

Irish musician and trans punk bassist

- Origin: Dublin, Ireland
- Genres: Post-punk; punk rock; queercore
- Occupations: Musician; bassist; guitarist; vocalist
- Instruments: Bass guitar; guitar; vocals
- Years active: 2020s–present
- Member of: All Girls Piss

Zoe Exclamation Mark is an Irish trans woman musician and bassist based in Dublin, best known as a founding member of the punk band All Girls Piss.

== All Girls Piss ==
All Girls Piss is a Dublin-based "post-transsexual punk" band composed of Zoe Exclamation Mark (bass, guitar), EmberIHardlyKnowHer (guitar), Marcie Voyager (saxophone, keys), and Amber Excellent (drums), with all members contributing to vocals. The band describes themselves as coming "from an alternative future where people are chill with trans people" and characterise their ethos as placing transgender identity at the centre of a punk sensibility. The band is notable for its use of saxophone as a distinctive element in its punk sound and for expressive, theatrical stage performances.

All Girls Piss are part of a broader emerging trans punk scene in Dublin. Other bands in this scene include Big Tears (self-described as "Ramones on estrogen"), Touch Excellent, and Uptight Dad, all of whom cite punk's countercultural tradition as naturally aligned with transgender identity and community self-organisation. The bands were profiled together in issue 389 of GCN (Gay Community News) in June 2025.
