= Way Too Long =

Way Too Long may refer to:

- "Way Too Long" (Audio Bullys song), 2003
- "Way Too Long" (Nathan Dawe, Anne-Marie and MoStack song), 2021
