= Ten Bloody Marys & Ten How's Your Fathers =

Compilation album by Elvis Costello and the Attractions
- Released: 7 November 1980 (UK)
- Recorded: 1977–80
- Genres: Punk rock, new wave
- Length: 52:37
- Label: F-Beat
- Producers: Elvis Costello, Nick Lowe

Elvis Costello and the Attractions chronology
Taking Liberties (1980)	Ten Bloody Marys & Ten How's Your Fathers (1980)	Trust (1981)

Ten Bloody Marys & Ten How's Your Fathers is a compilation album by the English singer-songwriter Elvis Costello and his backing band the Attractions, comprising tracks not previously released on albums. It is largely made up of B-sides, but features one previously unreleased recording. It was released only in the United Kingdom, initially only on cassette, though later in other formats.

Its track listing is very similar to that of the North America-released album Taking Liberties; the differences are that on the latter, the tracks "Watching The Detectives", "Radio, Radio" and "(What's So Funny 'Bout) Peace, Love and Understanding" are replaced by "Night Rally", "(I Don't Want to Go to) Chelsea" and "Sunday's Best".

Professional ratings
Review scores
Source	Rating
AllMusic	3/5 stars
Encyclopedia of Popular Music	4/5 stars

== Track listing ==
All tracks are written by Elvis Costello, unless otherwise noted.

Side one
No.	Title	Length
1.	"Clean Money" (previously unreleased)	1:57
2.	"Girls Talk" (B-side of "I Can't Stand Up For Falling Down")	1:56
3.	"Talking in the Dark"	1:56
4.	"Radio Sweetheart" (B-side of "Less Than Zero")	2:24
5.	"Big Tears" (B-side of "Pump It Up")	3:10
6.	"Crawling to the USA" (from the Americathon motion picture soundtrack)	2:52
7.	"Just a Memory" (B-side of "New Amsterdam")	2:14
8.	"Watching the Detectives"	3:43
9.	"Stranger in the House"	3:01
10.	"Clowntime Is Over" (Version 2, B-side of "High Fidelity")	3:44

Side two
No.	Title	Writer(s)	Length
11.	"Getting Mighty Crowded" (B-side of "High Fidelity")	Van McCoy	2:05
12.	"Hoover Factory" (previously unreleased)		1:43
13.	"Tiny Steps" (B-side of "Radio Radio")		2:42
14.	"(What's So Funny 'Bout) Peace, Love and Understanding"	Nick Lowe	3:31
15.	"Dr Luther's Assistant" (from the EP single "New Amsterdam")		3:28
16.	"Radio Radio"		3:04
17.	"Black and White World (No. 2)" (previously unreleased)		1:51
18.	"Wednesday Week" (B-side of "Talking in the Dark")		2:02
19.	"My Funny Valentine" (B-side of "Oliver's Army")	Richard Rodgers, Lorenz Hart	1:25
20.	"Ghost Train" (B-side of "New Amsterdam")		3:05
Total length:			52:37

.
