= Shot You Down =

2005 single by Audio Bullys

Single by Audio Bullys featuring Nancy Sinatra

from the album Generation
- B-side: "I Won't Let You Down"
- Released: 23 May 2005
- Genre: Electro
- Length: 6:51 (original); 2:56 (radio edit)
- Label: Source; EMI; Virgin
- Songwriters: Sonny Bono; Tom Dinsdale; Simon Franks
- Producer: Audio Bullys

Audio Bullys singles chronology
"Way Too Long" (2003)	"Shot You Down" (2005)	"I'm in Love" (2005)

Nancy Sinatra singles chronology
"Burnin' Down the Spark" (2004)	"Shot You Down" (2005)	"Glory Road" (2009)

Audio video
- "Shot You Down" on YouTube

"Shot You Down" is a song by English electronic music project Audio Bullys featuring vocal samples from American singer Nancy Sinatra from her cover of the 1966 Cher song "Bang Bang (My Baby Shot Me Down)". It became a No. 3 hit in the United Kingdom in mid-2005 and reached the top 20 in Australia and the Netherlands the same year. The song is included on the Audio Bullys album Generation, released on 31 October 2005. "Shot You Down" was played during the 2005 Victoria's Secret Fashion Show, broadcast on CBS and headlined by Tyra Banks and Naomi Campbell.

== Track listings ==
UK CD single

1. "Shot You Down" (radio edit) – 2:56
2. "I Won't Let You Down" – 4:29

UK 12-inch single

A. "Shot You Down" (original) – 6:49
B. "Shot You Down" (Lee Cabrera "Lower East Side" mix) – 6:40

European and Australian CD single

1. "Shot You Down" (radio edit) – 2:56
2. "Shot You Down" (full length) – 6:48
3. "Shot You Down" (Lee Cabrera "Lower East Side" mix) – 6:46

== Charts ==
=== Weekly charts ===
Chart (2005)	Peak position
Australia (ARIA)	17
Australian Club Chart (ARIA)	16
Australian Dance (ARIA)	2
Belgium (Ultratip Bubbling Under Flanders)	4
Belgium Dance (Ultratop Flanders)	9
CIS Airplay (TopHit)	21
Europe (Eurochart Hot 100)	10
Greece (IFPI)	15
Hungary (Dance Top 40)	29
Ireland (IRMA)	22
Ireland Dance (IRMA)	3
Netherlands (Dutch Top 40)	17
Netherlands (Single Top 100)	23
Russia Airplay (TopHit)	17
Scotland Singles (Official Charts)	6
UK Singles (Official Charts)	3

=== Year-end charts ===
Chart (2005)	Position
Australian Club Chart (ARIA)	40
Australian Dance (ARIA)	14
CIS Airplay (TopHit)	89
Russia Airplay (TopHit)	80
UK Singles (OCC)	22

== Certifications ==
Region	Certification	Certified units/sales
United Kingdom (BPI)	Silver	200,000^{^}
^{^} Shipments figures based on certification alone.

== Release history ==
Region	Date	Format(s)	Label(s)	Ref.
Europe	23 May 2005	CD	Source; EMI; Virgin	
United Kingdom	23 May 2005	12-inch vinyl; CD	Source; EMI; Virgin	
Australia	11 July 2005	CD	Source; EMI	
