= Radio Radio =

1978 single by Elvis Costello

Single by Elvis Costello and the Attractions

from the album This Year's Model
- B-side: "Tiny Steps"
- Released: 20 October 1978
- Recorded: 1978
- Genre: New wave; power pop
- Length: 3:04
- Label: Radar Records
- Songwriter: Elvis Costello
- Producer: Nick Lowe

Elvis Costello and the Attractions singles chronology
"This Year's Girl" (1978)	"Radio Radio" (1978)	"Oliver's Army" (1979)

Music video
- "Radio Radio” on YouTube

"Radio Radio" is a song written by Elvis Costello and performed by Elvis Costello and the Attractions. The song originated as a Bruce Springsteen-inspired song called "Radio Soul" that Costello had written in 1974. In 1977, Costello reworked the song to feature a more aggressive arrangement and more direct, sarcastic lyrics that criticised the commercialism of British radio. Costello and the Attractions recorded the song around the time of his second album, This Year's Model.

"Radio Radio" was released as a standalone single in the United Kingdom in October 1978, reaching number 29. The track was appended onto the US version of their second album, This Year's Model, released earlier that year. The song has since seen critical acclaim, being marked as one of Costello's best by many writers and appearing on several compilation albums.

Costello and the Attractions famously performed the song live on the American television show Saturday Night Live in 1977. Originally scheduled to perform Costello's debut single "Less Than Zero", Costello abruptly switched songs live against the wishes of Columbia Records and SNL, leading to him not being invited back until 1989.

== Background ==
"Radio Radio" originated as a song titled "Radio Soul", which Costello had written in 1974 while a member of the pub rock band Flip City. "Radio Soul" featured a softer arrangement and, alongside an early version of "Living in Paradise", was one of the songs that Costello had sent to A&M Records before he got a record deal. Lyrically, this early version was, according to Costello, about "the idea that the radio broadcasting from within you was ultimately of more value than the radio in the dashboard or the wireless on the shelf". Costello described the song as a "shameless imitation" of Bruce Springsteen's songs from The Wild, the Innocent & the E Street Shuffle. He explained,

When I was sitting at home in England in 1975, in the thrall of Bruce Springsteen, he sort of made it feel like a big dream in America where a radio was playing and it was always the perfect song. And even though there's sadness in the song, I wanted to believe that somewhere it was like that and it wasn't like it was in the suburbs, where you couldn't hear any music you liked half the time. So that was a wishful song.

Provoked by the BBC's airplay ban on the Sex Pistols' song, "God Save the Queen", Costello revived "Radio Soul" in 1977 as "Radio Radio", a more cynical critique of the commercialisation of English radio. Costello explained that these new lyrics reflected the moment when "you get into the business of making records and you realise what it's really about is some guy going off with a big sack of money to give it to somebody with hookers and cocaine so that they play your record enough times that people get batted to death with it and that makes it a hit". He later described English radio as "a smug, soothing appeaser". When asked about the song's relevance in 2003, Costello stated:

Oh, you might as well just admit now that radio has nothing to do with music anymore—it's in the advertising business. There's a real skill to programming in an intelligent way, but nobody does that anymore. It's all done by computer, by committee. Radio is absolutely the enemy of music. They are my sworn and mortal enemy, and I will have nothing to do with them.

Costello's reworked ending to the song was inspired by performing with Tom Petty and the Heartbreakers in 1977 and hearing them play "Listen to Her Heart", as asserted by Petty.

== Release ==
Recorded either during the sessions for This Year's Model or slightly afterwards, "Radio Radio" was released as a standalone single in October 1978. The single peaked number 29 in the UK and number 93 in Australia. Costello attributed the relative lack of chart success to radio censorship, explaining, "Radio One realised it was anti-radio and not pro-radio when they listened to the lyrics of the verse instead of just the chorus, radio play stopped overnight and the record dropped like a stone. It was steaming away up until then".

The song was also added onto the American release of This Year's Model, replacing "(I Don't Want to Go to) Chelsea" and "Night Rally". Costello speculated that this was a reaction to the notoriety the song had achieved from its appearance on Saturday Night Live. The song was also accompanied by a music video.

Since its release, "Radio Radio" has appeared on several compilation albums, including The Best of Elvis Costello and the Attractions, The Very Best of Elvis Costello and The Attractions 1977–86, The Very Best of Elvis Costello, and The Best of Elvis Costello: The First 10 Years. The song also appeared on live albums Live at Hollywood High and Live at the El Mocambo.

=== "Tiny Steps" ===
The B-side for the single was the non-album track "Tiny Steps". In the liner notes for Armed Forces, Costello noted that the song was a contender for that album, but was rejected likely for being too similar to the sound of This Year's Model. The song contained themes of abuse, a reoccurring theme in Costello's work: he joked, "That song contains the densest and most neurotic juggling of words in order to simply state that promiscuity wears you out." It was later released on the compilation albums Taking Liberties and Ten Bloody Marys & Ten How's Your Fathers.

== Reception ==
"Radio Radio" has seen critical acclaim since its release. Mark Deming of AllMusic described the song as "certainly among [Costello's] most anthemic", while Matt LeMay of Pitchfork Media called it as "easily one of the glowing highlights of the man's entire career". Morgan Troper of PopMatters dubbed the song "one of Costello's most-discussed — and most-loved — compositions, and for good reason" and noted that "It's almost contrarian of Elvis to be railing against commercialisation and censorship in a gorgeous, entirely consumable pop song (as far as straightforward power pop songs go, this is one of Elvis' finest)".

"Radio Radio" has also been named one of Costello's best songs on several rankings. Ryan Prado of Paste named it Costello's best song, writing, "Costello's punk-as-fuck dissertation on corporate radio still seethes as red-faced to this day". Jim Beviglia of American Songwriter named it Costello's third best song, stating, "The song hit the nail on the head so hard that it drove that nail right through the homogenizing programming and thinly-veiled censorship that had already become standard practice at the time of the single's release in 1978". Jeremy Allen of The Guardian named the song one of the ten best Elvis Costello songs, praising the song's "sharp hook", "thumping rhythm", and "Steve Nieve's trademark swirly organ". Martin Chilton ranked the song number 19 on his top 40 list of best Costello songs, while Brian Hyatt of Entertainment Weekly named it one of his top 10 Costello songs.

== Saturday Night Live performance ==
The song made waves in the US after Costello and the Attractions performed the song on Saturday Night Live. Originally, the Sex Pistols had been invited to perform on the broadcast (hosted by Miskel Spillman, an elderly woman who won SNL's "Anybody Can Host" contest), but visa problems prevented the band from appearing. After the Ramones turned down the chance to fill in—Joey Ramone later wrote, "We don't substitute for anybody"—Elvis Costello and the Attractions were invited. A reference to Sex Pistols' manager Malcolm McLaren's inability to get his band visas was made by drummer Pete Thomas who, during the performance, wore a shirt with the words "Thanks Malc".

Costello was to perform two songs on SNL: "Watching the Detectives", which Costello felt was a "good choice for our opening number, as the Attractions had now made the song their own", and "Less Than Zero", Costello's debut UK single. Columbia Records had insisted that Costello perform the song, but Costello objected on the grounds that the song was too "low-key" and too old, and its subject matter—the song was about British fascist Oswald Mosley—was too unfamiliar for American audiences. SNL music director Howard Shore noted that Costello sought to buck pressure from his label during the show.

On the night of the performance, Costello and the Attractions began playing "Less Than Zero". After a few bars, he turned to the Attractions, waving his hand and yelling, "Stop! Stop!" He turned to the audience and said,

“I'm sorry, ladies and gentlemen, there's no reason to do this song here”.

Costello and the band then played "Radio Radio" instead. SNL producer Lorne Michaels was reportedly furious, giving Costello the finger throughout the duration of the performance. When asked about this, Costello replied, "I'm not going to say that's true. Bill Murray told me that at the 25th-anniversary party. He said, 'Don't let Lorne tell you he was in on the joke. I remember him doing that.' So I'm not saying it; Bill is saying it. Lorne can take it up with Bill. I don't know". Costello was not invited to perform on Saturday Night Live until 1989. He reflected, "It felt good, but it was hardly a revolutionary act".

Costello referenced the incident during SNL's 25th anniversary show in 1999, where he burst in on Beastie Boys during their performance of "Sabotage" and, after reprising his famous introduction of the song from the original performance, played "Radio Radio" with the Beastie Boys backing him.

Costello said later that the inspiration for the last-minute song change came from Jimi Hendrix's 1969 performance on the BBC television show The Lulu Show. Hendrix was scheduled to play his hit, "Hey Joe", but stopped midway, saying "I'm going to stop playing this rubbish". He then began performing Cream's "Sunshine of Your Love"—dedicating it to the recently broken-up Cream—until he was pulled from the air. Costello recalled, "It was like watching your television go out of control".

== Charts ==
Chart (1978)	Peak position
Australia (Go-Set)	93
UK Singles (Official Charts)	29

== Cover versions and later performances ==
"Radio Radio" has been covered by multiple other artists, often referencing the Saturday Night Live appearance. "Weird Al" Yankovic and his band have launched into a cover of "Radio Radio" when technical difficulties, such as a server crash, forced him to stop a song midway during a live performance. On 16 January 2012, indie rock musician St. Vincent performed a version of her song "Cheerleader" on Conan, before which she started with a cover of "Radio Radio" stopping seconds later and stating "I'm sorry ladies and gentlemen, there's no reason to play that song."
