= Ego War =

Studio album by Audio Bullys
- Released: 3 June 2003
- Recorded: 2002–2003
- Genre: Electronic; house
- Length: 60:16
- Label: Astralwerks
- Producer: Audio Bullys

Audio Bullys chronology
Ego War (2003)	Generation (2005)

Singles from Ego War
- 1. "We Don't Care" Released: 16 December 2002; 2. "The Things"/"Turned Away" Released: 17 December 2002; 3. "Way Too Long" Released: 25 February 2003; 4. "Snake" Released: 10 June 2003

Professional ratings
Aggregate scores
Source	Rating
Metacritic	75/100
Review scores
Source	Rating
AllMusic	4/5 stars
Blender	4/5 stars
Dotmusic	9/10
Drowned in Sound	7/10
The Guardian	4/5 stars
Mojo	3/5 stars
Pitchfork	7.4/10
Q	4/5 stars
Uncut	4/5 stars
URB	4/5 stars

Ego War is the debut studio album by British electronic duo Audio Bullys, released on 3 June 2003 by Source Records.

== Promotion ==
"We Don't Care" was the first single to be released from the album. The promotional video for the song had gained much controversy as it shows a young boy going through his life like an abrupt teenager. "We Don't Care" is featured on the Teen Wolf soundtrack and series 3 of Fresh Meat.

== Track listing ==
No.	Title	Length
1.	"Snake"	3:36
2.	"100 Million"	3:31
3.	"Way Too Long"	2:17
4.	"Turned Away"	4:20
5.	"Real Life"	3:30
6.	"We Don't Care"	3:30
7.	"Face in a Cloud"	3:44
8.	"The Tyson Shuffle"	3:39
9.	"The Things"	3:48
10.	"Veteran"	3:17
11.	"The Snow"	4:37
12.	"I Go to Your House"	3:34
13.	"Hit the Ceiling"	3:28
14.	"Ego War" (includes hidden track "Somewhere in the Middle" at 8:32)	13:27
Total length:		60:16

Japanese bonus tracks
No.	Title	Length
14.	"Ego War"	4:38
15.	"The Beginning"	5:40
16.	"Somewhere in the Middle"	4:52

Sample credits

- "Way Too Long" samples "(I Don't Want to Go to) Chelsea" as performed by Elvis Costello and the Attractions and written by Costello.
- "Face in a Cloud" samples "Marjorine" as performed by Joe Cocker and written by Cocker and Chris Stainton.
- "We Don't Care" samples "Big Bad Wolf" as performed by Bunny & the Wolf Sisters and written by Douglas Brayfield.
