= Only Man =

Single by Audio Bullys

from the album Higher Than the Eiffel
- Released: 22 March 2010
- Genre: Electronic rock
- Length: 3:20
- Label: Cooking Vinyl; Face Piece
- Songwriters: Simon Franks and Tom Dinsdale
- Producers: Jimmy Franks; Audio Bullys

"Only Man" is the eighth single from British electronic music duo Audio Bullys. The video for the song was directed by Jonas & François, and is featured on Higher Than the Eiffel, Ibiza Fever 2010, Global Gathering Festival Anthems, Clubbers Guide to Festivals and the similarly titled single from the band.

== Critical reception ==
The song was described by Max Feldman of PopMatters as being a "sizable club banger" while Lou Thomas of BBC Online goes on to characterize the tune as a "triumph of metallic guitar-ish samples, understated sax riffs and thumping Lo-Fidelity Allstars-echoing grooves" and that "Two tunes in and the motivation is clear: stop what you’re doing and dance". Alex Young of Consequence of Sound called it "a hit with an extremely creative and colorful video" with Joe Barton of The Skinny alludes to the "testosterone fuelled house" with an "incessant stomp".

Lizz Paige of Future Radio describes the tune as having a "thumping beat reminiscent of Daft Punk" but being "slightly too slow to dance to" with "complex and syncopated rhythms, vocals like Ian Brown and simple and repetitive lyrics that compound further the heaviness of the track", comparing the song to those of Gorillaz.

Contrarily, Ben Hogwood of musicOMH states that with the composition, the duo "take their urban ‘geezerness’ too far, and end up with songs that don't say very much", but continues to express that "it stands out simply because the rest of the album is strong, and at times affecting".

== Music video ==
The music video, directed by Jonas & François and produced by Jules Dieng of El Niño won the 2010 UK Music Video Awards for "Best Visual Effects" in a Video in association with BEAM.

== Chart performance ==
Chart (2010)	Peak position
UK Singles Chart	44

== Track listing ==
=== Digital and CD singles ===
1. Only Man (Album Version) - 3:21
2. Only Man (Reset! Remix) - 5:40
3. Only Man (Jakwob Remix) - 4:53
4. Only Man (Dave Spoon Remix) - 6:08

=== 12" vinyl ===
Side A

1. Only Man (Album Version) - 3:30
2. Only Man (Dave Spoon Remix) - 6:08

Side B

1. Only Man (Jakwob Remix)- 9:53

== Remixes ==
=== Dave Spoon Remix ===
- Featured on Ministry of Sound: In the Club! Vol. 2 (Ministry of Sound)

=== Jakwob Remix ===
- Featured on The Sound of Dubstep (Ministry of Sound), Generation Dubstep (Universal Records), Bass In Yer Face (Rhino Records)

=== Reset! Remix ===
- Featured on Global Gathering Festival Anthems (New State / New State Music / New State UK)

=== Rock Remix ===
- Featured as a hidden track on Higher Than the Eiffel

=== Other remixes ===
- Ash Howell Rework, Color Blaster remix, Muzzaik Remix, Netsky Remix
