= Higher Than the Eiffel =

Studio album by Audio Bullys
- Released: 29 March 2010
- Genre: House, big beat
- Length: 55:43
- Label: Cooking Vinyl
- Producer: Jimmy Franks; Audio Bullys

Audio Bullys chronology
| Generation (2005) | Higher Than the Eiffel (2010) |

Singles from Higher Than the Eiffel
- 1. "Only Man" Released: 22 March 2010

Professional ratings
Aggregate scores
| Source | Rating |
|---|---|
| Metacritic | 63/100 |
Review scores
| Source | Rating |
| Allmusic | 3.5/5 stars |
| BBC Music | (favorable) |
| ClashMusic.com | 6/10 |
| MusicOMH | 4/5 stars |
| PopMatters | 7/10; 4/10 |
| Q Magazine | (mixed) |
| Slant Magazine | 2.5/5 stars |

Higher Than the Eiffel is a 2010 album by the English electronic group Audio Bullys. It is their third studio album, released on 29 March 2010 and features the lead single "Only Man". The band collaborated with Madness frontman Suggs once again, after he appeared on their second album Generation. Suggs' bandmate keyboardist Mike Barson also collaborates on this album as well on the tracks "Twist Me Up" and "Goodbye".

== Track listing ==
1. "Drums (On with the Story)" – 3:38
2. "Only Man" – 3:21
3. "Daisy Chains" – 4:14
4. "Feel Alright" – 4:31
5. "Twist Me Up" – 3:12
6. "Dynamite" – 4:11
7. "Drained Out" – 2:57
8. "London Dreamer" – 4:01
9. "The Future Belongs to Us" – 4:55
10. "Shotgun" – 4:56
11. "Dragging Me Down" – 4:01
12. "Smiling Faces" – 4:02
13. "Kiss the Sky" – 3:14
14. "Goodbye" – 11:25 - Features hidden track "Only Man (RoK Remix)"
