= This Year's Model =

1978 studio album by Elvis Costello

- Original UK cover. (Note: The UK sleeve was off-centre and featured a printer colour bar on the right. Later reissues feature a properly aligned sleeve.) The original US and Swedish covers use slightly different shots.

Studio album by Elvis Costello (Note: The Attractions did not receive a sleeve credit on the original release but were credited on the LP labels. Later reissues are credited to Elvis Costello and the Attractions.)
- Released: 17 March 1978
- Recorded: December 1977 – January 1978
- Studio: Eden (London)
- Genres: New wave; power pop; punk rock; pop rock; garage rock
- Length: 35:14
- Labels: Radar; Columbia
- Producer: Nick Lowe

Elvis Costello (Note: The Attractions did not receive a sleeve credit on the original release but were credited on the LP labels. Later reissues are credited to Elvis Costello and the Attractions.) chronology
My Aim Is True (1977)	This Year's Model (1978)	Armed Forces (1979)

Singles from This Year's Model
- 1. "(I Don't Want to Go to) Chelsea" Released: 3 March 1978; 2. "Pump It Up" Released: June 1978; 3. "This Year's Girl" Released: 1978 (US)

This Year's Model is the second studio album by the English singer-songwriter Elvis Costello, released on 17 March 1978 through Radar Records. After being backed by Clover for his debut album My Aim Is True (1977), Costello formed the Attractions—keyboardist Steve Nieve, bassist Bruce Thomas and drummer Pete Thomas (no relation)—as his permanent backing band. Recording sessions took place at London's Eden Studios in eleven days between late 1977 and early 1978. Nick Lowe returned as producer, and Roger Béchirian acted as engineer. Most of the songs were written prior to the sessions, and debuted live during the latter half of 1977.

Embracing new wave, power pop and punk rock, the songs draw from bands such as the Rolling Stones and the Beatles. The lyrics explore subjects such as technologies of mass control and failing relationships, but in a manner that some reviewers found misogynistic. Echoing the lyrics of some of the tracks, the cover artwork, designed by the English graphic artist Barney Bubbles, shows Costello behind a camera on a tripod, emphasising his role as an observer.

The accompanying singles "(I Don't Want to Go to) Chelsea" and "Pump It Up" were commercially successful and the album reached number four on the UK Albums Chart. The American LP was released in May 1978 through Columbia Records, substituting "(I Don't Want to Go to) Chelsea" and "Night Rally" for "Radio Radio". It reached number 30 on Billboard's Top LPs & Tape chart. This Year's Model also received critical acclaim; reviewers highlighted strong songwriting and performances, while also admiring Costello and the band as artists. The album appeared on year-end lists in both the UK and the US.

In later decades, This Year's Model has been acclaimed as one of Costello's best works, some critics commenting on its influence on punk and new wave. It has appeared on several lists of the greatest albums of all time and has been reissued multiple times with bonus tracks. In 2021, Costello spearheaded a new version of the album titled Spanish Model, which featured songs from This Year's Model sung in Spanish by Latin artists over the Attractions' original backing tracks. It received favourable reviews and charted on several Billboard charts.

== Background ==
Elvis Costello was backed on his debut album My Aim Is True (1977) by the California-based country rock act Clover, whose laid-back approach he felt did not fit the sound of the times. Wanting a harder and sharper sound, he decided to assemble a permanent backing band. The first musician hired was Pete Thomas, former drummer of Chilli Willi and the Red Hot Peppers; the second hired was Bruce Thomas, a bassist whose previous involvements included several folk rock albums earlier in the decade; (Note: Although they have the same surname, Pete and Bruce are unrelated.) and last Steve Nieve, who had no prior band experience and had trained at the Royal College of Music. With Costello on guitar, he and the band, now named the Attractions, made their live debut on 14 July 1977. Shortly after the release of My Aim Is True eight days later, the group performed an unauthorised show outside a Columbia Records convention, which led to Costello's arrest. The stunt attracted the attention of record executive Greg Geller, who months later became integral in signing Costello to Columbia in the United States.

Costello and the band were on tour for most of the rest of 1977. The dates included the Greatest Stiffs Live Tour with other Stiff Records artists and their first tour of America. During this time, Stiff co-founder Jake Riviera departed Stiff due to disputes with the label's co-founder Dave Robinson. Per Costello's management contract, Costello followed Riviera and left Stiff for Radar Records but retained his American deal with Columbia. (Note: Lowe also left Stiff with Costello for Radar.) His final release for Stiff was that October's "Watching the Detectives", his first single to reach the UK top 20. In the meantime, Costello had written a large amount of new material which would appear on This Year's Model.

According to the author Graeme Thomson, Costello's reputation in the US grew faster than in the UK. He was acclaimed in publications such as Time and Newsweek and approached to appear on NBC's Saturday Night Live as a last-minute replacement for the Sex Pistols, which took place the day after the tour's end. During the appearance, Costello and the Attractions played "Watching the Detectives" and began "Less Than Zero" before Costello abruptly cut the band off and counted them into the then-unreleased "Radio Radio", a critique of the commercialisation of broadcasting. The impromptu stunt angered producer Lorne Michaels and resulted in Costello's banning from Saturday Night Live until 1989.

== Writing and recording ==
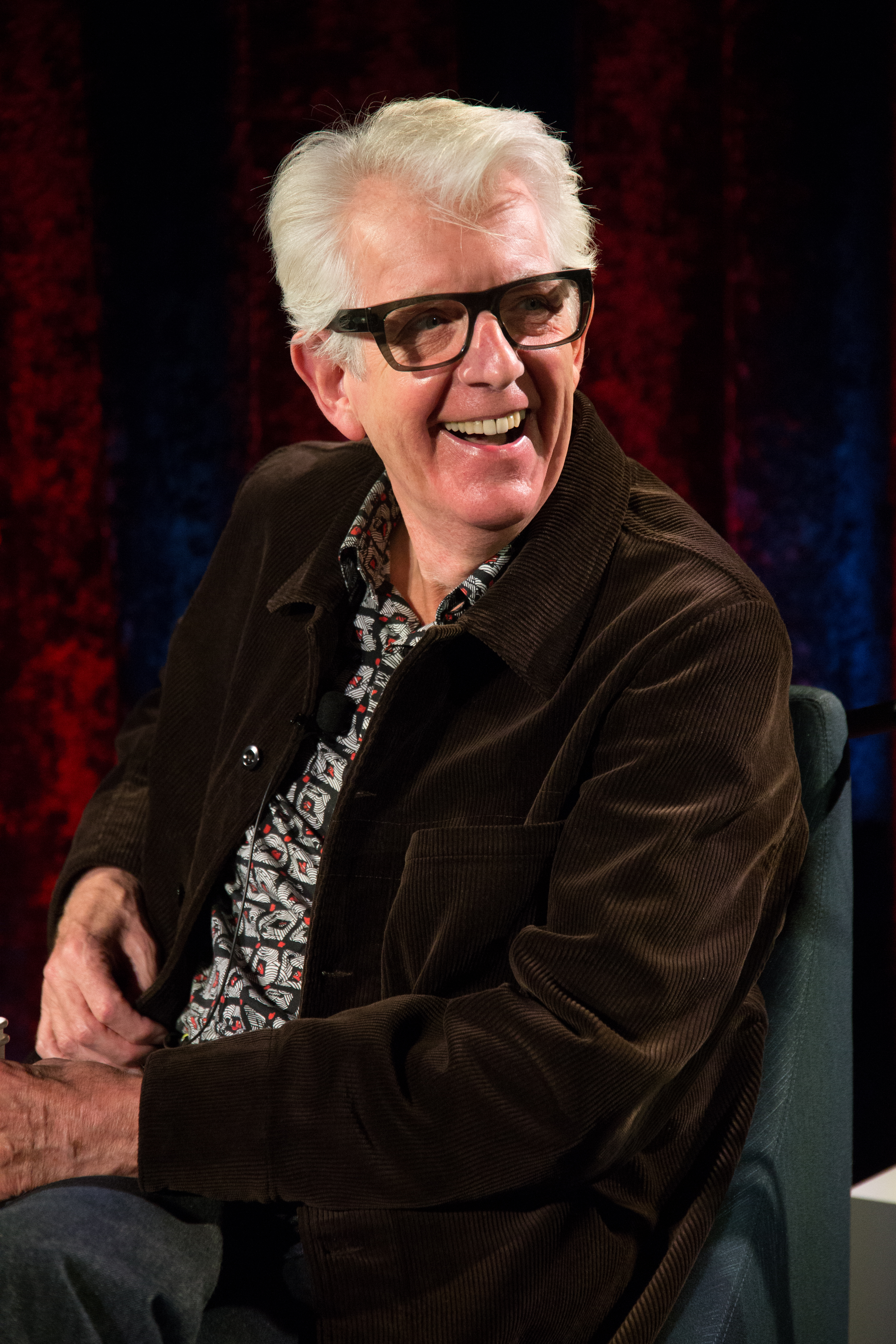
This Year's Model was the second of five consecutively produced Costello albums by Nick Lowe (pictured in 2017).

This Year's Model was recorded during a break in Costello's touring schedule. Recording took place at Eden Studios, a 24-track studio in Acton, London, beginning towards the end of December 1977 and completing in early January 1978. Costello later said the entire album was recorded in about eleven days. The band briefly paused to play a three-night residency at London's Nashville Rooms, which concluded on Christmas Eve 1977. Nick Lowe returned from My Aim Is True as producer and, in Thomson's words, was the "mad professor", pushing the band's energy further to attain the best performance. Like the debut, Lowe primarily wanted to capture the songs live with few overdubs. Acting as a foil to Lowe was engineer Roger Béchirian, who Costello recalled was tasked with interpreting Lowe's commands, such as "turn the drums into one big maraca" or "make it sound like a dinosaur eating cars". (Note: Béchirian continued to work with Costello on his next four Lowe-produced albums.)

Costello stayed at Bruce Thomas's flat during the sessions. According to Thomson, Costello remained focused despite keeping himself apart from his wife Mary during this time, which eventually led to their separation. Most of the songs had been written and performed live with the Attractions before the recordings. One of the final tracks written was "Pump It Up", which Costello began writing outside a hotel fire escape during the Live Stiffs tour, debuting the song two days later and properly recording it in the studio a week after that. Having frequently played the tracks live, the band were able to complete them with few overdubs; some of Costello's live guide vocals ended up in the final mix. Bruce Thomas recalled: "We literally did the best tracks on the album – "Pump It Up", "(I Don't Want to Go to) Chelsea" – in one afternoon. It was like Motown. We'd just go in, play them, and that was it." Despite the fast-paced nature of the sessions, Béchirian recalled Costello coming off the tour with "radiating energy":

He was a star almost overnight, and I think he was quite bemused by it all, swept up with the excitement. I have a great laughing image of him being fairly fresh-faced, like a little boy in a sweet shop.

Thomson says the sessions were "vibrant", productive and completed without difficulty. They began each day around 11 a.m. and finished around 9 p.m. According to Béchirian, "the whole thing was really good, it was really friendly, very positive. Everyone was really excited because they were the stars of the moment." Costello and the Attractions collaborated during the songwriting process. Although Costello preferred an "immaculate approach" to songwriting, wherein he would not present songs to the musicians until they were fully written, the Attractions offered suggestions that helped shape the songs. For "(I Don't Want to Go to) Chelsea", Costello based the guitar parts on the 1964 tracks "I Can't Explain" by the Who and "All Day and All of the Night" by the Kinks, which the band used to create new figures to make "Chelsea" stand out on its own. The band recorded several outtakes, including "Radio Radio" and "Big Tears", the latter featuring a guest contribution from the Clash guitarist Mick Jones. (Note: In the 2002 reissue's liner notes, Costello stated that "Big Tears" was the only "genuine" outtake from the This Year's Model sessions.) Other tracks written or demoed included "Crawling to the U.S.A.", "Running Out of Angels", "Green Shirt" and "Big Boys". (Note: "Green Shirt" and "Big Boys" were both recorded for Costello's next album, Armed Forces (1979).)

=== Mixing ===
The album was mixed at Eden by Béchirian with Lowe and Costello in attendance; Costello did not contribute due to his relative inexperience in the studio. (Note: Costello asserted himself more on the mixing of Armed Forces.) The mixing console had been custom-built by Béchirian in the early 1970s after the studio had changed locations. According to the author Mick St. Michael, Lowe intentionally made the record louder than its predecessor. Béchirian recalled in an interview with Mix magazine that Lowe's primary goal was to "make sure the bass sat in well with the kick" and to bring Costello's voice to the forefront. With the record completed, Costello and the Attractions toured America in January 1978.

== Music and lyrics ==
This Year's Model is a collection of songs that focused as much on Costello's recent success as on his by now patented emotional self-lacerations. Musically it seethed with tension, and this fitted the obsessive elements of the majority of the songs. ... Through the music, twitching and stuttering in a series of drum bursts, rents of organ and guitar arcs, the songs breathed as if through a gas mask – tight, controlled, afraid to splutter, claustrophobic, yet with a clear view of what was happening.

— Tony Clayton-Lea, Elvis Costello: A Biography

In the 2002 liner notes, Costello mentioned the Rolling Stones' Aftermath (1966) as a major influence on This Year's Model. Musically, the album embraces several styles, including new wave, power pop, punk rock, garage rock, and pop rock; St. Michael also recognised references to Merseybeat and glam. According to biographer Tony Clayton-Lea, rather than reusing the rockabilly and country sounds of My Aim Is True, This Year's Model opts for straightforward pop music "as influenced by punk rock". AllMusic editor Stephen Thomas Erlewine, on the other hand, defines the album as pure punk, with music that is "nervous, amphetamine-fueled, [and] nearly paranoid".

In a contemporary interview with Creem magazine, Costello said the record contained less humour than its predecessor: "It's more vicious overall but far less personal, though." Referencing technologies of mass control, from corporate logos to night rallies, Hinton writes that the lyrics are "strongly visual, as befits the voyeurism which fuels many of the songs". References to objects such as cameras, films and telephones are present throughout many tracks, in both positive and negative lights, which the author David Gouldstone argues creates a disillusioned world where greed and revenge are dominant. Like the cover artwork itself, the mechanical imagery emphasises observation rather than participation. Themes of uncertainty between reality and artifice previously emerged on "Watching the Detectives", and appear throughout This Year's Model on tracks such as "Pump It Up", "This Year's Girl" and "Living In Paradise". The author James E. Perone interprets songs like "Lipstick Vogue", "(I Don't Want to Go to) Chelsea" and "This Year's Girl" as relating to Costello's former job working at cosmetics and perfume company Elizabeth Arden.

Some reviewers identified themes of misogyny. In 1978, the writer Jon Pareles found the album "so wrong-headed, so full of hatred, [and] so convinced of its moral superiority" in Crawdaddy magazine. Drawing comparisons to Aftermath's similar lyrical content, Sounds magazine's Jon Savage said that "at least on occasion Elvis has the grace to make clear that it's a two-way process and he's at fault. Just wanna be your victim ...". Costello himself later wrote in the 2002 reissue's liner notes that he never understood the misogynistic accusations, believing they "clearly contained more sense of disappointment than disgust". Costello's failure to succeed romantically is the focal point of most of the relationships described in the album. Rolling Stone writer Kit Rachlis agreed, stating that all romances on the album are over or are about to commence, including a situation where he is unsure of whether to answer the phone or not ("No Action") or coming to terms after rejecting all compromises ("Lipstick Vogue").

=== Side one ===
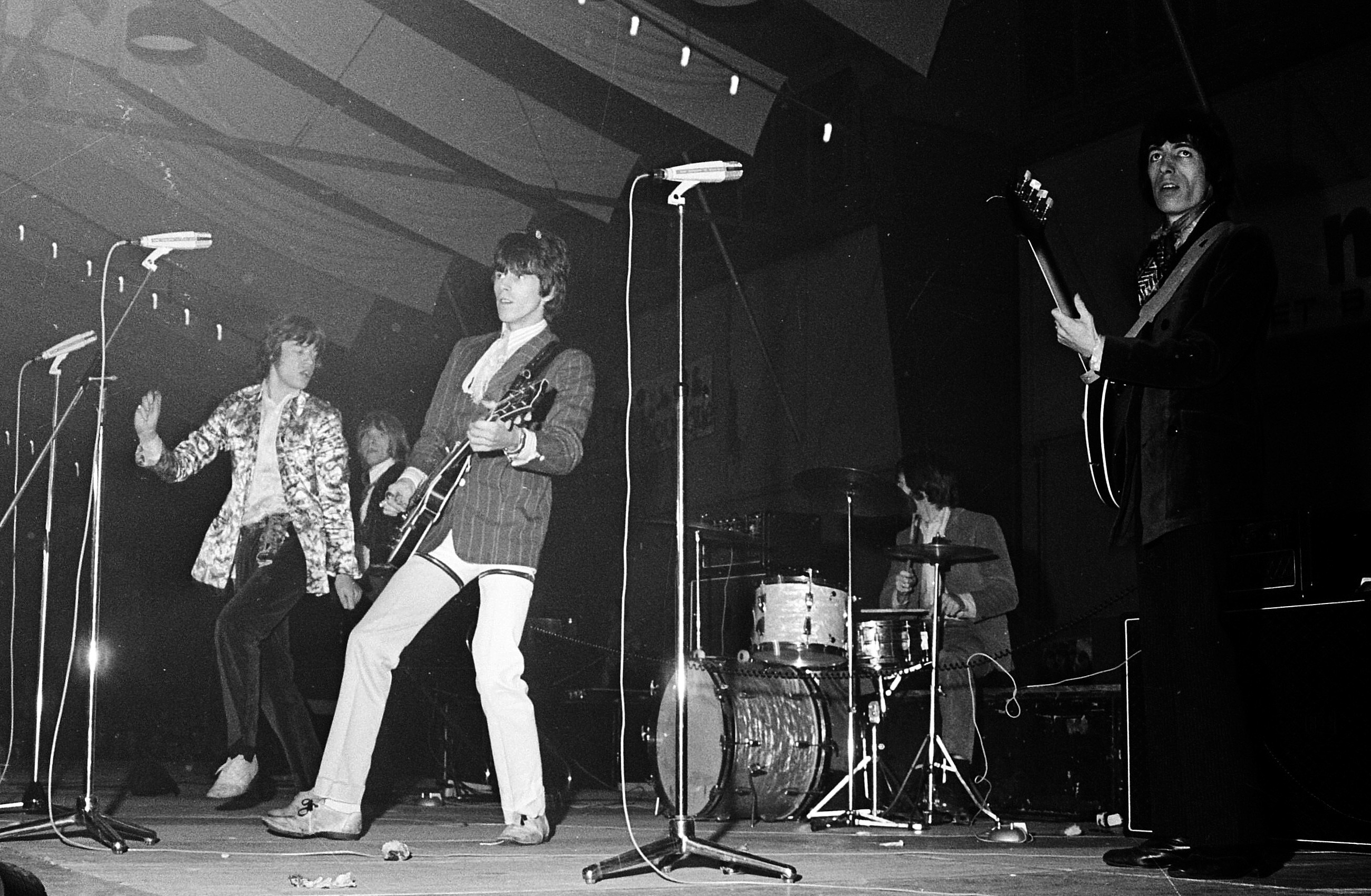
Several tracks on This Year's Model are influenced by the Rolling Stones (pictured in 1967); Costello himself cited their album Aftermath (1966) as a major influence.

"No Action" begins with Costello's solo voice. The lyrics detail the regret of a failed relationship. Gouldstone said that the song is the first example of Costello's use of "thematic punning", meaning the incorporation of references that indirectly relate to the song's main subject; "No Action", in this case, uses a telephone as comparisons to the narrator's companion. According to Costello, "This Year's Girl" was written as an "answer song" to the Rolling Stones' "Stupid Girl" (1965). Other influences included the mid-1960s works of the Beatles. In his 2015 memoir, Costello wrote that the song discusses how men see women and what they desire from them. The song's subject has achieved fame through fashion but it is only temporary, as by the next year, another girl will take her place. Once she realises it as time runs out, she feels cheated but by then it is too late. "The Beat" is primarily led by Nieve's keyboard and the rhythm section of Bruce and Pete Thomas. The song explores the uncertainties and pains of adolescence and early manhood, and Hinton regards it as the closest thing on the album to romantic love. It quotes Cliff Richard's "Summer Holiday" (1963) as a way to express enjoyment before the narrator is sought after by vigilantes.

"Pump It Up" was based on the stylings of Bob Dylan's "Subterranean Homesick Blues" (1965) and Chuck Berry's "Too Much Monkey Business" (1956). An energetic attack on a female chic society's member, the song takes place in a nightclub, where its self-important members aspire to fit into high society, seeking purpose. The vocals are fuelled by obsessive sexual desire, while the rhythmic guitar riff is likened by Gouldstone to heavy metal. Writing for AllMusic, Mark Deming stated that the song "perfectly captures the giddy but terrifying feeling of a wild, adrenaline-fueled all-night party that's dangling on the verge of collapse." A softer track changing from soft soul to Burt Bacharach, "Little Triggers" is about a failing relationship caused by the woman's indifference. The 'little triggers' refer to the small things that occur in the beginning of a relationship that make it meaningful, such as kissing, body-brushing and lip expressions. Rock Australia Magazine's Anthony O'Grady called it "a hypnotic, frustrated, hurt love song that's almost the mirror image of 'Alison' [from My Aim Is True]." "You Belong to Me" is heavily in debt to the Rolling Stones, using the same riff as "The Last Time" (1965). Lyrically, it is a plea for sexual freedom and is full of resentment and anger. Musically, AllMusic's Stewart Mason likens it to 1960s garage rock.

=== Side two ===
The track "Hand in Hand" opens with guitar feedback evoking the Beatles and Jimi Hendrix. Although the music provides a Merseybeat shuffle, the dark and revenge-driven lyrics follow two lovers walking hand in hand straight to Hell. Like "No Action" and My Aim Is True's "I'm Not Angry", the narrator tries to deal with chaotic emotions by denying they ever occurred. "(I Don't Want to Go to) Chelsea" is a ska-infected rocker that was originally directly influenced by the works of the Who, before Bruce and Pete Thomas contributed new rhythms that made the track stand out on its own. Lyrically, the song attacks fashionable society; the girl is described as 'last year's model', as she has suffered a fall from grace. According to Rachlis, "Chelsea represents Costello's nightmare world of success, where deceit is masked by propriety and last year's model is thrown out with yesterday's wash." "Lip Service" represents a culmination of Beatles influences into a track that contains sexual innuendos, both in its lyrics and title. It is primarily led by Bruce Thomas's bassline, which Hinton compares to the sound of the Hollies. The partially vague lyrics express a narrator's sexual frustrations on a would-be lover and observations on insincerity around him.

"Living in Paradise" was written in 1975 when Costello was a member of the pub rock band Flip City. O'Grady calls it as "shuffling power-pop reggae detailing how dreams of soft-living actualise in soul-decaying corruption". Morgan Troper of PopMatters maintained that it abandons the punk workings of the rest of the album for a ska-type rhythm. According to Gouldstone the track has themes already present in the album's other songs, including misogynistic ideals. "Lipstick Vogue" is described by AllMusic's Tom Maginnis as a showcase for the band's energy and skill. It opens with a drum fill by Pete Thomas before Bruce Thomas and Nieve drive on bass and keyboards, respectively. Reflecting themes of alienation, the song is about the perils of imperfect love. "Night Rally" provides commentary on the then-prevalent UK National Front. It presents, in Hinton's words, a "nightmare of state control and worse" that argues how totalitarianism infiltrates and affects society. Costello compares conglomerate corporations to these types of governments, in how they attempt to control the people. It cuts off abruptly, ending the album on, in St. Michael's words, "an explicit and disturbingly pessimistic note".

== Packaging and artwork ==
We wanted to catch people's eyes. If they said, 'Why is it printed off register?' as the initial pressing was, it was because we wanted people to ask exactly that. It meant they'd pause just that little bit longer in front of our sleeve.

— Elvis Costello on the cover

The original UK cover artwork for This Year's Model was deliberately off-centre, making the title appear as His Year's Model and the artist "Lvis Costello". The design by Barney Bubbles left a printers' colour bar intact along the right side. The American and Swedish sleeves were lined up correctly and not off-centre. Riviera's F-Beat Records released a May 1980 issue with an aligned sleeve, which has been retained for all subsequent releases.

Photographed by Chris Gabrin, the front cover depicts Costello in his signature black framed glasses, wearing a dark suit with a polka dot shirt, glaring from behind a camera on a tripod. In Thomson's words, he is "expressionless" and "both observed and observing". According to Hinton, it was a "careful reconstruction" of David Hemmings from Michelangelo Antonioni's Blow Up (1966). The British cover had Costello standing back with his hands open; on the American cover, he crouched forward with both hands gripping the camera like a gun; a third shot was also used for the Swedish release. The back cover depicts Costello and the Attractions in a small, dimly lit hotel room reacting to a television with mock horror. Three of them are wearing black ties while Nieve dons a V-neck pullover. The inner sleeve depicts a robotic hand gripping a miniature TV on which Costello is playing, standing on one leg, and the other side depicts four colour-coded and dismembered mannequin bodies wearing string vests in a laundromat. Hinton states that the label's gimmick at the time was off-centre sleeves and avant-garde inner fold images.

The Attractions were acknowledged on the LP labels but did not receive sleeve credits on the original release. The LP labels contain text between the holding spirals reading "Special pressing No. 003. Ring 434-3232. Ask for Moira for your prize". Packaged with the first 50,000 copies of the LP was a free 7" single containing "Stranger in the House", an outtake from My Aim Is True left off the album due to its country-influenced sound, with a live cover of the Damned's "Neat Neat Neat" as the B-side. The first American pressings contain Costello's rather than Columbia's logo.

== Release and promotion ==
The band's North American tour before the album's release lasted from January to early March 1978. The setlist consisted of tracks from both My Aim Is True and This Year's Model, as well as B-sides and covers. The tour was positively received, but contributed to the growing exhaustion of Costello and the Attractions.

Radar released the first single, "(I Don't Want to Go to) Chelsea", backed by "You Belong to Me", on 3 March 1978 in the UK, which received acclaim and reached number 16 on the UK Singles Chart. A performance in Toronto on 6 March was heavily bootlegged, and was eventually issued as Live at the El Mocambo in 1993 with the 2½ Years box set, and as a standalone release in 2009. This Year's Model was released in the UK on 17 March with the catalogue number RAD 3. Costello and the Attractions undertook a 28-date UK tour between March and April. The dates were plagued with problems, including Bruce Thomas cutting his hand smashing a glass bottle, requiring Lowe to substitute for him; Thomas wore bandages for the filming of promotional clips for "(I Don't Want to Go to) Chelsea" and "Pump It Up". Costello grew more exhausted from constant touring but continued writing new material. By the tour's end, This Year's Model had reached number 4 on the UK Albums Chart.

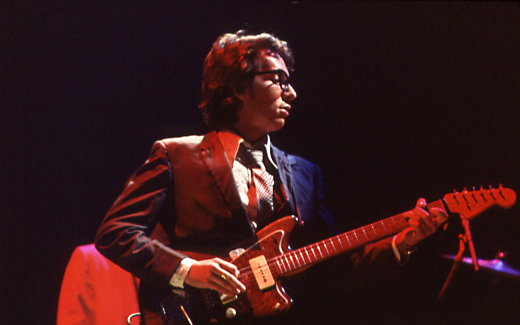
Costello onstage in April 1978, shortly after the release of This Year's Model.

Another US tour commenced just three days after the previous tour's end. With Bruce Thomas still unavailable, Costello brought back Clover guitarist John Ciambotti, who only had one day of rehearsal. Throughout the tour, Costello and the band continued the wild behaviour they had become known for—both on and off stage—and experienced an increase in drug use, lack of sleep and growing exhaustion. Songs that would appear on Costello's next album, 1979's Armed Forces, began appearing in the set-lists. This Year's Model was issued in the US in May 1978; Columbia substituted "(I Don't Want to Go to) Chelsea" and "Night Rally" with "Radio Radio" on the notion that the lyrics on both tracks were "too English". It reached to number 30 on Billboard's Top LPs & Tape chart. The Scandinavian release retained the UK track listing and added "Watching the Detectives" as the final track on side one. It reached number 10 in Sweden. Elsewhere, This Year's Model reached the top 20 in New Zealand (11), the Netherlands (14) and Norway (15), and the top 30 in Canada (21) and Australia (26).

The tour lasted until June 1978, after which the band again toured Europe. "Pump It Up", backed by "Big Tears", was released as the second single in June, which peaked at number 24 in the UK, earning Costello another appearance on BBC's Top of the Pops. In July, Costello recorded "Stranger in the House" with country artist George Jones, which appeared on the latter's My Very Special Guests album in 1979, before commencing the recording sessions for Armed Forces. "This Year's Girl", backed by "Big Tears", was issued as a US single. After appearing on the American LP, "Radio Radio" was released as a stand-alone single in the UK on 24 October 1978, backed by "Tiny Steps".

== Critical reception ==
Professional ratings
Initial reviews
Review scores
Source	Rating
DownBeat	5/5 stars
Music Week	4/4 stars
Record Mirror	4/5 stars
Sounds	4.5/5 stars
The Village Voice	A

This Year's Model was well received on release. Many critics deemed it superior to My Aim Is True, praised the Attractions as a better band than Clover, and highlighted the strong songwriting and performances. (Note: Attributed to multiple references:) Melody Maker's Allan Jones called it "an achievement so comprehensive, so inspired, that it exhausts superlatives". He wrote that "the penetration of the language matches the vaulting hysteria of the performance" and concluded that the record "promotes its author to the foremost ranks of contemporary rock writers", such as Bruce Springsteen. Cash Box remarked that This Year's Model allowed Costello to surpass early comparisons of Springsteen and Graham Parker to establish his own identity. Rock Australia Magazine's Anthony O'Grady dubbed This Year's Model "the best collection of...fashion-conscious songs since Ray Davies [of the Kinks] started his 'Dedicated Follower of Fashion' period." Tom Zito of The Washington Post had a hard time recalling an artist whose sophomore record surpassed their "already impressive" debut.

Costello is currently the best. There's simply no-one within spitting distance of him. He has his finger on the pulse of this desperate era and his perceptions are so disquieting because all too often they're too damn real to be strenuously ignored. ... Meanwhile, Model is just too powerful, too dazzling to be ignored or sidestepped.

— Nick Kent, NME, 1978

Several reviewers placed Costello as one of the best British New Wave artists. (Note: Attributed to multiple references:) In Circus magazine, Fred Schruers lauded his lyrics, musicianship and angry persona, and cited This Year's Model as having fulfilled "every new wave expectation". Robert Christgau of The Village Voice also saw Costello's emotional delivery as full of anger and grimace, which he found "more attractive musically and verbally than all his melodic and lyrical tricks". In the midst of the punk movement, Christgau acknowledged the genre's influence on the album and artist. Creem's Alan Madeleine found the artist proves himself "stylistically mindful": he is "distinct enough from any other extant act to be noted, yet cautious of excess experimentation in this establishmental sophomore phase." Record Mirror's Tim Lott considered the songs "less vicious" than its predecessors, but said the artist remains an "Aladdin's cave of anti-matter". He called Costello's voice "insubstantial but wiry", the music "clever in its very lack of detail", and compared the organ-heavy sound with Blondie: a Sixties sound "trapped for ten years on atmospherics". Naming This Year's Model the winner of May 1978's "disc derby" in the Los Angeles Times, Robert Hilburn wrote that Costello's vocals "bristle with conviction and bite that we rarely find in rock in the '70s". Other critics highlighted Lowe's production. (Note: Attributed to multiple references:)

Some critics were less enthusiastic. Savage felt Costello was "less than likable" and the Attractions "spare yet full", but ultimately considered the album "an excellent, soon-to-be-popular" record. In Rolling Stone, Rachlis believed the album was more "musically and thematically" cohesive than My Aim Is True, but not "diminish[ing] the prodigal brilliance" of its predecessor. Conversely, Joel Selvin of the San Francisco Chronicle found "no new surprises" on Model, but felt the songs improved on the style exhibited on Aim, concluding that it "should satisfy his growing legion of fans, as well as gain new converts". In The New York Times, John Rockwell described This Year's Model as a "fine" record that maintains all of the artist's previous angry energy, yet "filling out the arrangements with a richness of texture (organ especially) that is very appealing". Pareles was critical of the overtly misogynistic themes.

This Year's Model was voted the best album of 1978 by both Melody Maker and The Village Voice. It was highly placed in other year-end lists by Rolling Stone, NME (3), Record Mirror (5) and Sounds (8).

== Legacy and influence ==
Professional ratings
Retrospective reviews
Review scores
Source	Rating
AllMusic	5/5 stars
Blender	5/5 stars
Chicago Tribune	4/4 stars
The Encyclopedia of Popular Music	5/5 stars
Entertainment Weekly	A
Pitchfork	10/10
Q	5/5 stars
The Rolling Stone Album Guide	5/5 stars
Spin Alternative Record Guide	10/10
Uncut	5/5 stars

This Year's Model continues to receive critical acclaim. Journalists praise the Attractions' music, describing them as one of the best backing bands in rock music. Gouldstone wrote that with Costello on guitar, they became a band who are "capable of making even mediocre music listenable and of giving Costello's greatest songs an enthralling sense of intensity and immediacy." Erlewine described them as giving the album a "reckless, careening feel", further commending the sound, concluding that "Costello and the Attractions never rocked this hard, or this vengefully, ever again." Writing for Pitchfork in 2002, Matt LeMay said they were the reason the album was superior to My Aim Is True, and that "it's not only a more complex and dynamic album, but also one that steers well clear of the retro guitar twang that marred the less interesting bits of his debut." Declaring This Year's Model not only Costello's best, but one of the best albums ever made, he stated that it balanced the "raw energy" of its predecessor with the "more elegant pop songwriting" of his later works." Writing for Blender magazine, Douglas Wolk considered the Attractions "perfect creative foils" for Costello, particularly signalling out Nieve's playing throughout the record.

Critics consider This Year's Model one of Costello's best, and "angriest", works. Spin's Al Shipley argued that Costello was never able to surpass the record's "inventive punch", while Michael Gallucci of Ultimate Classic Rock deemed it the work that "bridged his brief past with his wide-open future". Troper deemed it Costello's "most consistent" release and finest with the Attractions, finding it the artist's "most live-sounding, most punk, and most honest record of his dauntingly expansive career". PopMatters writers Jason Mendelsohn and Eric Klinger hailed the album as "simple, refreshing, and surprisingly modern" and "an object lesson that the New Wave could compete on the old school's field", respectively. Consequence of Sound's Ryan Bray named it the first of Costello and the Attractions' eight-year run he nicknamed "murderer's row". Reviewing in 2008, Rolling Stone's Rob Sheffield named This Year's Model as an album everyone should own, saying the songs "remain brutally funny, sung with moments of unexpected tenderness". Regarding Costello's musicianship, Uncut's Paul Moody argued that after he "dispensed with his musical safety net entirely" from My Aim Is True, This Year's Model began "his insatiable urge to 'bite the hand that feeds me'." The album was not without its detractors. Mojo magazine's Jim Irvin was more mixed on the material and arrangements, overall finding the album "unfeasibly invigorating" following its "mild-mannered" predecessor, but liked Lowe's production.

Some reviewers mention the album's influence on punk and its evolution into new wave. In 2002, Uncut magazine's Chris Roberts called Costello the "bitter bard of the punk era", writing that with This Year's Model, he "articulat[ed] a generation's ire every bit as caustically as the [Sex] Pistols' gigantic guitars". Bray cited it as the album that proved pop and punk could co-exist. Writing for Record Collector in 2008, Terry Staunton cited it as "the post-punk distillation of the times", especially in London, and ten years later, Nick Hasted named it the "template" for the transition from punk to new wave. Regarding the album's position in the new wave genre, punknews.org's Julie River described This Year's Model as one of the first and strongest new wave albums, ultimately standing as one of Costello's finest albums. Paste magazine's Andy Whitman went further, describing the album as "the moment when New Wave found its frontman". Both River and Whitman agreed the album has aged well.

Thomson described the songs as "tight and instantly memorable", and mentioned Costello's improved songwriting and the Attractions' performances. Hinton considers it "light years ahead" of its predecessor, creating a "paranoid universe, where everyone is being watched." St. Michael similarly writes that the record "provokes and invokes" the listener as much as it entertains. In The Words & Music of Elvis Costello, Perone calls This Year's Model one of the "strongest sophomore efforts of any singer-songwriter", arguing that it affirmed the seeds that outlined on My Aim Is True that predicted the artist's future projects. The author also comments that it debuted one of the strongest four-piece rock bands of the era.

Black Francis of Pixies named the album as a favorite, recalling, "The [album] I listened to the most [at college], though, was This Year's Model. ... Instead of studying I'd go in [my room] and listen to Elvis Costello over and over until my ears hurt and my head couldn't take it anymore".

=== Rankings ===
This Year's Model often appears on lists of the greatest albums of all time. In 2000 Q placed it at number 82 on its list of the "100 Greatest British Albums Ever". In 1987, Rolling Stone placed the album at number 11 on its list of the best of the past 20 years, and said that Costello charted "the modern romantic terrain with keen cynicism, caustic wit and furious energy." The same magazine ranked the album number 98 in its list of the 500 Greatest Albums of All Time in 2003, maintaining the rating in a 2012 revised list, and dropping to number 121 in a 2020 revised list. In lists compiling the 100 greatest albums of all time, Mojo, NME and Spin ranked This Year's Model at numbers 69, 40 and 8 in 1995, 1985 and 1989, respectively. NME listed it at number 256 in their 2013 list of the 500 Greatest Albums of All Time. In a 2018 issue selecting 70 landmark albums of the past 70 years, Record Collector chose This Year's Model as their pick for 1978. In 2004, Pitchfork's Sam Ubl ranked it the 52nd best album of the 1970s, calling it "one of [Costello's] most deceptive rock records", and in 2012, Paste placed it at number 35 in a similar list. Ultimate Classic Rock also included it in their list of the 100 best rock albums from the decade. Paste magazine also ranked it the 19th greatest new wave album in 2016. The album was included in the 2018 edition of Robert Dimery's book 1001 Albums You Must Hear Before You Die.

== Reissues ==
Professional ratings
2008 reissue
Review scores
Source	Rating
Pitchfork	7.0/10
Record Collector	4/5 stars
Rolling Stone	5/5 stars

This Year's Model was first released on CD through Columbia and Demon Records in January 1986. Its first extended reissue came in October 1993 through Demon in the UK and Rykodisc in the US, which added the bonus tracks "Radio Radio", "Crawling to the U.S.A.", "Running Out of Angels", "Greenshirt" and "Big Boys". The 2002 CD reissue by Rhino Entertainment added more tracks on top of the 1993 additions; with this release, "Radio Radio" was sequenced as the album closer after "Night Rally". Troper argues that the addition changes the record's tone immensely, stating that as "Radio Radio" is more upbeat, it brings the album to a proper conclusion compared to the disturbing imagery and abrupt ending of "Night Rally".

In 2008, it was reissued again by Universal/Hip-O Records as a deluxe edition, featuring most of the same tracks as the Rhino reissue, with the addition of a 13-track live bonus disc taken from a show at the Warner Theater in Washington, D.C., on 28 February 1978. For its 2021 remaster by UM^{e}, "Big Tears" was added before "Radio Radio" on the standard album, bringing the total track count to 14.

== Track listing ==
=== Original album ===
All tracks are written by Elvis Costello, unless otherwise noted.

Side one
No.	Title	Length
1.	"No Action"	1:57
2.	"This Year's Girl"	3:16
3.	"The Beat"	3:42
4.	"Pump It Up"	3:12
5.	"Little Triggers"	2:38
6.	"You Belong to Me"	2:19

Side two
No.	Title	Length
7.	"Hand in Hand"	2:30
8.	"(I Don't Want to Go to) Chelsea"	3:06
9.	"Lip Service"	2:34
10.	"Living in Paradise"	3:51
11.	"Lipstick Vogue"	3:29
12.	"Night Rally"	2:40
Total length:		35:14

Notes

- The US release dropped "(I Don't Want to Go to) Chelsea" and "Night Rally" and added "Radio Radio" to close side two. The 2002 Rhino reissue added "Radio Radio" after "Night Rally" as the album closer, and the 2021 remaster added "Big Tears" before "Radio Radio".

=== Rykodisc reissue ===
No.	Title	Length
1.	"No Action"	1:58
2.	"This Year's Girl"	3:17
3.	"The Beat"	3:45
4.	"Pump It Up"	3:14
5.	"Little Triggers"	2:40
6.	"You Belong to Me"	2:22
7.	"Hand in Hand"	2:33
8.	"(I Don't Want to Go to) Chelsea"	3:07
9.	"Lip Service"	2:36
10.	"Living in Paradise"	3:52
11.	"Lipstick Vogue"	3:29
12.	"Night Rally"	2:41

Extended play
No.	Title	Length
13.	"Radio, Radio"	3:05
14.	"Big Tears" (Guitar – Mick Jones)	3:09
15.	"Crawling to the USA"	2:53
16.	"Running Out of Angels" (Demo)	2:02
17.	"Greenshirt"	2:20
18.	"Big Boys" (Demo)	3:00
Total length:		52:03

=== 2002 Edsel Records reissue ===
CD one
No.	Title	Length
1.	"No Action"	1:58
2.	"This Year's Girl"	3:17
3.	"The Beat"	3:45
4.	"Pump It Up"	3:14
5.	"Little Triggers"	2:40
6.	"You Belong to Me"	2:22
7.	"Hand in Hand"	2:33
8.	"(I Don't Want to Go to) Chelsea"	3:07
9.	"Lip Service"	2:36
10.	"Living in Paradise"	3:52
11.	"Lipstick Vogue"	3:29
12.	"Night Rally"	2:41
13.	"Radio, Radio"	3:05

CD 2
No.	Title	Writer(s)	Length
14.	"Big Tears" (Guitar – Mick Jones)		3:09
15.	"Crawling to the USA"		2:53
16.	"Running Out of Angels" (Demo)		2:02
17.	"Greenshirt"		2:20
18.	"Big Boys" (Demo)		3:00
19.	"You Belong to Me" (Capital Radio Version)		1:55
20.	"Radio, Radio" (Capital Radio Version)		3:01
21.	"Neat Neat Neat" (Live)	Brian James	3:16
22.	"Roadette Song" (Live)		5:40
23.	"This Year's Girl" (Alternate Eden Studios Version)		2:09
24.	"(I Don't Want to Go To) Chelsea" (Basing Street Studios Version)		3:00
25.	"Stranger in the House" (BBC Version)		4:15
Total length:			75:29

=== Hip-O Records Deluxe Edition (2008) ===
CD one
No.	Title	Length
1.	"No Action"	1:58
2.	"This Year's Girl"	3:17
3.	"The Beat"	3:45
4.	"Pump It Up"	3:14
5.	"Little Triggers"	2:40
6.	"You Belong to Me"	2:22
7.	"Hand in Hand"	2:33
8.	"(I Don't Want to Go to) Chelsea"	3:07
9.	"Lip Service"	2:36
10.	"Living in Paradise"	3:52
11.	"Lipstick Vogue"	3:29
12.	"Night Rally"	2:41
13.	"Radio, Radio"	3:05

Bonus Material: B-sides, Demos, Live Tracks, Alternates, Etc.
No.	Title	Writer(s)	Length
14.	"Big Tears" (Guitar – Mick Jones)		3:09
15.	"Crawling to the USA"		2:53
16.	"Tiny Steps"		2:44
17.	"Running Out of Angels" (Demo Version)		2:02
18.	"Greenshirt" (Demo Version)		2:20
19.	"Big Boys" (Demo Version)		3:00
20.	"Neat Neat Neat" (Live, Saxophone – Davey Payne)	Brian James	3:16
21.	"Roadette Song" (Live, Saxophone – Davey Payne)	Ian Dury, Russell Hardy	5:38
22.	"This Year's Girl" (Alternate, Eden Studios Version)		2:09
23.	"(I Don't Want To Go To) Chelsea" (Alternate, Basing Street Studios Version)		2:57

CD two: Live at The Warner Theater, Washington, DC, February 28, 1978
No.	Title	Length
1.	"Pump It Up"	3:33
2.	"Waiting for the End of the World"	3:59
3.	"No Action"	2:28
4.	"Less Than Zero"	4:28
5.	"The Beat"	3:43
6.	"(The Angels Wanna Wear My) Red Shoes"	2:35
7.	"(I Don't Want to Go To) Chelsea"	3:57
8.	"Hand in Hand"	2:53
9.	"Little Triggers"	3:07
10.	"Radio Radio"	2:37
11.	"You Belong to Me"	2:54
12.	"Lipstick Vogue"	5:02
13.	"Watching the Detectives"	6:01
14.	"Mystery Dance"	3:20
15.	"Miracle Man"	4:20
16.	"Blame It on Cain"	3:58
17.	"Chemistry Class"	3:32

== Personnel ==
According to the liner notes of the 2002 reissue:

- Elvis Costello – guitar, vocals
- Steve Nieve – keyboards
- Bruce Thomas – bass
- Pete Thomas – drums

with:

- Mick Jones – lead guitar on "Big Tears"

Technical

- Nick Lowe – producer, mixer
- Roger Béchirian – engineer

== Charts and certifications ==
=== Weekly charts ===
Weekly charts for This Year's Model
Chart (1978–79)	Peak Position
Australian Albums (Kent Music Report)	26
Canadian Albums (RPM)	21
Dutch Albums (MegaCharts)	14
New Zealand Albums (RIANZ)	11
Norwegian Albums (VG-lista)	15
Swedish Albums (Sverigetopplistan)	10
UK Albums Chart	4
US Billboard Top LPs & Tape	30
US Cash Box Top 100 Albums	43
US Record World Album Chart	44

=== Certifications ===
Sales certifications for This Year's Model
Region	Certification	Certified units/sales
Canada (Music Canada)	Gold	50,000^{^}
United Kingdom (BPI)	Gold	100,000^{^}
United States (RIAA)	Gold	500,000^{^}
^{^} Shipments figures based on certification alone.

== Spanish Model ==
Spanish Model

Remix album by Elvis Costello and the Attractions
- Released: 10 September 2021
- Genre: Pop
- Length: 59:05
- Language: Spanish
- Label: UM^{e}
- Producers: Elvis Costello; Sebastian Krys

Elvis Costello chronology
Hey Clockface (2020)	Spanish Model (2021)	The Boy Named If (2022)

Singles from Spanish Model
- 1. "Pump It Up" Released: 15 July 2021

In 2018, Costello collaborated with singer Natalie Bergman for a new version of "This Year's Girl" for the second season of the American television series The Deuce. For this version, Costello and his frequent collaborator, producer Sebastian Krys, added new vocals from Bergman alongside Costello's originals. The project led Costello to conceive a reimagining of This Year's Model entirely in Spanish. The project, titled Spanish Model, features 16 songs from the This Year's Model period sung by an array of Latin artists, including Juanes, Jorge Drexler, Luis Fonsi, Francisca Valenzuela, Fuego, Draco Rosa and Fito Páez, replacing Costello's original vocals but retaining Costello and the Attractions' original backing instrumentation. (Note: Some of Costello's original vocals were retained for a couple of tracks, including "Pump It Up" and "Radio Radio".)

In a 2021 interview with Mojo, Costello said that he had three requirements for the project: he wanted a lesser-known line-up, each singer would translate his or her own song and the Attractions' original backing tracks would be used. He was insistent on the quality of the band's performances: "Take my voice out of it and the playing from Pete, Bruce and Steve is sensational." As a non-Spanish speaker, Costello and Krys worked with songwriters Elsten Torres, Ximena Muñoz, Luis Mitre and Andie Sandoval to translate the lyrics. Costello told Rolling Stone:

The thing with the translation, and we've discovered a lot over the record, [is that] the Spanish adaptation makes the melodies sound a little different, because the sound elements are different. I sing with a lot of, shall we say, attitude, particularly then. With songs like 'Hand in Hand' and 'Living in Paradise', I didn't realise these songs had melody — I thought it was just me sneering. I didn't realise they had tunes until I heard them sung by more melodious singers in another language.

The lyrics themselves are not literal translations. The first track completed was Cami's reinterpretation of "This Year's Girl" titled "La Chica de Hoy", which literally means "the girl of today". Costello explained that it has the same ideas as the original track, but Cami introduced reflections from her own career. "Radio Radio" was given "the most radical change" due to the track's now-outdated themes. "Night Rally" and "Chelsea" were also given changes to instead reflect the rise of Spanish fascism and the updated location of Miami, respectively. Krys originally intended to mimic Lowe and Béchirian's original mix, but decided it worked better when he mixed the backing tracks around the new vocals.

Many of the Latin performers connected with the music on the original album. La Marisoul, a huge fan of Costello's, felt honoured to sing "Little Triggers", now titled "Detonantes". The artist approached the track by saying "Okay, I'm gonna live in these lyrics". For "Radio Radio", Fito Páez amended it to the current era where he presented himself "like this old dinosaur who goes back to his little radio to listen to Elvis Costello". Juanes, who recalled watching the music video for "Pump It Up" on MTV, offered a Spanish take on the lyric's events for his version of the song. Francisca Valenzuela, who sang "Hand In Hand" with Luis Humberto Navejas, cited This Year's Model and Imperial Bedroom (1982) as her favourite records by Costello and was delighted when she was approached for the project, stating: "I think it reflects something we're all interested in, which is the multiculturalism and syncretism of music." Draco Rosa was thrilled at the opportunity to provide a new and natural take on "The Beat", titled "Yo Te Vi".

Preceded by the release of Juanes's "Pump It Up" on 15 July 2021, Spanish Model was issued on 10 September through record label UM^{e} and was packaged with the 2021 remaster of the original album. Costello said in a statement: "Part of the fun of this project is its unexpected nature. Although, I think people in my audience that have been paying attention are pretty much used to surprises by now." Speaking to Mojo, he stated that the Attractions, Lowe and Béchirian all responded positively to Spanish Model.

Spanish Model earned Costello and the Attractions their first top-ten entry on a Billboard Latin chart, reaching number six on Latin Pop Albums. It also charted at number 50 on the Top Album Sales, number 32 on the Top Current Album Sales and number 38 on the Billboard Top Latin Albums. The album debuted to 2,000 album-equivalent units in the US the week of 16 September 2021.

=== Critical reception ===
Professional ratings
Aggregate scores
Source	Rating
Metacritic	75/100
Review scores
Source	Rating
AllMusic	3.5/5 stars
Mojo	3/5 stars
PopMatters	7/10
Under the Radar	7.5/10

Spanish Model has been favourably reviewed by music critics. Erlewine commended the new vocals, stating that the Latin singers retain the "barbed humour" and "spiky politics" of the original album. He believes the new songs improved the project overall and expand the "musical and emotional palette", creating an album that was "not as a curiosity but rather a small wonder, revealing new dimensions of the original recording while opening up these songs for new audiences". Mojo's John Aizlewood found the project unnecessary but refreshing.

In PopMatters, Marty Lipp cited the project as a complete display of the Attractions' strength as a band and recognised how many of the Latin singers on the project were female, which represented a "striking reversal" of the "she done me wrong" mentality that pervaded a majority of Costello's early work. He felt that the absence of Costello's "brilliantly cynical wordplay" did the album more harm than good, particularly on "Pump It Up", but considered the project "still as exciting and fun as ever" and commended Costello for continuing to surprise his fans. Matthew Berlyant in Under the Radar magazine called the project unique and praised Costello for taking a major left turn almost 45 years into his career. He highlighted the rearranged track listing and additions to the original record as making the project stand on its own, concluding that Costello succeeded in both bringing attention to the original album and the Spanish-speaking artists that enveloped Spanish Model.

=== Track listing ===
Spanish Model track listing
No.	Title	Performer	Length
1.	"No Action"	Nina Diaz	2:12
2.	"(Yo No Quiero Ir A) Chelsea" ("(I Don't Want to Go to) Chelsea")	Raquel Sofía & Fuego	3:39
3.	"Yo Te Vi" ("The Beat")	Draco Rosa	3:47
4.	"Pump It Up"	Juanes	3:28
5.	"Detonantes" ("Little Triggers")	La Marisoul	2:42
6.	"Tú Eres Para Mí" ("You Belong to Me")	Luis Fonsi	2:50
7.	"Hand in Hand"	Francisca Valenzuela and Luis Humberto Navejas	2:34
8.	"La Chica de Hoy" ("This Year's Girl")	Cami	3:29
9.	"Mentira" ("Lip Service")	Pablo López	2:38
10.	"Viviendo en el Paraíso" ("Living in Paradise")	Jesse & Joy	3:59
11.	"Lipstick Vogue"	Morat	3:32
12.	"La Turba" ("Night Rally")	Jorge Drexler	2:42
13.	"Llorar" ("Big Tears")	Sebastián Yatra	3:10
14.	"Radio Radio"	Fito Páez	3:09
15.	"Crawling to the U.S.A."	Gian Marco and Nicole Zignago	2:47
16.	"Se Está Perdiendo La Inocencia" ("Running Out of Angels")	Vega	2:08
17.	"(I Don't Want to Go to) Chelsea" (Dub Mix)	Fuego and Raquel Sofía	3:33
18.	"Pump It Up" (Duet Mix)	Juanes	3:14
19.	"Pump It Up" (Brutal Mix)	Elvis Costello and the Attractions	3:22
Total length:			59:05

=== Charts ===
Weekly charts for Spanish Model
Chart (2021)	Peak Position
US Latin Pop Albums (Billboard)	6
US Top Album Sales (Billboard)	50
US Top Current Album Sales (Billboard)	32
US Top Latin Albums (Billboard)	38
