= Audio Bullys =

English electronic music project

- Origin: London, England
- Genres: Electro house; big beat
- Years active: 2001–2012; 2014–present
- Labels: Astralwerks; Source; Cooking Vinyl; Spinnin'
- Members: Simon Franks; Tom Dinsdale

Audio Bullys are a British electronic music project from London, consisting of Simon Franks and Tom Dinsdale.

Franks and Dinsdale released their debut album Ego War in 2003, and two years later followed up with Generation, which featured a collaboration with Suggs and keyboardist Mike Barson of Madness on the track "This Road" and a collaboration with Suggs and Madness saxophonist Lee Thompson on the subsequent track "Struck by the Sound". Their 2005 hit "Shot You Down", which sampled the Nancy Sinatra version of the song "Bang Bang (My Baby Shot Me Down)", reached number 3 in the UK Singles Chart.

Their third album Higher Than the Eiffel, released on 29 March 2010, featured another collaboration with Suggs and Barson on the track "Twist Me Up", with Suggs' daughter Viva providing backing vocals on the track "Smiling Faces".

In celebration of the 20th anniversary of Ego War, Audio Bullys launched their comeback with a new collaboration with Michael Bibi on Solid Grooves, featuring a fresh take on the iconic vocals of “We Don’t Care” from Simon Franks.

In 2025, DJs from Mars remixed "We Don't Care" with David Guetta.

== Discography ==
=== Studio albums ===
Title	Album details	Peak chart positions							Certifications
Title	Album details	UK	UK Dance	UK Down.	UK Indie	FRA	NED	SCO	Certifications
Ego War	Released: 3 June 2003; Label: Source (#SOUR073); Formats: CD, LP	19	—	—	—	129	86	21	UK: Silver
Generation	Released: 31 October 2005; Label: Source (#SOUR107); Formats: CD, LP	33	3	—	—	—	36	42	
Higher Than the Eiffel	Released: 29 March 2010; Label: Source (#BULLY1); Formats: CD, LP, download	87	10	55	9	—	—	—	
"—" denotes items that did not chart or were not released in that territory.

=== Compilation albums ===
- Back to Mine: Audio Bullys (2003)

=== Singles ===
Year	Title	Peak chart positions										Certifications	Album
Year	Title	UK	UK Dance	UK Down.	UK Indie	AUS	FRA	IRE	ITA	NED	SCO	Certifications	Album
2003	"We Don't Care"	15	—	—	3	—	—	—	—	97	20		Ego War
2003	"The Things"/"Turned Away"	22	—	—	—	—	—	—	—	—	29		Ego War
2003	"Way Too Long"	—	—	—	—	—	—	—	—	86	—		Ego War
2004	"Snake"	45	—	—	—	—	58	—	—	100	—		Ego War
2004	"Break Down the Doors" (Morillo featuring Audio Bullys)	44	4	—	5	—	—	—	—	86	52		Non-album single
2005	"Shot You Down" (featuring Nancy Sinatra)	3	—	2	—	17	—	22	56	23	6	UK: Silver	Generation
2005	"I'm in Love"	27	21	—	—	—	—	43	—	72	28		Generation
2006	"Drop It"	200	35	—	19	—	—	—	—	—	—		Non-album single
2008	"Gimme That Punk"	—	9	—	7	—	—	—	—	—	—		Non-album single
2008	"Flickery Vision"	—	—	—	—	—	—	—	—	—	—		Non-album single
2008	"Dope Fiend"	—	—	—	—	—	—	—	—	—	—		Non-album single
2010	"Only Man"	44	6	47	3	—	—	—	—	—	41		Higher Than the Eiffel
2011	"Shotgun"	—	—	—	—	—	—	—	—	—	—		Higher Than the Eiffel
2015	"Wicked Things" (Sander Kleinenberg featuring Audio Bullys)	—	—	—	—	—	—	—	—	—	—		Non-album single
2015	"Under Pressure" (with Alex Kidd)	—	—	—	—	—	—	—	—	—	—		Non-album single
2016	"It Was a Very Good Year" (featuring Surge)	—	—	—	—	—	—	—	—	—	—		Non-album single
2017	"The Scene"	—	—	—	—	—	—	—	—	—	—		Non-album single
2023	"As We Step"	—	—	—	—	—	—	—	—	—	—		Non-album single
2024	"Dilate"	—	—	—	—	—	—	—	—	—	—		Non-album single
2024	"Outlaws" (with Anti-Up)	—	—	—	—	—	—	—	—	—	—		Non-album single
2024	"Paperwork" (with TCTS)	—	—	—	—	—	—	—	—	—	—		Non-album single
"—" denotes items that did not chart or were not released in that territory.
