= Way Too Long (Audio Bullys song) =

Single by Audio Bullys

from the album Ego War
- Released: 1 September 2003
- Length: 2:14 (album version); 2:54 (video edit)
- Label: Source
- Songwriter(s): Audio Bullys; Elvis Costello
- Producer(s): Audio Bullys

Audio Bullys singles chronology
"Turned Away" (2003)	"Way Too Long" (2003)	"Snake" (2003)

"Way Too Long" is a song recorded by British duo Audio Bullys, it was released as the fourth single of their debut album Ego War on 1 September 2003 by record label Source.

== Composition ==
"Way Too Long" is a "shouted" staccato rap track. The song contains a sample of a "tiny little guitar lick" from Elvis Costello & The Attractions’ 1978 song “(I Don't Want to Go to) Chelsea”. The song tells the fictional story of "Stevie," whom Simon Donohue from Manchester Evening News described as "some dodgy drug dealing fella [sic] who falls foul of the people he thought were his mates."

== Critical and commercial reception ==
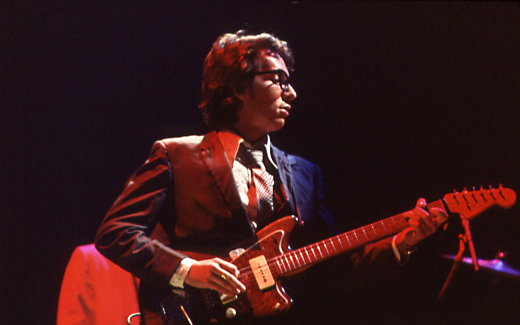
The duo was praised for their sampling of Elvis Costello & The Attractions’ 1978 song “(I Don't Want to Go to) Chelsea” on the track.

Simon Donohue of Manchester Evening News opened his review by saying: "If The Streets' Mike Skinner was the amiable southern geezer, then [Audio Bullys] sound like the scoundrels who nick his mobile phone on the last tube home." Despite stating that the song is not the "best piece of bait" for their album, the writer still called it "strangely endearing." Adrien Begrand of PopMatters disagreed, he praised the song for being "spectacular" despite its only over two minutes length. The author also praised their use of Costello and The Attractions' sample as "jaw-dropping" and "mesmerizing."

The single is their first failed to chart in the United Kingdom, however, it was the duo's first song to chart on Netherlands' Single Top 100. Debuting on the chart at number 86 on 13 September 2003, the song dropped to number 98 on its second and last week.

== Music video ==
The music video of "Way Too Long" was directed by British director Jake Nava.

== Track listings and formats ==
UK 12" single

1. "Way Too Long" (Switch Remix) – 5:51
2. "Way Too Long" (D's BHQ Rub) – 7:23

UK enhanced maxi single

1. "Way Too Long" (Album Version) – 2:14
2. "Way Too Long" (Switch Remix) – 5:51
3. "Way Too Long" (Derrick L. Carter's BHQ Rub) – 7:23
4. "Way Too Long" (Video Edit) – 2:54
5. "Way Too Long" (Video) – 3:21

== Credits ==
Credits adapted from the liner notes of Ego War.

Recording and management

- Published by EMI Music Publishing Ltd./BMG Music Publishing Ltd.

Personnel

- Audio Bullys – writing, production, performer, mixing
- Elvis Costello – writing
- Alan Mawdsley – mixing

== Charts ==
Chart performance for "Way Too Long"
Chart (2003)	Peak position
Netherlands (Single Top 100)	86
