= Generation (Audio Bullys album) =

Studio album by Audio Bullys
- Released: 31 October 2005
- Recorded: 2004–2005
- Genres: Big beat; EDM
- Length: 48:22
- Labels: Source (UK); Astralwerks (US)
- Producer: Tom Dinsdale

Audio Bullys chronology
Ego War (2003)	Generation (2005)	Higher Than the Eiffel (2010)

Singles from Generation
- 1. "Shot You Down" Released: 23 May 2005; 2. "I'm in Love" Released: 24 October 2005

Professional ratings
Aggregate scores
Source	Rating
Metacritic	44/100
Review scores
Source	Rating
AllMusic	2.5/5 stars
Alternative Press	3/5 stars
Blender	1/5 stars
Dotmusic	4/10
The Guardian	1/5 stars
NME	3/10
Pitchfork	2.7/10
PopMatters	3/10
Rolling Stone	2/5 stars
Slant Magazine	3/5 stars

Generation is the second studio album by the electronic music group Audio Bullys, released on 31 October 2005. It features the singles "Shot You Down", which reached number 3 on the UK Singles Chart, and "I'm in Love" (released 24 October 2005).

Two Promo versions of the album were released on CD by Source/EMI. One of these (CDSOURDJ107) features a different track order, a different shorter mix of I Won't Let You Down, and 3 extra tracks that were pulled before the final album release.

== Track listing ==
No.	Title	Length
1.	"Intro"	0:40
2.	"Shot You Down" (featuring Nancy Sinatra)	3:34
3.	"Keep on Moving"	3:55
4.	"Generation"	3:21
5.	"I Won't Let You Down"	5:41
6.	"(The World)"	0:33
7.	"Eq-ing"	4:00
8.	"Made Like That" (featuring Roots Manuva & Mr. Fox)	4:08
9.	"All Sing Along"	3:44
10.	"Get Myself on Track"	3:47
11.	"I'm in Love"	2:56
12.	"Take You There"	2:59
13.	"This Road" (featuring Suggs)	3:35
14.	"Struck by the Sound"	5:06

Japanese bonus track
No.	Title	Length
15.	"The Music Game"	2:15

Promo version (17 Tracks)
No.	Title	Length
1.	"Intro"	0:40
2.	"Shot You Down" (featuring Nancy Sinatra)	3:34
3.	"Keep on Moving"	3:54
4.	"Bring Light"	4:18
5.	"Generation"	3:22
6.	"I Won't Let You Down"	4:31
7.	"(The World)"	0:33
8.	"Eq-ing"	4:02
9.	"Made Like That" (featuring Roots Manuva)	4:08
10.	"All Sing Along"	3:40
11.	"Get Myself on Track"	3:48
12.	"I'm in Love"	2:54
13.	"Struck by the Sound"	5:05
14.	"This Road" (featuring Suggs)	3:24
15.	"Take You There"	2:59
16.	"If You Want My Love"	3:20
17.	"Rock Till I'm Rollin'"	3:35

== Samples ==
- "Shot You Down" is based around a sample of the Nancy Sinatra's Bang Bang (My Baby Shot Me Down)
- "Made Like That" uses sample from Bill Conti's "Going the Distance"
- "Keep on Moving" samples Steely Dan's "Midnite Cruiser"
- "Take You There" uses a sample from Dr. Hook & the Medicine Show's "In Over My Head".

== Chart positions ==
Chart (2005)	Peak position
Dutch Albums (Album Top 100)	36
