= This Year's Girl (song) =

Single by Elvis Costello and the Attractions

from the album This Year's Model
- B-side: "Big Tears"
- Released: 17 March 1978
- Recorded: 1977–1978
- Studio: Eden, London
- Genre: New wave
- Length: 3:16
- Label: Radar
- Songwriter: Elvis Costello
- Producer: Nick Lowe

Elvis Costello and the Attractions singles chronology
"Pump It Up" (1978)	"This Year's Girl" (1978)	"Radio Radio" (1978)

"This Year's Girl" is a song written by new wave musician Elvis Costello and performed by Costello and the Attractions for his 1978 album This Year's Model. Inspired by the Rolling Stones song "Stupid Girl", the song's lyrics criticizing fashion saw some critics allege misogyny, a theme which Costello strongly denied was present in the song in subsequent interviews.

Released on This Year's Model and on a single in the US, the song has since seen positive critical reception and has been included in compilation albums and in Costello's live setlists. The song has also been featured as the theme song to the second season of The Deuce, featuring additional vocals by Natalie Bergman.

== Background ==
"This Year's Girl" was written by Costello as an "answer song" to the 1966 Rolling Stones song, "Stupid Girl". He explained the relationship between the songs, "My lyrics might have been tough on the girl but it was full of regret and a little sympathy, while the Jagger–Richards song seemed to take delight in being heartless and cruel". Costello summarized the song as being "about an idea of glamour and attraction".

The lyrics of "This Year's Girl" resulted in Costello being criticized for attacking women. Costello rebuked these accusations, saying. "Everything in the song is about the way men see women and what they desire from them. If there is a lie being told, then it is the one that a girl might be prepared to live or tell, in order to live up to some false ideal of attraction. That may contain disappointment and be critical, but it hardly constitutes hatred". Costello also compared it positively against "Stupid Girl", saying, "The Stones wrote 'Stupid Girl' and they're heroes. I wrote 'This Year's Girl', saying that fashion is a trap, a much more compassionate song, and everyone said I was a misogynist".

During the intro of "This Year's Girl", Costello plays a Gretsch Country Club guitar that he had bought in San Francisco during the making of the album. The song features a stop-start drum beat from Pete Thomas which has been compared by critics to the drum track on the Beatles' 1965 song "Ticket to Ride". Costello added maracas and "Mersey vocal harmonies" to the track to mimic the 50s rock and roll influence of the song.

== Release and reception ==
"This Year's Girl" was released as the second track on Costello's 1978 sophomore album, This Year's Model. It was not released as a single in Costello's native UK, but a single of the song with B-side "Big Tears" was issued in the US. It did not chart there. The song has since appeared on Costello compilations, such as Girls Girls Girls. An alternate version of the song has been released on later editions of This Year's Model.

"This Year's Girl" has generally received positive attention from music critics. Cash Box said that it's "a clever and meaningful statement about the double-edged adoration of idols." Record World called it "one of the best r&r singles of the year." Matt LeMay of Pitchfork Media praised Pete Thomas' drumming on the song, explaining, "He keeps the beat deep and powerful, putting accents in all the right places without ever attempting to take the spotlight off the freak up front". Jim Beviglia of American Songwriter ranked the song as the 14th best Elvis Costello song ever, calling the track "a song that has no expiration date on its excellence". The Daily Telegraph's Martin Chilton named the song Costello's 34th best.

In 2018 a version of "This Year's Girl" featuring supporting vocals by Natalie Bergman was used as the theme song for season 2 of the HBO drama series The Deuce. The show's music supervisor, Blake Leyh, was a punk-rock fan and wanted a female-sung track that would be historically accurate to the show. He explained the process, "Elvis and his producer Sebastian Krys got hold of the original multitrack master tapes so that we could take the song apart and reconstruct it as a male–female duet. We tried quite a few different approaches to the duet, using different singers and different edits of the song. Sebastian had worked with Natalie before and suggested her as someone who could hold her own against Elvis' original vocal, and when we combined their voices the idea worked."

== Live history ==
Since its release in 1978, "This Year's Girl" has been a mainstay of Costello's live setlist. A live version of the track appears on Live at Hollywood High, where, during the intro to the song, Costello engages the crowd, asking "Are they any girls here tonight?" and, when the crowd's response was too meek, jokes, "Well I think me and the fellas better go home then, if there are no girls here..." During his 2018 tour, Costello performed the song as the opening track at his concerts.
