= Pump It Up (Elvis Costello song) =

- Artwork for UK and Dutch vinyl singles

Single by Elvis Costello and the Attractions

from the album This Year's Model
- B-side: "Big Tears"
- Released: 10 June 1978
- Genre: New wave
- Length: 3:17
- Label: Radar
- Songwriter: Elvis Costello
- Producer: Nick Lowe

Elvis Costello and the Attractions singles chronology
"(I Don't Want to Go to) Chelsea" (1978)	"Pump It Up" (1978)	"This Year's Girl" (1978)

Official video
- Elvis Costello & The Attractions – Pump It Up on YouTube

"Pump It Up" is a 1978 song by Elvis Costello and the Attractions. It originally appeared on Costello's second album This Year's Model, which was the first he recorded with the backing group the Attractions. It was written as a response to his time during the Stiffs Live Tour and inspired by "Subterranean Homesick Blues" by Bob Dylan.

Released as a single, the track reached number 24 in the UK. It has since become one of Costello's most well-known songs, appearing on several compilation albums and being listed by critics as one of Costello's greatest songs. The song was also accompanied by a video filmed with a fisheye lens.

== Background ==
The song was intended as a commentary on the Stiffs Live Tour, which Costello had participated in. The tour had been notable for its debauchery; Ian Dury's "Sex & Drugs & Rock & Roll" served as the setlist's official closing song. Costello later said of the lyrics, "It was a satire. If you listen to the lyrics, it kind of goes against the grain of hedonism". He later said, "Well, just how much can you fuck, how many drugs can you do before you get so numb you can't really feel anything?"

Musically, the song was inspired by Bob Dylan's "Subterranean Homesick Blues"; in his 2015 autobiography Unfaithful Music and Disappearing Ink, Costello explained,

'Pump It Up' obviously took more than a little bit from 'Subterranean Homesick Blues'. One night, many years later, Bob Dylan said to me: 'U2! How could they do that to you? How could they take your song like that?' It took me a moment to know what he was talking about, and a moment more to realize that he was putting me on. But then, U2's 'Get On Your Boots' was probably to 'Pump It Up' what 'Subterranean Homesick Blues' is to Chuck Berry's 'Too Much Monkey Business'.

The song was recorded quickly; bassist Bruce Thomas recalled, "We literally did the best tracks on [This Year's Model]—"Pump It Up", "Chelsea"—in one afternoon. It was like Motown. We'd just go in, play them, and that was it". Costello later said of the track, "I think 'Pump It Up' is a pretty good rock & roll record, of that simple sort of thing, and it's good fun to play".

== Lyrics and music ==
AllMusic critic Stephen Thomas Erlewine described "Pump It Up" as being "underscored with sexual menace", while the same site's Mark Deming described the track as "an unblinking look at the physical and emotional costs of what some call the rock & roll lifestyle". Like many of Costello's songs, "Pump It Up" features frequent double entendres, with the surface-level references to pumped-up music masking the song's description of "a risqué encounter with a girl so enticing, [Costello] likens her to a narcotic", according to The Virginian-Pilot's Amy Poulter.

Musically, the song is driven by what Deming describes as "a hard, stomping groove that rocks hard but demands to be danced to", driven by bassist Bruce Thomas and drummer Pete Thomas. Deming also notes the presence of "slashing guitar" from Costello. The song features a prominent organ performance by Steve Nieve that was described by Ryan Prado of Paste as "like a carnival train headed off the rails".

Bassist Bruce Thomas said of his part, "When I analyzed it, it was actually a hybrid of a riff from the Everly Brothers song called "The Price of Love". But with the notes changed to those of a Richard Hell and the Voidoids track called "You Gotta Lose". And then there's an odd bar where I played "You Really Got Me". It's what I call organic sampling."

== Release ==
In addition to its release on This Year's Model, "Pump It Up" was released as the second single from the album, after "(I Don't Want to Go to) Chelsea". The song reached number 24 in the UK as well as number 55 in Australia. It has since become a live favorite, often performed as Costello's opening song.

Since its release, "Pump It Up" has appeared on several compilation albums, including The Best of Elvis Costello and the Attractions, Girls Girls Girls, The Very Best of Elvis Costello and The Attractions 1977–86, The Very Best of Elvis Costello, and The Best of Elvis Costello: The First 10 Years. The song also appeared on live albums Live at Hollywood High and Live at the El Mocambo. Additionally, because of the song's regular presence at sporting events, the song has appeared on multi-artist compilation albums such as Jock Rock 2000 and ESPN Presents Slam Jam Volume 1. Costello joked of the song's association with sports, "I'm not a big ice hockey fan myself but would YOU tell them to stop playing it while they have those big sticks in their hands?"

=== "Big Tears" ===
The B-side of the single was the non-album track "Big Tears". Mick Jones of the Clash performs guitar on the song; he was also asked to perform on "Pump It Up" as well, but rumors of Costello attempting to "poach" Jones to be a guitarist for the Attractions prevented him from doing so. Since its appearance on the "Pump It Up" single, "Big Tears" has appeared on the American compilation Taking Liberties, and the UK compilation 10 Bloody Marys & Ten How's Your Fathers.

== Music video ==
The music video for "Pump It Up" was directed by Paul Flattery for Jon Roseman Productions. Costello recalled the video as "cheaply produced" and noted the director's use of a fisheye lens that made him look "bug-eyed". Portions of the video feature Costello walking on his ankles.

The director quickly found out that I could walk on the sides of my ankles. That was a trick that I'd learned not in vaudeville school but at the hands of a vaguely sadistic doctor. When it was determined that I had flat feet as a child, I was first told I would never make it in the army, then I was taught to pick up a ball of socks with my feet like a monkey and do that trick with my ankles in an attempt to strengthen my arches. ... My bizarre attempts at rug-cutting in the "Pump It Up" video were becoming as much a calling card as a comedian's catchphrase, and I could sense myself being vacuumed up into the dust bag of light entertainment.

The video for "(I Don't Want to Go to) Chelsea" was shot the same day in London, and all the musicians can be seen wearing the same clothes, although drummer Pete Thomas sports a plain grey jacket for "Pump It Up". Bassist Bruce Thomas had cut his right hand on a bottle a few weeks before the shoot and had needed eight stitches; his bandage is clearly visible in both videos.

== Reception ==
Since its release, "Pump It Up" has seen positive reception from critics. AllMusic's Deming calls the song "as exciting, insistent, and physically powerful as anything Costello might have been railing against" and noted that the track "perfectly captures the giddy but terrifying feeling of a wild, adrenaline-fueled all-night party that's dangling on the verge of collapse". Amy Poulter of The Virginian Pilot writes, "Even if you're not a fan, you've most likely heard the song and gotten caught up in its infectiously-peppy rhythm and melody". Matt LeMay of Pitchfork praised Pete Thomas' drumming on the song as "nothing short of perfect", while Jeremy Allen of the Guardian described the song as a "classic". Bob Dylan has called the song "...intense and as well groomed as can be. With tender hooks and dirty looks." but then goes on to say that it has "Too many thoughts, way too wordy. Too many ideas that just hang up against themselves."

"Pump It Up" has also been named one of Costello's best songs on several rankings. Jim Beviglia of American Songwriter named it Costello's 20th best song, calling it "a true tour de force for bassist Bruce Thomas" and stating, "When Thomas joins up with Costello on guitar and Steve Nieve on organ for that thundering riff, it's one of those great rock moments, the power of which you can never properly explain to someone without saying, 'Here, listen to this'". Ryan Prado of Paste named it Costello's 12th best, writing, "Easily Costello’s most recognizable song, 'Pump It Up' is one of the few he's written whose core lovability can be boiled down to the fact that it's just a great, peppy punk dance rocker. ... You can't not want to pump something up after listening to this song". In a list for Louder, David Ford named the song one of Costello's top ten best, calling it "a glorious piece of sweaty pop' and "a brilliantly constructed record". Martin Chilton of the Daily Telegraph named it Costello's 30th best.

== Personnel ==
Credits sourced from Mix and AustralianMusician (Note: Mix states that Nieve used a Farfisa organ, but Nieve would state in an interview with AustralianMusician that he never used a Farfisa, but rather a Vox organ.)

- Elvis Costello - lead and backing vocals, electric guitar
- Steve Nieve - Vox Super Continental organ, piano
- Bruce Thomas - bass guitar
- Pete Thomas - drums

== Cover versions ==
"Pump It Up" has been covered by Mudhoney whose rendition was described by Deming as "manag[ing] to actually build on Costello's surliness, though their rendition had a purposefully woozy quality that suggested the hangover had already started to set in."

The song's drum beat inspired the Knack's 1979 hit "My Sharona", according to Knack guitarist Berton Averre.

Electronic band Rogue Traders used the track's riff on their 2005 song "Voodoo Child".

Olivia Rodrigo's 2021 song "Brutal" features a guitar riff similar to that of "Pump It Up", leading to accusations of plagiarism. In response, Costello—who cited Bob Dylan's "Subterranean Homesick Blues" as inspiration for "Pump It Up"—commented, "This is fine by me ... It's how rock and roll works. You take the broken pieces of another thrill and make a brand new toy. That's what I did."

== Certifications ==
Certifications for "Pump It Up"
Region	Certification	Certified units/sales
United Kingdom (BPI)	Silver	200,000^{‡}
^{‡} Sales+streaming figures based on certification alone.
