= Lipstick Vogue =

Song by Elvis Costello & the Attractions

from the album This Year's Model
- Released: 17 March 1978
- Recorded: Eden Studios, London
- Length: 3:42
- Songwriter(s): Elvis Costello
- Producer(s): Nick Lowe

"Lipstick Vogue" is a song by Elvis Costello. It was recorded by him with the Attractions as the penultimate track of his 1978 album This Year's Model. In his album notes for Girls Girls Girls Costello recalled that the song was inspired by "the rhythms of the Metropolitan line (on which it was written) colliding with a song by The Byrds called 'I See You'. I didn't mention this bit to Pete Thomas at the time, so what you hear is all his own work". Allmusic reviewer Tom Maginnis wrote that it "serves as a showcase for the new group's extraordinary energy and impressive skill, while Costello plays the role of the scornful cynic, spitting bitter words of one who has suffered third-degree burns at the hands of love".

Modern Drummer noted the, "killer intro here, a frenzied snare-and-tom combination that slides neatly into tightly coiled double time. That intro pattern returns between verses slightly faster, before a spooky breakdown gives way to a twelve-bar Thomas solo that sounds like a punk drummer interpreting "Sing, Sing, Sing"."

The song also appears on the album Live at the El Mocambo.
