= Live at the El Mocambo (Elvis Costello album) =

Live album by Elvis Costello and The Attractions
- Released: 12 October 1993 / 29 September 2009
- Recorded: 6 March 1978
- Venues: The El Mocambo, Toronto, Ontario, Canada
- Genres: Punk rock, new wave
- Length: 48:59
- Labels: Demon/Rykodisc (1993); Hip-O Select (2009)

Elvis Costello and The Attractions chronology
2½ Years (1993)	Live at the El Mocambo (1993)	Brutal Youth (1994)

Professional ratings
Review scores
Source	Rating
AllMusic	3.5/5 stars
Pitchfork	8.4/10
Record Collector	4/5 stars
Uncut	1.5/5 stars

Live at the El Mocambo is a 1993 live album by Elvis Costello and the Attractions. Recorded on March 6, 1978, from a live radio broadcast by CHUM-FM in Toronto. A tape of the broadcast was obtained by the Canadian division of CBS records and released as an exclusive Canadian promotional album in the same year. As the show's fame began to grow, it became heavily bootlegged.

It was first legally made available with the release (as Live at El Mocambo) either as disc 4 of the 2½ Years 4CD box set or to US purchasers of the first three CDs, in exchange for tokens included in the CD packaging, directly from Rykodisc. The concert was reissued, as a mainstream release, on 29 September 2009 by Hip-O Records, with the same content of the 1978 promotional album.

== Track listing ==
All tracks are written by Elvis Costello.

No.	Title	Length
1.	"Mystery Dance"	2:19
2.	"Waiting for the End of the World"	3:52
3.	"Welcome to the Working Week"	1:19
4.	"Less Than Zero" (Dallas version)	4:08
5.	"The Beat"	3:33
6.	"Lip Service"	2:26
7.	"(I Don't Want to Go to) Chelsea"	3:56
8.	"Little Triggers"	2:47
9.	"Radio Radio"	2:33
10.	"Lipstick Vogue"	4:46
11.	"Watching the Detectives"	5:48
12.	"Miracle Man/Band Introduction"	4:07
13.	"You Belong to Me"	2:32
14.	"Pump It Up"	4:42
Total length:		48:59

"Less Than Zero" (Dallas version) was not recorded in Dallas, the title indicates that this version of the song has lyrics which were rewritten to refer to Lee Harvey Oswald and the Assassination of John F. Kennedy in Dallas, rather than British political figure Oswald Mosley.

== Personnel ==
- Elvis Costello – guitar, vocals

The Attractions

- Steve Nieve – keyboards
- Bruce Thomas – bass
- Pete Thomas – drums

with:

- Martin Belmont – guitar on "Pump It Up"
