= Watching the Detectives (song) =

Single by Elvis Costello
- Released: 21 October 1977
- Genre: New wave; reggae rock
- Length: 3:45
- Label: Stiff (UK)/Columbia (US)
- Songwriter: Elvis Costello
- Producer: Nick Lowe

Elvis Costello singles chronology
"(The Angels Wanna Wear My) Red Shoes" (1977)	"Watching the Detectives" (1977)	"(I Don't Want to Go to) Chelsea" (1978)

Music video
- "Watching the Detectives" on YouTube

"Watching the Detectives" is a 1977 single by English singer-songwriter Elvis Costello. Inspired by the Clash and Bernard Herrmann, the song features a reggae beat and cynical lyrics.

Costello's fourth single overall, "Watching the Detectives" was his first hit single on any national chart, peaking at number 15 in the UK and also charting modestly in Canada and Australia. The song featured on Rolling Stone's 500 Greatest Songs of All Time at number 363.

== Background and recording ==
Costello wrote the song while in the suburbs of London before he became a professional musician. He had listened to the Clash's first album, which he initially thought sounded "terrible", but changed his opinion upon listening to it again. "By the end, I stayed up all night listening to it on headphones, and I thought it was great. Then I wrote 'Watching the Detectives'".

The song, produced by Nick Lowe, was recorded in May 1977. Steve Goulding and Andrew Bodnar played drums and bass guitar on the recording respectively and both were from Graham Parker's band, The Rumour. Keyboard overdubs were added later by Steve Nason (later known as Steve Nieve), who was 19 years-old at the time of the recording session. Costello suggested a piano arrangement that resembled the work of Bernard Herrmann, although Nieve was unfamiliar with his playing. The end result was what Costello described as a "galloping piano thing that rushes the beat" that still echoed the "sudden jarring gestures that Hermann would use a lot."

Costello considers "Watching the Detectives" his favourite song from the first five years of his career. He later performed the song with a big band arrangement, which he admitted was "a desecration to people who love the tenseness of the original recording", but explained that "the story that's going on, and the musical allusions in the original arrangements, relate very much to the realization of this song as an orchestral piece using the film music feeling and the swing rhythms of '50s detective shows."

== Release and reception ==
"Watching the Detectives" was the first top 40 hit in the UK Singles Chart for Costello, reaching number 15 and spending a total of eleven weeks in the chart. It also charted in several other countries including Australia, where it reached number 35, and Canada, where it reached number 60. In the United States it reached number 108 on the Hot 100.

The UK and US singles (released in October and November 1977 respectively) had different B-sides. The UK single was backed by live recordings of "Blame It On Caine" and "Mystery Dance". The US single is backed by "Alison", the lead track from Costello's second UK single.

In its review of the song, Cash Box said that it had "a subtle reggae beat and a sinister James Bond/Secret Agent guitar." Rolling Stone called the song "a clever but furious burst of cynicism" that was a "indisputably classic". Allmusic's Mark Deming described the song as "a skeletal minor-key melody that slowly but effectively wound itself into a solid knot of fierce emotional tension, pushing the bitter lyrical atmosphere further into the darkness".

== Inclusion on albums ==
The song was not included on the original UK releases of either My Aim Is True, which preceded it, or This Year's Model, which followed in March 1978. It was, however, added to the US release of My Aim Is True (March 1978) and to the Scandinavian release of This Year's Model the same year. Two live versions of "Watching the Detectives" from 1978 were released, one from 6 March on the Canadian promotional album Live at the El Mocambo, and another from 4 June on the Live at Hollywood High EP, which came with initial copies of the Armed Forces album (January 1979).

A later live version was included in the Costello & Nieve box-set in 1996. A live medley of "Watching the Detectives" and "My Funny Valentine" recorded in Tokyo was included on the Cruel Smile album by Elvis Costello & the Impostors in 2002. The studio version was also included on several compilations of Costello's work, including Ten Bloody Marys & Ten How's Your Fathers (1980, Stiff), The Best of Elvis Costello – The Man (1985, Telstar), Girls Girls Girls (1989, Demon), The Very Best of Elvis Costello and the Attractions (1994, Demon), and The Very Best of Elvis Costello (1999, Universal TV). It was also included on the Argentinian print of This Year's Model in 1978.

== Track listing ==
=== UK Stiff Records release ===
- Release date: October 1977
- Catalogue No.: BUY20
1. "Watching the Detectives"
2. "Blame it on Cain (live)"
3. "Mystery Dance (live)"

=== US Columbia Records release ===
- Release date: November 1977
- Catalogue No.: 3-10705
1. "Watching the Detectives"
2. "Alison"

== Personnel ==
- Elvis Costello – vocals, guitar
- Andrew Bodnar – bass
- Steve Goulding – drums
- Steve Nieve – piano, organ

== Chart performance ==
Chart (1977–1978)	Peak position
Canada Top Singles (RPM)	60
Sweden (Sverigetopplistan)	9
UK Singles (Official Charts)	15
US Billboard Bubbling Under Hot 100	108

== Cover versions and legacy ==
Jazz singer Jenna Mammina covered the song on her debut album Under the Influence in 1999. Toto covered the song on Through the Looking Glass in 2002. The Henry Girls covered the song on their album December Moon in 2011. Duran Duran covered the song on their 1995 album Thank You.

The reggae beat of "Watching the Detectives" provided Swedish pop band Gyllene Tider with inspiration for the composition of their debut single "Flickorna på TV2" ("The Girls on Channel Two") in 1979, which reached number one on the Swedish singles chart in February 1980, launching the career of the band and vocalist Per Gessle.
