= (I Don't Want to Go to) Chelsea =

Single by Elvis Costello and the Attractions

from the album This Year's Model
- B-side: "You Belong to Me"
- Released: 3 March 1978
- Genre: New wave; garage rock; dub-punk; reggae
- Length: 3:06
- Label: Radar
- Songwriter: Elvis Costello
- Producer: Nick Lowe

Elvis Costello singles chronology
"Watching the Detectives" (1977)	"(I Don't Want to Go to) Chelsea" (1978)	"Pump It Up" (1978)

Official video
- "(I Don't Want to Go to) Chelsea" on YouTube

"(I Don't Want to Go to) Chelsea" is a song written by new wave musician Elvis Costello and recorded by Costello with his backing band the Attractions. The song appeared on Costello's 1978 second album, This Year's Model. Written by Costello while working as a computer programmer, the song was lyrically inspired by films Costello had been watching as well as childhood trips to Chelsea. Musically the song featured influence from bands such as the Who and the Kinks and is notable for Bruce Thomas's prominent bassline.

"Chelsea" was released as the debut single from This Year's Model, reaching number 16 in the UK and charting in other countries. The release was accompanied by a music video. The song has since received positive reception from critics and remains a staple of Costello's live set.

== Background and lyrics ==
"(I Don't Want to Go to) Chelsea" was written by Costello in the mid-1970s while working as a computer programmer. Costello recalled the night he wrote the song:

Early one morning, I snuck my guitar into the office, as I knew I'd be working late into the night. Once everyone else had gone home and I was alone in the otherwise darkened building, with just the hum and chatter of the computer terminal and the far-off light of a coffee machine next to the stairwell where murderers lurked, I wrote '(I Don't Want to Go to) Chelsea'.

Lyrically, the song was influenced partially by "a late run of '60s films set in London on the BBC" that Costello had been watching at the time. Costello was also inspired by trips he had taken with his father to Chelsea in his youth; Costello explained, "I'd gone with my Dad to a few of the more enduring clothing haunts of Chelsea on a rare outing together. ... Now Chelsea seemed even more of an unattainable neighborhood. It stood for both the groovy past and was reported in the papers as the hot-bed of the new punk ferment".

The song was recorded quickly; bassist Bruce Thomas recalled, "We literally did the best tracks on [This Year's Model]—"Pump It Up", "Chelsea"—in one afternoon. It was like Motown. We'd just go in, play them, and that was it". Bruce Thomas credited John Entwistle's bassline on "My Generation" as an inspiration for his performance.

== Music ==
"(I Don't Want to Go to) Chelsea" was based on what Costello described as a "stop-start chord sequence borrowed from the Who" combined with a "clickerty-clackerty guitar figure off an old Rocksteady record by the Pioneers". In his album notes for Girls Girls Girls, Costello wrote that the song "[m]ight have been just a poor relation to 'All Day and All of the Night', 'I Can't Explain' or even 'Clash City Rockers' had it not been for Bruce Thomas' great bassline. Meanwhile I was trying to fit in this lick from an old Pioneers record, though which one I can't recall." Costello later commented on the song's combination of influences, "[It] has effectively three hooks [Costello's guitar, Bruce Thomas's bass, and Thomas's drums] and you would have struggled to pinpoint where the ideas had originated".

Pete Thomas said of his drum part on the song, "The precedent of some fancy drumming had been set. 'Watching the Detectives' had that drum intro. 'Chelsea' is me saying, 'If Elvis Costello is going to have fancy drum intros, I'm doing one'. It was one of the first few takes. If you really listen to it, I'm trying out stuff all the way through". Costello later claimed that Thomas had lifted the drum intro from Mitch Mitchell's performance on the Jimi Hendrix Experience's song "Fire". Organist Steve Nieve uses a deliberately out of tune Vox Continental organ on the song; Costello described the keyboard sound as "thin" and "evil". Costello cited the song as an example of This Year's Model's "spiky and sour" sound, which was created through "a solitary box of tricks to delay and detune" the instruments.

== Release and reception ==
"(I Don't Want to Go to) Chelsea" was released as the debut single from Costello's second album This Year's Model on 3 March 1978. The B-side was "You Belong to Me", another song from This Year's Model. The single was Costello's second chart hit in the UK, peaking at number 16 on the UK Singles Chart over a chart stay of ten weeks. The single reached number 12 in Ireland and number 93 in Australia. The song received glowing critical attention at the time, with the NME concluding, "The single's so good, the very act of releasing it amounts to bragging on a colossal scale". The song was released on This Year's Model on 17 March 1978, though it was omitted on US versions of the album for being too British.

Since its release, "Chelsea" has been praised by music critics. AllMusic's Stephen Thomas Erlewine praised the song for being "underscored with sexual menace", while the same site's Tom Maginnis called it a "brilliant ska-inflected rocker". Kit Rachlis of Rolling Stone praised Costello for the "precision" with which he described Chelsea, while Morgan Troper of PopMatters said, "It's almost not worth listening to Model unless it's a version that contains 'Chelsea', as the song's presence is essential to This Year's Model's overall impact". Dave Lifton of Ultimate Classic Rock named the song as the 7th best Elvis Costello song, proclaiming it the "standout" from This Year's Model and calling it "a perfect example of the mixture of chaos and skill [the Attractions] brought". Martin Chilton of the Daily Telegraph named the song Costello's 15th best.

Costello has since performed the song frequently, including at his set for Woodstock '99. A live version of the song, described as "excellent" by Maginnis, appeared on the album Live at the El Mocambo.

== Video ==
The video shows the band performing in an unfurnished, light-drenched, wholly white set, and uses a simple shrinking square zoom effect. After a photo-montage effect with still photographs of Costello, the video opens with him playing the opening guitar riff in close-up. The video then alternates between the band playing together and shots of Costello singing in an increasingly contorted pose.

The video, directed by Paul Flattery, employs the same set as the video for "Pump It Up" and all the musicians can be seen wearing the same clothes. Bassist Bruce Thomas had injured his hand a few weeks previously and can be seen wearing a bandage mitt.

== Personnel ==
- Elvis Costello – electric guitar, vocals
- Steve Nieve – piano, Vox Continental organ
- Bruce Thomas – bass guitar
- Pete Thomas – drums

== Charts ==
Chart (1978)	Peak position
Australia (Go-Set)	93
Ireland (IRMA)	12
UK Singles (Official Charts)	16
