= Welcome to the Working Week =

1977 song performed by Elvis Costello

Single by Elvis Costello

from the album My Aim Is True
- A-side: "Alison"
- Released: 21 May 1977
- Recorded: 1977
- Length: 1:22
- Label: Stiff (UK); Columbia (US)
- Songwriter(s): Elvis Costello
- Producer(s): Nick Lowe

Elvis Costello singles chronology
"Less Than Zero" (1977)	"Alison" / "Welcome to the Working Week" (1977)	"(The Angels Wanna Wear My) Red Shoes" (1977)

"Welcome to the Working Week" is a song written by and first recorded by Elvis Costello in 1977 for his debut album My Aim Is True. A sardonic comment on the working life aimed at a more privileged woman, the song features a brief runtime and unpolished production. Released as the B-side to "Alison", the song has since attracted critical acclaim from music writers.

== Background ==
According to Costello, "Welcome to the Working Week" was one of several songs for My Aim Is True that was written during a span of "two or three weeks" in the summer of 1977. Like the rest of the songs on the album, it was recorded by Costello with the American country rock band Clover. Costello reflected on the members of Clover, "Perhaps they were not quite so sure what was going on in songs like 'Welcome to the Working Week,' ... but they were recorded before we could worry much about it."

In a 1994 interview, Costello noted the song as a more bitter take on life in London than his 1994 song "London's Brilliant Parade", commenting, "'London's Brilliant Parade' is a little bit more ambivalent in its feelings towards London, than, say, 'Welcome to the Working Week,' which is very unforgiving. Maybe, as you get older, you see the two sides of it."

Author James Perone writes that, in the song's lyrics, Costello "seems to be addressing a young woman—possibly a socialite—who is outside of his working-class world." The song's infamous opening lyric "Now that your picture's in the paper being rhythmically admired" was later described as "snide" by Billboard. Musically, the song is notably brief at 1:22 and features "decidedly low-tech production" from Nick Lowe.

== Release ==
In addition to appearing as the opening track on Costello's 1977 album My Aim Is True, "Welcome to the Working Week" was released as the B-side to "Alison", the second single from the album, that same year. The single failed to chart.

The original demo for "Welcome to the Working Week" has been appeared on subsequent Costello releases, including the deluxe edition of My Aim Is True and the 2007 compilation album Rock and Roll Music. For the latter release, AllMusic writer Stephen Thomas Erlewine described the demo's inclusion as "collector bait". A live version appears on the album Live at the El Mocambo.

== Critical reception ==
"Welcome to the Working Week" has seen critical acclaim since its release and has been praised as a great opening song for the My Aim Is True album. Upon its release in 1977, Greil Marcus described it as one of the album's "edgy rockers" and noted it as being "much more accessible" to American listeners than the UK-centric "Less than Zero". High Fidelity wrote, "'Welcome to the Working Week', which opens the album, may carry a scathing contempt for middle-class verities, but it rocks like crazy and even manages to kid Costello's own imminent celebrity."

Retrospective writers have also singled out the song. AllMusic praised it as a "compact pop gem" while Pitchfork stated, "The brief kick in the balls of the opening track, 'Welcome to the Working Week,' is perhaps the album's perfect mission statement." Billboard ranked it as the third best song on the album, calling it "smart-aleck pub-rock with crunchy guitars, clapping drums and Girl Group-style doo-doos and wah-wahs to accompany Costello's barbs about the ol' 9 to 5."
