= (The Angels Wanna Wear My) Red Shoes =

Single by Elvis Costello

from the album My Aim Is True
- B-side: "Mystery Dance"
- Released: 29 July 1977
- Recorded: 1977
- Genre: Power pop; new wave
- Label: Stiff
- Songwriter: Elvis Costello
- Producer: Nick Lowe

Elvis Costello singles chronology
| "Alison" (1977) | "(The Angels Wanna Wear My) Red Shoes" (1977) | "Watching the Detectives" (1977) |

Official audio
- "[The Angels Wanna Wear My] Red Shoes" on YouTube

"(The Angels Wanna Wear My) Red Shoes" is a song written and recorded by Elvis Costello for his 1977 debut album My Aim Is True. Written by Costello on a train ride to Liverpool in 1976, the song features lyrics, according to Costello, about "romantic disappointment". The song features Byrds-inspired music with an intro contributed by John McFee of Costello's then-backing band Clover.

"(The Angels Wanna Wear My) Red Shoes" was released as the third single from My Aim Is True. Despite greater exposure than Costello's past singles, the song failed to chart in the UK. The song received positive reception from critics and remains a staple of Costello's live set.

== Background ==
"(The Angels Wanna Wear My) Red Shoes" was written by Costello on a train travelling from London to Liverpool in 1976. Costello reportedly sketched out the song in the final ten minutes of the trip; he later described this sudden inspiration as "startling". Costello recalled,

I wrote it in 10 minutes on a train out of Liverpool — the whole song in one gulp. ... And then there was the whole comedic thing of getting it down. Nowadays you can demo things on your phone. I had to block it out in my mind. Then I had to get off the train, get to my mother's house, grab an old guitar I had there and play the song until I imprinted it in my memory. I had no tape recorder. I had no way other than repetition to drill it into my head so I wouldn't lose it.

The Wall Street Journal described the song as "a surrealist tale about an imagined jilting and the appearance of earthbound angels offering the singer immortality—in exchange for his footwear". Costello explained, "I had the essential image, then I worked backward — a dancehall scene with the put-down lines. That kind of framed this other, weirder idea of 'I won't get any older' — I went, 'Why am I saying this when I'm 22?'" He later said of the lyrics, "The verses were a pretty standard tale of romantic disappointment. Okay, it had a couple of snappy put-down lines, but they were nothing so out of the ordinary". He speculated that the lyric "Oh, I said, 'I'm so happy I could die' / She said, 'Drop dead' then left with another guy" may have been inspired by a "drunken journey home" in 1973.

The opening to the song was created by Clover guitarist John McFee, a member of Costello's backing band for My Aim Is True. Bass player John Ciambotti of Clover reportedly called the song "that one that sounds like the Byrds".

== Release and reception ==
"(The Angels Wanna Wear My) Red Shoes" was recorded a few months after it was written to appear on Costello's 1977 debut album, My Aim Is True. The song was later released as the third single from the album in July 1977. The B-side of the single was "Mystery Dance", another song from My Aim Is True. Preceding singles "Less Than Zero" and "Alison" were unsuccessful, but the popularity of My Aim Is True gave Costello hope for the single; Costello recalled, "'(The Angels Wanna Wear My) Red Shoes' was my third Stiff Records single to be released. The first two ... had sunk without a trace, but after initially scant sales, all the publicity around the release of My Aim Is True had actually threatened to push 'Red Shoes' into the singles charts". Despite the greater visibility, the single possibly failed to officially chart (Costello did appear on the UK music show 'Top of the Pops' with the newly assembled Attractions performing the song) .

"(The Angels Wanna Wear My) Red Shoes" received positive reception from music critics. Pitchfork praised the song as "the catchiest pop song on My Aim Is True" while Rolling Stone praised the song's "knowing arrogance". Dave Lifton of Ultimate Classic Rock named the song as the 9th best Elvis Costello song, stating, "Rejection doesn't come more pithy than 'I said 'I'm so happy I could die' / She said, 'Drop dead' then left with another guy'". The Daily Telegraph's Martin Chilton named the song Costello's 21st best.

James Honeyman-Scott of the Pretenders cited the song, alongside Nick Lowe's "So It Goes", as one of the inspirations for his jangly guitar sound. He explained, "They had this big, jangly guitar sound, which is what I'd been wanting to get into for a long while. All of a sudden the radio's on and there's this huge guitar sound coming out, like sending out a big Rickenbacker 12-string or something. And I thought, 'Ah, my time is here.' So that's what happened. And then I hooked up with the Pretenders."

In 2011, Costello appeared on Sesame Street to perform a parody of "(The Angels Wanna Wear My) Red Shoes", entitled "(A Monster Went and) Ate My Red 2". As a ravenous Cookie Monster consumes the titular scarlet number, Costello sings with Elmo, who is dressed in Costello's style. The performance was described by Huffington Post as "awesome".

== Live performances ==
"(The Angels Wanna Wear My) Red Shoes" has long been a favorite of Costello's live setlist. Costello performed the song live at solo shows before My Aim Is True was released. Costello performed the song with his new band the Attractions on Top of the Pops, miming to a specifically recorded performance that was "much faster" than the original. Costello notably wore his Musicians' Union card in his breast pocket during the segment.

Costello has since performed the song frequently, including at his set for Woodstock '99.
