= Working week =

Working week may refer to

- Working Week (band), a British jazz-dance band of the 1980s and 1990s
- Working time, the period of time that people spend in paid labour
- Workweek, referred to as the working week in the UK

== See also ==
- "Welcome to the Working Week", a song by Elvis Costello on the 1977 album My Aim Is True
