= Alison (song) =

1977 single by Elvis Costello

Single by Elvis Costello

from the album My Aim Is True
- B-side: "Welcome to the Working Week"
- Released: 21 May 1977
- Recorded: 1977
- Studio: Pathway (London)
- Genre: New wave; pub rock; power pop; pop
- Length: 3:21
- Label: Stiff (UK); Columbia (US)
- Songwriter: Elvis Costello
- Producer: Nick Lowe

Elvis Costello singles chronology
"Less Than Zero" (1977)	"Alison" (1977)	"(The Angels Wanna Wear My) Red Shoes" (1977)

"Alison" is a song written by and first recorded by English musician Elvis Costello in 1977 for his debut album My Aim Is True on Stiff Records. Costello claimed the song was written as an ode to a woman he saw working at a supermarket, though he has remained vague on the meaning. Though Costello's single never charted, it has become one of his most critically acclaimed songs.

Linda Ronstadt, who covered the song and released her version in 1979, had a moderate hit with it.

== Background ==
The song "Alison" was included on Elvis Costello's debut studio album My Aim Is True as the fifth track, and was released in 1977. As "Alison" was recorded before the Attractions formed, his backing band on the track was Clover. Costello has divulged little on the meaning of the song other than to say that it is about "disappointing somebody" and to deny suggestions that the lines "somebody better put out the big light" and "my aim is true" refer to murder. He has also declined to reveal who the song is about, writing in the liner notes for Girls Girls Girls, "Much could be undone by saying more."

However, in his 2015 autobiography Unfaithful Music & Disappearing Ink, Costello wrote: "I've always told people that I wrote the song 'Alison' after seeing a beautiful checkout girl at the local supermarket. She had a face for which a ship might have once been named. Scoundrels might once have fought mist-swathed duels to defend her honour. Now she was punching in the prices on cans of beans at a cash register and looking as if all the hopes and dreams of her youth were draining away. All that were left would soon be squandered to a ruffian who told her convenient lies and trapped her still further".

Costello has also said that the musical idea for the chorus, breaking up the line "I know this world is killing you", in a staccato fashion, derives from the manner that the line "Life ain't so easy when you're a ...", precedes the title refrain, on "Ghetto Child", by The Detroit Spinners. "Alison" is written in the key of E major.

== Reception ==
"Alison" was released as a single in the United Kingdom with a B-side of "Welcome to the Working Week", and as two singles in the United States; one with a mono version of the same song on the B-side, the other with "Miracle Man". The US (and Canadian) single versions of "Alison" are unique in that it is remixed to add a string section. Record World called it "a stirring ballad" and said that "the strings add a dimension the song lacked in its original version and should help send it to the top."

The single did not chart, but the song did get airplay in the U.S. on album-oriented rock radio. In 2004, Rolling Stone ranked it No. 318 on their list of the 500 Greatest Songs of All Time and Entertainment Weekly voted it as one of Costello's top 10 greatest tunes. The Telegraph named it Costello's second greatest song only after "Oliver's Army", calling it "a wonderful song about unrequited love."

== Linda Ronstadt version ==
"Alison"

Single by Linda Ronstadt

from the album Living in the USA
- B-side: "Mohammed's Radio"
- Released: April 1979
- Recorded: 1978
- Studio: The Sound Factory (Hollywood)
- Genre: Country rock, new wave
- Length: 3:20
- Label: Asylum
- Songwriter: Elvis Costello
- Producer: Peter Asher

Linda Ronstadt singles chronology
"Just One Look" (1979)	"Alison" (1979)	"How Do I Make You" (1980)

=== Background ===
American singer Linda Ronstadt recorded a cover version of "Alison" for her studio album Living in the USA, in 1978, which sold over 2 million copies. Released as the disc's fourth single in the spring of 1979 on Asylum Records, it was produced by her longtime producer Peter Asher. Ronstadt's B-side to "Alison" was "Mohammed's Radio", also produced by Asher.

=== Reception ===
Ronstadt's version of "Alison" was a moderate hit, reaching number 30 in the U.S. on the Billboard adult contemporary chart. Her single also reached number 66 in the UK Singles chart. Years later, Costello joked that he might have been publicly derisive of Ronstadt's version, "but I didn't mind spending the money that she earned me". Costello donated royalties from Ronstadt's version to the African National Congress after she played at Sun City in South Africa.
