= Fourty Niner =

Studio album by Clover
- Released: 1971
- Genre: Country rock, rock
- Label: Fantasy
- Producer: Ed Bogas

Clover chronology
Clover (1970)	Fourty Niner (1971)	Unavailable (1977)

Fourty Niner (1971) is the second album by Clover.

== Track listing ==
All tracks composed by Alex Call; except where noted.

1. "Harvest" (Ed Bogas, H. McBotti) – 2:19
2. "Keep On Tryin'" (H. McBotti) – 3:19
3. "Old Man Blues" – 3:36
4. "Forty-Niner" (Alex Call, John Ciambotti) – 2:25
5. "Sound of Thunder" – 2:33
6. "Chicken Butt" (Alex Call, John McFee, John Ciambotti) – 2:24
7. "Mr. Moon" – 2:49
8. "Love Is Gone" – 2:31
9. "Mitch's Tune" (Alex Call, Mitch Howie) – 3:12
10. "Sunny Mexico" – 2:06
11. "If I Had My Way" (Rev. Gary Davis) – 3:07

H. McBotti is a pseudonym for John Ciambotti.

== Personnel ==
=== Clover ===
- Alex Call – lead vocals, guitar, piano
- John McFee – lead guitar, pedal steel guitar, piano, organ, vocals
- John Ciambotti – bass, guiro, vocals
- Mitch Howie – drums

=== Additional personnel ===
- Ed Bogas – fiddle, piano, guitar, marimbas, organ
- Bruce Campbell – banjo
