= Love on the Wire =

Studio album by Clover
- Released: 1977
- Genre: Rock
- Labels: Vertigo, Mercury
- Producer: Robert John "Mutt" Lange

Clover chronology
Unavailable (1977)	Love on the Wire (1977)	The Clover Chronicle (1979)

Love on the Wire (1977) is the fourth album by Clover. It was released on Vertigo Records in the UK. In the United States, it was released on Mercury Records.

William Ruhlmann of AllMusic rated it 3 out of 5 stars, noting that it had a "harder rock edge" than the previous albums.

== Track listing ==
1. "Hearts Under Fire" (Alex Call, Sean Hooper, Clover) – 5:37
2. "Southern Belles" (Alex Call, Hugh Cregg, Sean Hooper, Clover) – 3:24
3. "Oh Señorita" (Alex Call, John McFee, Clover) – 4:24
4. "Still Alive" (Alex Call, Hugh Cregg, Clover) – 3:51
5. "Keep On Rollin" (Jerry Leiber, Mike Stoller) – 2:40
6. "California Kid" (Alex Call, Clover) – 3:40
7. "Easy Love" (Alex Call, Hugh Cregg, John McFee, John Ciambotti, Robert John Lange, Sean Hooper) – 3:56
8. "Ain’t Nobody Own Nobody’s Soul" (Alex Call, Hugh Cregg, Robert John Lange, Clover) – 3:47
9. "From Now On" (Alex Call, John McFee, John Ciambotti, Clover) – 3:37
10. "Travellin’ Man" (Jerry Fuller) – 4:10

== Personnel ==
=== Clover ===
- Alex Call – lead vocals, guitar
- Huey Lewis – lead vocals, harmonica
- John McFee – lead guitar, slide guitar, pedal steel, vocals
- Sean Hopper – keyboards, percussion, vocals
- John Ciambotti – Fender bass, vocals
- Tony Braunagel – drums

=== Technical ===
- Robert John Lange, Ted Sharp - recording engineer
- Bill Price, Robert John Lange - mixing engineer
- Peter Gravelle - photography
