= Sean Hopper =

- Born: March 31, 1953 (age 73); San Francisco, California, U.S.
- Genre: Rock
- Occupation: Instrumentalist
- Instrument: Keyboards
- Member of: Huey Lewis and the News
- Formerly of: Clover
- Website: www.hueylewisandthenews.com

Sean Thomas Hopper is an American musician, playing keyboards. He is a founding member of the American rock band Huey Lewis and the News.

== Biography ==
Sean Hopper was born in San Francisco on March 31, 1953.

Hopper has purportedly played in bands since the eighth grade. Before his time with the News, Hopper was the keyboardist for Clover, with Lewis. 1977 saw a flurry of activity for Hopper; he appeared, playing bass, on Norton Buffalo's album Lovin' in the Valley of the Moon, followed by Twiggy's album Please Get My Name Right. The same year, Hopper backed Elvis Costello as a pianist and organist on Costello's first album, My Aim Is True. In 1978, Hopper appeared on keyboards on Nick Lowe's album Jesus of Cool. Lewis and Hopper formed Huey Lewis and the News, with Johnny Colla, Mario Cipollina, and Bill Gibson of Soundhole, in 1979. The group sold nearly 30 million albums and toured for four decades before disbanding in 2018.

Hopper appeared on Carlene Carter's 1980 album Musical Shapes, playing keyboards. In 1984, he sang backing vocals on Grace Slick's album Software. Playing double bass, he appeared on Password (2000) by Geoff Muldaur. Stephen Bruton's album Spirit World (2002) features Hopper on keyboards.

== Equipment ==
Hopper has used a Roland Jupiter-8, Yamaha DX7, Roland D-50, Roland Juno-60, Hohner Clavinet D6, Vox Continental, and Yamaha CP-80 Electric Grand Piano during his career.

== Discography ==
=== with others ===
- Unavailable (1977) – Clover
- Love on the Wire (1977) – Clover
- Lovin' in the Valley of the Moon (1977) – Norton Buffalo
- Please Get My Name Right (1977) –Twiggy
- My Aim Is True (1977) – Elvis Costello
- Jesus of Cool (1978) – Nick Lowe
- Musical Shapes (1980) – Carlene Carter
- Software (1984) – Grace Slick
- Password (2000) – Geoff Muldaur
- Spirit World (2002) – Stephen Bruton
