= Unavailable (album) =

Studio album by Clover
- Released: March 1977
- Studio: Rockfield Recording Studios, Monmouth, Wales
- Genre: Rock
- Label: Vertigo, Mercury
- Producer: Robert John "Mutt" Lange

Clover chronology
| Fourty Niner (1971) | Unavailable (1977) | Love on the Wire (1977) |

Unavailable (1977) is the third album by Clover. It was released on Vertigo Records in the UK. In the United States and Canada, it was titled Clover and released on Mercury Records.

== Track listing ==
All tracks composed by Alex Call and Clover; except where noted.

1. "Love Love" – 3:55
2. "Take Another Look" (Alex Call, Hugh Cregg, Sean Hooper, Clover) – 3:20
3. "Streets of London" (Alex Call, Michael Schreiner, Clover) – 4:31
4. "I Lie Awake (And Dream of You)" – 4:20
5. "The Storm" (Alex Call, Hugh Cregg, John McFee, Robert Lange, Clover) – 5:57
6. "Child of the Streets" – 3:42
7. "Leavin' Is" – 4:05
8. "Fairweather Fan" (John Ciambotti, Clover) – 3:26
9. "Santa Fe" – 3:21
10. "Show Me Your Love" (Live) – 2:58

== Personnel ==
=== Clover ===
- Alex Call – lead vocals, guitar
- Huey Lewis – lead vocals, harmonica
- John McFee – lead guitar, pedal steel guitar, violin, vocals
- Sean Hopper – keyboards, vocals
- John Ciambotti – Fender bass, vocals
- Micky Shine – drums, percussion, vocals

=== Technical ===
- Pat Moran - engineer
- Dave Robinson, Jake Riviera - executive producer
- Barney Bubbles - design, typography, cover illustration
- Adrian Boot - photography
