= Clover (album) =

Studio album by Clover
- Released: 1970
- Genre: Country rock, rock
- Label: Fantasy
- Producer: Ed Bogas (for debut of California)

Clover chronology
Clover (1970)	Fourty Niner (1971)

Clover (1970) is the first album by Clover.

== Track listing ==
1. "Shotgun" (Junior Walker) - 2:10
2. "Southbound Train" (Alex Call, John McFee) - 3:38
3. "Going to the Country" (Johnny Ciambotti) - 2:29
4. "Monopoly" (Ciambotti) - 2:00
5. "Stealin'" (Call, Ed Bogas) - 4:33
6. "Wade in the Water" (Traditional; arranged by Clover) - 4:31
7. "No Vacancy" (Ciambotti) - 3:09
8. "Lizard Rock N' Roll Band" (Call, Bogas) - 2:57
9. "Come" (Call) - 3:45
10. "Could You Call It Love" (Call, McFee) - 2:39

== Personnel ==
=== Clover ===
- Alex Call – lead vocals, rhythm guitar
- John McFee – lead and steel guitar, vocals
- John Ciambotti – bass, backing vocals
- Mitch Howie – drums

=== Additional Personnel ===
- Ed Bogas – fiddle
