= My Aim Is True =

- Original monochrome cover. Later editions are in colour.

Studio album by Elvis Costello
- Released: 22 July 1977
- Recorded: 1976–1977
- Studio: Pathway (London)
- Genres: New wave; pub rock; punk rock; power pop
- Length: 32:56
- Labels: Stiff; Columbia
- Producer: Nick Lowe

Elvis Costello chronology
My Aim Is True (1977)	This Year's Model (1978)

Singles from My Aim Is True
- 1. "Less Than Zero" Released: 11 March 1977; 2. "Alison" Released: 14 May 1977; 3. "(The Angels Wanna Wear My) Red Shoes" Released: July 1977

My Aim Is True is the debut studio album by the English singer-songwriter Elvis Costello, originally released in the United Kingdom on 22 July 1977 on Stiff Records. Produced by Stiff artist and musician Nick Lowe, the album was recorded from late 1976 to early 1977 over six four-hour studio sessions at Pathway Studios in Islington, London. The backing band was the California-based country rock act Clover, who were uncredited on the original release due to contractual difficulties. At the suggestion of the label, Costello changed his name from D.P. Costello to Elvis after Elvis Presley, and adjusted his image to match the rising punk rock movement.

Musically, My Aim Is True is influenced by various genres, from punk, new wave and British pub rock to elements of 1950s rock and roll, R&B and rockabilly. The more downbeat lyrics are motivated by revenge and guilt, reflecting topics from relationship struggles to politically charged situations and misogynistic characters. The original monochrome cover art, showing Costello in a pigeon-toed stance, was later colourised for reissues.

The album was preceded by three singles, all of which failed to chart. By June 1977, Costello formed a new permanent backing band, the Attractions, to better match his new image and commenced live performances with them for the rest of the year. In August, My Aim Is True reached number 14 in the UK. The American version, released in November 1977 through Columbia Records, added Costello's newest single "Watching the Detectives". By then the biggest-selling import album in U.S. history, it reached number 32.

On release, My Aim Is True was met with critical acclaim, with many praising Costello's musicianship and songwriting; it appeared on several year-end lists. In later decades, commentators consider it one of Costello's finest works, one of the best debut albums in music history and it has appeared on numerous best-of lists. The album was reissued in 1993, 2001 and in 2007 as a deluxe edition. A box set reissue celebrating the album's 49th anniversary was released in October 2026.

== Background ==
Elvis Costello—under his actual name Declan MacManus—began performing in clubs and pubs in Liverpool and London in 1970. Over the years he created some demo tapes, but had little success in obtaining a recording contract. He later told Melody Maker that he "didn't have enough money to do anything with a band". According to the author Graeme Thomson, the British DJ Charlie Gillett played songs from one tape, containing future My Aim Is True songs "Blame It on Cain" and "Mystery Dance", on his show throughout the summer of 1976. The exposure garnered interest from labels, although it was rejected by Island Records, Virgin Records and American-based CBS Records. He was eventually signed to London-based Stiff Records in August 1976 by the label's co-founders Jake Riviera and Dave Robinson. He was the first artist signed to Stiff, but was the label's eleventh release.

== Writing and recording ==
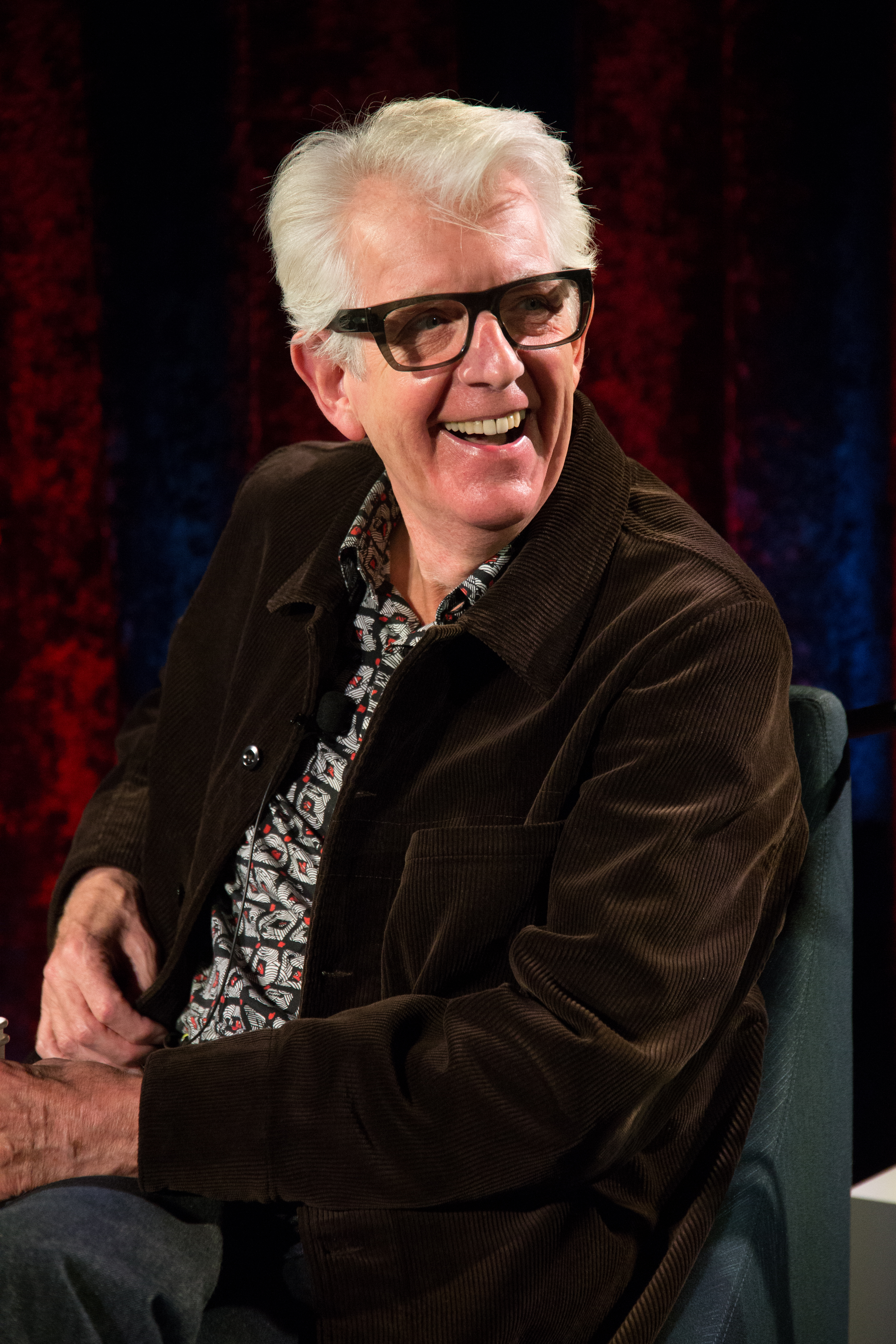
My Aim Is True was the first of five consecutive Costello albums produced by Nick Lowe (pictured in 2017).

Stiff financed recording sessions for an album at Pathway Studios, an eight-track studio located in Islington, with members of the American country rock act Clover as the backing band. The band had moved to Britain after gaining a cult following there and signed to Phonogram Records. Clover's most famous members, singers Huey Lewis and Alex Call, did not participate in the recording sessions in any capacity, while the members who played on My Aim Is True — John McFee (guitar), John Ciambotti (bass), Sean Hopper (keyboards) and Mickey Shine (drums) — were not credited on the final album at the time due to contractual difficulties. (Some early marketing for the album identified Costello's backing band as "The Shamrocks", without naming any individual members.) Costello said Clover arrived in London during the punk revolution and due to appearing as "American hippies", they "just didn't fit in". The band resided at the country house Headley Grange during the period.

My Aim Is True was recorded in a series of six four-hour sessions, from late 1976 to early 1977 for about £2,000. Costello kept his day job as a data entry clerk at Elizabeth Arden during the sessions; he would call in sick, travel to Headley Grange to rehearse the songs with Clover and head back to Pathway the next day to record. Costello recalled disliking the time at Headley Grange and that he and Clover had musical disagreements, but nevertheless praised their musicianship. According to Thomson, Clover were paid little for their contributions. Most of the tracks were recorded live and in first takes with little overdubbing. While Clover provided most of the instrumentation, Stan Shaw of the Hitmen played keyboards on "Less Than Zero" while Lowe produced and sang backing vocals. (Note: Clover's lead singer Alex Call and harmonica player Huey Lewis, who later found fame with the News, were absent from the sessions. Lewis later explained: "I took a vacation. I could have sung a bit or played a bit of harmonica, but we'd been on the road since 1970.") Regarding his guitar work, Costello stated in his memoir that at the time, he did not own his signature Jazzmaster guitar so he used a "shrill" Telecaster on the album. He also lacked substantial knowledge on guitars themselves, saying that he played his guitar unadjusted until halfway through the sessions.

The majority of the songs on My Aim Is True were written in about two weeks. Most of them came from Costello's earlier demo tapes and live performances with his former band Flip City. Some tracks would appear on later albums, such as "Hand In Hand", which was written specifically for Lowe, who rejected it. More adventurous numbers such as "Hoover Factory", "Dr. Luther's Assistant", "Ghost Train" and "Stranger in the House" were also recorded during the sessions, but were omitted from My Aim Is True and instead appeared on EPs and singles. According to the biographer Brian Hinton, these tracks would have contrasted with Costello's aspiring image of a "straight talking psychopath". In the liner notes for the 1993 reissue of My Aim Is True, Costello stated that the three main outtakes from the sessions were "Radio Sweetheart", "Stranger in the House" and "Living in Paradise", the first two being left off the final track list due to differences in sound and the last being properly recorded for Costello's follow-up album This Year's Model (1978).

Fellow Stiff artist and house producer Nick Lowe produced the album. Regarding his role as producer, Thomson states that Lowe's priority was to keep the feel of the songs and create appropriate atmospheres for each. Lowe himself later stated that the musicians did all the work and all he contributed was "switch[ing] everything on". He rough-mixed the tracks with engineer Barry "Bazza" Farmer, the final mix completed in a single five-hour session at Pathway on 27 January 1977.

=== Name change ===
At the time, Costello was performing under the stage name "D.P. Costello" as a tribute to his father. (Note: The P in "D.P." comes from his middle name, Patrick; Costello comes from his great-grandmother.) With "Less Than Zero" being readied for release as a single in March 1977, Robinson and Riviera decided to adjust his image to better match the rising punk rock movement. Looking like, in Clayton-Lea's words, an "average ordinary-looking computer operator geek", he lacked "neither aggression nor energy" in his live performances, as musician Graham Parker told Mojo.

As a marketing tactic, Riviera suggested changing Costello's name from Declan to Elvis after American singer Elvis Presley. Considered irrational but accepted by Costello himself, the change sparked controversy in both Britain and America, facing opposition from both Costello's supporters and Presley's fans. Costello later stated that the change was not meant to "insult" Presley; it "meant people would pause just that little bit longer". Wardrobe-wise, Costello became more exaggerated, donning Buddy Holly-style glasses, tight jackets and "turned-up" jeans. He made his live solo debut under the new name and look on 27 May 1977.

== Music and lyrics ==
On My Aim Is True, Elvis' raw energy comes through in a way that's never completely recaptured on later records. While the songs range from mellow country twang to full-on, spitting assault, there's a strange cohesiveness to the album simply by virtue of its rough, rushed feel.

— Matt LeMay, Pitchfork, 2002

According to the biographer Tony Clayton-Lea, Costello and Lowe aimed to create "a collection of songs that were not only of their time, but which were also rooted in classic songwriting values". As such, commentators have written that the album combines various musical genres, including new wave, British pub rock, punk rock, and power pop. William Goodman of Billboard magazine called it "rough edged and bluesy" in a style reminiscent of New Orleans, and recognised the presence of punk, rockabilly, UK pub rock, jazz and honky-tonk country. Consequence of Sound's Nick Freed wrote that the album combines elements of the British punk movement with 1950s and 1960s-style rock and roll. He found tracks like "Miracle Man", "No Dancing" and "Alison" utilise that style to create doo-wop and R&B melodies, thereby "taking the '50s and '60s ideas and adding the modern spin". The rockabilly sound is present on "Less Than Zero", "Mystery Dance" and "Sneaky Feelings". Clayton-Lea states that while it shared similarities with punk, it displayed musicianship and lyricism that were in control, showcasing a softer touch while underlined with a "unique savagery".

While the music presents a wide range of styles, the lyrics are mostly downbeat, discussing topics such as "deceit, sarcasm, bitterness, disdain, scorn [and] disgust". In an interview with Nick Kent of the NME, Costello stated that the songs are motivated solely by "revenge and guilt". The biographer David Gouldstone writes that the album's primary theme is "the unaccommodating nature of the world", which is explored in two distinct ways: "the personal songs as the microcosm, and the public as the macrocosm". The lyrics range from complex and surreal ("Waiting for the End of the World") to unsympathetic ("Less Than Zero") and misogynistic ("I'm Not Angry"). Dave Schulps of Trouser Press described the album as "12 songs of revenge, guilt, jealousy, humiliation and rage". Goodman found the lyrics and production matches a bedroom performance, a sentiment echoed by LeMay, who similarly stated that Lowe's production has a "latent energy" that grants the album "all the immediacy of a live show". The painter and art critic Julian Bell wrote that Costello's work "relies heavily on being between emotions, between sensations, ideas [and] informations." Regarding Costello's vocal performance on the record, Gouldstone writes that his directness contributes to listeners' constant interest: "he continually grabs us by the shirtfront and harangues us, and we are sucked into the vortex."

=== Side one ===
The opening track, "Welcome to the Working Week", expresses frustration at the ruthlessness of business. The lyrics are directed at "you", which Gouldstone analyses as the song's female character, the listener or the world itself. With a runtime of only 82 seconds, the song contains a punk-style beat and handclaps and utilises elements of doo-wop and new wave. Compared to the previous track, "Miracle Man" deals with the relationship between a man and a woman rather than society. Like the next track "No Dancing", "Miracle Man" concerns a man dominated by his female companion.

"No Dancing" contains a Phil Spector-type beat and various key changes, which was a rarity in Costello's early work. Costello stated that he was attempting to merge a "Merseybeat bridge" into "He's a Rebel" by Gene Pitney. Unlike other tracks on the album, the song's narrator is primarily observant, only directly appearing in the first verse. Commentators have analysed "dancing" on the record as a metaphor for sex, while Gouldstone goes further and writes that Costello is implying a lack of world order and harmony. Returning to the lyrical themes of the opening track is "Blame It on Cain", although Costello is more specific in this track, targeting entities such as "government burglars" and the radio. According to Gouldstone, the "it" in the chorus is not explicitly stated, only that it must be blamed on Cain. Taking the name Cain from the first murderer in the Bible, he analyses the track as fundamental frustrations that cannot be pinned on anyone and thus cannot be fixed, concluding that nothing wrong will become right. This growing tension is reflected in the music, which has an increased number of bars in each verse. Musically, the song was described by one reviewer as upbeat blues with a "Jersey Shore rock shine".

Described by Goodman as the album's "spiritual centrepiece", "Alison" is a ballad that combines jazzy guitars with soulful vocals. It was written about a checkout girl at a local supermarket. Unlike other tracks on the album, "Alison" is more upbeat in tone and contains more caring and tender lyrics rather than feelings of maliciousness and anger; these feelings are present, but are muted compared to the preceding tracks. In the track, the narrator longs for the title character, who has married an inferior man even though he knows she is making a mistake. The album takes its title from a line in the song. "Sneaky Feelings" marks a return to upbeat blues and standard pop. Much lighter in tone, the song concerns unfaithfulness. Gouldstone states that the 'sneaky feelings' are our desires for the unfeasible: "feelings which will only cause suffering and so must be suppressed."

=== Side two ===
Hinton calls "(The Angels Wanna Wear My) Red Shoes" a "harder take" on "Alison". Gouldstone describes the characters' relationship in the song as "fractured" and "punctured". The woman is, like other tracks, portrayed as a heartless prosecutor of men but also a victim of them. He also identifies it as a rare example of Costello's that is sympathetic towards women. The red shoes are an allegory for an individual's freedoms and as such, metaphorical forces (referred to as 'angels') want to take away the narrator's freedom. (Note: Other symbolic uses of "red shoes" in music include David Bowie's "Let's Dance" (1983) and Carl Perkins' "Blue Suede Shoes" (1956).) The song also deals with the passage of time, which several subsequent tracks revisit. The most overtly political song on the album, "Less Than Zero" is a steady rocker that concerns the 1920s British Union of Fascists leader Oswald Mosley. Costello accuses him of various crimes, such as brutality and possibly rape and incest, after Mosley denied any wrongdoings on television in the mid-1970s. The song's chorus suggests the media suppresses knowledge of government corruption, thereby invoking censorship. Oswald Mosley is an obscure figure outside the UK, and the song only refers to the character of "Mr. Oswald" (the name Mosley is never mentioned); listeners in the United States assumed that "Mr. Oswald" was Lee Harvey Oswald, the assassin of president John F. Kennedy. Consequently, Costello wrote an alternative lyric to refer to the assassin. This alternative lyric (called the "Dallas Version") was performed when playing the song live in North America.

"Mystery Dance" is a 1950s-style rocker that uses dancing as a metaphor for sex, but unlike "No Dancing", concerns a couple's first experience with it; as such, the narrator is confused by it. Writing for AllMusic, Tom Maginnis considered the track reminiscent of the "sock-hop rock" of Buddy Holly. "Pay It Back" affirms the implication that the media lies to the public. In the song, the narrator finds out not everything in life is guaranteed and feels betrayed. Hinton describes it as "deeply cynical". Meanwhile, misogyny is prevalent on "I'm Not Angry", where sex is portrayed as demeaning rather than joyful. The ideal is acknowledged through the spite in Costello's vocal performance, while the music has been likened to hard rock. "Waiting for the End of the World" depicts a surrealistic narrative that takes place on a train, which Gouldstone analyses as a symbol for life. Furthermore, Costello suggests God created the universe but allowed it to be manipulated through individuals that seize power.

== Packaging and artwork ==
The album cover was designed by Barney Bubbles who, like Clover, was uncredited on the sleeve. It depicts a checkerboard pattern (surrounding the photo of Costello) on which the phrase "Elvis Is King" is written, which Hinton states was intended as a parody of Bridget Riley's Swinging Sixties op art paintings. In the centre, Costello dons his new look and stands in a stiff, pigeon-toed pose clutching a Fender guitar with his large shadow behind him. The author Mick St. Michael commented: "This fellow looked like he'd find it hard to aim a paper aeroplane." According to Costello, the final shot was one of the only usable images due to the comical nature during the photo session. He struck a similar pose in the photo on the back of the original sleeve, where he appeared in monochrome against a coloured background while his head appeared disproportionately large. Gouldstone compares his look to "a demented version" of Brains from the 1960s British science fiction series Thunderbirds, actor Woody Allen and Piggy from Lord of the Flies (1954).

Initially, the cover art was in black-and-white on the front and came in four different colours; later reissues added seven additional variants. The first pressings of the record included a flyer that read "Help Us Hype Elvis", which asked buyers to send in a 25-word description of "why they liked the 'English' Elvis". According to Hinton, the first 1,000 purchasers earned them a free copy of the LP to be sent to a friend of their choice. The idea originated from Warner Bros. Records' attempts to gain American musician Van Dyke Parks a larger audience.

== Release and aftermath ==
=== Singles ===
Stiff issued "Less Than Zero" as a single on 11 March 1977, backed by the outtake "Radio Sweetheart". (Note: Thomson lists the date as 25 March 1977.) Despite receiving critical praise, the single failed to reach the UK charts. "Alison" followed on 14 May, backed by "Welcome to the Working Week", which also did not chart. In early July, Stiff released "(The Angels Wanna Wear My) Red Shoes" as a single, backed by "Mystery Dance"; it lacked a picture sleeve and failed to chart. Regarding the poor commercial performances, Costello recalled: "I remember it being very demoralising, feeling that my only contact with the world was those singles, and those people who I didn't know or I'd never met had to make or break of it…that was very depressing." Nevertheless, he continued to garner attention from music journalists, including Melody Maker's Allan Jones and the NME's Nick Kent, who gave positive assessments to live shows in May and June. Costello also refused to give biographical details in interviews, even telling Sounds magazine's John Ingham he did not want to be photographed. Costello left his day job at Elizabeth Arden on 5 July.

Initially intended for release shortly after the first single, My Aim Is True was delayed to July while Stiff resolved a distribution dispute with Island Records. In the meantime, Costello wanted to form a permanent backing band that better fitted his aspiring image compared to the laid-back approach of Clover. The first person hired was drummer Pete Thomas, followed by bassist Bruce Thomas (no relation). Around this time, Costello's new tracks "Watching the Detectives" and "No Action", were quickly recorded at Pathway with bassist Andrew Bodnar and drummer Steve Goulding, with organ and piano overdubs by Steve Nieve. "Watching the Detectives", influenced by the Clash's debut album, was a departure from the sound of My Aim Is True, displaying reggae-style rhythms. Costello later called it his "first real record". The song was issued as a single in the UK on 14 October 1977, backed by live versions of "Blame It on Cain" and "Miracle Man".

=== Live performances ===
Stiff issued My Aim Is True in the UK on 22 July 1977, with the catalogue number SEEZ 3. By the time it came out Costello was performing with his new backing band, donned the Attractions. Shortly after its release, Costello and the Attractions performed an unauthorised show outside a Columbia Records convention that gathered executives from around the world. Partly due to the antics of Riviera, Costello was arrested and charged with obstruction, fined £5 and released from the police station in time for a gig later that evening. The stunt attracted the attention of executive Greg Geller, who was integral in Costello's signing to Columbia in the United States months later.

To support My Aim Is True, Costello and the Attractions conducted a short tour throughout August 1977. The gigs took place in major cities throughout Britain, alongside a residency at the Nashville Rooms in London. The setlist consisted mostly of My Aim Is True tracks plus various new songs. In the middle of the tour, Elvis Presley died of a heart attack on 16 August. Presley's death had an immediate impact on Costello: British newspapers Daily Mail and Daily Observer cancelled their planned features on the artist while Stiff ran a new slogan for the label that read "The King Is Dead, Long Live the King". According to Thomson, Presley's death helped earn Costello more stature in the music press, with his name becoming "the mood of the zeitgeist". Four days after his death, My Aim Is True reached number 14 on the UK Albums Chart.

On 3 October 1977, Costello and the Attractions embarked on another tour with other Stiff artists, including Lowe and Wreckless Eric, dubbed the Greatest Stiffs Live Tour. It was plagued with disorder and self-inflicted sabotage, partly due to Costello's refusal to play songs from My Aim Is True, declaring "If you wanna hear the old songs, buy the fucking record;" he reversed this stance after audience backlash. Costello also fought with fellow artist Ian Dury throughout the tour. Riviera departed Stiff around this time due to disputes with Robinson. Per his management contract, Costello–and Lowe–followed Riviera and departed Stiff for Radar Records; his final release for Stiff was "Watching the Detectives", which became both the artist and label's first single to reach the UK top 20. In the meantime, Costello had amassed a large amount of new material that would appear on his second album This Year's Model. In mid-November, he began his first tour of America.

=== US release ===
The billboard advertising My Aim Is True on Los Angeles's Sunset Boulevard, a location usually reserved for more well-known acts.

My Aim Is True was released in revised form in the United States through Columbia Records on 1 November 1977, adding "Watching the Detectives" as the final track on side one. By then, it was the biggest-selling import album in US history. Marketing for the American release was spearheaded by Columbia's product manager Dick Wingate, who commissioned a billboard for the LP on Los Angeles's Sunset Boulevard, which was usually reserved for more major acts. Other merchandise created included a dartboard for Columbia's staff. On 13 October, Wingate sent a memo to key Columbia staff, which read: "Despite his appearance, Costello is a deadly serious artist, singer and songwriter ... in the R&B revivalist/rock-and-roll school of Graham Parker, Southside Johnny, or even Springsteen. His music is not punk-rock, and should never be labeled so." Later the same month, Columbia's VP of National Album Promotion Mike Pillot sent a memo to staff calling it "One of the most unique and exciting new albums that has graced any turntable during the last few years".

According to Thomson, Costello's fame in the US skyrocketed faster than in the UK. He was earning acclaim in publications such as Time and Newsweek and was also approached to appear on NBC's Saturday Night Live. His newfound popularity led My Aim Is True to selling 100,000 copies towards the middle of the tour, and shortly before Christmas 1977, it reached number 32 on Billboard's Top LPs & Tape chart. After leaving Stiff, Costello retained his deal with Columbia for distribution in America. Costello was nominated for the Grammy Award for Best New Artist at the 20th Annual Grammy Awards in 1978, but lost to the group A Taste of Honey.

== Critical reception ==
Professional ratings
Initial reviews
Review scores
Source	Rating
Robert Christgau	B+
The Philadelphia Inquirer	3/4 stars
Record Mirror	4/5 stars
Sounds	5/5 stars

My Aim Is True received rave reviews from British and American music journalists on release. Writing for Trouser Press, Dave Schulps hailed My Aim Is True as 1977's "most auspicious debut album", praising Costello's musicianship and songwriting, concluding he has "produced a classic in his first try". Chas de Whalley of Sounds called Costello "a songwriter of rare sensitivity and talent" but had trouble getting a grip with the songs, nevertheless concluding: "Like a flower, Elvis' debut album is opening up into something of metallic beauty." In Melody Maker, Allan Jones wrote that "hell, you can dance to it, swoon and romance with it, smooch and romance to it". He further noted the record contained "enough potential hit singles to stock a bloody juke-box", concluding "I can think of only a few albums released this year that rival its general excellence." Roy Carr of the NME came across "sexual psychoanalysis set to a dozen superb juke joint anthems ... a Seventies interpretation of Sixties rhythm and roll," while the songs "spill over with emotional torture and melodrama". He commented that "Costello must have taken a lot of emotional knocks to come up with such a powerful album. To the extent that one is reticent to guess to what lengths he may have to go to enact a second instalment."

Several reviewers praised Costello as an artist. Greil Marcus of Rolling Stone wrote: "How far Costello can go ... remains to be seen, but I have a feeling that once he is heard, he is going to shake up a lot of his erstwhile peers and make many musicians whom he would not consider his peers seem quite irrelevant." In Stage Life, Jeffrey Morgan wrote that at only 22 years old, Costello "gashed a line in his soul using rock 'n' roll as the blade", creating an LP that, as "flawed as it is, cannot be ignored". Sam Sutherland of High Fidelity hailed Costello as a "new wave rock classicist", creating an album that "rediscovers the raw vitality of rock" in the midst of '70s pop. He also called Lowe's production "exciting" and "deliberately crude". Meanwhile, Robin Denselow of The Guardian considered the lyrics the best from a British artist in years. The Philadelphia Inquirer gave My Aim Is True three out of four stars, also praising the lyrical content and felt Costello would achieve a commercial breakthrough.

Writing for Creem, Mitchell Cohen hailed My Aim Is True as one of the year's best albums and praised the songs for their "memorable" choruses and strong ideas. He criticised the misogynistic lyrics, which he compared to the mid-1960s material of Mick Jagger, concluding that Costello has "some way to go before his emotional maturity matches his prodigious artistic skill". In The Village Voice, Robert Christgau wrote: "I like the nerdy way this guy comes on, I'm fascinated by his lyrics, and I approve of his rock and roll orientation." He negatively compared Costello to Jackson Browne in that "he's a little boring", which he states comes from an "overconcentration on lyrics" and can be solved by "a healthy relationship with a band". Danny Baker in ZigZag magazine, who also made comparisons to Browne in his review, simply called My Aim Is True a "good, good album". In The Village Voice's annual Pazz & Jop critics' poll of the year's best albums, My Aim Is True finished at number two, behind the Sex Pistols' Never Mind the Bollocks. It further placed in other year-end lists by Rolling Stone, NME (3) and Sounds (9).

=== Retrospective reviews ===
Professional ratings
Retrospective reviews
Review scores
Source	Rating
AllMusic	5/5 stars
Blender	4/5 stars
Chicago Tribune	3.5/4 stars
The Encyclopedia of Popular Music	4/5 stars
Entertainment Weekly	A−
Pitchfork	9.8/10
Q	4/5 stars
Rolling Stone	5/5 stars
The Rolling Stone Album Guide	5/5 stars
Spin	4/5 stars
Uncut	5/5 stars

In later decades, My Aim Is True has received critical acclaim, with some naming it one of the best debut albums in rock history. Terry Staunton of Record Collector magazine summarised: "As opening salvos go, My Aim Is True has to be one of the most important, impressive and enduring debuts of all time." Senior AllMusic editor Stephen Thomas Erlewine wrote: "Costello went on to more ambitious territory fairly quickly, but My Aim Is True is a phenomenal debut, capturing a songwriter and musician whose words were as rich and clever as his music." In Paste magazine, Mark Baker similarly wrote that although the record was not Costello's greatest work, it still remains "a landmark, highly influential first album". Goodman concurred, calling the album Costello's most essential album. Writing in 2010, Nick Freed of Consequence of Sound called My Aim Is True one of the strongest debut albums, stating, "You couldn't find a stronger way to bring your style to the world", further recognising Costello's influence on bands such as They Might Be Giants and the Hold Steady. Entertainment Weekly's Armond White wrote that out of the British pub rock scene, My Aim Is True stands out as a debut "with lots to say". PopMatters' reviewers Jason Mendelsohn and Eric Klinger, while positive overall, commented on the lack of the Attractions and subdued production over Costello's subsequent albums. Nevertheless, the two called it a "solid" debut whose faults would be resolved the next year on This Year's Model.

Many have commented on the record's influence on music. Reviewing in 2001, Adam Bresnick of Rolling Stone wrote: "Balancing the rage of punk with the formalism of the century's best songcraft, the album delivers passion and intelligence in equal measure." In 2007, LeMay highlighted "Alison", "Red Shoes", "Less Than Zero" and "Watching the Detectives" as tracks that represent a "vital chapter" in the development of punk and new wave. Furthermore, he found the album as a whole remains as relevant as it did when it was first reissued. Ten years later, a reviewer for Classic Rock Review stated that My Aim Is True "introduced the world to a hybrid sound that drew near equal influence from 1950s old time rock n' roll and 1970s cutting edge new wave and punk." LeMay summarised the album as: "Wordy, witty, and geeky as fuck, My Aim Is True is without question one of the finest statements of brilliant nerddom ever to be released." Gouldstone appraises My Aim Is True as "a magnificently measured cry of rage" and remains a "remarkable achievement" for someone only 22 years old at the time. Thomson later told Record Collector:

I think My Aim Is True sounds like a blueprint for what [Costello] does best. It's not a fully-fledged document of his genius, but albums like King of America [1986] or even The Delivery Man [2004] ... both have elements of the first record in them. When I was writing my Elvis book it struck me just how much of the album is looking back to where he's come from and signposting where he was going to.

=== Rankings ===
My Aim Is True has frequently appeared on lists of the greatest albums of all time. In 2000, My Aim Is True was voted number 266 in the third edition of writer Colin Larkin's book All Time Top 1000 Albums (2000). In 1987, Rolling Stone placed it at number 29 on its list of the best albums of the past 20 years. The same magazine ranked the album number 168 in its list of the 500 greatest albums of all time in 2003, maintaining the rating in a 2012 revised list, and dropping to number 430 on the 2020 list. The same magazine ranked it the 21st best debut album in 2013. Uncut magazine also placed it at number 125 in their 2016 list of the 200 greatest albums of all time. In 2004, Pitchfork ranked My Aim Is True the 37th best album of the 1970s, while in 2012, Paste placed it at number 20 in a similar list. The staff of Paste later voted it the best new wave album of all time in 2020, arguing that it set both the "musical and fashion stage" for the genre. In 2004, Charles Shaar Murray voted it the 61st best British album in a list for The Observer.

In 2007, My Aim Is True was inducted into the Grammy Hall of Fame. The album was also included in the 2005 edition of Robert Dimery's book 1001 Albums You Must Hear Before You Die.

== Legacy ==
In lists ranking Costello's albums, My Aim Is True has consistently ranked as one of Costello's best. In 2021, writers for Stereogum placed it at number six, calling it "one of rock music's great opening salvos". A year later, writing for Spin magazine, Al Shipley placed it at number two, behind This Year's Model, stating that had he not made another record after My Aim Is True, he would "still be a legend". The same year, Michael Gallucci of Ultimate Classic Rock also placed it at number two, behind This Year's Model. He noted Clover's lack of force compared to the Attractions, but nevertheless wrote that fewer have arrived with debuts as "instantly significant" as My Aim Is True.

On 8 November 2007, Costello reunited with the members of Clover from the original recording sessions to perform the songs from My Aim Is True. This marked the first (and to date only) live public performances of these songs by the original ensemble that recorded them. The event took place at the Great American Music Hall in San Francisco, and was a benefit for the Richard de Lone Special Housing Fund, which assists those with Prader–Willi syndrome.

== Reissues ==
My Aim Is True was first released on CD through Columbia and Demon Records in July 1986. Its first extended reissue came in October 1993 through Demon in the UK and Rykodisc in the US, which featured nine bonus tracks and extensive liner notes written by Costello himself. In 2001, it was again reissued on CD by Rhino Entertainment, featuring the original album on disc one and a bonus disc of demos, live versions and outtakes, along with a new set of more elaborate Costello-written liner notes; all nine bonus tracks from the 1993 reissue were included with an added four. LeMay considers this reissue the most essential for the album itself.

=== 2007 Deluxe Edition ===
Professional ratings
2007 Deluxe Edition
Review scores
Source	Rating
Glide Magazine	4/5
Pitchfork	7.0/10

Six years later, My Aim Is True was reissued again by Universal/Hip-O on 11 September 2007 in a single-disc "Original Masters" package and a two-disc deluxe edition comprising 48 tracks, 26 previously unreleased. This package features the original album, outtakes and solo demos on disc one and a complete live show (with soundcheck) recorded on 7 August 1977 at the Nashville Rooms in London on disc two. The tracks from the live show were mostly from My Aim Is True, with some that appeared on This Year's Model, while the demos are previously unreleased tracks including "Blue Minute", "Call on Me", "I Don't Want to Go Home" and "I Hear a Melody". Hip-O hailed the deluxe edition as "the most definitive version of My Aim Is True yet!" Despite this, the deluxe edition received mixed reviews. LeMay felt it was inferior to the previous reissues, stating that it "lacks the reverent and enthusiastically geeky perspective of the Rhino reissue". He further noted the absence of several tracks and in-depth liner notes present on the other reissues. Erlewine similarly questioned the release of the deluxe edition, as he felt it was superfluous following the Rhino reissue. He nevertheless stated that hardcore fans would appreciate the new material, albeit having to purchase an album they had likely already purchased.

=== 49th Anniversary Edition ===
Professional ratings
49th Anniversary Edition
Review scores
Source	Rating
Mojo	5/5 stars
Uncut	4.5/5 stars

To celebrate the album's 49th anniversary, My Aim Is True was released as an expanded box set on 2 October 2026 through UM^{e}. Discussing why he chose to release it for the 49th anniversary, Costello stated in the liner notes: "When first proposed, I thought the whole idea of celebrating a 50th Anniversary of My Aim Is True was preposterous. It made my teeth itch. It couldn't just be set up like a venerable object in a glass case." Subtitled 49th Anniversary Edition, the set spans five discs, 104 tracks in total, 52 of which are previously unreleased. The first disc features a new remaster of the original album, combining the UK and US track listings; the second features recordings from 1975 and 1976 that predate the My Aim Is True recording sessions; the third contains demos and outtakes from the album; the fourth features live performances from Costello's earliest shows with the Attractions; and the fifth disc presents Costello's 2007 reunion show with the members of Clover.

== Track listing ==
=== Original release ===
All tracks are written by Elvis Costello.

Side one
No.	Title	Length
1.	"Welcome to the Working Week"	1:20
2.	"Miracle Man"	2:40
3.	"No Dancing"	2:30
4.	"Blame It on Cain"	2:00
5.	"Alison"	2:00
6.	"Sneaky Feelings"	2:30

Side two
No.	Title	Length
7.	"(The Angels Wanna Wear My) Red Shoes"	2:30
8.	"Less Than Zero"	1:30
9.	"Mystery Dance"	2:00
10.	"Pay It Back"	2:00
11.	"I'm Not Angry"	3:30
12.	"Waiting for the End of the World"	3:40
Total length:		28:10

==== Note ====
- "Watching the Detectives", released in the UK as a single in October 1977, was added to the US release as the last track on side one. It has subsequently appeared as the final track on the album on reissues.

=== 1993 Rykodisc rerelease ===
All tracks are written by Elvis Costello.

No.	Title	Length
1.	"Welcome to the Working Week"	1:22
2.	"Miracle Man"	3:28
3.	"No Dancing"	2:37
4.	"Blame It on Cain"	2:48
5.	"Alison"	3:21
6.	"Sneaky Feelings"	2:08
7.	"(The Angels Wanna Wear My) Red Shoes"	2:32
8.	"Less than Zero"	3:11
9.	"Mystery Dance"	1:35
10.	"Pay It Back"	2:32
11.	"I'm Not Angry"	2:57
12.	"Waiting for the End of the World"	3:22
13.	"Watching the Detectives"	3:45

Extended Play
No.	Title	Length
14.	"Radio Sweetheart"	2:25
15.	"Stranger in the House"	3:01
16.	"Imagination (Is A Powerful Deceiver)"	3:38
17.	"Mystery Dance"	2:13
18.	"Cheap Reward"	2:15
19.	"Jump Up"	2:06
20.	"Wave a White Flag"	1:53
21.	"Blame it on Cain"	3:30
22.	"Poison Moon"	1:53

=== 5 CD 49th Anniversary Edition ===
All tracks are written by Elvis Costello, unless otherwise noted.

CD 1: 2026 remaster
No.	Title	Length
1.	"Welcome to the Working Week"	1:22
2.	"Miracle Man"	3:28
3.	"No Dancing"	2:37
4.	"Blame It on Cain"	2:48
5.	"Alison"	3:21
6.	"Sneaky Feelings"	2:08
7.	"(The Angels Wanna Wear My) Red Shoes"	2:32
8.	"Less than Zero"	3:11
9.	"Mystery Dance"	1:35
10.	"Pay It Back"	2:32
11.	"I'm Not Angry"	2:57
12.	"Waiting for the End of the World"	3:22
13.	"Watching the Detectives" (Single version)	3:45

CD 2: The Blue Print
No.	Title	Length
1.	"I Turn Around" (Hope & Anchor Studio)
2.	"Losing You" (Hope & Anchor Studio)
3.	"Leverman" (Hope & Anchor Studio)
4.	"Citizen Junction" (Hope & Anchor Studio)
5.	"I Hear a Melody" (Pathway Studios)
6.	"Poison Moon" (Bedroom Recording)
7.	"Wave A White Flag" (Bedroom Recording)
8.	"Mercury Wings" (Ms. Dore's Tape)
9.	"Jump Up" (Hope & Anchor Studio)
10.	"No Star" (Hope & Anchor Studio)
11.	"Walk On" (Hope & Anchor Studio)
12.	"Radio Soul" (Early version of Radio Radio) (Hope & Anchor Studio)
13.	"Clean Money" (Hope & Anchor Studio)
14.	"Don't Put a Levy on My Love" (Hope & Anchor Studio)
15.	"Play It Safe" (Hope & Anchor Studio)
16.	"Imagination (Is A Powerful Deceiver)" (Hope & Anchor Studio)
17.	"I Can't Turn It Off" (Hope & Anchor Studio)

CD 3: The Stranger in the House
No.	Title	Writer(s)	Length
1.	"Radio Sweetheart" (My Aim Is True Outtake)
2.	"Cheap Reward" (Bedroom Recording)
3.	"Mystery Dance" (Bedroom Recording)
4.	"Stranger in the House" (My Aim Is True Outtake)
5.	"Running Out of Angels" (Hope & Anchor Studio)
6.	"Just Like a Jukebox" (Hope & Anchor Studio)
7.	"I Don't Want to Go Home" (Pathway Studios)
8.	"Blame It on Cain" (Bedroom Recording)
9.	"Blue Minute" (Ms. Dore's Tape)
10.	"Pay It Back" (Bedroom Recording)
11.	"Exiles Road" (Flip City – Hope & Anchor Studio)
12.	"Knockin' on Heaven's Door" (Flip City – Hope & Anchor Studio)	Bob Dylan
13.	"Sweet Revival" (Flip City – Hope & Anchor Studio)
14.	"Pay It Back" (Flip City – Hope & Anchor Studio)
15.	"Imagination (Is A Powerful Deceiver)" (Flip City – Hope & Anchor Studio)
16.	"Living in Paradise" (Hope & Anchor Studio)
17.	"Welcome to the Working Week" (Pathway Studios)
18.	"Miracle Man" (Bedroom Recording)
19.	"Miracle Man" (Pathway Studios)
20.	"(The Angels Wanna Wear My) Red Shoes" (Ms. Dore's Tape)
21.	"(The Angels Wanna Wear My) Red Shoes" (Pathway Studios)
22.	"Waiting for the End of The World" (Pathway Studios)
23.	"Living in Paradise" (My Aim Is True Outtake)
24.	"Call on Me" (Pathway Studios)
25.	"Watching the Detectives" (Pathway Studios Trio Version)
26.	"No Action" (Pathway Studios Trio Version)
27.	"Poison Moon" (Ms. Dore's Tape)
28.	"Stranger in the House" (Ms. Dore's Tape)

CD 4: Becoming the Attractions
No.	Title	Length
1.	"Alison" (What's on Granada Reports)
2.	"Introduction by Dave Robinson" (Live, The Nashville Room)
3.	"Mystery Dance" (Live, The Nashville Room)
4.	"Pay It Back" (Soundcheck, The Nashville Room)
5.	"Radio Sweetheart" (Soundcheck, The Nashville Room)
6.	"Sneaky Feelings" (Soundcheck, The Nashville Room)
7.	"Crawling to the U.S.A." (Soundcheck, The Nashville Room)
8.	"Lip Service" (Pathway Studios)
9.	"(The Angels Wanna Wear My) Red Shoe" (with Introduction Top of the Pops)
10.	"Interview No. 1" (Good Afternoon with Mavis Nicholson)
11.	"Watching the Detectives" (Good Afternoon Broadcast)
12.	"Interview No. 2" (Good Afternoon with Mavis Nicholson)
13.	"Hoover Factory" (Good Afternoon Rehearsal)
14.	"I Just Don't Know What to Do with Myself" (Live Stiffs, University of East Anglia, Norwich, U.K.)
15.	"Whole Wide World" (Live Stiffs, University of Leicester, Leicester, U.K.)
16.	"KSAN Intro" (Old Waldorf, San Francisco, CA)
17.	"Pump It Up" (Old Waldorf, San Francisco, CA)
18.	"Lip Service" (Unknown Field Recording)
19.	"Mystery Dance" (Winterland Ballroom, San Francisco, CA)
20.	"Blame It on Cain" (Winterland Ballroom, San Francisco, CA)
21.	"Less Than Zero" (Dallas Version) – (Warner Theater, Washington D.C.)
22.	"Waiting for the End of The World" (Agora Ballroom, Cleveland, OH)
23.	"Miracle Man" (Warner Theater, Washington D.C.)
24.	"Watching the Detectives" (Winterland Ballroom, San Francisco, CA)
25.	"I'm Not Angry" (Winterland Ballroom, San Francisco, CA)

CD 5: Covered in Clover (Live at the Great American Music Hall, San Francisco, CA – 8 November 2007)
No.	Title	Length
1.	"Welcome to the Working Week"
2.	"Miracle Man"
3.	"No Dancing"
4.	"Intro to Blame It on Cain"
5.	"Blame It on Cain"
6.	"Alison"
7.	"Intro to Sneaky Feelings"
8.	"Sneaky Feelings"
9.	"Intro to Red Shoes"
10.	"(The Angels Wanna Wear My) Red Shoes"
11.	"Less Than Zero"
12.	"Mystery Dance"
13.	"Pay It Back"
14.	"I'm Not Angry"
15.	"Waiting for the End of the World/Gloria"
16.	"Watching the Detectives"
17.	"Moon"
18.	"Intro to the Love Trilogy"
19.	"Love Has No Pride"
20.	"Love Is Gone"
21.	"(What's So Funny 'Bout) Peace, Love and Understanding"

== Personnel ==
According to the liner notes of the 1993 reissue:

- Elvis Costello – vocals, guitar, piano and drumsticks on "Mystery Dance"
- John McFee – lead guitar, pedal steel guitar, backing vocals
- Sean Hopper – piano, organ, backing vocals
- Johnny Ciambotti – bass, backing vocals
- Mickey Shine – drums
- Stan Shaw – organ on "Less Than Zero"
- Nick Lowe – backing vocals, piano, drumsticks and bass on "Mystery Dance"
- Andrew Bodnar – bass on "Watching the Detectives"
- Steve Goulding – drums on "Watching the Detectives"
- Steve Nieve – organ and piano overdubs on "Watching the Detectives"

Technical

- Nick Lowe – producer
- Barry "Bazza" Farmer – engineer
- Wendy Sherman – art direction, design

== Charts and certifications ==
=== Weekly charts ===
Weekly chart performance for My Aim Is True
Chart (1977–78)	Peak Position
Australian Albums (Kent Music Report)	25
Canadian Albums (RPM)	24
New Zealand Albums (RIANZ)	32
Swedish Albums (Sverigetopplistan)	14
UK Albums Chart	14
US Billboard Top LPs & Tape	32

2026 weekly chart performance for My Aim Is True
Chart (2026)	Peak position
Belgian Albums (Ultratop Flanders)	189

=== Year-end charts ===
Year-end chart performance for My Aim Is True
Chart (1978)	Position
US Billboard Top LPs & Tape	64

=== Certifications ===
Certifications for My Aim Is True
Region	Certification	Certified units/sales
Canada (Music Canada)	Gold	50,000^{^}
United Kingdom (BPI)	Silver	60,000^{^}
United States (RIAA)	Platinum	1,000,000^{^}
^{^} Shipments figures based on certification alone.
