= Less than Zero (Elvis Costello song) =

1977 single by Elvis Costello

- Cover art for UK and Dutch releases

Single by Elvis Costello

from the album My Aim Is True
- B-side: "Radio Sweetheart"
- Released: 11 March 1977
- Recorded: 1977
- Genre: New wave
- Length: 3:13
- Label: Stiff
- Songwriter(s): Elvis Costello
- Producer(s): Nick Lowe

Elvis Costello singles chronology
| "Less than Zero" (1977) | "Alison" (1977) |

"Less than Zero" is the debut single by Elvis Costello, released in 1977 on Stiff Records. It is the eighth track on Costello's debut album, My Aim Is True. Written about British fascist Oswald Mosley, the song features what AllMusic described as a "slow, slinky [and] sinister" melody.

== Background ==
The song expressed Costello's anger after seeing former British Union of Fascists leader Oswald Mosley interviewed on television, attempting to deny his racist past. In the liner notes to the Rhino edition of the album, Costello writes:

"Less Than Zero" was a song I had written after seeing the despicable Oswald Mosley being interviewed on BBC television. The former leader of the British Union of Fascists seemed unrepentant about his poisonous actions of the 1930s. The song was more of a slandering fantasy than a reasoned argument.

On his first visit to the United States, Costello found that American audiences did not understand the song, writing in his 2015 autobiography, Unfaithful Music and Disappearing Ink: "I'm not sure if anyone in Cleveland had ever heard of Oswald Mosley or gave a damn about him when we played 'Less Than Zero' that night. It was just some rock and roll music with a fashionable-sounding title". Later, he substantially rewrote the lyrics to refer to Lee Harvey Oswald. This was a reference to the common misconception among American fans that this was the "Mr. Oswald" referred to in the original lyrics. This version is usually referred to as the "Dallas version" and is available as a bonus track on the My Aim is True reissue, and a live version can be found on Live at the El Mocambo.

== Lyrics and music ==
"Less than Zero" fits in with a number of others on early Costello albums that deal with themes of fascism and totalitarianism, which also include "Night Rally" from This Year's Model and "Goon Squad" from Armed Forces. In this case, a racist and totalitarian movement is seen in terms of sub rosa teenage sex: "Turn up the TV...even your mother won't detect it/So your father won't know."

Allmusic critic Mark Deming describes the melody as "slow, slinky [and] sinister". Deming also suggests that the melody shows some reggae influences, even though the rhythm does not incorporate reggae syncopations. Deming describes the song as "controversial, audacious, and highly effective" as well as "a truly remarkable debut."

== Release ==
In addition to its release on My Aim Is True. "Less than Zero" was released as Costello's first single. The single featured the non-album B-side, "Radio Sweetheart", which later appeared on the second Stiff Records various artists sampler, Hits Greatest Stiffs. A song with both country and psychedelic elements, it's been noted as a song more experimental than the tracks on his early albums. The single did not chart. "Less than Zero" also appears on the first Stiff Records compilation A Bunch of Stiff Records.

== Saturday Night Live incident ==
The song was also involved in Costello's infamous performance on Saturday Night Live on 17 December 1977. Following pressure from his record company to play the song on the show, Costello began to play the song, but he stopped after only a few bars, saying that "there's no reason to do this song here". He then launched into an unannounced performance of "Radio Radio", a song he had promised not to play. As a result, he was banned from the series until 1989. In 2015, Costello wrote of having seen his appearance on Saturday Night Live as an opportunity equivalent to the Beatles' first live US television performance on The Ed Sullivan Show: "[...] Columbia insisted that the second song should be 'Less than Zero'. The song had already proven to be obscure to many American ears, and if this was supposed to be our I Want to Hold Your Hand moment, I thought the song was too low-key." He had then come up with the plan to switch songs, inspired by a live performance on the BBC's The Lulu Show in 1969 in which Jimi Hendrix had scrapped a performance of "Hey Joe" after a few bars, to instead play an impromptu tribute to Cream, who had broken up just days before.
